= Kjosfossen Station =

Railway station in Aurland, Norway

Kjosfossen Station Kjosfossen stasjon
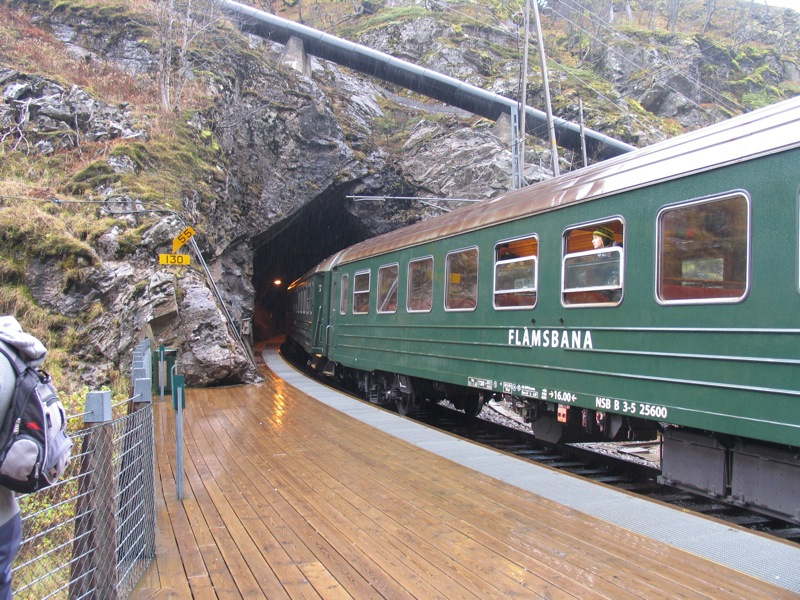
- View of the station

General information
- Location: Kjosfossen, Aurland Municipality; Norway
- Coordinates: 60.74695°N 7.13565°E
- Elevation: 670 m (2,200 ft)
- System: Railway station
- Owner: Bane NOR
- Operator: Flåm Utvikling (Vy)
- Line: Flåmsbanen
- Distance: 339.76 km (211.12 mi)
- Platforms: 1

History
- Opened: 1951
Location

Kjosfossen Station (Norwegian: Kjosfossen holdeplass) is a railway station on the Flåm Line at Kjosfossen in Aurland Municipality, Norway. It is located 4.40 kilometers (2.73 mi) from Myrdal Station, 339.76 kilometers (211.12 mi) from Oslo Central Station, and 670 meters (2,200 ft) above mean sea level. The station opened in 1951 as Kjosfossen kraftstasjon, but took the current name from February 1977. There are no residents in the area and the station only exists to allow tourists to step off the train and see the large waterfall Kjosfossen which can be viewed from the station's platform. It is also the site of Kjosfoss Power Station.

Preceding station		Following station
Kårdal	Flåm Line	Reinunga
