= Reinunga Station =

Railway station in Aurland, Norway

Reinunga Station Reinunga stasjon
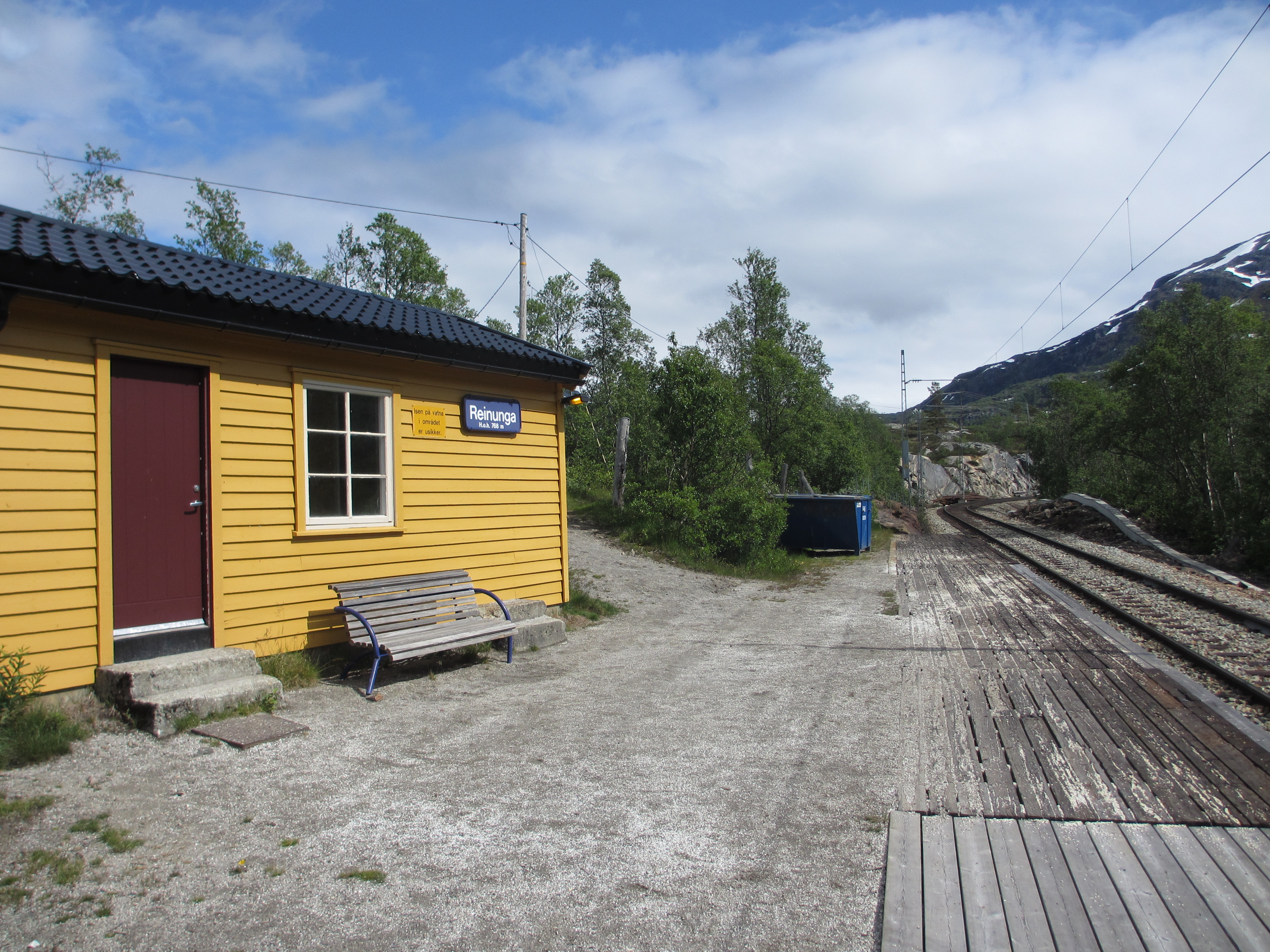
- View of the station

General information
- Location: Reinunga, Aurland Municipality; Norway
- Coordinates: 60.74388°N 7.1392°E
- System: Railway station
- Owner: Bane NOR
- Operator: Flåm Utvikling (Vy)
- Line: Flåmsbanen
- Distance: 338.00 km (210.02 mi)
- Platforms: 1

History
- Opened: 1942
Location

Reinunga Station (Norwegian: Reinunga holdeplass) is a railway station in Aurland Municipality, Norway. It is located along the Flåm Line which links the villages of Flåm and Myrdal and to the Oslo-Bergen train line. It is 2.20 kilometers (1.37 mi) from Myrdal Station, 338.00 kilometers (210.02 mi) from Oslo Central Station, and 767 meters (2,516 ft) above mean sea level. The station opened in 1942.

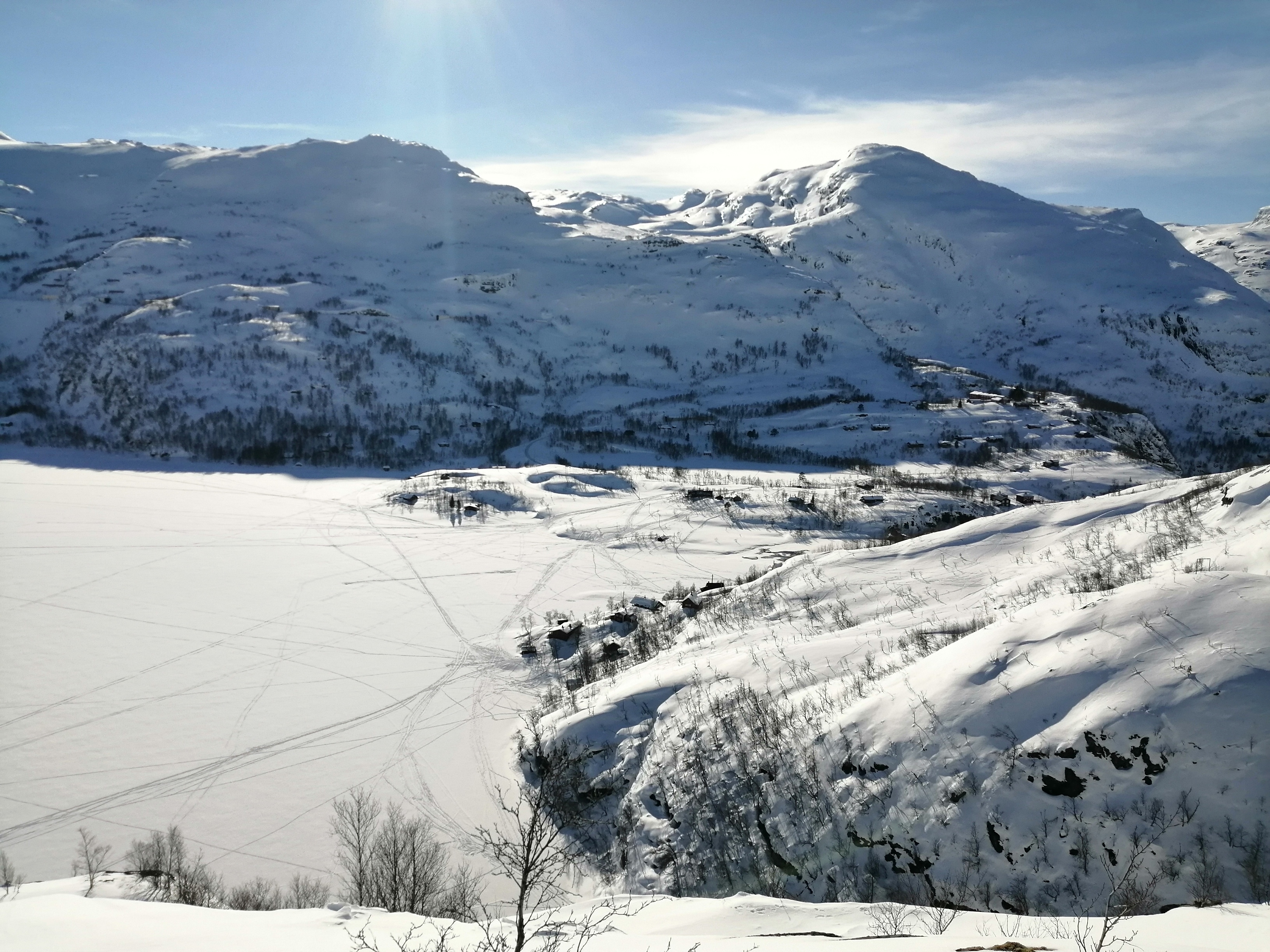
View of Reinunga from Tarven mountain side

Reinunga Station is a popular starting point for hiking in the summer and ski touring in the winter. The station is near the Kjosfossen waterfall, Reinungavatnet lake, and the Rallarvegen path. It is also surrounded by mountains with Tarven on one side and Geitonosi on the other.

== History ==
The station was historically known as Kjosfoss. In 1977 the name was changed to Reinunga station. It used to have accommodation for the railway workers.

Preceding station		Following station
Kjosfossen	Flåm Line	Vatnahalsen
