= Blomheller Station =

Railway station in Aurland, Norway

Blomheller Station Blomheller stasjon
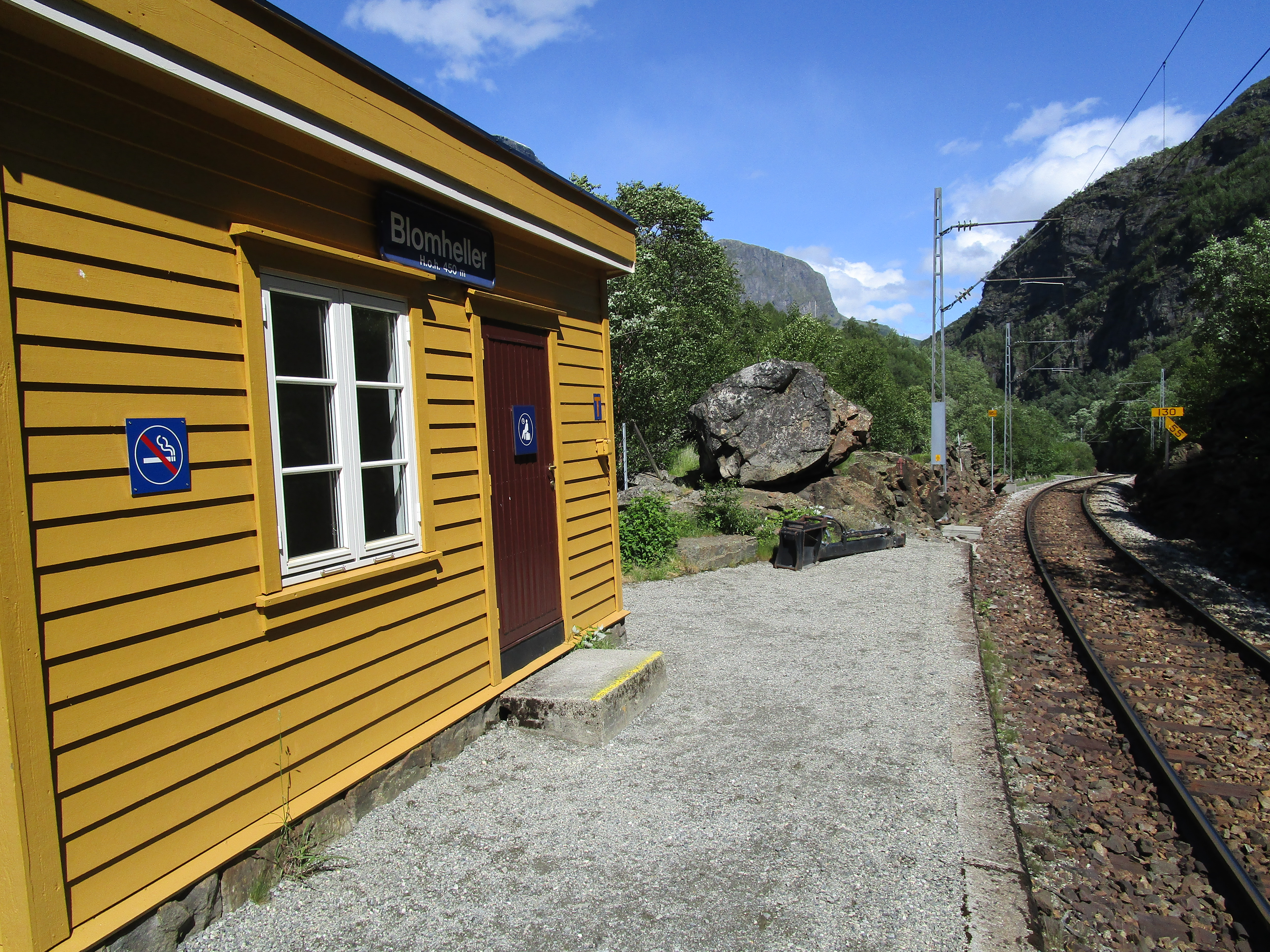
- View of the station

General information
- Location: Blomheller, Aurland Municipality; Norway
- Coordinates: 60.77172°N 7.10178°E
- Elevation: 458 m (1,503 ft)
- System: Railway station
- Owner: Bane NOR
- Operator: Flåm Utvikling (Vy)
- Line: Flåmsbanen
- Distance: 344.20 km (213.88 mi)
- Platforms: 1

History
- Opened: 1942
Location

Blomheller Station (Norwegian: Blomheller holdeplass) is a railway station on the Flåm Line at Melhus in Aurland Municipality, Norway. It is located 8.40 kilometers (5.22 mi) from Myrdal Station, 344.20 kilometers (213.88 mi) from Oslo Central Station, and 458 meters (1,503 ft) above mean sea level. The station opened in 1942.

Preceding station		Following station
Berekvam	Flåm Line	Kårdal
