= Dalsbotn Station =

Former railway station in Aurland, Norway

Dalsbotn Station Dalsbotn stasjon

General information
- Location: Dalsbotn, Aurland Municipality; Norway
- Coordinates: 60.81231°N 7.12401°E
- Elevation: 199 m (653 ft)
- System: Railway station
- Owner: Bane NOR
- Operator: Flåm Utvikling (Vy)
- Line: Flåmsbanen
- Distance: 349.70 km (217.29 mi)
- Platforms: 1

History
- Opened: 1942
- Closed: 2015
Location

Dalsbotn Station (Norwegian: Dalsbotn holdeplass) is a railway station on the Flåm Line at Dalsbotn in Aurland Municipality, Norway. It is located 13.90 kilometers (8.64 mi) from Myrdal Station, 349.70 kilometers (217.29 mi) from Oslo Central Station, and 199 meters (653 ft) above mean sea level. The station opened in 1942. Since 2015, the station has not been used.

Preceding station		Following station
Håreina	Flåm Line	Berekvam
