= Kårdal Station =

Former railway station in Aurland, Norway

Kårdal Station Kårdal stasjon

General information
- Location: Kårdal, Aurland Municipality; Norway
- Coordinates: 60.75614°N 7.10555°E
- Elevation: 557 m (1,827 ft)
- System: Railway station
- Owner: Bane NOR
- Operator: Flåm Utvikling (Vy)
- Line: Flåmsbanen
- Distance: 341.95 km (212.48 mi)
- Platforms: 1

History
- Opened: 16 June 1946
- Closed: 2015
Location

Kårdal Station (Norwegian: Kårdal holdeplass) is a railway station on the Flåm Line at Kårdal in Aurland Municipality, Norway. It is located 6.34 kilometers (3.94 mi) from Myrdal Station, 341.95 kilometers (212.48 mi) from Oslo Central Station and 557 meters (1,827 ft) above mean sea level. The station opened on 16 June 1946. It is the station that traditionally served the farm furthest up in the valley of Flåmsdalen. Because the station is located on a gradient, only trains heading downhill can stop at the station. The station has been unused since around 2015.

Preceding station		Following station
Blomheller	Flåm Line	Kjosfossen
