= Berekvam station =

Railway station in Aurland, Norway

Berekvam Station Berekvam stasjon
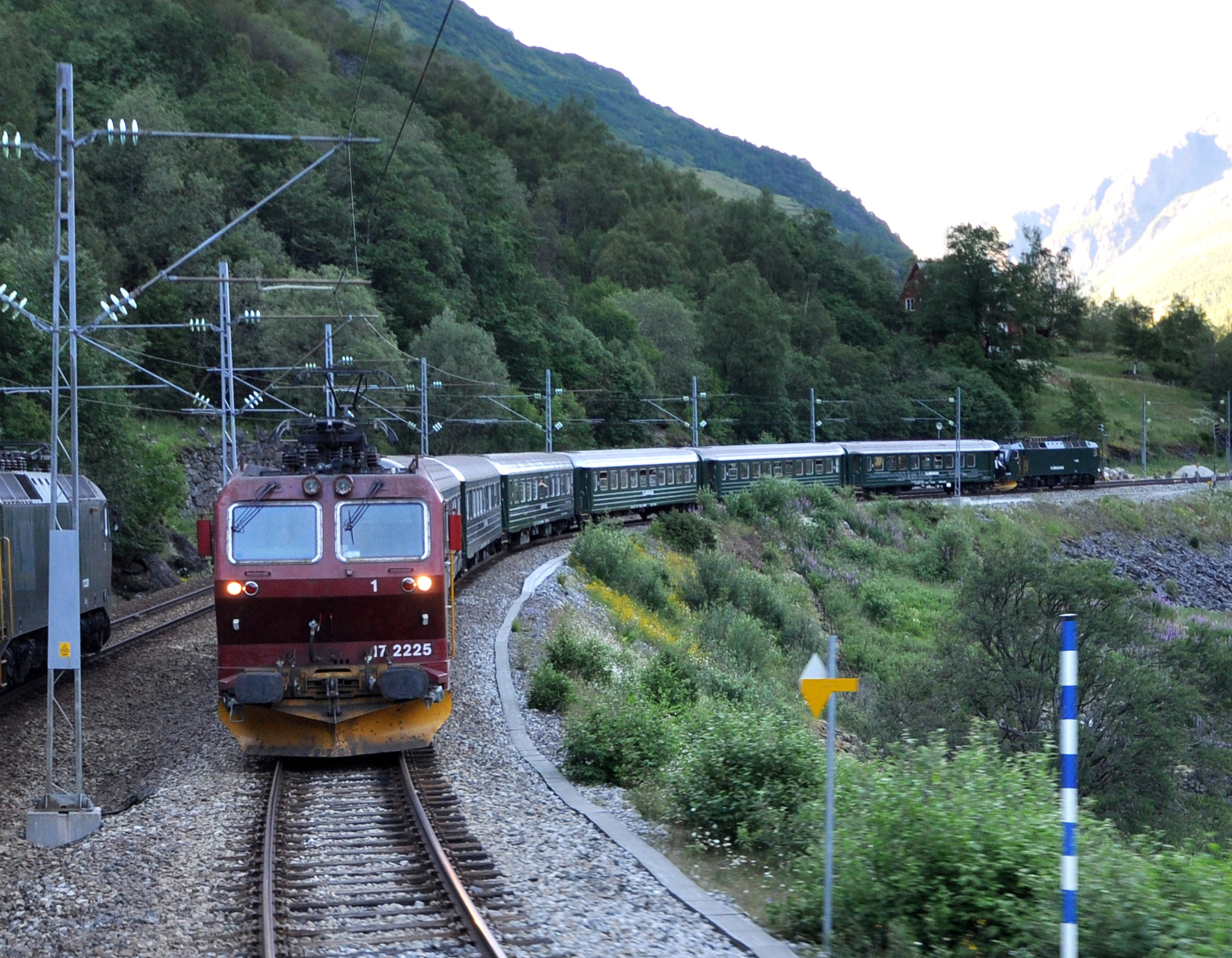
- View of the station

General information
- Location: Berekvam, Aurland Municipality; Norway
- Coordinates: 60.78828°N 7.09575°E
- Elevation: 344 m (1,129 ft)
- System: Railway station
- Owner: Bane NOR
- Operator: Flåm Utvikling (Vy)
- Line: Flåmsbanen
- Distance: 336.93 km (209.36 mi)

History
- Opened: 1 August 1940
Location

Berekvam Station (Norwegian: Berekvam holdeplass) is a railway station on the Flåm Line in Aurland Municipality, Norway. It is 10.51 kilometers (6.53 mi) from Myrdal Station, 346.31 kilometers (215.19 mi) from Oslo Central Station and 344 meters (1,129 ft) above mean sea level. The station opened on 1 August 1940 and has the only passing loop on the railway line.

Preceding station		Following station
Dalsbotn	Flåm Line	Blomheller
