= Lunden Station =

Railway station in Aurland, Norway

Lunden Station Lunden stasjon
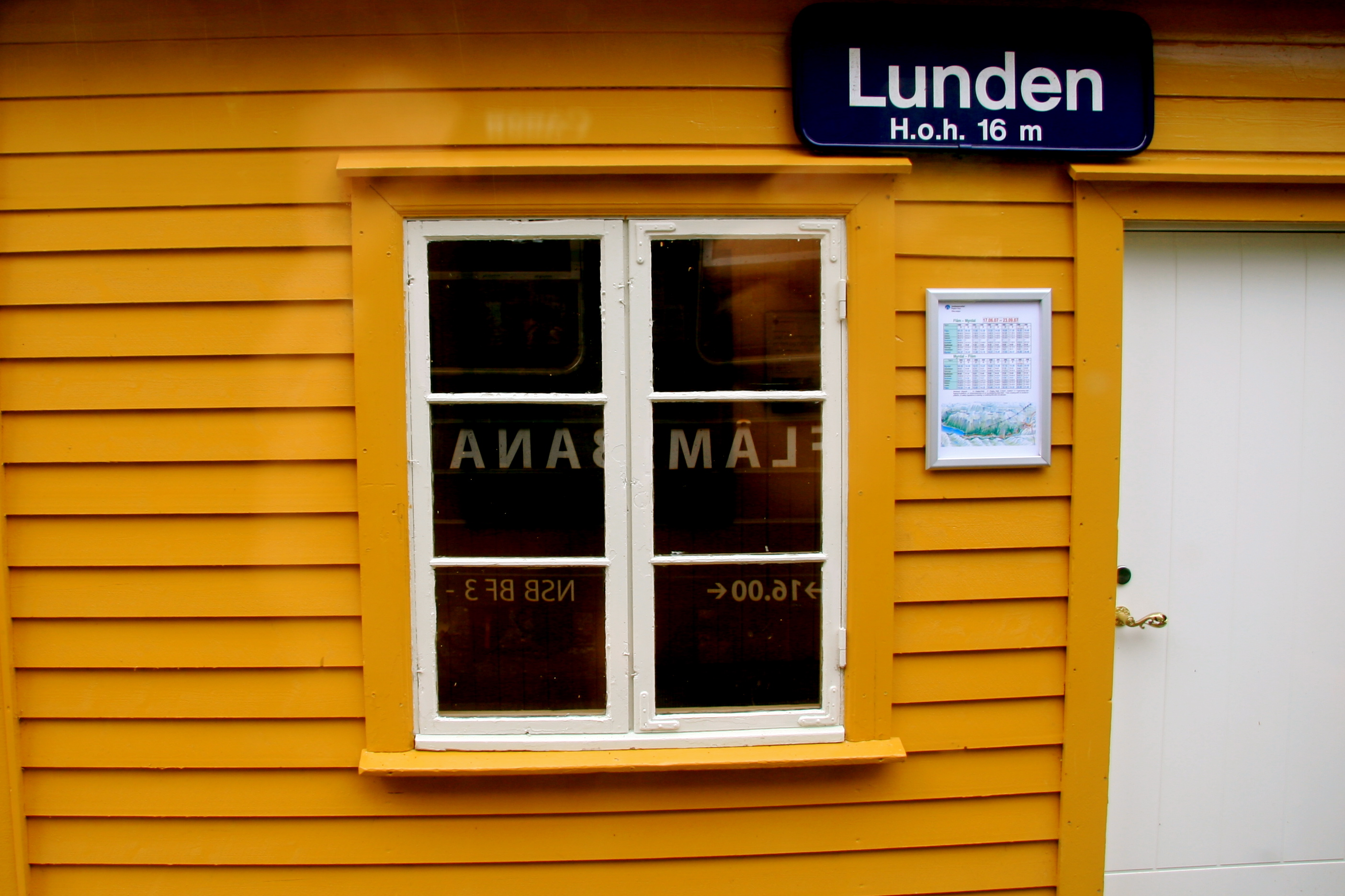
- View of the station

General information
- Location: Lunden, Aurland Municipality; Norway
- Coordinates: 60.85077°N 7.11384°E
- Elevation: 16 m (52 ft)
- System: Railway station
- Owner: Bane NOR
- Operator: Flåm Utvikling (Vy)
- Line: Flåmsbanen
- Distance: 354.30 km (220.15 mi)
- Platforms: 1

History
- Opened: 1942
Location

Lunden Station (Norwegian: Lunden holdeplass) is a railway station on the Flåm Line at Lunden in Aurland Municipality, Norway. It is located 18.60 kilometres (11.56 mi) from Myrdal Station, 336.93 kilometres (209.36 mi) from Oslo Central Station, and 16 metres (52 ft) above mean sea level. The station opened in 1942.

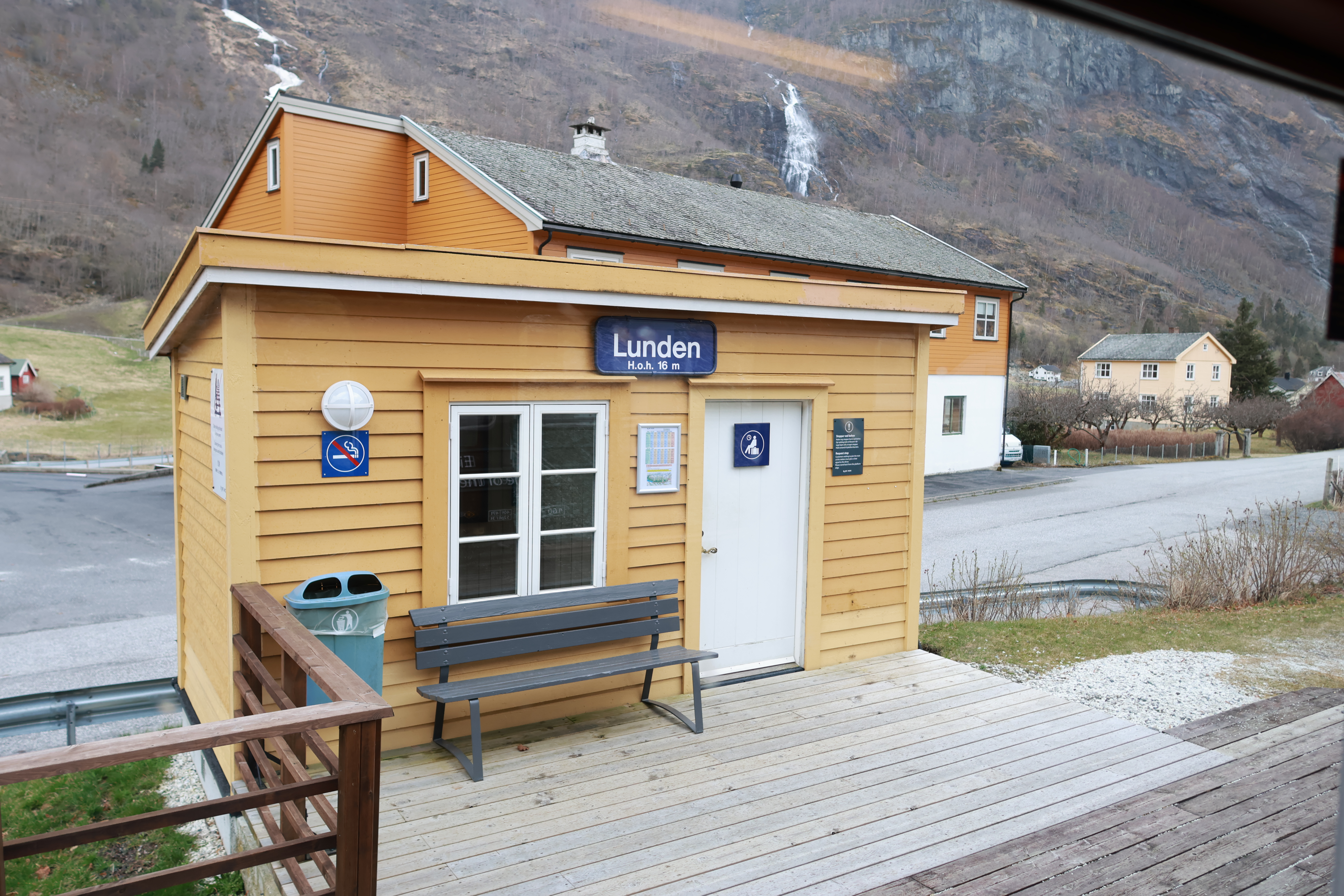
Lunden Station

Preceding station		Following station
Flåm	Flåm Line	Håreina
