= Vatnahalsen Station =

Railway station in Aurland, Norway

Vatnahalsen Station Vatnahalsen stasjon
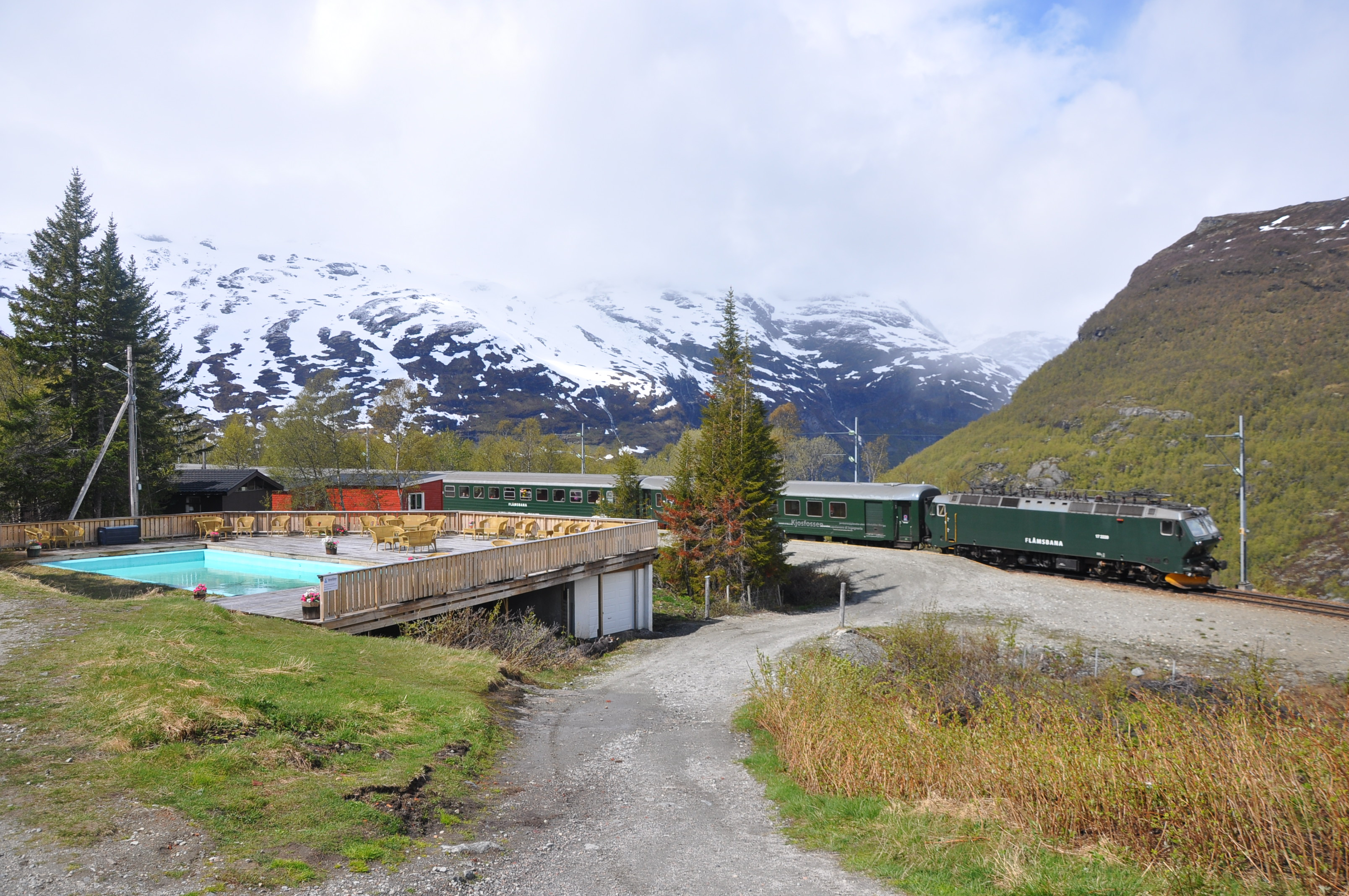
- View of the Flåmsbana at Vatnahalsen

General information
- Location: Vatnahalsen, Aurland Municipality; Norway
- Coordinates: 60.7438°N 7.12984°E
- Elevation: 811.3 m (2,662 ft)
- System: Railway station
- Owner: Bane NOR
- Operator: Flåm Utvikling (Vy)
- Line: Flåmsbanen
- Distance: 336.93 km (209.36 mi)
- Platforms: 1

History
- Opened: 1 August 1940
Location

Vatnahalsen Station (Norwegian: Vatnahalsen holdeplass) is a railway station on the Flåm Line in Aurland Municipality, Norway. It is located 1.13 kilometers (0.70 mi) from Myrdal Station, 336.93 kilometers (209.36 mi) from Oslo Central Station, and 811.3 meters (2,662 ft) above mean sea level. The station opened on 1 August 1940.

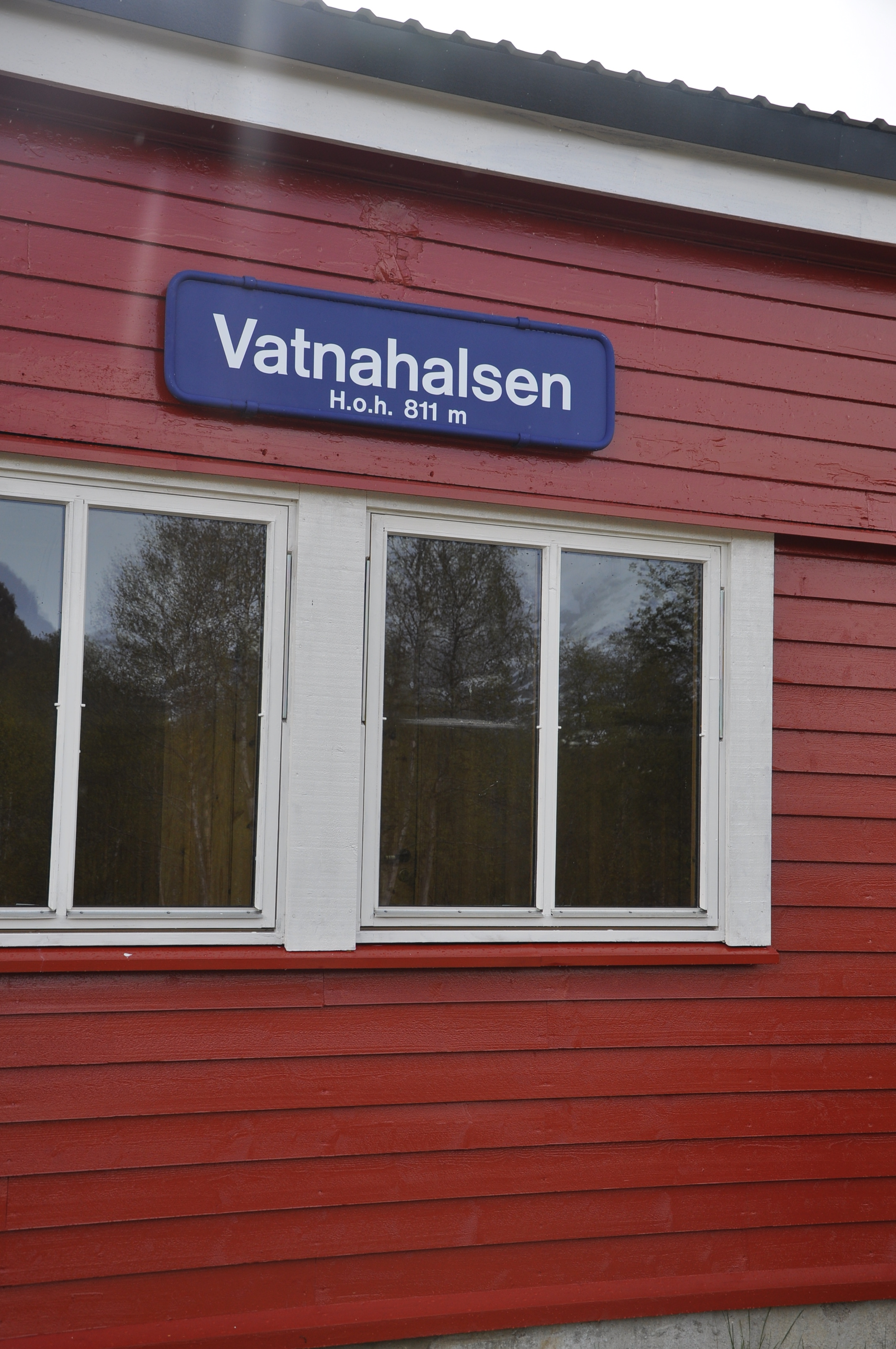
Vatnahalsen

Preceding station		Following station
Reinunga	Flåm Line	Myrdal
