= Flåm Line =

Railway line in Aurland, Norway

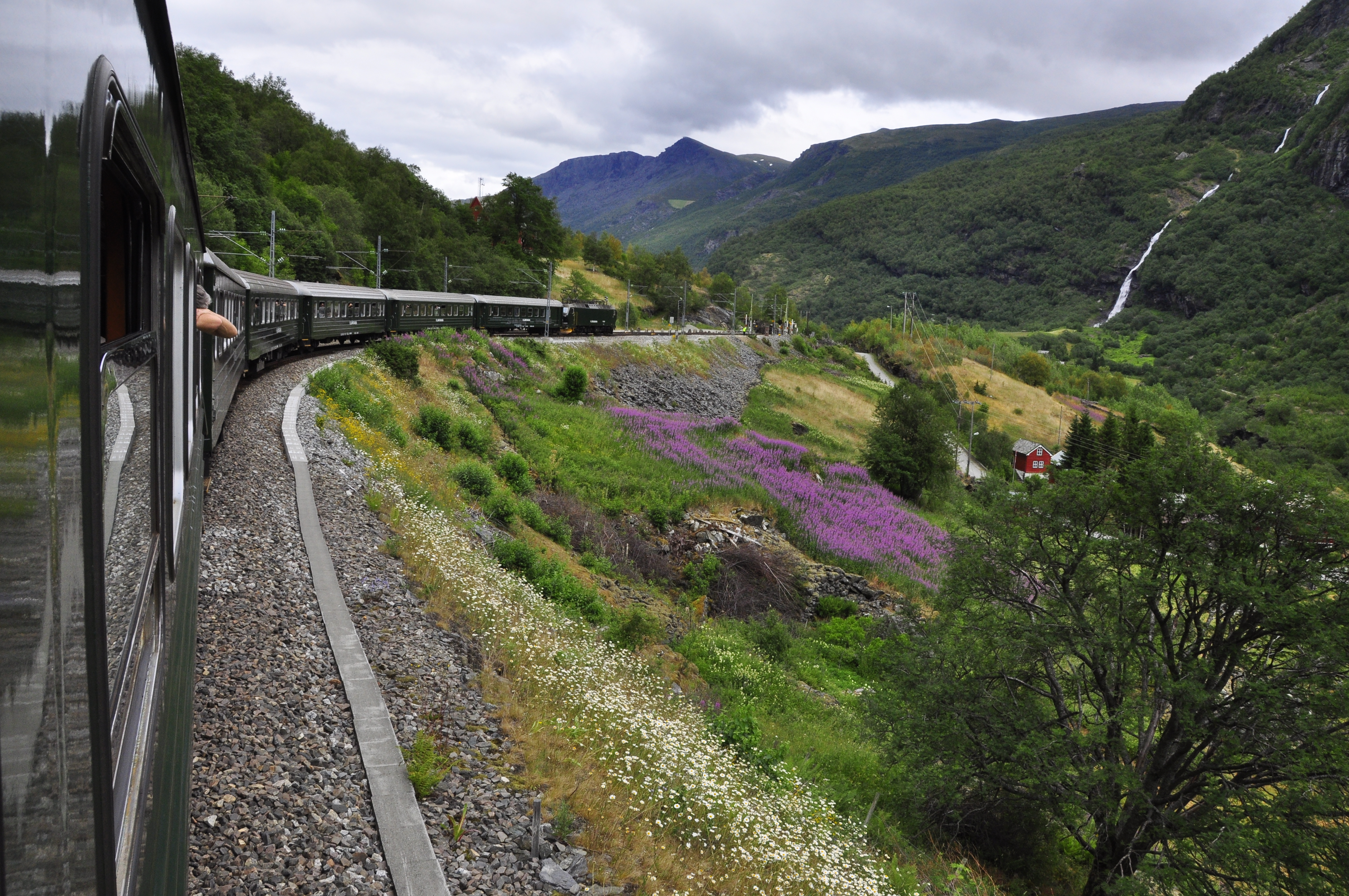
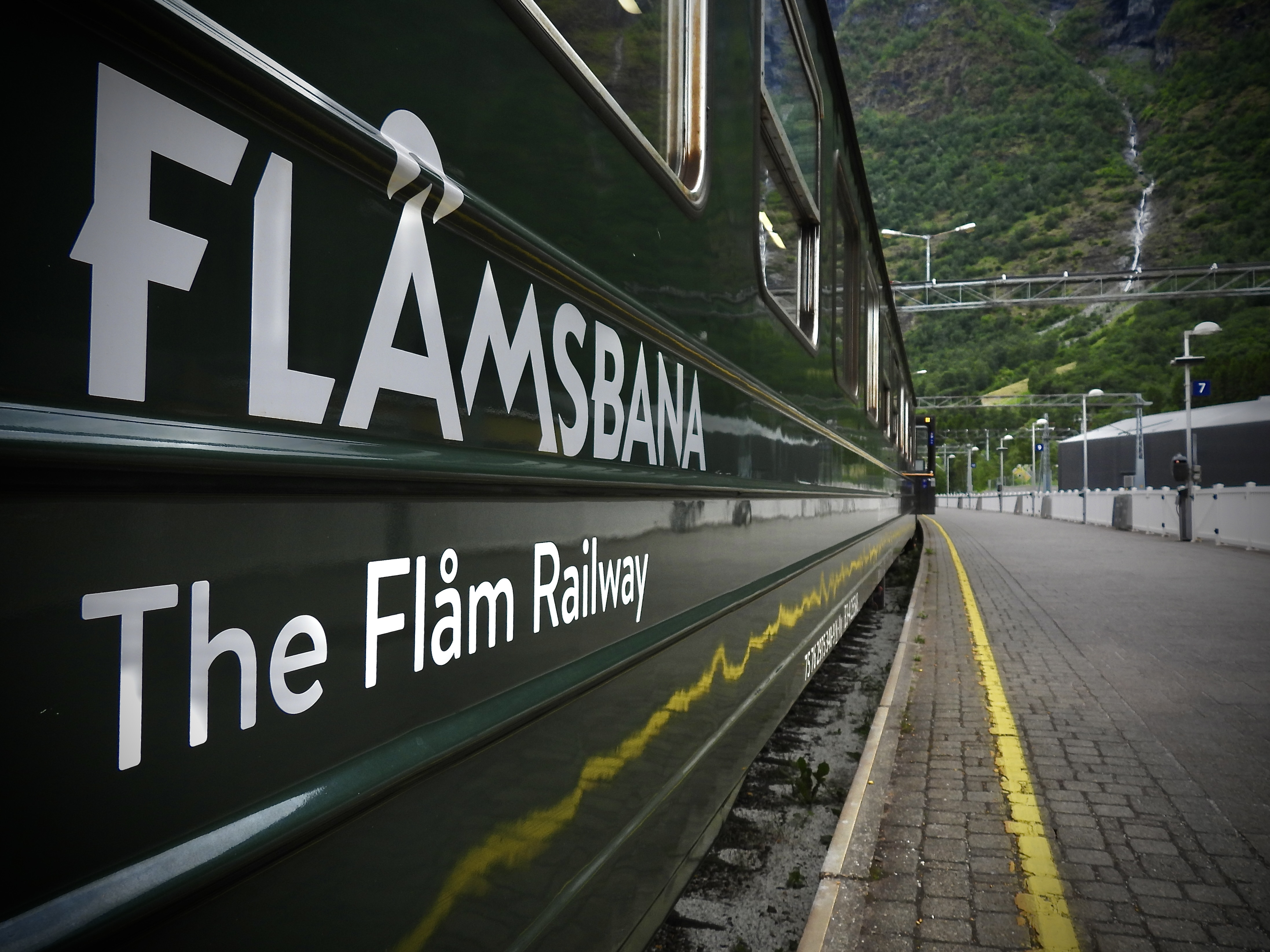
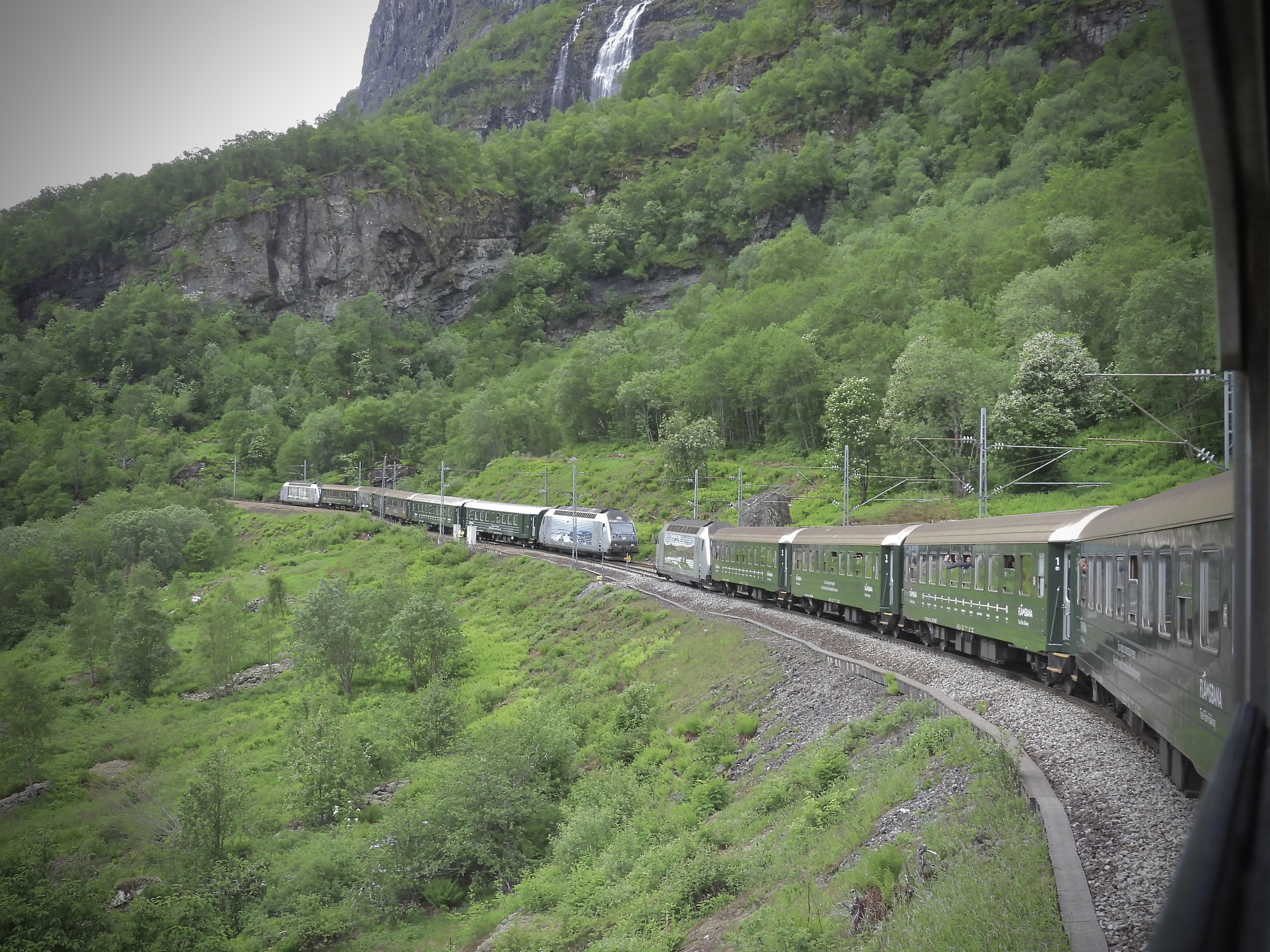
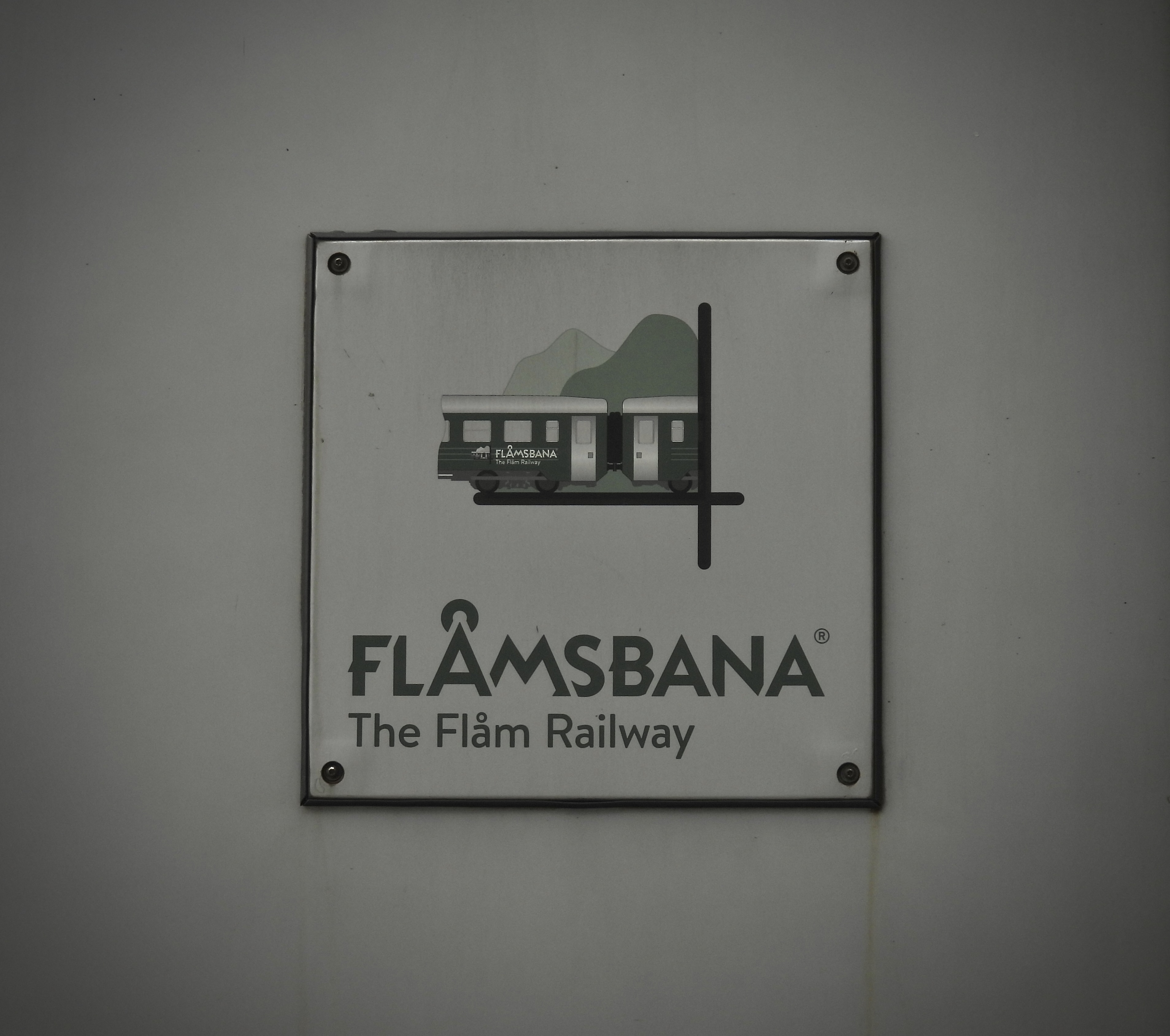
- The diminishing perspective while looking down the platform beside the Flåmsbana Flåm Railway passenger car. Two Flåmsbana Trains meet and pass as the Brekkefossen Waterfall cascades above. Flåmsbana - The Flåm Railway - reads the white & green placard.

Overview
- Owner: Bane NOR
- Coordinates: 60.77°N 7.10°E
- Termini: Myrdal; Flåm
- Stations: 11

Service
- Type: Railway
- System: Rail transport in Norway
- Operator: Flåm Utvikling (Vy)
- Rolling stock: El 18

History
- Opened: 15 October 1941; 85 years ago

Technical
- Line length: 20.2 km (12.6 mi)
- Number of tracks: Single
- Character: Tourist trains
- Track gauge: 1,435 mm (4 ft 8 1/2 in) standard gauge
- Electrification: 15 kV 16.7 Hz AC
- Operating speed: 40 km/h (25 mph)
- Highest elevation: 866 m (2,841 ft) AMSL

The Flåm Line (Norwegian: Flåmsbana) is a 20.2-kilometer (12.6 mi) long railway line between Myrdal and Flåm in Aurland Municipality, in Vestland county, Norway. A branch line of the Bergen Line, it runs through the valley of Flåmsdalen and connects the mainline with Sognefjord. The line's elevation difference is 866 meters (2,841 ft); it has ten stations, twenty tunnels and one bridge. The maximum gradient is 5.5 percent (1:18). Because of its steep gradient and picturesque nature, the Flåm Line is now almost exclusively a tourist service and has become the third-most visited tourist attraction in Norway.

Construction of the line started in 1924, with the line opening in 1940. It allowed the district of Sogn access to Bergen and Oslo via the Bergen Line. Electric traction was taken into use in 1944; at first El 9 locomotives were used, and from 1982 El 11. Until 1991, the train connected with a ferry service from Flåm to Gudvangen. In 1992, freight services were terminated, and due to low ticket prices and high operating costs, the line was nearly closed. In 1998, Flåm Utvikling took over marketing and ticket sale for the line, prices were heavily increased and El 17 locomotives were introduced (replaced by El 18 in 2014). The trains remain operated by the Vy as a subcontractor for Flåm Utvikling, while the line itself is owned and operated by the Bane NOR.

== Route ==
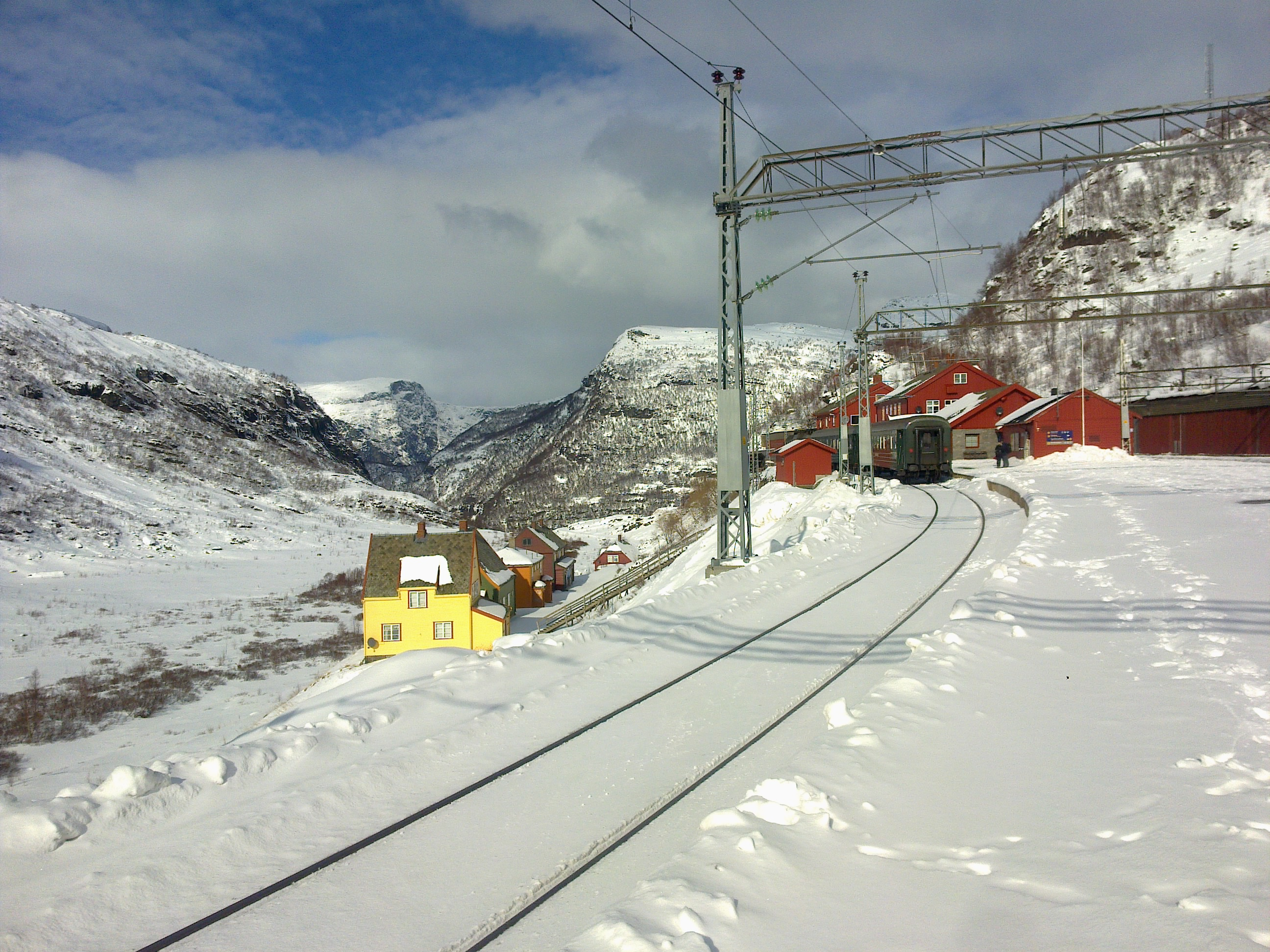
The Flåm Line starts at Myrdal Station, where it connects with the Bergen Line.

The Flåm Line runs from Myrdal on the Bergen Line to Flåm. Myrdal Station is located in a mountain pass at 863.6 meters (2,833 ft) above mean sea level (AMSL), while Flåm Station is located at 2.0 meters (6 ft 7 in) AMSL. The line's maximum gradient is 5.5 percent, and 16.1 kilometers (10.0 mi) of the line's 20.20 kilometers (12.55 mi) have at least 2.8 percent gradient. The line has standard gauge and a minimum curve radius of 130 meters (430 ft), and is the steepest standard-gauge railway in Europe. Maximum permitted speed upwards is 40 km/h (25 mph), while it is 30 km/h (19 mph) downhill. The line has eight stops, twenty tunnels and one bridge. The line is electrified at 15 kV 16.7 Hz AC using overhead wire, and is equipped with Global System for Mobile Communications – Railway (GSM-R), but lacks centralized traffic control (CTC). The infrastructure is owned and operated by the Norwegian National Rail Administration.

At Myrdal Station, the Flåm Line runs in the same direction as the trains towards Oslo, but immediately starts running downwards into Flåmsdalen. The first part of the line runs through snow shelters and several short tunnels. Vatnahalsen Station is located 1.13 kilometers (0.70 mi) from Myrdal, at 811 meters (2,661 ft) AMSL. The line then runs through a horseshoe curve and the 880-meter-long (2,890 ft) Vatnahalsen Tunnel. It exits the tunnel onto an artificial shelf on a cliff which falls several hundred meters down. Reinunga Station is located 2.20 kilometers (1.37 mi) from Myrdal and at 767 meters (2,516 ft) elevation. It is followed by Kjosfossen Station, 4.40 kilometers (2.73 mi) from Myrdal and 670 meters (2,200 ft) AMSL, which serves no other purpose than allowing tourists to look at the waterfall Kjosfossen.

The line then runs through the 1,341.5-meter-long (4,401 ft) Nåli Tunnel, the longest on the line. At the end of the tunnel lies Kårdal Station, traditionally serving the farm furthest up in the valley. The station is 6.34 kilometers (3.94 mi) from Myrdal and 557 meters (1,827 ft) AMSL. On the other side of the valley is Trodlatoppen, the site of several avalanches every year. The line then runs through the 1,029-meter-long (3,376 ft) Blomheller Tunnel, after which it reaches Blomheller Station, 8.40 kilometers (5.22 mi) from Myrdal and 458 meters (1,503 ft) AMSL. The railway then crosses the river Flåmselvi and runs through a series of short tunnels.

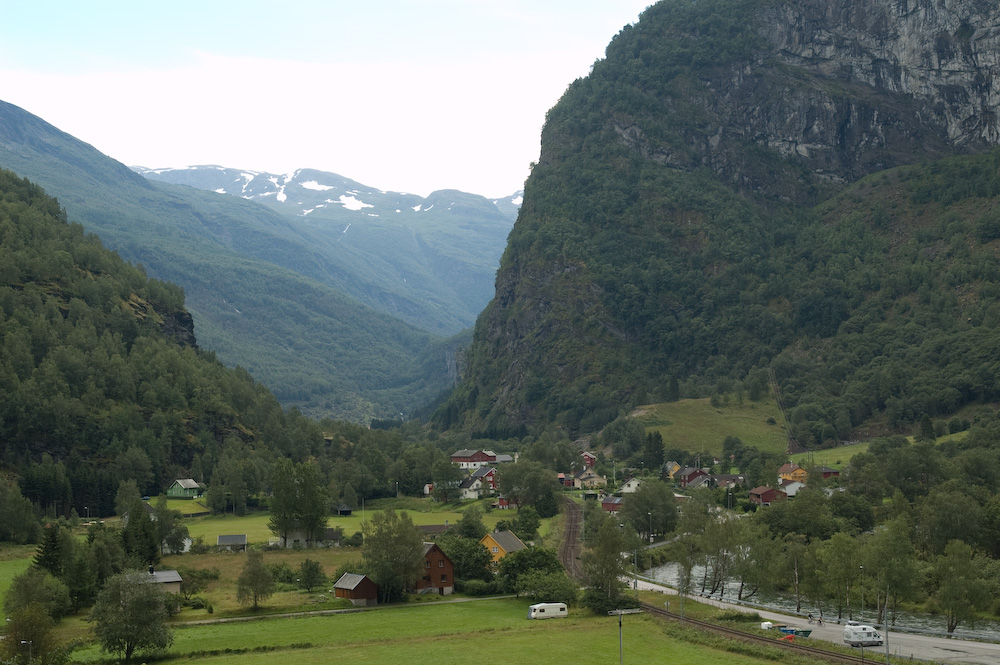
In the lower parts, the valley widens and flattens out.

At 10.51 kilometers (6.53 mi) from Myrdal, the line reaches Berekvam Station, located at 344 meters (1,129 ft) AMSL. It is the only station to have a passing loop and thus the only location on the line where trains can meet. Because the station is unstaffed and lacks CTC, crossing must be performed using flags at day and torches at night, set by personnel who travel from Myrdal or Flåm. At Høga, the railway crosses the river again, this time by the river running in a tunnel under the tracks. The next station is Dalsbotn Station, located 13.90 kilometers (8.64 mi) from Myrdal and at 199 meters (653 ft) AMSL. Just before reaching the last tunnel, the 424-meter (1,391 ft) long Furuberget Tunnel, the line passes by the waterfall Rjoandefossen, which with a 140-meter (460 ft) vertical drop is one of the line's main attractions.

After Håreina Station, located 17.21 kilometers (10.69 mi) from Myrdal at 48 meters (157 ft) elevation, the valley widens and changes character, becoming flatter and with more vegetation. After passing Lunden Station, 18.60 kilometers (11.56 mi) from Myrdal and at 16 meters (52 ft) elevation, the line reaches the terminus at Flåm. Located on Aurlandsfjord, a branch of the Sognefjord, Flåm has 400 residents and is nearly exclusively a tourist area, featuring amongst other things a hotel and a cruise ship port. The station also has a railway museum dedicated to the Flåm Line.

== History ==
=== Planning ===
Plans to build a railway to connect Norway's two largest cities, Oslo and Bergen, were launched by Andreas Tanberg Gløersen in 1871. He proposed that the line run via Hallingdal and Voss and include two short branch lines which would connect to the two major fjord systems in the area, Sognefjord and Hardangerfjord. The narrow gauge Voss Line from Bergen to Voss opened in 1883, and the Bergen Line was completed as standard gauge in 1909. During the construction of the Bergen Line, the path that ran up Flåmsdalen was upgraded by NSB to allow access to the area around Myrdal. This road was used by horse carriages and later cars, becoming an important access route to the area, but it was too steep and narrow for heavy vehicles. The Hardanger Line, which connected the Bergen Line to Hardangerfjord, opened in 1935, and was the county's first railway to open with electric traction.

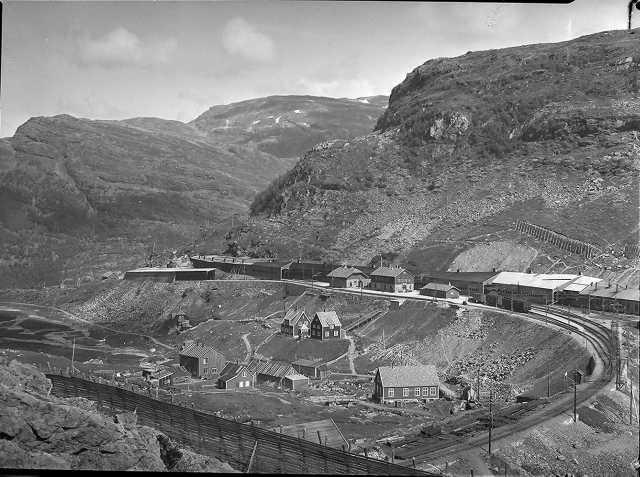
Myrdal Station (here pictured in 1942) opened in 1908 as part of the Bergen Line.

The first engineering surveys for the Flåm Line were performed in 1893. It resulted in a proposal for a 1,067 mm (3 ft 6 in) narrow gauge railway which would be 18.0 kilometers (11.2 mi) long. Most of the railway would be built as an adhesion railway with a 2.5 percent gradient, although part of it would be a rack railway with a gradient of 10.0 percent. It was at the time estimated to cost 3.3 million Norwegian krone (NOK). In 1904, a radically different route to Sognefjord was proposed: a 47.13-kilometer (29.29 mi) long adhesion line from Voss to Gudvangen via Stalheim. It was estimated to cost NOK 3.5 million, but was considered by local politicians to be inferior to the Flåm alternative. A third alternative was a combined tramway and funicular, which would be built between Myrdal and Fretheim. It was estimated to cost NOK 800,000, but NSB was concerned that the proposal's light rolling stock would not be sufficient to operate through snow during the winter. Estimated traffic for the Flåm Line was 22,000 annual passengers.

As both the other alternatives were discarded, consensus gradually grew for the Flåm alternative, and the Railway Committee for Nordre Bergenhus County recommended this proposal. New plans from NSB criticized the mix of rack and adhesion railway, and instead proposed a conventional adhesion line all the way. Engineer Ferdinand Bjerke traveled to Continental Europe to study several combined railways. He published a preliminary report in 1911, which recommended an adhesion railway, although he also felt the need for a detailed study of a rack railway. His final report was finished in 1913, and although it recommended adhesion, it pointed out that the line's capacity would be smaller than predicted and that costs would be three times as high—NOK 5.5 million. The plans were approved by the Ministry of Labour and NSB's main board in 1915.

The plans were approved by Parliament in 1916. However, the decision concerning technical specifications was not taken by Parliament until 1923, when it decided that the line was to be electric. The line was then estimated to cost NOK 14.5 million—the increase caused by inflation during the First World War—of which NOK 1.2 million was to be paid by the local governments. The line was to have tracks which weighed 25 kilograms per meter (50 lb/yd). The curve radius was set to minimum 150 meters (490 ft), although exceptionally 125 meters (410 ft) was permitted. The steepest permitted gradient was 5.5 percent (1:18).

In 1915, the first proposal was launched for using a bus service as an alternative to the train. This was rejected because buses were not able to give the comfort and reliability of a train. The idea was proposed again in 1922 by the director of the Norwegian Public Roads Administration. Among the strongest opponents to the bus alternative was Ingolf Elster Christensen, County Governor of Sogn og Fjordane and later parliamentarian, who stated that the Nordre Bergenhus County (today Sogn og Fjordane County Municipality) had paid part of the regional financing of the Bergen Line on condition that they receive a branch line to the Sognefjord.

The 1920s saw high inflation and large public deficits. Several public committees were created solely to cut costs. One such proposal was to build a road to Flåm, with the proposal being led by Hans Kristian Seip, who was director of Bergen Public Road Administration. In 1925, following the appointment of Mowinckel's First Cabinet, it was proposed that the railway be built as a road, and the tracks laid later. One of NSB's board members proposed instead building a suspended railway. The plans to cancel the railway were stopped because of parliamentarian support for the railway. Part of the political support was because there was agreement on a national railway plan, and removing parts of it would disrupt the geographical compromise. However, Parliament did vote to reduce the number of intermediate stations to one, which would allow trains to meet at Berekvam. The cost saving for a road was estimated at 30 percent. The issue of a road was taken up in a new vote in Parliament in 1927, but was again rejected.

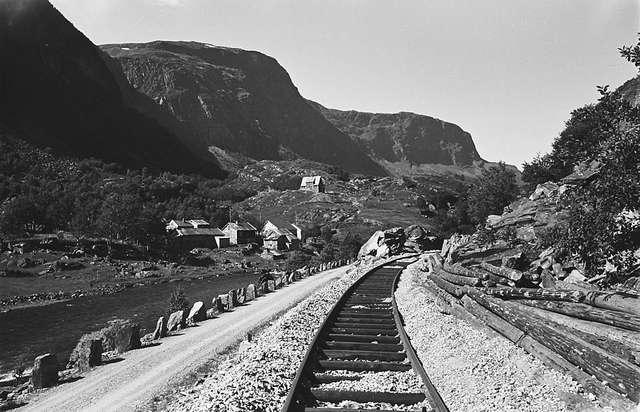
Construction of the line at Melhus in 1939

=== Construction ===
The administration office for the construction was established in 1923 and was until 1935 located at Voss. In that period, construction was led by Peter Bernhard Kristian Lahlum, who was also responsible for the Hardanger Line. After the Hardanger Line was completed, Lahlum retired, and the office was moved to Flåm where responsibility was taken over by Adolph M. B. Kielland. To start with, there were 120 men working on the construction, although this quickly increased to 220. The numbers fluctuated between that and as low as 80, although hit an all-time high of 280 people in 1937. To house the employees, eight barracks were built. Among the first things built were housing and station buildings, which could then be used by people working on the construction. The local economy was stimulated by farmers being paid for transport. Using horses, they would transport tourists by day and building materials by night. The competition was fierce, resulting in fights for customers, although it calmed down after traffic police were introduced.

In 1924, there was a landslide at Høga, covering the area planned for the railway. The area was made of phyllite and was the geologically most unstable area on the route. The initial response was to plan for a tunnel past the area, but this was quickly rejected because of the high price. Instead, the line was moved further away from the mountain side. Other slides during construction included an avalanche near Store Reppa on 10 February 1925, which deposited up to 3.5 meters (11 ft) of earth. In April 1925, a 1,000 cubic meters (35,000 cu ft) landslide took place above Berekvam. On 8 February 1928, an avalanche did some damage to the right-of-way near Nåli.

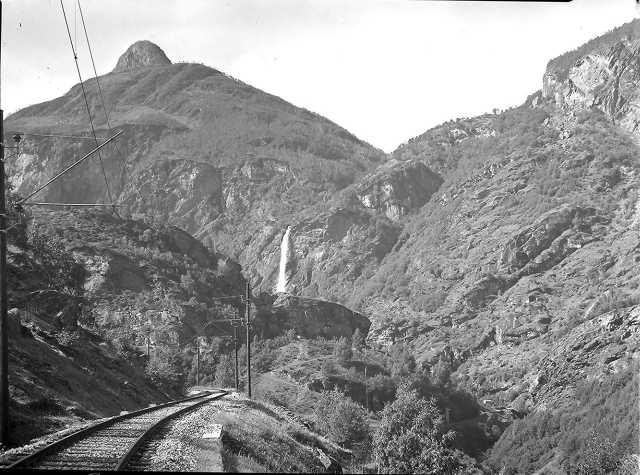
The line near Rjoandefossen in 1942

The tunnels were the most difficult and time-consuming part of construction. Of the twenty tunnels, machines were only used for the Nåli and Vatnahalsen Tunnels—the rest were built by hand. Hand-construction was done by drilling up to 4.2 meters (14 ft) through the rock, filling the holes with dynamite and blasting. Construction of tunnels started in 1924 and the first tunnel was completed in 1926; the last tunnel was completed in 1935. On average, tunneling proceeded at between 116 and 180 man-hours per meter (35–55 hr/ft). The work caused death or lifelong respiratory problems through silicosis caused by inhaling the smoke. There were two fatal accidents, one in 1925 and one 1938, both related to tunnel work.

Ten stations were built for the line, including a major upgrade to Myrdal and port facilities at Flåm. Myrdal Station was given side tracks and additional buildings to serve transferring passengers, with the upgrades costing NOK 0.5 million. Berekvam was the only place on-route which received a passing loop. Flåm Station cost NOK 0.8 million and was designed in the 1930s NSB simple wooden functionalist style, similar to what is found on the Nordland Line and the Sørland Line. Other stations received small, wooden buildings with a waiting room, as well as a room for cargo at Vatnahalsen, Håreina and Dalsbotn.

Laying of tracks started in 1936, and was assisted by two steam locomotives. The work started at Myrdal and reached Reinunga the first year, Kjosfossen Tunnel the second year and the Blomheller Tunnel in 1939. The first train to operate on a regular schedule was in October 1939, when a freight train between Myrdal and Berekvam ran three times a week. However, this service was stopped by the end of the month. With the German occupation of Norway in 1940, work started later in the season, but the German authorities wanted to speed up the work to make the line usable for steam trains that same year. They scheduled the line for completion in 1942. Track laying work was accelerated by increasing the number of workers from 58 to 195. Regular freight operation on the Flåm Line started on 1 August 1940, albeit limited to an axle load of 12 tonnes (12 long tons; 13 short tons). At the time there were four trains each day, two in each direction.

Passenger trains started running on 10 February 1941, also with two trains in each direction per day. Travel time was 65 minutes downhill and 80 minutes uphill. The official name of the line was decided by the ministry on 26 June 1941. From 1 May 1942, Rolf Aksnes took over as head engineer after Kielland. During construction of the Bergen Line in 1898, the upper part of Kjosfossen had been built up with a hydroelectric power station. Another power station was built there, and taken into use on 27 October 1944. Built by Kværner and Norsk Elektrisk & Brown Boveri (NEBB), it had a power output of 1,700 kilowatts (2,300 hp).

The costs for the project ended at NOK 26,651,900, of which NOK 22.0 million was for the railway. This total included NOK 2.3 million for a power station and NOK 1.2 million for a ferry quay at Flåm. The largest cost was for earthwork, which ended at NOK 9.1 million; other major costs were NOK 2.4 million for rolling stock, NOK 1.6 million for stations, NOK 1.2 for tracks, NOK 1.5 million for snow protection and NOK 675,000 for electrification.

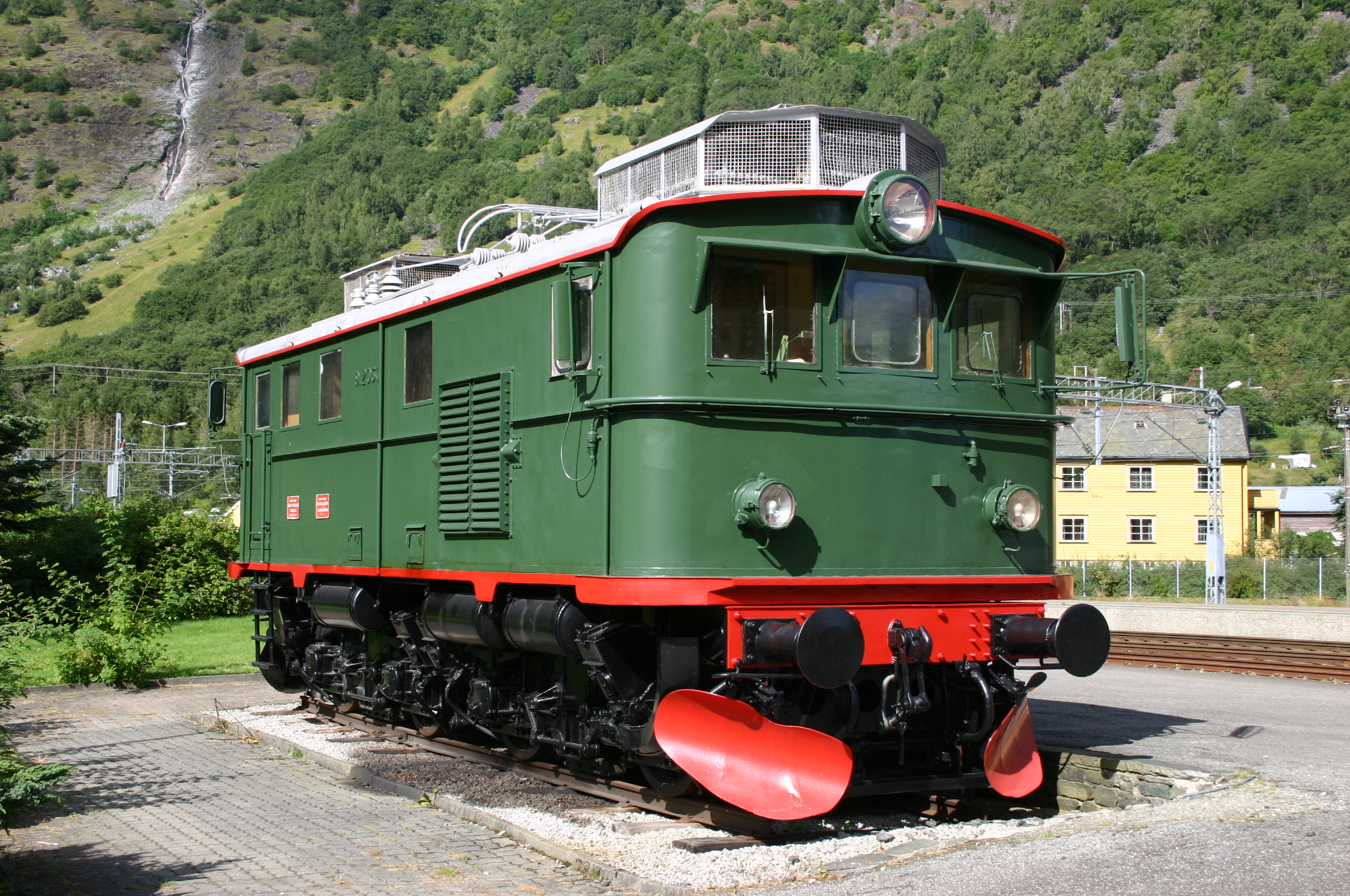
El 9.2063 at display at Flåm

=== Operation ===
Regular operation with electric locomotives was introduced on 25 November 1944. To begin with, Class 64 railcars were used. NSB had originally planned to use electric multiple units, but changed the plans during the war and instead decided to use locomotives and cars. The Class 64 trains remained in service on the Flåm Line until May 1947. They were normally used on the Hardanger Line, but were regularly taken back into use on the Flåm Line when the traffic was at its lowest.

NSB ordered three El 9 locomotives from Thune on 4 October 1940. The units were delivered in 1942, with the electrical components from NEBB and the transformers and controllers from Per Kure. A delay was caused by bombing of Per Kure by the resistance. The locomotives were custom-built for the steep gradients on the Flåm and Hardanger Lines, and were delivered with an axle load of 12 tonnes (12 long tons; 13 short tons) and a Bo'Bo' wheel configuration. The locomotives weighed 48 tonnes (47 long tons; 53 short tons) and the maximum permitted train weight was 85 tonnes (84 long tons; 94 short tons). If the trains were to stop at Kårdal, the weight was further limited to 65 tonnes (64 long tons; 72 short tons).

Initially, there were three trains on the Bergen Line in each direction per day, so only a single locomotive was necessary on the Flåm Line. From 1949 there were two locomotives on the Flåm Line and from 1955 all three were used there. Five passenger cars in aluminum were delivered by Strømmens Værksted. The cost of the three locomotives and five cars was NOK 2.4 million.

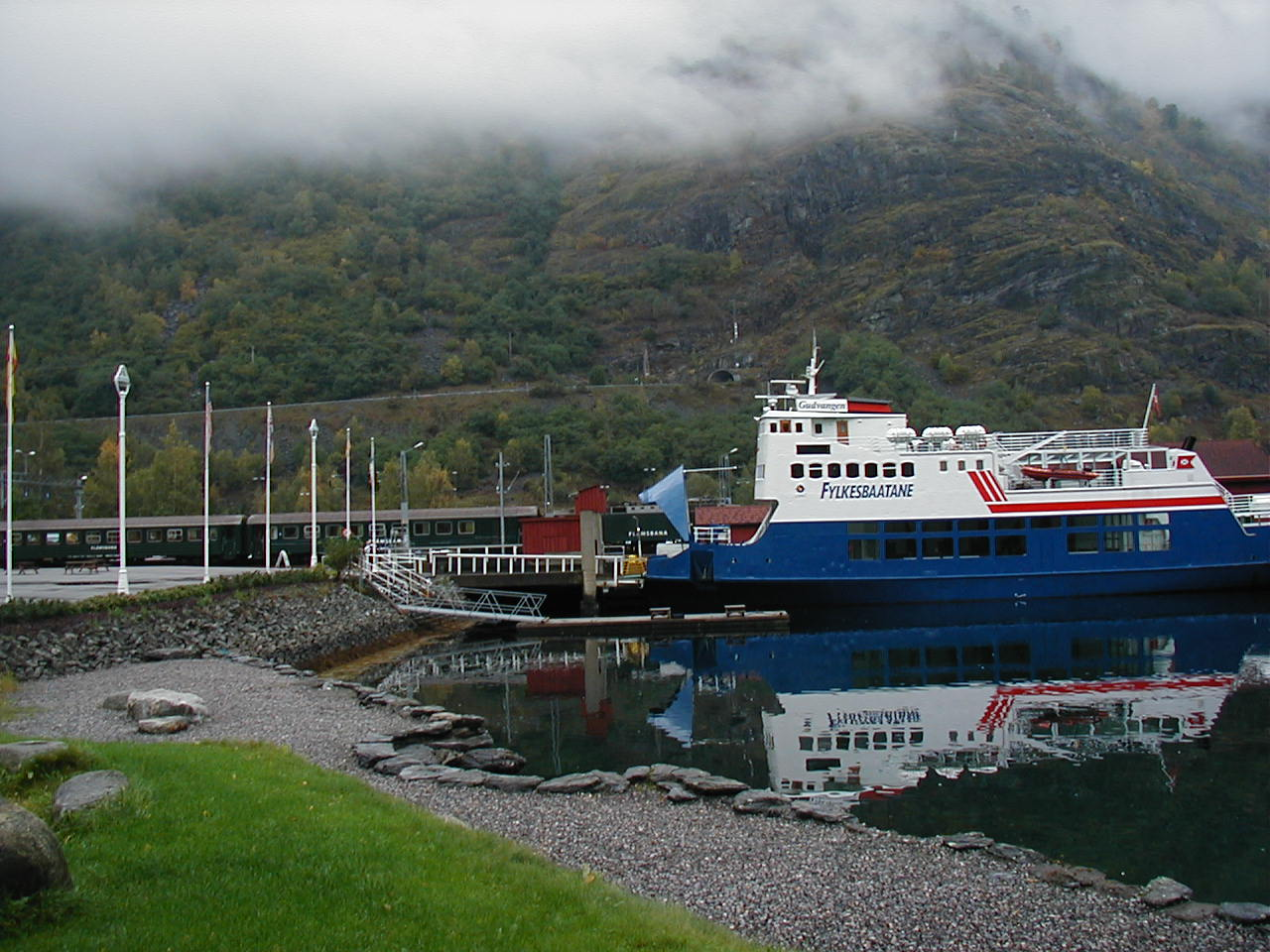
Until 1991, Flåm had a connection between trains and the ferry to Gudvangen. Today, the ferry is used mostly for tourist trips.

The railway quickly saw an increase in traffic, with an average 11 percent annual increase from the opening until the mid-1950s. In part to allow access to Kjosfossen, Kjosfossen Station was opened in 1951. By then, ridership had stabilized at 115,000 people per year. A significant portion of the traffic consisted of tourists, in part from cruise ships docked in Flåm. In the latter half of the decade, NSB launched the Norway in a Nutshell package, which included a ride on the Flåm Line. A sleeping car was introduced on the night train between Flåm and Oslo in 1958. It made three trips in each direction per week during the summer season, and achieved an 84 percent occupancy rate. The same year, Berekvam Station became unstaffed. Traffic remained stable throughout the 1960s, while interest in developing the railway for tourists declined and local politicians stated that a road was needed to attract tourists to Aurland. The power station was upgraded to 14,000 kilowatts (19,000 hp) in 1969.

In 1969, ridership increased by 10 percent and by 12 percent the following year. In 1971 and 1972, it saw a 20-percent increase—the latter representing the first year with InterRail tickets. By then the annual ridership had reached 175,000. In 1970, an additional train was stationed at Flåm, which made it possible to travel a round trip between Flåm and Bergen in a day. Between 1975 and 1982, NSB started running direct trains between Ål and Flåm. In 1978, the morning express trains on the Bergen Line started stopping at Myrdal, allowing better access for tourists to the Flåm Line. Traffic increased further until 1980, when it hit 200,000, and then remained stable through the decade.

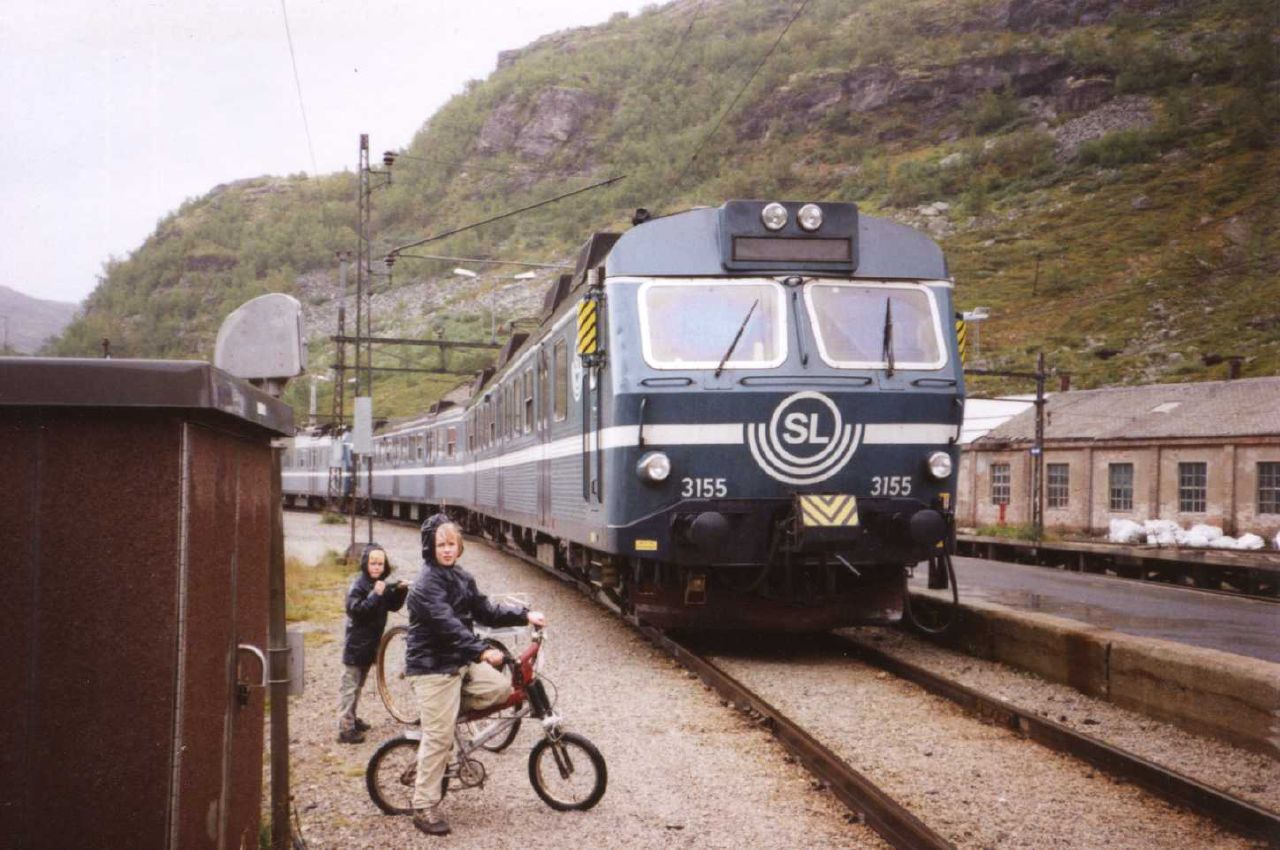
Swedish X10 trains were sometimes used during the summer season, here at Myrdal Station.

When the line opened, it received a lot of freight traffic for the construction of a power station in Årdal Municipality. From the opening, the Flåm Line was the fastest means of transport between Sogn and both Oslo and Bergen, and most post was also sent via the line. From 1977, most of the post was instead sent by truck via Gol, and only post from Aurland went via the railway. Other products sent by the line were milk to the dairy in Voss, which terminated in 1983, as well as fruit. Partial loads saw a large increase during the 1960s, after NSB and the ferry operator Fylkesbaatane i Sogn og Fjordane teamed up to send packages via Flåm to Oslo and Bergen. Flåm had several arrivals until 1973, when Linjegods was established. Following a reorganization, the number of calls was reduced to once per week. Freight volume fell further during the 1980s; an attempt in 1978 to force the three major distributors Linjegods, Firda Billag and Sogn Billag to route traffic via the Flåm Line failed.

During the 1970s, NSB started the process of finding a replacement for the El 9. New locomotives would cost NOK 20 million, and the company saw it as unrealistic to invest so much in a marginal branch line. NSB had also concluded its away-with-the-steam program, and therefore had a lack of locomotives in general. If a new class of locomotives was to be built, it would have to satisfy more than the requirements for the Flåm Line, so NSB instead started investigating whether any of the older models could be used. Tests were performed in 1971 and 1973 with El 11, built between 1951 and 1964, and El 13, built between 1957 and 1966. Neither was considered optimal: El 11 allowed the train weight to increase to 100 tonnes (98 long tons; 110 short tons), but the train had the steps for the voltage regulator and the commutation set for too high speeds. El 13 had rheostatic brakes, which were not suitable for the gradient; the locomotives were also better suited for mainline service and would therefore not be prioritized for branch lines.

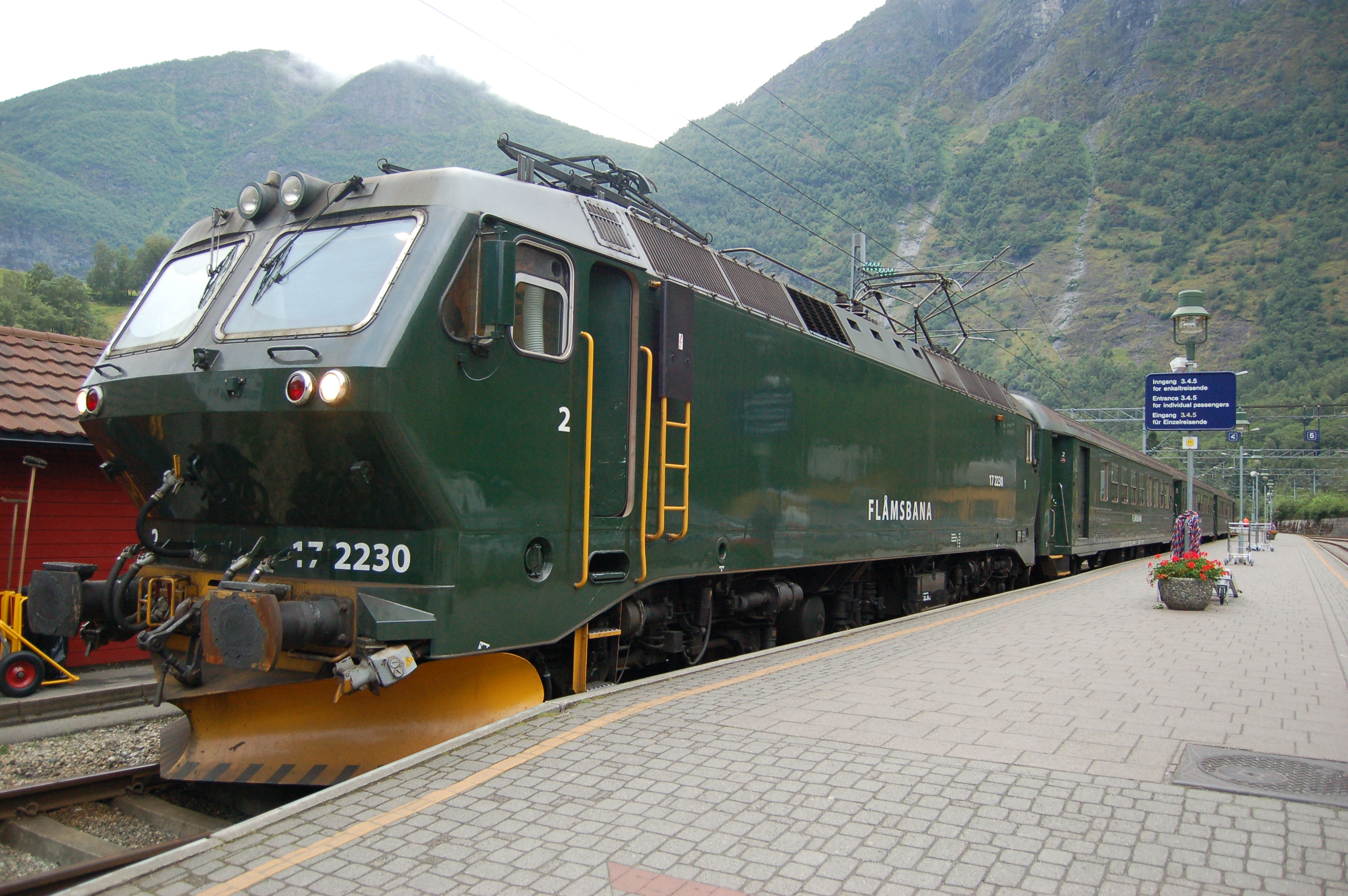
El 17 locomotives were in service between 1998 and 2014. These are now replaced by El 18.

In 1972, the Flåm Line was rebuilt to allow an axle load of 18 tonnes (18 long tons; 20 short tons). El 11 was chosen as El 9's replacement in the mid-1970s, but it was not until November 1980 that El 11.2098 started being rebuilt for its new service. Upgrades included rheostatic brakes and electromagnetic brakes, new speed measurement and curve lights. The locomotive was taken into use on the Flåm Line in June 1982. A year later, El 11.2092 was also taken into use after a similar rebuild. El 9 remained in sporadic use until 1989. Class 69 electric multiple units were taken into use starting on 10 August 1982. These had been allocated to Bergen District for use on the Bergen Commuter Rail, and were also used on the direct trains between Bergen and Flåm. The main disadvantage with the class was the small windows, as the trains were designed for commuter traffic rather than sight-seeing.

In 1990, a fast ferry service was introduced in Sogn with direct services to Bergen. In 1991, the Gudvangen Tunnel opened, giving Flåm a road connection to Gudvangen and terminating the ferry service; also the private road built eastbound over the mountain for hydro-power plants was converted to national road (no 50) and improved. NSB was losing money on the line, in part because of very low revenue per rider. The same ticket prices were charged as elsewhere, based on a fee per kilometer; the low speed combined with a lot of free travelers using InterRail tickets gave little revenue. From 1991, the ticket prices were increased as if the line was 20 kilometers (12 mi) longer. In 1992, a new station building was taken into use at Flåm. During the 1990s, X10 commuter trains from Stockholm were borrowed during the summer for extra trains. These trains had larger windows than Class 69, giving better views. A museum and documentation center was established in 1995. Originally located in an annex of Fretheim Hotel, it moved in 1999 to the old station building at Flåm.

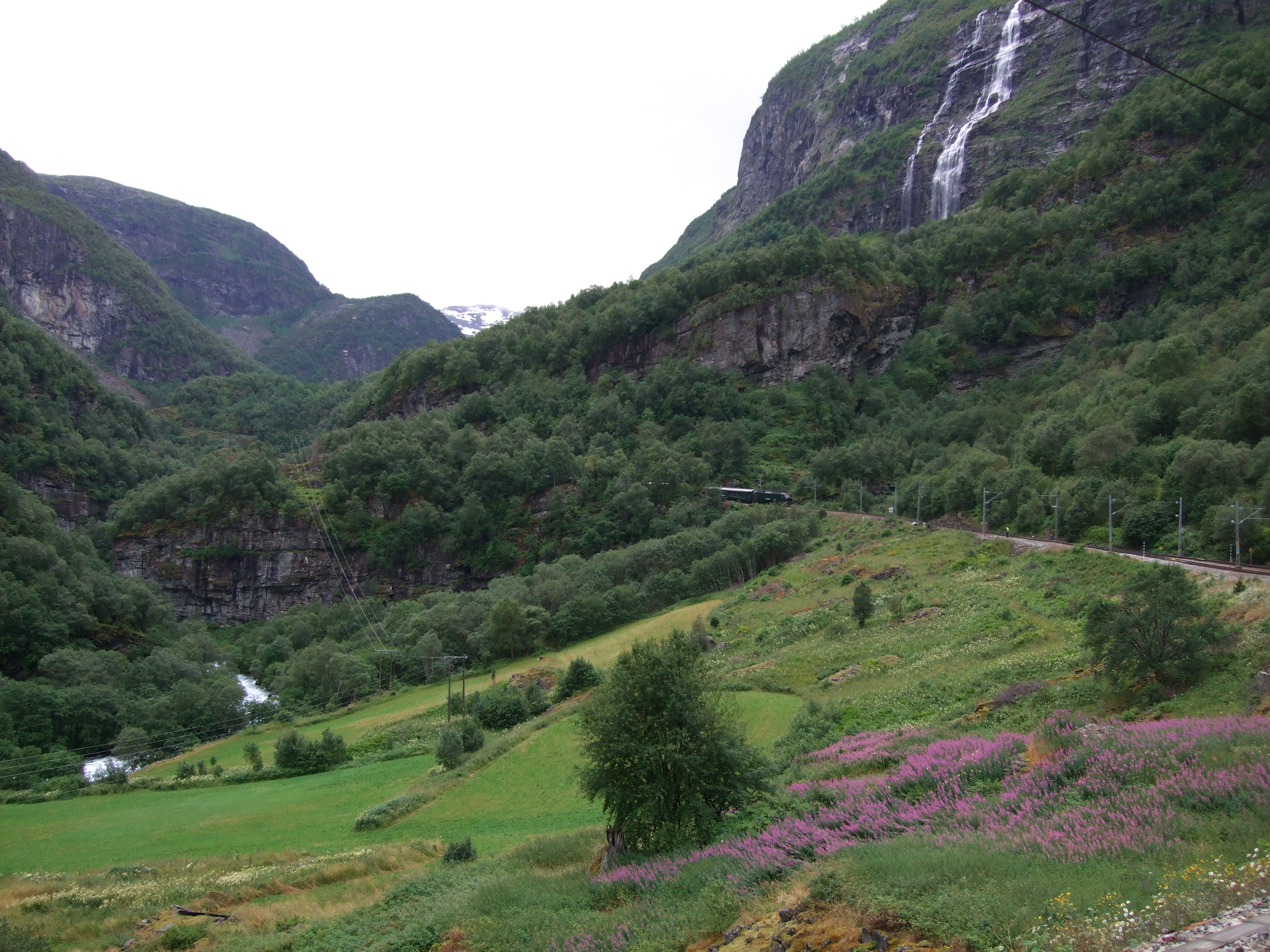
A section of the Flåm Line

In March 1997, NSB announced that they had plans to privatize the operations of the line from 1998. The responsibility for setting the schedule, selling tickets and marketing was transferred to Flåm Utvikling, a newly established company that NSB owned 49 percent of, and Aurland Ressursutvikling 51 percent. The latter was owned by Aurland Municipality, the Industrial Development Corporation of Norway and Aurland Sparebank, a local bank. Flåm Utvikling also took over responsibility for other tourism-related activities in Flåm, such as port facilities. NSB would still operate the trains, and Flåm Utvikling would pay NSB the cost of running the trains, but keep the profits from the ticket sales. The Norwegian National Rail Administration, which had been established in 1996 and had taken over the responsibility for infrastructure, retained ownership of the line itself. Flåm Utvikling also started building a cruise ship terminal at Flåm, so tourists could walk ashore and directly to the trains.

With the change of ownership, NSB also decided to replace the aging El 11 with El 17. The locomotives had been delivered in 1987 and were intended for express train service, but had been plagued with technical problems and were not considered reliable enough to operate as single locomotives. The six newest trains of the class were painted in a new green livery and branded as Flåmsbana rather than NSB. Older B3 carriages were renovated, given new panorama windows and painted in the same color scheme and taken into use on the line. In October 2000, NSB sold its shares in Flåm Utvikling to Aurland Ressursutvikling. The line received GSM-R from 1 May 2005. The same year, Nærøyfjord, the neighboring fjord to where Flåm is located, was inscribed as a World Heritage Site.

== Service ==
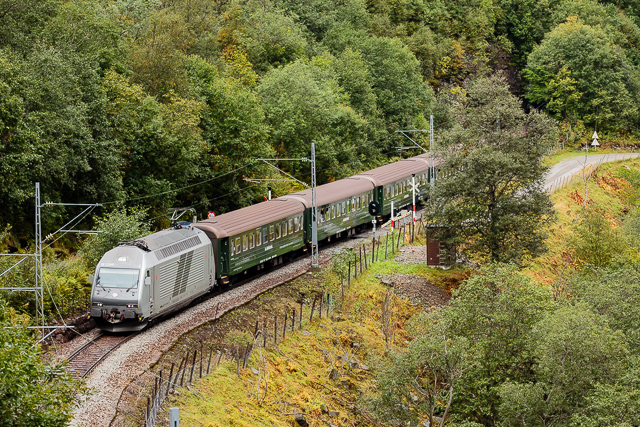
Flåm Line train led by an El 18 locomotive

The line is solely served by a tourist-oriented service operated by Vy on behalf of Flåm Utvikling. From May through September, there are nine or ten departures in each direction per day. In the rest of the year, there are four. Fares do not follow the normal fares for Vy and are considerably higher than on other train routes. InterRail tickets are not valid for free travel, but give a 30 percent discount. Travel time varies between 50 and 59 minutes between the end stations. In 2007, the line was the third-most visited tourist attraction in Norway and carried 547,000 passengers in 2010. Between 1998 and 2015, the service was provided by push–pull trains consisting of an El 17 at each end and with B3 carriages. The locomotives were built by Henschel in 1987, with electrical equipment from NEBB. They have a power output of 3,000 kilowatts (4,000 hp) and a Bo'Bo' wheel arrangement. Starting in 2014, El 18 replaced the El 17.
