= Rjoandefossen =

Waterfall in Vestland, Norway

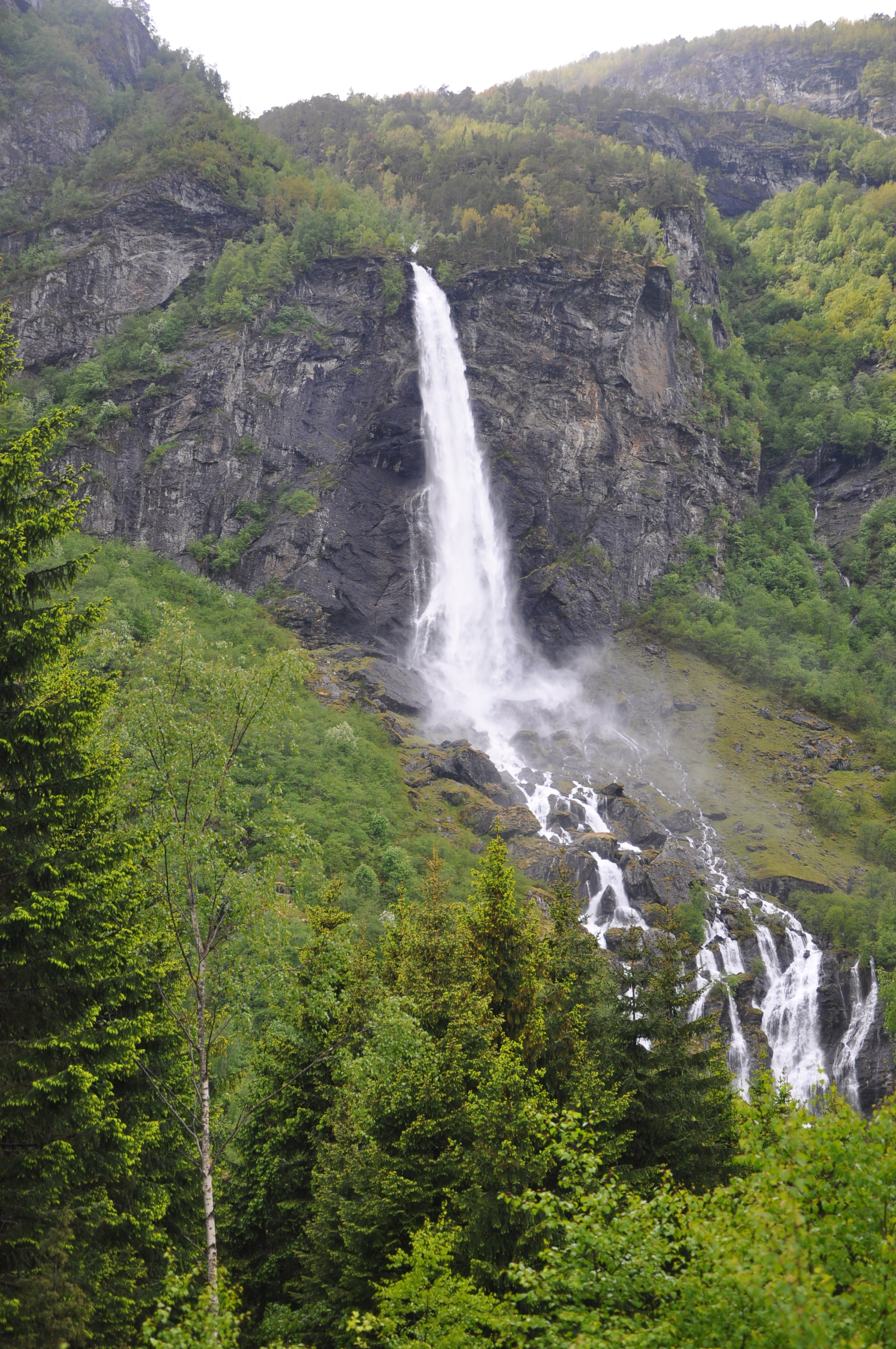
- Interactive map of Rjoandefossen
- Location: Vestland, Norway
- Coordinates: 60°49′35″N 7°6′27″E
- Type: Tiered plunges
- Total height: 241 metres (791 ft)
- Number of drops: 3
- Longest drop: 140 metres (460 ft)
- Total width: 30 metres (98 ft)
- Average width: 15 metres (49 ft)
- Run: 204 metres (669 ft)
- Watercourse: Rjoande
- Average flow rate: 1 to 3 m^{3}/s (35 to 106 cu ft/s)

Rjoandefossen is a waterfall in Aurland Municipality in Vestland county, Norway. It is located about 3 kilometres (1.9 mi) south of the village of Flåm. The waterfall is 241 metres (791 ft) tall and has three vertical falls, of which the tallest is about 140 metres (460 ft). The waterfall is an average of 15 metres (49 ft) with an average water flow of 1 to 3 cubic metres per second (35 to 106 cu ft/s). The waterfall is visible from the Flåm Line railway.

== See also ==
- List of waterfalls
