= Kjosfossen =

Waterfall in Vestland, Norway

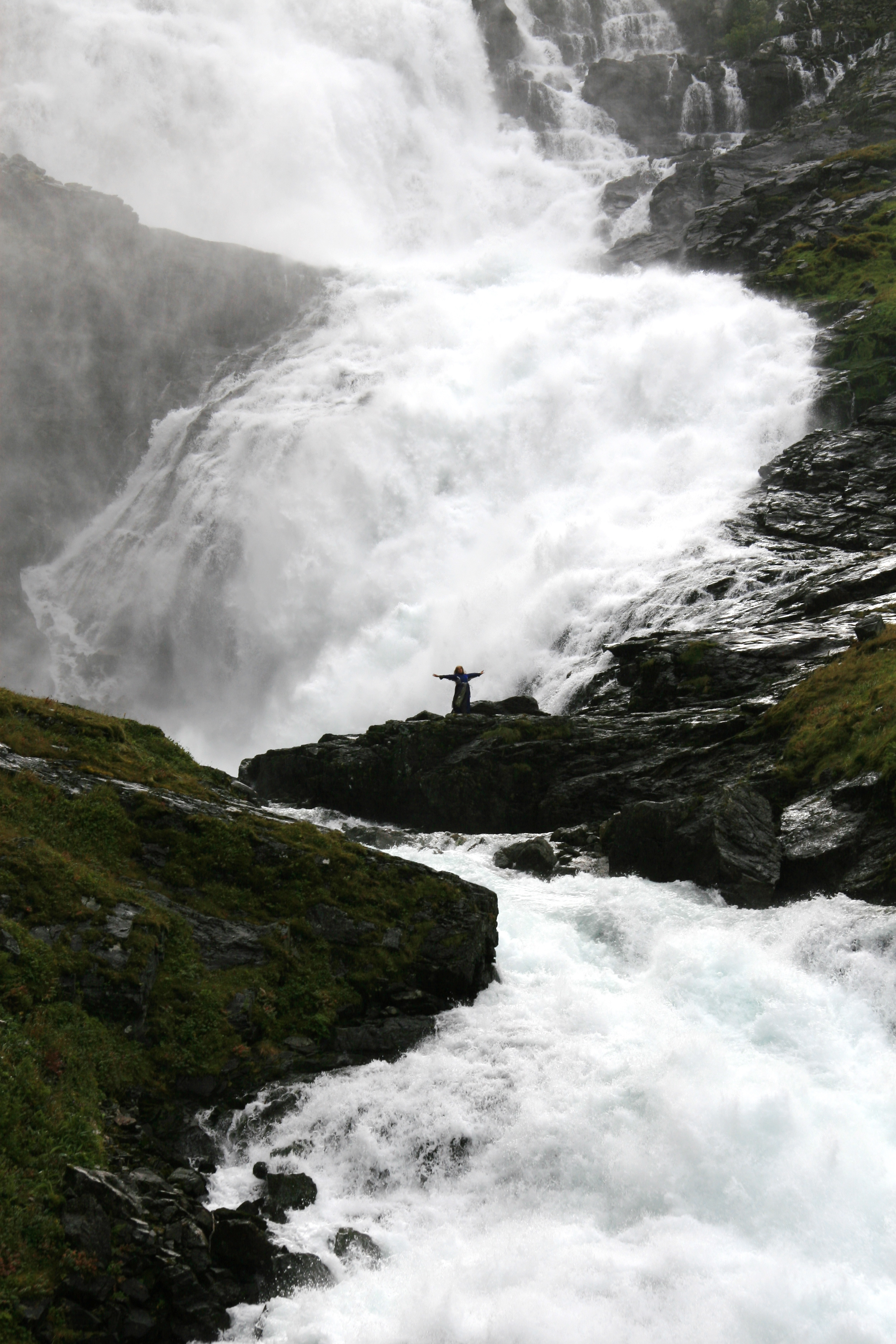
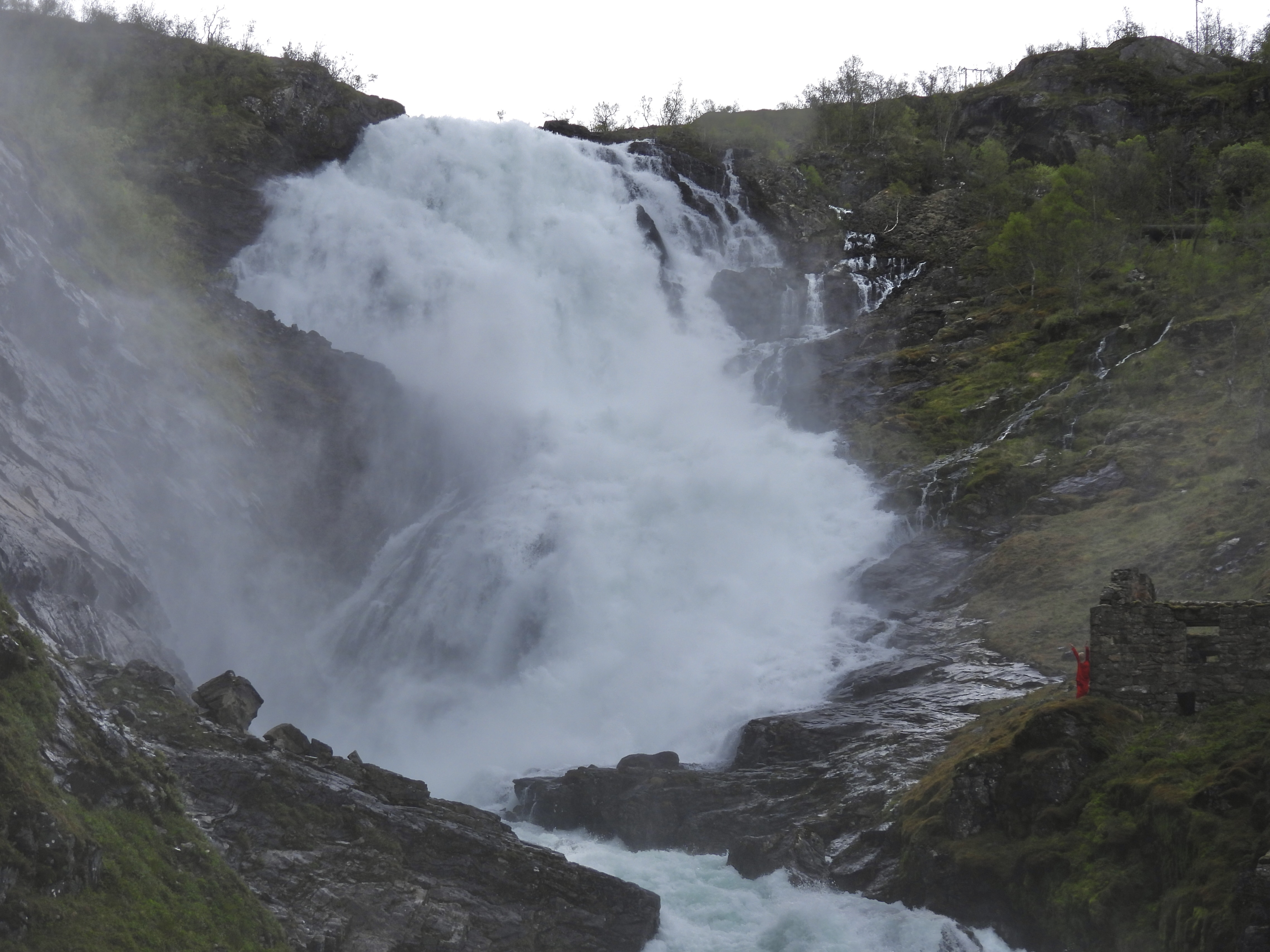
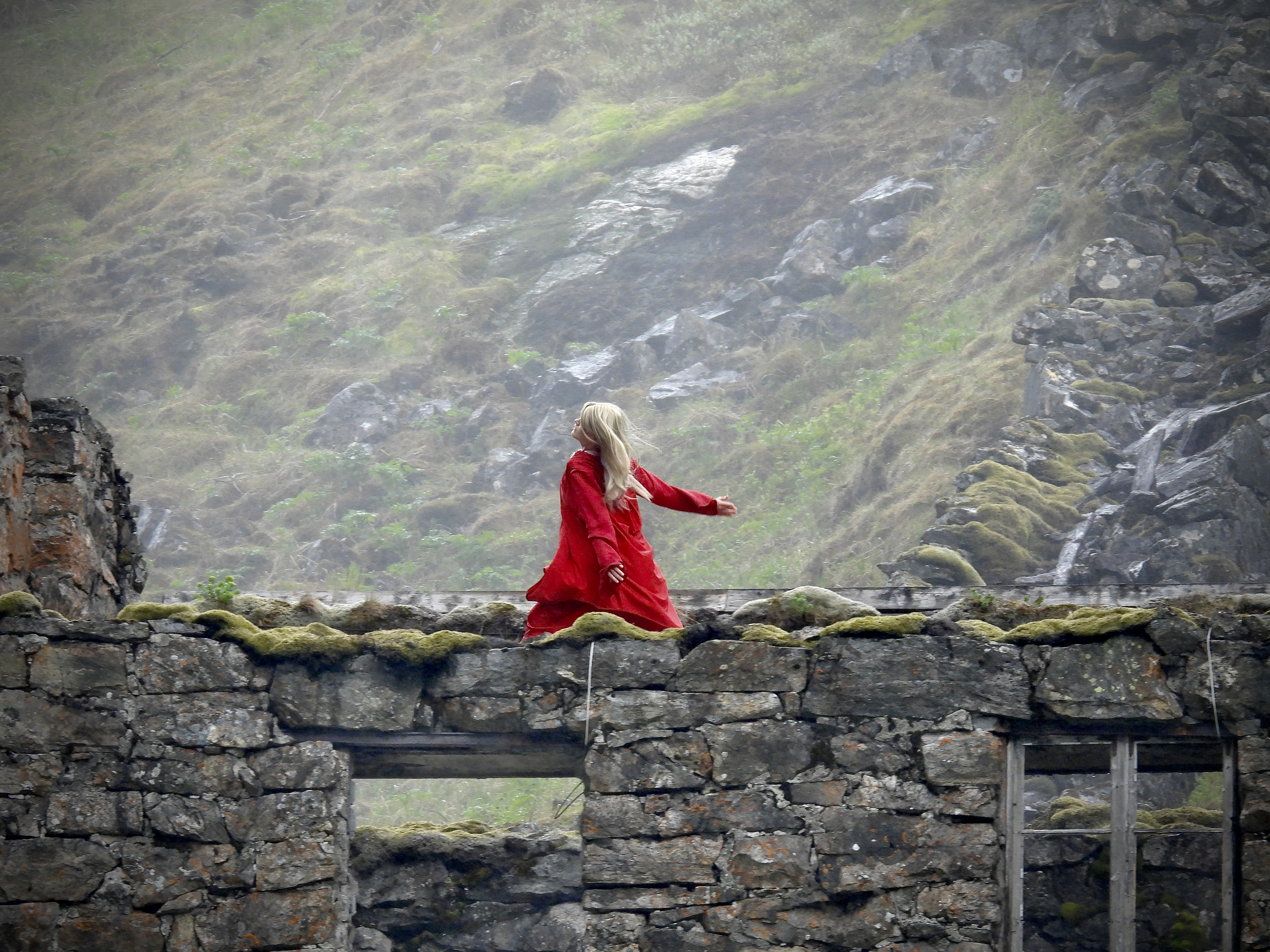
- A woman bunad dancing in front of Kjosfossen waterfall The Kjosfossen Waterfall crashes down 738' as a huldra dancer in red performs a seductive dance. A huldra dancer performs beside the Kjosfossen Waterfall.
- Interactive map of Kjosfossen
- Location: Vestland, Norway
- Coordinates: 60°44′48″N 07°08′09″E
- Type: Cascade
- Total height: 225 metres (738 ft)

Kjosfossen is a waterfall located in Aurland Municipality in Vestland county, Norway. The waterfall is one of the most visited tourist attractions in Norway. Its total fall is around 225 metres (738 ft). There is a small power station on the waterfall which is used to power the Flåm Line railway.

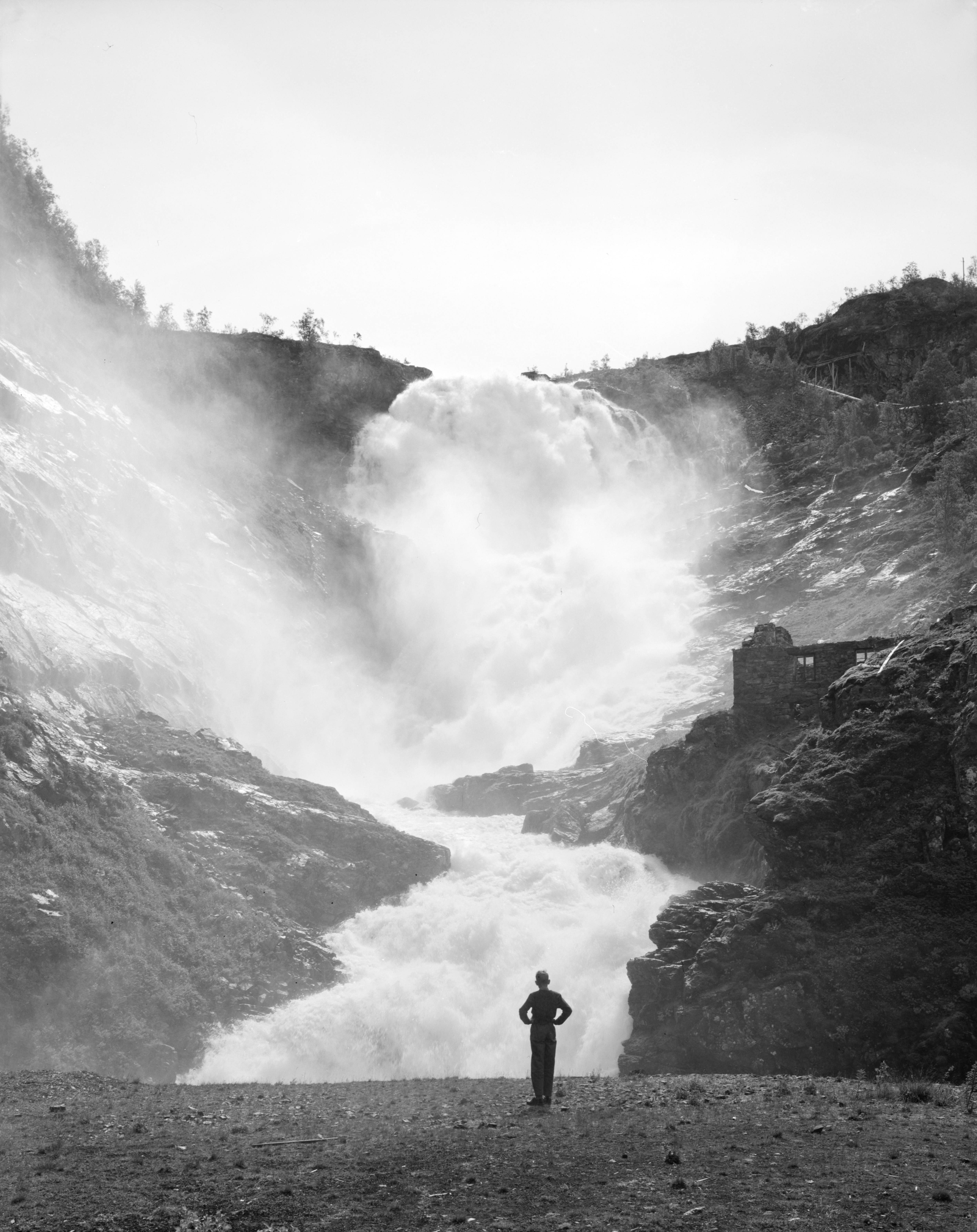
Kjosfossen in 1962.

The Flåm Line passes directly in front of and over the upper part of the waterfall (the falls continue much longer down to the right (east) of the Flåm Line as you head down into the gorge), which is one of the main attractions for tourists who take the Flåm Line. (Some of the Flam tourist maps are orientated with South at the top.)

The waterfall is located about 1.5 kilometres (0.93 mi) northeast of Myrdal Station. During the main tourist season in the summer an actress dressed as a legendary Huldra (a seductive forest creature in Scandinavian folklore) dances and sings in front of the waterfall as the trains enter the station for the amusement of the tourists. The Huldra actresses are all students from the Norwegian ballet school.

The waterfall gets as much as 900,000 visitors yearly, and is considered to be among Norway's most visited natural tourist attractions.

== See also ==
- List of waterfalls
