= Myrdal Station =

Train station in Vestland, Norway

Myrdal Station Myrdal stasjon
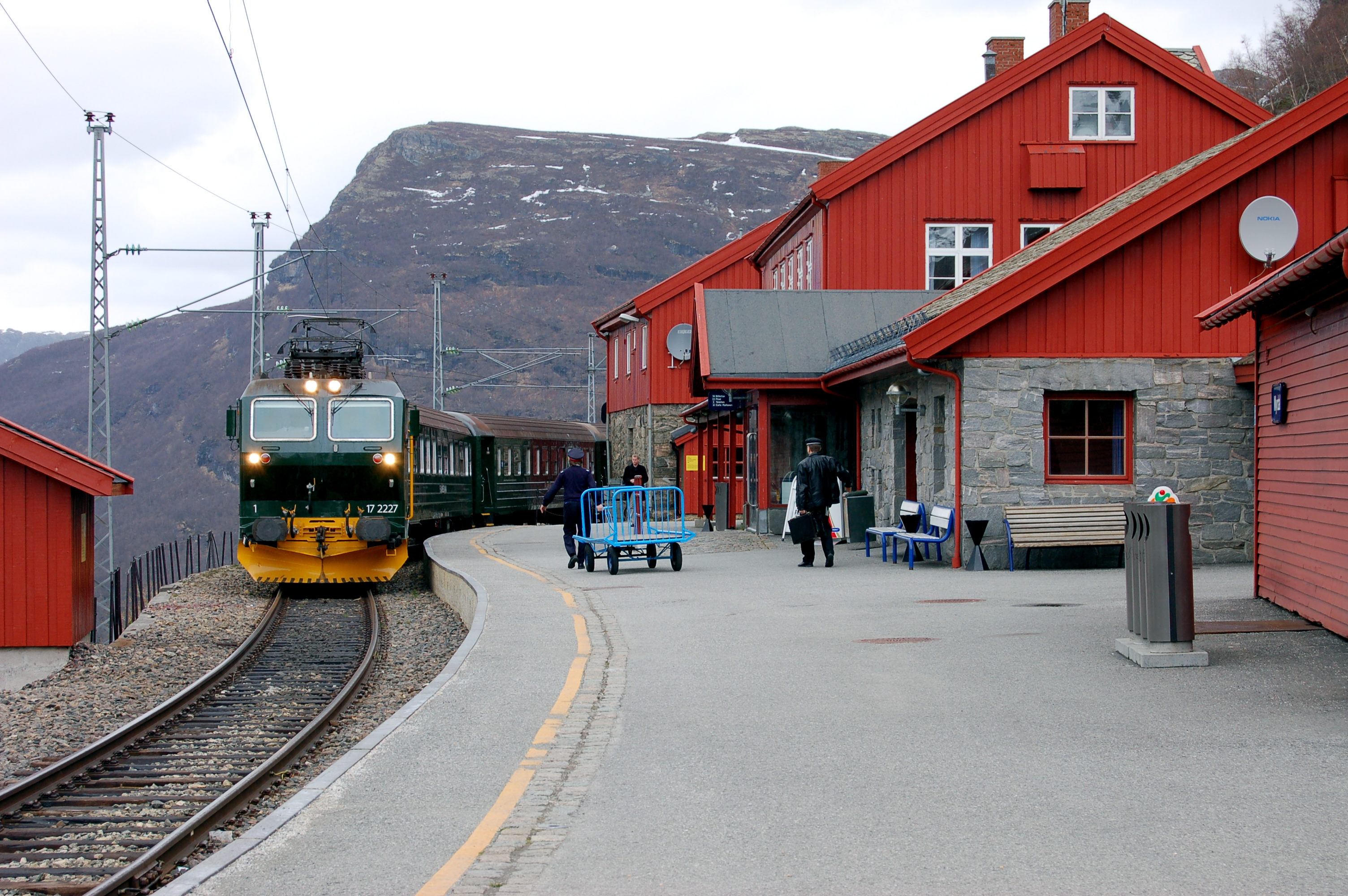
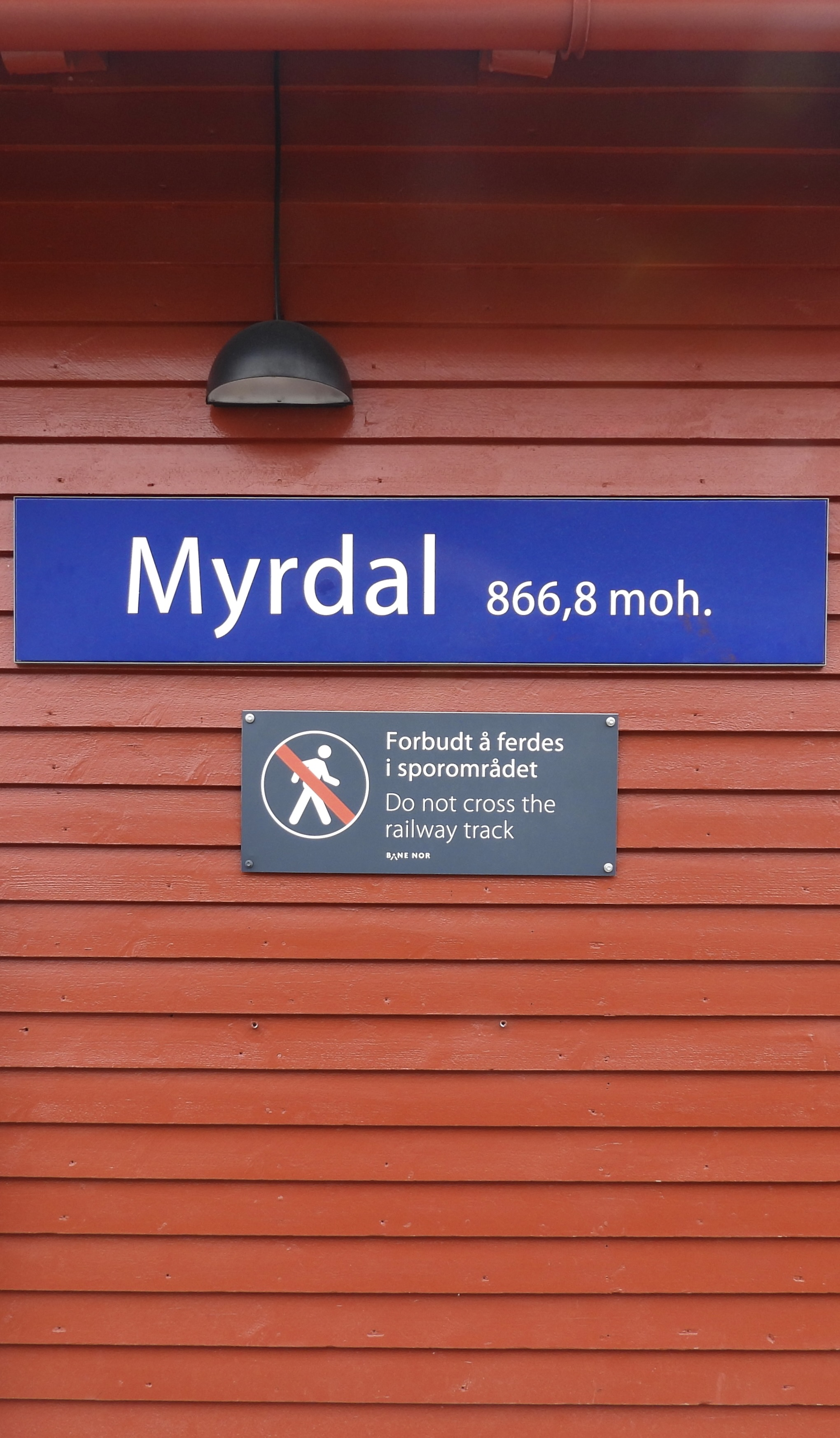
- A Flåm Line train at Myrdal Station The Myrdal Station sign. (866.8 moh.)

General information
- Location: Myrdal, Aurland Municipality; Norway
- Coordinates: 60.73528°N 7.1228°E
- Elevation: 866.8 m (2,844 ft)
- System: Railway station
- Owner: Bane NOR
- Operator: Flåm Utvikling (Vy); Vy Tog
- Lines: Bergensbanen; Flåmsbanen
- Distance: 335.80 km (208.66 mi)
- Platforms: 3

Other information
- Station code: MYR

History
- Opened: 1908; 118 years ago
Location

Myrdal Station (Norwegian: Myrdal stasjon) is a mountain railway station and junction, located in Aurland Municipality in Vestland county, Norway. It serves as an important railway station, connecting the Bergen Line to the Flåm Line local railway. The Bergen Line connects Norway's two largest cities: Oslo and Bergen. Myrdal Station is the upper terminal of the Flåm Line local railway, which ascends from the valley floor of the Sognefjord to the mountain-top junction, providing a vital public transport link, but deriving a majority of its passengers through tourism. Most passengers using Myrdal station are changing trains between the two lines.

== Location ==
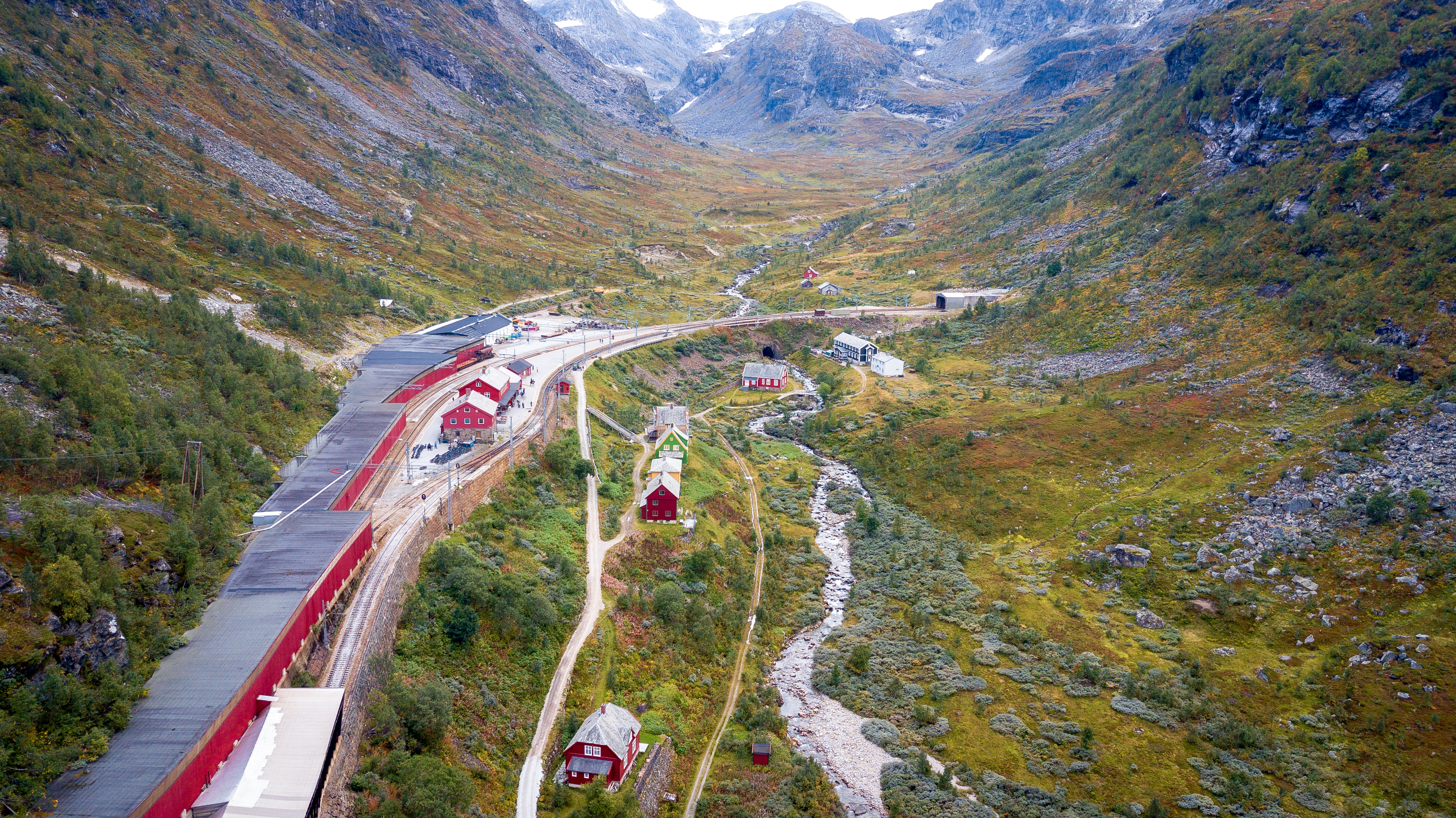
Aerial photo of Myrdal

Myrdal station is located about 13 kilometres (8.1 mi) south of the village of Flåm and about 20 kilometres (12 mi) south of Aurlandsvangen. There is no road connection to Myrdal although there are some cottages and hotels in the area, served by Myrdal Station, and the nearby Vatnahalsen Station, about 1 kilometre (0.62 mi) before Myrdal, and 50 metres (160 ft) lower in elevation.

The station is located between two tunnels on the Bergen Line: the Gravahals Tunnel to the west and the Vatnahalsen Tunnel to the east. Completion of the 5.3 kilometres (3.3 mi) long Gravahals Tunnel was done in 1905. The station is located at an elevation of 867 metres (2,844 ft) above mean sea level.

== Facilities ==
The station has three platforms. Platform 1 is the principal platform on the mainline, and platform 2 is the alternative mainline platform located on the passing loop. The non-consecutively numbered platform 11 is the platform used by local trains to and from Flåm. As the mainline is single track, the passing loop allows regional trains to cross with freight services, and occasionally with other passenger trains. A large cafeteria and gift shop provides refreshment and shelter, and there are waiting rooms and lavatories. There are freight sidings located at Myrdal.

== History ==
The station opened in 1908. On 17 January 1923, the station restaurant was taken over by Norsk Spisevognselskap. As the facilities were too small, the restaurant was later moved to another, larger building.

Preceding station			Following station
Upsete	Bergen Line		Hallingskeid
Terminus	Flåm Line		Vatnahalsen
Preceding station	Express trains		Following station
Voss	F4	Bergen–Oslo S	Hallingskeid
Preceding station	Local trains		Following station
Upsete		Bergen Commuter Rail	Terminus
