= Flåm Utvikling =

Railway company

Flåm Utvikling AS
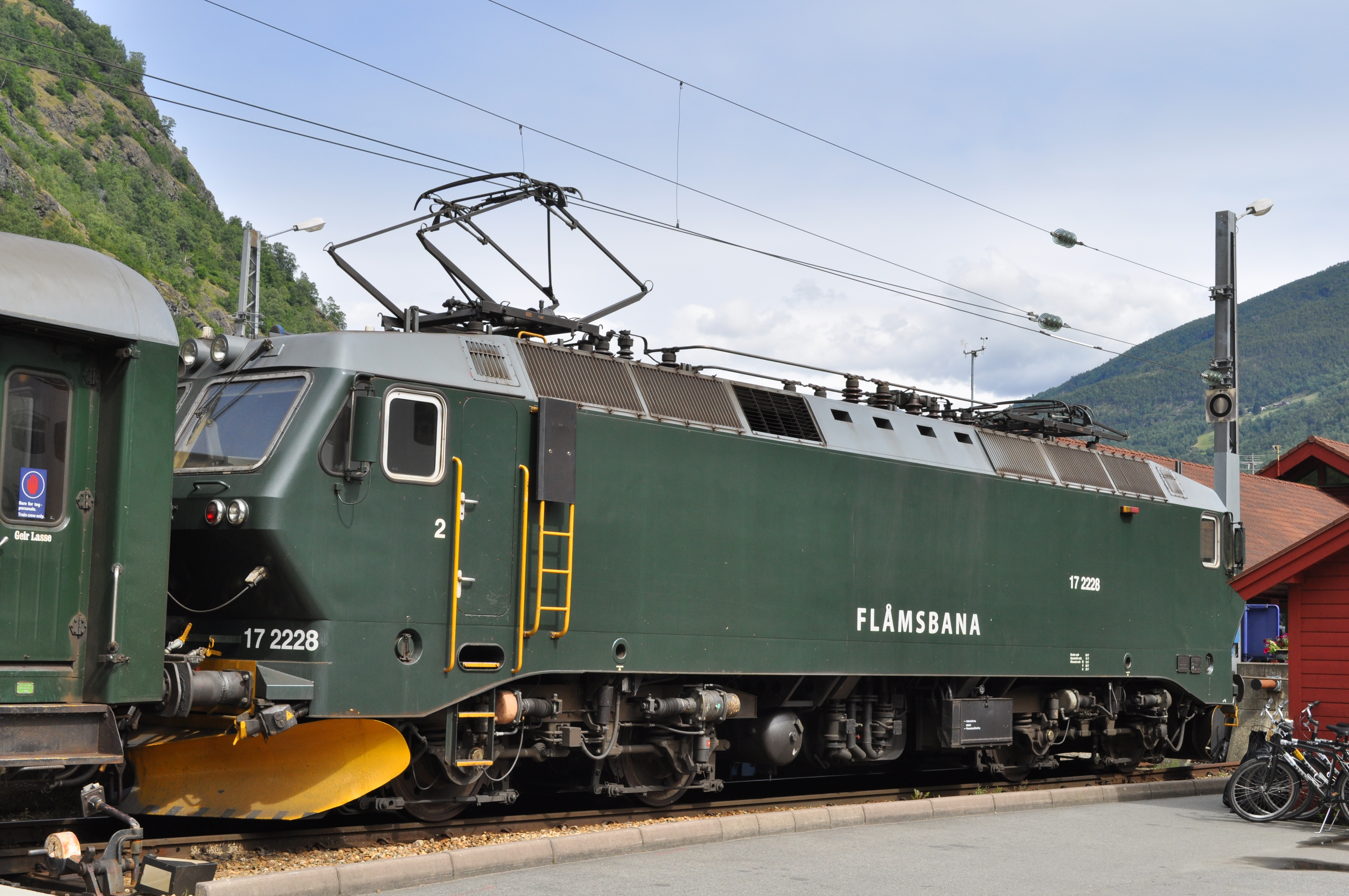
- Type: Private
- Industry: Transport
- Founded: 1998
- Headquarters: Flåm, Vestland, Norway
- Area served: Norway
- Products: Flåmsbana
- Number of employees: 13 (2024)
- Parent: Vygruppen AS (Vy) (50 %) Norways best Group AS (NBG) (50)
- Website: www.flaamsbana.no

Flåm Utvikling is the company that manages the Flåm Line railway (Norwegian: Flåmsbana) which is located in Aurland Municipality in Vestland county, Norway.

Flåm Utvikling AS is a tourism company whose aim is to strengthen and further develop the tourism industry in the village of Flåm in Aurland Municipality. The company is a subsidiary of Aurland Ressursutvikling and was founded in 1997. Starting on 1 January 1998, Flåm Utvikling took over operational, product development, and marketing responsibility for the Flåmsbana railway. However, Vy is still operationally responsible for the train management itself, and the Norwegian Railways is responsible for the track and signaling system.

== History ==
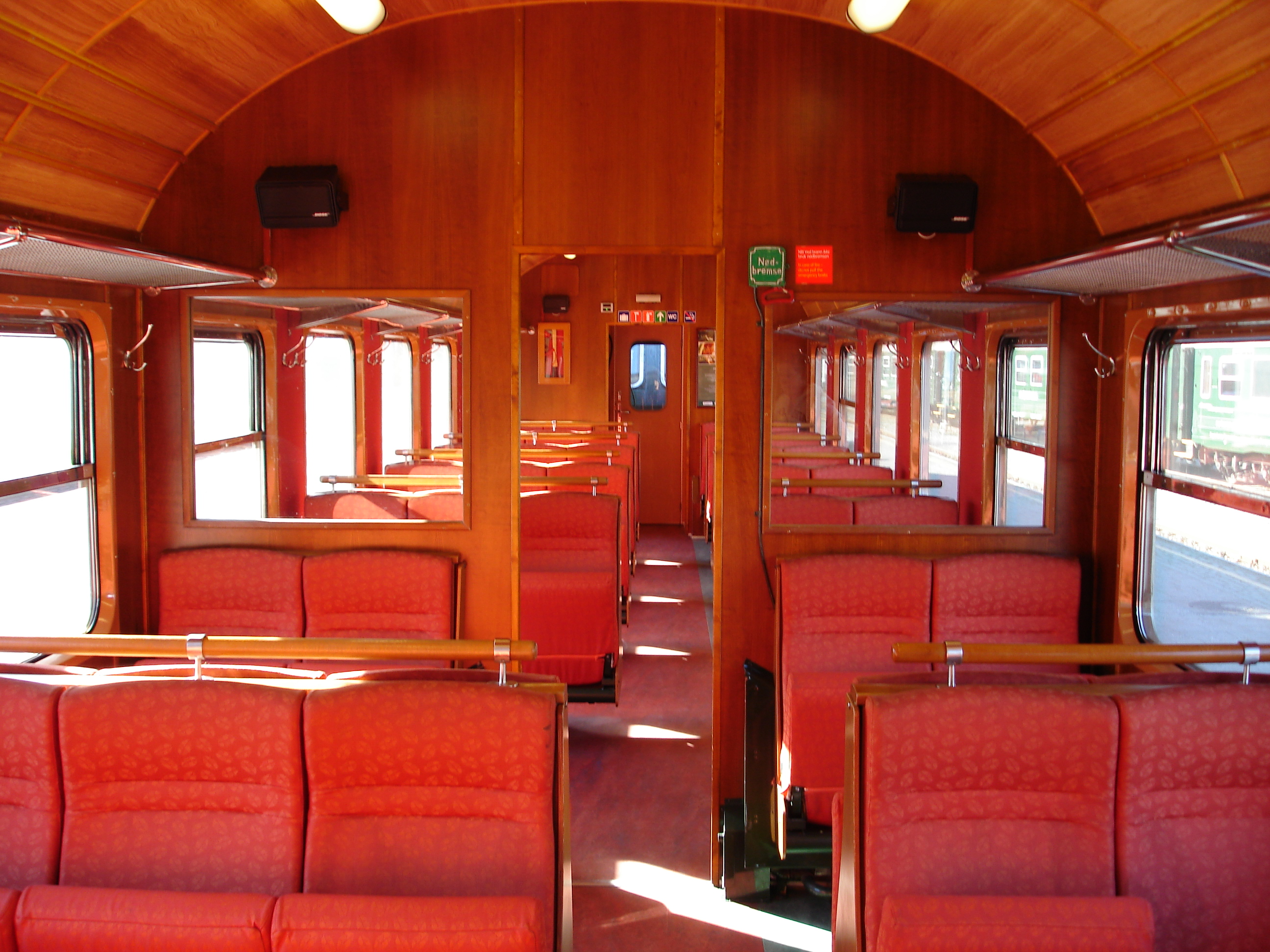
Passenger compartment on Flåm Line

Up until 1998 it was Norges Statsbaner who operated the line, but then Flåm Utvikling took over the role, though NSB still actually operates the trains with the railway line itself is owned by Jernbaneverket.

The company operates five El 17 Locomotives, and has two trains with a locomotive at each end of six B3 passenger cars on the 20 km long Flåmsbana. The rolling stock is painted green. The El 17 replaced the aging El 11 in 1998.
