= Flåmselvi =

River in Vestland, Norway

Flåmselvi Moldo
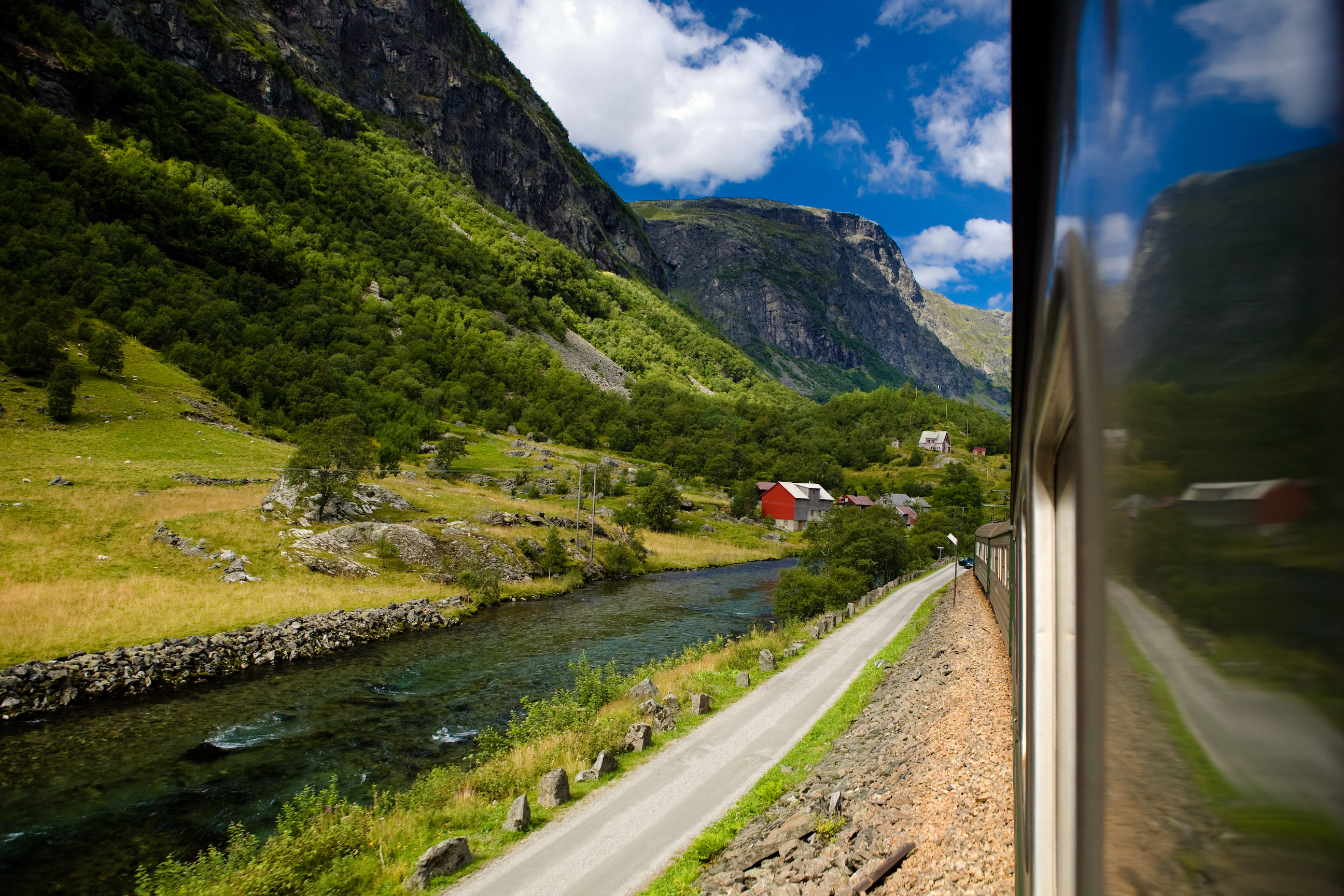
- The river as seen from the Flåm Line railway

Location
- Country: Norway
- County: Vestland
- Municipalities: Aurland, Ulvik

Physical characteristics
- Source: Omnsbreen glacier
  - location: Finse, Ulvik Municipality, Norway
  - coordinates: 60.63077°N 7.48443°E
  - elevation: 1,532 metres (5,026 ft)
- Mouth: Aurlandsfjorden
  - location: Flåm, Aurland Municipality, Norway
  - coordinates: 60.86501°N 7.11963°E
  - elevation: 0 metres (0 ft)
- Length: 40 km (25 mi)

Flåmselvi or Moldo is a 40-kilometre (25 mi) long river in Vestland county, Norway. The river begins as runoff from the Omnsbreen glacier about 5 kilometres (3.1 mi) northwest of Finse in Ulvik Municipality. The river is known as the Moldo river in this area. It then flows through a series of lakes heading to the northwest where it crosses into Aurland Municipality. The Bergen Line follows the river to Myrdal. At Myrdal, the river goes over the Kjosfossen waterfall and it follows Flåmsdalen valley and heads to the north. When it reaches the village of Flåm, it empties into Aurlandsfjorden, a branch off the main Sognefjorden (Norway's longest fjord).
