= Flåm Church =

Church in Vestland, Norway

- Flåm kyrkje
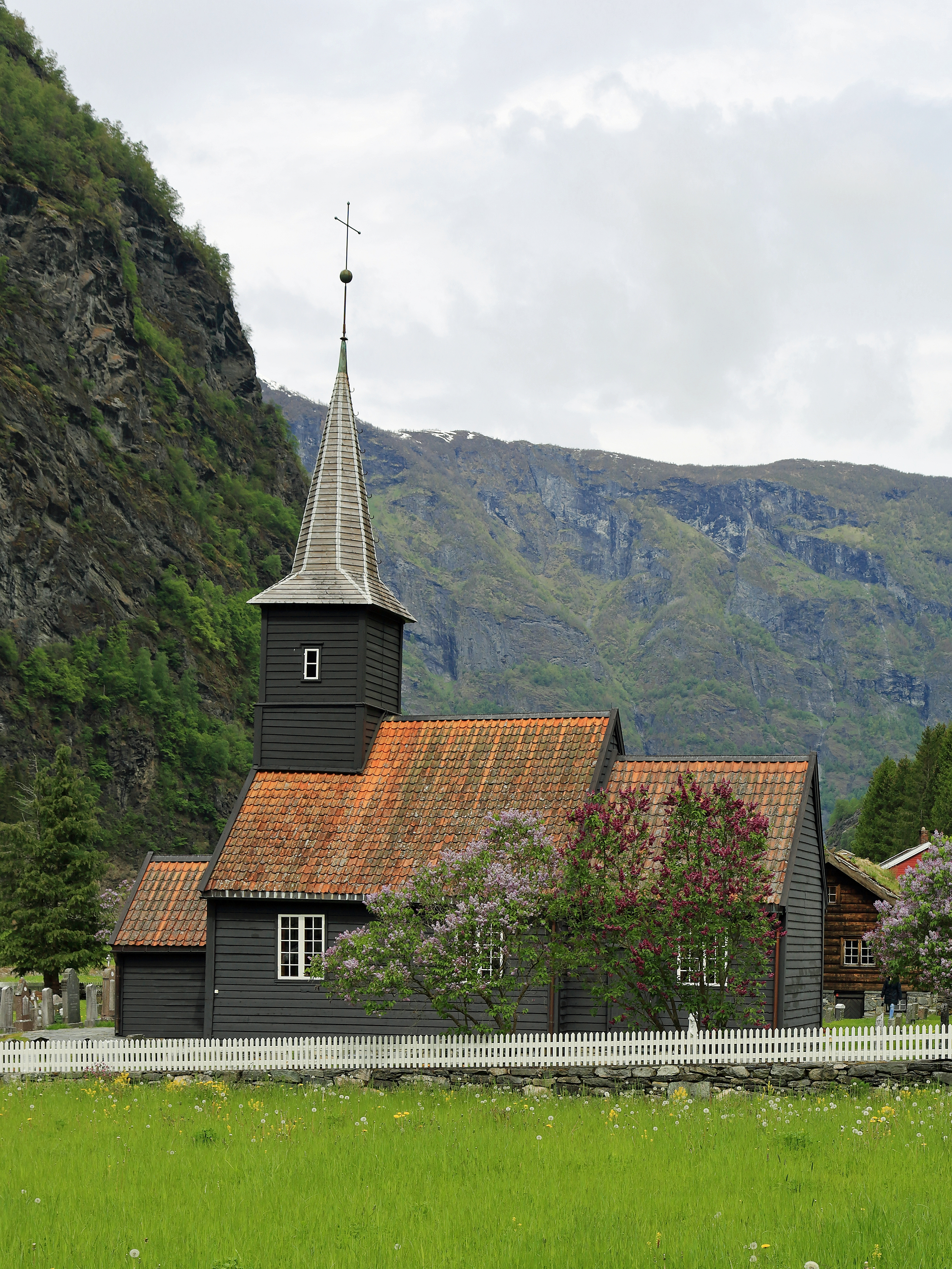
- View of the church
- Flåm Church
- 60°50′16″N 7°07′17″E
- Location: Flåm, Aurland Municipality, Vestland
- Country: Norway
- Denomination: Church of Norway
- Previous denomination: Catholic Church
- Churchmanship: Evangelical Lutheran

History
- Status: Parish church
- Founded: 13th century
- Consecrated: 1670

Architecture
- Functional status: Active
- Architectural type: Long church
- Completed: 1670 (356 years ago)

Specifications
- Capacity: 160
- Materials: Wood

Administration
- Diocese: Bjørgvin bispedømme
- Deanery: Sogn prosti
- Parish: Flåm
- Norwegian Cultural Heritage Site
- Type: Church
- Status: Automatically protected
- ID: 84171

Flåm Church (Norwegian: Flåm kyrkje) is a parish church of the Church of Norway in Aurland Municipality in Vestland county, Norway. It is located in the village of Flåm. It is the church for the Flåm parish which is part of the Sogn prosti (deanery) in the Diocese of Bjørgvin. The brown, wooden church was built in a long church design in 1670 by master builder Magne Essen using designs by an unknown architect. The church seats about 160 people.

== History ==
The earliest existing historical records of the church date back to the year 1340, but the church was not new that year. The first church in Flåm was likely a wooden stave church that was located on the same site as the present-day church. By 1661, the church was described as being in miserable condition. The parish hired master builder Magne Essen to tear down the old stave church and to build a new one on the same site, reusing as much of the old materials as possible. The builder, however, did not do that. He built a new church about 2 kilometres (1.2 mi) to the north in Fretheim, and he did not tear down the old church. Unfortunately, the new church was significantly damaged in a wind storm the following year in 1669. So then, in 1670, both churches (the medieval stave church and the new church) were torn down and the materials from the two churches were reused in the building of a new church on the site of the old stave church. The new church was a wooden long church with a rectangular nave that measured about 8.7 by 7.2 metres (29 ft × 24 ft) and a smaller, square chancel that measured about 5.4 by 5.4 metres (18 ft × 18 ft). There is a tower above the west end of the nave and then a small church porch on the west end of the building that measured about 3 by 3 metres (9.8 ft × 9.8 ft). In 1926, the tower and church porch were both rebuilt and the exterior siding was painted a dark brown.

== Media gallery ==
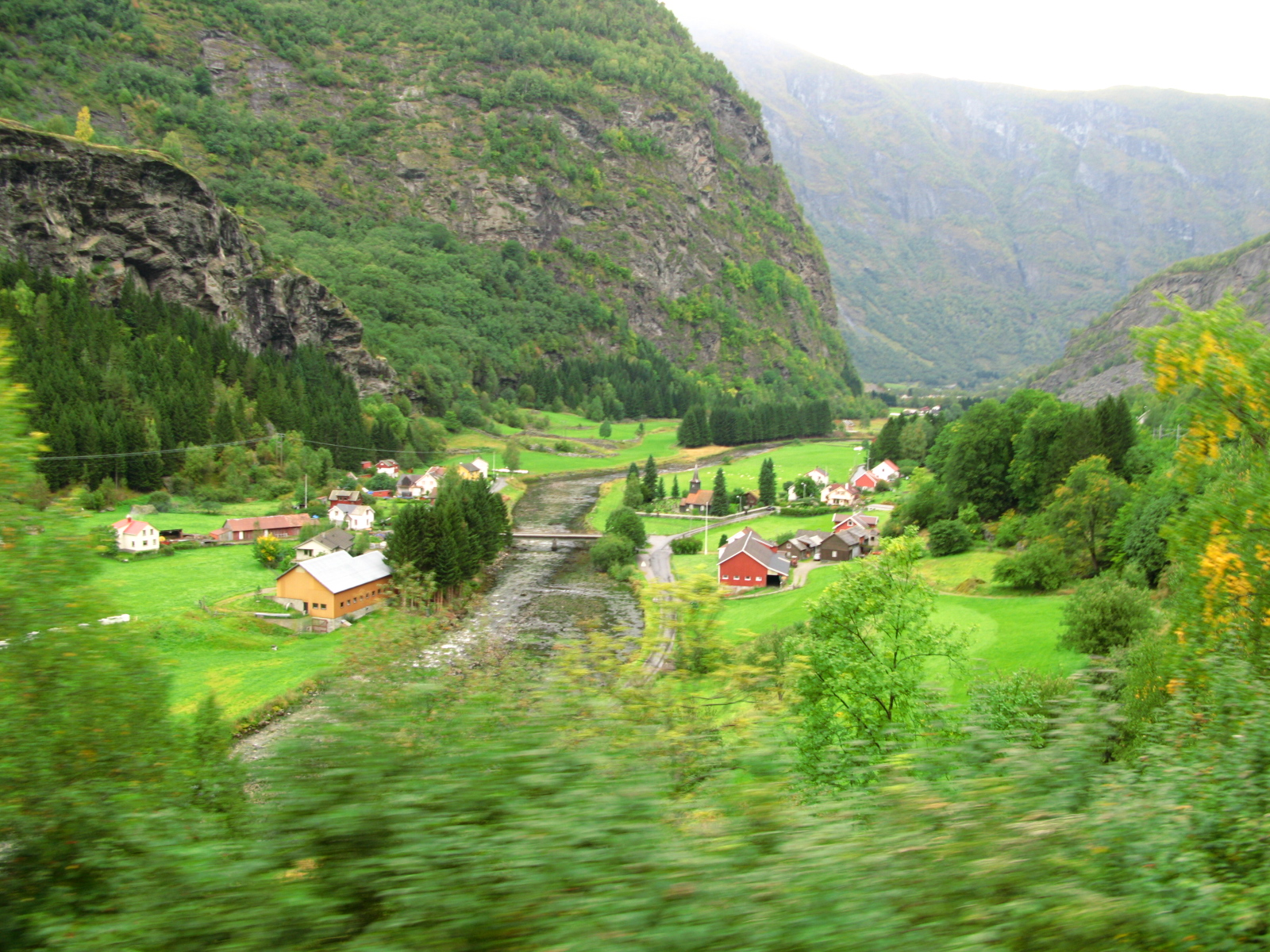
View of the church near the river in the Flåmsdalen valley

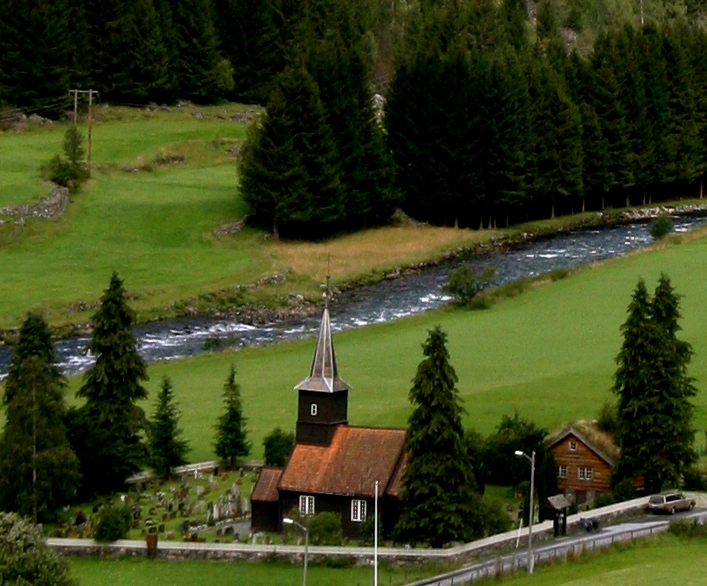
Another exterior view

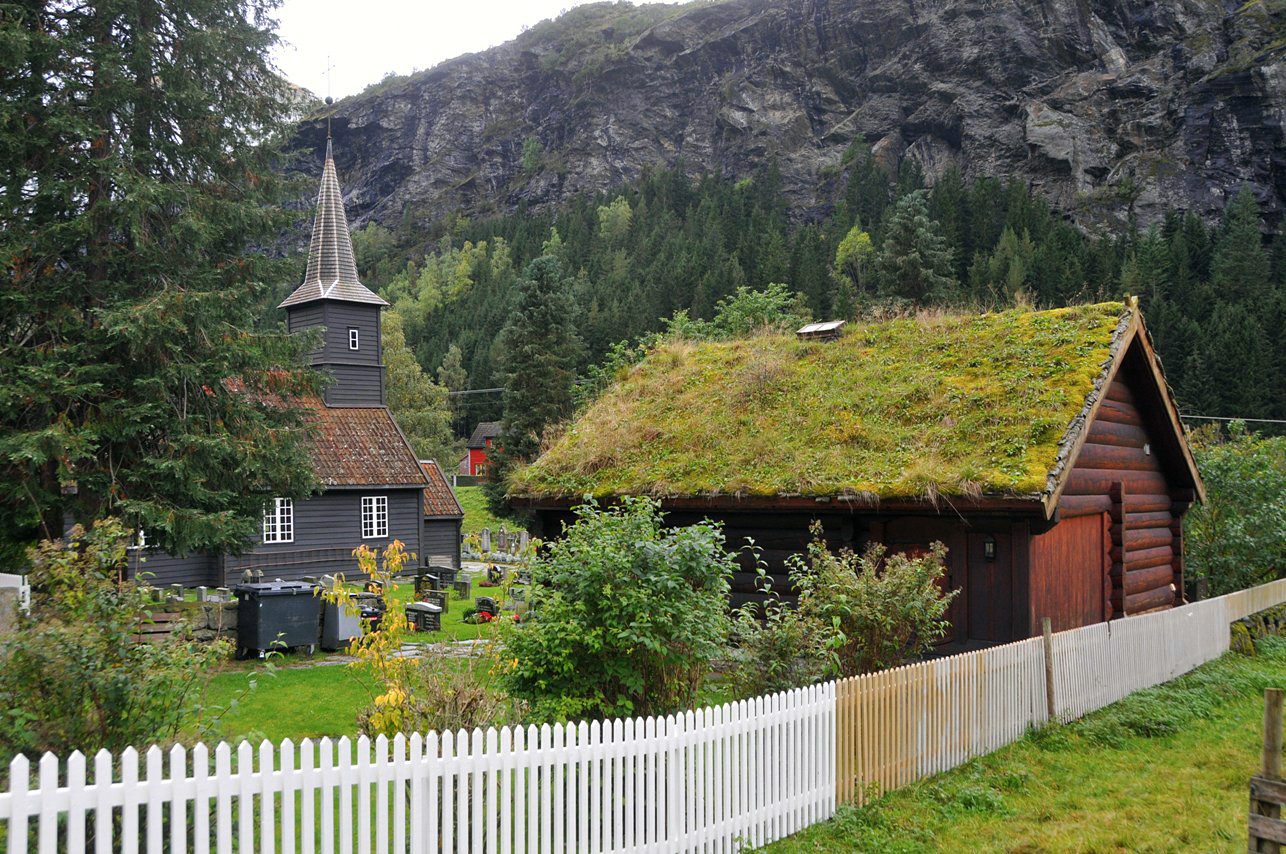
Exterior view, including an outside storage building

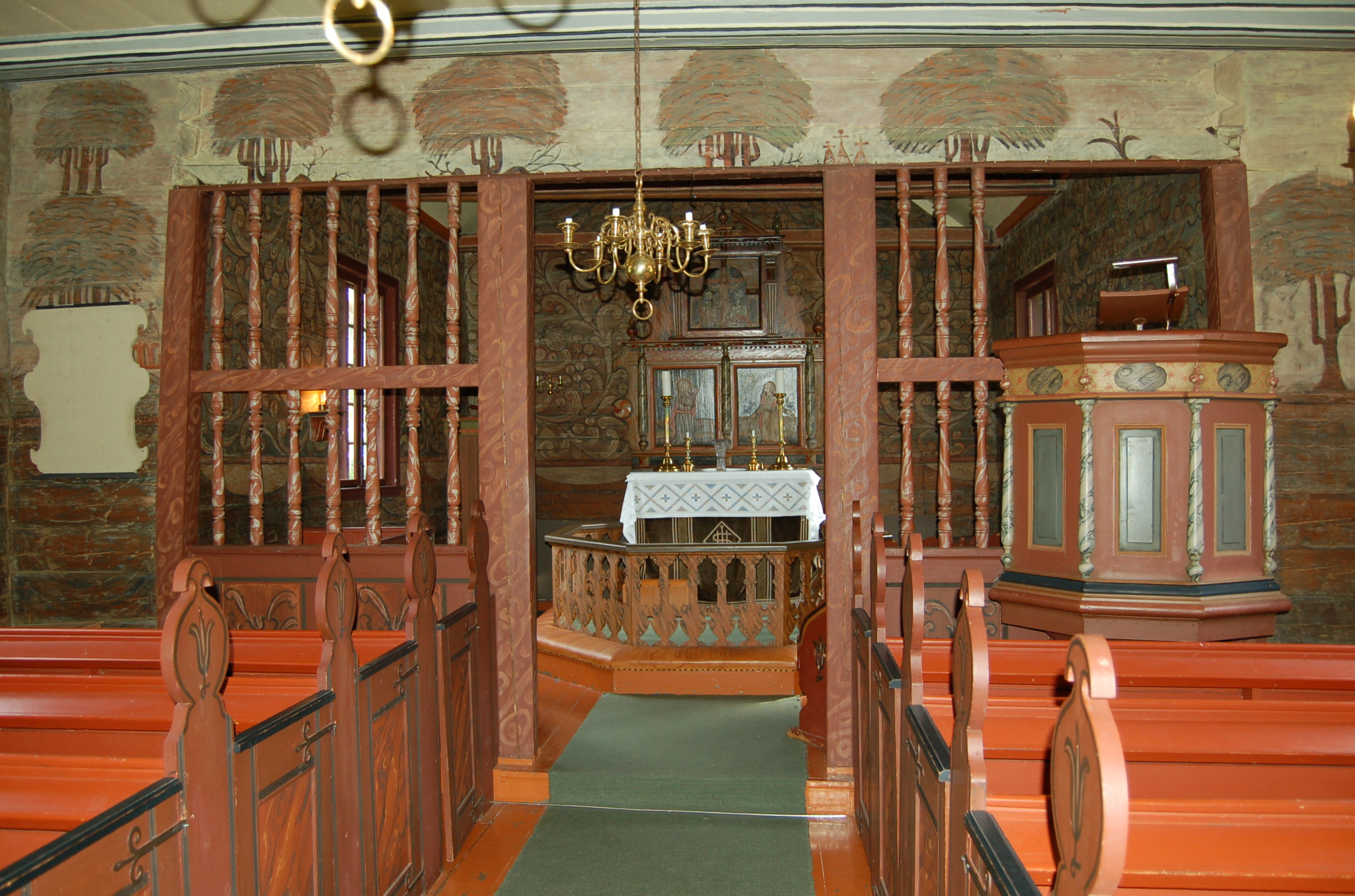
Interior view of the altar area

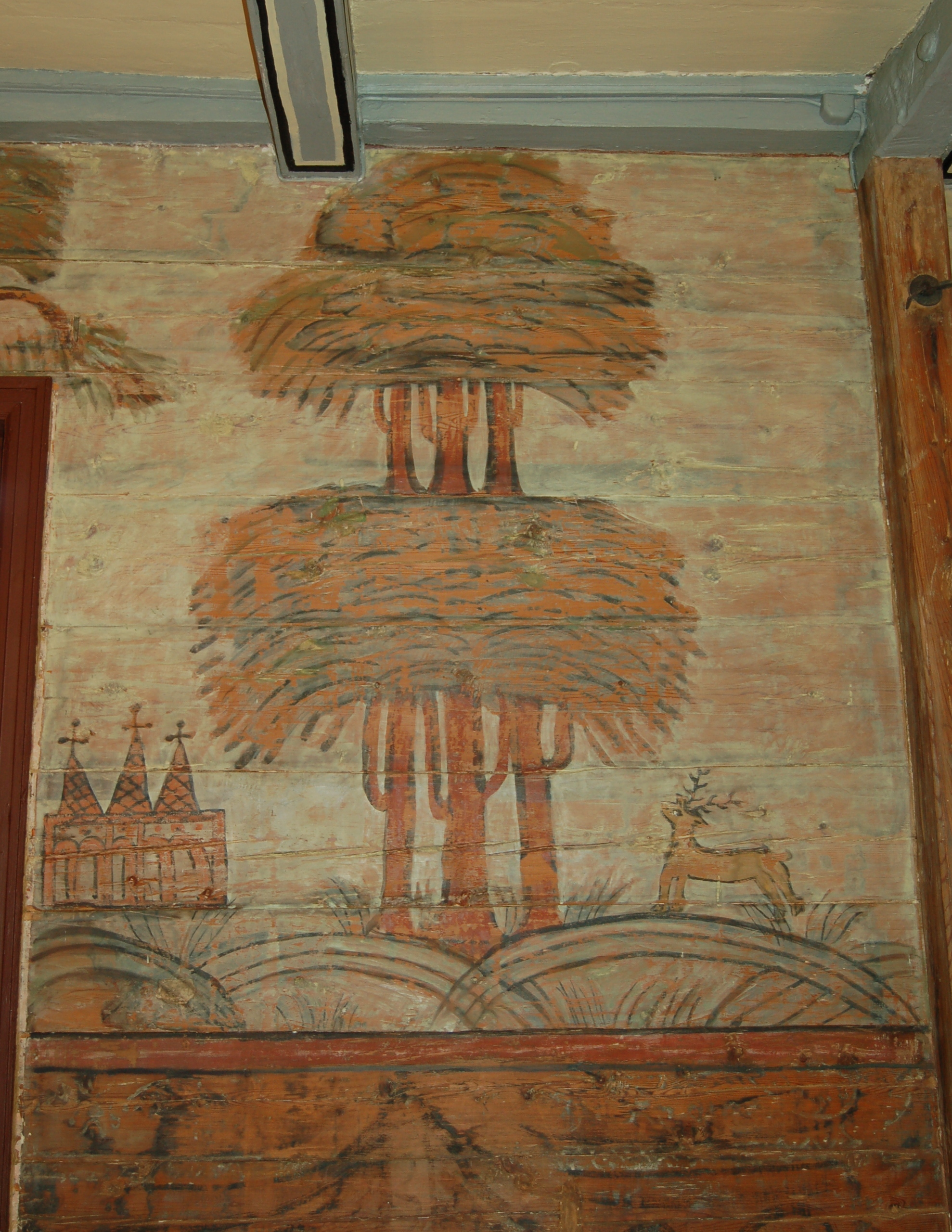
Close up of wall art

== See also ==
- List of churches in Bjørgvin
