= Flåmsdalen =

Valley in Aurland, Norway

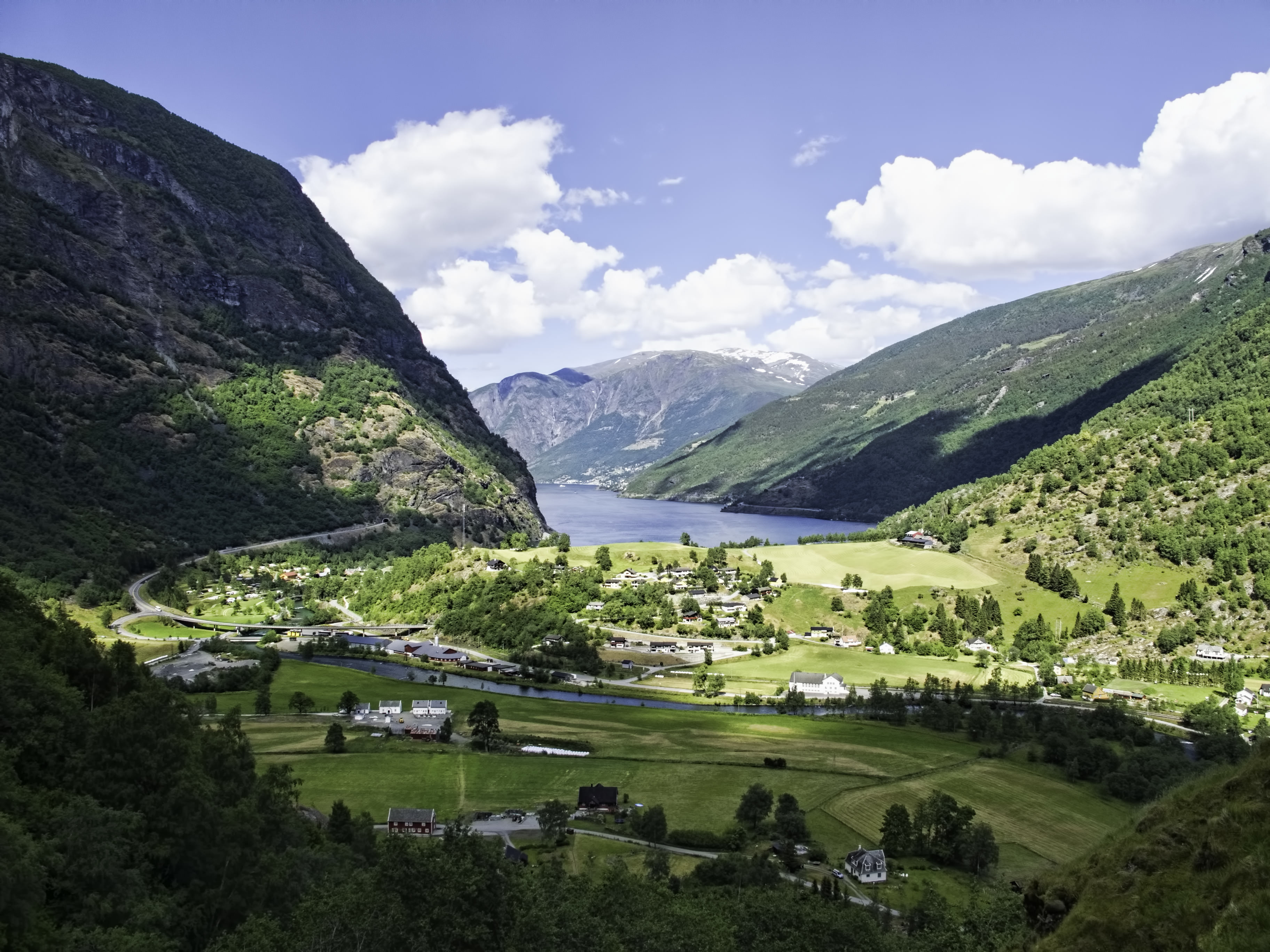
- View of the village of Flåm and the Aurlandsfjorden at the north end of the valley.
- Length: 18 kilometres (11 mi) N-S

Geology
- Type: River valley

Geography
- Location: Vestland, Norway
- Population centers: Flåm
- Coordinates: 60°47′59″N 7°6′39″E
- River: Flåmselvi
- Interactive map of Flåmsdalen

Flåmsdalen is a valley in Aurland Municipality in Vestland county, Norway. It is 18 kilometers (11 mi) long and runs from Myrdal to the village of Flåm, dropping 860 meters (2,820 ft) over the course of its run. The river Flåmselvi runs through the valley, as does the Flåm Line, a famous tourist destination.

== Media gallery ==
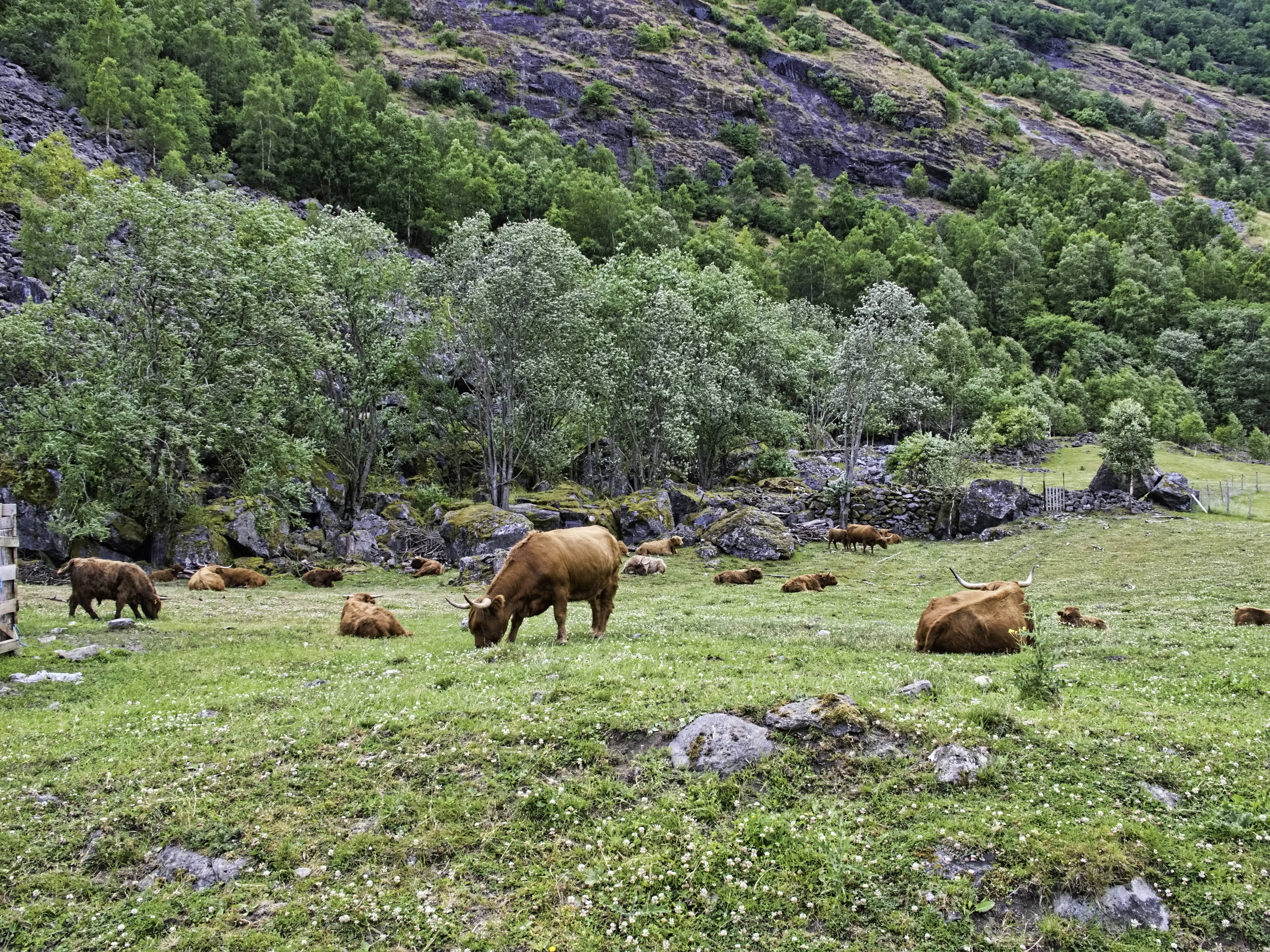

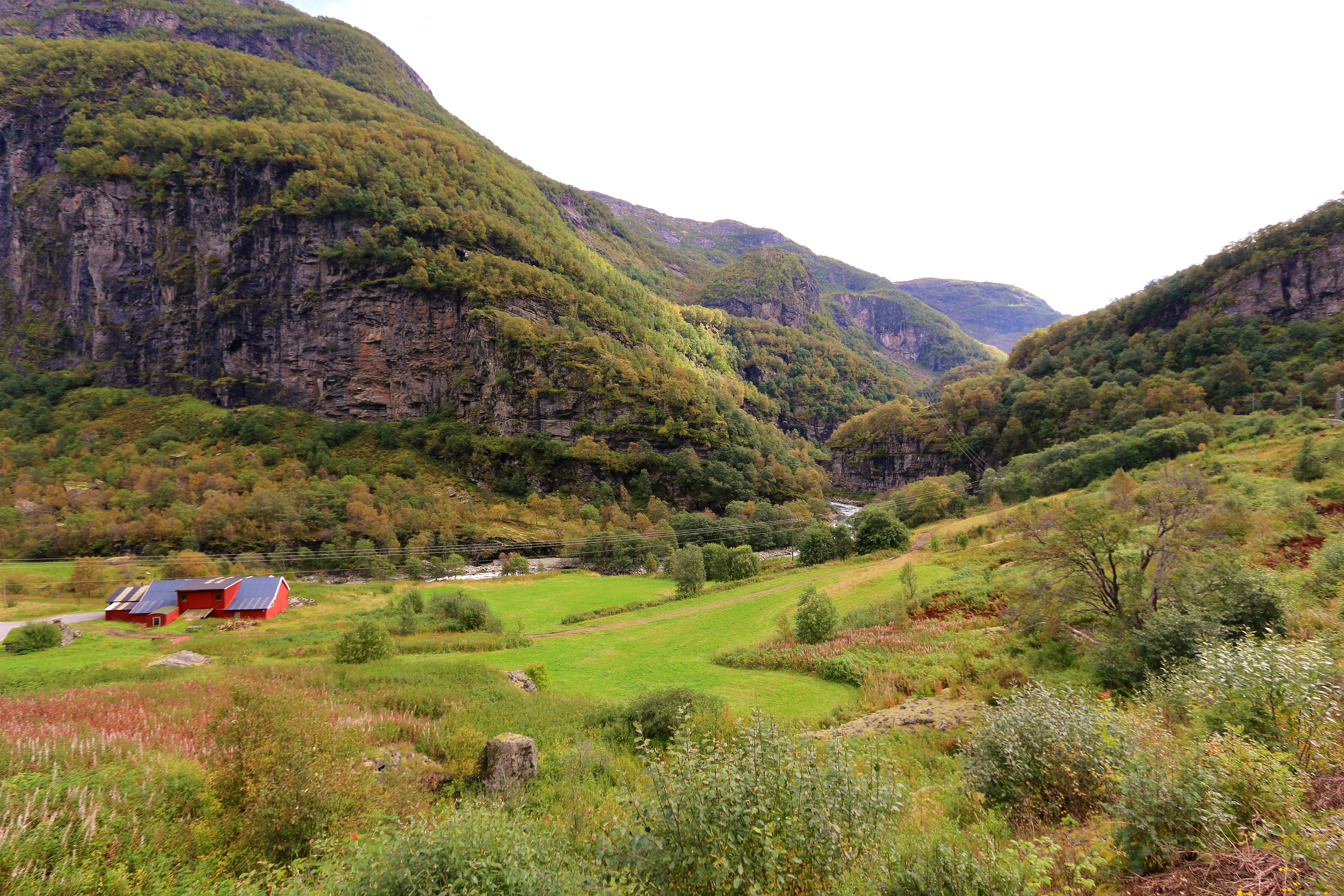

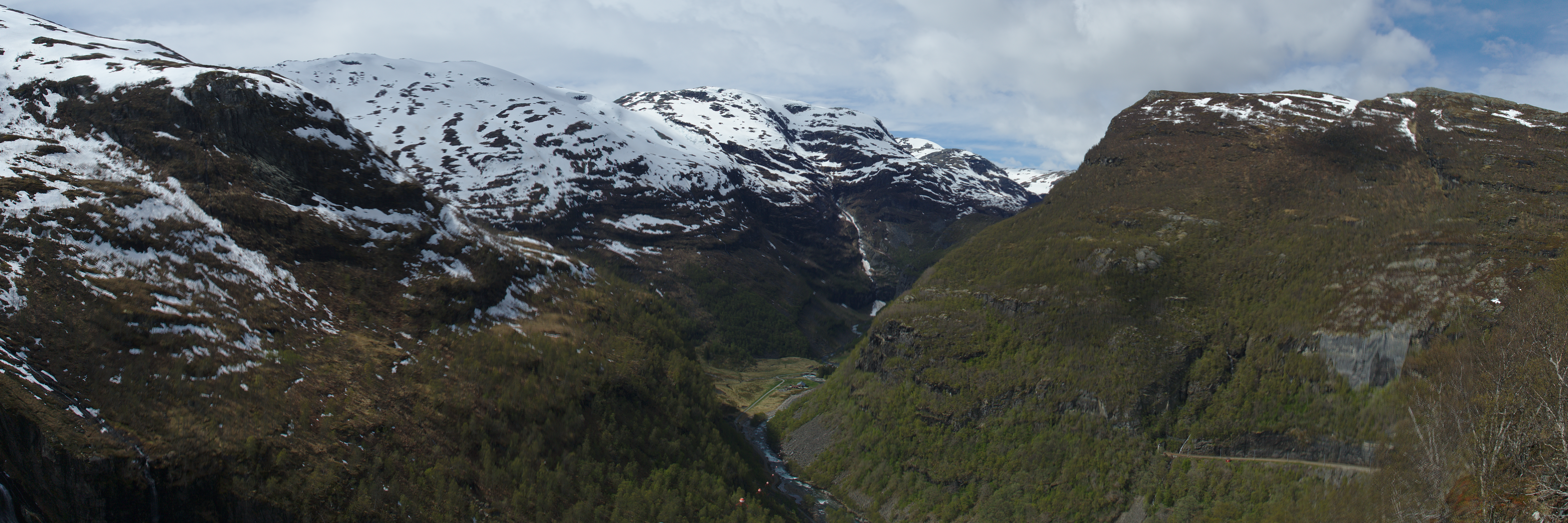

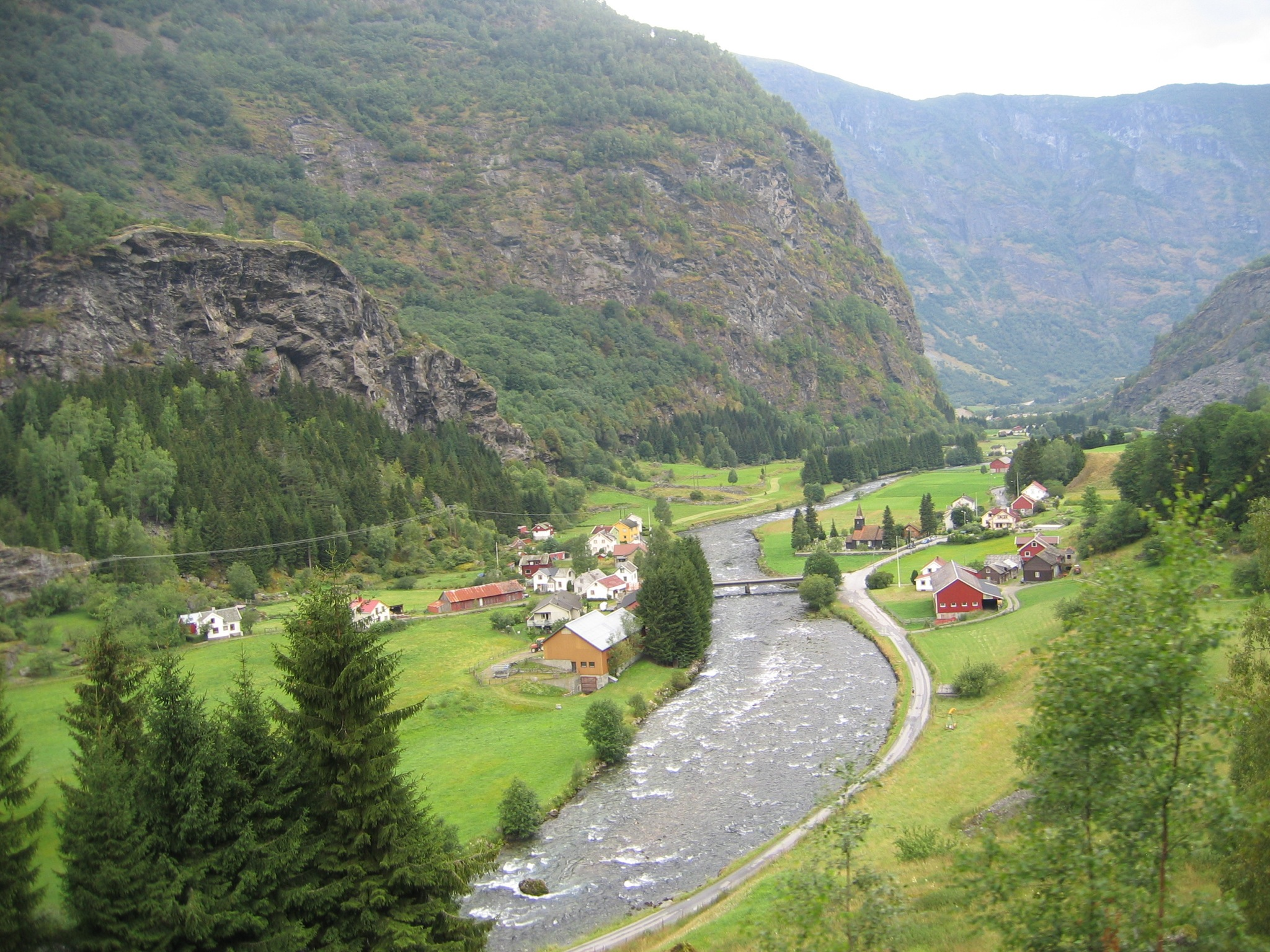

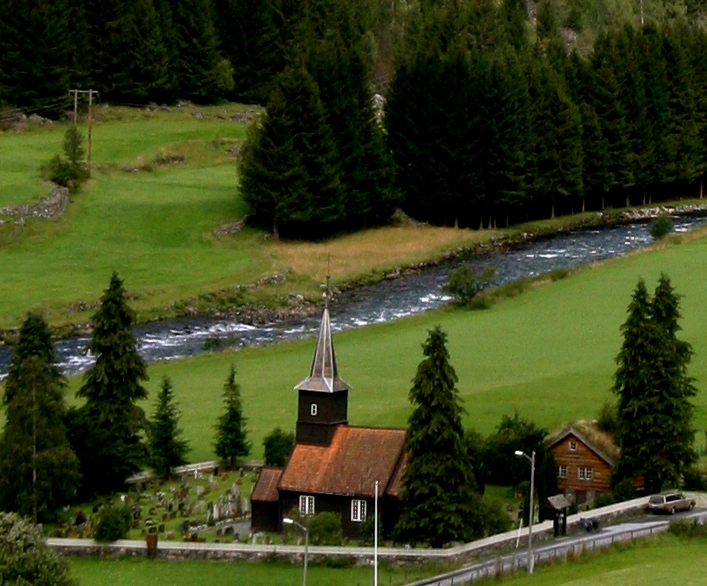

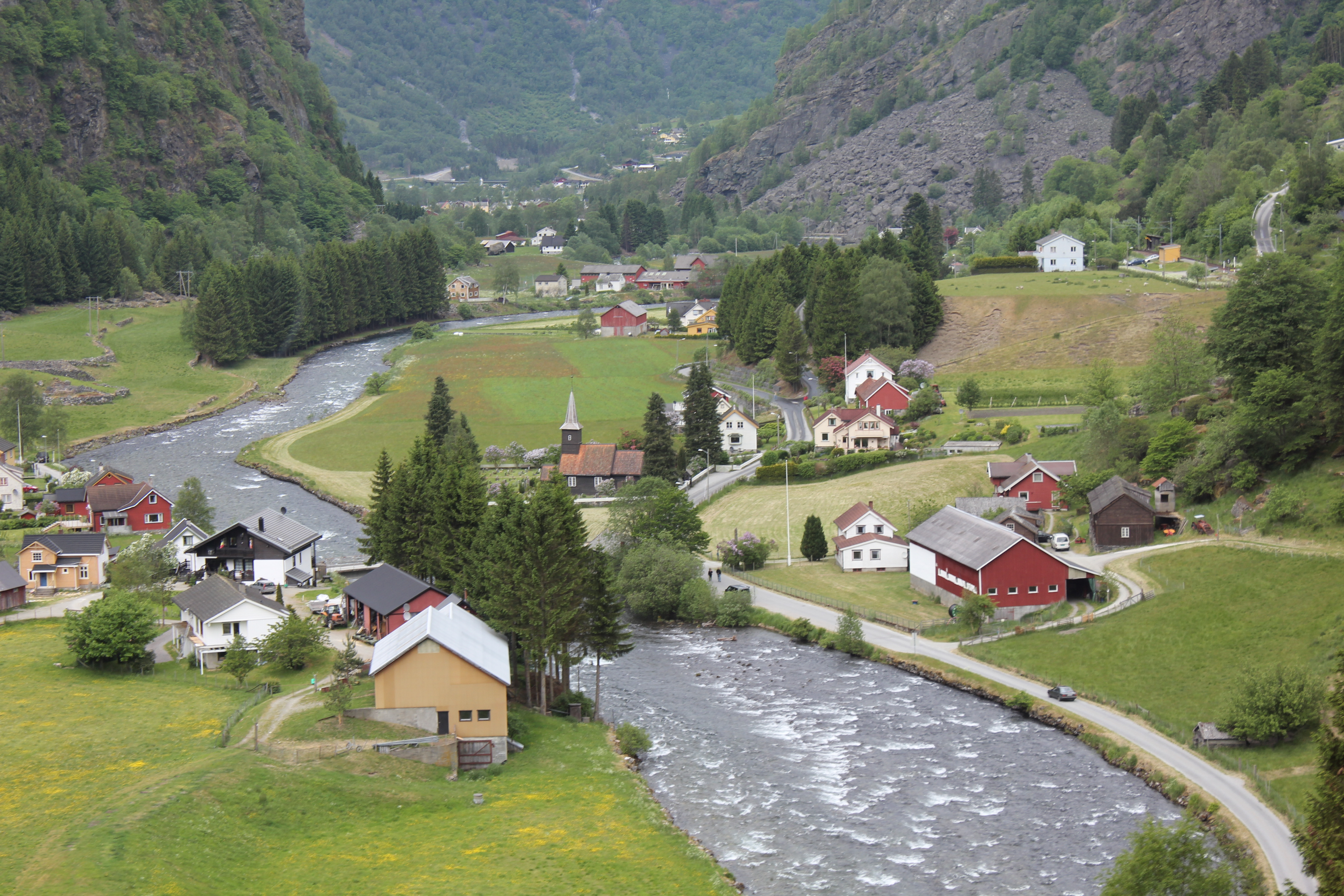

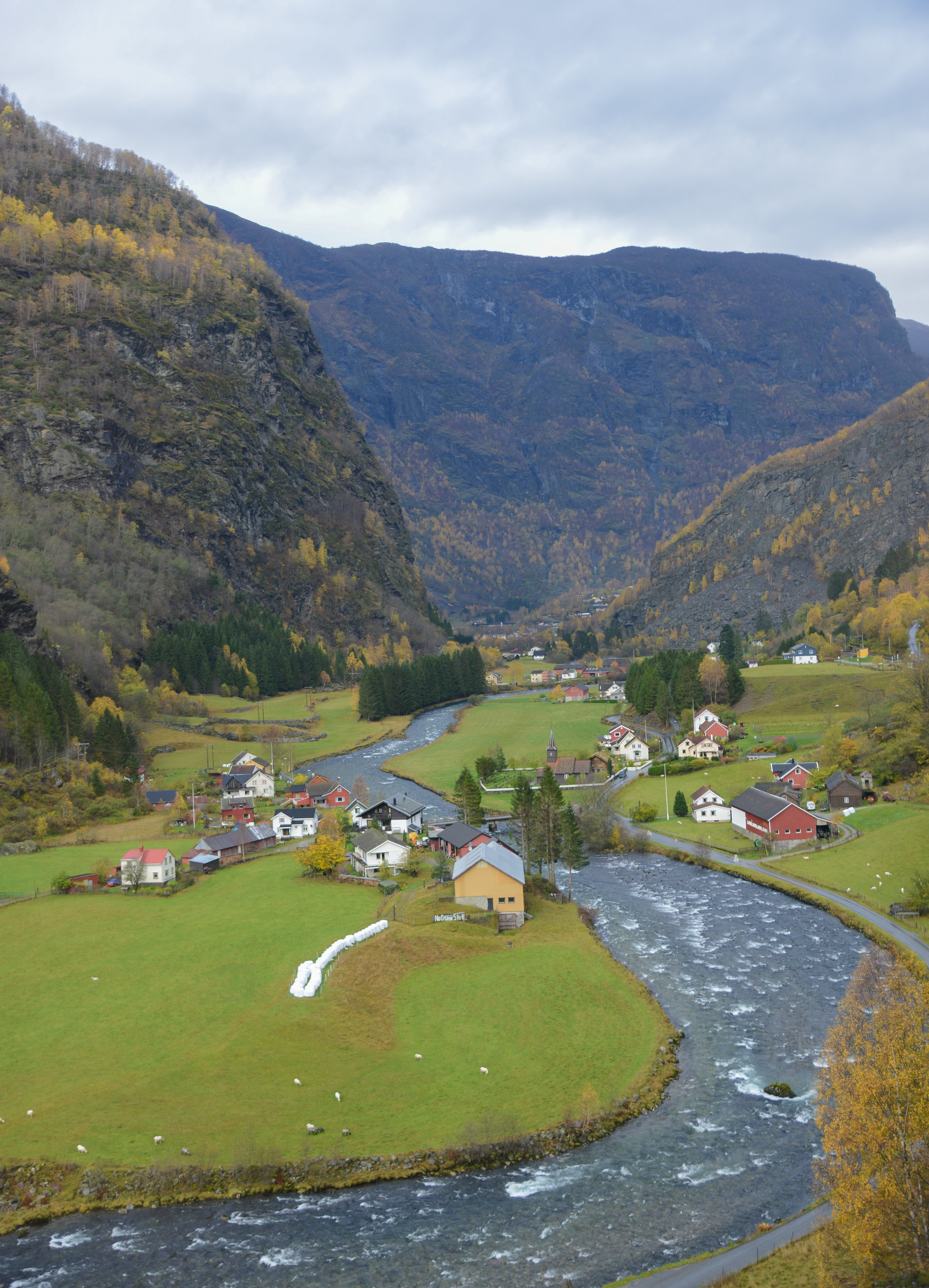

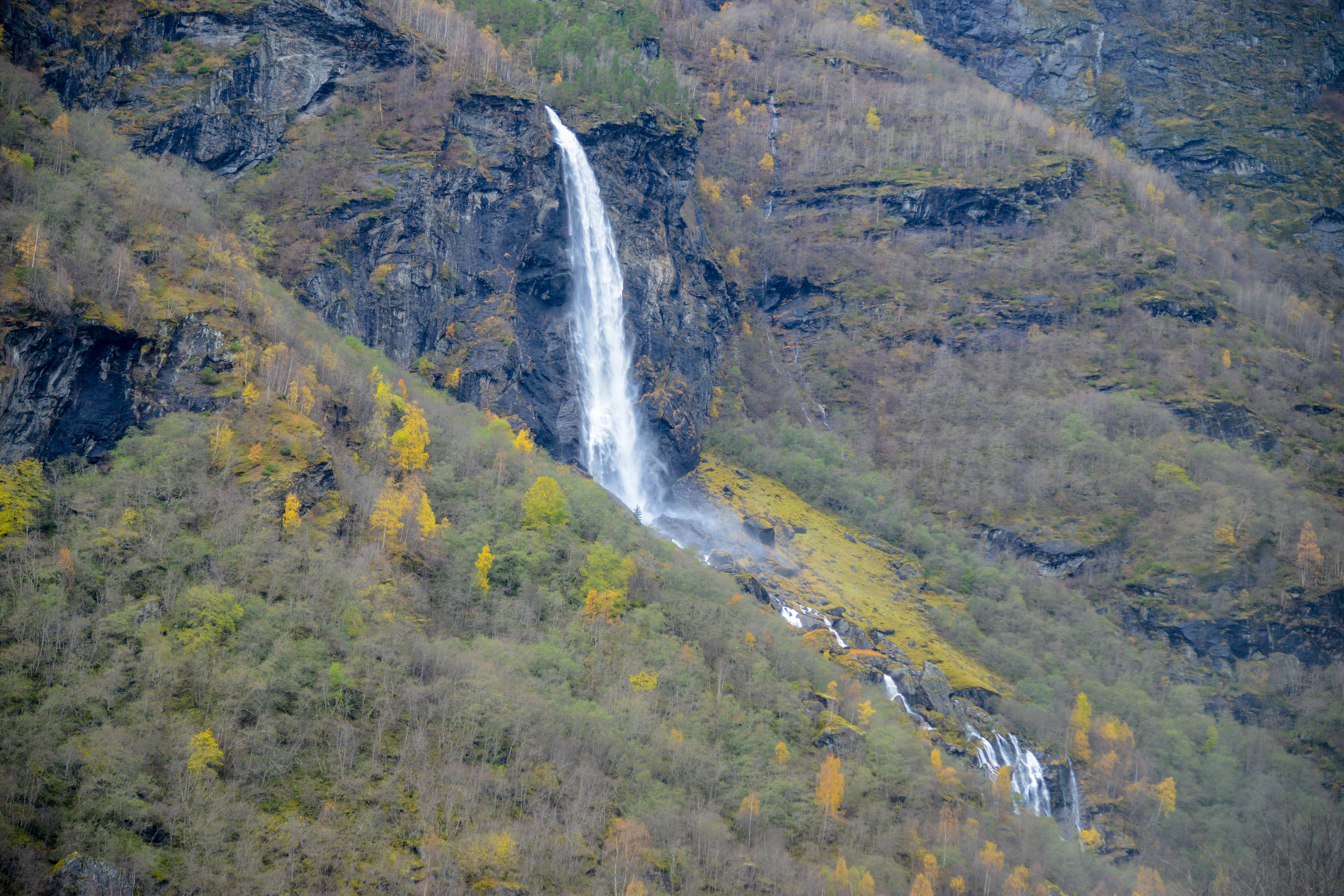

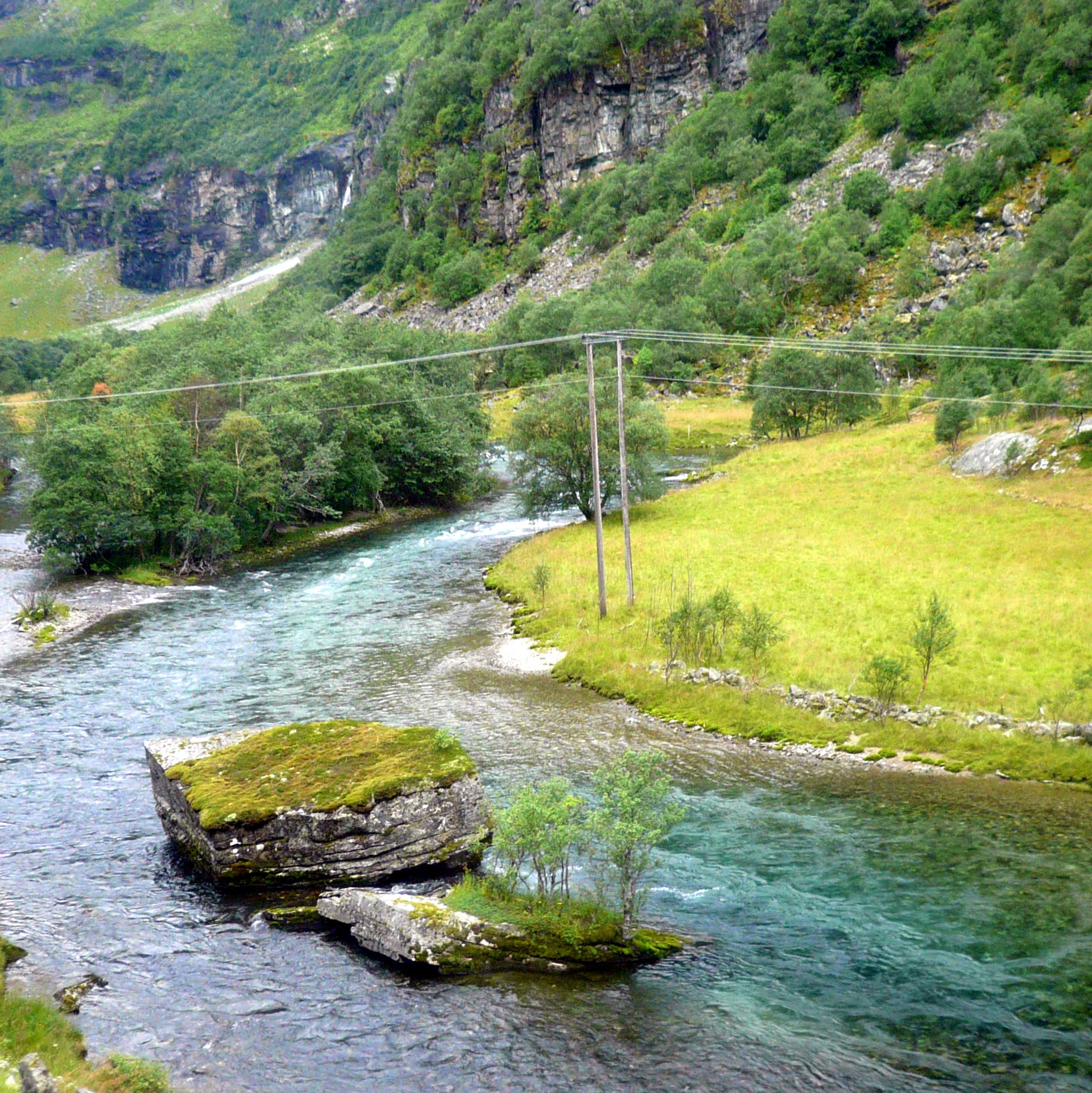

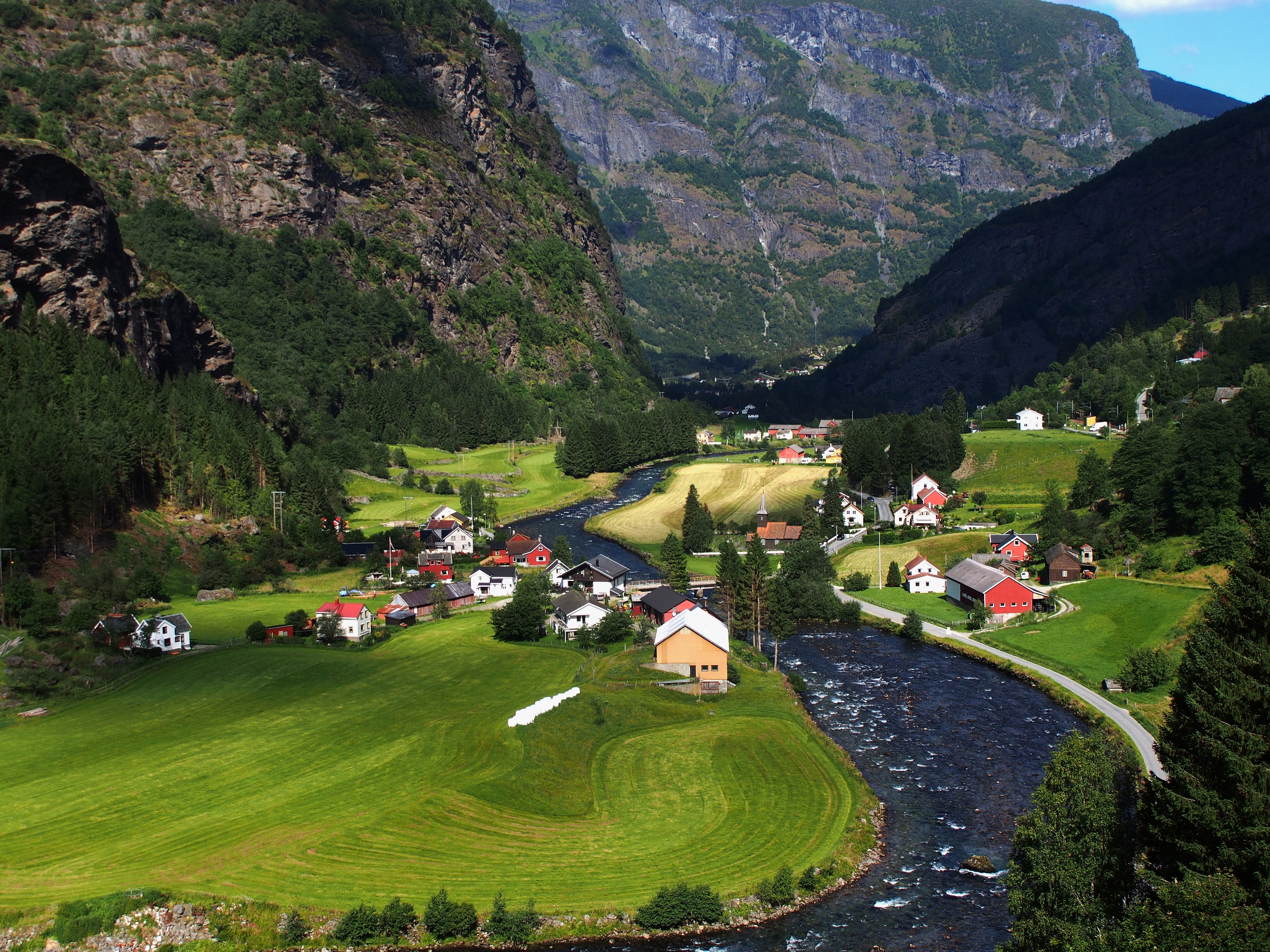

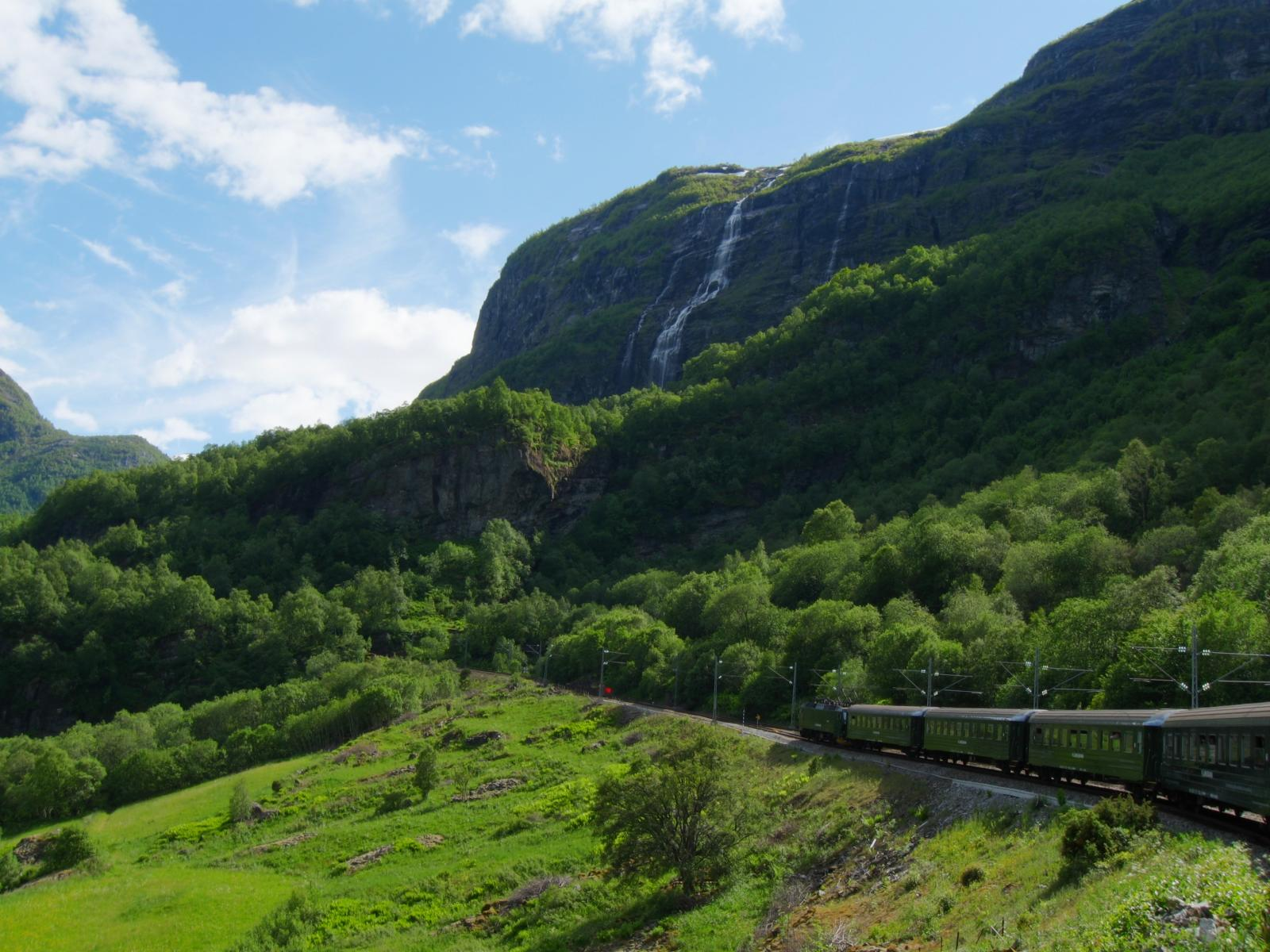

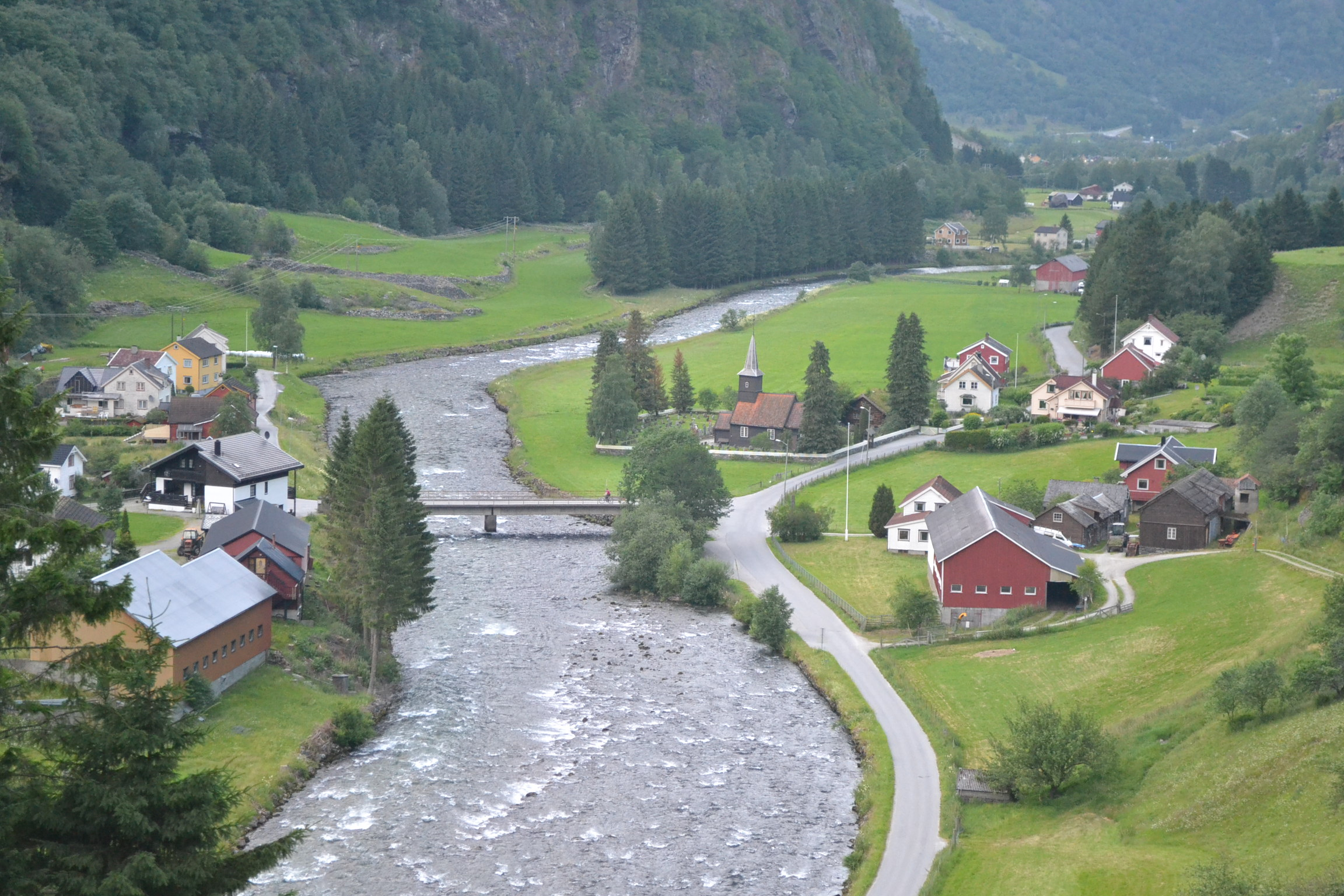

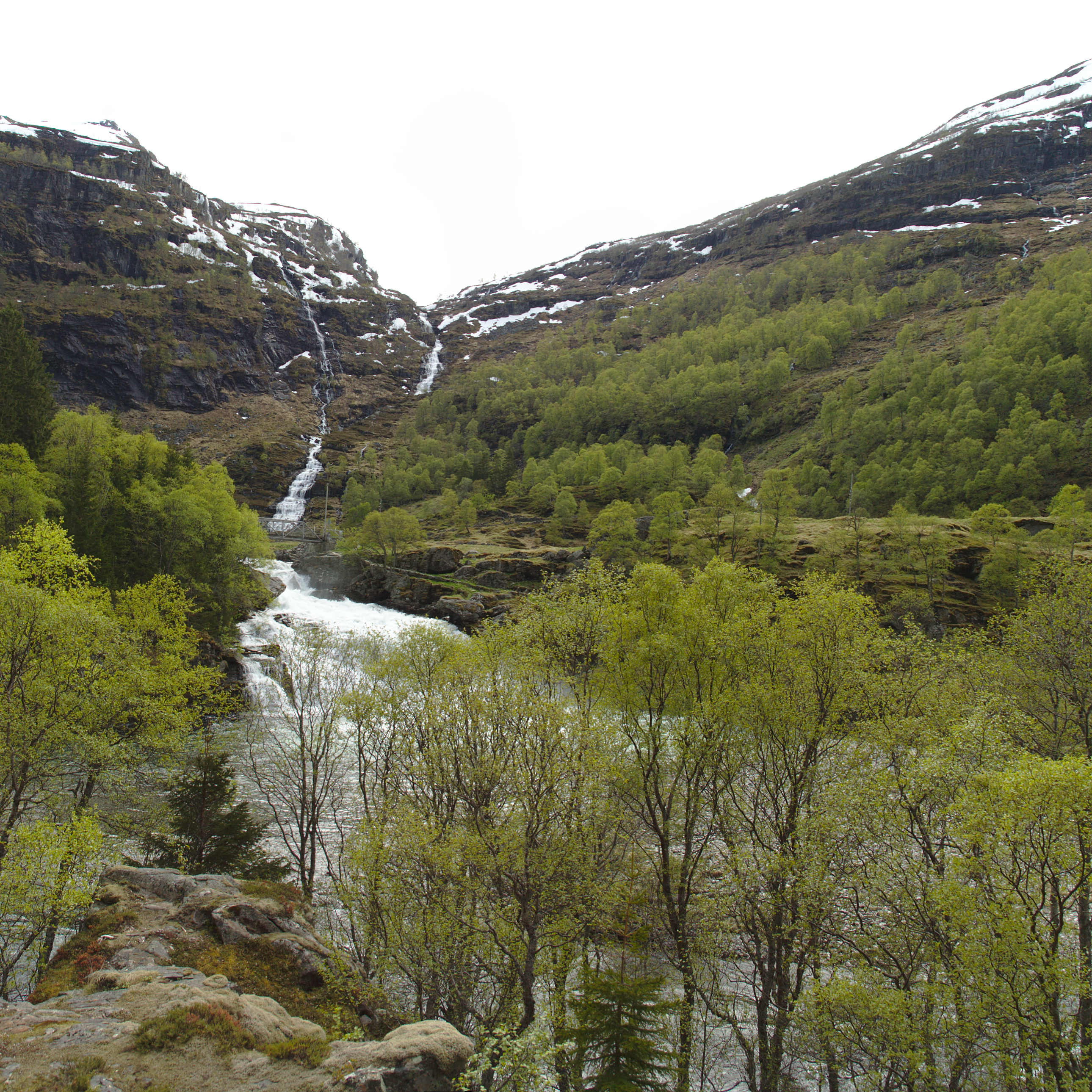

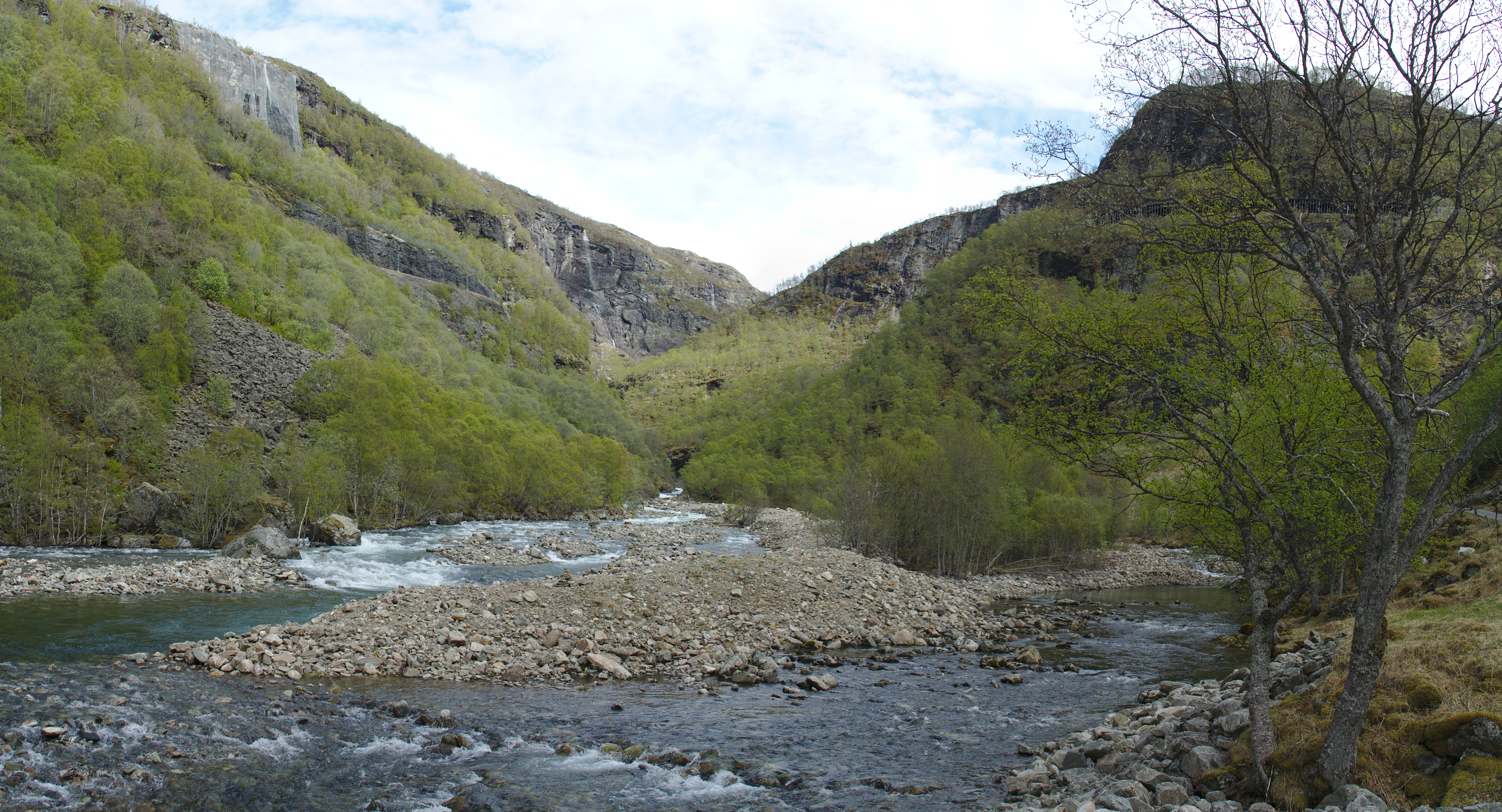

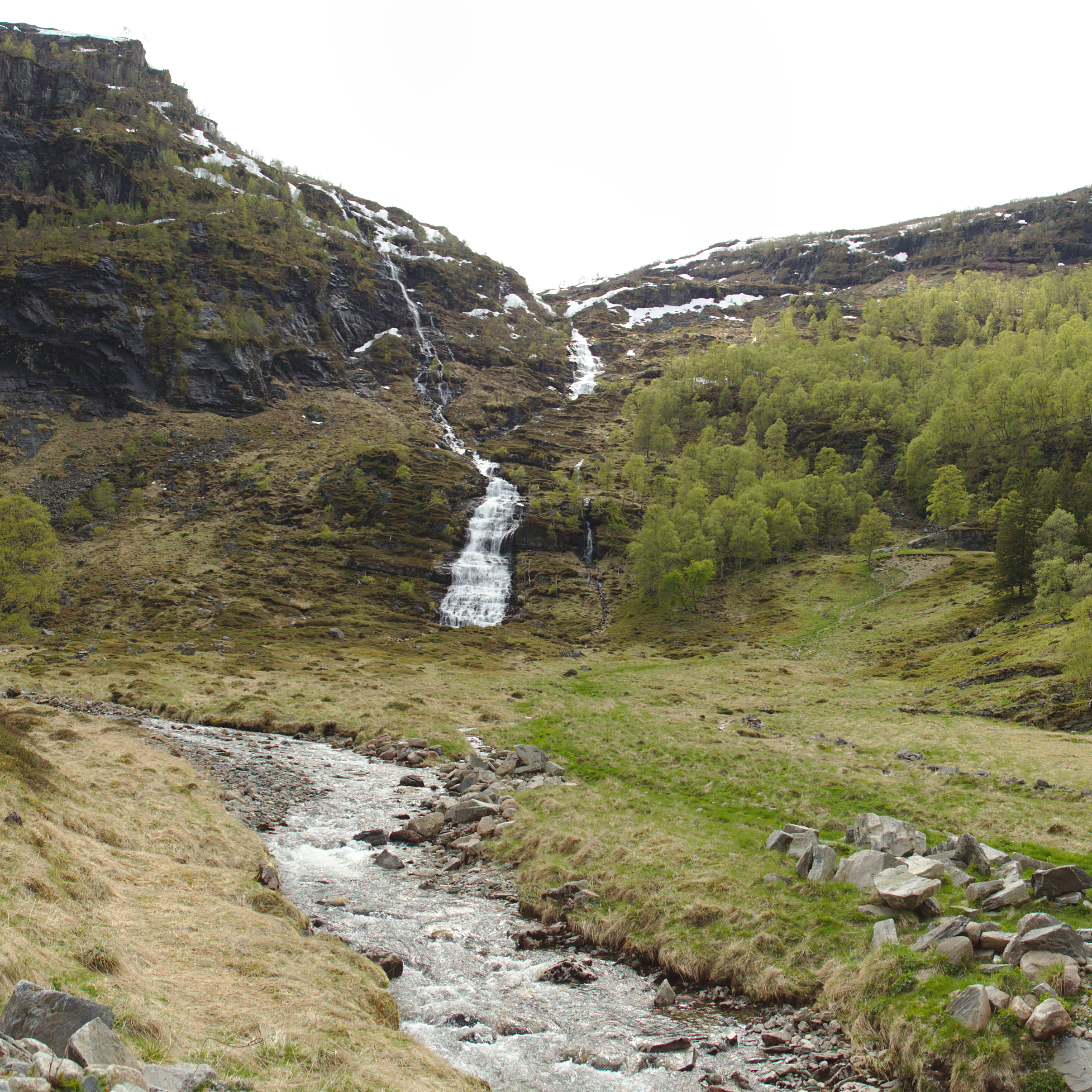
