= Ægir Bryggeri =

Micro brewery in Flåm, Norway

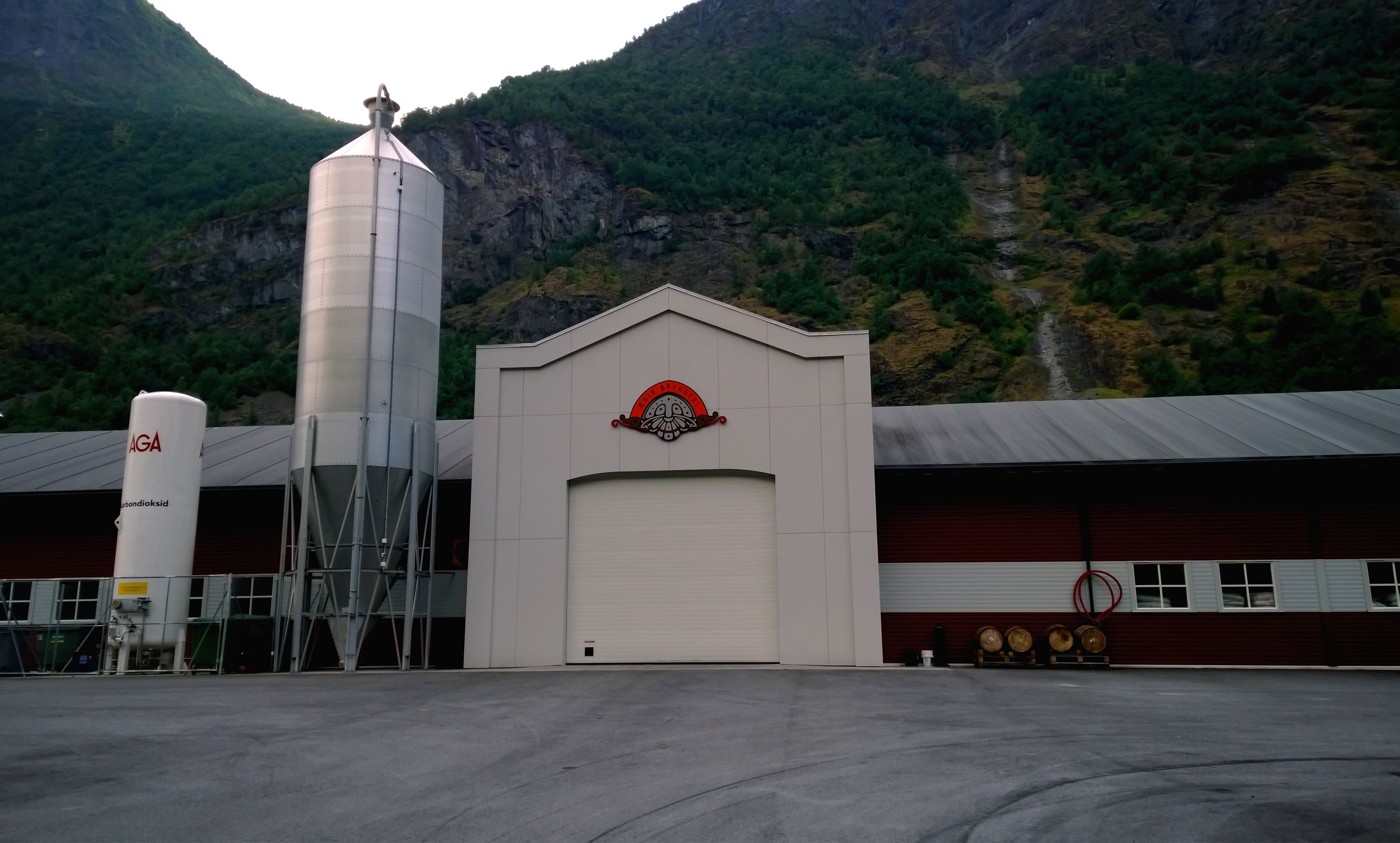
Ægir Bryggeri

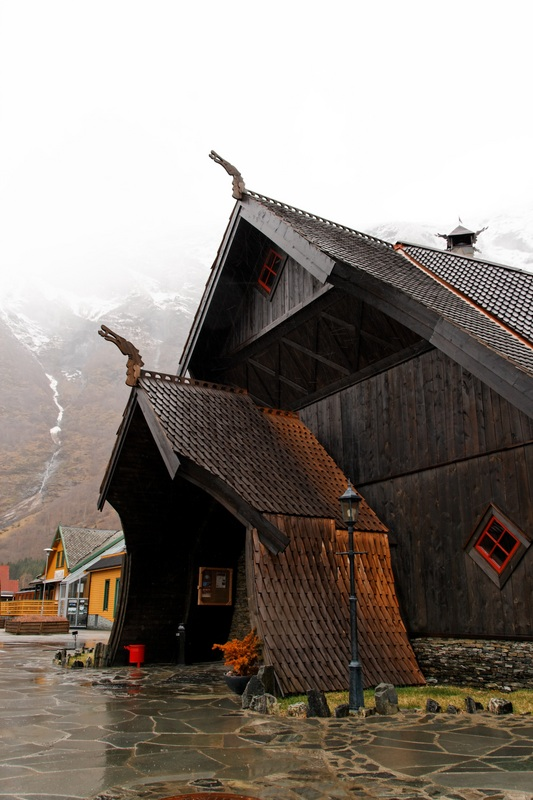
Ægir Bryggeri's pub in Flåm is located in a house with a building style, inspired by the Middle Ages in Norway

Ægir Bryggeri is a micro brewery in Flåm, Norway. The brewery is named after the Norse god Ægir. Ægir brews, according to Odin, the best of beers. The brewery was founded by Aud Melås and Evan Lewis in 2007. A new brewery facility was built and put into service in June 2012. The brewery produces craft beers in cans and for the own brewery pub in Flåm. An increasing share of the production is for export. Ægir Bryggeri delivers beer for sale throughout Norway.

The kinds of beer vary, and consist of beer types, inspired from various craft breweries around the world, including the United States. The brewery has an annual capacity of around 1,400 hectolitres (300,000 US pt).

== Products ==
Some of the products from Ægir Bryggeri:

- Bøyla Blonde Ale, 4.7% alcohol
- India Pale Ale, 6.5% alc.
- Rallar Amber Ale, 4.7% alc.
- Sumbel Porter, 4.7% alc.
- Ægir Ratatosk Double IPA, 9% alc.
- Heidrun Vikingmjød, 13.2% alc.

In addition to these, that are made throughout the year, the brewery also has several seasonal types.
