= Flåm =

Village in Aurland Municipality, Norway

Flåm Flaam (historic)
- Village
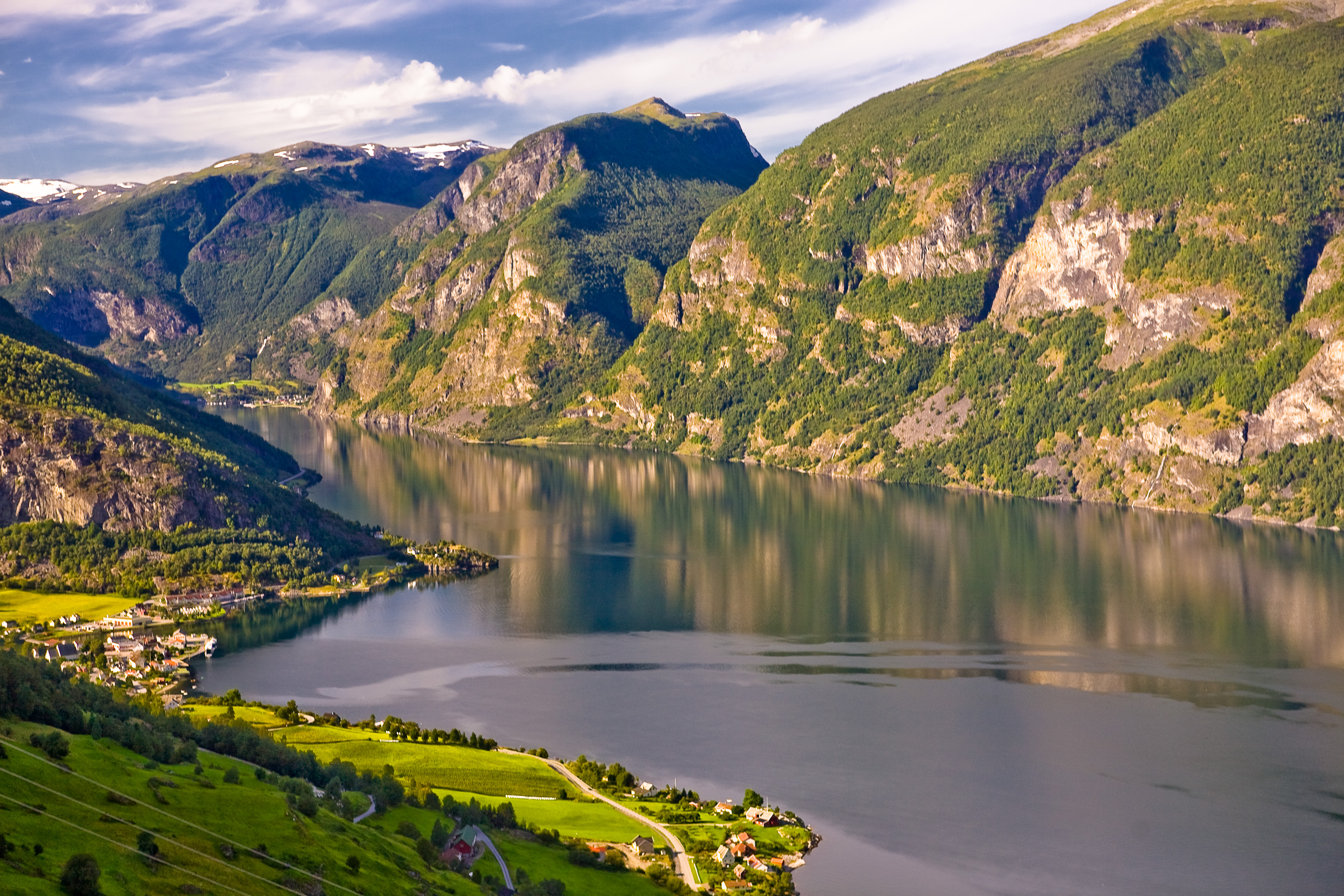
- View of Aurlandsvangen and Flåm
- Interactive map of Flåm
- Location within Vestland Location within Norway
- Coordinates: 60.86157°N 7.1151°E
- Country: Norway
- Region: Western Norway
- County: Vestland
- District: Sogn
- Municipality: Aurland Municipality

Area
  - Total: 0.4 km^{2} (0.15 sq mi)
- Elevation: 2 m (6.6 ft)

Population (2025)
  - Total: 293
  - Density: 733/km^{2} (1,900/sq mi)
- Time zone: UTC+01:00 (CET)
  - Summer (DST): UTC+02:00 (CEST)
- Post Code: 5743 Flåm

Flåm (Norwegian pronunciation: [floːm]) is a village in the Flåmsdalen valley which is located at the inner end of the Aurlandsfjorden, a branch of Sognefjorden. The village is located in Aurland Municipality in Vestland county, Norway.

The 0.4-square-kilometre (99-acre) village has a population (2025) of 293 and a population density of 733 inhabitants per square kilometre (1,900/sq mi).

== History ==
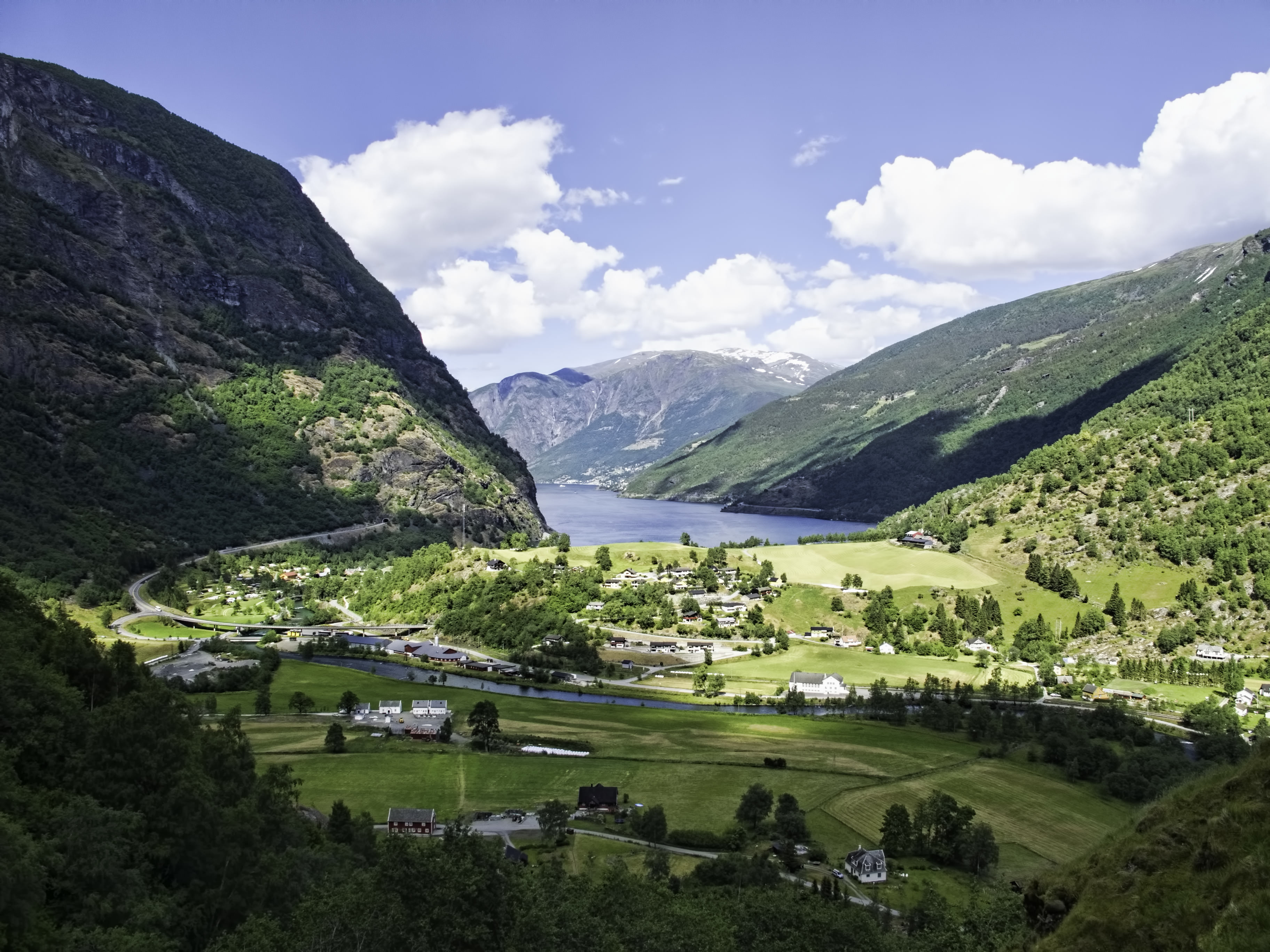
Flåm in Flåmsdalen at the inner end of Aurlandsfjorden

In 1670, Flåm Church was built in the village, replacing an older stave church.

In 1908, the Norwegian Parliament approved the construction of the Flåm Line railway, though the funds to construct the railway were not allocated until 1923. In 1942, regular operation of steam-powered trains started on the Flåm Line.

By the 1960s, cruise ships had begun anchoring in the fjord (they were too large to dock, so passengers would take smaller boats ashore).

The original Fretheim Hotel, established in the late 1800s, expanded to welcome more international guests, offering a comfortable stay amid the wild nature. The Norway in a Nutshell tour – a popular packaged day-trip including the Flåm Railway and fjord ferry – started bringing many visitors to Flåm starting in the 1980s and onward. In 2000, Flåm built a new pier that allowed large cruise ships to dock directly which led to a great increase in tourism.

=== Name ===
The name Flåm is documented as early as 1340 as Flaam. It is derived from the plural dative form of the Old Norse word flá meaning "plain, flat piece of land," and it refers to the flat plains surrounding the Flåm river valley which sits between steep mountains.

== Transportation ==
=== Air ===
The closest airport is Sogndal Airport, Haukåsen, approximately 70 kilometres (43 mi) from Flåm.

=== Road ===
The European route E16 highway between Oslo and Bergen runs through Flåm. The village sits about 7 kilometres (4.3 mi) southwest of the municipal centre of Aurlandsvangen, 12 kilometres (7.5 mi) south of the village of Undredal, and 15 kilometres (9.3 mi) east of the village of Gudvangen (through the Gudvanga Tunnel).

The Navvy road, Rallarvegen, stretches from Myrdal down to Flåm; pedestrians and bicyclists still use it. At Myrdal, it connects with the Navvy road for the previously built Bergen Line.

=== Rail ===
Flåm is also connected by rail through the Flåm Line, a branch line of the Bergen Line, the line itself travels though picturesque views so is popular with tourists.

=== Sea ===
The port can take up to three cruise-ships a day, although there is a limit of 5,000 passengers leaving the ship at a time. In 2020, it was announced that a large 16MVA power connection was going to be built, allowing ships to turn off their engines while docked (known as "Cold ironing") and in May 2025 a contractor was announced.

== Tourism ==
The village of Flåm has been a tourist destination since the late 19th century. It currently receives almost 450,000 visitors a year. Most ride the 20-kilometre (12 mi) Flåm Line between Flåm and Myrdal Station, one of the steepest railway tracks at 1 in 18 (not counting rack railways) in the world. There are also a few spirals. A former rail station building in Flåm now houses a museum dedicated to the Flåm railway.

The harbour of Flåm receives some 160 cruise ships per year.

=== Issues due to tourism ===
Air pollution in Flåm and nearby Geiranger during the cruise season is similar to that of a big city. Cruise traffic in Norway, which is one of the largest exporters of oil in the world, emits more NOx than all road traffic in Norway combined. In a 2005 Bergens Tidende article, Kjetil Smørås (a hotel director and chairman of Fjord Norge said, "The cruise traffic pollutes more than several ten thousands of cars, and many of the worst ships sail up here (...) cruise tourists trod down the pristine Norwegian nature, and destroy the foundation for Vestlandet's four entries on Unesco's World Heritage lists."

In 2009, Jens Riisnæs (an author and NRK journalist) said, "We have the world's most beautiful nation, we don't need to follow the cruise operators' premises. They can go other places with their polluting ships. It is unwanted noise."

In 2009, Dagens Næringsliv said that a report by Vestlandsforskning says that both, "Flåm and Geiranger are nearing a limit in capacity. It might be an alternative and rather stand forth as a «relaxed», exclusive and somewhat less of a mass tourism, cruise destination."

In a 2014 Dagens Næringsliv article, a farmer said, "Previously the smell of summer was that of grass that had been cut. Now the smell is of heavy oil." A retired couple also talk about fish that have disappeared from the fjord. In Norway, cruise ships are permitted to dump overboard their greywater in the postcard-narrow fjord-arms. Furthermore, the news article says that defecation in public by tourists, is already a problem; the village's train station has the only public toilets, and 200,000 tourists are expected in the summer season.

In 2014, tourism professor Arvid Viken said, "it is about time this [type of] tourism is evaluated somewhat more soberly than how it has been done in many municipalities for some years." Furthermore, the tourism "has low profit per tourist, but is often associated with considerable costs for the municipal administrations."

== Notable people ==
- Per Sivle, the notable poet was born in Flåm

== In media ==
Part of the book "The Ship of the Dead" by Rick Riordan is set in Flåm.

== Media gallery ==
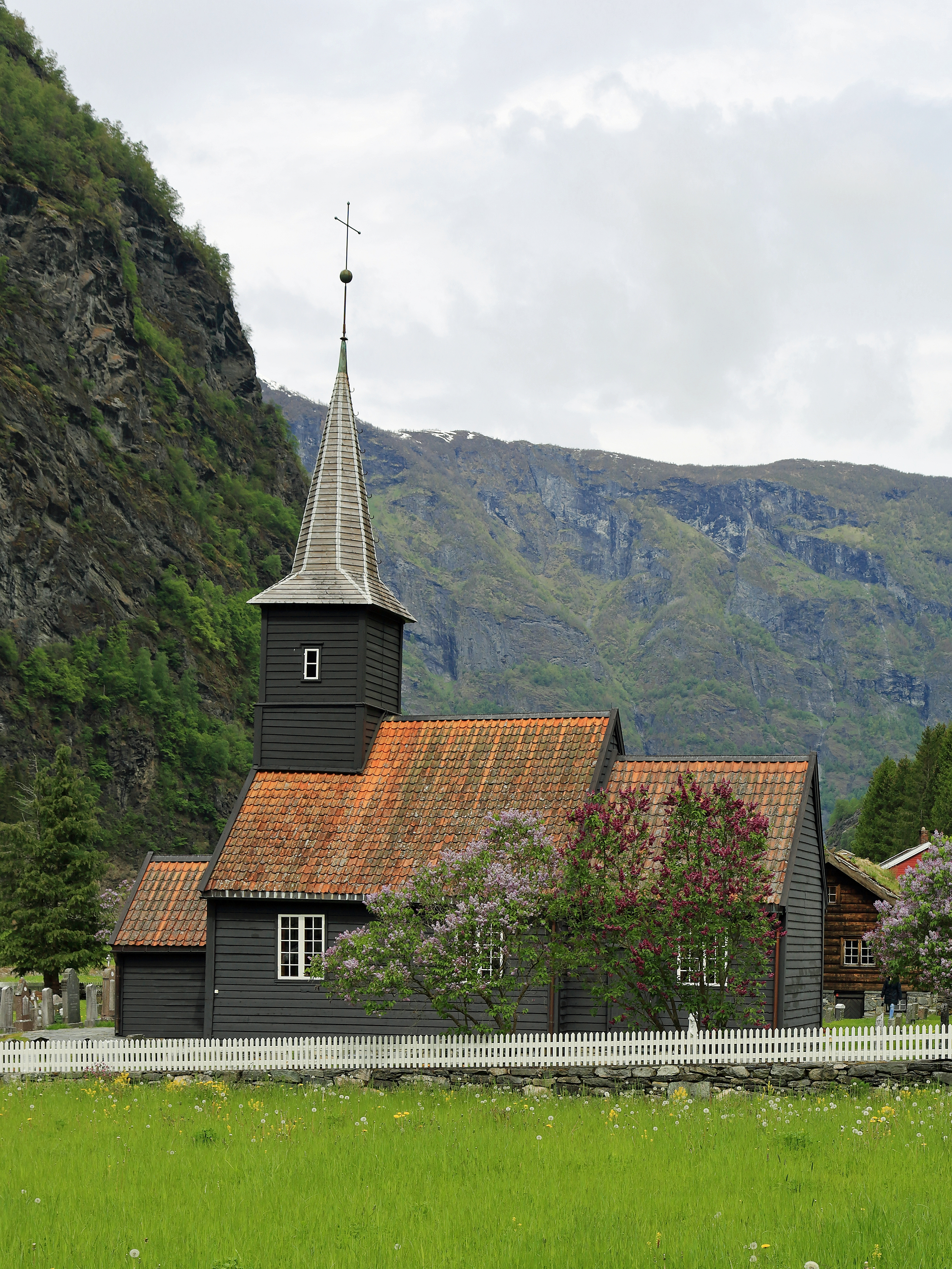
Flåm Church, built in 1670

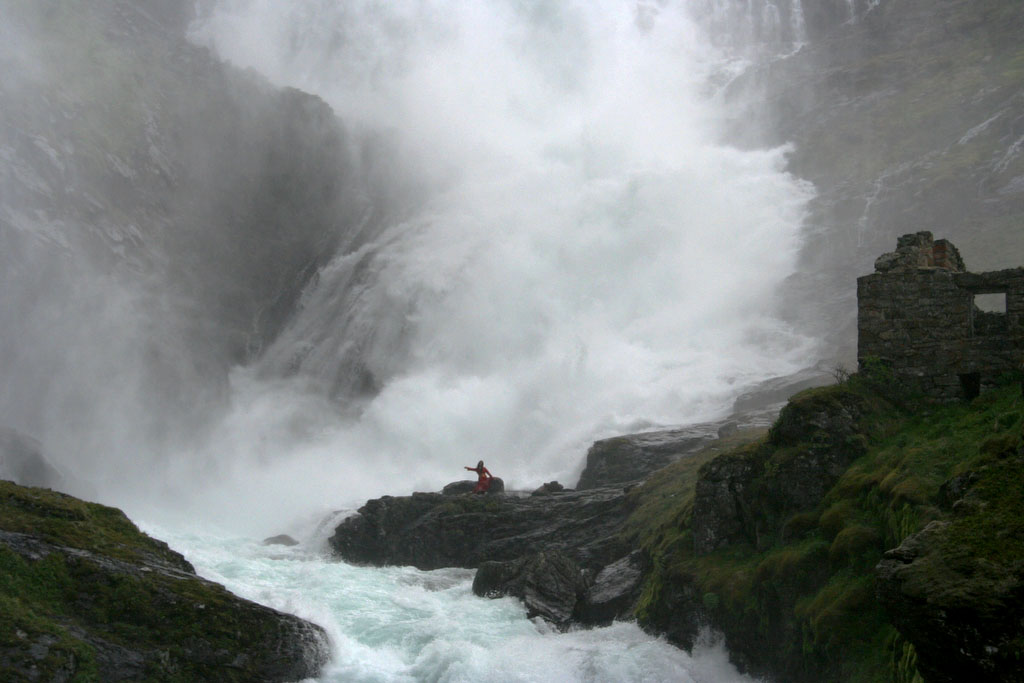
The Kjosfoss waterfall along the Flåmsbana, the railway line from Flåm to Myrdal

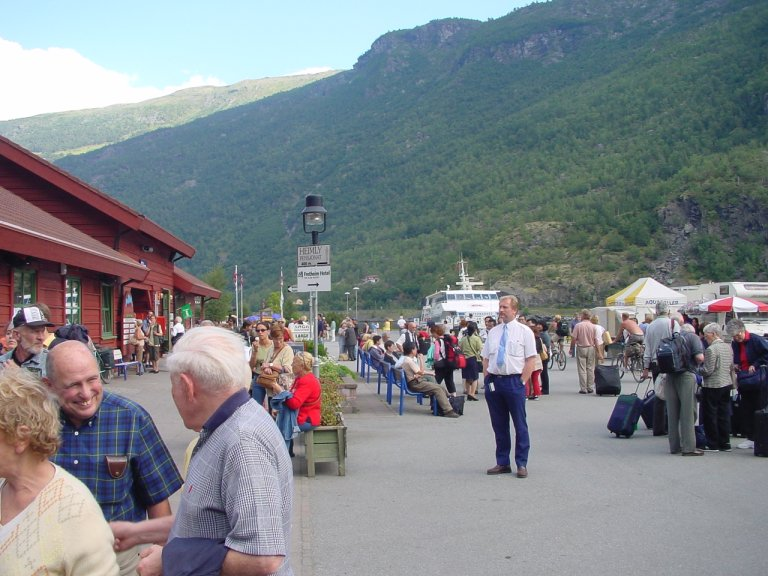
Tourists at the railway station in Flåm. The station has the village's only public toilets

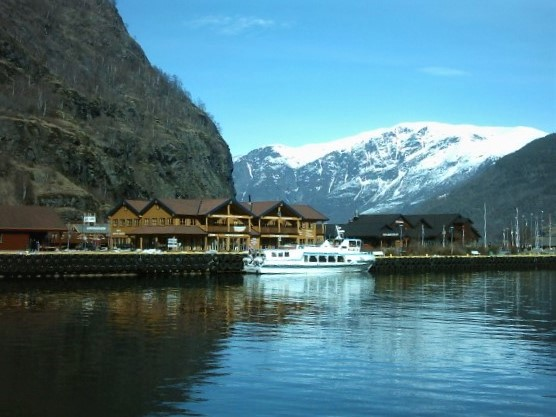
Flåm harbour

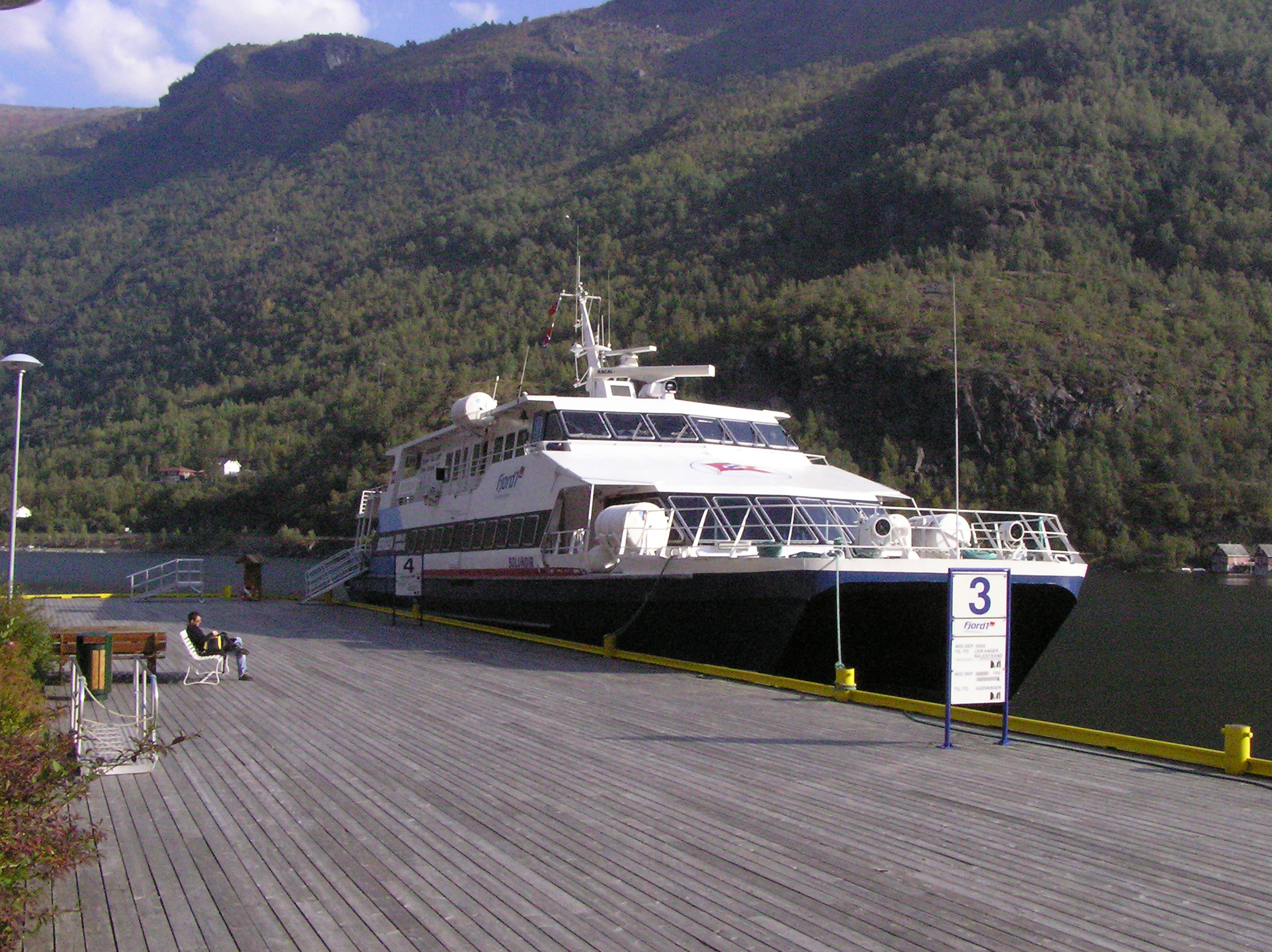
A catamaran in Flåm harbour

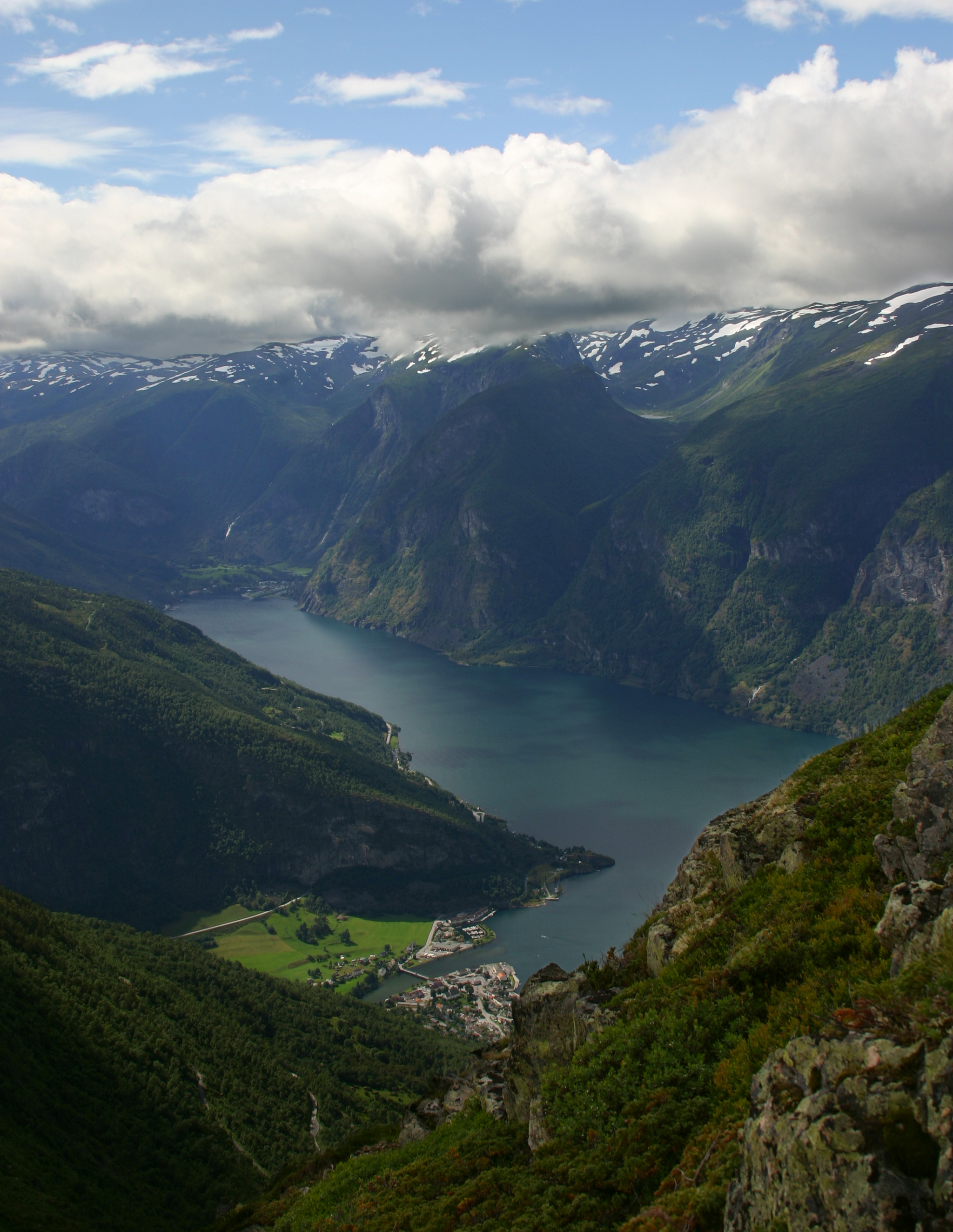
View of Aurlandsfjord and Flåm from a nearby summit

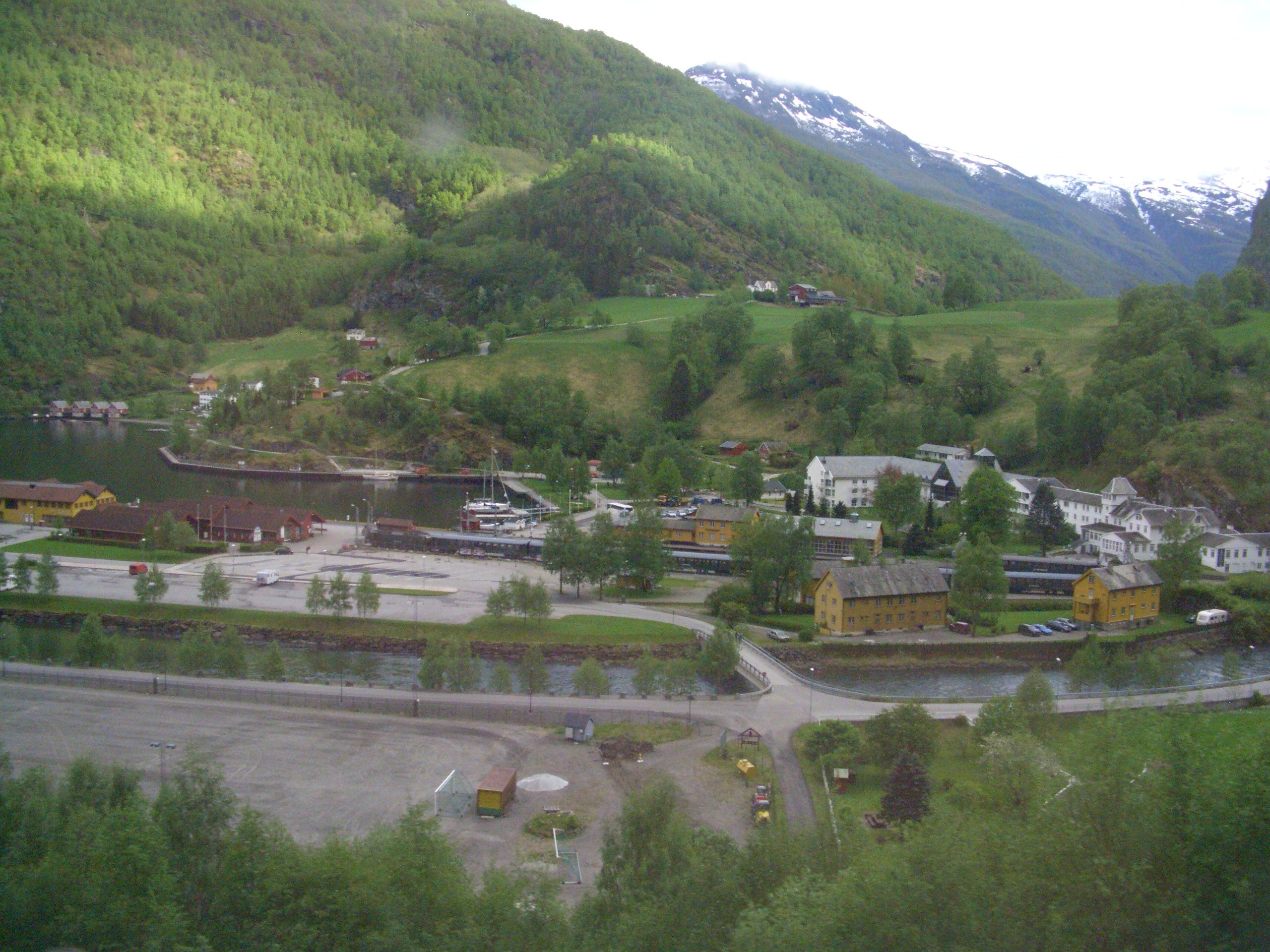
View from Flåm

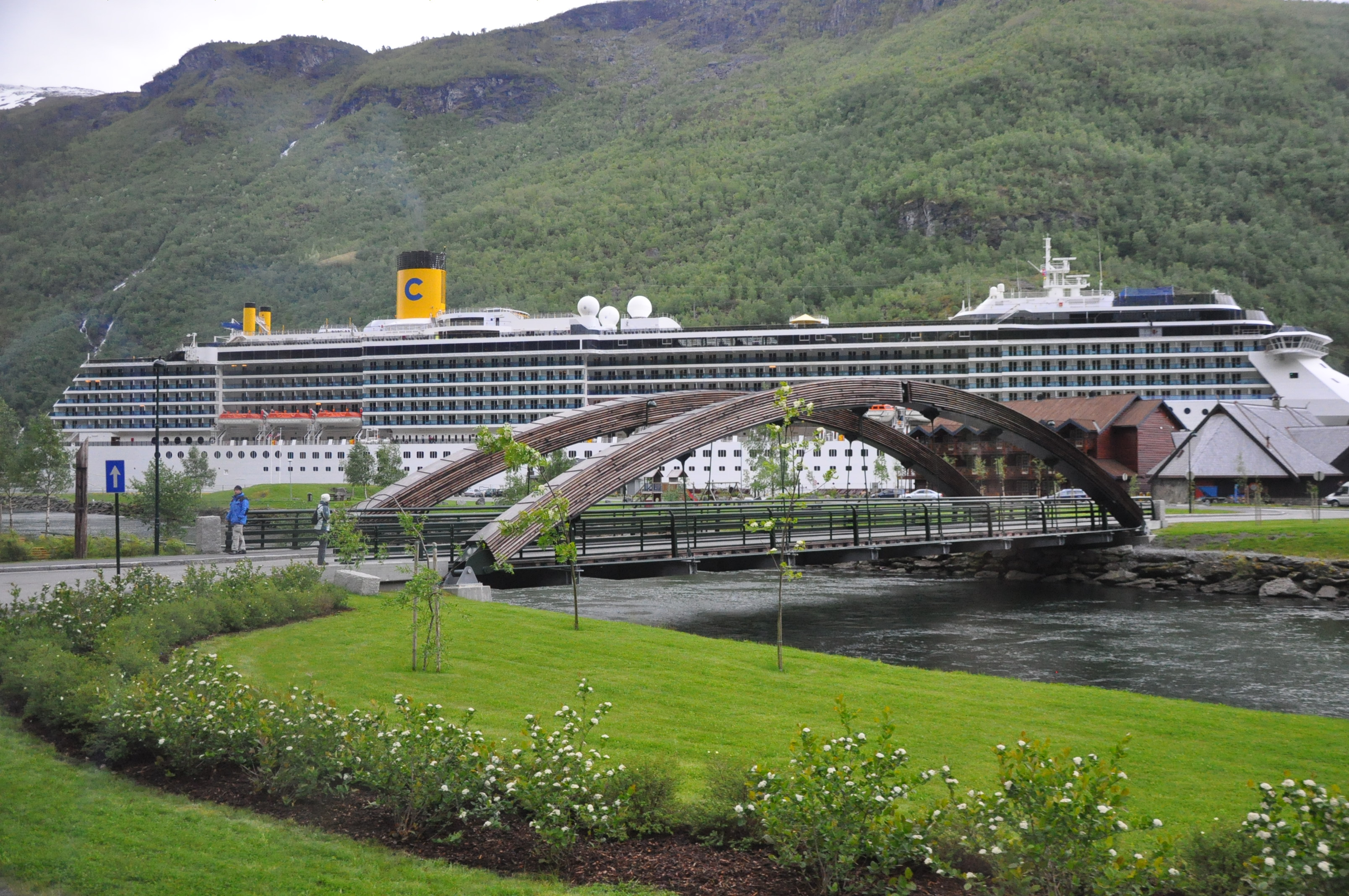
View of Flåm bridge with cruise ship behind

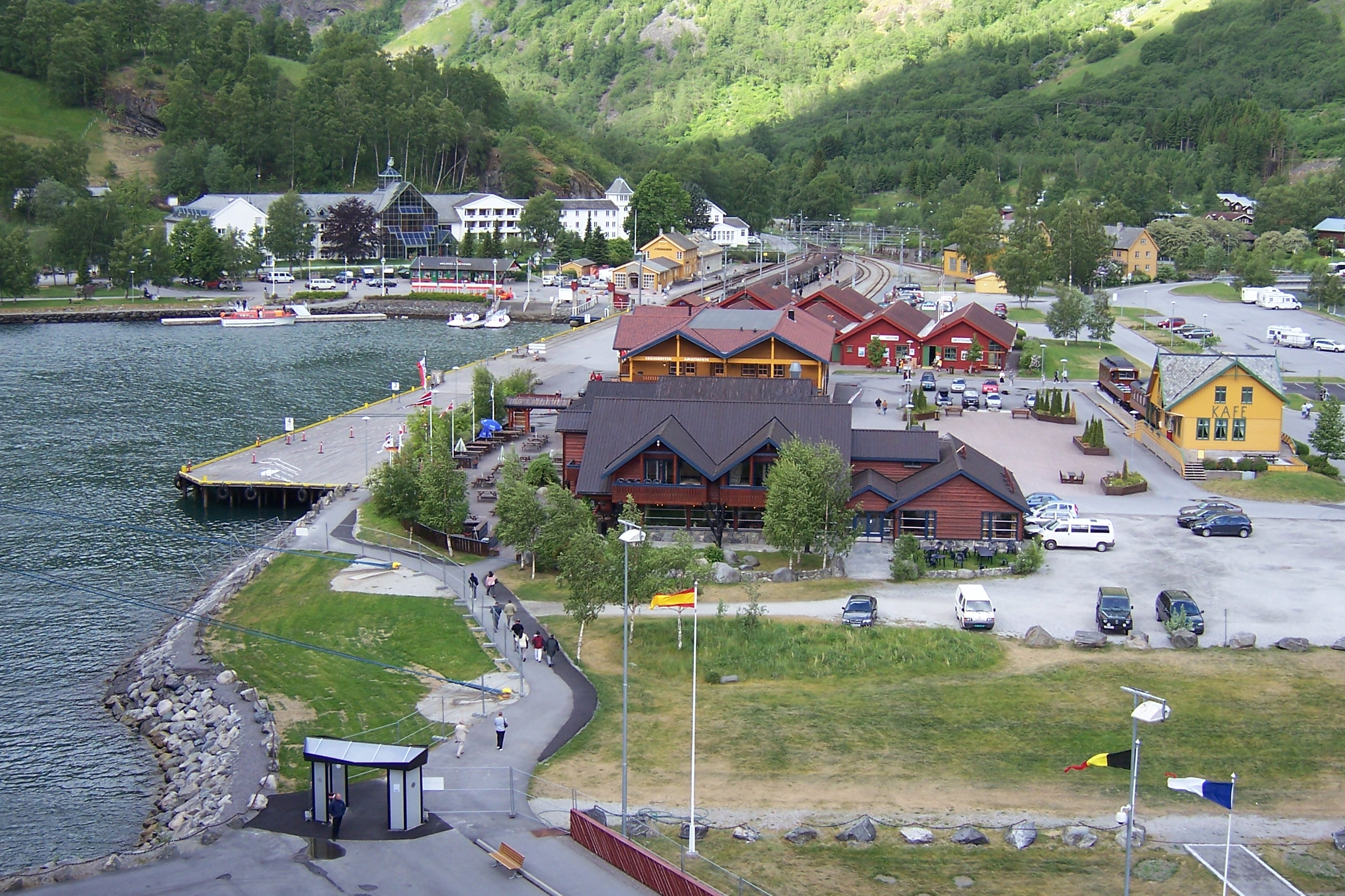
Flåm harbour and railway station

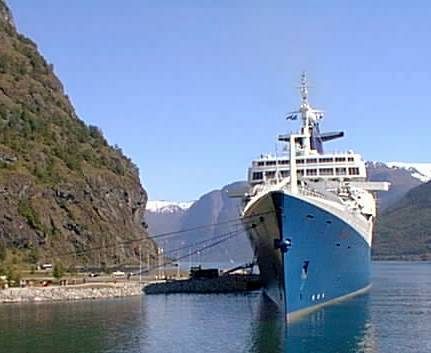
The SS Norway in Flåm, 1999

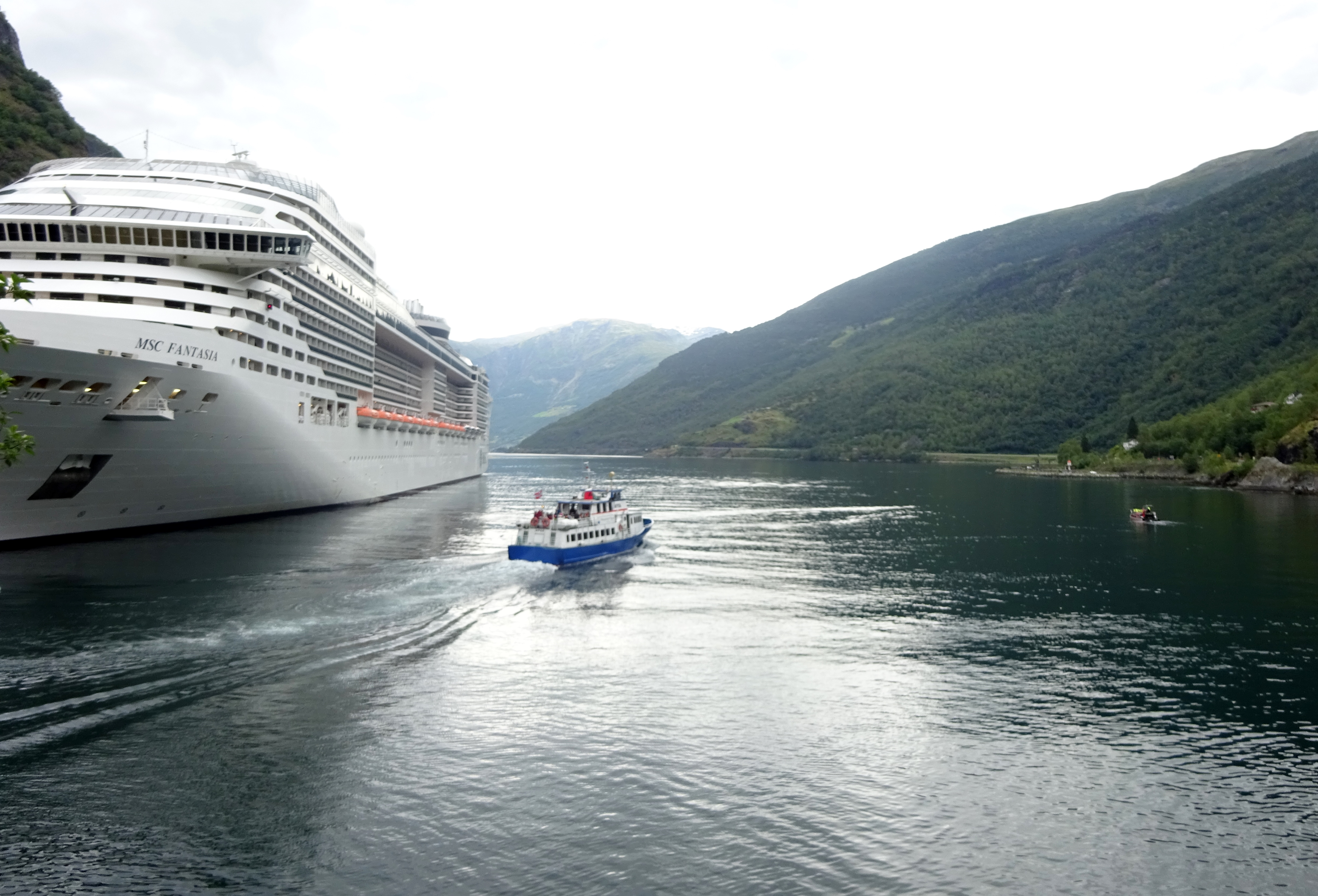
The MSC Fantasia in Flåm

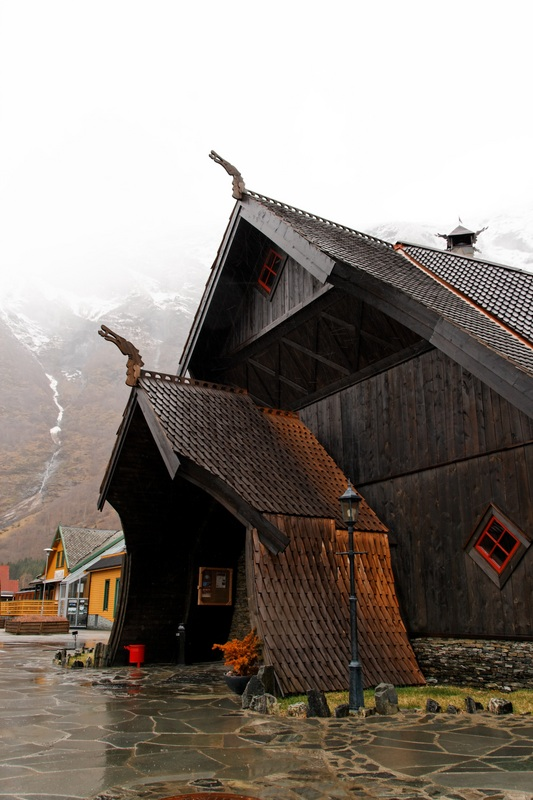
Ægir, a micro brewery and pub in a traditional-style building

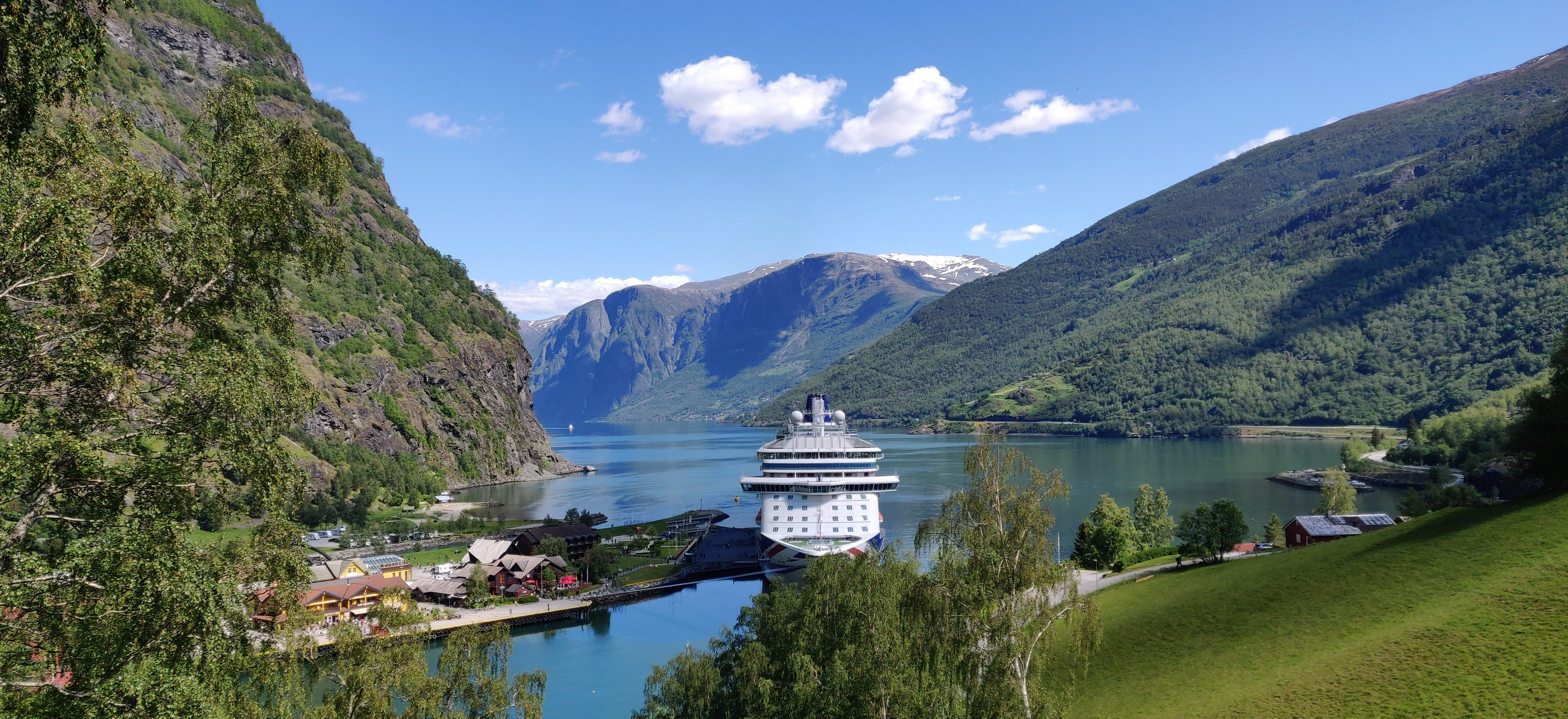
P&O MV Britannia docked in Flåm

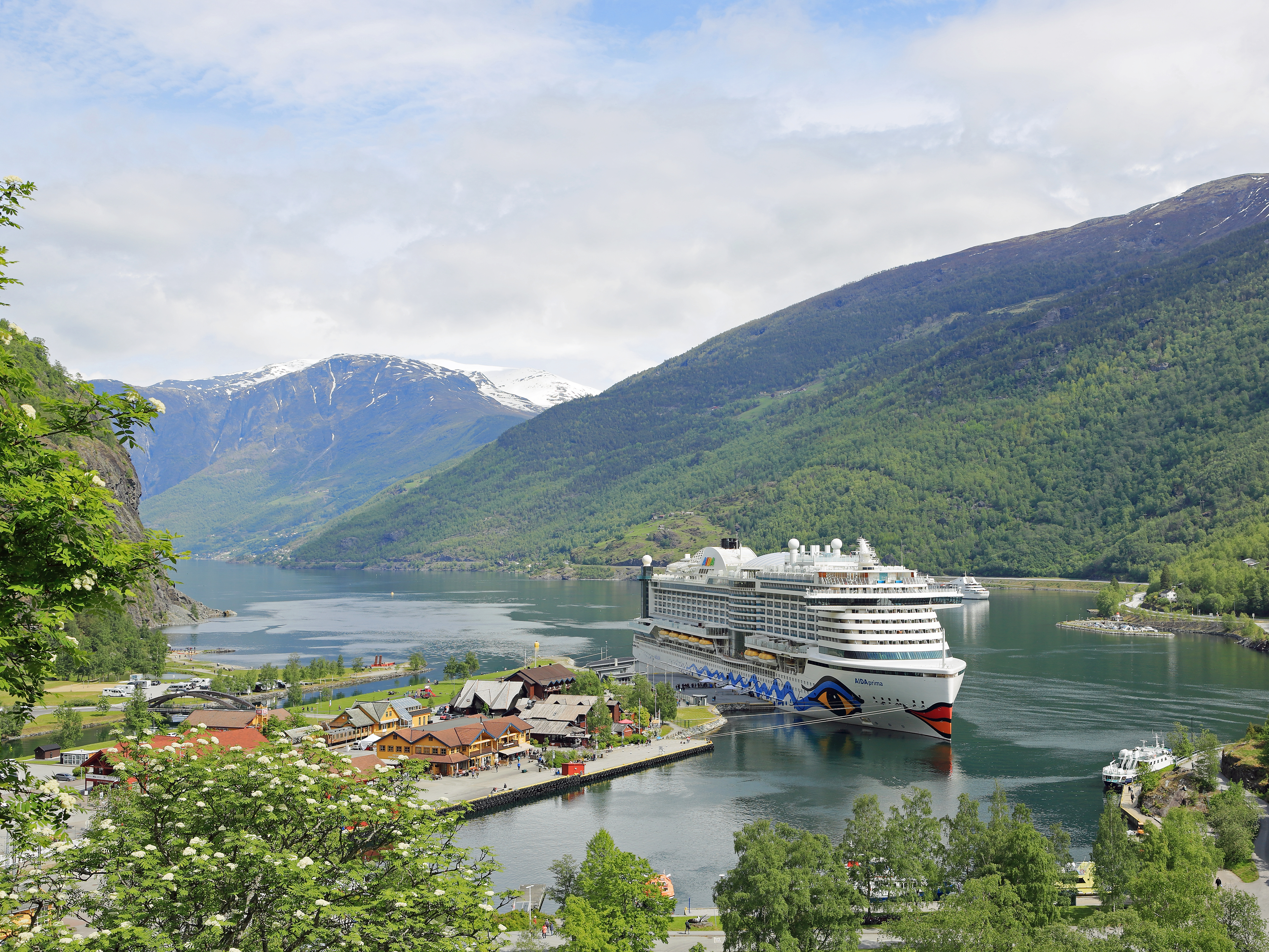
AIDAprima in Flåm
