= Myrdal =

Settlement in Aurland Municipality, Norway

- Settlement
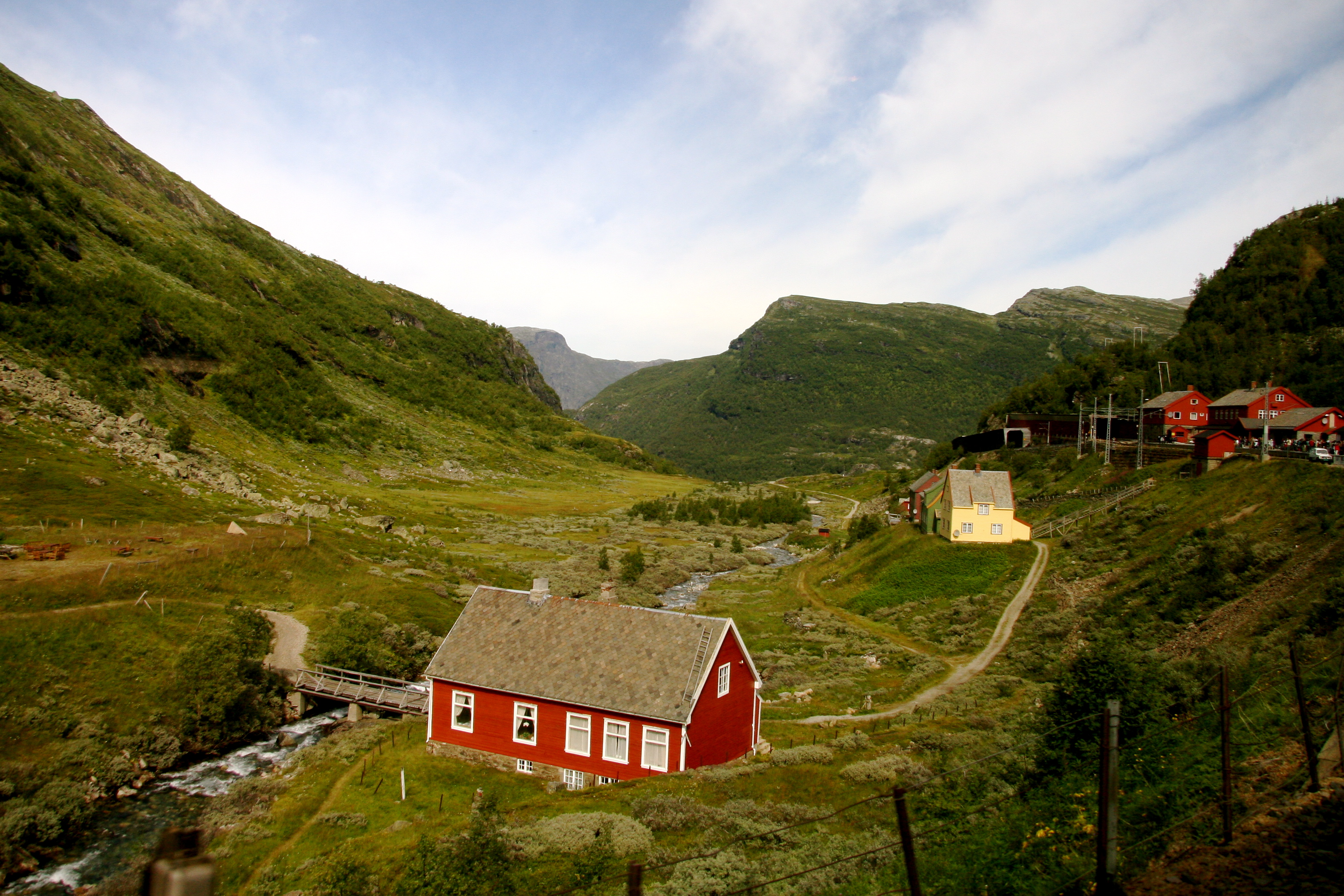
- View of Myrdal with the station to the right
- Interactive map of Myrdal
- Location within Vestland Location within Norway
- Coordinates: 60.73333°N 7.13333°E
- Country: Norway
- Region: Western Norway
- County: Vestland
- District: Sogn
- Municipality: Aurland Municipality
- Elevation: 1,166 m (3,825 ft)
- Time zone: UTC+01:00 (CET)
  - Summer (DST): UTC+02:00 (CEST)
- Post Code: 5718 Myrdal

Myrdal is an area in Aurland Municipality in Vestland county, Norway. Very few people live in Myrdal, as there are only a few village houses dotted around the hills. The village is built around the Myrdal Station, a popular railway stop for tourists along the Bergen Line and the Flåm Line.

From Myrdal, the Flåm Line railway goes northwards in large bends and loops, partly in tunnels, down through the narrow Flåmsdalen valley to the village of Flåm, along the Aurlandsfjorden. Also from Myrdal, a narrow, steep road also runs through Flåmsdalen valley, originally built as a construction road in connection with the construction of the Bergen Railway.
