= Urland =

Urland may refer to:

- Urland, archaic spelling of Aurland Municipality in Vestland county, Norway
- Urland, a fictional kingdom in the 1981 film Dragonslayer
- Urland (performance collective), a performance collective based in the Netherlands
