= Bakka Church =

Church in Vestland, Norway

- Bakka kyrkje
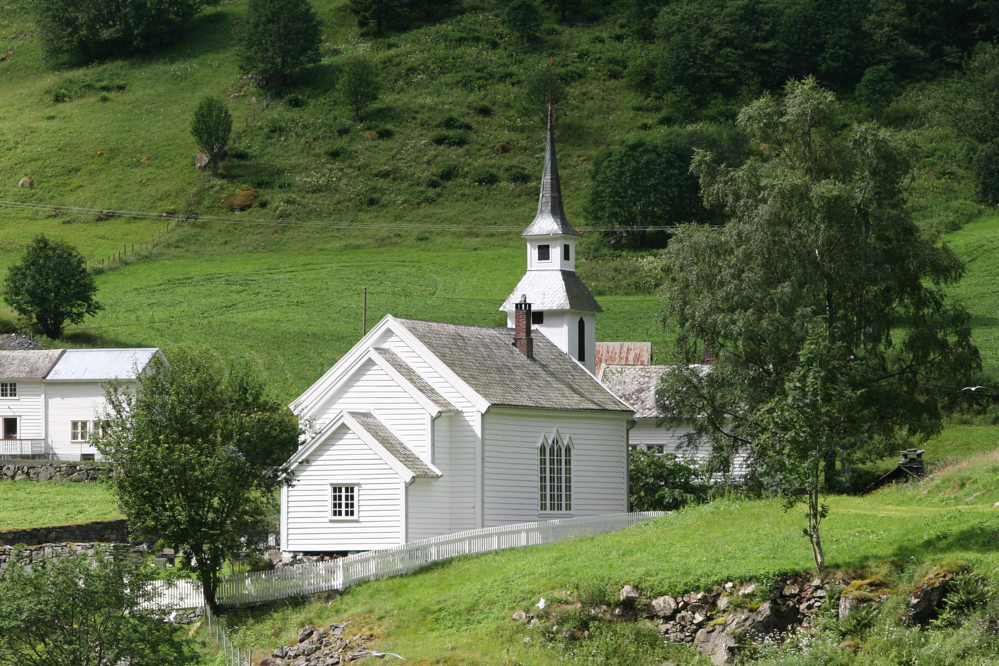
- View of the church
- Bakka Church
- 60°55′02″N 6°52′13″E
- Location: Aurland Municipality, Vestland
- Country: Norway
- Denomination: Church of Norway
- Churchmanship: Evangelical Lutheran

History
- Status: Parish church
- Founded: 1859
- Consecrated: 11 May 1859

Architecture
- Functional status: Active
- Architect: Christian Heinrich Grosch
- Architectural type: Long church
- Completed: 1859 (167 years ago)

Specifications
- Capacity: 200
- Materials: Wood

Administration
- Diocese: Bjørgvin bispedømme
- Deanery: Sogn prosti
- Parish: Nærøy
- Norwegian Cultural Heritage Site
- Type: Church
- Status: Listed
- ID: 83835

Bakka Church (Norwegian: Bakka kyrkje) is a parish church of the Church of Norway in Aurland Municipality in Vestland county, Norway. It is located in the village of Bakka, on the shores of the sparsely populated Nærøyfjorden. It is the church for the Nærøy parish which is part of the Sogn prosti (deanery) in the Diocese of Bjørgvin. The white, wooden church was built in a long church design in 1859 using plans drawn up by the architect Christian Henrik Grosch. The church seats about 200 people.

The church is a small, simple building with a 13.5-by-7-metre (44 ft × 23 ft) nave and a 4.4-by-7-metre (14 ft × 23 ft) choir. A 1.7-by-3.4-metre (5 ft 7 in × 11 ft 2 in) chancel contains the altarpiece. Due to its rural, isolated location, the Nærøy parish is one of the smallest parishes in the Diocese of Bjørgvin with only 104 members in 1999. In a normal year, there are about one or two baptisms and about the same number of confirmands.

== History ==
The people living along the Nærøyfjord and in the surrounding valley had desired a local church for a long time, to avoid the long journey to the Undredal Stave Church. In the 1820s and 1830s, there was talk of relocating the old stave church to be closer to the population of the parish, but nothing was done. In 1851, the new church law required larger churches for many parishes. At that time new plans were made to divide the parish and build a new church along the Nærøyfjorden in the village of Bakka. The new church was designed by Christian Henrik Grosch and the lead builders were Ole O. Løen and Rasmus Nøstdal from Eid. The new church was consecrated on 11 May 1859.

== Media gallery ==
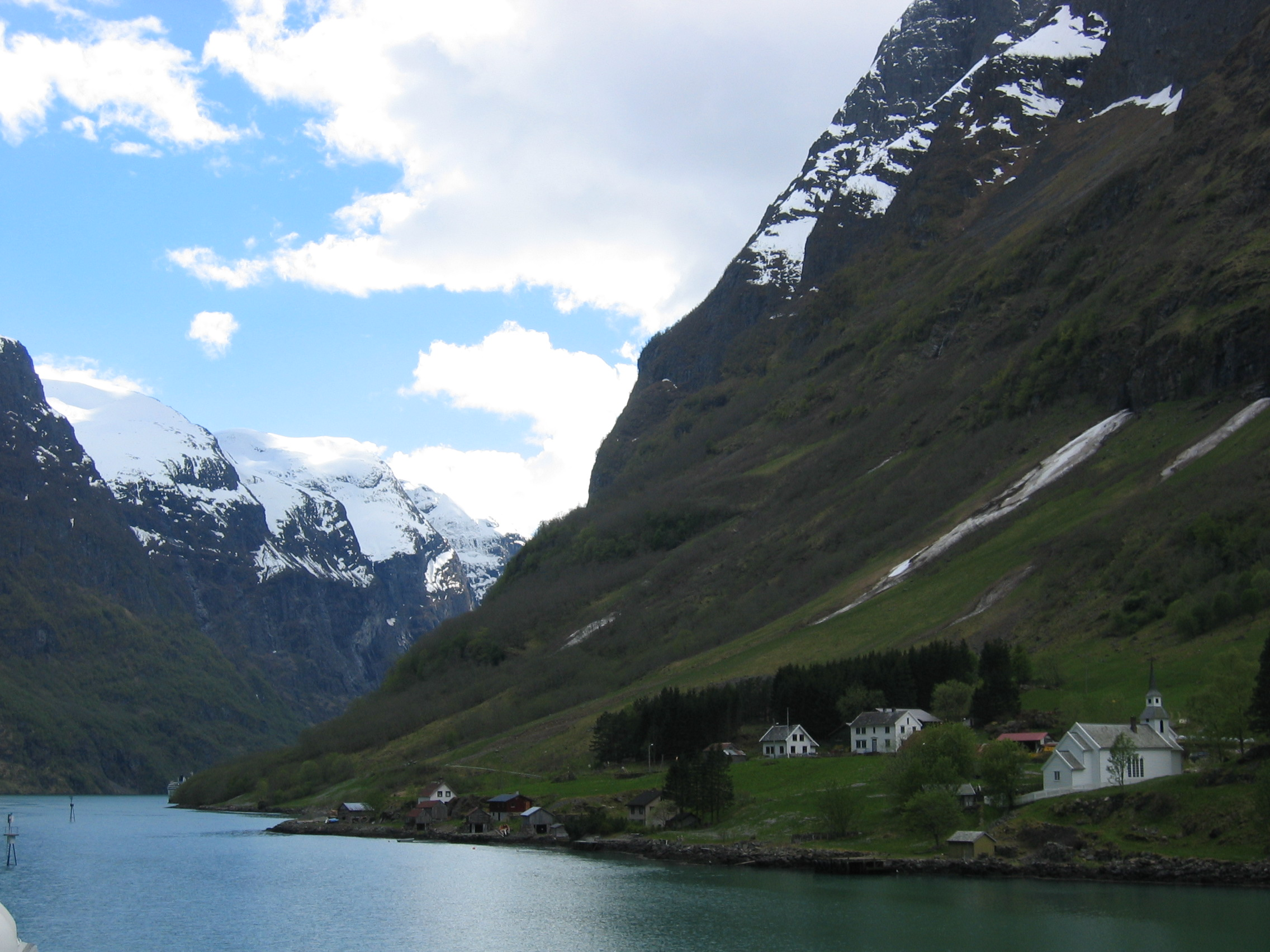
View of the church on the shore of the Nærøyfjorden

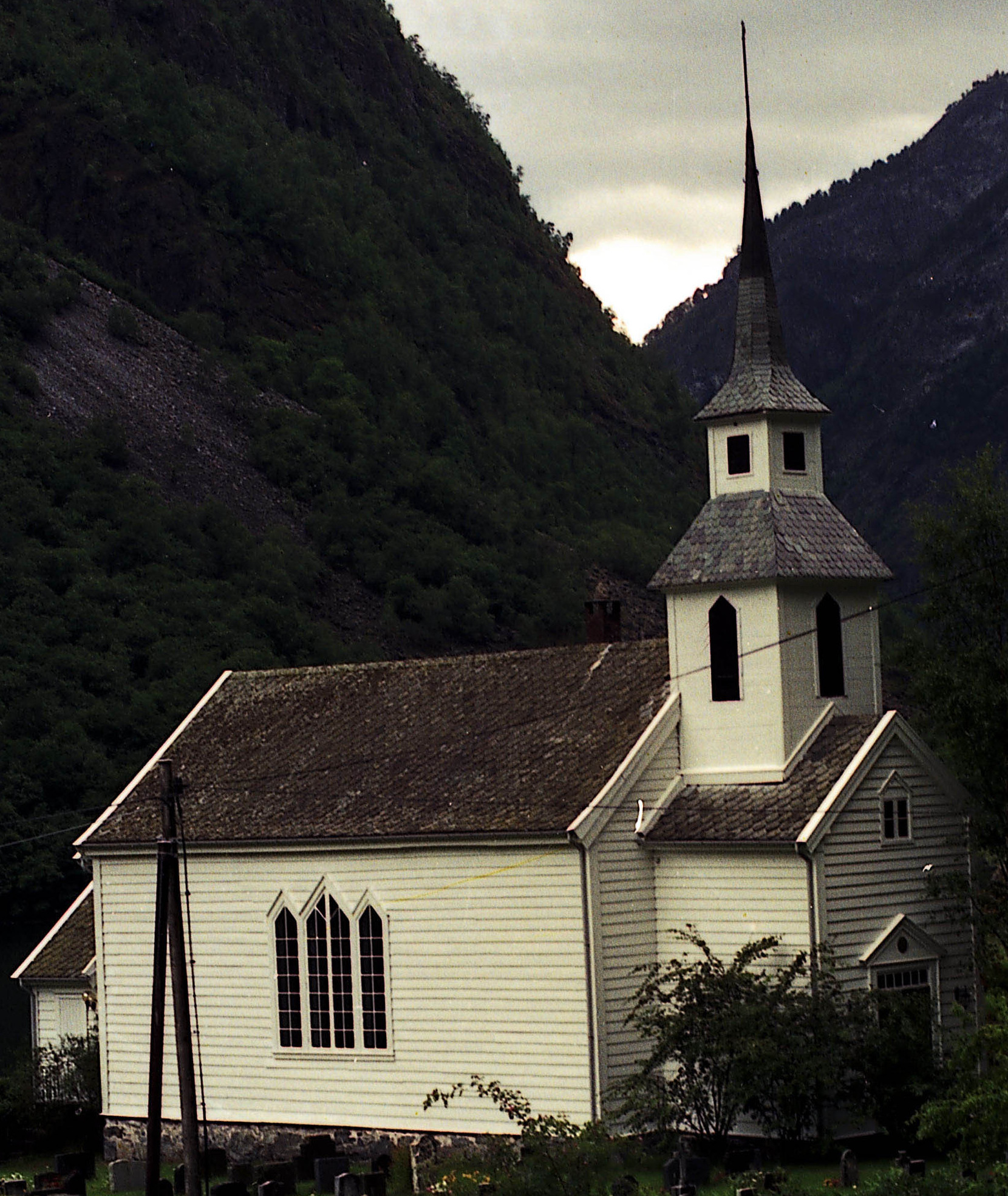
Exterior view of the church

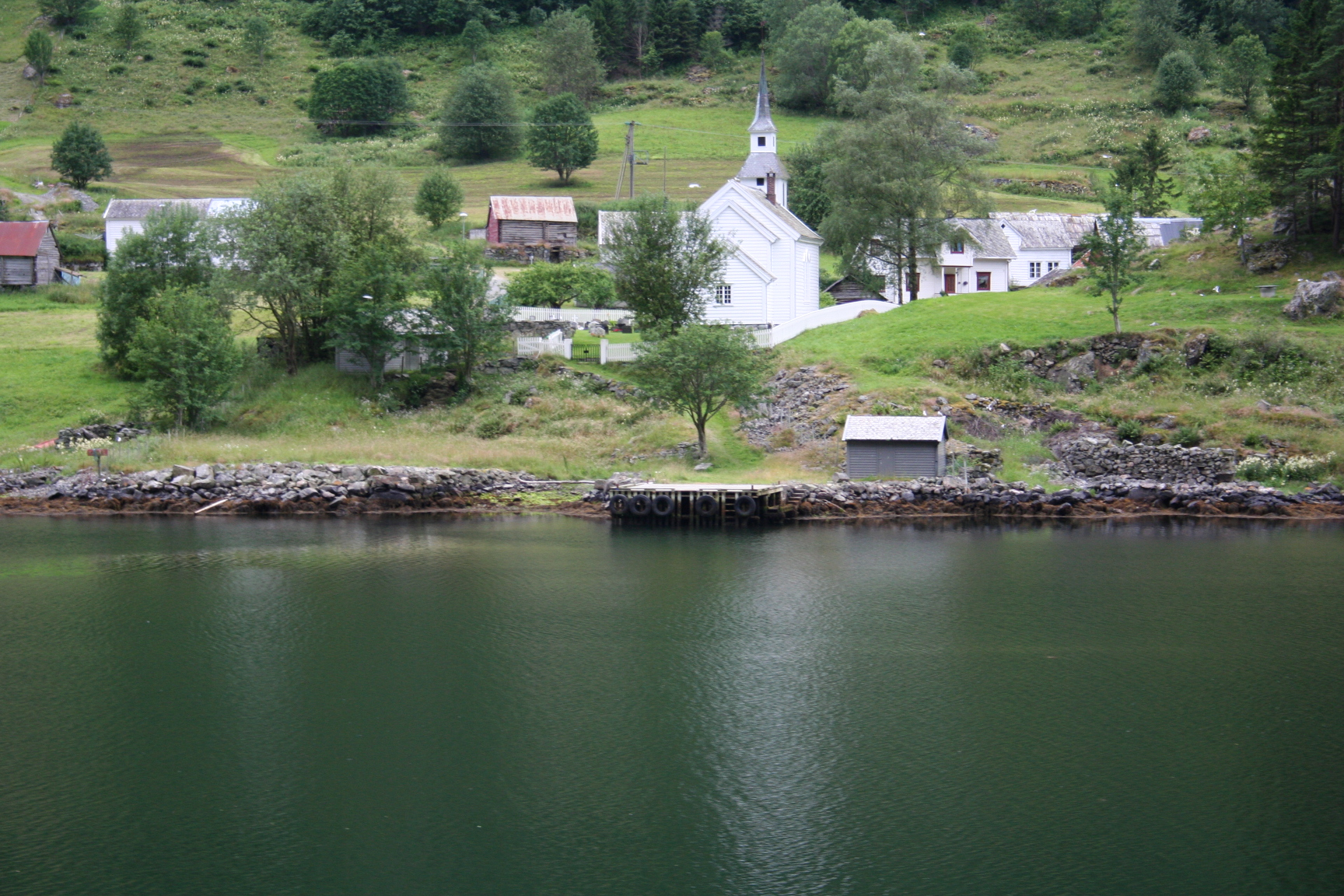
Exterior view, seen from the fjord

== See also ==
- List of churches in Bjørgvin
