= Undredal =

Village in Aurland Municipality, Norway

- Village
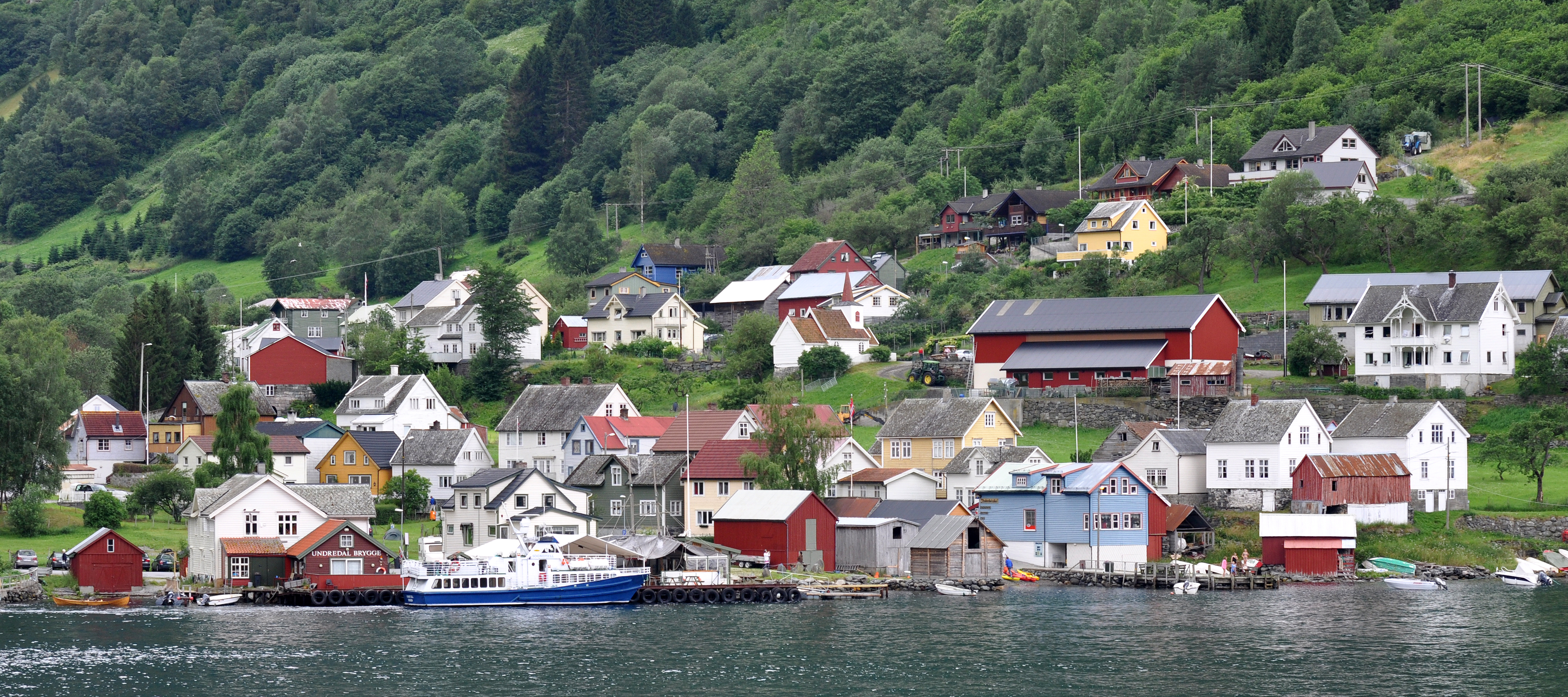
- View of Undredal
- Interactive map of Undredal
- Location within Vestland Location within Norway
- Coordinates: 60.9501°N 7.1019°E
- Country: Norway
- Region: Western Norway
- County: Vestland
- District: Sogn
- Municipality: Aurland Municipality
- Elevation: 20 m (66 ft)

Population (2001)
  - Total: 112
- Time zone: UTC+01:00 (CET)
  - Summer (DST): UTC+02:00 (CEST)
- Post Code: 5746 Undredal

Undredal is a small village in Aurland Municipality in Vestland county, Norway. The popular tourist destination of Undredal is located along the Aurlandsfjorden which is a branch off the massive Sognefjorden in Norway's "fjord-country." It sits along the Aurlandsfjorden, about 5 kilometres (3.1 mi) south of the mouth to the Nærøyfjord. Undredal is home to the smallest stave church in Northern Europe, Undredal Stave Church. This little village was mentioned in Rick Steves' show about Norway.

== Economy ==
With a population of approximately 100 people and 500 goats, Undredal is famous for the brown goat cheese (geitost) that is still produced the traditional way. The production of cheese is important to the local economy as eight farms produce 10 to 12 short tons (9,100 to 10,900 kg) of cheese each year. Goat sausage is also produced locally.

== History ==
Historically, Undredal was first mentioned when the Bishop of the Diocese of Bjørgvin (Bergen) placed Pål Bårdson, a known scholar, there as a representative of the church. Pål Bårdson was the Chancellor to the court of King Magnus, and he later was the Archbishop of Nidaros (Trondheim) from 1333 until 1346. The Undredal Stave Church can be dated back to 1147.

=== Access ===
Prior to 1988, Undredal was only accessible by boat, but since then a road connection has been made by constructing two lengthy tunnels as part of the European route E16 highway. The Gudvanga Tunnel leads southwest to the village of Gudvangen and the Flenja Tunnel goes to the villages of Flåm and Aurlandsvangen to the northeast. There is a brief 700-metre (2,300 ft) long length of road between the tunnels that has an access road to Undredal 6.5 kilometres (4.0 mi) to the north.

== Media gallery ==
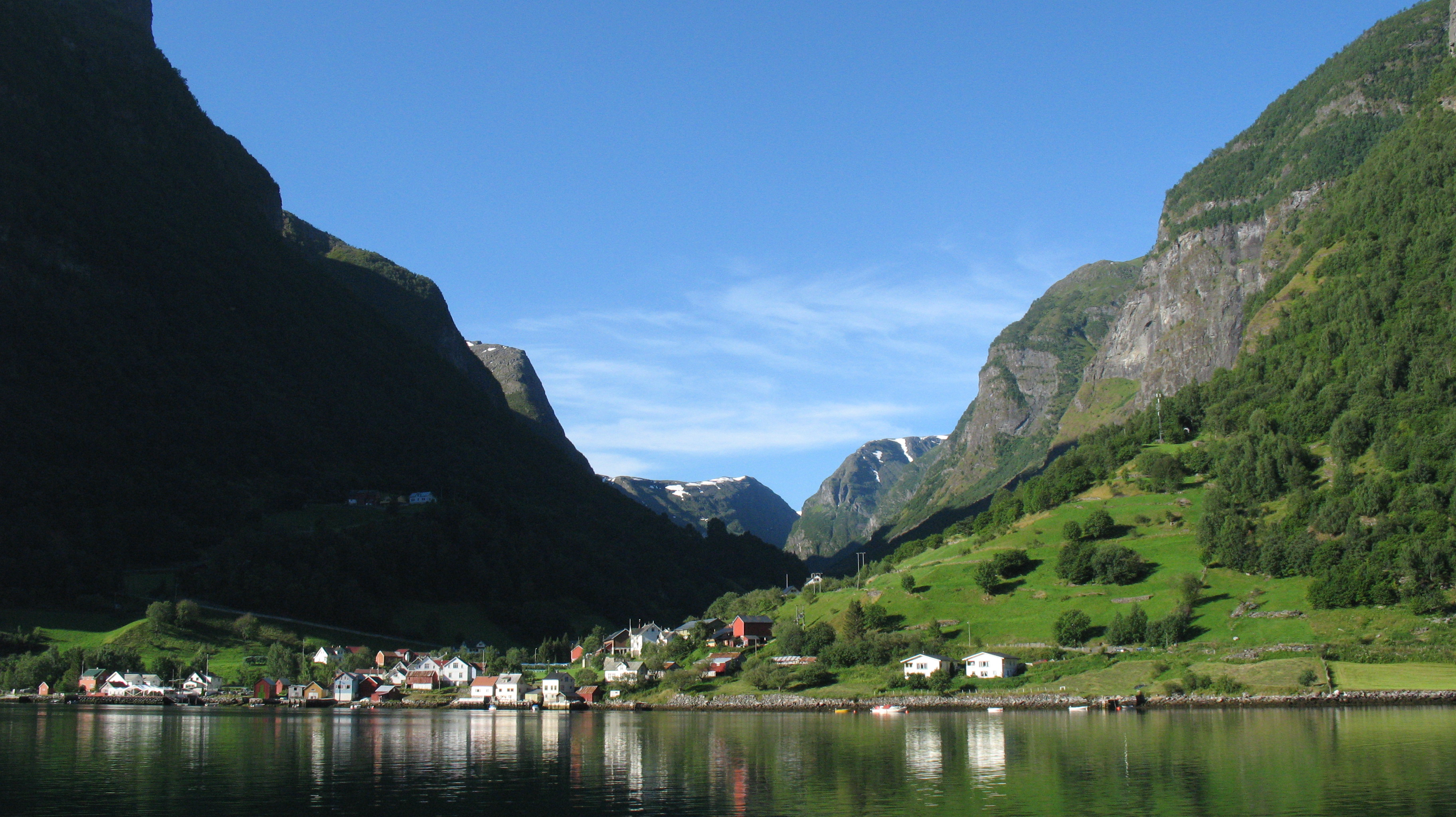
Undredal

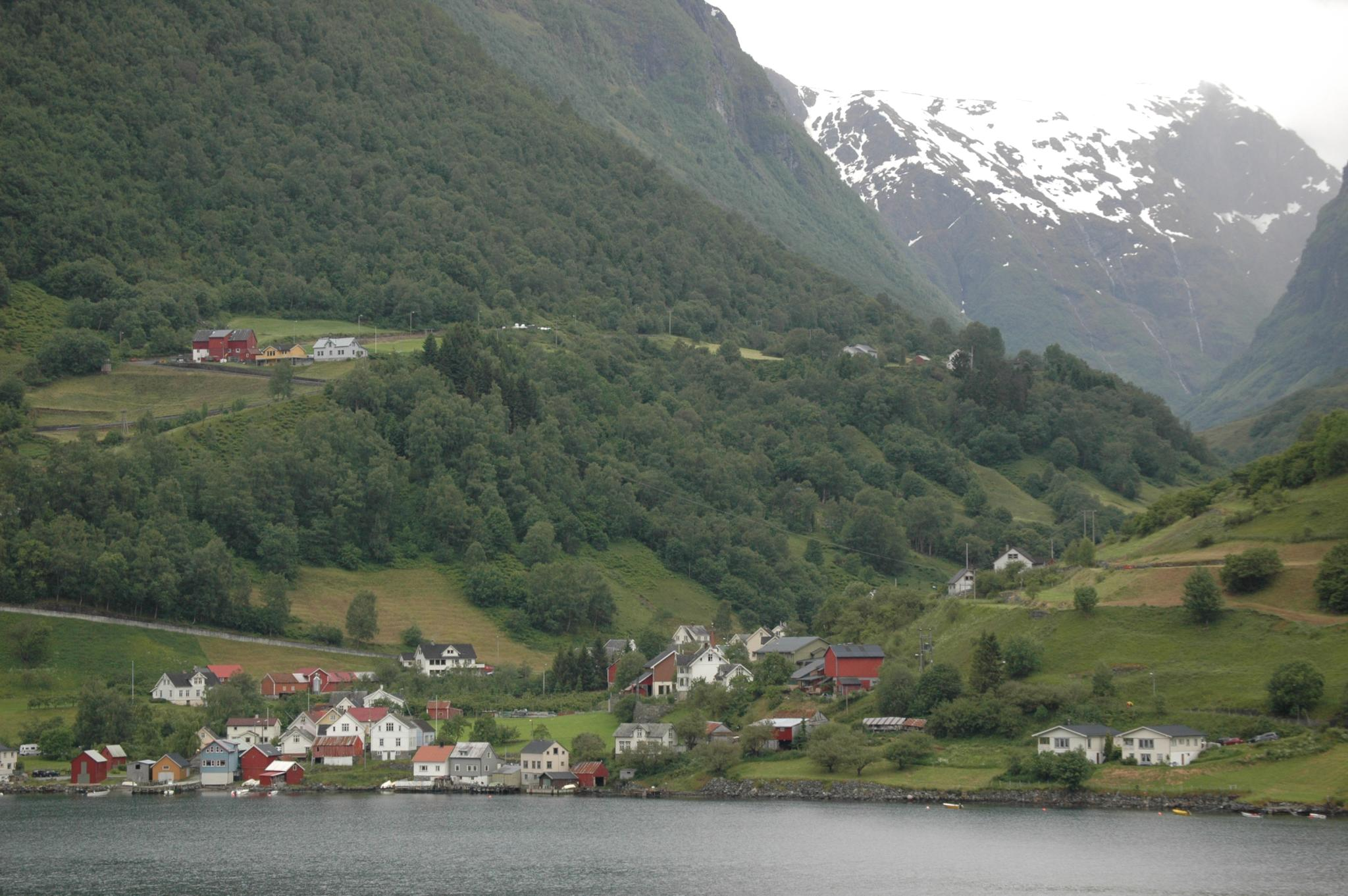
View of Undredal

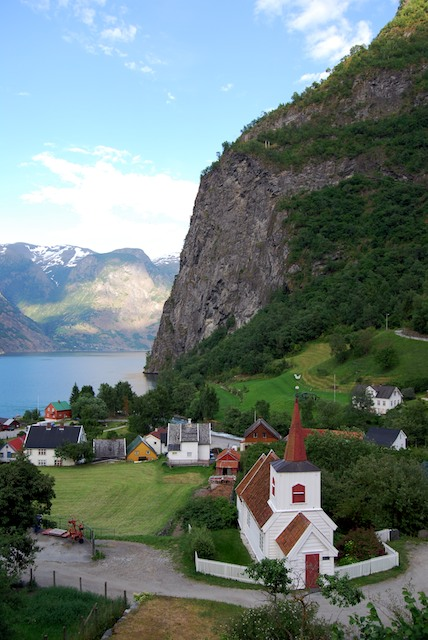
Undredal stave church

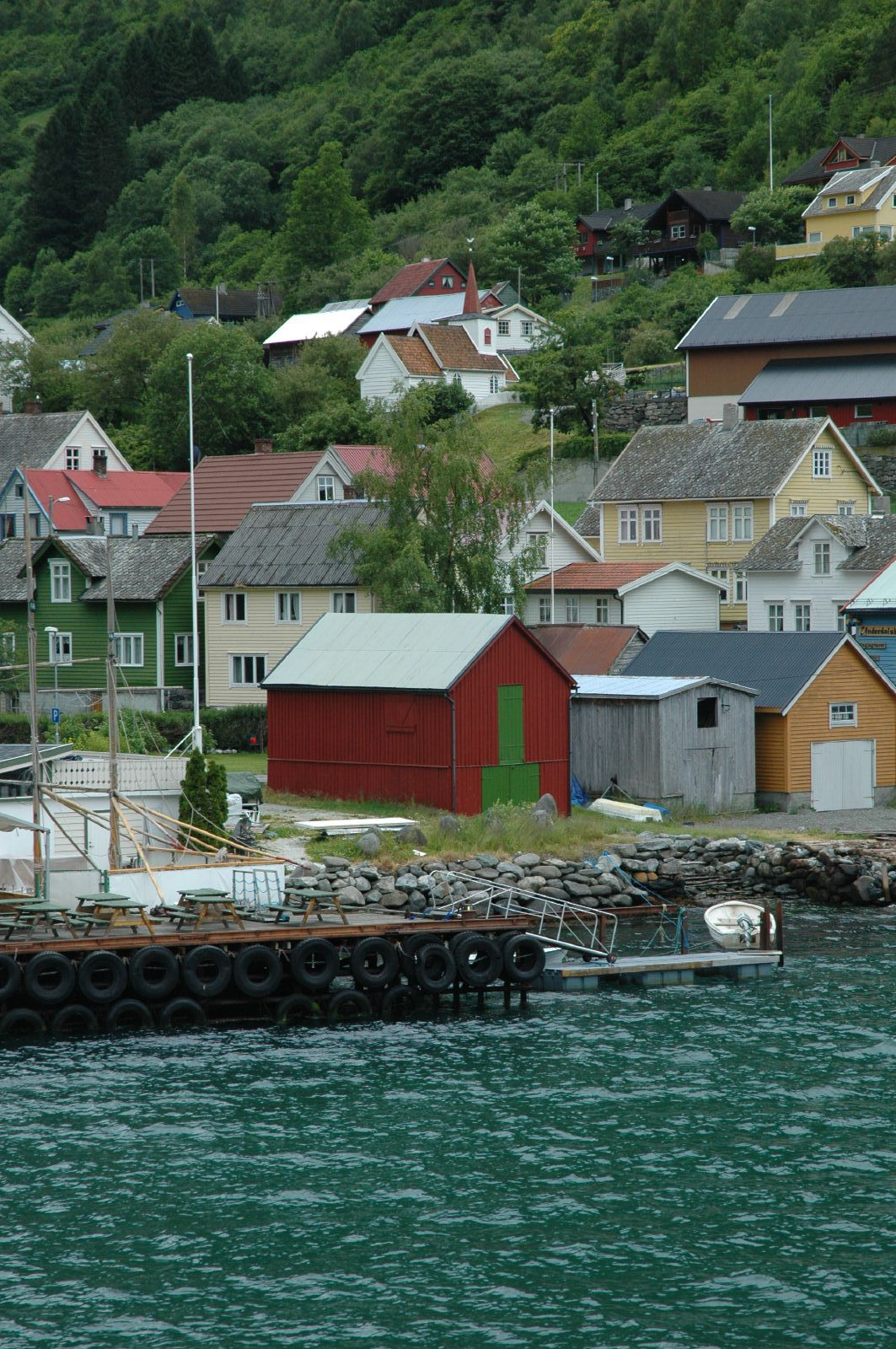
Undredal with church in background
