= Vangen Church (Aurland) =

Church in Vestland, Norway

- Vangen kyrkje
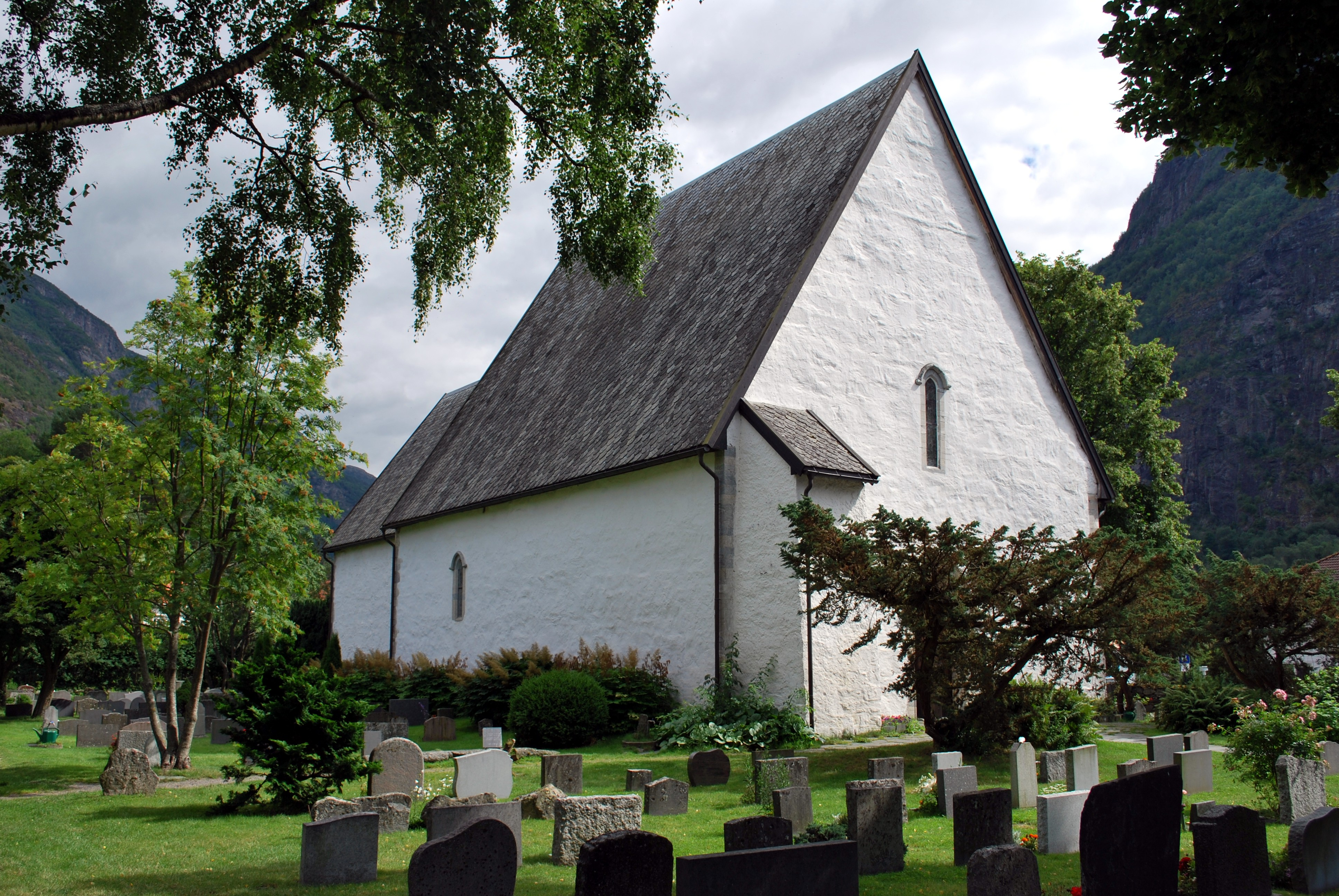
- View of the church
- Vangen Church
- 60°54′21″N 7°11′17″E
- Location: Aurland Municipality, Vestland
- Country: Norway
- Denomination: Church of Norway
- Previous denomination: Catholic Church
- Churchmanship: Evangelical Lutheran

History
- Status: Parish church
- Founded: c. 1202
- Consecrated: 2 May 1202

Architecture
- Functional status: Active
- Architectural type: Long church
- Style: Gothic style
- Completed: 1202 (824 years ago)

Specifications
- Capacity: 270
- Materials: Stone

Administration
- Diocese: Bjørgvin bispedømme
- Deanery: Sogn prosti
- Parish: Vangen
- Norwegian Cultural Heritage Site
- Type: Church
- Status: Automatically protected
- ID: 83816

Vangen Church (Norwegian: Vangen kyrkje) is the main parish church in Aurland Municipality in Vestland county, Norway. It is located in the village of Aurlandsvangen, at the end of the Aurlandsfjorden. It is the church for the Vangen parish which is part of the Sogn prosti (deanery) in the Diocese of Bjørgvin. The white, stone church was built in a long church design and in early Gothic style around the year 1202. The church seats about 270 people.

Vangen Church is the largest of the seven medieval stone churches in the Sogn og Fjordane region, leading it to be called the Sognedomen or Sogn Cathedral.

== History ==
The church probably built in two stages in the 13th century which the chancel built first and the nave built slightly later. There is a foundation stone in the church on which the date 2 May 1202 is inscribed, and a letter (now lost) that was once found in the church stated that the church was consecrated on 2 May 1202. A local historian, Anders Ohnstad, has stated that King Sverre had local ties to Aurland and he died in March 1202, so the church may have been constructed on his orders.

The church has a rectangular nave measuring about 18 by 13 metres (59 ft × 43 ft) and a smaller, narrower choir measuring about 10.4 by 9.6 metres (34 ft × 31 ft). It does not have a sacristy, porch, or tower. The stone walls of the church are all 6 metres (20 ft) high and are also about 1.3 to 1.6 metres (4 ft 3 in to 5 ft 3 in) thick. The ceiling of the church reaches 18 metres (59 ft) high at the highest point. The church has a hexagonal pulpit from the early 17th century. It is decorated with painted tulips, brass ornaments, and pilasters in green, yellow and red against a pale yellow background.

In 1814, this church served as an election church (Norwegian: valgkirke). Together with more than 300 other parish churches across Norway, it was a polling station for elections to the 1814 Norwegian Constituent Assembly which wrote the Constitution of Norway. This was Norway's first national elections. Each church parish was a constituency that elected people called "electors" who later met together in each county to elect the representatives for the assembly that was to meet at Eidsvoll Manor later that year.

The church was restored both in 1861–1862. In 1926, the church was restored again, this time the old wooden church porch was removed to bring it back to its historic exterior design.

== Media gallery ==
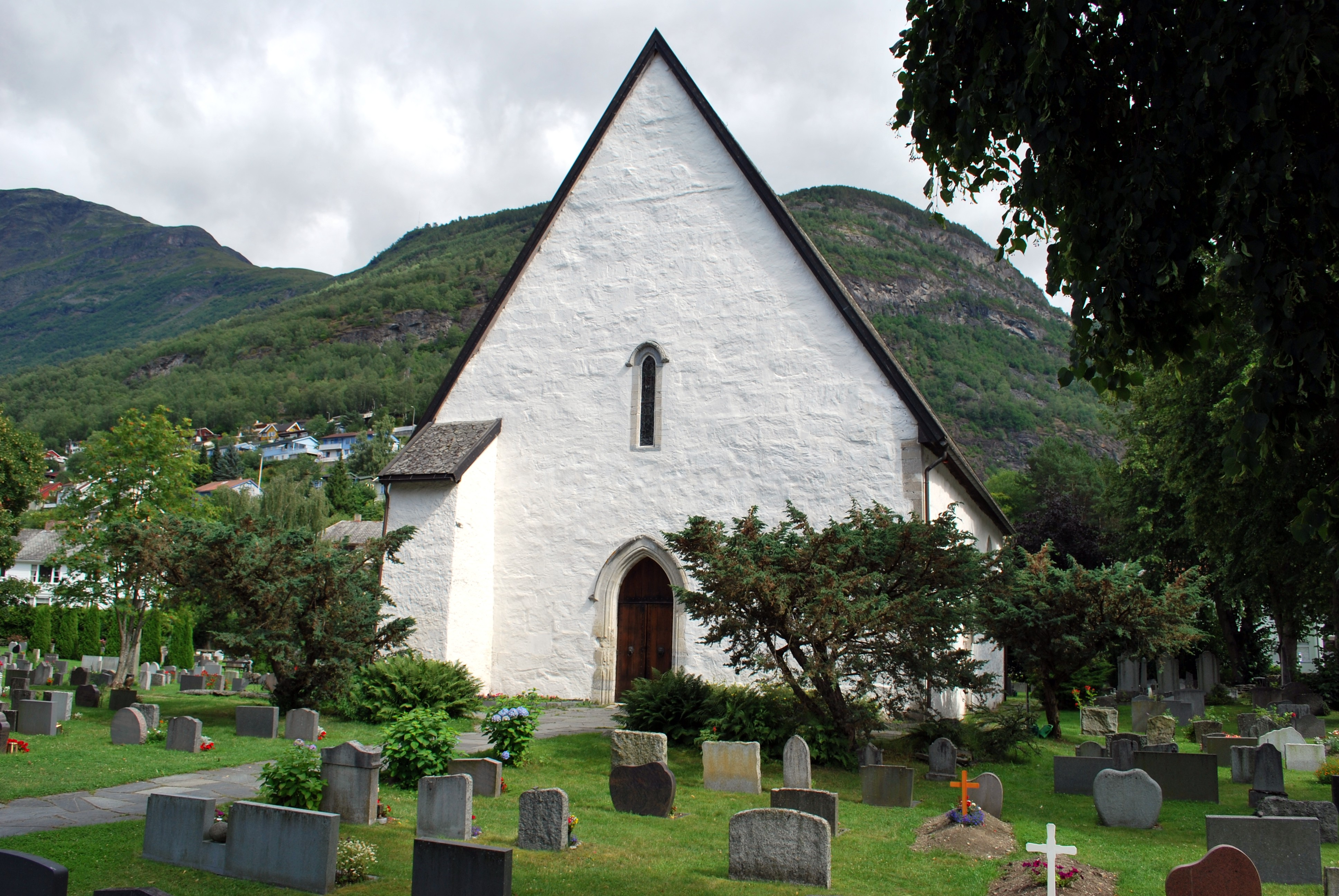
Exterior view of the main entrance

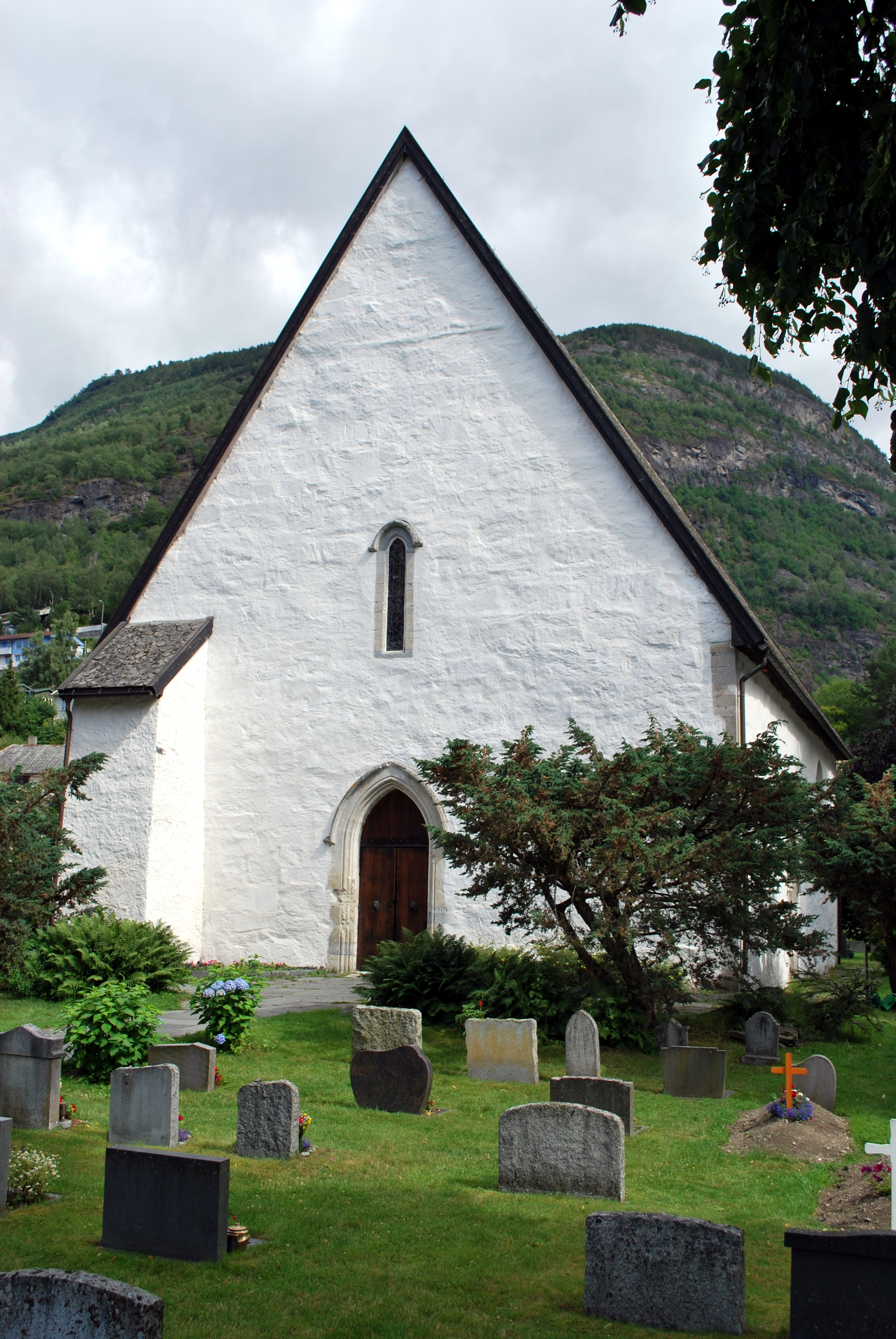

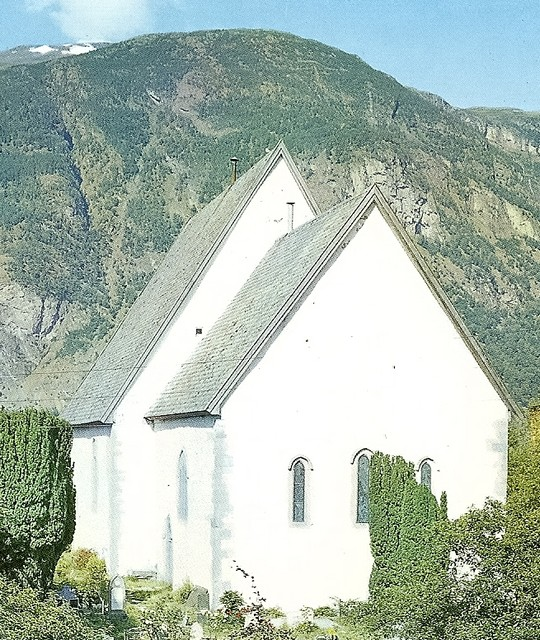

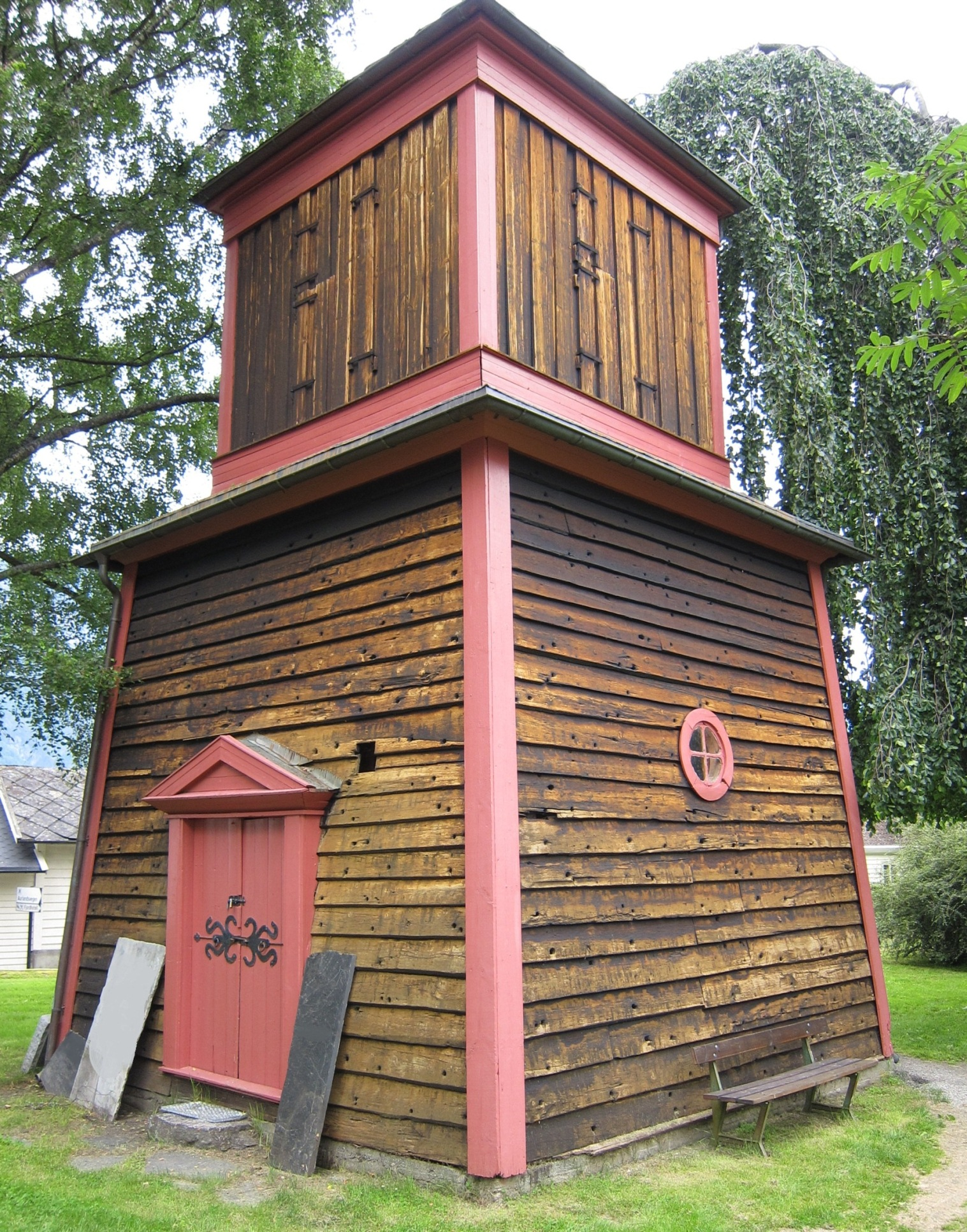
Free-standing bell tower near the church

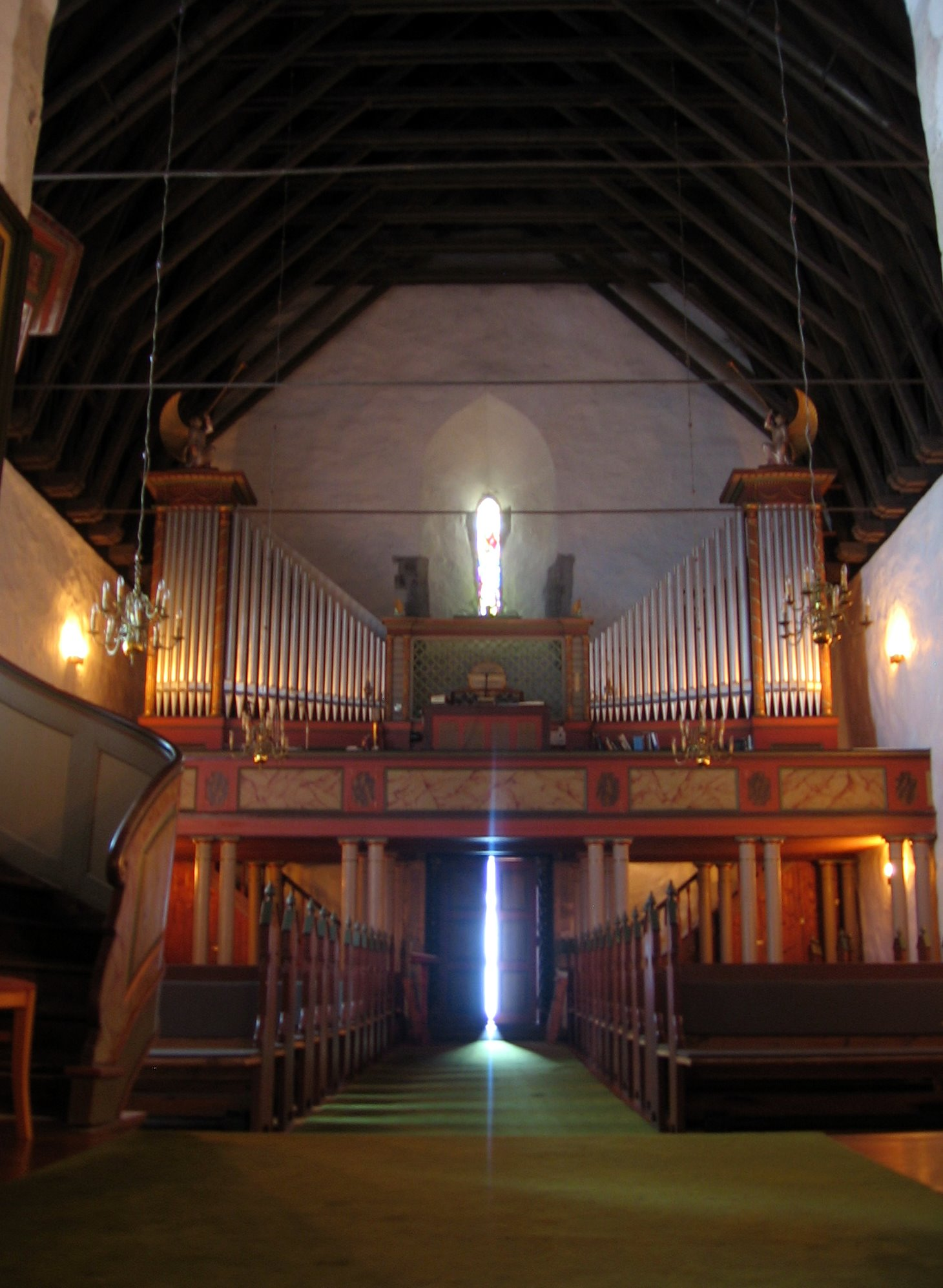
Interior view of the seating area

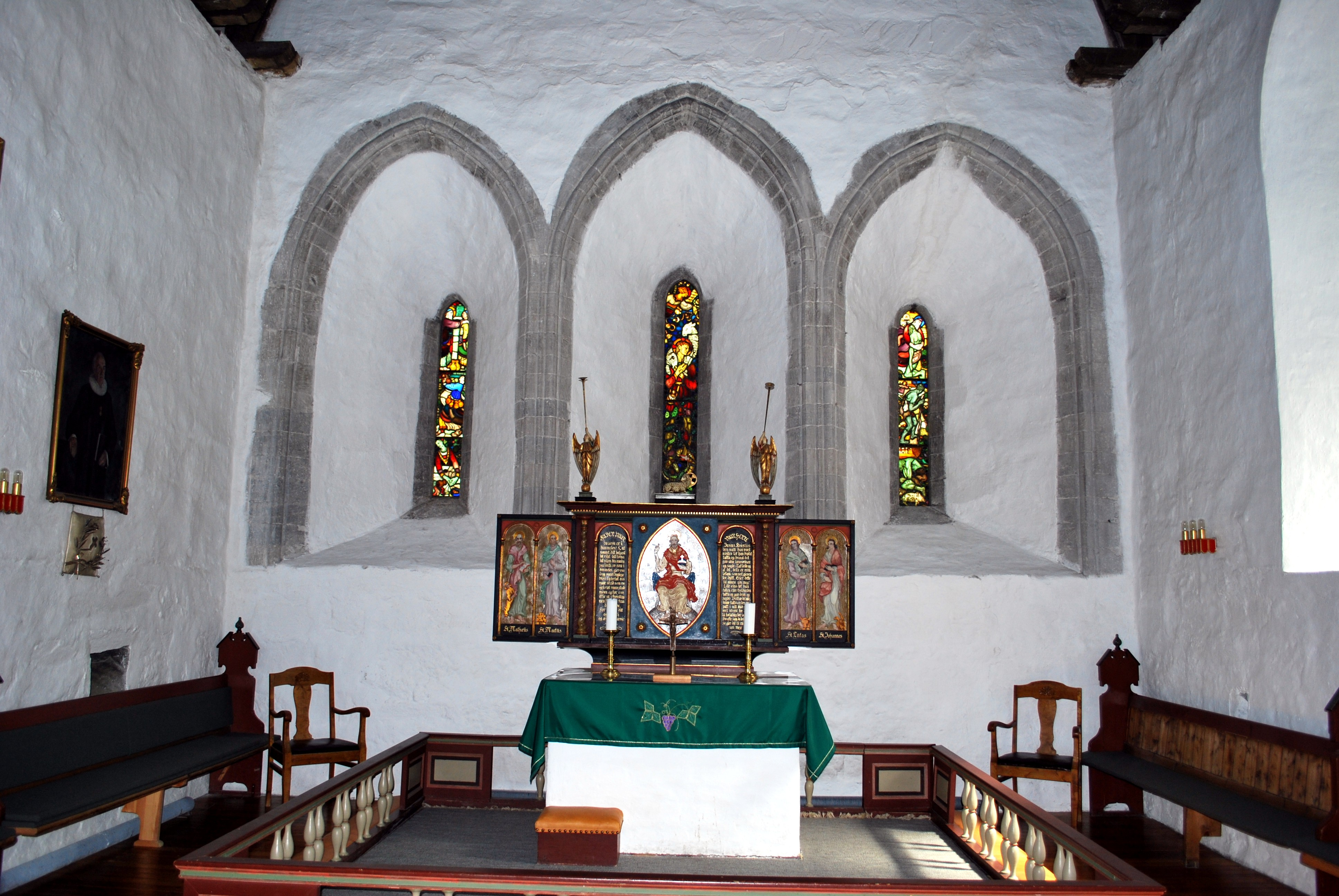
Interior front view

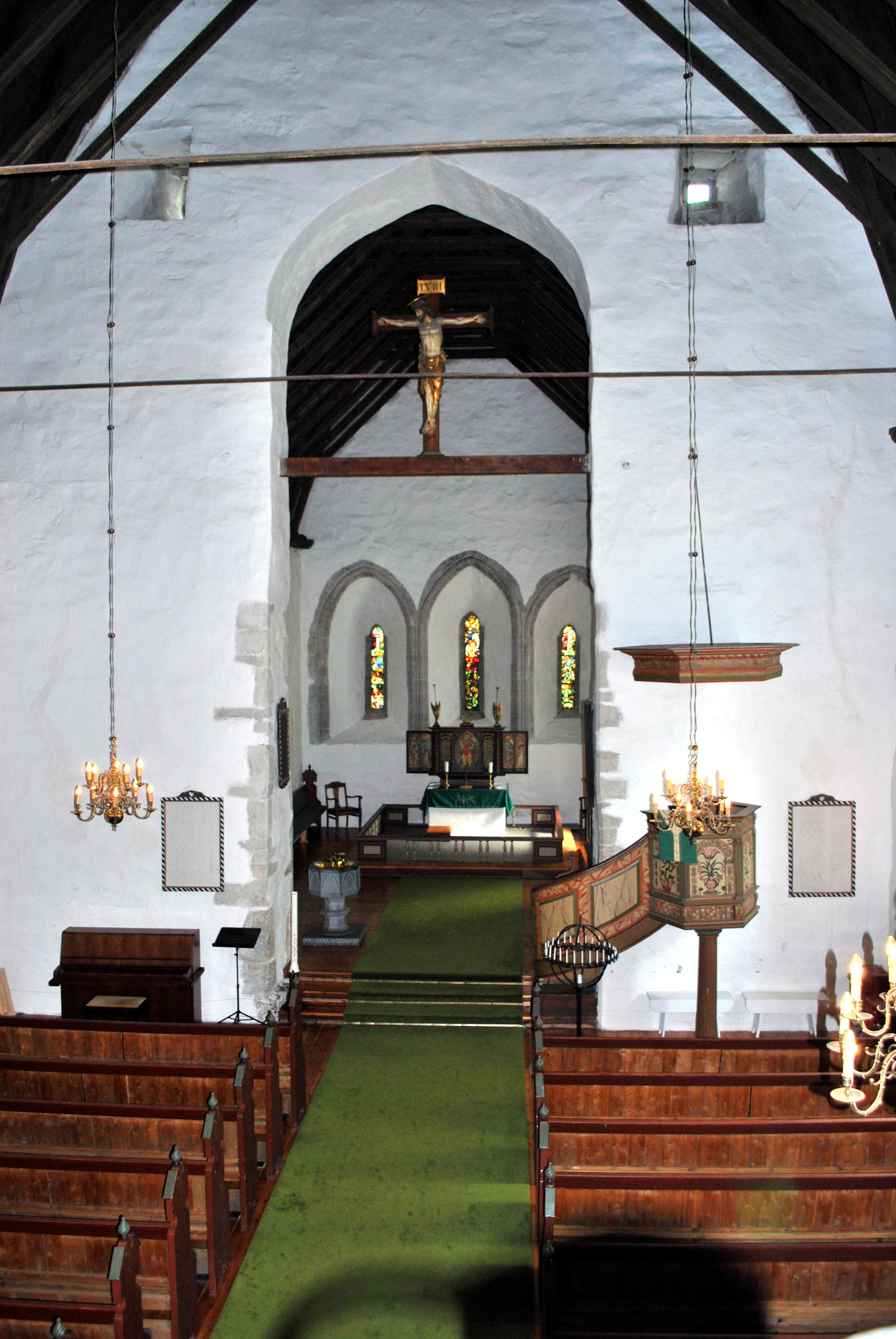

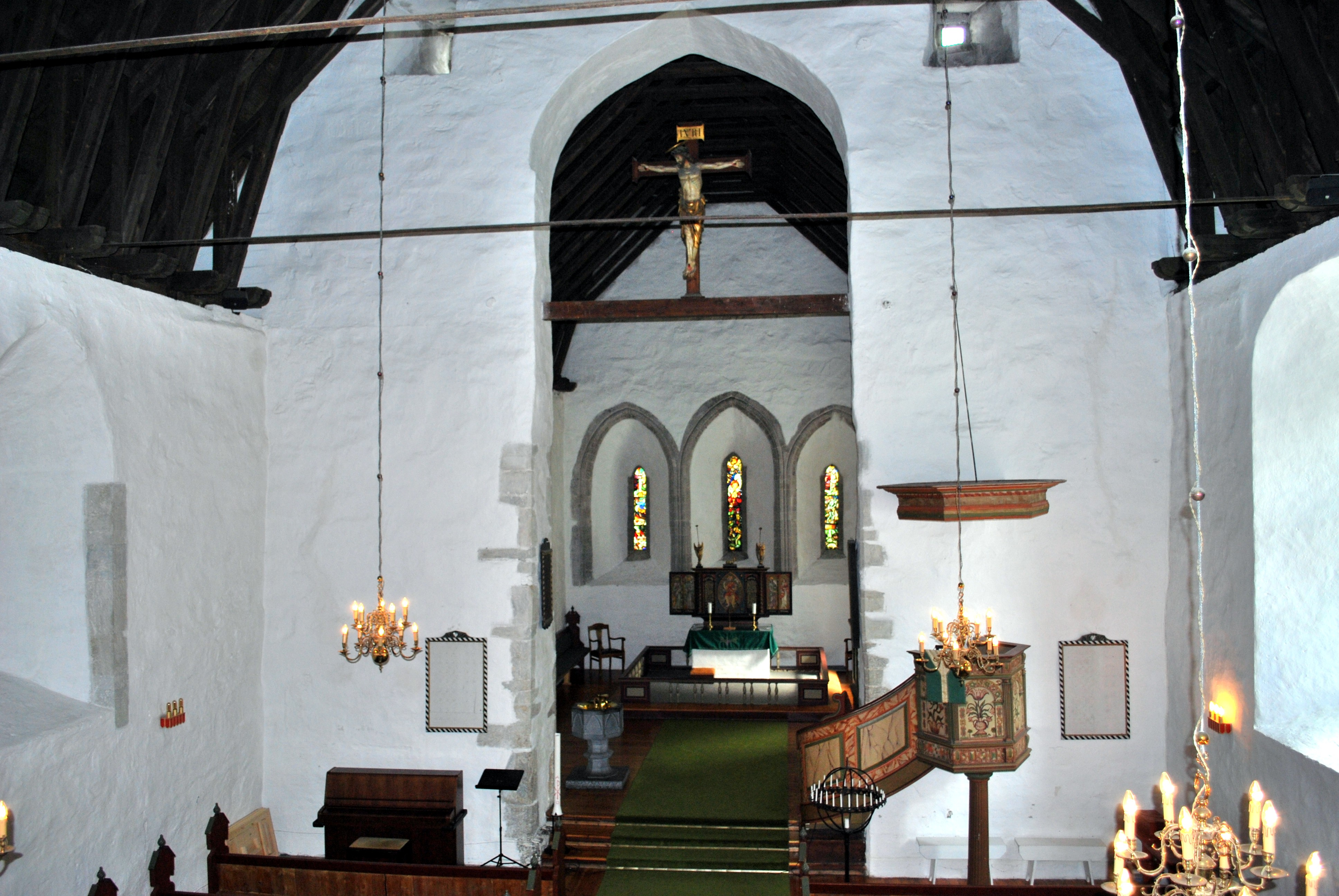

== See also ==
- List of churches in Bjørgvin
