= Bakka, Aurland =

Village in Aurland Municipality, Norway

Bakka
- Village
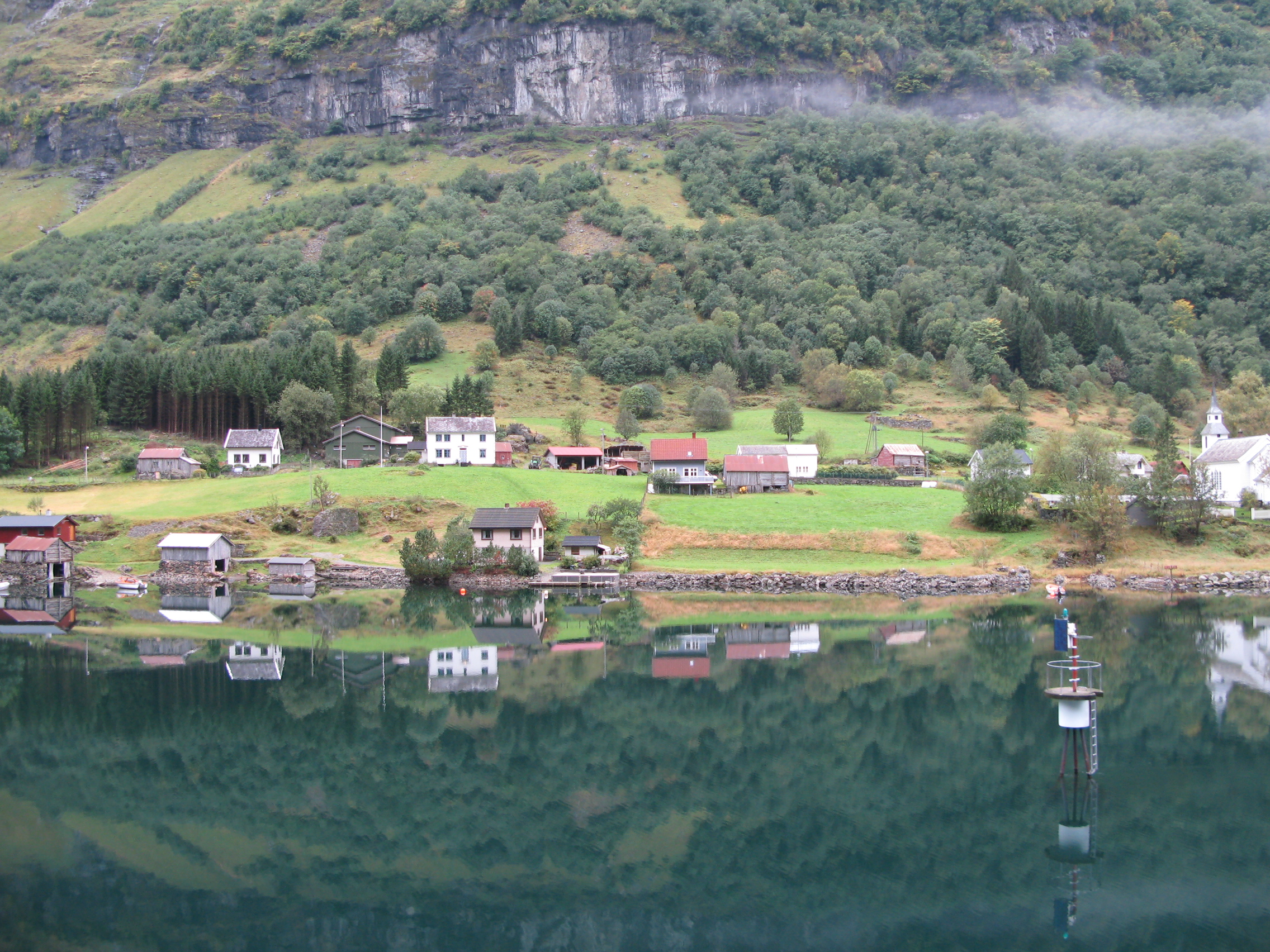
- View from the fjord
- Interactive map of Bakka
- Location within Vestland Location within Norway
- Coordinates: 60.9163°N 6.8689°E
- Country: Norway
- Region: Western Norway
- County: Vestland
- District: Sogn
- Municipality: Aurland Municipality
- Elevation: 18 m (59 ft)
- Time zone: UTC+01:00 (CET)
  - Summer (DST): UTC+02:00 (CEST)
- Post Code: 5749 Bakka

Bakka is a tiny village in Aurland Municipality in Vestland county, Norway. It is located on the western shore of the Nærøyfjord, about 5 kilometres (3.1 mi) north of the village of Gudvangen and access to the European route E16 highway. The village is home to the Bakka Church. In 2000, the 1.7-kilometre (1.1 mi) Bakka Tunnel was constructed on the road from Gudvangen to Bakka to make the journey quicker and safer.

== Name ==
The name Bakka is derived from the Old Norse word bakki which means "(river) bank". The -a ending is the dative case ending used with prepositions to show location: "on the bank". In the 19th century, it was common to spell the name Bakke.

== Media gallery ==
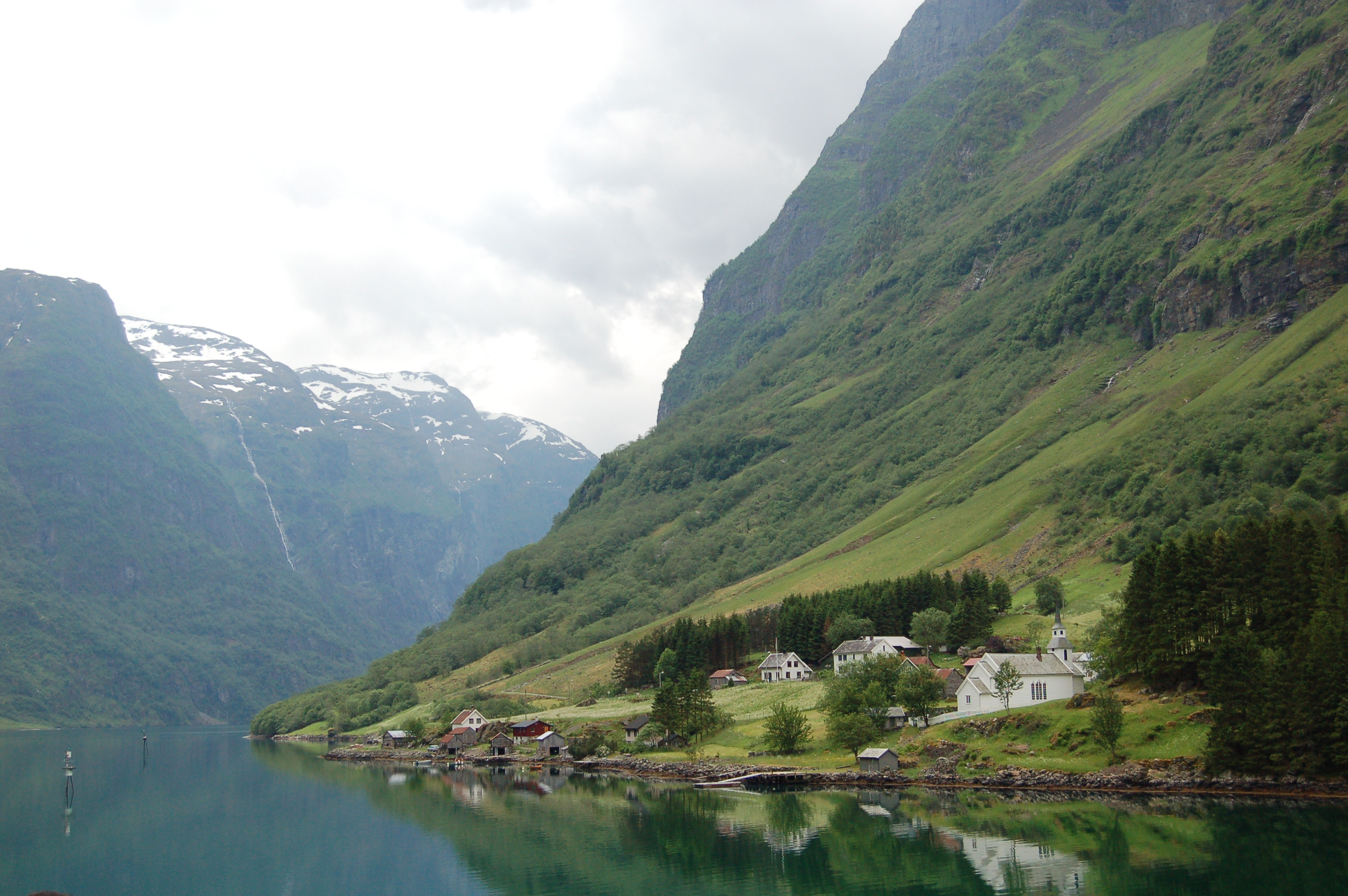
View of Bakka

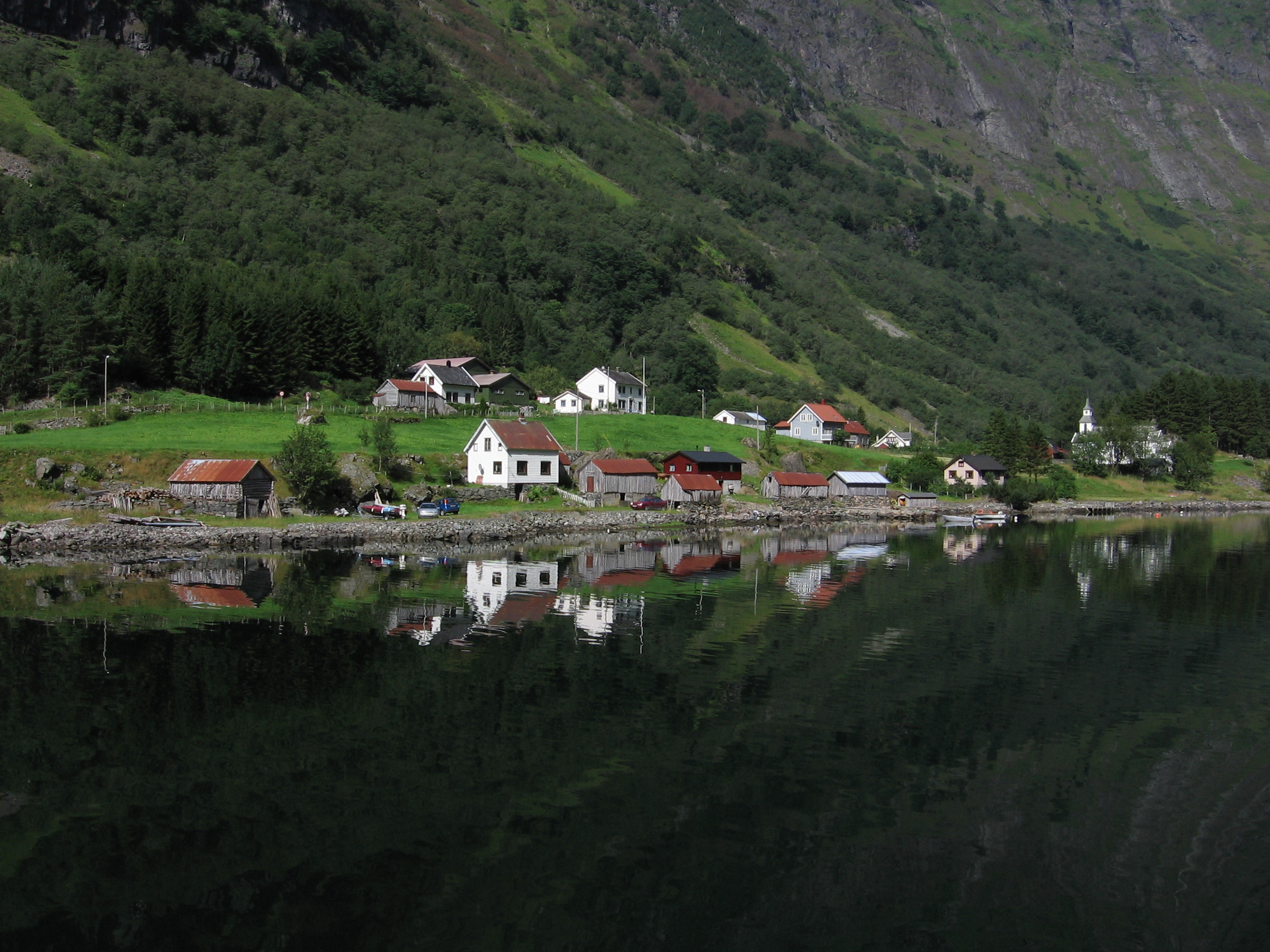
Bakka

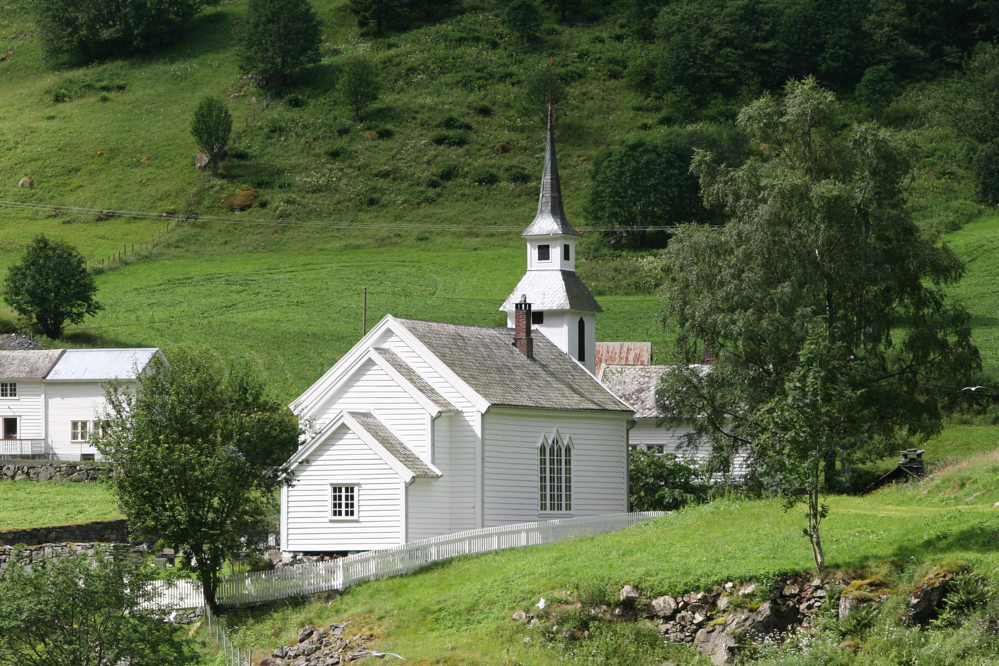
Bakka Church

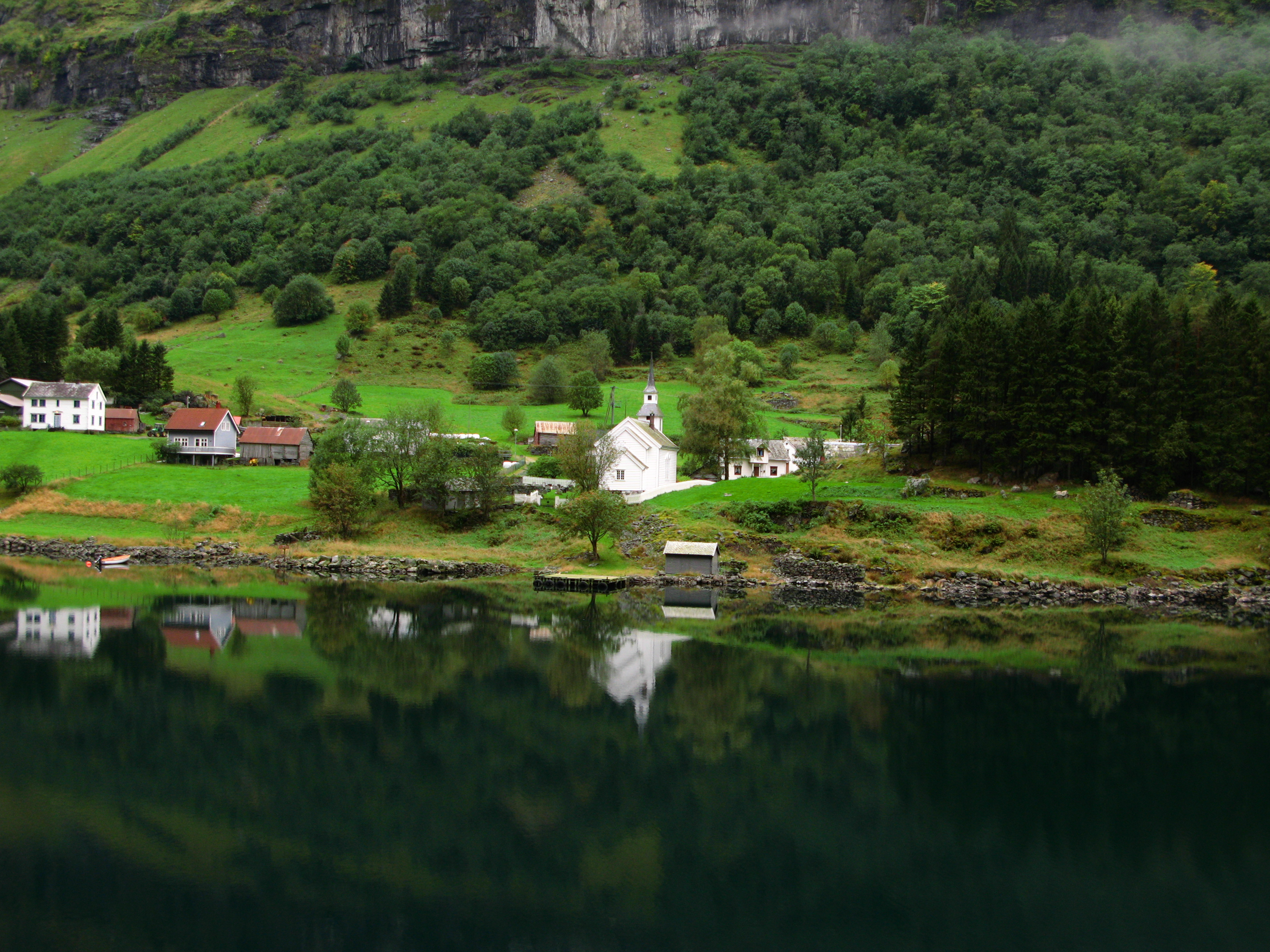
Village and church

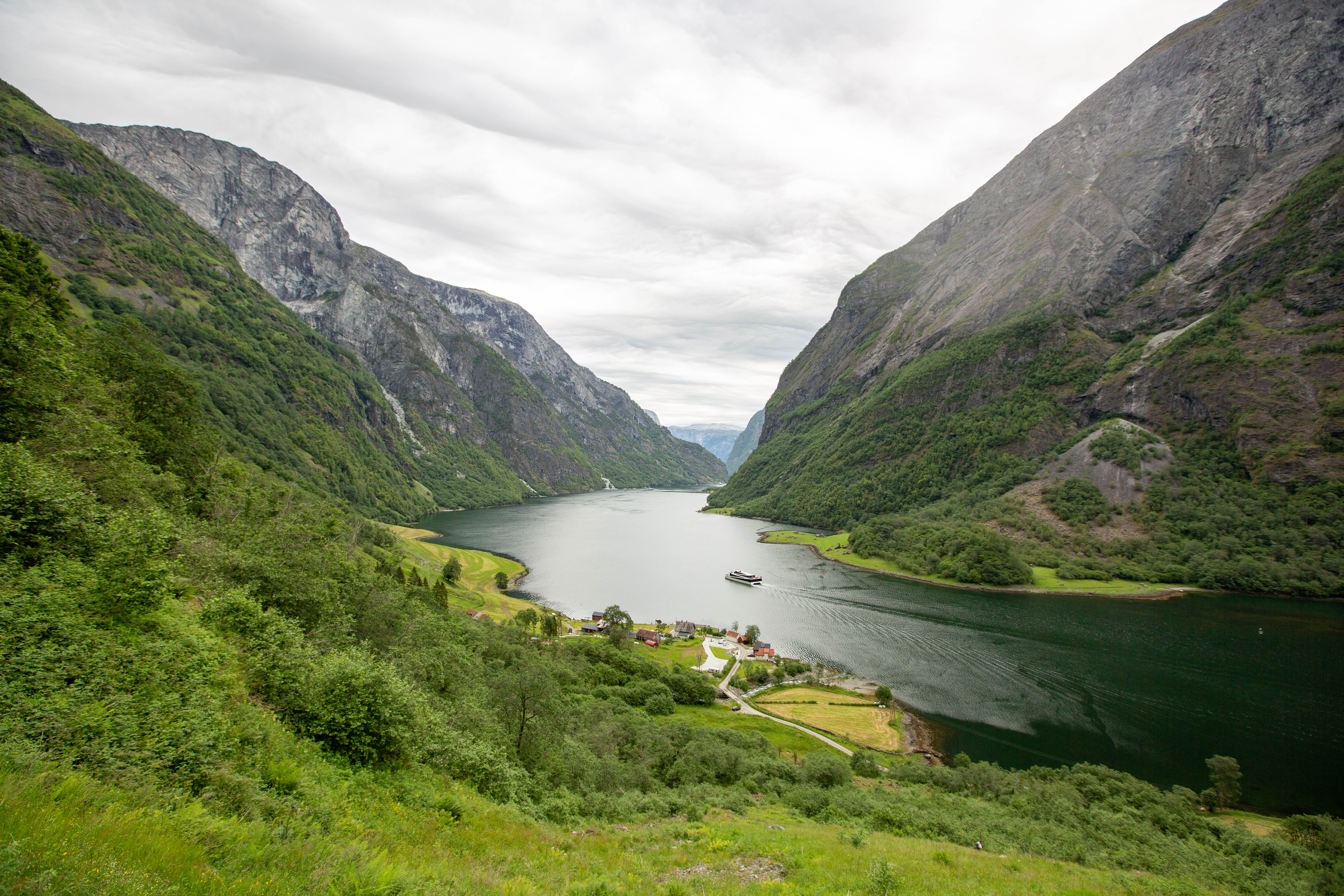
Overview of Bakka and Nærøyfjord
