= Undredal Stave Church =

Stave church in Vestland, Norway

- Undredal stavkyrkje
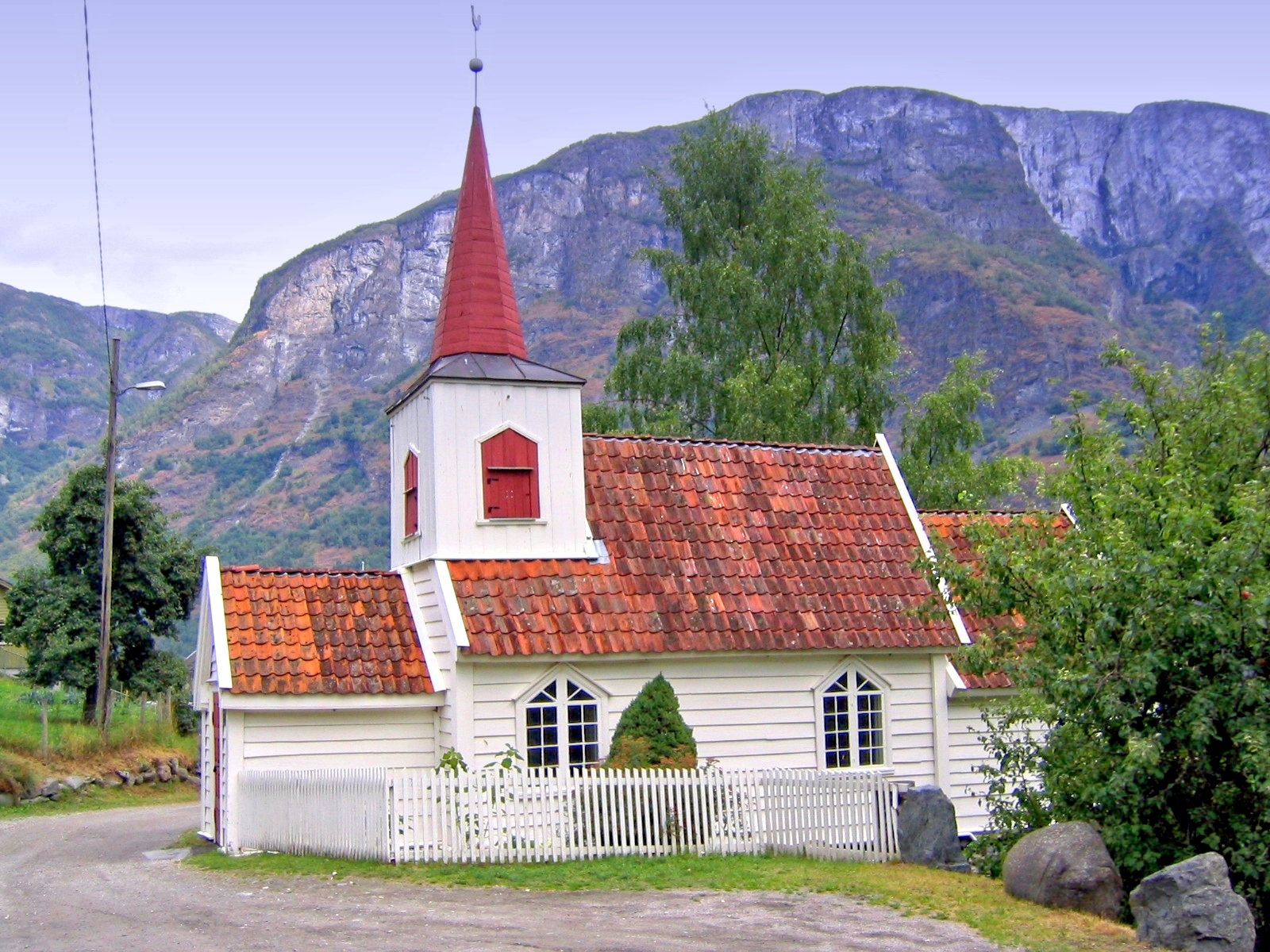
- View of the church
- Undredal Stave Church
- 60°57′03″N 7°06′08″E
- Location: Aurland Municipality, Vestland
- Country: Norway
- Denomination: Church of Norway
- Previous denomination: Catholic Church
- Churchmanship: Evangelical Lutheran

History
- Status: Parish church
- Founded: c. 1147
- Consecrated: c. 1147

Architecture
- Functional status: Active
- Architectural type: Stave church
- Completed: c. 1147 (879 years ago)

Specifications
- Capacity: 40
- Materials: Wood

Administration
- Diocese: Bjørgvin bispedømme
- Deanery: Sogn prosti
- Parish: Undredal
- Norwegian Cultural Heritage Site
- Type: Church
- Status: Automatically protected
- ID: 85725

Undredal Stave Church (Norwegian: Undredal stavkyrkje) is a parish church of the Church of Norway in Aurland Municipality in Vestland county, Norway. It is located in the village of Undredal, on the shore of the Aurlandsfjorden. It is the church for the Undredal parish which is part of the Sogn prosti (deanery) in the Diocese of Bjørgvin. The white, wooden church was built in a stave church style around the year 1147.

The church is only 12 by 4 metres (39 by 13 ft) and has only 40 seats, making it the smallest stave church still in use in all of Scandinavia. The parish only includes one small, rather isolated valley, with only 116 parishioners, making it the second smallest parish in the Diocese of Bjørgvin.

== History ==
Undredal Stave Church was built in the middle of the 12th century, possibly from the year 1147, but very likely from the mid- to late-1100s. There is some evidence that the church was taken apart and moved during the Middle Ages, but this is not known for sure. The original part of the church includes roughly the eastern 2/3rds of the present building. The original church had a 5.6-by-4.7-metre (18 ft × 15 ft) nave and a 2.3 by 2.3 metres (7 ft 7 in × 7 ft 7 in) chancel. Around the year 1600, the choir was rebuilt and enlarged, measuring about 4.7 by 4.7 metres (15 ft × 15 ft) after its completion. Originally, the church had a covered corridor that ran around the exterior of the church (as seen in many stave churches). This corridor was removed around 1685 and windows were installed in the walls of the nave. Around 1850, the building was extended to the west by lengthening the nave by about 2 metres (6 ft 7 in) and adding a new belltower and church porch on the west end of the newly enlarged nave. In 1862, the wall between the nave and chancel was removed and the ceiling was arched. The small 2nd floor seating gallery was also removed during this time. In 1913, there were plans to dismantle the church and move it to a museum in the village of Kaupanger (in Sogndal Municipality), but this never happened because money was never raised to replace the old church. Instead it was reconstructed in 1984 and underwent extensive maintenance work. Inside the church, the ceiling is decorated with biblical figures and angels.

== Media gallery ==
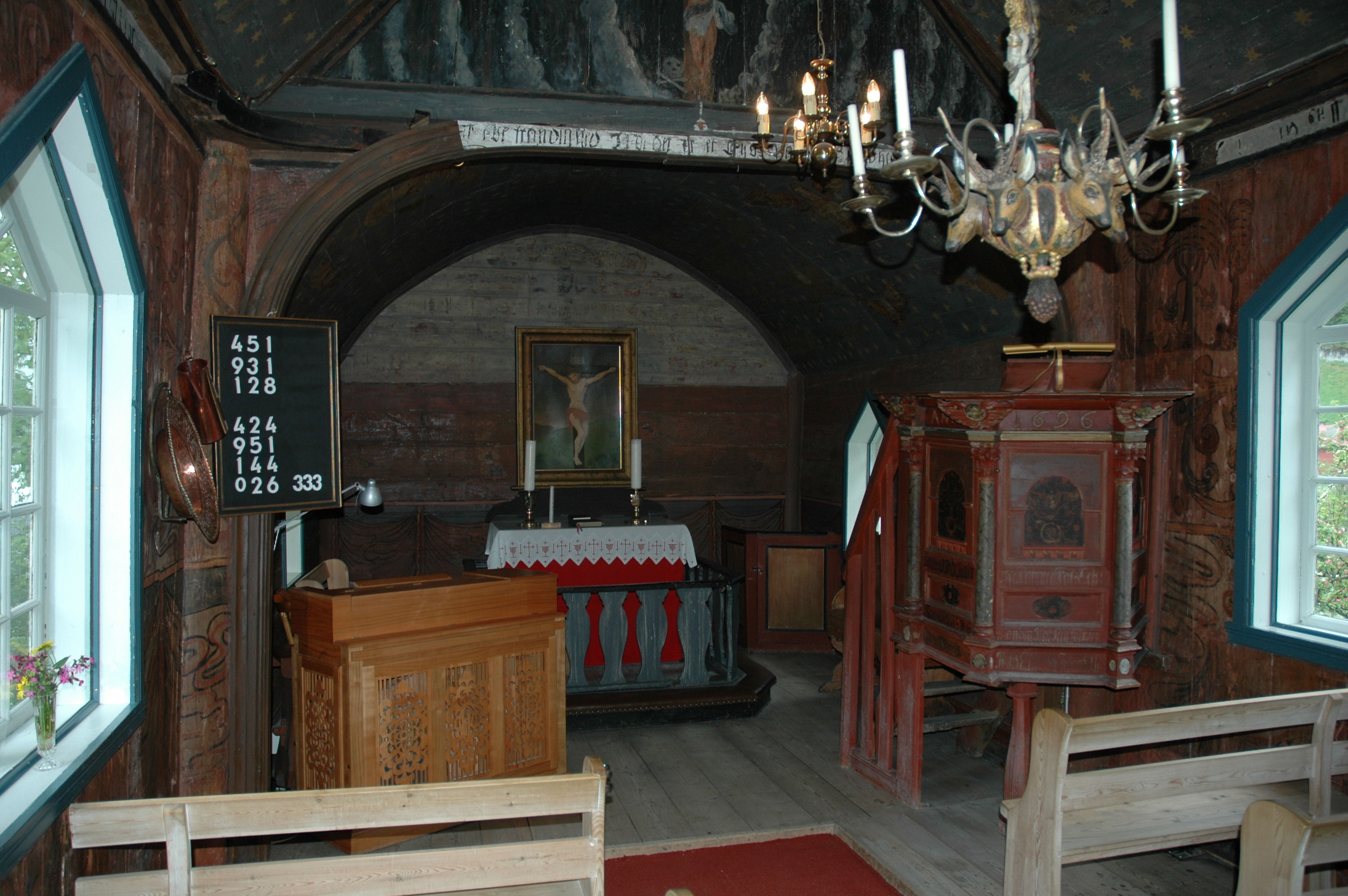
The altar

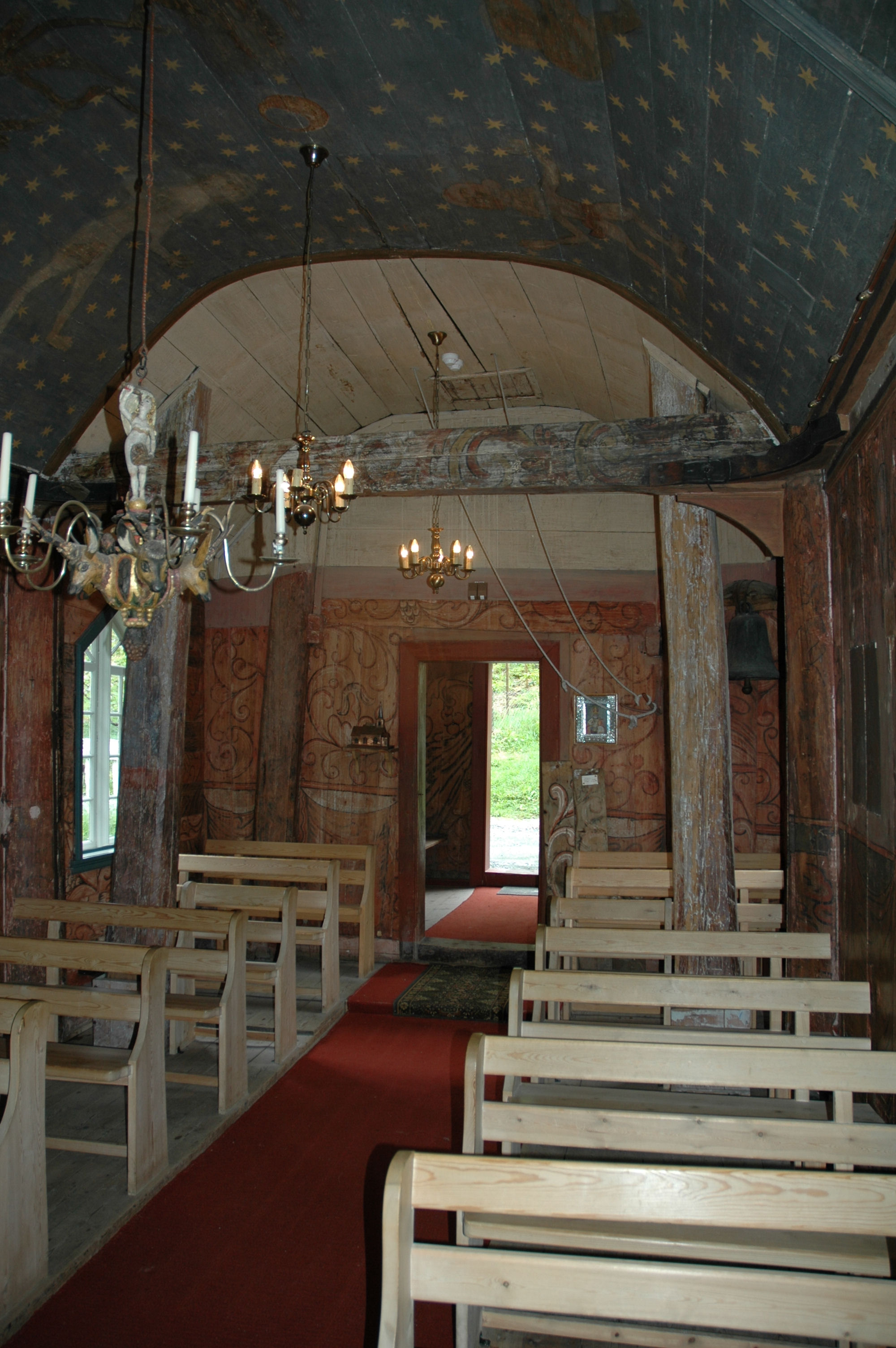
The nave

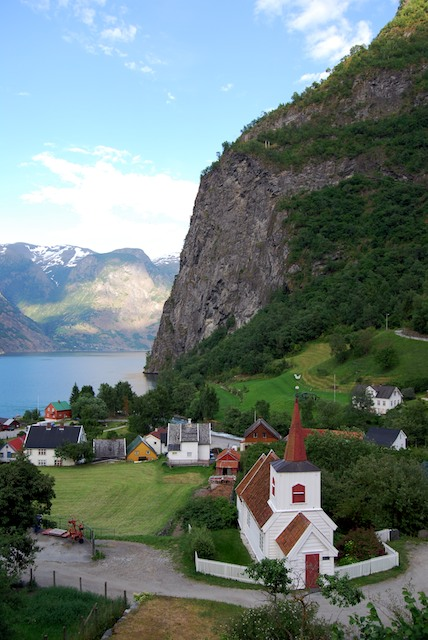
Front view

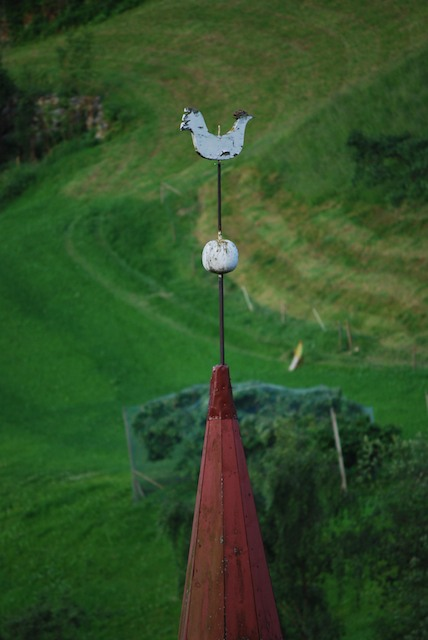
The spire

== See also ==
- List of churches in Bjørgvin

== Other sources ==
- Anker, Leif (2005). The Norwegian Stave Churches. Oslo: Arfo Forlag. ISBN 978-8291399294.
