= Urland (performance collective) =

URLAND, also styled as Urland, is a performance collective from Rotterdam, the Netherlands. Established in 2010 at the Theatre Academy of Maastricht, URLAND has made a significant impact in the realm of performance art. The collective was founded by Thomas Dudkiewicz, Marijn Alexander de Jong, Ludwig Bindervoet, and Jimi Zoet. These artists have diverse backgrounds in theater, dance, music, visual arts, and digital media, which they blend to create innovative and interdisciplinary performances.

The collective is known for its unique approach to art, combining various forms of expression to create visually captivating and intellectually stimulating performances. URLAND's work often explores modern social, political, and cultural themes, challenging traditional notions of performance and audience interaction. The collective has used Artificial intelligence to challenge what the meaning of an artist is, working with ChatGPT to create a script and clone various voices.

A notable aspect of URLAND's work is their use of technology, integrating digital media and interactive technology to enhance the sensory experience of their performances. Their productions often feature multimedia installations, projection mapping, and innovative sound design.

URLAND has gained international recognition for its avant-garde productions and has been invited to perform at prestigious art festivals and venues worldwide. Their work not only entertains but also provokes thought and discussion among audiences, contributing significantly to contemporary performance art.

Since 2024, URLAND has its own theater in Rotterdam Zuid and receives structural funding from both the Dutch government and the city of Rotterdam. Some of their notable productions include Formerly Known As, The Last Chapters, De Eindtijd Revue, Patroon, and Elckerlijc, among others.

The collective operates autonomously, without a hierarchy or a director, and is involved in every aspect of their productions, from set design to sound creation and performance. They see technology as a means rather than an end and believe in live art in digital times.

URLAND's commitment to pushing the boundaries of traditional performance, combined with their interdisciplinary approach and engagement with contemporary issues, positions them as a leading force in modern performance art.

== Productions ==
- 2024: Formerly Known As
- 2024: The Last Chapters
- 2023: De Eindtijd Revue
- 2022: Patroon
- 2021: Elckerlijc
- 2020: mu' mu' mu'
- 2020: Bobby Baxter
- 2019: De Internet Trilogie
- 2019: URLAUB
- 2018: de URtriennale 2018
- 2018: UR
- 2017: URLAND presents: Bedtime Stories
- 2016: INTERNET OF THINGS/Prometheus de vuurbrenger
- 2015: De Internet Trilogie Deel II: EXPLORER/ Prometheus ontketend, a collaboration with CREW Eric Joris
- 2015: URLAND PRESENTS 4 NOBLE TRUTHS IN 49 SLIDES
- 2014: De Internet Trilogie Deel I: MS DOS/ Prometheus geketend
- 2014: URLAND presenteert: 1 zoekresultaten
- 2013: Kwartet, een Powerballad (coproductie met Naomi Velissariou)
- 2012: House on Mars: PIXELRAVE (coproductie met Het Huis van Bourgondië)
- 2012: House on Mars
- 2011: De Oktobertragödie (een Komödie)
- 2010: De Gabber Opera
- 2024: Formerly Known As
