= Aurland Municipality =

Municipality in Vestland, Norway

Aurland Municipality Aurland kommune
- Municipality
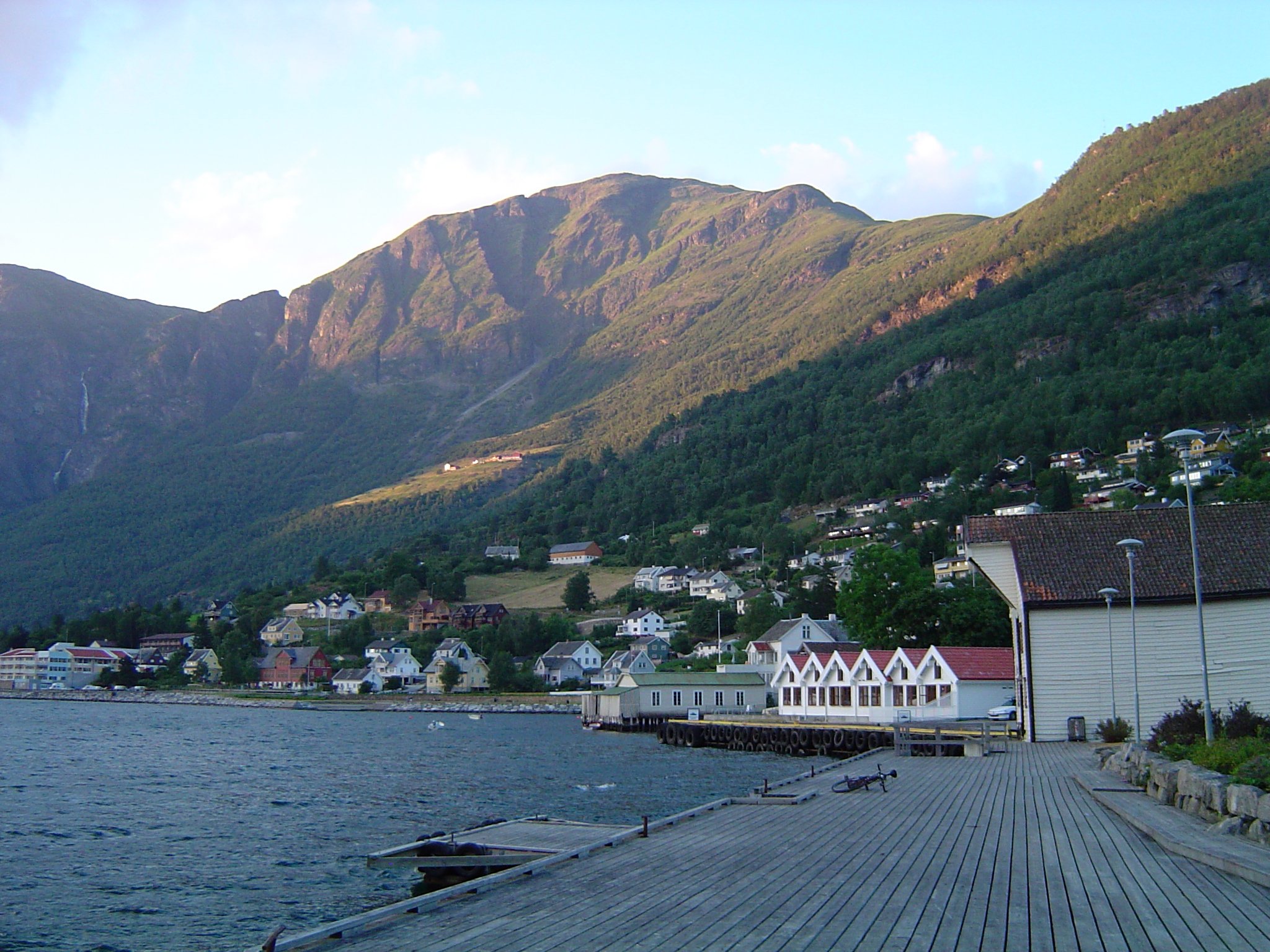
- View of Aurlandsvangen

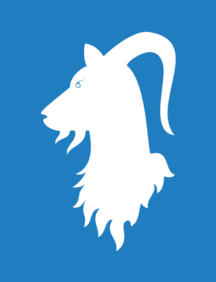
- Flag Coat of arms

- Vestland within Norway

- Aurland within Vestland
- Coordinates: 60°52′05″N 07°14′36″E
- Country: Norway
- County: Vestland
- District: Sogn
- Established: 1 January 1838
  - Created as: Formannskapsdistrikt
- Administrative centre: Aurlandsvangen

Government
  - Mayor (2023): Kjell Bøe Bjørgum (Ap)

Area
  - Total: 1,467.69 km^{2} (566.68 sq mi)
  - Land: 1,375.77 km^{2} (531.19 sq mi)
  - Water: 91.92 km^{2} (35.49 sq mi) 6.3%
  - Rank: #59 in Norway
- Highest elevation: 1,809.31 m (5,936.1 ft)

Population (2025)
  - Total: 1,836
  - Rank: #293 in Norway
  - Density: 1.3/km^{2} (3.4/sq mi)
  - Change (10 years): ▲ +5%
- Demonym: Aurlending

Official language
  - Norwegian form: Nynorsk
- Time zone: UTC+01:00 (CET)
  - Summer (DST): UTC+02:00 (CEST)
- ISO 3166 code: NO-4641
- Website: Official website

Aurland (Urban East Norwegian: [ˈæ̂ʉrlɑn]) is a municipality in the county of Vestland, Norway. It is located on the south side of the Sognefjorden in the traditional district of Sogn. The administrative center is the village of Aurlandsvangen. Other villages include Bakka, Flåm, Myrdal, Undredal, and Gudvangen.

The 1,467.69-square-kilometre (566.68 sq mi) municipality is the 59th largest by area out of the 357 municipalities in Norway. Aurland Municipality is the 293rd most populous municipality in Norway with a population of 1,836. The municipality's population density is 1.3 inhabitants per square kilometre (3.4/sq mi) and its population has increased by 5% over the previous 10-year period.

== General information ==
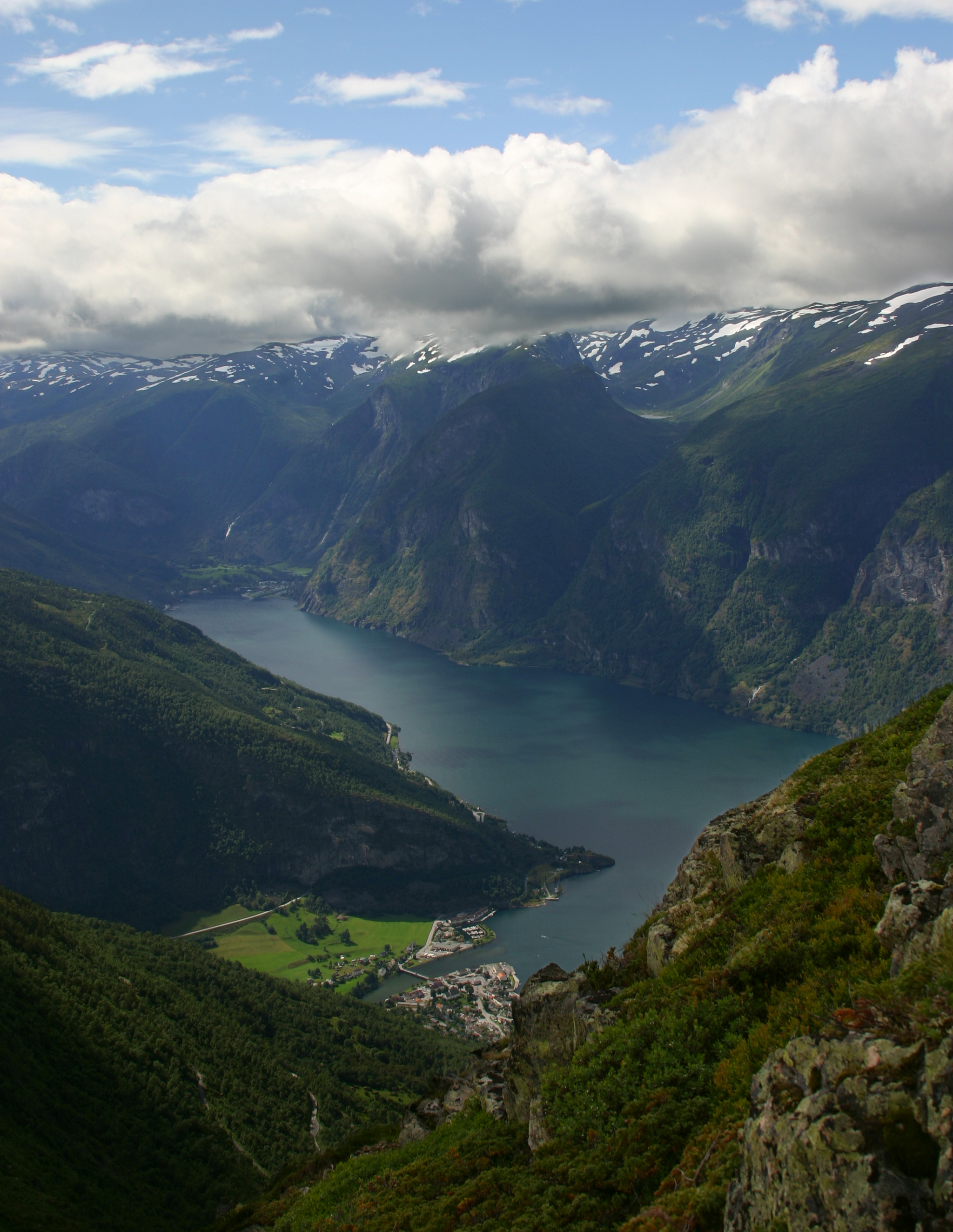
View of the Aurlandsfjorden, Aurlandsvangen, and Flåm

The parish of Aurland was established as a municipality on 1 January 1838 (see formannskapsdistrikt law). The original municipality was identical to the Church of Norway's Aurland prestegjeld with the parishes (sokn) of Aurlandsvangen, Flåm, and Undredal. In 1859, the new parish of Nærøy was created by separating it from the sub-parish of Undredal. The municipal borders have not changed since 1838.

Historically, this municipality was part of the old Sogn og Fjordane county. On 1 January 2020, the municipality became a part of the newly-formed Vestland county (after Hordaland and Sogn og Fjordane counties were merged).

=== Name ===
The municipality (originally the parish) is named after the old village of Aurland (Old Norse: Aurland) since the first Vangen Church was built there. The first element is aurr which means "gravel" or "moist earth". The last element is land which means "land" or "district".

=== Coat of arms ===
The coat of arms was granted on 22 May 1987. The official blazon is "Azure, a goat buck's head erased argent" (Norwegian: På blå grunn eit avrive sølv geitebukkhovud). This means the arms have a blue field (background) and the charge is the head of a male goat. The goat head has a tincture of argent which means it is commonly colored white, but if it is made out of metal, then silver is used. A goat was considered an appropriate symbol for the municipality since the area is famed for its goat farming and its production of goat cheese. The arms were designed by Inge Rotevatn. The municipal flag has the same design as the coat of arms.

=== Churches ===
The Church of Norway has four parishes (sokn) within Aurland Municipality. It is part of the Sogn prosti (deanery) in the Diocese of Bjørgvin.

Churches in Aurland Municipality
Parish (sokn)	Church name	Location of the church	Year built
Flåm	Flåm Church	Flåm	1667
Nærøy	Bakka Church	Bakka	1859
Undredal	Undredal Stave Church	Undredal	1147
Vangen	Vangen Church	Aurlandsvangen	1202

== History ==
The earliest inhabitants lived by hunting and fishing until they gradually started farming about 2,000 years ago. Agriculture is still important with the rich valley floors and abundant mountain pastures. As in all of western Norway, the area was overpopulated in the middle 19th century, and cotters were forced to clear land far up the mountainsides. This difficulty led to emigration and in the 20-year period after 1845, 1,050 people moved out of the community—most of them moving to America.

Tourism came to the community as early as the middle of the 19th century, in the form of sport fishing and hunting. Tourists from England were dominant during this time and one can still find English names for mountaintops, hunting cabins, and fishing holes.

Later, a different type of tourist came to the region. These tourists came to enjoy the natural beauty of the area. These tourists created a need for jobs in the form of transportation and lodging. Three or four ships would anchor in the Nærøyfjord at a time which created the need for scores of horse-drawn carriages to take the tourists up to Stalheim hotel, located just over the border in Voss Municipality to the southwest.

== Government ==
Aurland Municipality is responsible for primary education (through 10th grade), outpatient health services, senior citizen services, welfare and other social services, zoning, economic development, and municipal roads and utilities. The municipality is governed by a municipal council of directly elected representatives. The mayor is indirectly elected by a vote of the municipal council. The municipality is under the jurisdiction of the Sogn og Fjordane District Court and the Gulating Court of Appeal.

=== Municipal council ===
The municipal council (Kommunestyre) of Aurland Municipality is made up of 17 representatives that are elected to four-year terms. The tables below show the current and historical composition of the council by political party.

Aurland kommunestyre 2023–2027
Party name (in Nynorsk)	Number of representatives
Labour Party (Arbeidarpartiet)	7
Green Party (Miljøpartiet Dei Grøne)	1
Conservative Party (Høgre)	5
Centre Party (Senterpartiet)	3
Liberal Party (Venstre)	1
Total number of members:	17

Aurland kommunestyre 2019–2023
Party name (in Nynorsk)	Number of representatives
Labour Party (Arbeidarpartiet)	4
Green Party (Miljøpartiet Dei Grøne)	2
Conservative Party (Høgre)	3
Centre Party (Senterpartiet)	8
Total number of members:	17

Aurland kommunestyre 2015–2019
Party name (in Nynorsk)	Number of representatives
Labour Party (Arbeidarpartiet)	4
Green Party (Miljøpartiet Dei Grøne)	2
Conservative Party (Høgre)	6
Centre Party (Senterpartiet)	4
Liberal Party (Venstre)	1
Total number of members:	17

Aurland kommunestyre 2011–2015
Party name (in Nynorsk)	Number of representatives
Labour Party (Arbeidarpartiet)	4
Green Party (Miljøpartiet Dei Grøne)	1
Conservative Party (Høgre)	5
Centre Party (Senterpartiet)	5
Liberal Party (Venstre)	2
Total number of members:	17

Aurland kommunestyre 2007–2011
Party name (in Nynorsk)	Number of representatives
Labour Party (Arbeidarpartiet)	5
Conservative Party (Høgre)	4
Centre Party (Senterpartiet)	7
Liberal Party (Venstre)	1
Total number of members:	17

Aurland kommunestyre 2003–2007
Party name (in Nynorsk)	Number of representatives
Labour Party (Arbeidarpartiet)	5
Conservative Party (Høgre)	5
Centre Party (Senterpartiet)	7
Socialist Left Party (Sosialistisk Venstreparti)	2
Liberal Party (Venstre)	2
Total number of members:	21

Aurland kommunestyre 1999–2003
Party name (in Nynorsk)	Number of representatives
Labour Party (Arbeidarpartiet)	5
Conservative Party (Høgre)	4
Centre Party (Senterpartiet)	9
Socialist Left Party (Sosialistisk Venstreparti)	2
Liberal Party (Venstre)	1
Total number of members:	21

Aurland kommunestyre 1995–1999
Party name (in Nynorsk)	Number of representatives
Labour Party (Arbeidarpartiet)	8
Conservative Party (Høgre)	3
Centre Party (Senterpartiet)	8
Socialist Left Party (Sosialistisk Venstreparti)	1
Liberal Party (Venstre)	1
Total number of members:	21

Aurland kommunestyre 1991–1995
Party name (in Nynorsk)	Number of representatives
Labour Party (Arbeidarpartiet)	7
Conservative Party (Høgre)	6
Centre Party (Senterpartiet)	5
Socialist Left Party (Sosialistisk Venstreparti)	2
Liberal Party (Venstre)	1
Total number of members:	21

Aurland kommunestyre 1987–1991
Party name (in Nynorsk)	Number of representatives
Labour Party (Arbeidarpartiet)	9
Conservative Party (Høgre)	3
Centre Party (Senterpartiet)	4
Socialist Left Party (Sosialistisk Venstreparti)	2
Joint list of the Liberal Party (Venstre) and Christian Democratic Party (Kristelig Folkeparti)	2
Common list in Aurland (Samlingslista i Aurland)	1
Total number of members:	21

Aurland kommunestyre 1983–1987
Party name (in Nynorsk)	Number of representatives
Labour Party (Arbeidarpartiet)	8
Conservative Party (Høgre)	4
Centre Party (Senterpartiet)	4
Joint list of the Liberal Party (Venstre) and Christian Democratic Party (Kristelig Folkeparti)	3
Common list in Aurland (Samlingslista i Aurland)	2
Total number of members:	21

Aurland kommunestyre 1979–1983
Party name (in Nynorsk)	Number of representatives
Labour Party (Arbeidarpartiet)	8
Conservative Party (Høgre)	5
Centre Party (Senterpartiet)	4
Joint list of the Christian Democratic Party (Kristeleg Folkeparti), New People's Party (Nye Folkepartiet), and Liberal Party (Venstre)	4
Total number of members:	21

Aurland kommunestyre 1975–1979
Party name (in Nynorsk)	Number of representatives
Labour Party (Arbeidarpartiet)	9
Conservative Party (Høgre)	2
Joint list of the Centre Party (Senterpartiet), Christian Democratic Party (Kristeleg Folkeparti), New People's Party (Nye Folkepartiet), and Liberal Party (Venstre)	10
Total number of members:	21

Aurland kommunestyre 1971–1975
Party name (in Nynorsk)	Number of representatives
Labour Party (Arbeidarpartiet)	10
Conservative Party (Høgre)	2
Centre Party (Senterpartiet)	5
Liberal Party (Venstre)	4
Total number of members:	21

Aurland kommunestyre 1967–1971
Party name (in Nynorsk)	Number of representatives
Labour Party (Arbeidarpartiet)	9
Conservative Party (Høgre)	3
Centre Party (Senterpartiet)	5
Liberal Party (Venstre)	4
Total number of members:	21

Aurland kommunestyre 1963–1967
Party name (in Nynorsk)	Number of representatives
Labour Party (Arbeidarpartiet)	9
Liberal Party (Venstre)	6
Joint List(s) of Non-Socialist Parties (Borgarlege Felleslister)	6
Total number of members:	21

Aurland heradsstyre 1959–1963
Party name (in Nynorsk)	Number of representatives
Labour Party (Arbeidarpartiet)	9
Conservative Party (Høgre)	2
Centre Party (Senterpartiet)	4
Joint List(s) of Non-Socialist Parties (Borgarlege Felleslister)	6
Total number of members:	21

Aurland heradsstyre 1955–1959
Party name (in Nynorsk)	Number of representatives
Labour Party (Arbeidarpartiet)	7
Conservative Party (Høgre)	1
Joint List(s) of Non-Socialist Parties (Borgarlege Felleslister)	10
Local List(s) (Lokale lister)	3
Total number of members:	21

Aurland heradsstyre 1951–1955
Party name (in Nynorsk)	Number of representatives
Labour Party (Arbeidarpartiet)	10
Joint List(s) of Non-Socialist Parties (Borgarlege Felleslister)	8
Local List(s) (Lokale lister)	10
Total number of members:	28

Aurland heradsstyre 1947–1951
Party name (in Nynorsk)	Number of representatives
Labour Party (Arbeidarpartiet)	11
Joint List(s) of Non-Socialist Parties (Borgarlege Felleslister)	13
Local List(s) (Lokale lister)	4
Total number of members:	28

Aurland heradsstyre 1945–1947
Party name (in Nynorsk)	Number of representatives
Labour Party (Arbeidarpartiet)	9
Farmers' Party (Bondepartiet)	2
Liberal Party (Venstre)	4
Joint List(s) of Non-Socialist Parties (Borgarlege Felleslister)	4
Local List(s) (Lokale lister)	5
Total number of members:	24

Aurland heradsstyre 1937–1941*
Party name (in Nynorsk)	Number of representatives
Labour Party (Arbeidarpartiet)	7
Farmers' Party (Bondepartiet)	4
Liberal Party (Venstre)	5
Joint List(s) of Non-Socialist Parties (Borgarlege Felleslister)	4
Local List(s) (Lokale lister)	4
Total number of members:	24
Note: Due to the German occupation of Norway during World War II, no elections were held for new municipal councils until after the war ended in 1945.

=== Mayors ===
The mayor (Nynorsk: ordførar) of Aurland Municipality is the political leader of the municipality and the chairperson of the municipal council. Here is a list of people who have held this position:

- 1838–1839: Rev. Jonas Wessel Crøger
- 1840–1841: Torstein G. Fretheim
- 1842–1843: Rev. Kjeld Andreas Bugge
- 1844–1859: Torstein G. Fretheim
- 1860–1861: Rev. Johan Henrik Allum
- 1862–1867: Sjur J. Loven
- 1868–1871: Torstein G. Fretheim
- 1872–1881: Lars O. Ohnstad
- 1882–1885: Eirik P. Otternæs
- 1886–1897: Anders Brekke
- 1899–1907: Peder Skjerdal
- 1909–1925: Olav Sævartveit
- 1926–1928: Jens Lunde
- 1928–1929: Per Wangen
- 1939–1941: Jens Lunde
- 1942–1945: Torstein Skahjem
- 1945–1945: Jens Lunde
- 1946–1959: Jon Ø. Underdahl
- 1960–1963: Ragnvald Winjum (V)
- 1965–1971: Svein Fossheim (Sp)
- 1971–1979: Martin Widme (Ap)
- 1980–1985: Torleiv Gjerløw (Sp)
- 1986–1991: Osvald Turlid (Ap)
- 1992–2003: Ivar Bjarne Underdal (Sp)
- 2003–2011: Olav J. Ellingsen (Sp)
- 2011–2019: Noralv Distad (H)
- 2019–2023: Trygve Skjerdal (Sp)
- 2023–present: Kjell Bøe Bjørgum (Ap)

=== Police ===
In 2016, the chief of police for Vestlandet formally suggested a reconfiguration of police districts and stations. He proposed that the police station in Aurland be closed.

== Geography ==
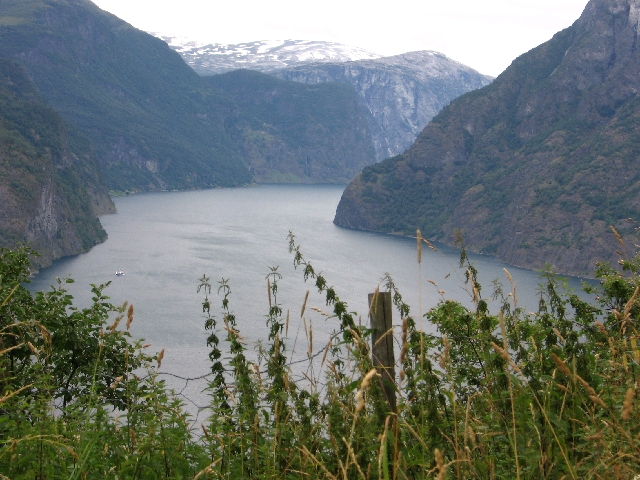
View on the Aurlandsfjord (northwest direction)

Aurland Municipality lies 200 kilometres (120 mi) from the west coast of Norway in the eastern part of Vestland county, along the Aurlandsfjorden and the Nærøyfjorden. These are branches that flow off of the world's longest and deepest fjord, the Sognefjorden.

Aurland Municipality is bordered by four municipalities in Vestland county: Lærdal Municipality to the northeast and Vik Municipality to the west, Voss Municipality to the southwest, and Ulvik Municipality to the south. It is also bordered by Hol Municipality in Buskerud county to the southeast.

Most of the area is composed of fjords and mountains with small populated areas concentrated in the lower river valleys, the largest of which is the Aurlandsdalen. The main village areas include Aurlandsvangen, Gudvangen, Undredal, Flåm, and Vassbygdi.

Wild and beautiful nature dominate the community from the fjords to mountaintops that are 1,200 to 1,800 metres (3,900 to 5,900 ft) above sea level. The highest point in the municipality is the 1,809.31-metre (5,936.1 ft) tall mountain Blåskavlen. There are two permanent glaciers in Aurland: Storskavlen and Blåskavlen.

The Aurlandsfjellet mountains separate Aurland from the neighboring Lærdal Municipality to the east. The Lærdal Tunnel, the longest in the world as of 2014, cuts through the mountains connecting the two municipalities. The Gudvanga Tunnel connects the villages of Gudvangen and Undredal in southwestern Aurland.

== Nature ==
=== Climate ===
Aurland has a typical inland climate with mild winters at the lower levels, early springs, and warm summers. A yearly average of 470 millimetres (19 in) of precipitation make Aurland one of the driest areas in Norway. In comparison, Bergen has 2,250 millimetres (89 in) of precipitation per year.

=== Vegetation ===
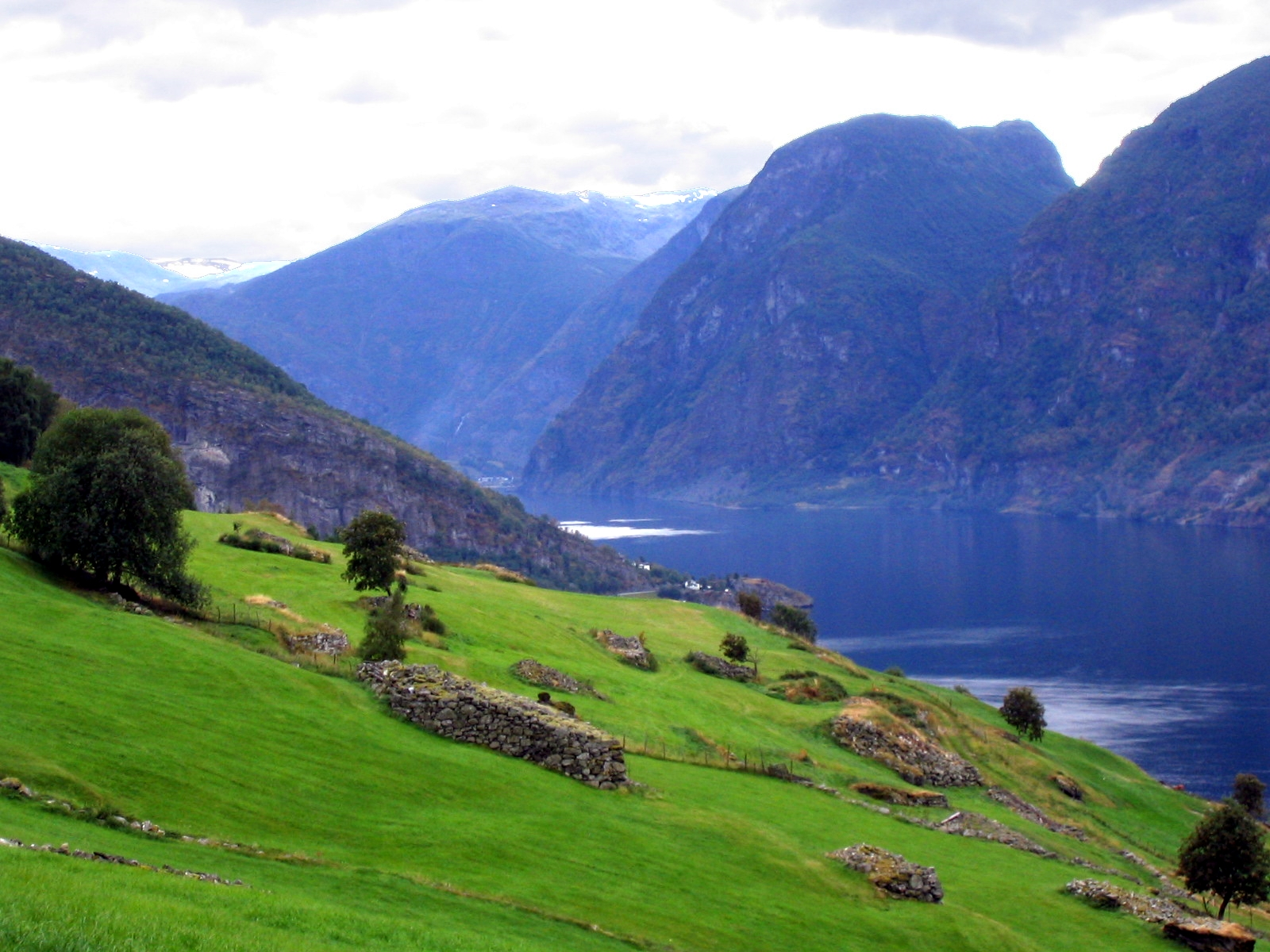
View of mountains and fjords in Aurland

Aurland has rich and varied flora, which is more typical of eastern rather than western Norway. The mountain plant life is especially rich since the bedrock contains calcium rich deposits of phyllite.

=== Geology ===
The oldest bedrock in Aurland are Precambrian basement rocks which crop out in tectonic windows in the north-eastern part of the municipality. This basement unit is mainly composed of granites, granodiorites and gneisses and is overlain by a nappe unit of cambro-silurian phyllite and mica schist of varying thickness. This is in turn overlain by a second nappe unit, called the Jotundekket (“Jokun Nappe”), which consists of Precambrian, mainly magmatic rocks which are more or less metamorphosed into gneisses and amphibolite.

Part of the scenery took its shape 9,000 years ago, at the end of the ice age. The ice's advance was either halted or continued, according to the climatic conditions, and moraine ridges and gravel terraces were deposited along the glacier front. They are still visible today south of the Flåm church.

On the western side of the Aurlandsfjord, there is rock that was pushed up into mountain ranges several million years ago. The fjord itself was gouged out of an earlier valley. Aurlandsvangen is typical of the lower areas, lying on an old river delta—the land is very flat and fertile. The mountainsides are steep causing frequent rock slides and avalanches.

The lakes Nyhellervatnet and Fretheimsdalsvatnet are located in Aurland.

== Attractions ==
=== UNESCO World Heritage Site ===
The West Norwegian Fjords of Geirangefjord and Nærøyfjord were added to UNESCO's World Heritage Site list in 2005. The two fjords are situated 120 kilometres (75 mi) from each other and they are separated by the Jostedalsbreen glacier. The World Heritage Site possesses a unique combination of glacial landforms at the same time as each area is characterised by its own outstanding beauty. The Nærøyfjord areas in this site stretch through the neighboring municipalities of Aurland, Lærdal, Vik, and Voss.

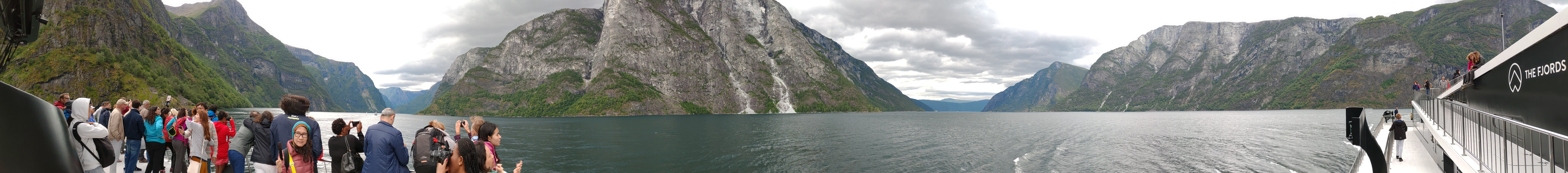
View of Naeroyfjord from a tourist ferry

=== Aurlandsdalen Valley ===
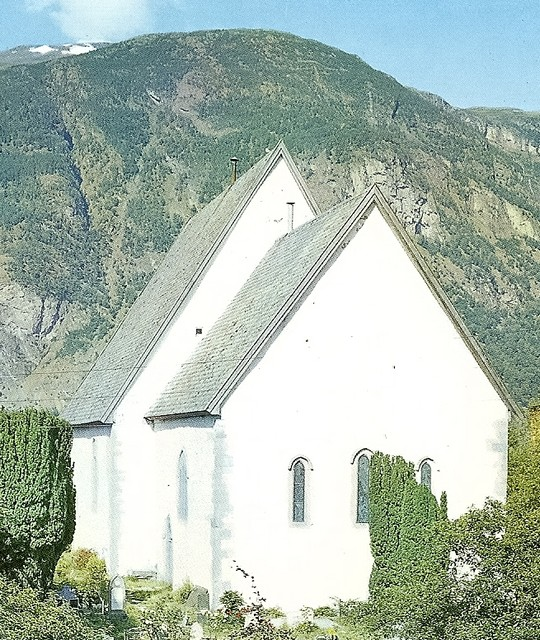
Vangen Church in Aurlandsvangen

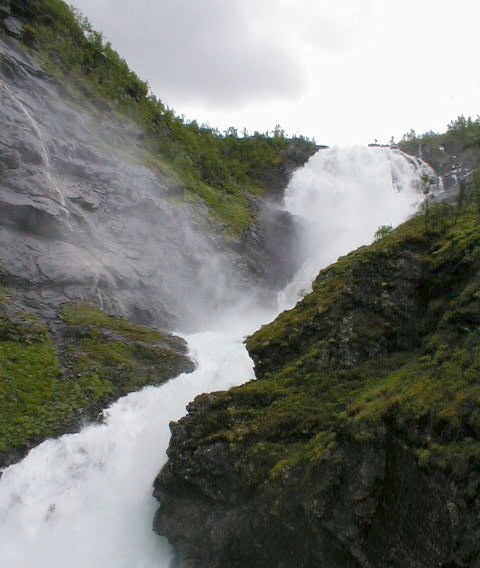
Kjosfossen waterfall

The Aurlandsdalen valley is a known hiking trail in Norway with its nature and countryside. The valley is rich in history and culture. One can take the hike in several stages: From Geiteryggen where the path starts, it is a four-hour hike to Steinbergdalen. There are views of mountain peaks, snow glaciers, and lakes. In Steinbergdalen you will find Steinbergdalen mountain lodge which opened in 1895.

=== Flåmsbana Railway ===
The Flåm Railway is regarded by many as one of the most beautiful railway journeys in the world. This journey from Myrdal to Flåm is twelve miles long (19 km), a descent of 866 metres (2,841 ft). It has 20 tunnels with a total length of almost 6 kilometres (3.7 mi). About 80% of the Flåm railway has a maximum gradient of 5.5%. To cope with the enormous change in height over such a short stretch, the track runs partly through tunnels which spiral in and out of the mountainside. The gradient is quite exceptional for a normal railway and the carriages are fitted with five different brake systems, any one of which is sufficient to stop the train.

=== Undredal Stavkyrkje ===
The Undredal Stave Church is a simple, small one-nave church that was built around 1150. It is located in the village of Undredal. It is one of the oldest preserved stave churches in Norway.

=== Vangen Kyrkje ===
The Vangen Church was built in 1202. The church is built in the early Gothic style influenced by English architecture. A document written in 1714 tells us that English merchants used to stay in Aurland during long periods to buy different articles and they are supposed to have taken part in the building of the church. Most likely they would have been the master builders.

In 1725, the Danish-Norwegian government was experiencing financial problems and King Frederick IV sold the church. The church remained as private property until the late 19th century. Then the municipality bought Vangen church back for 500 kroner.

At the last restoration in 1926, the original colors and designs were uncovered. Then the ceiling was taken away and the baldachin over the pulpit was brought back again. A new altarpiece was made. The Norwegian artist Emanuel Vigeland made the stained glass windows (two of the windows in the chancel illustrate the Parable of the Prodigal Son, and the one in the middle is Jesus Christ, the Savior).

=== Sightseeing ===
- Kjelfossen is a waterfall located near the village of Gudvangen
- Kjosfossen and Rjoandefossen are waterfalls that can be seen from the Flåmsbana railway
- The Stegastein viewpoint was constructed in 2006 with views of the surrounding fjords and valleys.

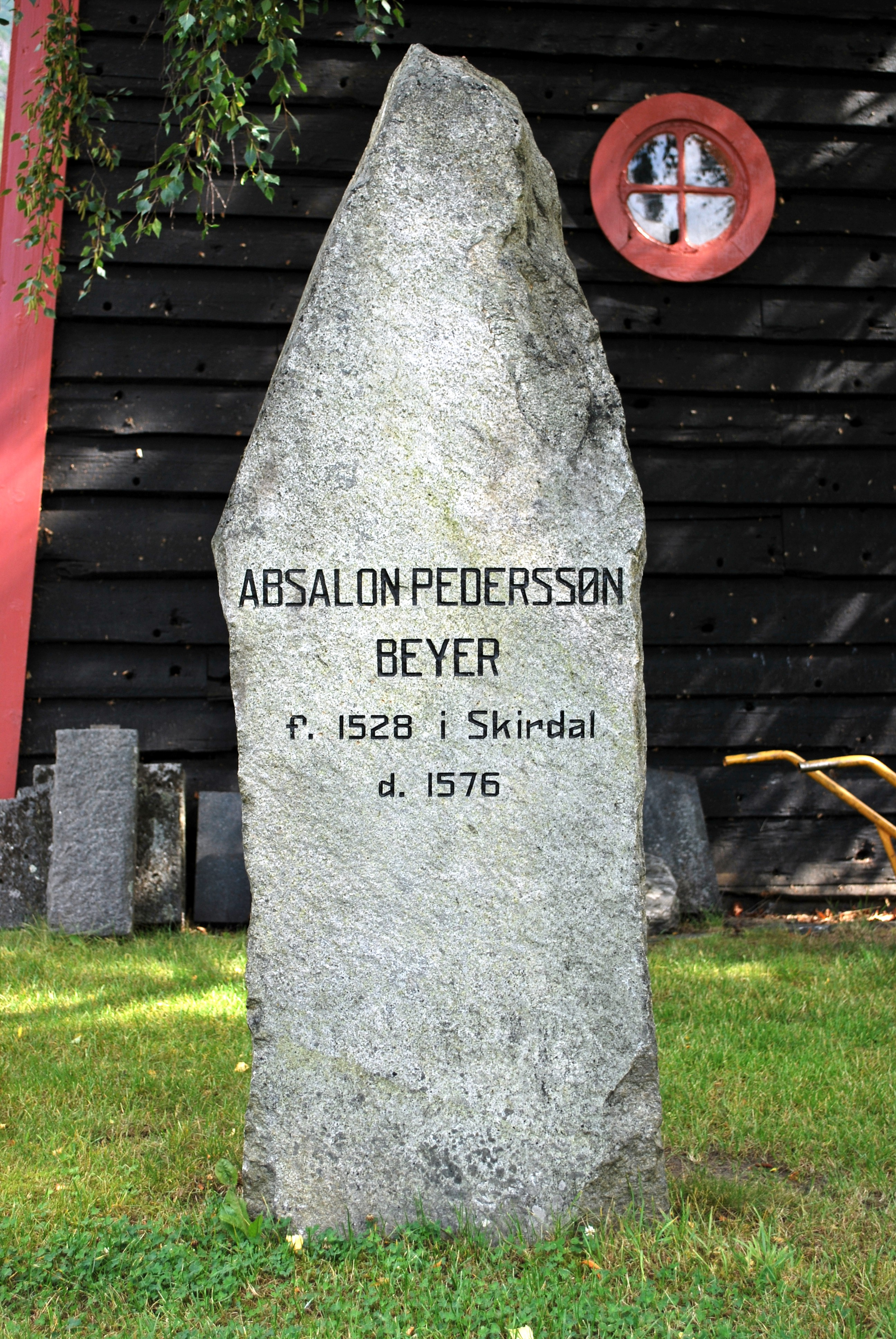
A P Beyer, memorial stone, Vangen kirke, Aurland

== Notable people ==
- Absalon Pederssøn Beyer (ca. 1528 in Aurland – 1575), an author, lecturer, and Lutheran clergyman
- Ragnvald Gjerløw (1853 in Aurland – 1936), a priest and writer
- Per Sivle (1857 in Flåm – 1904), a poet, novelist, and newspaper editor
- Ragnvald Winjum (1917–1965), a Norwegian jurist, politician, farmer, and attorney who lived in Aurland from 1953 and became the Mayor of Aurland municipality
- Keldian (formed 2005 in Aurland), a power metal band
