= National Tourist Routes in Norway =

Highways in Norway designated for their picturesque scenery

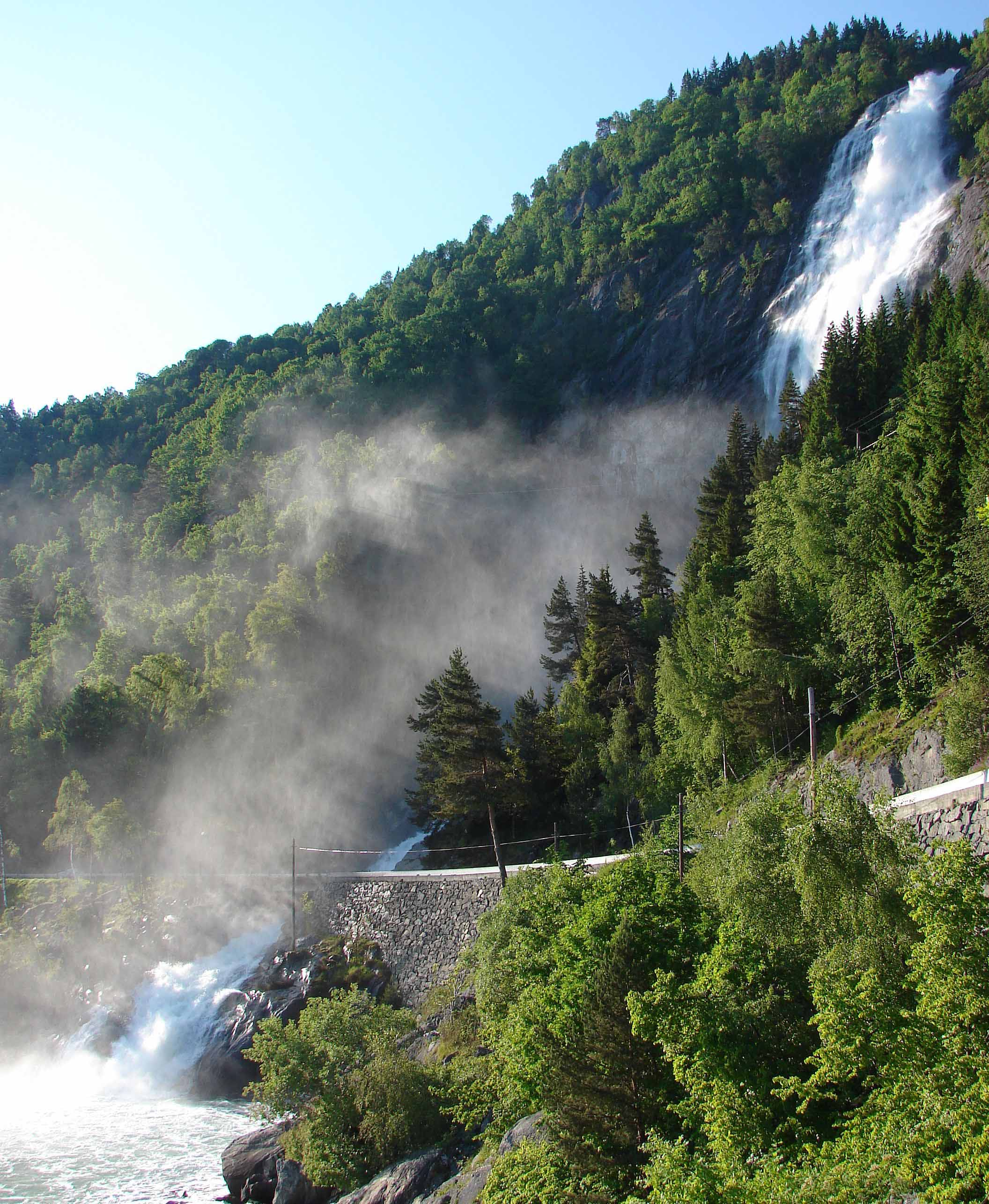
County Road 55 passes by Kvinnafossen.

Norwegian Scenic Routes (Norwegian: Nasjonale turistveger) are eighteen highways in Norway designated by the Norwegian Public Roads Administration for their picturesque scenery and tourist-friendly infrastructure, such as rest stops and viewpoints. The routes cover 1,850 kilometres (1,150 mi) and are located along the West Coast, in Northern Norway and in the mountains of Southern Norway. The authorities have coordinated the establishment of accommodation, cultural activities, dining, sale of local arts and crafts, and natural experiences along the tourist roads. The overall goal of the project is to increase tourism in the rural areas through which the roads run.

The project started in 1994 and was initially limited to Sognefjellsvegen, Gamle Strynefjellsveg, Hardanger and the Helgeland Coast Route. These were officially designated National Tourist Routes in 1997, and, the following year, the Storting decided to expand the project. Municipalities were asked to nominate roads, resulting in 52 nominees covering 8,000 kilometres (5,000 mi). Eighteen routes were selected in 2004, with the goal of completing the necessary upgrades and officially opening them as National Tourist Routes by 2015. The upgrades are estimated to cost 800 million Norwegian kroner (ca. €100 million). This includes building resting places, parking lots, viewpoints, and clearing vegetation. The Public Roads Administration's aim is that use of design will enhance the visitors' experience. While most of the architecture has been designed by young Norwegians, French-American Louise Bourgeois and Swiss Peter Zumthor have designed stops in Varanger and Ryfylke. Artworks have been installed at selected viewpoints, including one by American fine artist Mark Dion. All routes were signposted and officially designated by 2012. That year, the architecture magazine Topos awarded the project a special prize for its use of architecture, and particularly noted that it was a public-sector focus on aesthetic design.

Two routes constitute part of the International E-road network: E10 through Lofoten and E75 through Varanger. Mountain pass roads, such as Sognefjellsvegen, Valdresflye and Trollstigen, are closed during winter. Both sections of the Helgeland Coast Route have two ferries in them, while there is one ferry on Geiranger–Trollstigen and three each on the routes through Ryfylke and Hardanger. The Andøya and Senja routes are connected via the Andenes–Gryllefjord Ferry.

== List of routes ==
The following is a list of National Tourist Routes in Norway that have officially opened or have been approved and are under upgrade. It contains the name of the road, the start and finish locations of the route, the county or counties the route runs through, the road numbers the route follows, the length of the road and a description.

National Tourist Routes in Norway
Name	Image	Route	County(s)	Road(s)	Length		Description	Refs
Name	Image	Route	County(s)	Road(s)	km	mi	Description	Refs
Andøya	A flat, green landscape surrounded by peaks and the sea	Åkneskrysset–Andenes	Nordland	974, 976, 82	51	32	The road runs along the west coast of Andøya, the northernmost island of the Vesterålen archipelago, with fishing hamles located between unsheltered white beaches. The island features Norway's largest marshes; whales, seals and bird rocks can be spotted in the Norwegian Sea. The route connects to National Tourist Route Senja by ferry.	
Atlantic Ocean Road	A flat and an arch bridge	Kårvåg–Bud	Møre og Romsdal	64, 242, 663, 235, 238	36	22	From Kårvåg to Vevang the Atlantic Ocean Road is built across small unsheltered islands and skerries spanned by eight bridges, several causeways and viaducts. The National Tourist Route continues along the coast of Hustadvika—noted as a ship graveyard.	
Aurlandsfjellet	Bare road snow on both sides across a plateau	Aurlandsvangen–Lærdalsøyri	Vestland	5627	47	29	The crossing of Aurlandsfjellet bypasses the Lærdal Tunnel—the world's longest road tunnel. The barren mountain plateau offers views of the Aurlandsfjord 600 m (2,000 ft) below.	
Gamle Strynefjellsvegen	Barren valley with patches of green and tiny lakes	Grotli–Ospeli	Innlandet and Vestland	258	27	17	Opened in 1894, the road connects the mountain village of Skjåk with the fjord village of Stryn. The route passes round, glaciated forms in the east and steep, rugged topography in the west. Skiing is possible far into the summer and the road is not opened until June.	
Gaularfjellet	A small road climbs a mountainside in S-bends surrounded by green mountainsides and barren peaks.	Balestrand–Moskog	Vestland	55, 613	92	57	The route over Gaularfjellet offers an alternative between Sogn and Sunnfjord. Starting at Sognefjord, it passes lakes, rapids and waterfalls, varying between steep mountain climbs and sheltered valleys, at times clinging to the fjords.	
Geiranger–Trollstigen	An S-bend road climbing a valley with jagged peaks	Langevatn–Sogge Bridge	Møre og Romsdal	63	104	65	First climbing Trollstigen along its hairpin bends, the route then drops down to Geirangerfjord, a World Heritage Site, where the road follows the fjordside until reaching Geiranger.	
Hardanger	A road bridge across a waterfall	Halne–Steinsdalsfossen, Jondal–Utne, Kinsarvik–Tyssedal	Vestland	7, 550, 13	195	121	The route consists of three sections in Hardanger, which varies between fjordlandscape, moorlands, mountainsides and glaciers. The area is scattered with waterfalls, including Vøringfossen and Steinsdalsfossen. The region is the hallmark of Norwegian romantic nationalism and features roadside sale of traditional handicrafts and fruit.	
Havøysund	A road runs through a grassland tundra with the ocean in the background	Kokelv–Havøysund	Finnmark	889	66	41	Running through a deserted Arctic wilderness, the route has the sea on the one side and barren mountains on the other. The area is unpopulated except for the fishing village of Havøysund, and the small villages of Kokelv, Lillefjord, Slåtten and Snefjord.	
Helgeland Coast North	A cantilever bridge crosses a sound surrounded by green forests and jagged mountains in the backdrop	Stokkvågen–Storvika	Nordland	17	129	80	A coastal alternative to E6, the route runs north–south through Helgeland. The sea-side is paraded by 14,000 islands, while the land-side presents the glacier Svartisen and its branch, Engabreen, which falls 1,200 m (3,900 ft) from the mountains to the coast. To the north lies Saltstraumen, one of the world's most powerful tidal currents.	
Helgeland Coast South	A cross-cable bridge	Holm–Sandnessjøen	Nordland	17	97	60	A coastal alternative to E6, the route runs through a vast archipelago, with many islands accessible by ferry. The most popular is Vega, a World Heritage Site. Unique mountains include Torghatten with a natural hole through it and the Seven Sisters of Alstahaug Municipality.	
Jæren		Ogna–Bore	Rogaland	44, 507	41	25	Running along the uninterrupted ocean of the Jæren coastline, the route offers views of sandy beaches and sand dunes. Norway's largest lowland region is dominated by agriculture and a well-kept cultural landscape. The coastline features several lighthouse.	
Lofoten	White beach with forest-clad rolling hills in the background	Fiskebøl–Å	Nordland	E10, 82	164	102	The Lofoten archipelago combines the open sea, current sounds, white beaches and steep, pointed mountains. The fishing hamlets not only retain an active industry, but also preserve an active cultural heritage, such as with rorbu cabins.	
Rondane	A village on several small islands connected with bridges with staggering mountains close by	Enden–Folldal	Innlandet	27	48	30	The route has Rondane National Park and the Rondane massif to its east and a cultural landscape to its west. The mountains are dry and well-suited for hiking and summit tours, and include many marked paths and cabins. Along the route are the mines in Folldal Municipality.	
Ryfylke	A lake surrounded by forest and hills	Oanes–Sauda–Horda	Rogaland	13, 46, 520	183	114	The southern part of Ryfylke has fertile landscape and calm skerries, which contrast the rockslides, cliffs, fjords and mountains in the north. The nature is supplemented with smelting plants in Sauda Municipality and the zinc mines in Allmannajuvet. Preikestolen and the view of Lysefjord is a short side-trip away.	
Senja	A small fishing boat docked in a small fishing village	Gryllefjord–Botnhamn	Troms	86, 862	84	52	The route follows the west coast of the island of Senja, passing through several fishing villages. It connects to National Tourist Route Andøy via a ferry, which combined offer an alternative to the E6.	
Sognefjellsvegen	A road through a barren landscape with a lake to the right and mountains in the background	Lom–Gaupne	Innlandet and Vestland	55	108	67	The mountain pass over Sognefjellet reaches 1,434 m (4,705 ft) above mean sea level, making it the highest mountain pass in northern Europe. It is only open in the summer, as in May the snow banks on the side of the road can be 10 m (30 ft) tall. The route has views of meltwater green mountain lakes, glaciers and peaks. It provides access to Jotunheimen National Park and Jostedalsbreen National Park.	
Valdresflye	A mountain plateau	Garli–Besstrond	Innlandet	51	37	23	Valdresflye is a mountain plateau where the road reaches 1,389 m (4,557 ft) above mean sea level. On the plateau the route has views towards Jotunheimen National Park, while further down the road passes through cultivated landscape with mountain pastures.	
Varanger	A road running next to the sea	Varangerbotn–Hamningberg	Finnmark	E75, 341	160	99	The route follows the east coast of Varanger, bordering the Barents Sea. To the south the road runs through sheltered birtch forests and bogs, but by the time it reaches Vadsø, the landscape has become lunar and jagged. During winter, the coastline is rampaged with storms, freezing sea fog and the Arctic night. In summer, the short Siberian heat blends with the never-ending day. The area has rich traditions within trade and is a melting pot of Russian, Finnish, Norwegian and Sami culture.	
