= Aurland =

Aurland may refer to:

== Places ==
- Aurland Municipality, a municipality in Vestland county, Norway
- Aurland, or Aurlandsvangen, a village within Aurland Municipality in Vestland county, Norway
- Aurland Valley, or Aurlandsdalen, a valley within Aurland Municipality in Vestland county, Norway

== Other ==
- Aurland Hydroelectric Power Station (sometimes known as Aurland I, Aurland II, and Aurland III), hydroelectric power plants in Aurland Municipality in Vestland county, Norway
- Aurland United Norwegian Lutheran Church, a church in Frederick, South Dakota, USA
- Aurland Stadion, a stadium in Aurland Municipality in Vestland county, Norway
