= Stegastein =

Scenic viewpoint in Norway

Coordinates: 60°54′31″N 7°12′43″E

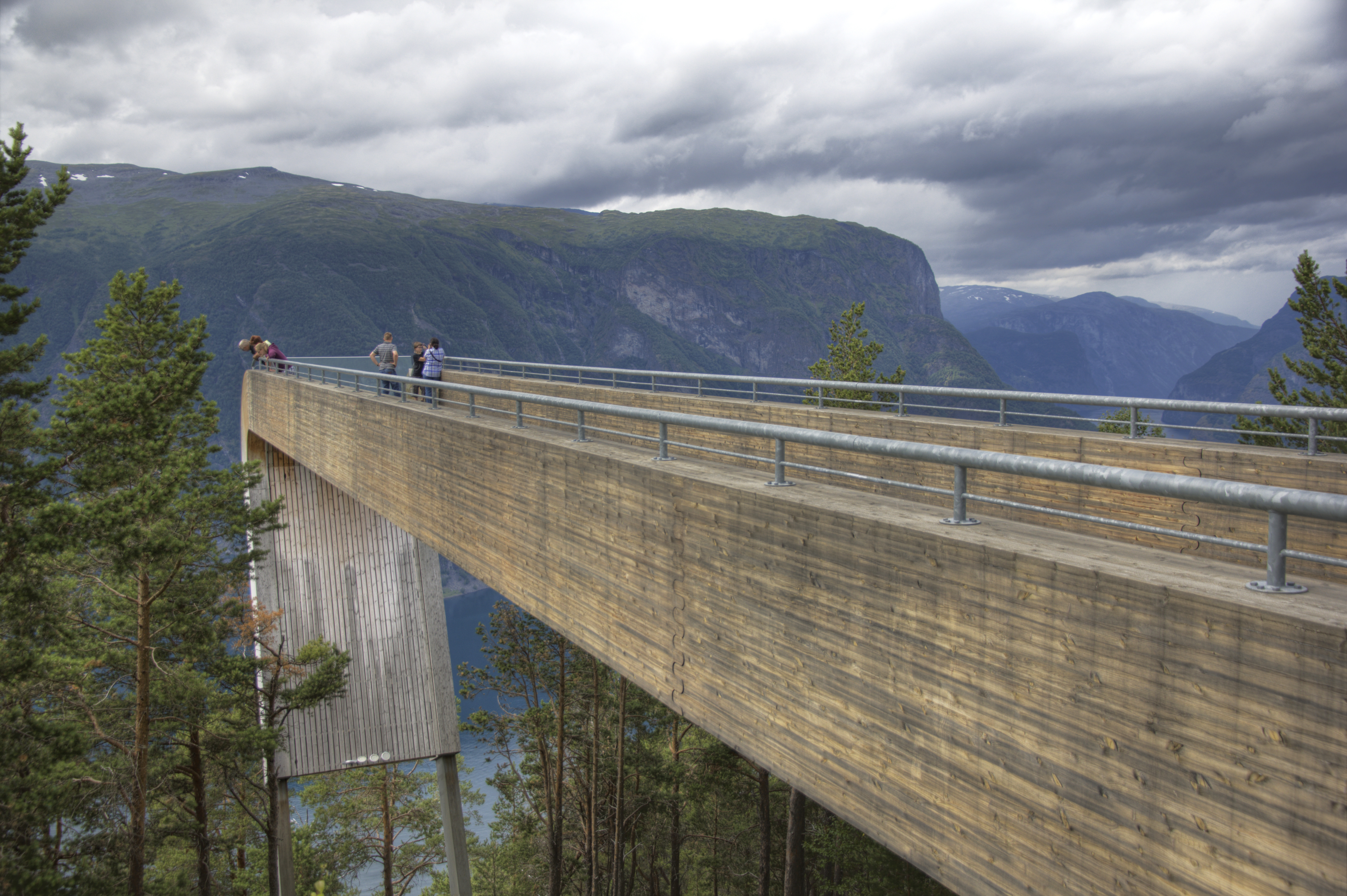
Stegastein overlook with Aurlandsfjord in the background

Stegastein is a scenic overlook on Sogn og Fjordane County Road 243 in Norway. The 30-metre (98 ft) long and 4-metre (13 ft) wide platform of steel and laminated pine overlooks Aurlandsvangen and the Aurlandsfjord. This project is part of a national program of tourist routes commissioned by the Norwegian Highway Department.

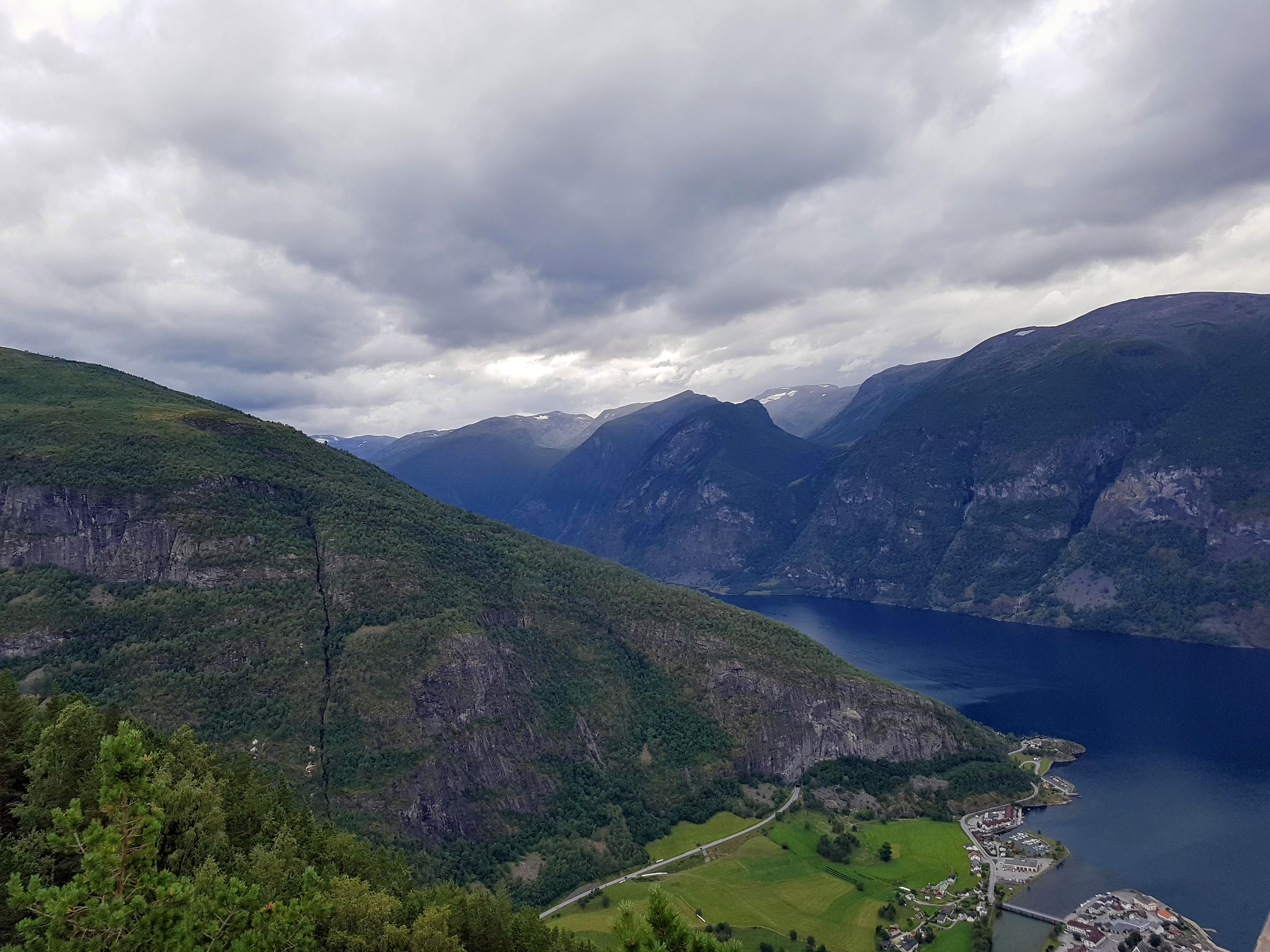
Aurlandsfjord as seen from Stegastein viewpoint
