= List of highways numbered 663 =

The following highways are numbered 663:

== Canada ==
- Highway 663
- Highway 663

== Norway ==
- Norwegian County Road 663

== United States ==
- LA 663
- MD 663 (former)
- PA 663
- PR-663
- FM 663

Preceded by 662	Lists of highways 663	Succeeded by 664
