= Viddalsdammen =

Lake in Vestland, Norway

- Fretheimsdalsvatnet; Viddalsvatnet; Liverdalsvatnet
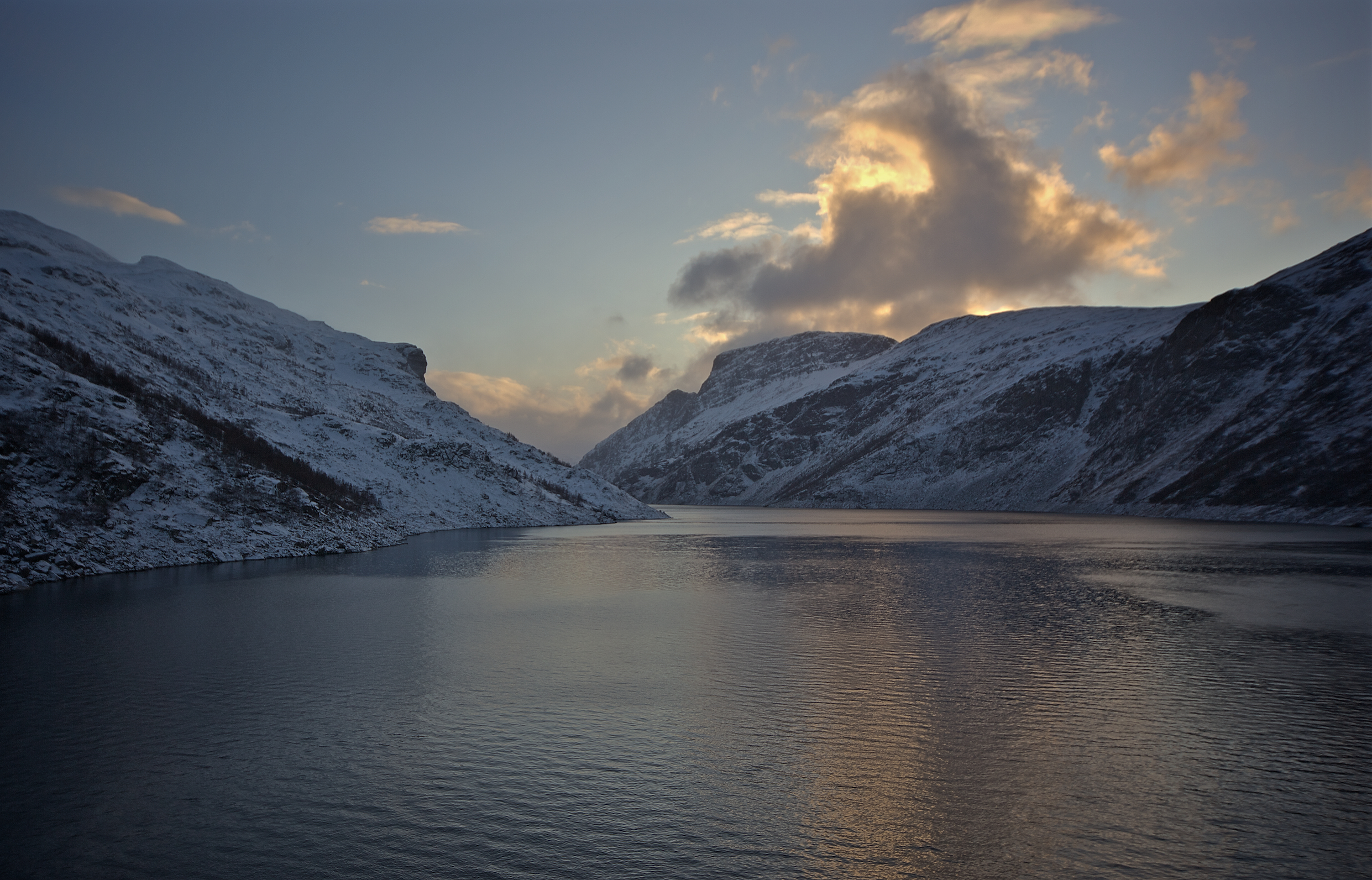
- Interactive map of Viddalsdammen
- Location: Aurland Municipality, Vestland
- Coordinates: 60.79115°N 7.23775°E
- Basin countries: Norway
- Surface area: 4.13 km^{2} (1.59 sq mi)
- Surface elevation: 868 to 930 metres (2,848 to 3,051 ft)
- References: NVE

Viddalsdammen (lit. 'The Viddal Dam') is a lake and a reservoir in Aurland Municipality in Vestland county, Norway. The reservoir has an area of 4.13-square-kilometre (1.59 sq mi) and the elevation varies between 930 metres (3,050 ft) and 868 m (2,848 ft) above sea level. Viddalsdammen is located at the end of the Låvisdalen valley, about 11 kilometres (6.8 mi) southeast of the village of Aurlandsvangen, about 7 kilometres (4.3 mi) southeast of the village of Flåm, and about 6 kilometres (3.7 mi) northeast of Myrdal Station.

== History ==
The reservoir was formed as part of the building of the Aurland Hydroelectric Power Station in the 1960s and 1970s when a rock-fill dam was built at the end of the lake Viddalsvatnet. After damming the level of Viddalsvatnet was raised to include the two upstream lakes Liverdalsvatnet and Fretheimsdalsvatnet, and they now form one 8-kilometre (5.0 mi) long contiguous lake. Viddalsdammen receives water through an extensive system of water tunnels that extends around the entire Aurlandsdalen valley.

== See also ==
- List of lakes in Norway
