= Norwegian County Road 258 =

Norwegian road

Coordinates: 61°58′19.93″N 7°26′20.82″E

County Road 258
- Gamle Strynefjellsvegen

Route information
- Length: 27 km (17 mi)
- Existed: 1894–present
- Restrictions: Closed in winter October-June; Limit on length and weight. Trailers not permitted.

Major junctions
- East end: Rv15 at Grotli
- West end: Rv15 at Ospeli

Location
- Country: Norway
- Counties: Vestland, Innlandet

Highway system
- Roads in Norway; National Roads; County Roads

County Road 258 (Norwegian: Fylkesvei 258), also known as Gamle Strynefjellsvegen, is a 27-kilometre (17 mi) long road that runs through the Videdalen valley between the village of Grotli in Skjåk Municipality and the village of Ospeli in Stryn Municipality. The road opened in 1894, but was replaced by National Road 15 in 1977 as the main route between the Nordfjord region and Eastern Norway. The road is closed from October to June and is designated one of eighteen National Tourist Routes in Norway. The Tystigbreen glacier lies just south of the road. The eastern part of road has a gravel surface as a heritage road. The road is very narrow, only about 3.5–4.5 metres (11–15 ft). Starting in 2019, there is a more strict vehicle length limit of 8 metres (26 ft) and a weight limit of 8 tonnes (7.9 long tons; 8.8 short tons) per axle, due to maintenance issues, which means that tourist buses are not permitted on the road anymore.

== Media gallery ==
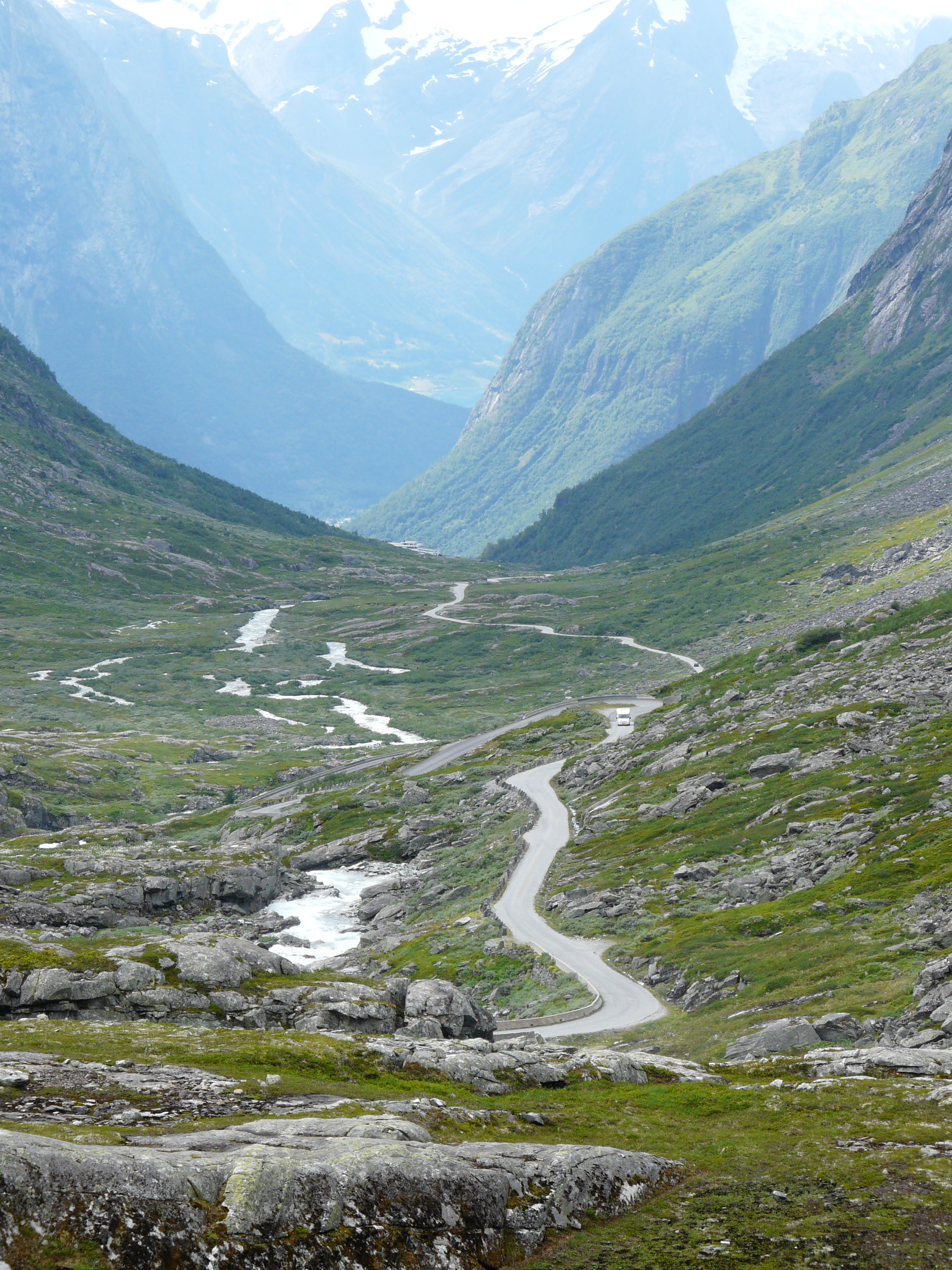
View of the roadway

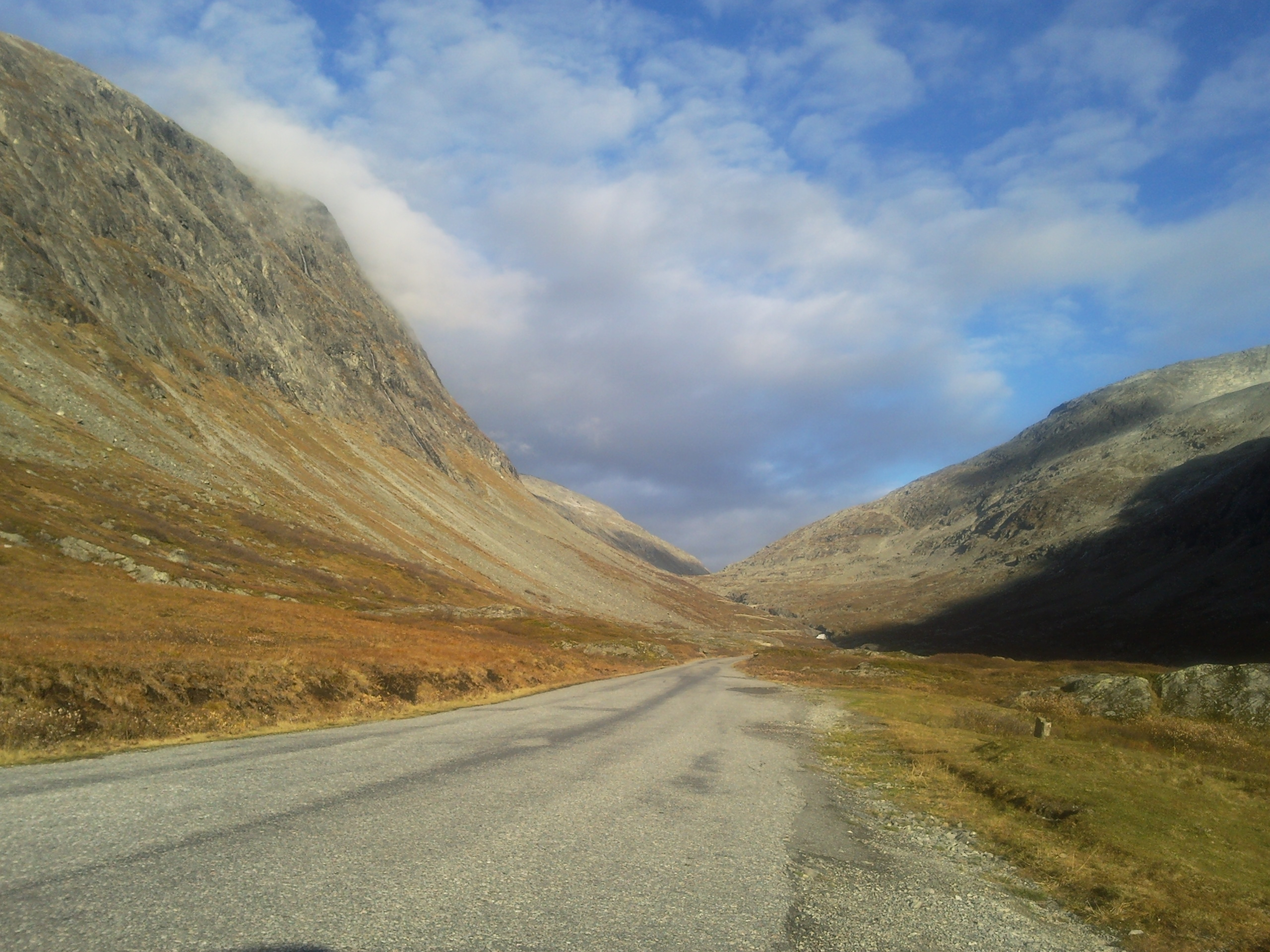
View of the roadway

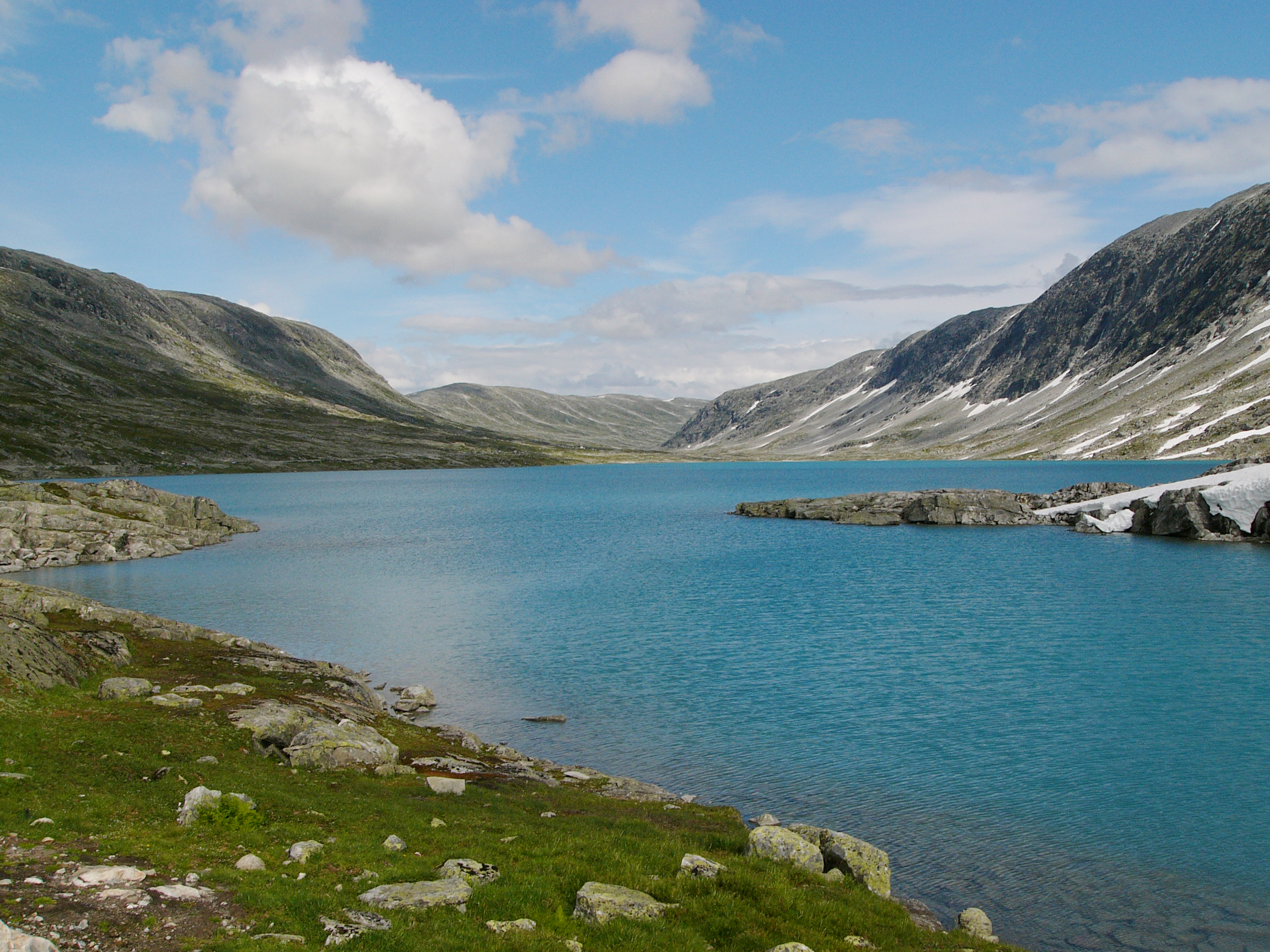
View of the scenery around the road

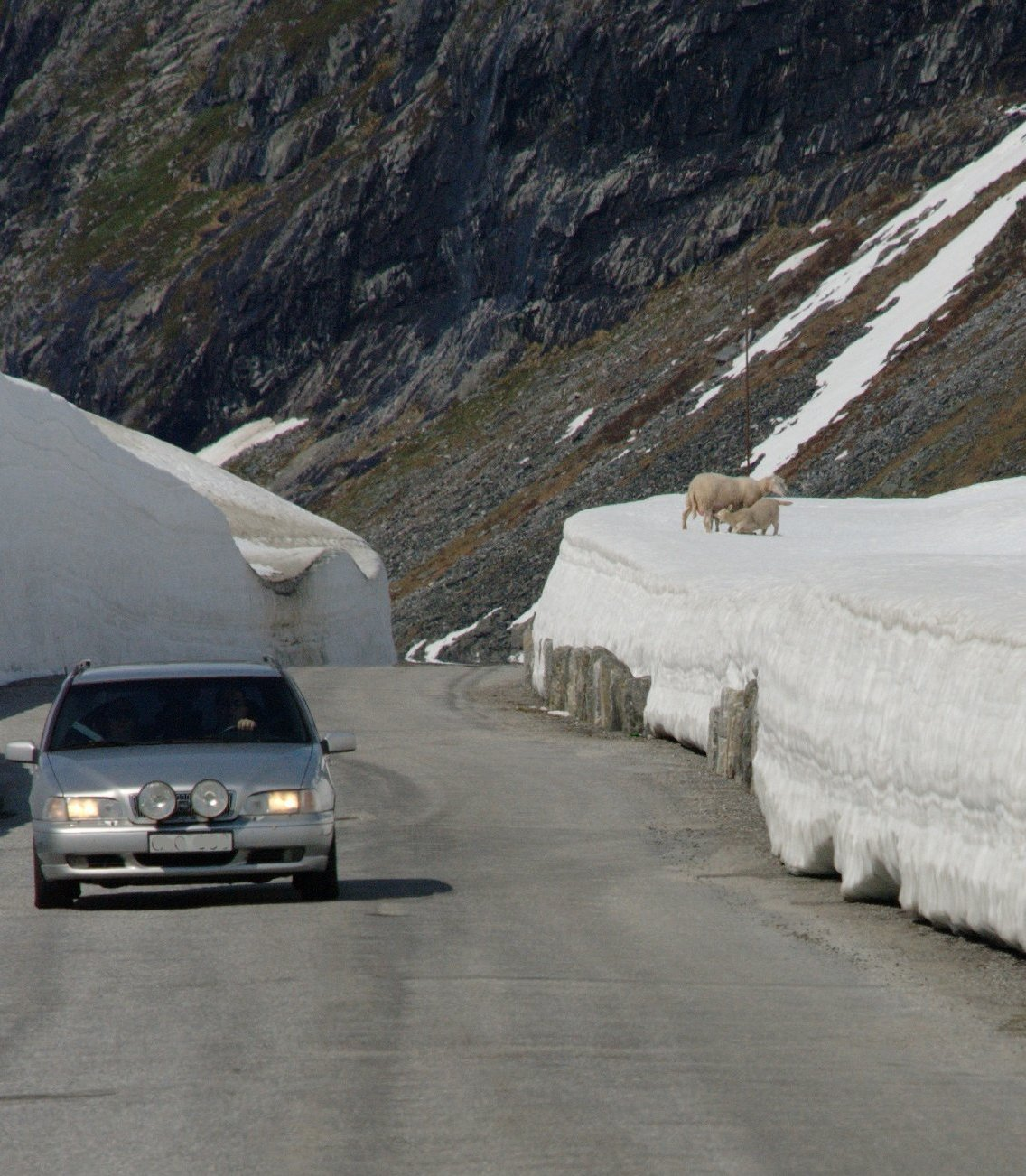
A car, snow, and sheep
