= Norwegian County Road 889 =

Road in Finnmark, Norway

County Road 889

Route information
- Length: 85.3 km (53.0 mi)

Major junctions
- South end: E69 at Smørfjord
- North end: Havøysund

Location
- Country: Norway
- Counties: Finnmark
- Major cities: Havøysund

Highway system
- Roads in Norway; National Roads; County Roads

County Road 889 (Norwegian: Fylkesvei 889) is 85.3 kilometers (53.0 mi) long and runs between the villages of Smørfjord and Havøysund in Finnmark, Norway. The road runs through Porsanger Municipality, Hammerfest Municipality and Måsøy Municipality, and passes the small villages of Kokelv, Selkop, Lillefjord, Latter, Slåtten, Snefjord, Krokelv and Bakfjord. At Smørfjord, the road branches from E69. It crosses to Havøysund across the Havøysund Bridge. The section from Kokelv to Havøysund is designated one of eighteen National Tourist Routes in Norway.

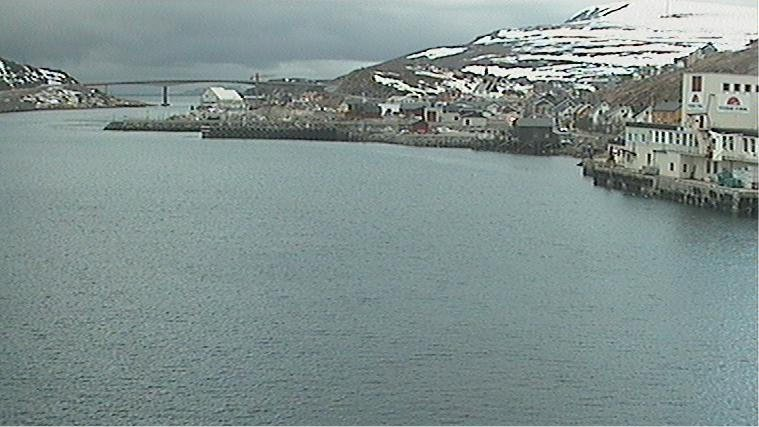
Havøysund and the Havøysund Bridge

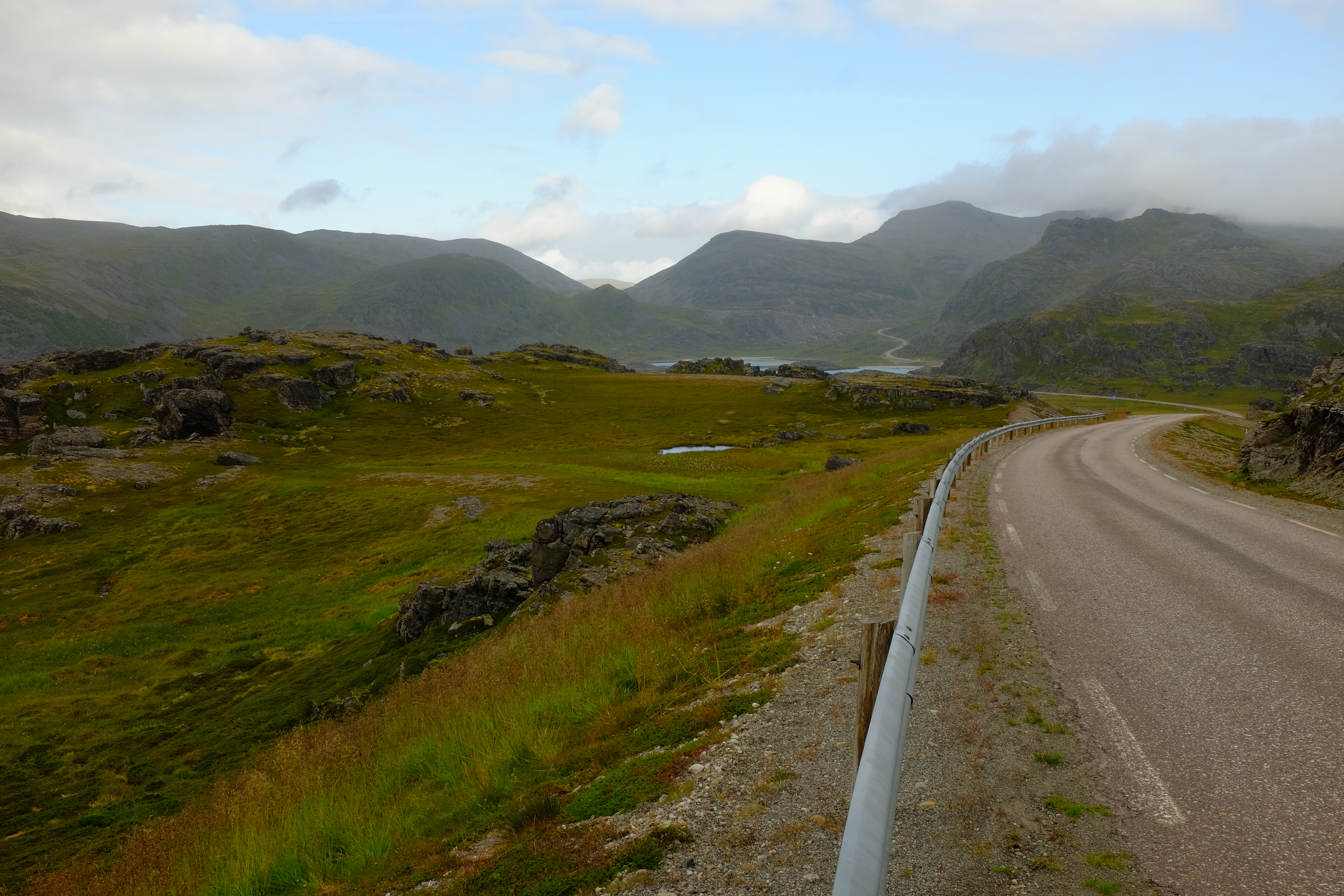
A section of the road in Måsøy Municipality
