= Norwegian County Road 663 =

Road in Norway

Coordinates: 62°51′14″N 7°12′09″E

County Road 663

Route information
- Length: 31.9 km (19.8 mi)

Major junctions
- North end: Fv64 in Mjølkstølen
- Fv664 in Eidem
- South end: Fv64 in Moen

Location
- Country: Norway
- Counties: Møre og Romsdal
- Major cities: Hustadvika Municipality

Highway system
- Roads in Norway; National Roads; County Roads

County Road 663 (Norwegian: Fylkesvei 663) is a two-lane highway in Hustadvika Municipality in Møre og Romsdal county, Norway. The highway runs between Moen and Mjølkestølen. At both termini it has an intersection with County Road 64. Part of the road has been designated as one of eighteen National Tourist Routes in Norway.
