= List of highways numbered 666 =

The following highways are numbered 666:

== Belgium ==
- The pilgrimage centre of Banneux in Belgium is located on the N666 road.

== Canada ==
- Alberta Highway 666
- Ontario Highway 666 (former)

== Ireland ==
- R666

== Italy ==
- Strada regionale 666 di Sora (formerly strada statale 666 di Sora)

== Netherlands ==
- Provinciale weg 666 NL Wiki Page

== Philippines ==
- N666 highway (Philippines)

== Sweden ==
- Länsväg 666, in Uppland, eastbound from Alunda. Z 666 Wiki SV

== United Kingdom ==
- A666 road

== United States ==
- U.S. Route 666 (former, renumbered in 2003 to US 191 and US 491)
- Florida State Road 666
- Maryland Route 666 (former)
- Ohio State Route 666
- Pennsylvania Route 666
- Puerto Rico Highway 666
- Farm to Market Road 666
- Virginia State Highway 666

Preceded by 665	Lists of highways 666	Succeeded by 667
