= Norwegian County Road 5627 =

Road in Norway

Coordinates: 60°57′46″N 7°21′40″E

County Road 5627
- Bokmål: Fylkesvei 5627; Nynorsk: Fylkesveg 5627
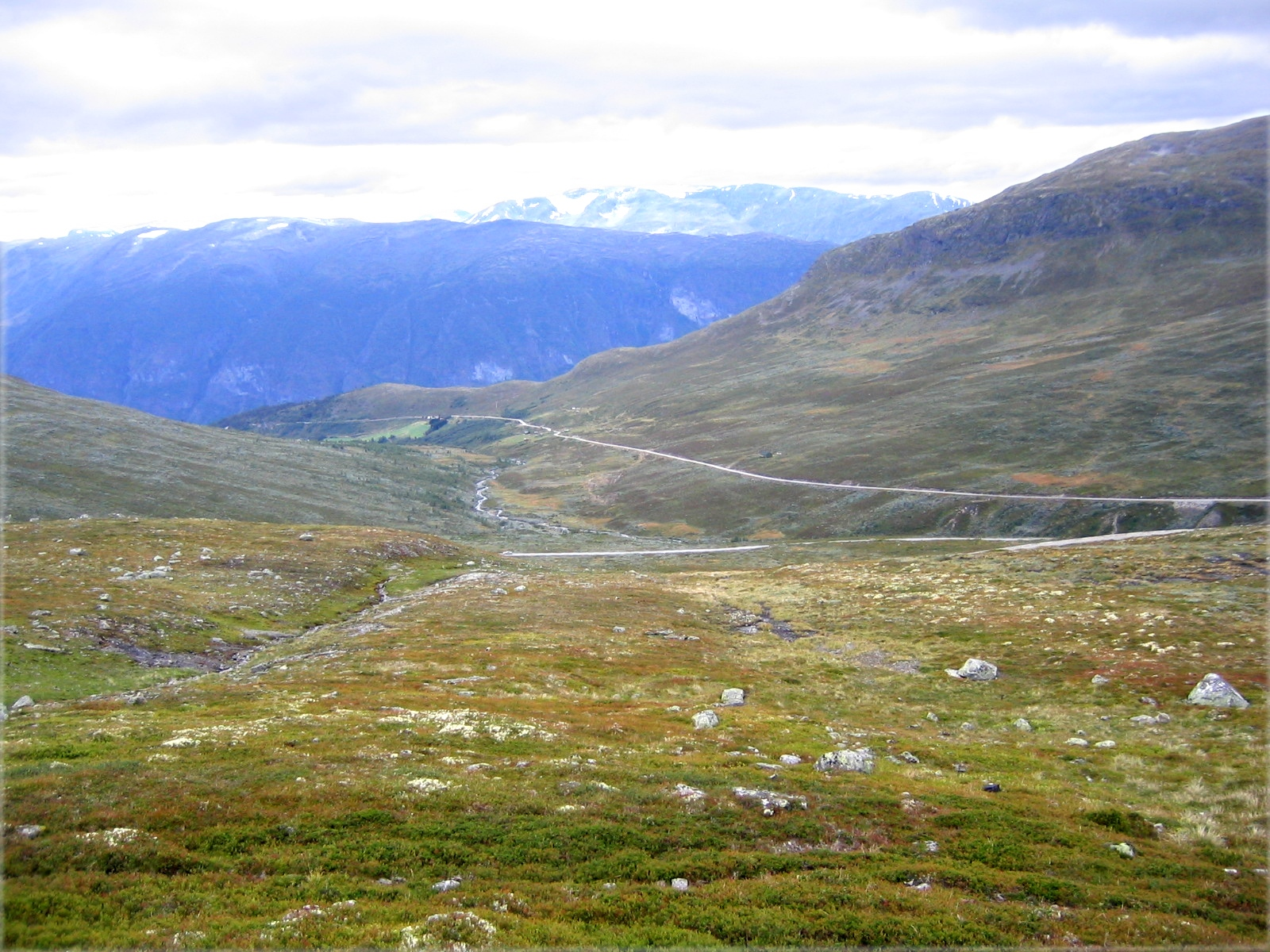

Route information
- Length: 48.6 km (30.2 mi)

Location
- Country: Norway

Highway system
- Roads in Norway; National Roads; County Roads

Norwegian County Road 5627 (Norwegian: Fylkesvei 5627) is a 48.6-kilometer (30.2 mi) long Norwegian county road which crosses the Aurlandsfjellet mountains from Aurlandsvangen to Lærdalsøyri. The route was replaced by the 24.51-kilometre (15.23 mi) long Lærdal Tunnel—the world's longest road tunnel. The barren mountain plateau offers views 600 m (2,000 ft) down on the Aurlandsfjord. It is designated a National Tourist Route in Norway.

Prior to the 2020 county merger, the road was called County Road 243, but after merging the counties, there were two county roads with the same number, so this one was changed.
