= List of highways numbered 665 =

The following highways are numbered 665:

== Canada ==
- Highway 665

== United States ==
- I-665 (former proposal)
- LA 665
- MD 665
- SR 665
- PR-665
- FM 665

Preceded by 664	Lists of highways 665	Succeeded by 666
