= Kvinnefossen =

Waterfall in Vestland, Norway

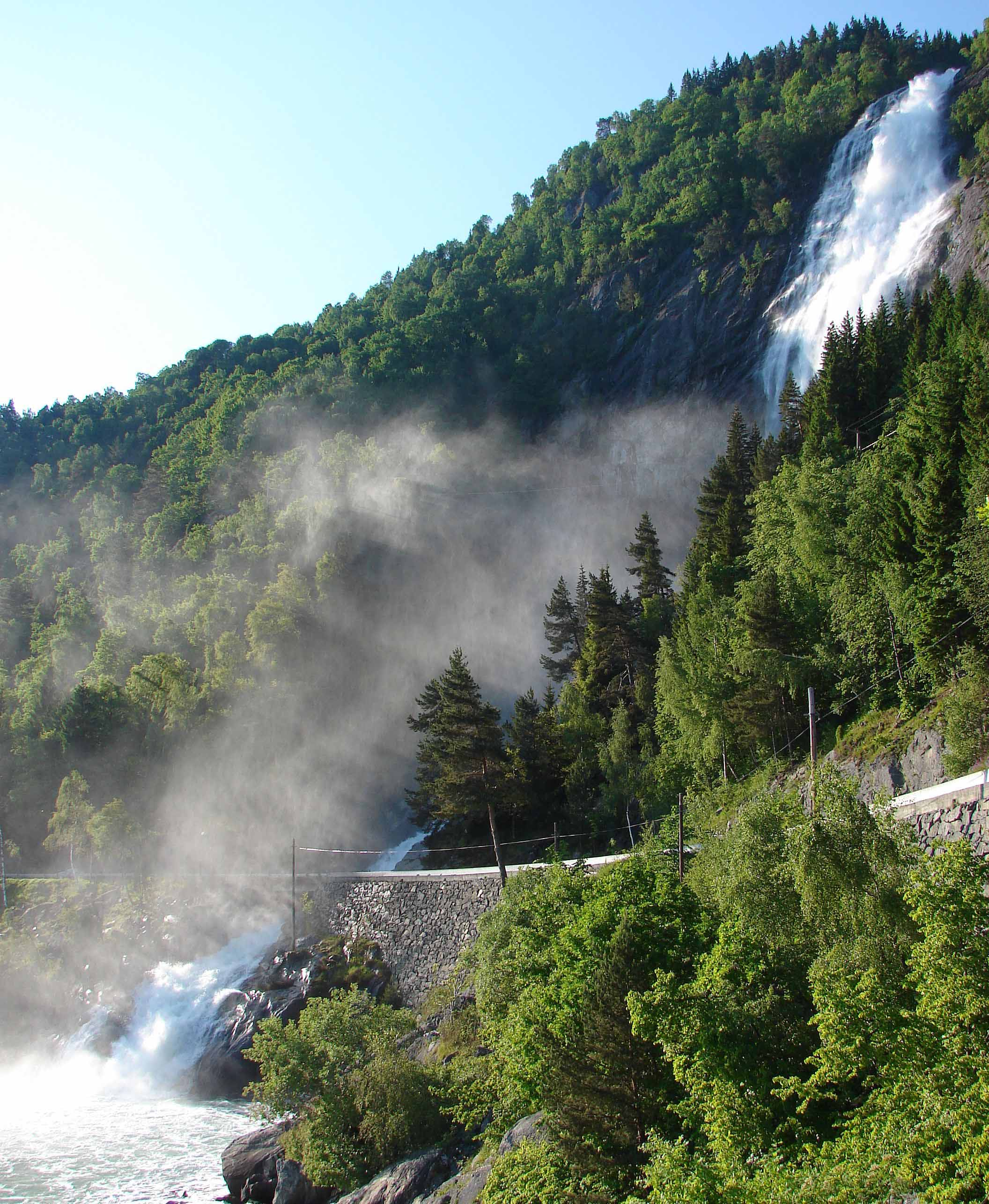
- Interactive map of Kvinnefossen
- Location: Vestland, Norway
- Coordinates: 61.2099°N 6.6477°E
- Type: Horsetail
- Total height: 200 metres (660 ft)
- Number of drops: 1
- Longest drop: 200 metres (660 ft)
- Watercourse: Kvinna

Kvinnefossen (sometimes spelled Kvinnafossen; locally called Kvinnao) is a waterfall of the river Kvinna in Sogndal Municipality in Vestland county, Norway. County Road 55 runs right past the 200-metre (660 ft) falls.

The river and waterfall area is a protected environmental area and thus preventing a dam from being built for hydroelectric power production.

== Name ==
The name Kvinnefossen (or Kvinnao as it is called locally) is said to come from a legend about a woman who fell over the waterfall and died. Also, it is said that the rocky cliffs down towards the sea at a particular water level, the water takes on the shape of a woman's figure. When they built the road to Hella, there was a lot of landslides at the site, and this may have led to a change in the river course so that the woman's figure is no longer visible. In Norwegian, kvinna means "the woman" and fossen means "the waterfall".

Others claim that the name comes from the Nynorsk word kvin, which means a "screeching" or "whining" sound, and that the waterfall was called Kvinefossen because it is said that under certain weather conditions, a loud sound can be heard from the water in the waterfall.

== Tourist attraction ==
Kvinnefossen is a spectacular waterfall to see, especially when the water level is high. When the waterfall hits the bottom of the drop, it creates a large spray which goes out towards the bridge on the road below. The waterfall is clearly visible from Vangsnes on the other side of the fjord, and from boats on the fjord. The Norwegian Public Roads Administration built a parking lot right just before the bridge so that people can stop to look at and take pictures of the waterfall.

== See also ==
- List of waterfalls
