= List of highways numbered 664 =

The following highways are numbered 664:

== Canada ==
- Highway 664

== United States ==
- I-664
- LA 664
- MD 664 (former)
- SR 664
- PA 664
- PR-664
- FM 664

Preceded by 663	Lists of highways 664	Succeeded by 665
