= Aurland Stadion =

Sports venue in Aurland, Vestland, Norway

Coordinates: 60.9041°N 7.1965°E

Aurland Stadion is a multi-purpose stadium in the village of Aurlandsvangen which is located in Aurland Municipality, Vestland county, Norway. Built in 1960, it received all-weather running track in 1985 and was last renovated in 1992. The track is 400 meters (1,312 ft) long and has four tracks.

Sogndal Fotball played a home match at Aurland Stadion in 1998.
