= Sognefjellet =

Mountainous area in Norway

Sognefjellet Dølafjell
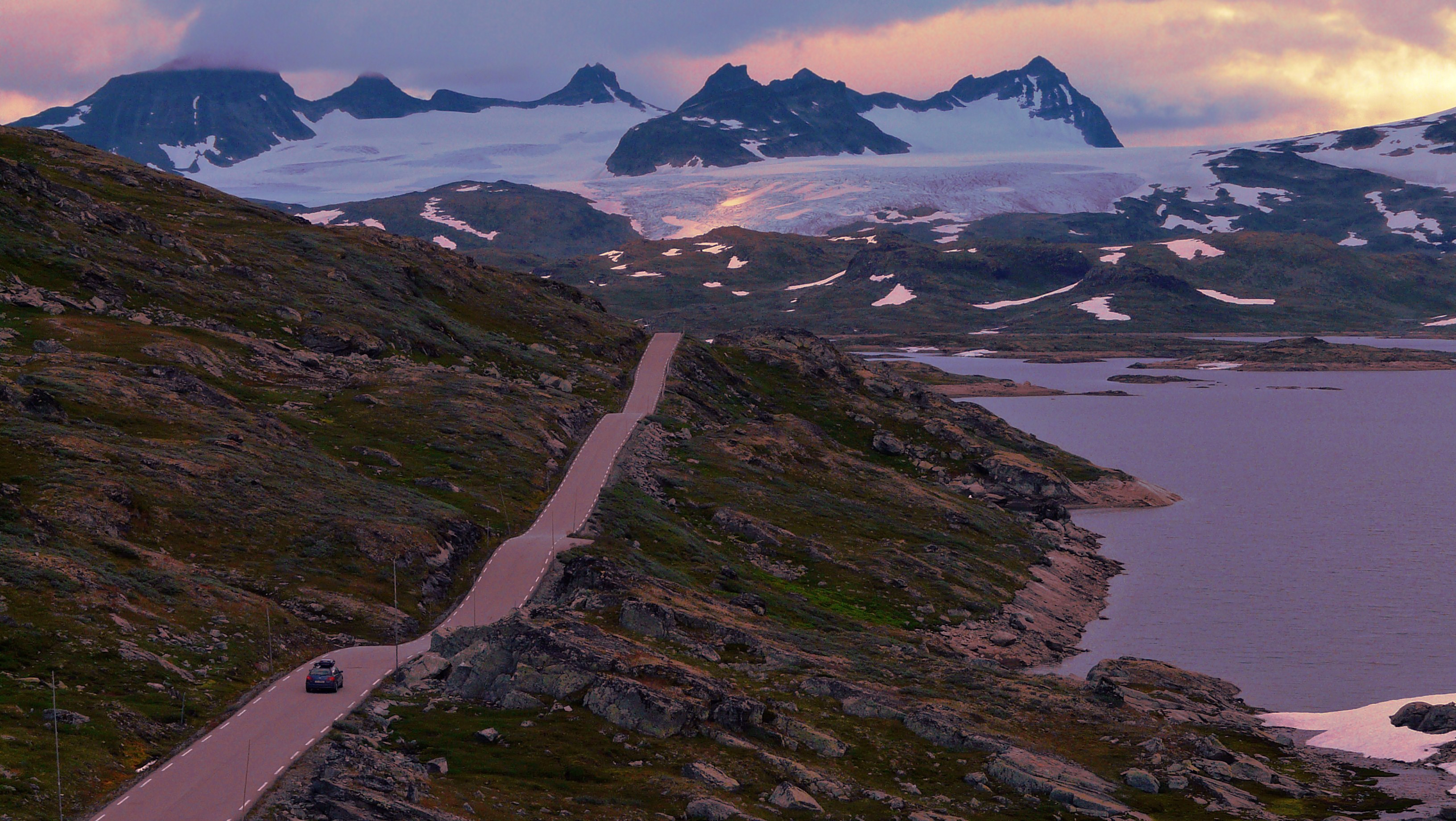
- County Road 55 runs through the pass
- Interactive map of Sognefjellet; Dølafjell

Third Approach
- Location: Innlandet and Vestland, Norway
- Coordinates: 61.56°N 7.99°E

Sognefjellet (lit. 'Sogn Mountains') or Dølafjell is a mountainous area and mountain pass which connects Lustrafjorden and its surrounding valley with the Ottadalen valley in the Jotunheimen area. Sognefjellet is located in Luster Municipality (in Vestland county) and Lom Municipality (in Innlandet county) in Norway. Sognefjellsvegen, part of County Road 55, runs through the mountains and over the pass.

== Climate ==
Climate data for Sognefjellshytta 1991-2020 (1413 m / 4636 ft ASL)
| Month | Jan | Feb | Mar | Apr | May | Jun | Jul | Aug | Sep | Oct | Nov | Dec | Year |
|---|---|---|---|---|---|---|---|---|---|---|---|---|---|
| Mean daily maximum °C (°F) | −6.4 (20.5) | −7.2 (19.0) | −5.3 (22.5) | −0.4 (31.3) | 3.4 (38.1) | 7.9 (46.2) | 10.6 (51.1) | 10.3 (50.5) | 5.4 (41.7) | 0.4 (32.7) | −3.3 (26.1) | −6.5 (20.3) | 0.7 (33.3) |
| Daily mean °C (°F) | −8.6 (16.5) | −9.1 (15.6) | −8.1 (17.4) | −4.3 (24.3) | −0.1 (31.8) | 3.9 (39.0) | 7.4 (45.3) | 6.8 (44.2) | 2.9 (37.2) | −2.0 (28.4) | −5.5 (22.1) | −8.3 (17.1) | −2.1 (28.2) |
| Mean daily minimum °C (°F) | −10.9 (12.4) | −11.9 (10.6) | −11.1 (12.0) | −8.1 (17.4) | −3.2 (26.2) | 0.3 (32.5) | 4.8 (40.6) | 3.9 (39.0) | 0.7 (33.3) | −4.5 (23.9) | −7.6 (18.3) | −10.5 (13.1) | −4.8 (23.3) |
Source: seklima.met.no
