= Eidem =

Eidem is a surname. Notable people with the surname include:

- Ane Eidem (born 1993), Norwegian handballer
- Bjarne Mørk Eidem (1936–2022), Norwegian politician
- Erling Eidem (1880–1972), Swedish theologian and Lutheran archbishop
- Johan Lauritz Eidem (1891–1984), Norwegian politician
- Knut Eidem (1918–2009), Norwegian journalist and non-fiction writer
- Odd Eidem (1913–1988), Norwegian writer, journalist and literary critic
- Paul Lorck Eidem (1909–1992), Norwegian writer and illustrator
- Thomas Eidem (1859–1954), Norwegian schoolteacher and politician
