= Enden =

Neighborhood of Ringebu Municipality, Norway

Coordinates: 61.550°N 10.062°E

Enden is a neighborhood of Ringebu Municipality in Innlandet county, Norway. It is located where County Road 27 branches off from E6.
