= Norwegian County Road 55 =

Road in Innlandet and Vestland, Norway

Coordinates: 61°34′28″N 8°2′0″E

County Road 55
- Bokmål: Fylkesvei 55; Nynorsk: Fylkesveg 55
- Map of the road

Route information
- Length: 248.1 km (154.2 mi)

Location
- Country: Norway

Highway system
- Roads in Norway; National Roads; County Roads

County Road 55 (Norwegian: Fylkesvei 55) is a 248.1-kilometer-long (154.2 mi) highway which runs between Lom Municipality and Høyanger Municipality in Norway. The 108-kilometer (67 mi) section across Sognefjellet, known as Sognefjellsvegen, is designated a National Tourist Route. Also a short section from Balestrand to Norwegian County Road 613 is also a National Tourist Route over Gaularfjellet. The road reaches the highest elevation on the public road network in Norway, 1,434 meters (4,705 ft), and it is closed every winter.

Prior to 2010, the road was part of National Road 55 (Norwegian: Riksvei 55). The road has importance as part of the shortest route between Trondheim and Bergen, 636 kilometers (395 mi), including a ferry. Usually a faster route is used, like those including Road 51 (663 km, also closed in winter, no ferry), road 15 (701 km, one ferry, used by express buses), or European route E39 (671 km, four ferries). Local politicians lobby for two tunnels under the mountains, totalling around 50 kilometers (31 mi). This would create a winter open and ferry free road between Trondheim and Bergen much shorter than present alternatives.

== Media gallery ==
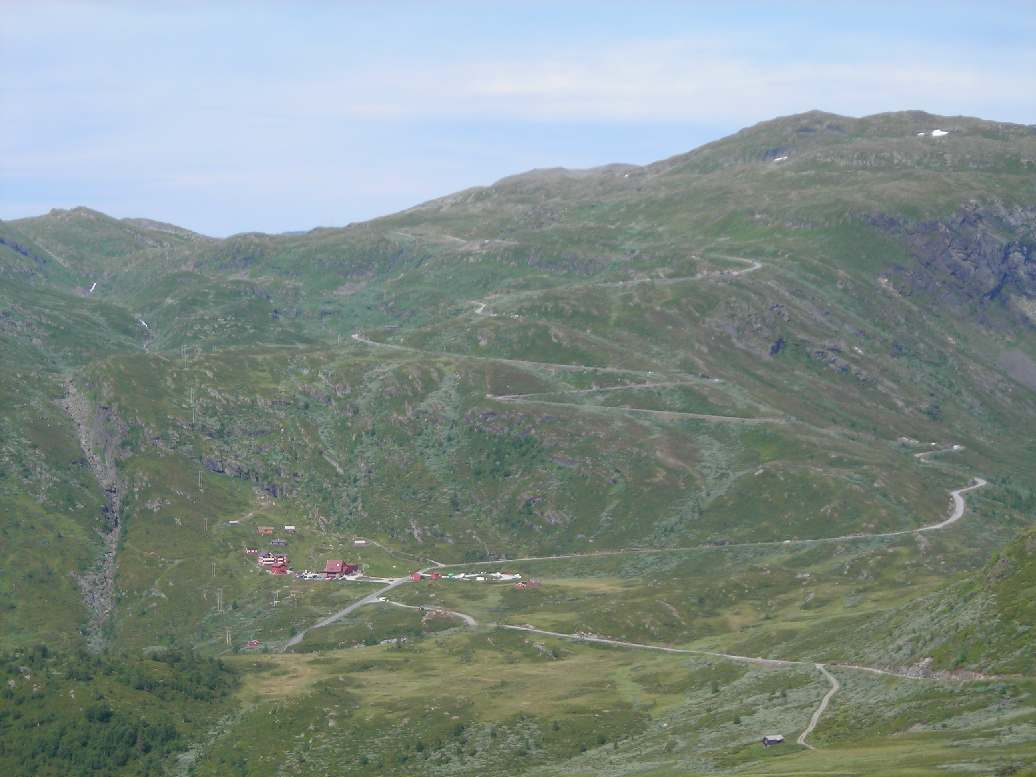
The road at Turtagrø

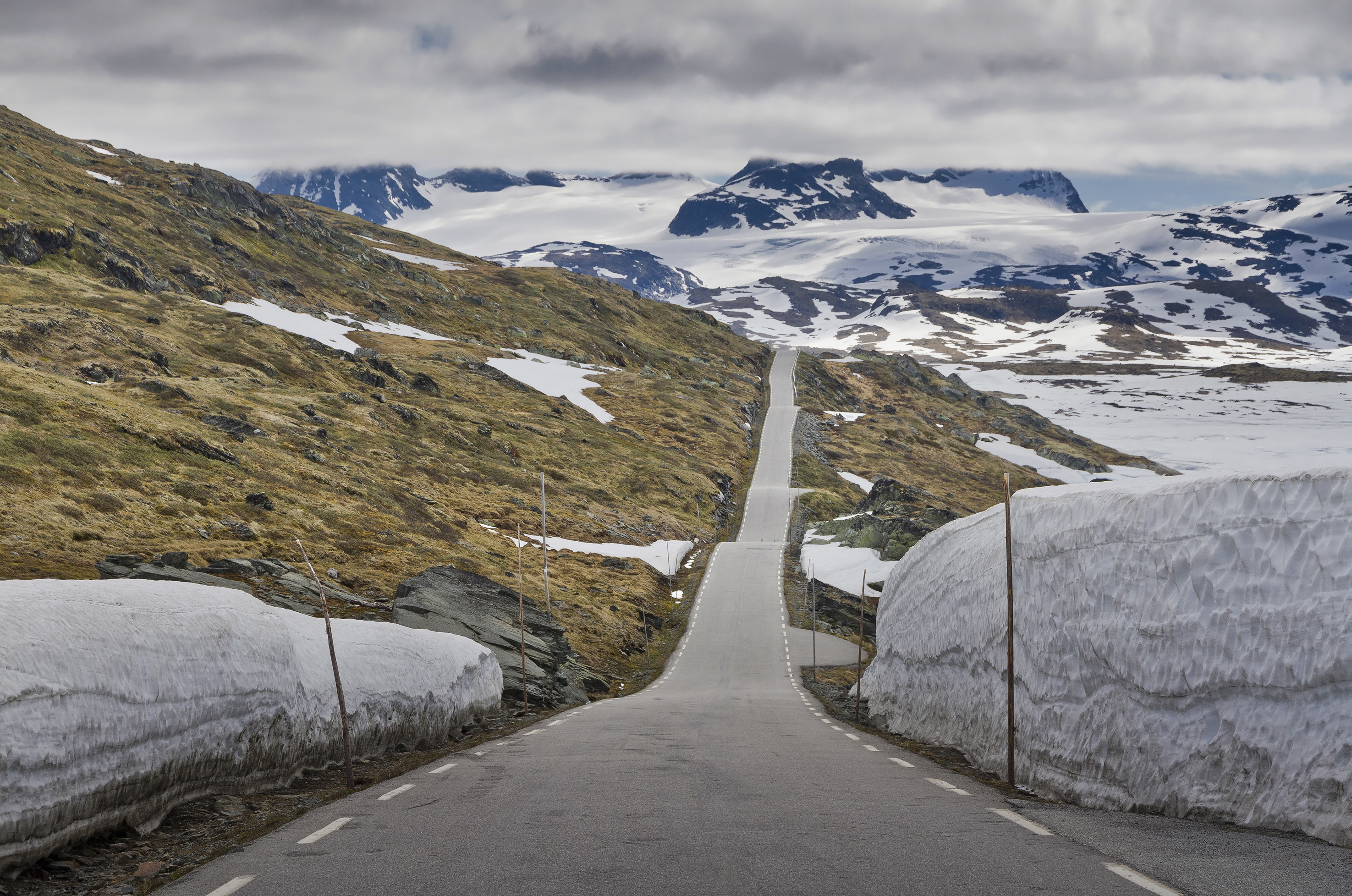
The road on Sognefjellet
