= Ospeli =

Area of Stryn Municipality, Norway

Coordinates: 61.93°N 7.26°E

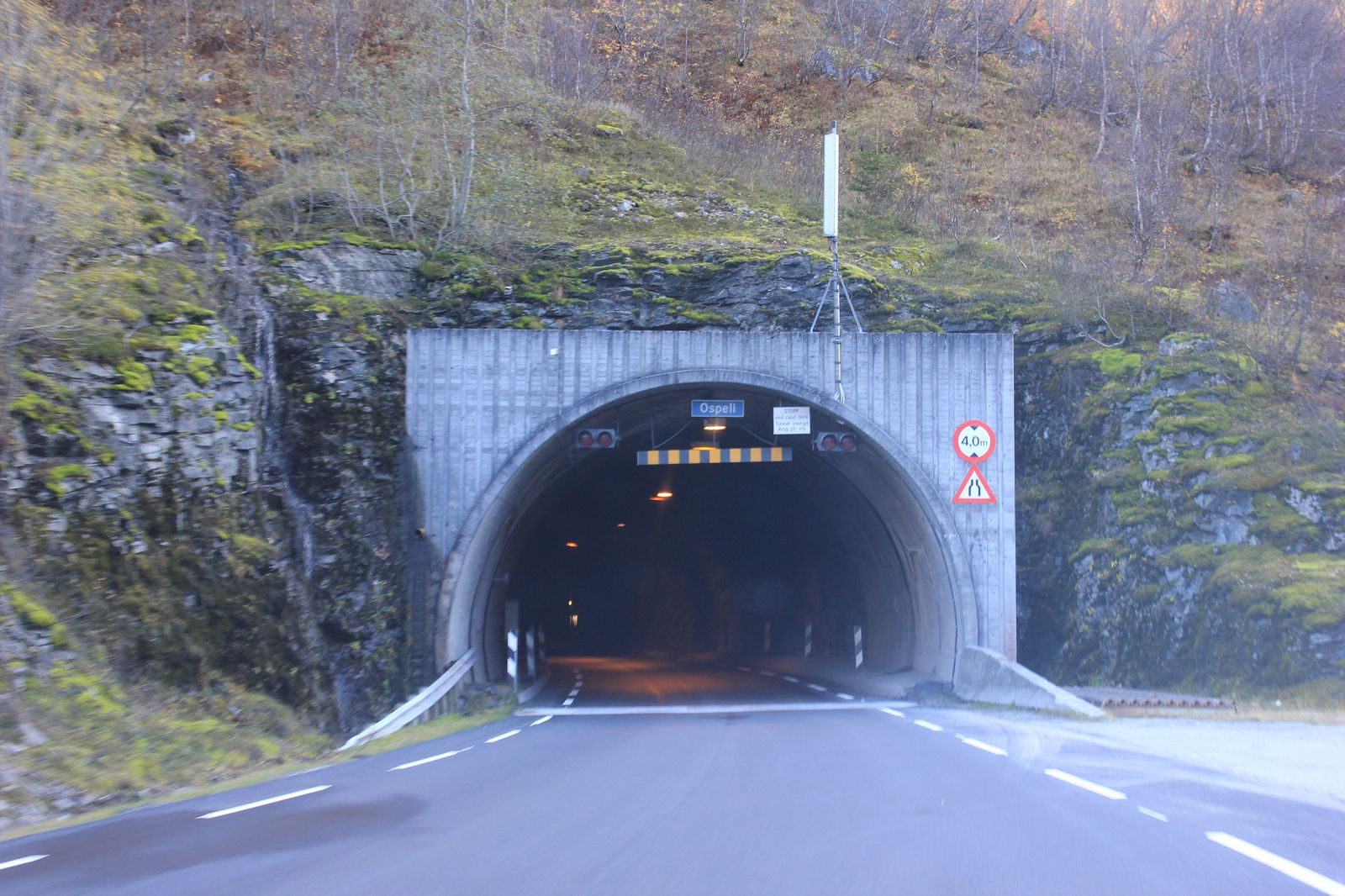
Opseli Tunnel

Ospeli is an area in Stryn Municipality in Vestland county, Norway. At Ospeli, Sogn og Fjordane County Road 258 branches off from National Road 15, with the latter running through the Ospeli Tunnel.
