= Aurland Hydroelectric Power Station =

Hydroelectric power station in Aurland municipality, Sogn og Fjordane county, Norway

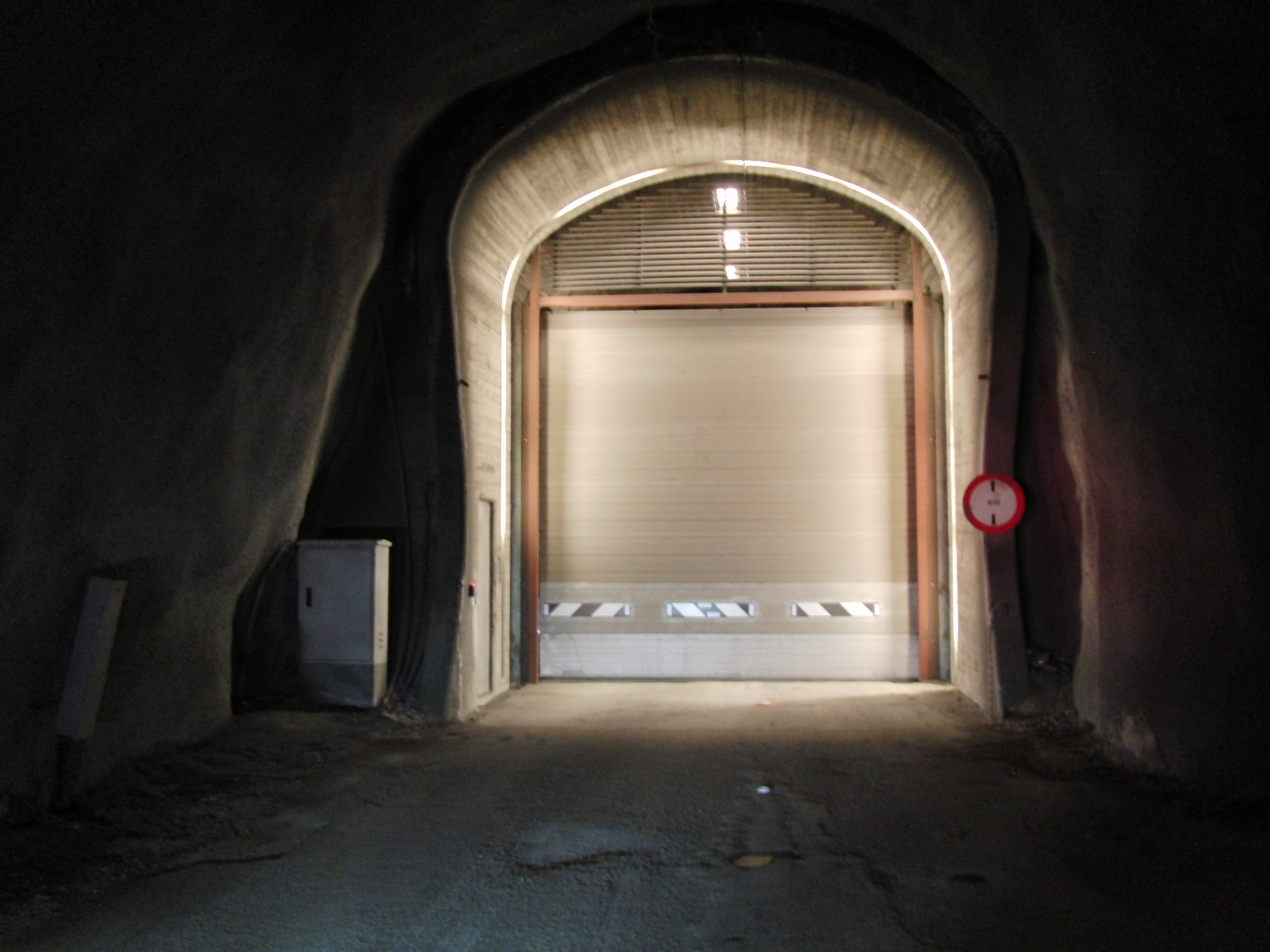
- Innkjøring er inne i Hagatunnelen på fylkesvei 50
- Official name: Aurland kraftverk
- Country: Norway
- Location: Aurland Municipality
- Coordinates: 60°51′18″N 7°18′17″E
- Status: Operational
- Construction began: 1969
- Commission date: 1973; 53 years ago
- Owner: E-CO Energi
- Operator: E-CO Energi

Tidal power station
- Tidal range: 850 m (2,790 ft); 870 m (2,850 ft)

Power generation
- Nameplate capacity: 1,128 MW
- Capacity factor: 29.0%
- Annual net output: 2,869 GW·h

The Aurland Power Station (Norwegian: Aurland kraftverk, Urban East Norwegian: [ˈæ̂ʉrlɑn ˈkrɑ̀ftværk]) is a hydroelectric power station located in Aurland Municipality in Vestland county, Norway. It is owned by E-CO Energi. It consists of five facilities, Aurland I, Aurland II, Aurland III, Reppa and Vangen. It operates at a combined installed capacity of 1,128 megawatts (1,513,000 hp), with an average annual production of 2,869 gigawatt-hours (10,330 TJ). The construction works were initiated in 1969, and the first production from Aurland I started in 1973.
