= Aurlandsfjord =

Fjord in Vestland, Norway

Aurlandsfjord Aurlandsfjorden
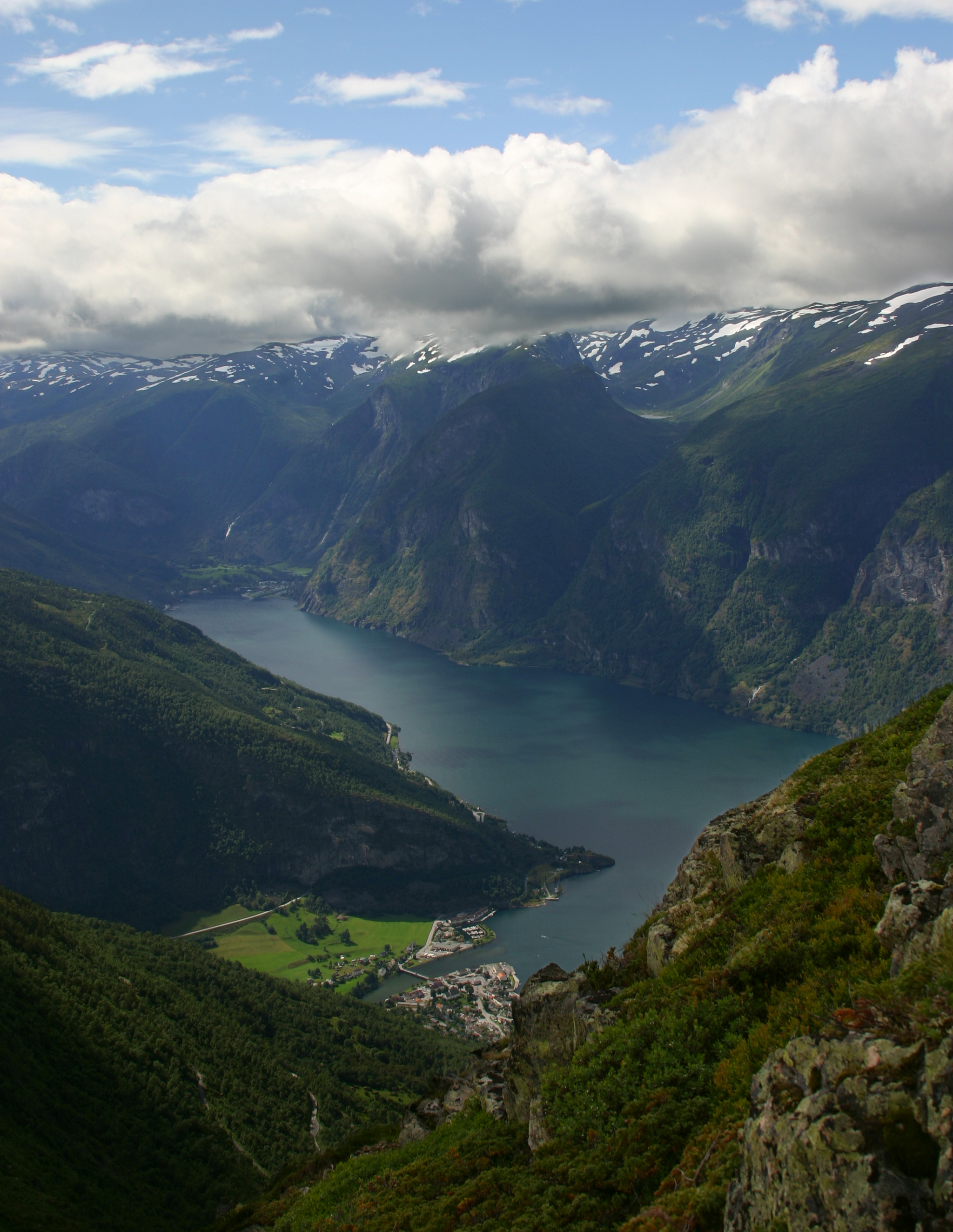
- View of the fjord
- Interactive map of Aurlandsfjord; Aurlandsfjorden
- Location: Vestland county, Norway
- Coordinates: 60.97284°N 7.07869°E
- Type: Fjord
- Primary inflows: Nærøyfjorden
- Primary outflows: Sognefjorden
- Basin countries: Norway
- Max. length: 29 kilometres (18 mi)
- Average depth: 962 metres (3,156 ft)
- Settlements: Aurlandsvangen, Flåm

Aurlandsfjord or Aurlandsfjorden (Urban East Norwegian: [ˈæ̂ʉrlɑnsˌfjuːɳ]) is a fjord in Vestland county, Norway. The fjord flows through Aurland Municipality, Vik Municipality, and Lærdal Municipality. The 29-kilometre (18 mi) long fjord is a branch off the main Sognefjorden, Norway's longest fjord. The fjord is deep and narrow, reaching a depth of about 962 metres (3,156 ft) below sea level, and its width is generally less than 2 kilometres (1.2 mi). About 11 kilometers (6.8 mi) south of the mouth of the fjord, the Nærøyfjord branches off from it to the west. The village of Flåm sits at the innermost part of the Aurlandsfjord; other villages along the fjord are Aurlandsvangen and Undredal. Most of the fjord is surrounded by up to 1,800-metre (5,900 ft) tall, steep mountains with little habitation along the fjord except for in a few small valleys.

Tremors of the 2011 Tōhoku earthquake and tsunami arrived 12 minutes later in Aurlandsfjord, causing 1.5-metre (4 ft 11 in) tall waves for a few hours.

Large parts of the fjord are included in the Nærøyfjord section of the West Norwegian Fjords UNESCO World Heritage Site.

== Gallery ==
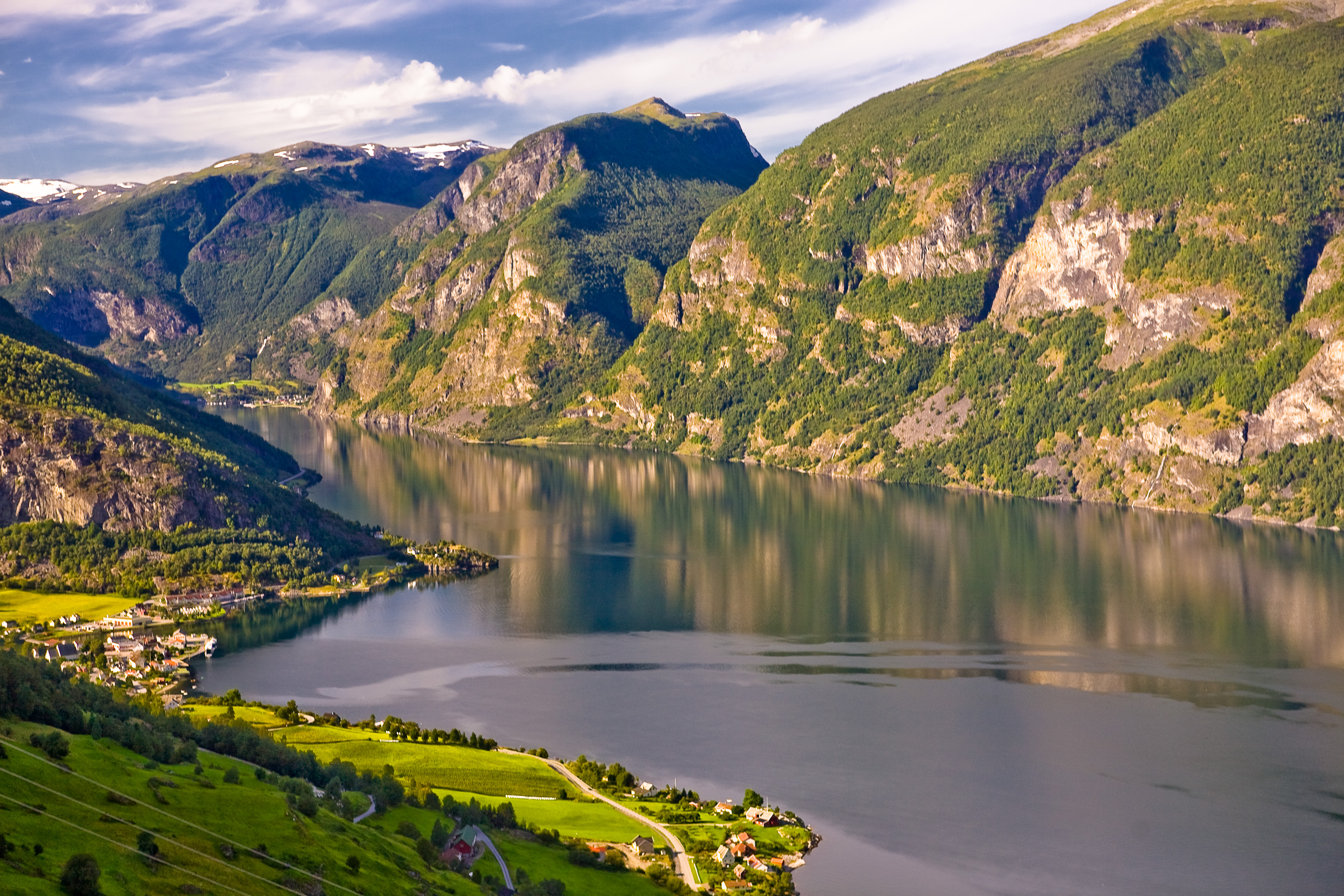
Aurlandsfjorden as seen from Aurland mountain road

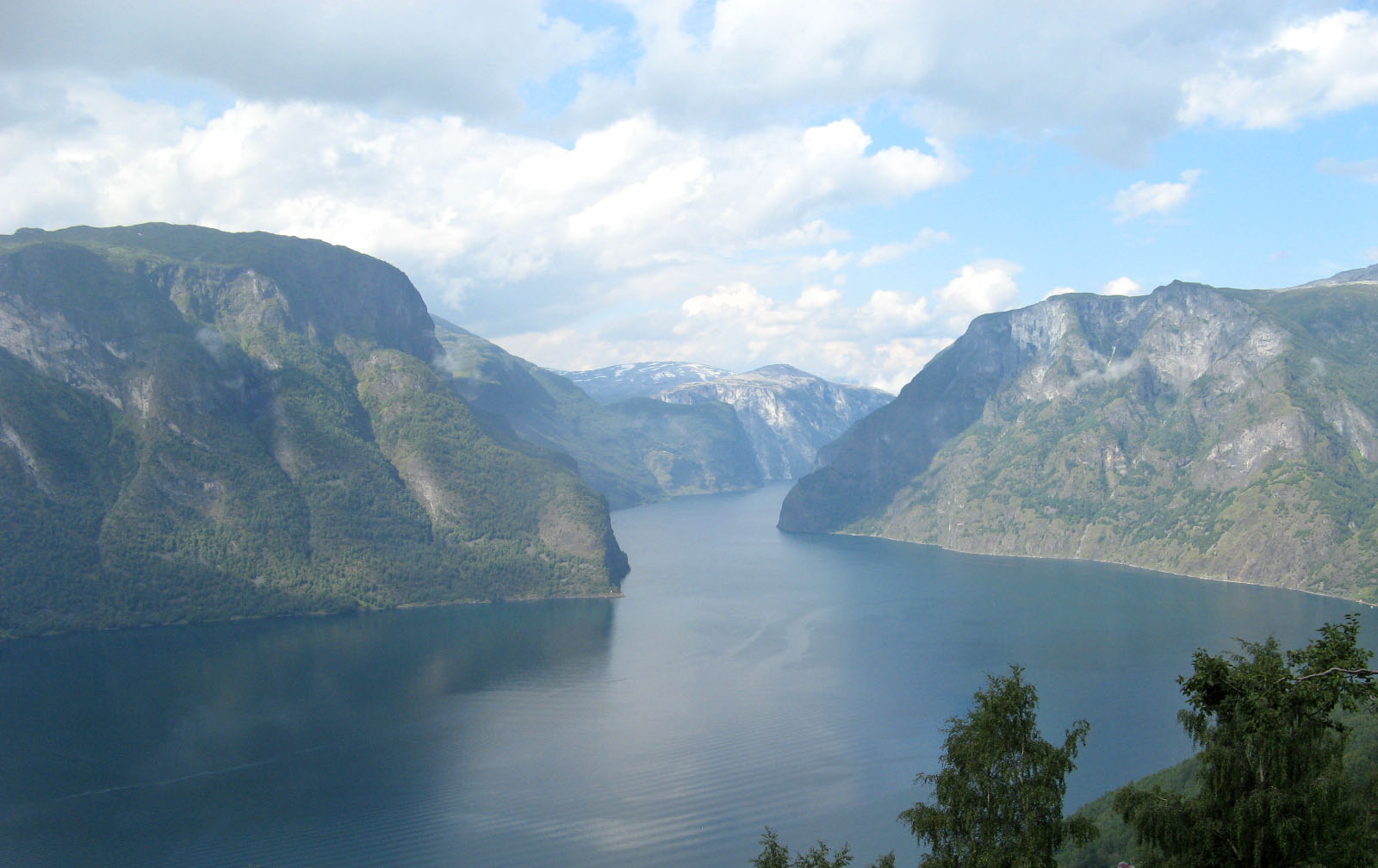
Seen north-northwest from Stegastein

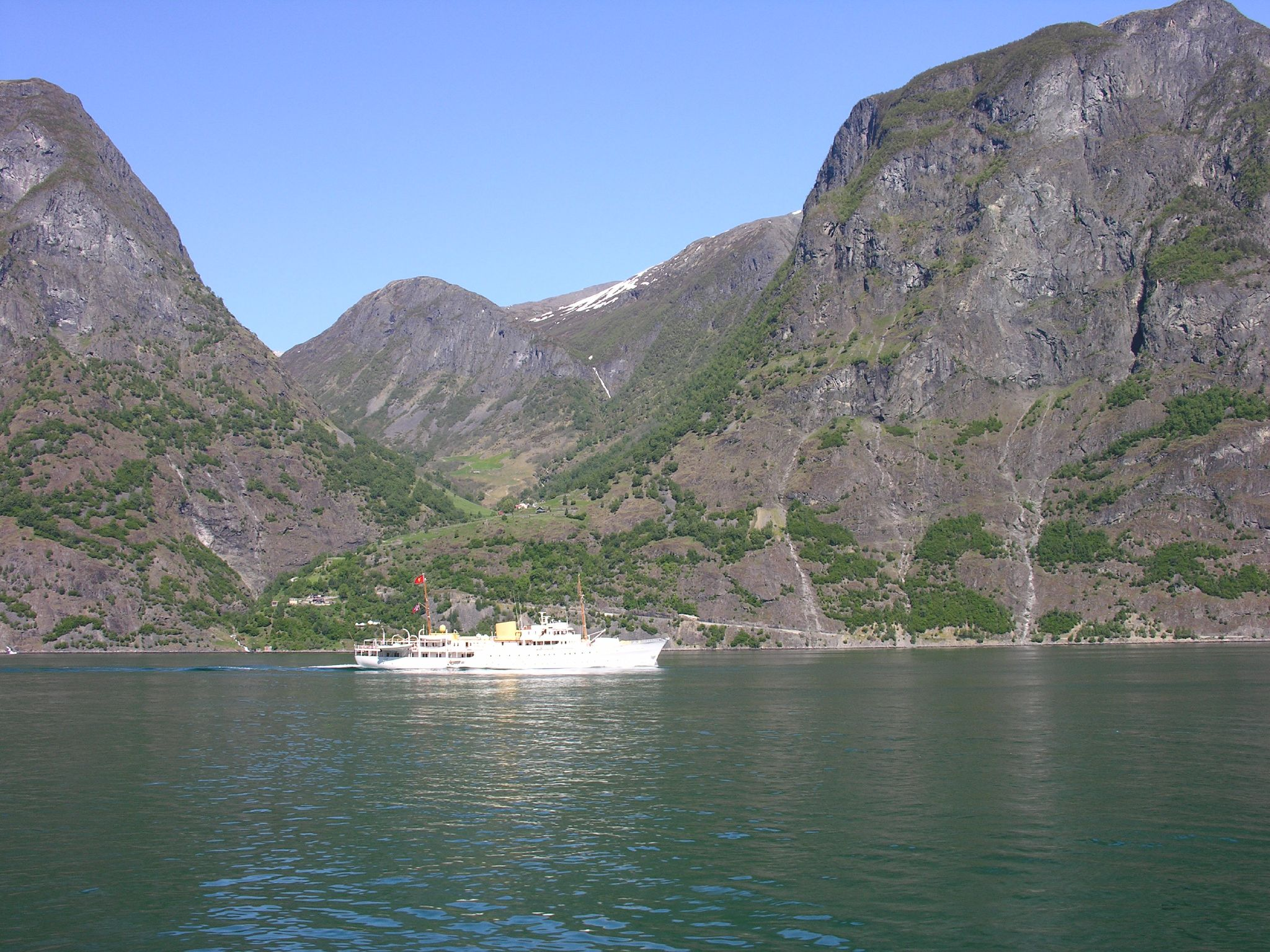
The royal yacht at Skjerdal

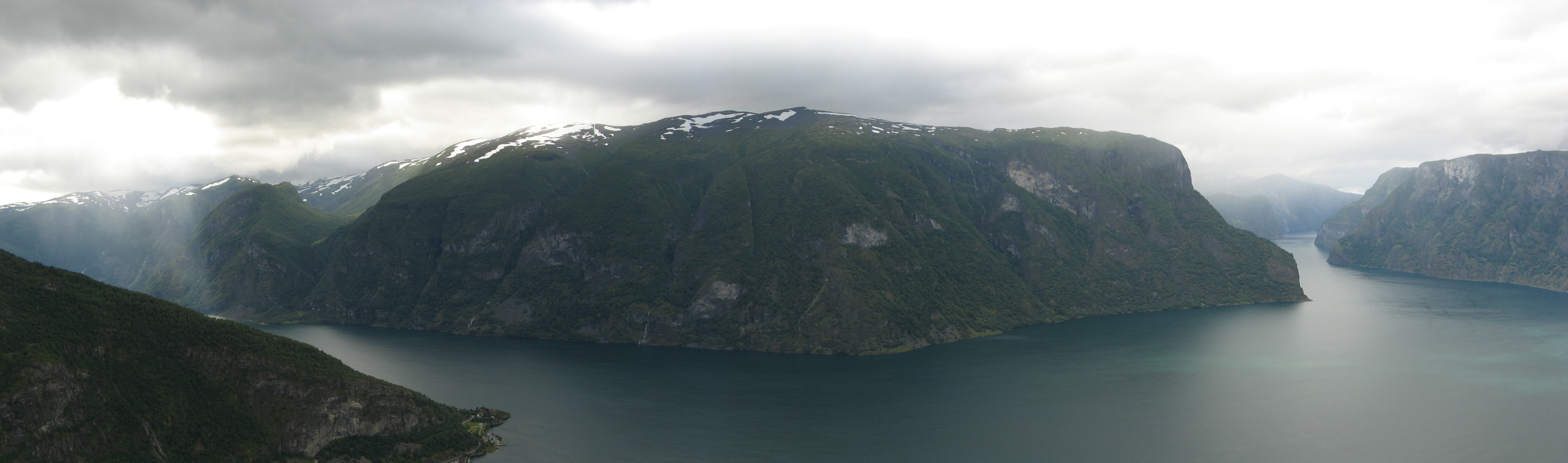
Panorama

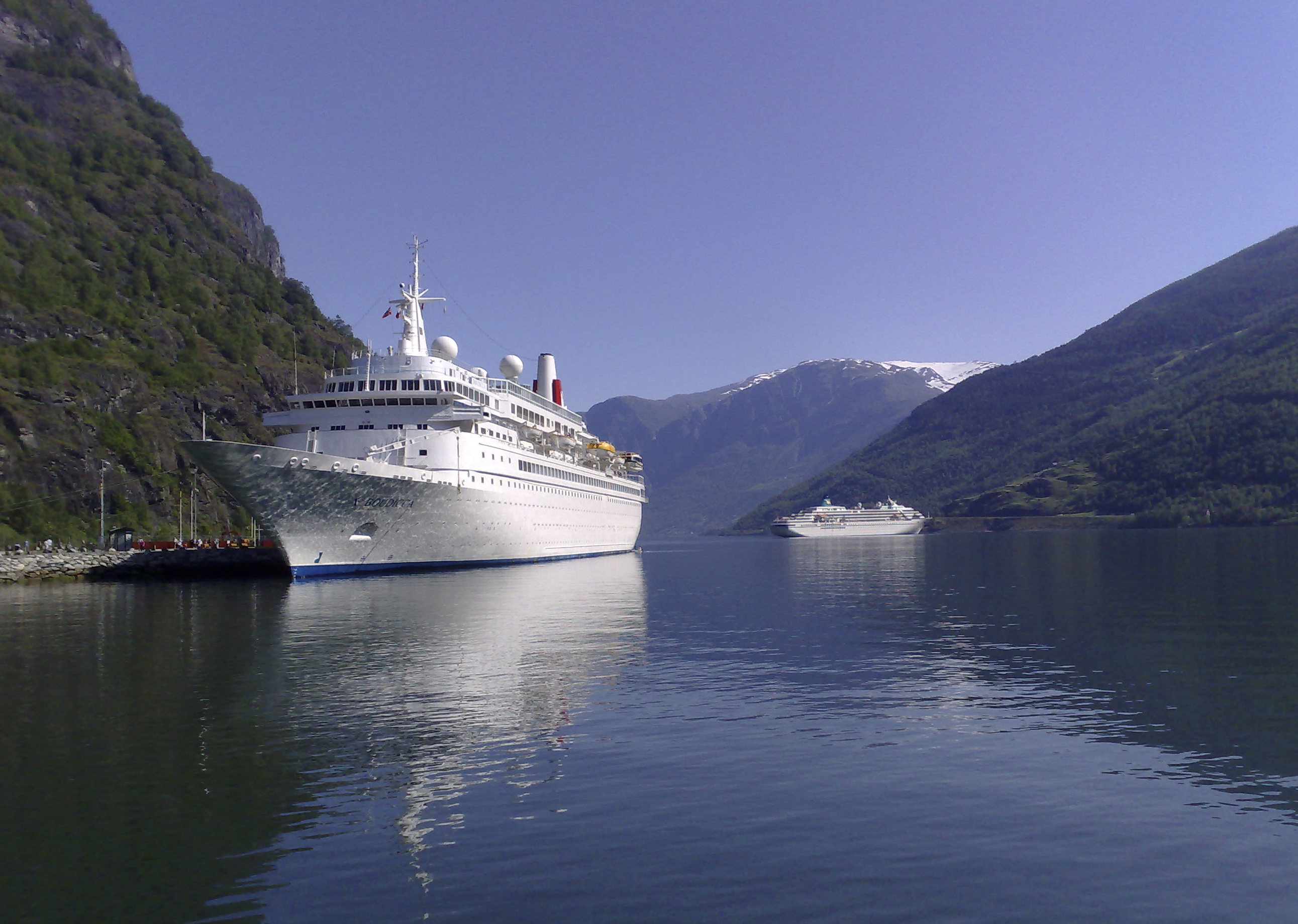
Cruise ship at Flåm

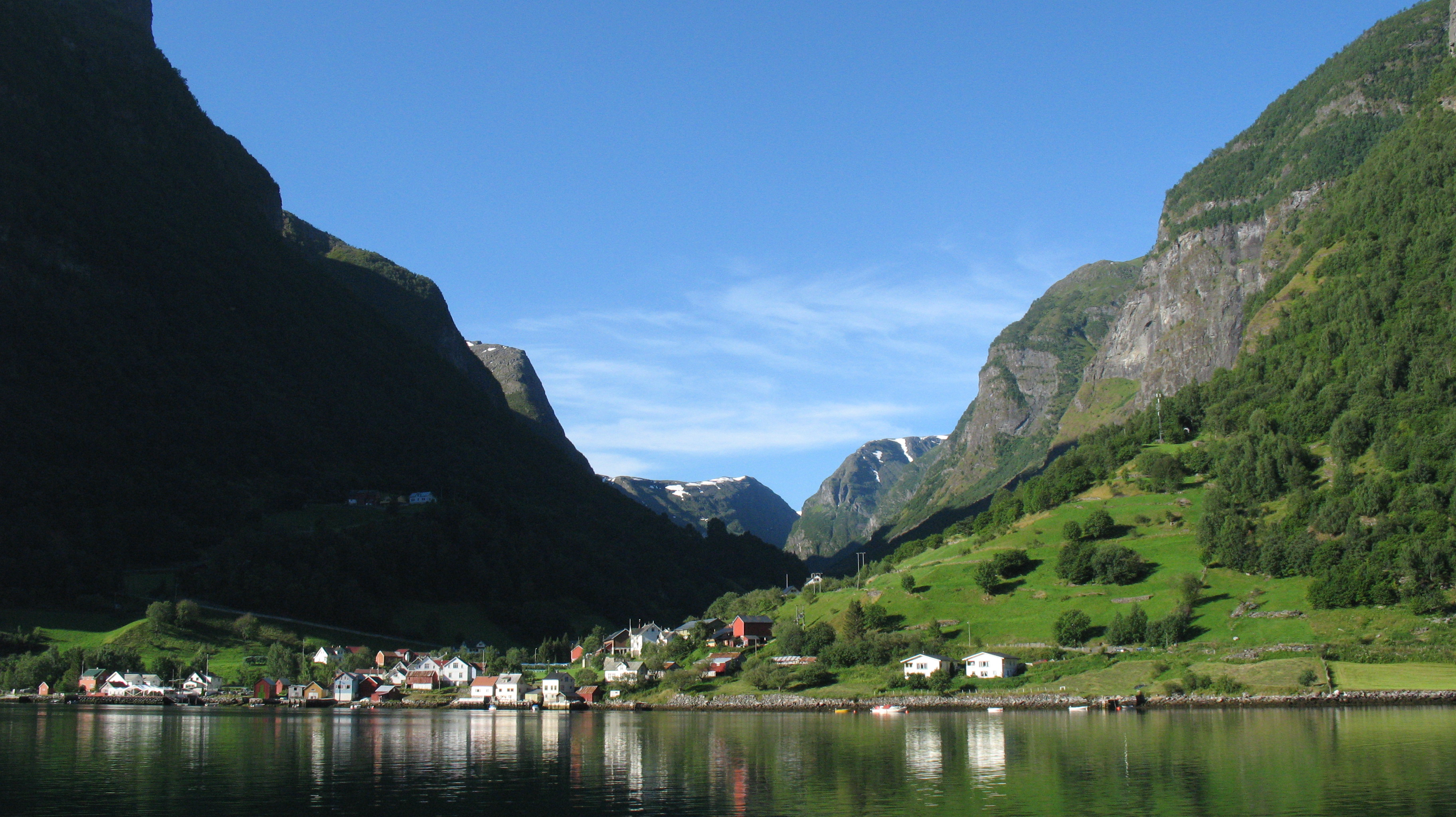
Undredal seen from boat
