= Aurlandsfjellet =

Mountain in Vestland, Norway

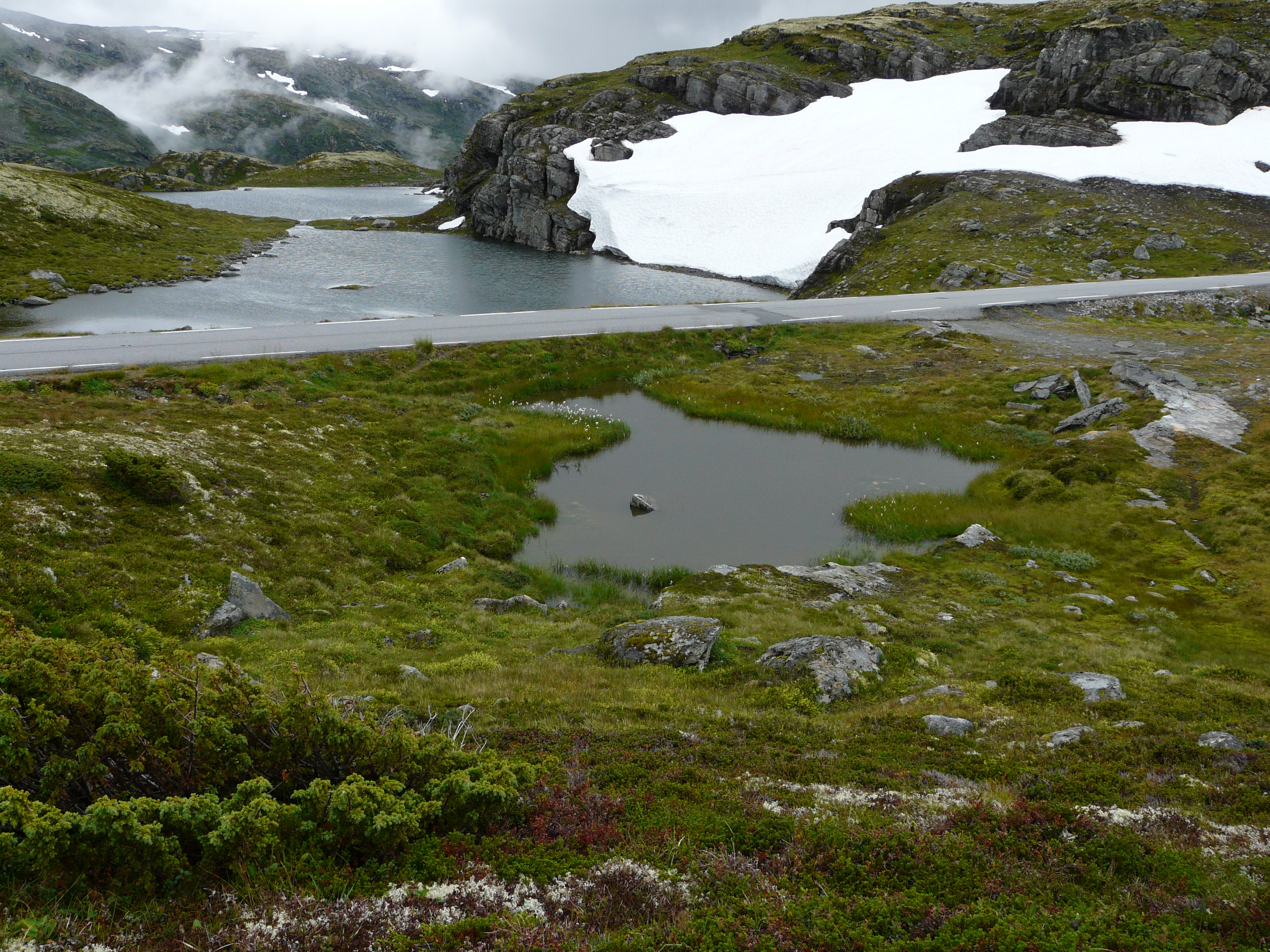
- View of the plateau

Geography
- Location: Vestland, Norway
- Range coordinates: 61.05°N 7.34°E

Aurlandsfjellet (Urban East Norwegian: [ˈæ̂ʉrlɑnsˌfjɛlːə]) is a mountainous area and plateau along the border between Aurland Municipality and Lærdal Municipality in Vestland county, Norway. Norwegian County Road 5627 runs across the mountains, while the Lærdal Tunnel runs through it.

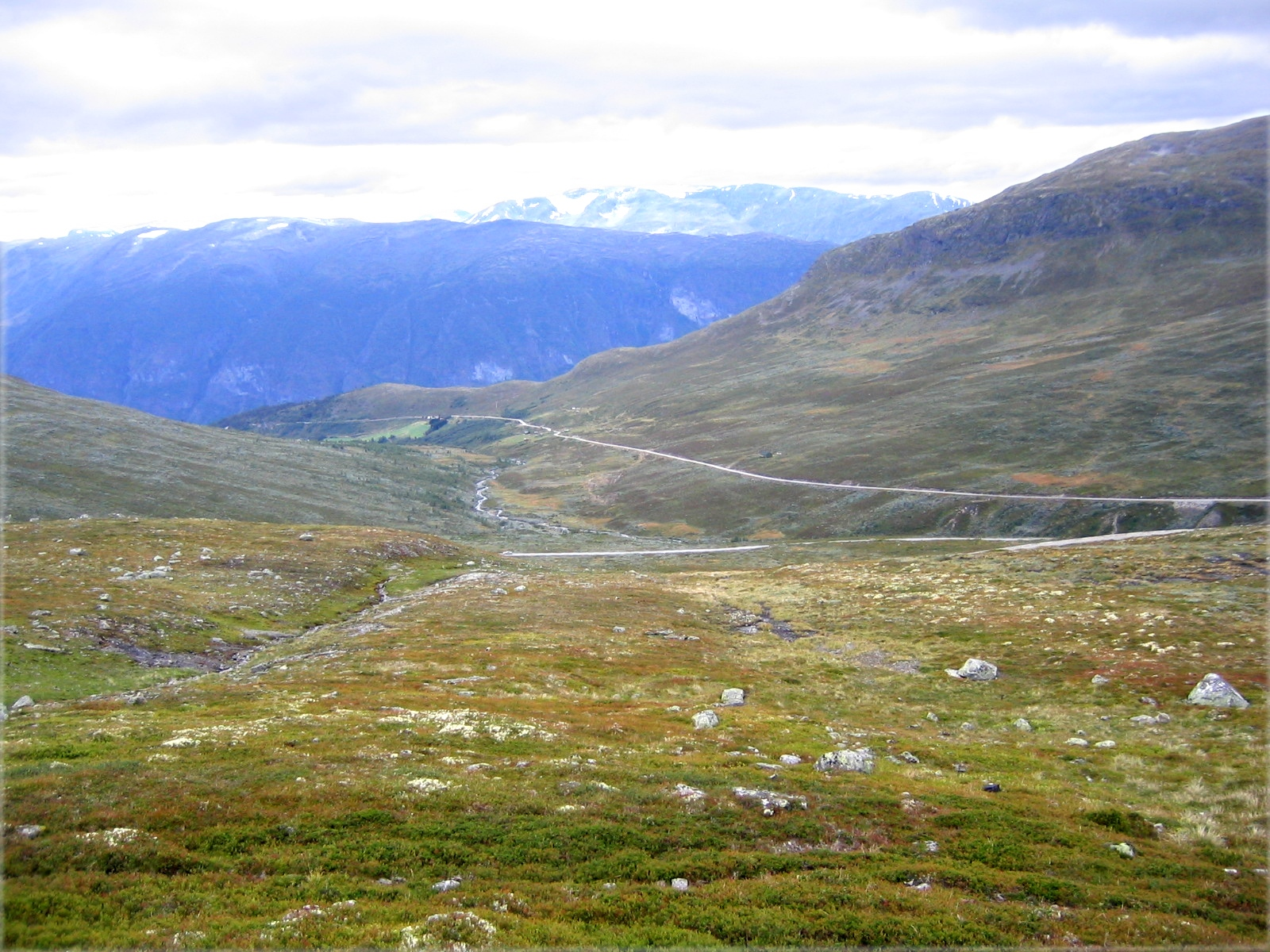
The road running along the mountain
