= Aurlandsvangen =

Village in Aurland Municipality, Norway

- Village
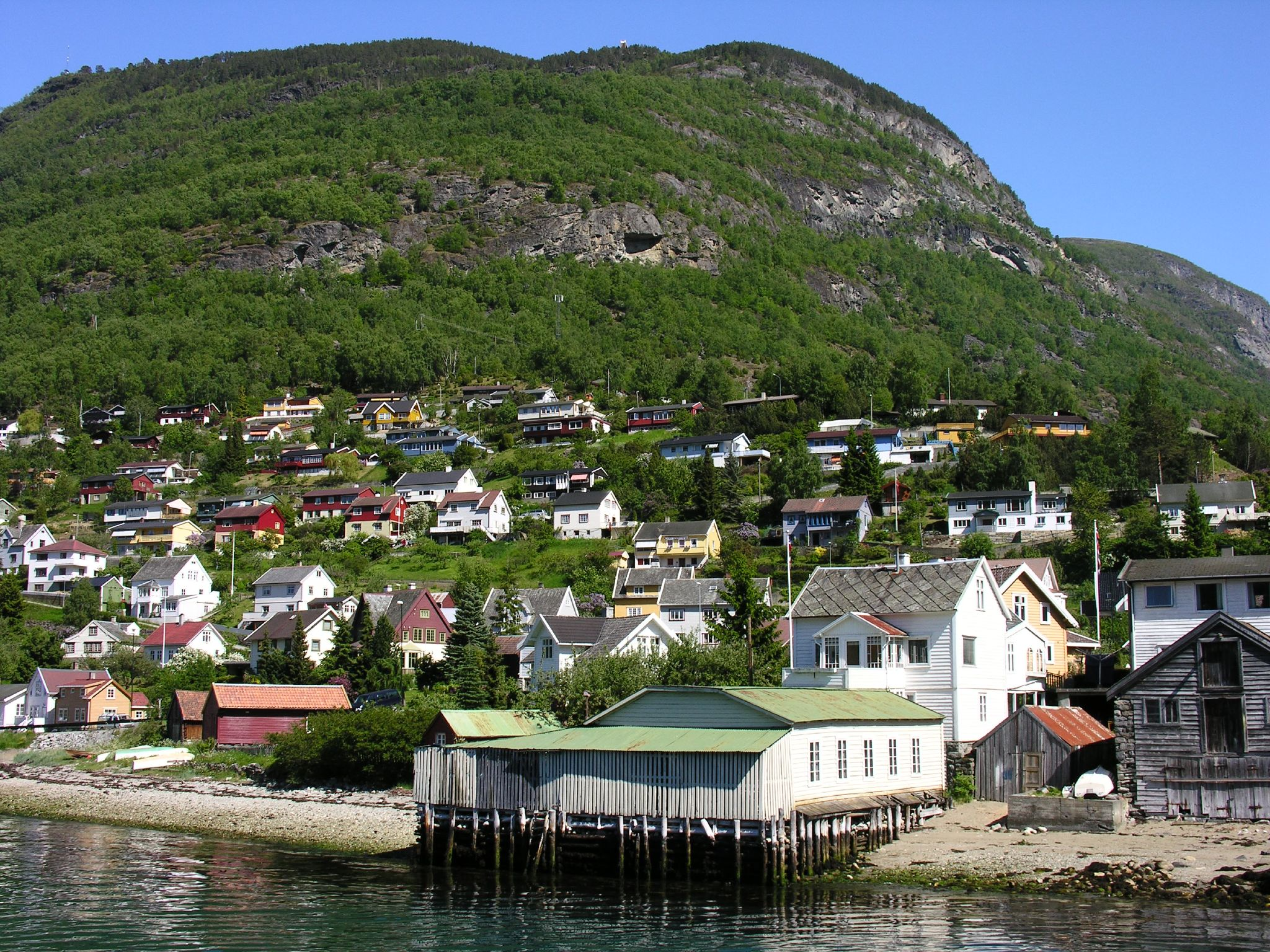
- View of Aurlandsvangen
- Interactive map of Aurlandsvangen
- Location within Vestland Location within Norway
- Coordinates: 60.9058°N 7.1870°E
- Country: Norway
- Region: Western Norway
- County: Vestland
- District: Sogn
- Municipality: Aurland Municipality

Area
  - Total: 0.62 km^{2} (0.24 sq mi)
- Elevation: 6 m (20 ft)

Population (2025)
  - Total: 824
  - Density: 1,329/km^{2} (3,440/sq mi)
- Time zone: UTC+01:00 (CET)
  - Summer (DST): UTC+02:00 (CEST)
- Post Code: 5745 Aurland

Aurlandsvangen (Urban East Norwegian: [ˈæ̂ʉrlɑnsˌvɑŋːn̩]) is the administrative center of Aurland Municipality in Vestland county, Norway. The village is located on the east side of the Aurlandsfjorden (a branch of the main Sognefjorden) where the Aurlandselvi river flows into the fjord. The village of Undredal and the famous Nærøyfjord are located just a few kilometres to the northwest. Aurlandsvangen is located on the European route E16 highway about 10 kilometres (6.2 mi) northeast of the village of Flåm and 32 kilometres (20 mi) southwest of the village of Lærdalsøyri (through the Lærdal Tunnel).

The 0.62-square-kilometre (150-acre) village has a population (2025) of 824 and a population density of 1,329 inhabitants per square kilometre (3,440/sq mi).

The Lærdal Tunnel has its western end on the south side of Aurlandsvangen, and it heads east through the Aurlandsfjellet mountains before reaching the eastern end of the tunnel near Tønjum in Lærdal Municipality. The tunnel replaces the old Norwegian County Road 5627 which goes over the mountains between Aurland and Lærdal.

The Vangen Church (built 1202) is located in Aurlandsvangen. The lake Fretheimsdalsvatnet is located about 10 kilometres (6.2 mi) southeast of the village of Aurlandsvangen. Aurland Stadion is also located in the village.

== Media gallery ==
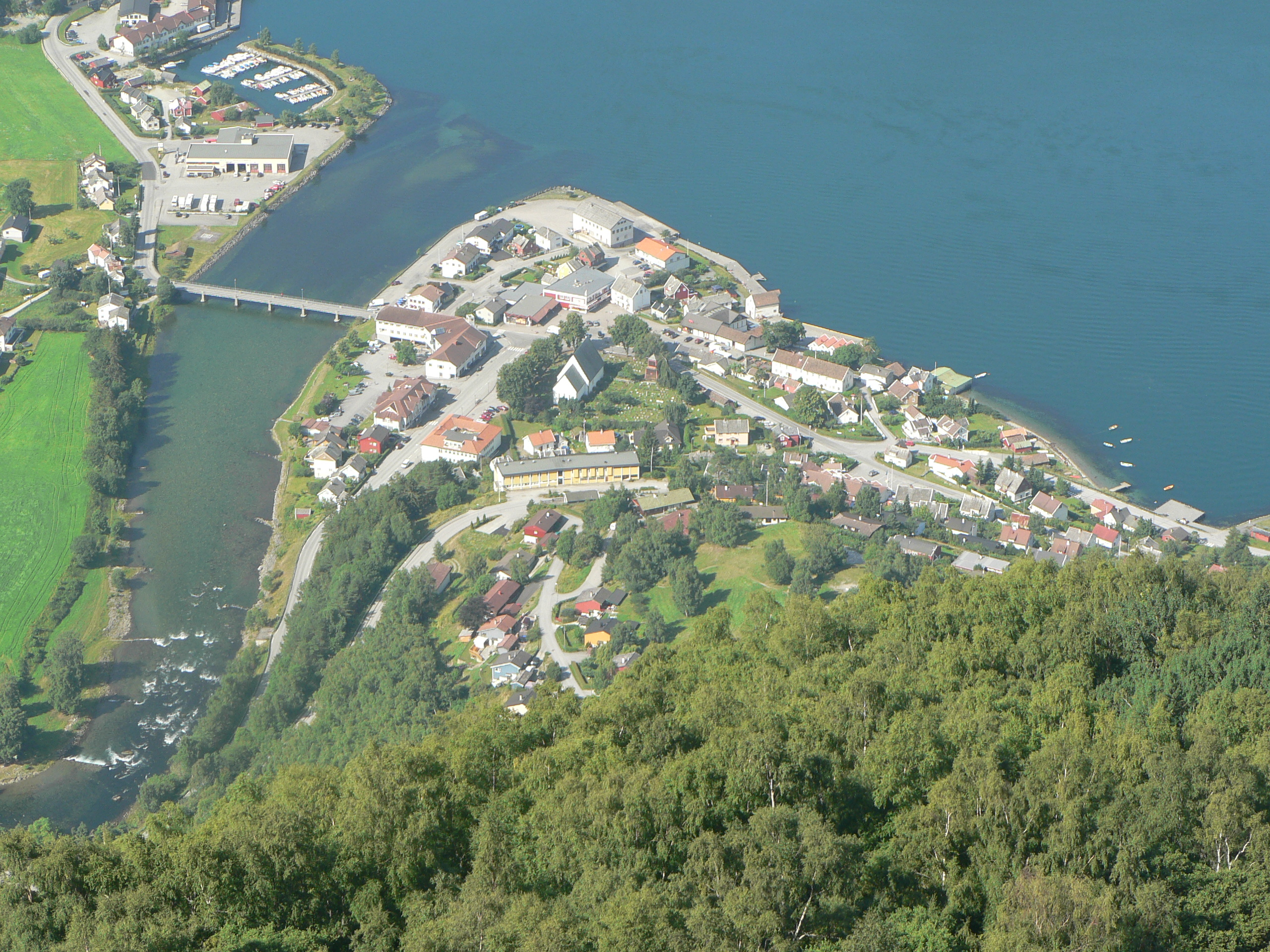
Aerial view

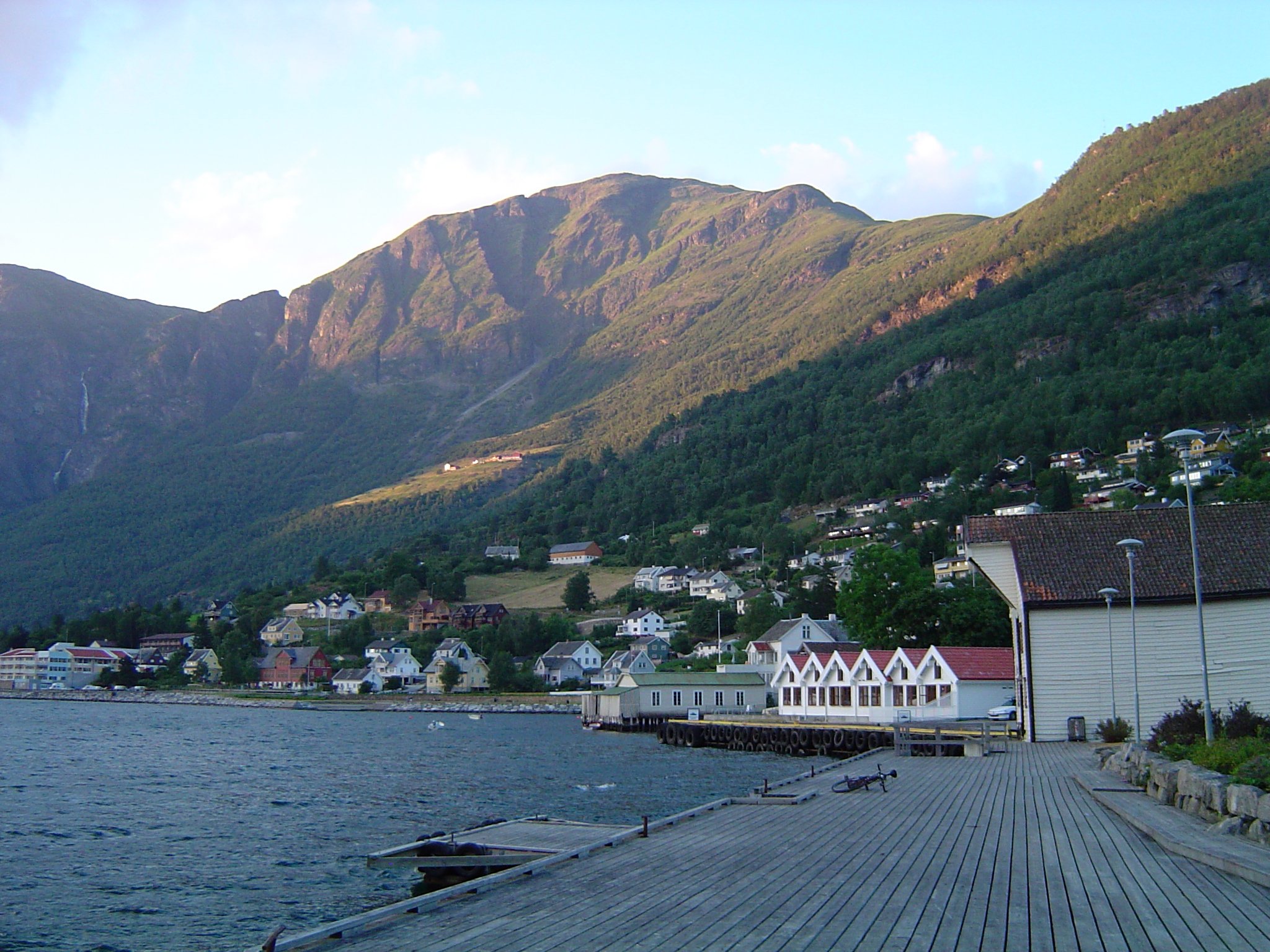
Aurlandsvangen

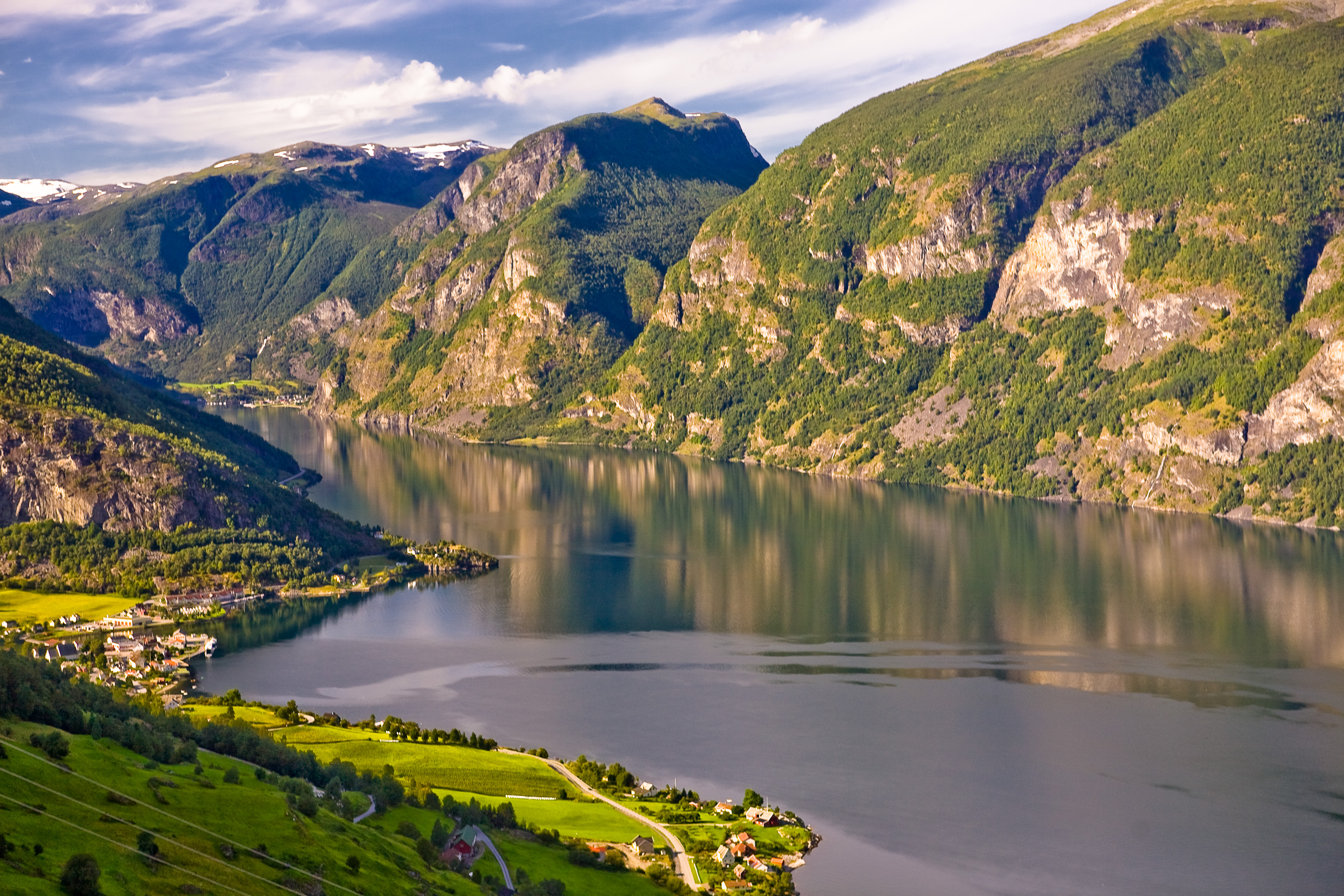
View from Snøvegan

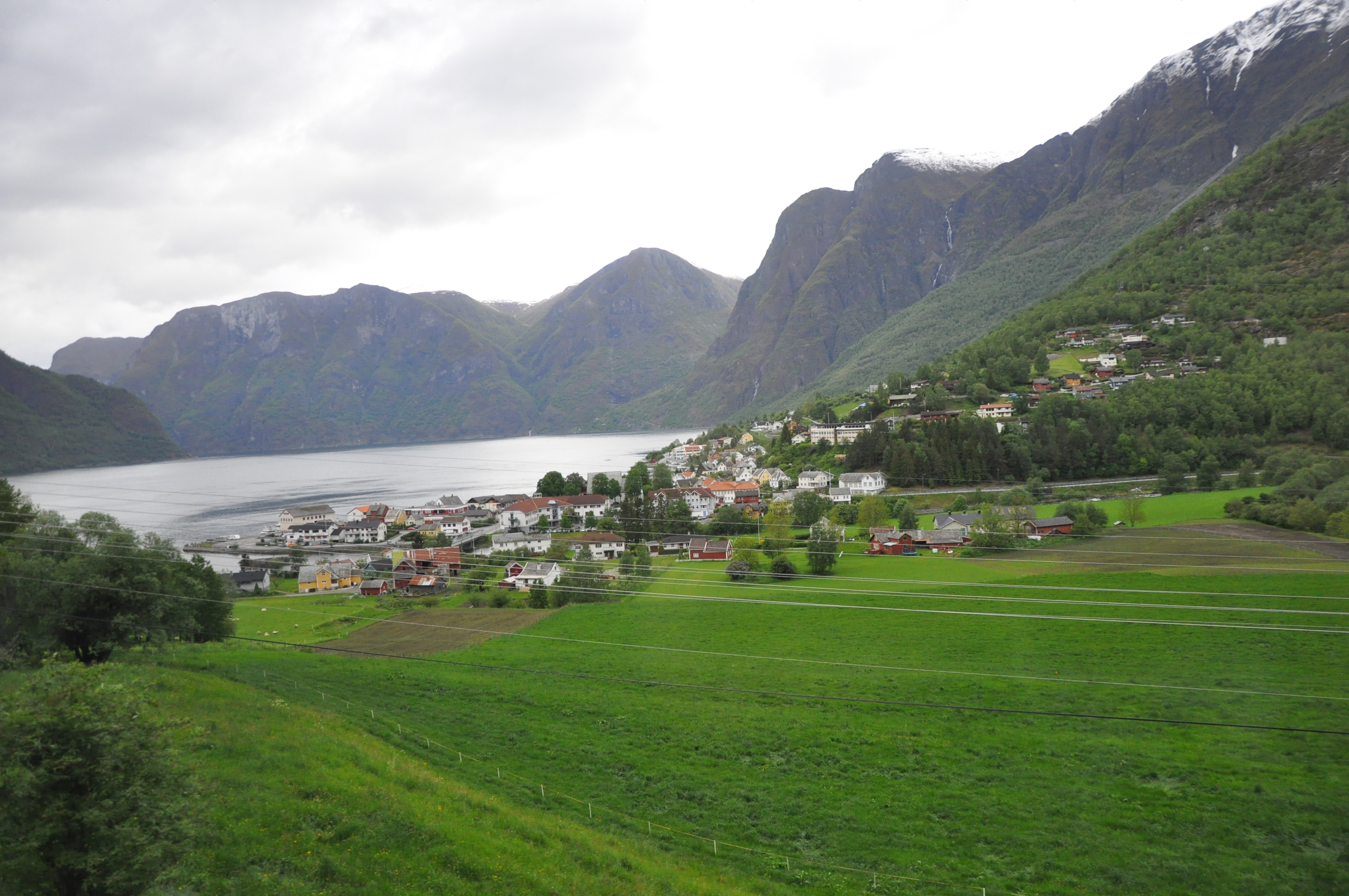
View from E16 highway
