= Fræna Municipality =

Former municipality in Møre og Romsdal, Norway

Fræna Municipality Fræna kommune
- Former municipality
- Frænen herred (historic name); Vaagø herred (historic name)
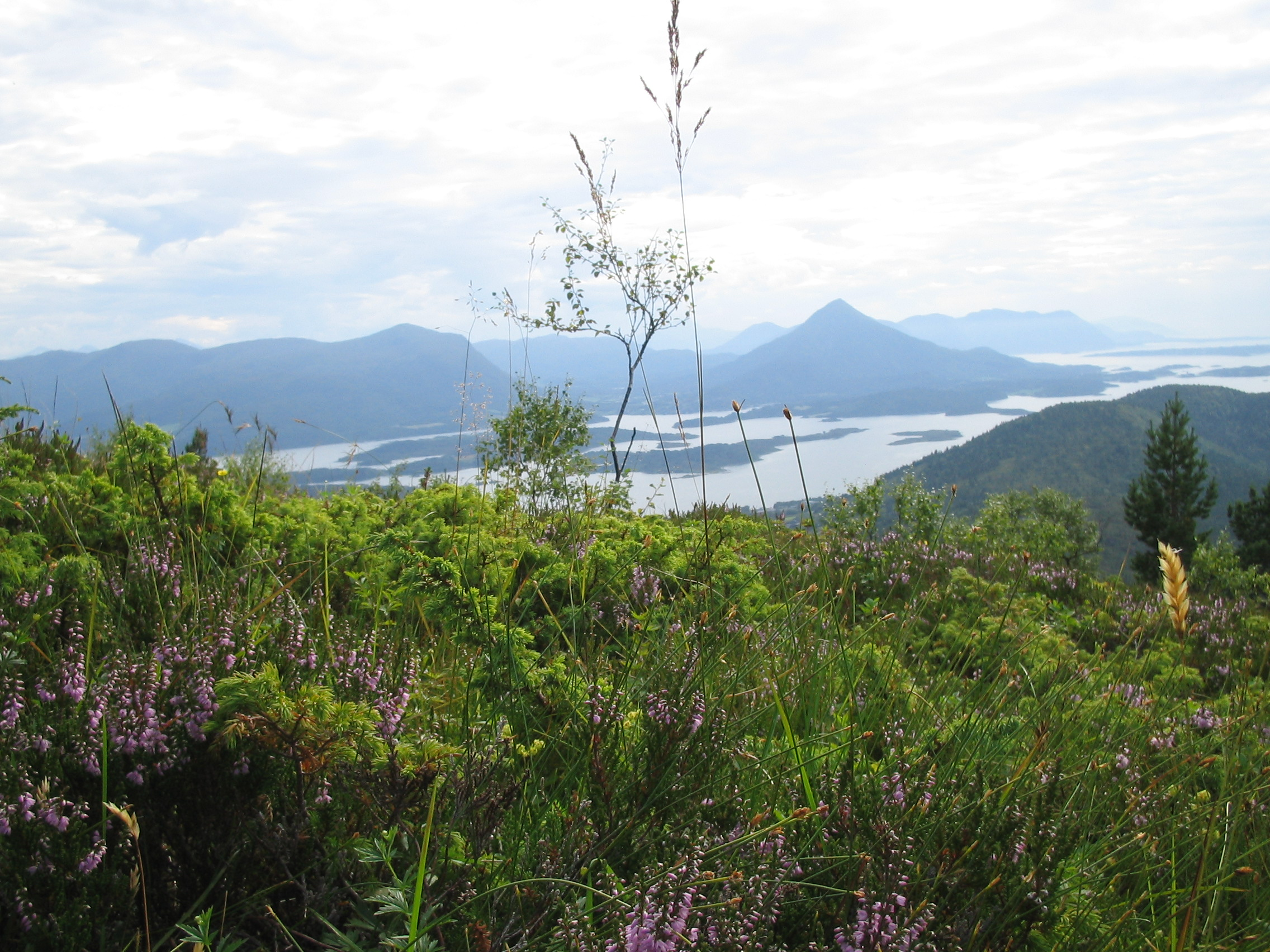
- View from Lågheia near Elnesvågen

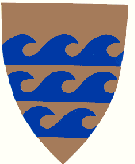
- Flag Coat of arms

- Møre og Romsdal within Norway

- Fræna within Møre og Romsdal
- Coordinates: 62°54′28″N 07°06′30″E
- Country: Norway
- County: Møre og Romsdal
- District: Romsdal
- Established: 1840
  - Preceded by: Akerø Municipality
- Disestablished: 1 Jan 2020
  - Succeeded by: Hustadvika Municipality
- Administrative centre: Elnesvågen

Government
  - Mayor (2015-2019): Tove Henøen (Sp)

Area (upon dissolution)
  - Total: 369.80 km^{2} (142.78 sq mi)
  - Land: 361.99 km^{2} (139.77 sq mi)
  - Water: 7.81 km^{2} (3.02 sq mi) 2.1%
  - Rank: #250 in Norway
- Highest elevation: 981.4 m (3,220 ft)

Population (2024)
  - Total: 9,800
  - Rank: #115 in Norway
  - Density: 26.5/km^{2} (69/sq mi)
  - Change (10 years): ▲ +5.9%
- Demonym: Frening

Official language
  - Norwegian form: Nynorsk
- Time zone: UTC+01:00 (CET)
  - Summer (DST): UTC+02:00 (CEST)
- ISO 3166 code: NO-1548

Fræna is a former municipality in Møre og Romsdal county, Norway. The 370-square-kilometre (140 sq mi) municipality existed from 1840 until its dissolution in 2020. The area is now part of Hustadvika Municipality in the traditional district of Romsdal. The municipality was located on the Romsdal peninsula surrounding the Frænfjorden, the eastern shore of the Julsundet strait, and it included most of the Hustadvika area. It also included the now-abandoned Bjørnsund islands.

The main village and administrative centre in Fræna was Elnesvågen. Other villages in Fræna included Hustad, Bud, Tornes, Sylte, Malme, and Aureosen. Moxy Engineering, Hustad Marmor, and Tine Meierier are all factories located in Elnesvågen.

Prior to its dissolution in 2020, the 370-square-kilometre (140 sq mi) municipality was the 250th largest by area out of the 422 municipalities in Norway. Fræna Municipality was the 115th most populous municipality in Norway with a population of about 9,800. The municipality's population density was 26.5 inhabitants per square kilometre (69/sq mi) and its population had increased by 5.9% over the previous 10-year period.

== General information ==
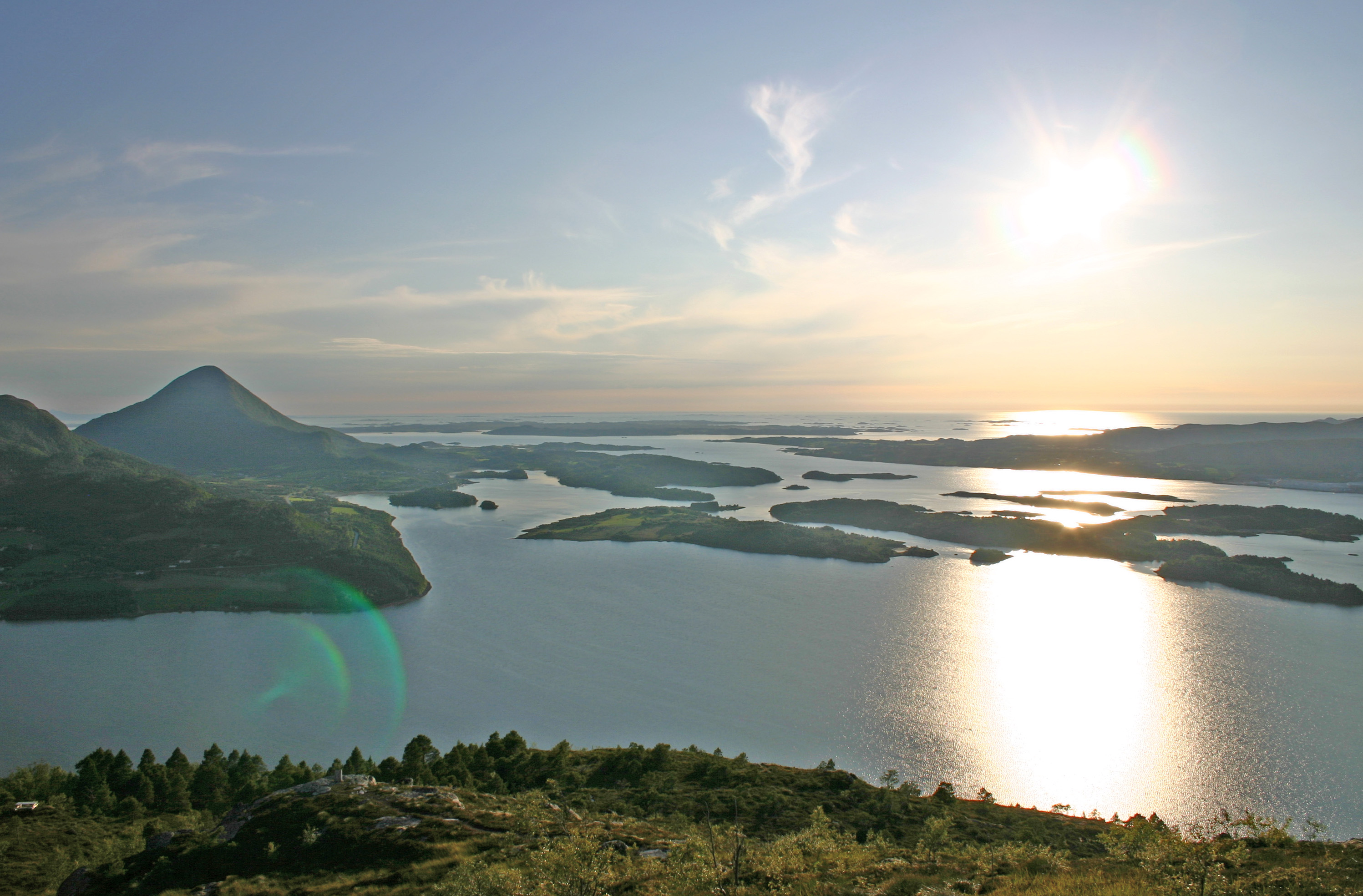
View of the Frænfjorden

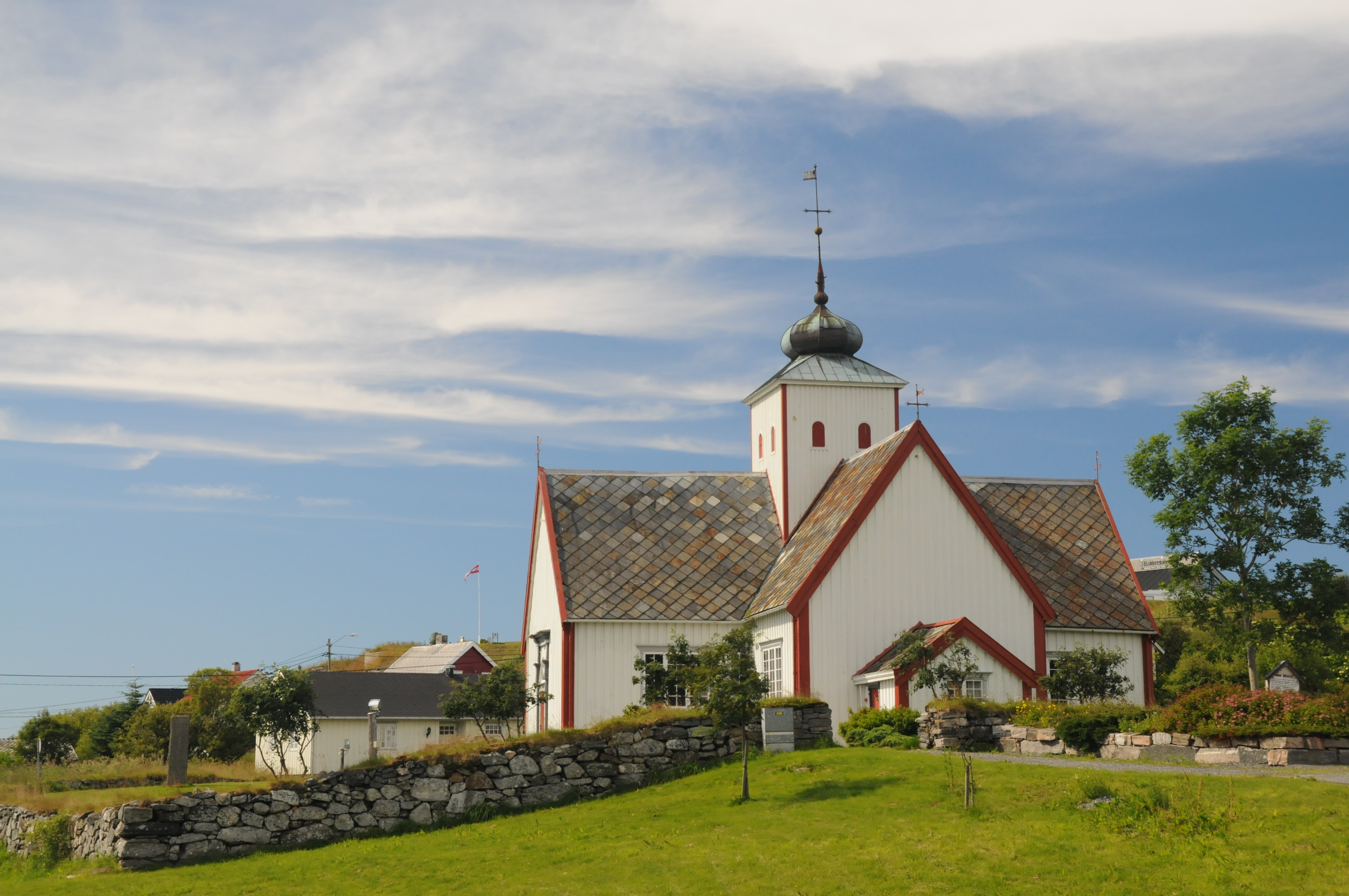
View of Bud Church

The municipality of Fræna was established in 1840 when it was separated from Akerø Municipality. Originally, it was named Vaagø Municipality and it surrounded the Frænfjorden. Later the name was changed to Fræna Municipality.

During the 1960s, there were many municipal mergers across Norway due to the work of the Schei Committee. On 1 January 1964, Bud Municipality (population: 1,610), Hustad Municipality (population: 2,196), and Fræna Municipality (population: 3,430) were merged to form a new, larger Fræna Municipality.

On 1 January 2020, Eide Municipality and Fræna Municipality were merged to form the new Hustadvika Municipality.

=== Name ===
The municipality (originally the parish) was first named Vaagø, after the old Vaagøen farm (Old Norse: Vágøy) since the first Vågøy Church was built there. The first element is vágr which means "bay" or "sea". The last element is øy which means "island". The municipality had this name from 1840 until 1865. In 1865, the municipal name was changed to Frænen, after the Frænfjorden (Old Norse: Fræni). The meaning of the fjord name is unknown, but it may have been derived from the word frænn which means "bright" or "shiny". Another option was that it comes from the word frenje which means "foam" or "howl", referring to the local fjord in high winds. On 3 November 1917, a royal resolution changed the spelling of the name of the municipality from Frænen to Fræna.

=== Coat of arms ===
The coat of arms was granted on 15 May 1995 and it was in use until 2020 when the municipality ceased to exist. The official blazon is "Or, three bars wavy azure crested to the dexter on the upper edge" (Norwegian: På gull botn tre blå bjelkar der overkantane er teikna med kvervelsnitt). This means the arms have a field (background) has a tincture of Or which means it is commonly colored yellow, but if it is made out of metal, then gold is used. The charge is three horizontal bars designed too look like ocean surface waves. The arms were chosen to symbolize the municipality's connection to the sea. There are three bars to represent the three former municipalities which were merged to form Fræna Municipality in 1964: Fræna, Bud, and Hustad. The arms were designed by Jarle Skuseth. The municipal flag has the same design as the coat of arms.

=== Churches ===
The Church of Norway had four parishes (sokn) within Fræna Municipality. It is part of the Molde domprosti (arch-deanery) in the Diocese of Møre.

Churches in Fræna Municipality
Parish (sokn)	Church name	Location of the church	Year built
Bud	Bud Church	Bud	1717
Hustad	Hustad Church	Hustad	1874
Myrbostad	Myrbostad Church	Elnesvågen	1880
Vågøy	Vågøy Church	Vågøya	1904

== Geography ==
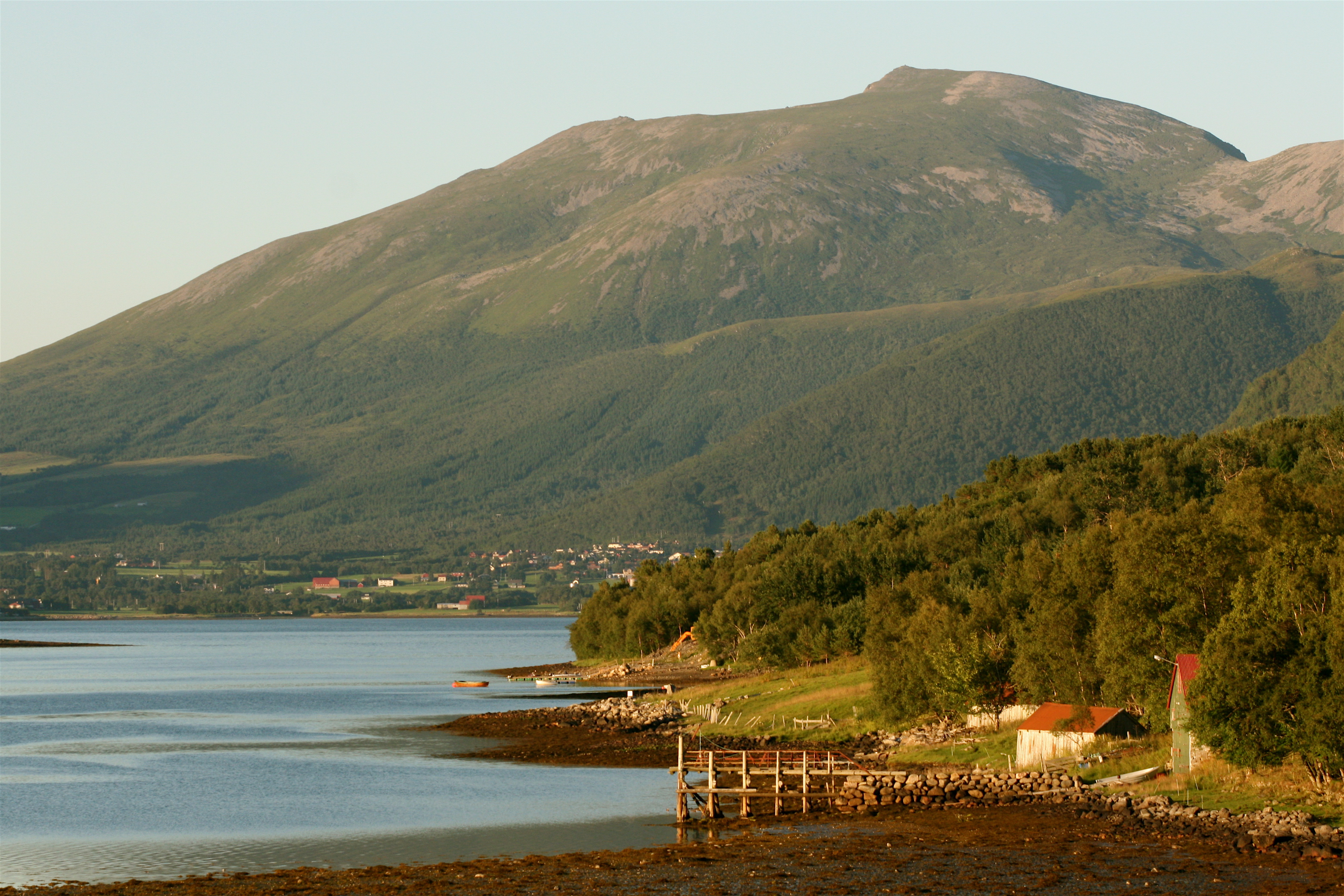
View of the village of Aureosen

The municipality of Fræna was located on the northwestern end of the Romsdal Peninsula. The Norwegian Sea was to the north; the Harøyfjorden, Julsundet strait, and Aukra Municipality were to the west; Molde Municipality was to the south; and Gjemnes Municipality and Eide Municipality were to the east.

The Frænfjorden cut into the middle of the municipality. The coastal areas were low and marshy while the interior of the municipality was mountainous. The highest point in the municipality was the 981.4-metre (3,220 ft) tall mountain Kvannfjellet. Other notable mountains in Fræna were Jendemsfjellet, Høgheitinden, and Lågheiane. The Bjørnsund islands were located off the northwestern coast of Fræna. They are now uninhabited, but the Bjørnsund Lighthouse is still in operation.

== Government ==
While it existed, Fræna Municipality was responsible for primary education (through 10th grade), outpatient health services, senior citizen services, welfare and other social services, zoning, economic development, and municipal roads and utilities. The municipality was governed by a municipal council of directly elected representatives. The mayor was indirectly elected by a vote of the municipal council. The municipality was under the jurisdiction of the Frostating Court of Appeal.

=== Municipal council ===
The municipal council (Kommunestyre) of Fræna Municipality was made up of 31 representatives that were elected to four year terms. The tables below show the historical composition of the council by political party.

Fræna kommunestyre 2015–2019
Party name (in Nynorsk)	Number of representatives
Labour Party (Arbeidarpartiet)	6
Progress Party (Framstegspartiet)	3
Conservative Party (Høgre)	6
Christian Democratic Party (Kristeleg Folkeparti)	3
Centre Party (Senterpartiet)	11
Socialist Left Party (Sosialistisk Venstreparti)	1
Liberal Party (Venstre)	1
Total number of members:	31

Fræna kommunestyre 2011–2015
Party name (in Nynorsk)	Number of representatives
Labour Party (Arbeidarpartiet)	6
Progress Party (Framstegspartiet)	5
Conservative Party (Høgre)	8
Christian Democratic Party (Kristeleg Folkeparti)	3
Centre Party (Senterpartiet)	7
Liberal Party (Venstre)	2
Total number of members:	31

Fræna kommunestyre 2007–2011
Party name (in Nynorsk)	Number of representatives
Labour Party (Arbeidarpartiet)	6
Progress Party (Framstegspartiet)	8
Conservative Party (Høgre)	5
Christian Democratic Party (Kristeleg Folkeparti)	3
Centre Party (Senterpartiet)	6
Socialist Left Party (Sosialistisk Venstreparti)	1
Liberal Party (Venstre)	2
Total number of members:	31

Fræna kommunestyre 2003–2007
Party name (in Nynorsk)	Number of representatives
Labour Party (Arbeidarpartiet)	6
Progress Party (Framstegspartiet)	8
Conservative Party (Høgre)	5
Christian Democratic Party (Kristeleg Folkeparti)	3
Centre Party (Senterpartiet)	6
Socialist Left Party (Sosialistisk Venstreparti)	2
Liberal Party (Venstre)	1
Total number of members:	31

Fræna kommunestyre 1999–2003
Party name (in Nynorsk)	Number of representatives
Labour Party (Arbeidarpartiet)	6
Progress Party (Framstegspartiet)	6
Conservative Party (Høgre)	6
Christian Democratic Party (Kristeleg Folkeparti)	7
Centre Party (Senterpartiet)	9
Socialist Left Party (Sosialistisk Venstreparti)	1
Liberal Party (Venstre)	2
Total number of members:	37

Fræna kommunestyre 1995–1999
Party name (in Nynorsk)	Number of representatives
Labour Party (Arbeidarpartiet)	8
Progress Party (Framstegspartiet)	3
Conservative Party (Høgre)	3
Christian Democratic Party (Kristeleg Folkeparti)	6
Pensioners' Party (Pensjonistpartiet)	2
Centre Party (Senterpartiet)	13
Socialist Left Party (Sosialistisk Venstreparti)	1
Liberal Party (Venstre)	1
Total number of members:	37

Fræna kommunestyre 1991–1995
Party name (in Nynorsk)	Number of representatives
Labour Party (Arbeidarpartiet)	8
Progress Party (Framstegspartiet)	3
Conservative Party (Høgre)	4
Christian Democratic Party (Kristeleg Folkeparti)	6
Pensioners' Party (Pensjonistpartiet)	2
Centre Party (Senterpartiet)	11
Socialist Left Party (Sosialistisk Venstreparti)	2
Liberal Party (Venstre)	1
Total number of members:	37

Fræna kommunestyre 1987–1991
Party name (in Nynorsk)	Number of representatives
Labour Party (Arbeidarpartiet)	11
Progress Party (Framstegspartiet)	5
Conservative Party (Høgre)	5
Christian Democratic Party (Kristeleg Folkeparti)	6
Centre Party (Senterpartiet)	7
Socialist Left Party (Sosialistisk Venstreparti)	1
Liberal Party (Venstre)	2
Total number of members:	37

Fræna kommunestyre 1983–1987
Party name (in Nynorsk)	Number of representatives
Labour Party (Arbeidarpartiet)	11
Progress Party (Framstegspartiet)	2
Conservative Party (Høgre)	5
Christian Democratic Party (Kristeleg Folkeparti)	7
Centre Party (Senterpartiet)	7
Socialist Left Party (Sosialistisk Venstreparti)	1
Liberal Party (Venstre)	2
Non-party list (Upolitisk liste)	2
Total number of members:	37

Fræna kommunestyre 1979–1983
Party name (in Nynorsk)	Number of representatives
Labour Party (Arbeidarpartiet)	10
Conservative Party (Høgre)	6
Christian Democratic Party (Kristeleg Folkeparti)	7
Centre Party (Senterpartiet)	8
Socialist Left Party (Sosialistisk Venstreparti)	1
Liberal Party (Venstre)	2
Cross-party common list (Tverrpolitisk Samlingsliste)	3
Total number of members:	37

Fræna kommunestyre 1975–1979
Party name (in Nynorsk)	Number of representatives
Labour Party (Arbeidarpartiet)	10
Conservative Party (Høgre)	2
Christian Democratic Party (Kristeleg Folkeparti)	8
New People's Party (Nye Folkepartiet)	1
Centre Party (Senterpartiet)	13
Liberal Party (Venstre)	3
Total number of members:	37

Fræna kommunestyre 1971–1975
Party name (in Nynorsk)	Number of representatives
Labour Party (Arbeidarpartiet)	12
Conservative Party (Høgre)	2
Christian Democratic Party (Kristeleg Folkeparti)	8
Centre Party (Senterpartiet)	11
Liberal Party (Venstre)	4
Total number of members:	37

Fræna kommunestyre 1967–1971
Party name (in Nynorsk)	Number of representatives
Labour Party (Arbeidarpartiet)	10
Conservative Party (Høgre)	2
Christian Democratic Party (Kristeleg Folkeparti)	9
Centre Party (Senterpartiet)	10
Liberal Party (Venstre)	6
Total number of members:	37

Fræna kommunestyre 1963–1967
Party name (in Nynorsk)	Number of representatives
Labour Party (Arbeidarpartiet)	9
Christian Democratic Party (Kristeleg Folkeparti)	9
Centre Party (Senterpartiet)	9
Liberal Party (Venstre)	7
Local List(s) (Lokale lister)	3
Total number of members:	37

Fræna heradsstyre 1959–1963
Party name (in Nynorsk)	Number of representatives
Labour Party (Arbeidarpartiet)	4
Christian Democratic Party (Kristeleg Folkeparti)	4
Centre Party (Senterpartiet)	4
Local List(s) (Lokale lister)	13
Total number of members:	25

Fræna heradsstyre 1955–1959
Party name (in Nynorsk)	Number of representatives
Labour Party (Arbeidarpartiet)	4
Local List(s) (Lokale lister)	21
Total number of members:	25

Fræna heradsstyre 1951–1955
Party name (in Nynorsk)	Number of representatives
Labour Party (Arbeidarpartiet)	3
Joint List(s) of Non-Socialist Parties (Borgarlege Felleslister)	7
Local List(s) (Lokale lister)	14
Total number of members:	24

Fræna heradsstyre 1947–1951
Party name (in Nynorsk)	Number of representatives
Labour Party (Arbeidarpartiet)	2
Local List(s) (Lokale lister)	22
Total number of members:	24

Fræna heradsstyre 1945–1947
Party name (in Nynorsk)	Number of representatives
Labour Party (Arbeidarpartiet)	3
List of workers, fishermen, and small farmholders (Arbeidarar, fiskarar, småbrukarar liste)	4
Local List(s) (Lokale lister)	17
Total number of members:	24

Fræna heradsstyre 1937–1941*
Party name (in Nynorsk)	Number of representatives
Labour Party (Arbeidarpartiet)	5
List of workers, fishermen, and small farmholders (Arbeidarar, fiskarar, småbrukarar liste)	3
Local List(s) (Lokale lister)	16
Total number of members:	24
Note: Due to the German occupation of Norway during World War II, no elections were held for new municipal councils until after the war ended in 1945.

=== Mayors ===
The mayor (Nynorsk: ordførar) of Fræna Municipality was the political leader of the municipality and the chairperson of the municipal council. The following people have held this position:

- 1840–1845: Knut Pedersen Haukaas
- 1846–1851: Christen T. Sommernæs
- 1852–1853: H. Hagerup
- 1854–1861: Christen T. Sommernæs
- 1862–1863: Ole Gjerset
- 1864–1865: K. Dreyer
- 1866–1869: Ole L. Nøsen
- 1870–1875: Arne Stavik
- 1876–1877: Ingebrigt Rødseth
- 1878–1879: Knut O. Julset
- 1879–1881: Ole Julset
- 1882–1883: Ole Sande
- 1884–1889: Ole Brogstad
- 1890–1895: A. Sundsby
- 1896–1910: Peder Jonsen Malmedal
- 1911–1922: Mathias Hoemsnes
- 1923–1928: Knut A. Ødegaard
- 1929–1934: Iver Olsen Kjørsvik
- 1934–1936: Hans Haukås (NS)
- 1937–1940: Iver Olsen Kjørsvik
- 1945–1945: Iver Olsen Kjørsvik
- 1945–1946: Ole Valle
- 1947–1963: Harald J. Stavik (Ap)
- 1963–1975: Sverre Moen (KrF)
- 1975–1979: Hans Kvadsheim (Sp)
- 1979–1987: Knut Nilsen Sæbø (KrF)
- 1987–1999: Lindy Eidem (Sp)
- 1999–2003: Ragnar Valle (Sp)
- 2003–2007: Arve Hans Otterlei (FrP)
- 2007–2011: Kjell Lode (KrF)
- 2011–2015: Nils Johan Gjendem (FrP)
- 2015–2019: Tove Henøen (Sp)

== See also ==
- List of former municipalities of Norway
