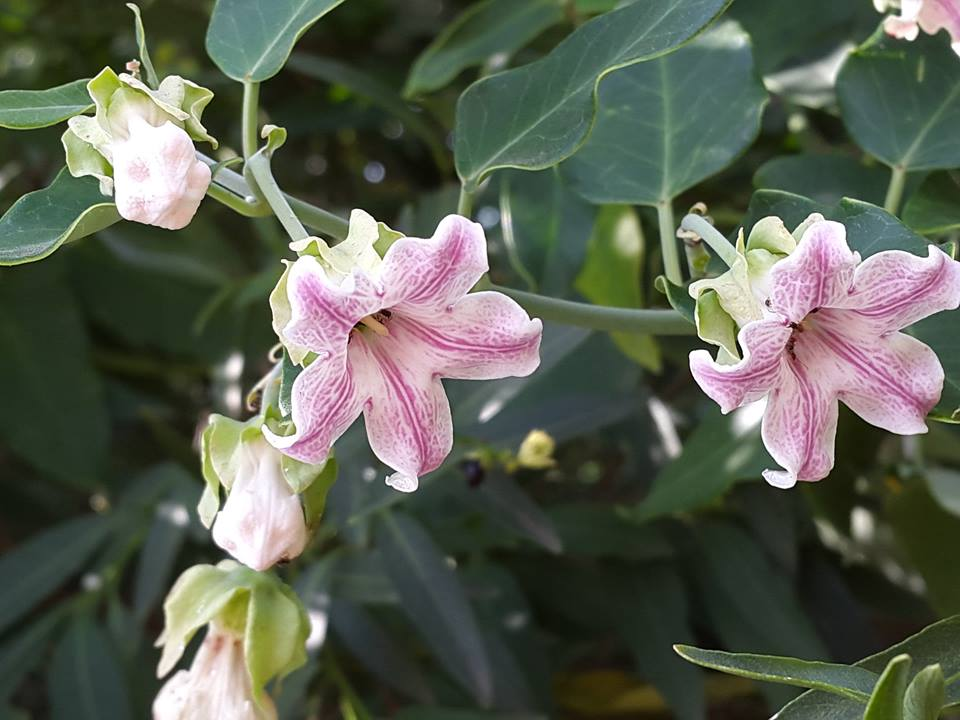

Scientific classification
- Kingdom: Plantae
- Clade: Embryophytes
- Clade: Tracheophytes
- Clade: Spermatophytes
- Clade: Angiosperms
- Clade: Eudicots
- Clade: Asterids
- Order: Gentianales
- Family: Apocynaceae
- Genus: Araujia
- Species: A. sericifera

Binomial name
- Araujia sericifera Brot.

Synonyms
- Araujia albens (Mart.) G.Don 1837.; Araujia calycina Decne. 1844.; Araujia grandiflora (Mart.) Morong Ann. 1893.; Araujia hortorum E.Fourn. 1885.; Araujia sericifera f. calycina (Decne.) Malme 1909.; Araujia sericifera f. hortorum (E.Fourn.) Malme 1909.; Araujia sericifera var. hortorum (E.Fourn.) Malme 1900.; Physianthus albens Mart. 1824.

= Araujia sericifera =

Species of plant

Araujia sericifera is a perennial vining plant in the genus Araujia, of the family Apocynaceae, that is native to South America. The species was described in 1817 by the Portuguese botanist Félix de Avelar Brotero. The synonym Araujia hortorum is in more frequent use in New Zealand. Its common names include bladderflower, white bladderflower, bladder vine, cruel vine, cruel plant, moth plant, moth vine, common moth vine, and false choko.

It was introduced to Europe and other areas as an ornamental plant, but it is now considered a noxious weed. In some countries, such as France, the attractive and abundant fragrant flowering make it a specimen considered worth cultivating. However its strong robustness combined with high seed production can make it invasive in most environments, but not in France due to its sensitivity to frost.

== Etymology ==
The genus name (Araujia) derives from António de Araújo e Azevedo, 1st Count of Barca (1754–1817), a Portuguese amateur botanist who conducted scientific studies and experiments in his own botanical garden. The species' Latin name sericifera means "silk-bearing" and refers to the silky hairs surrounding the seeds inside the fruits. Araujia sericofera is an incorrect taxonomic synonym for Araujia sericifera.

== Description ==
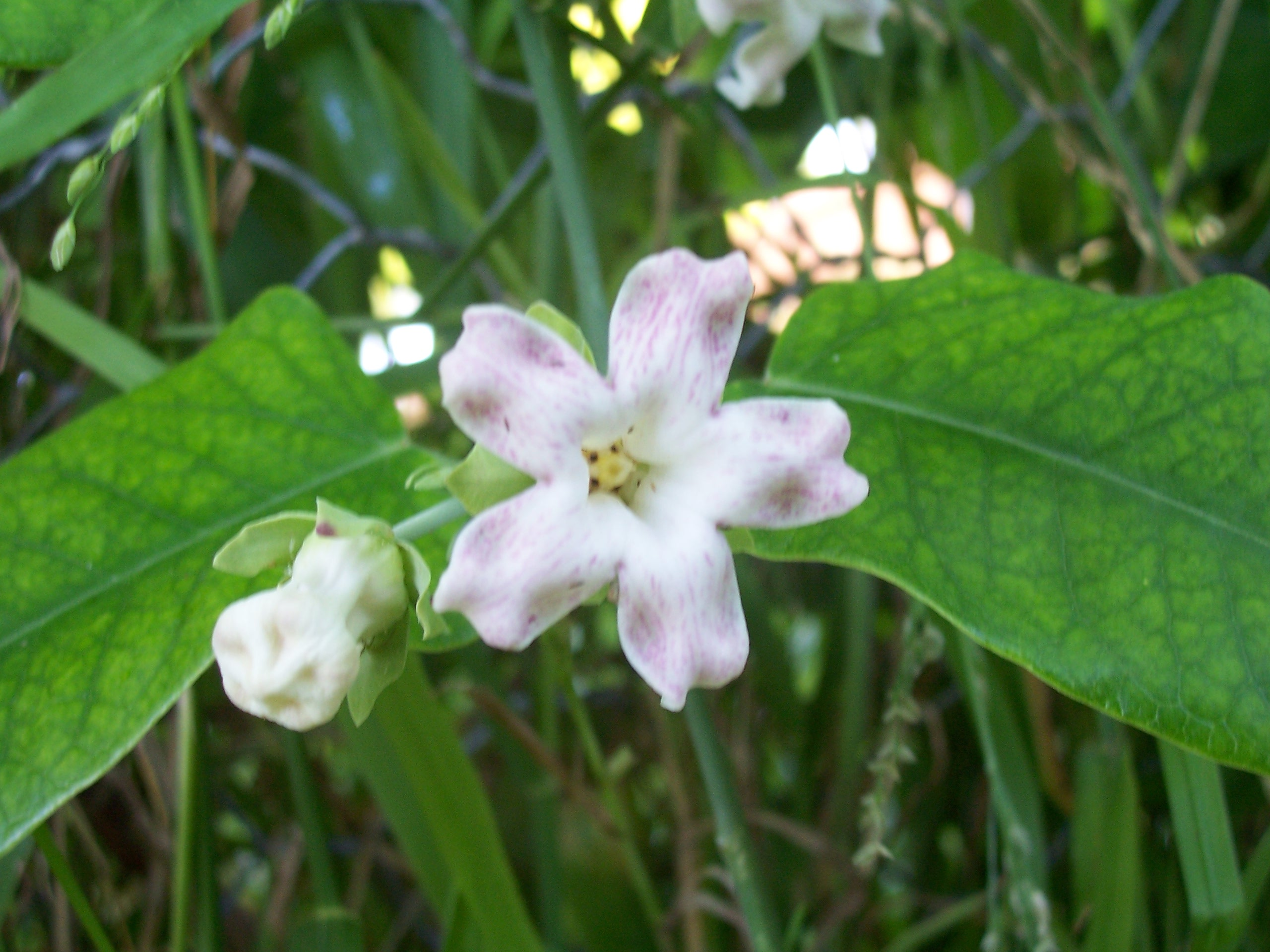
Closeup of flowers

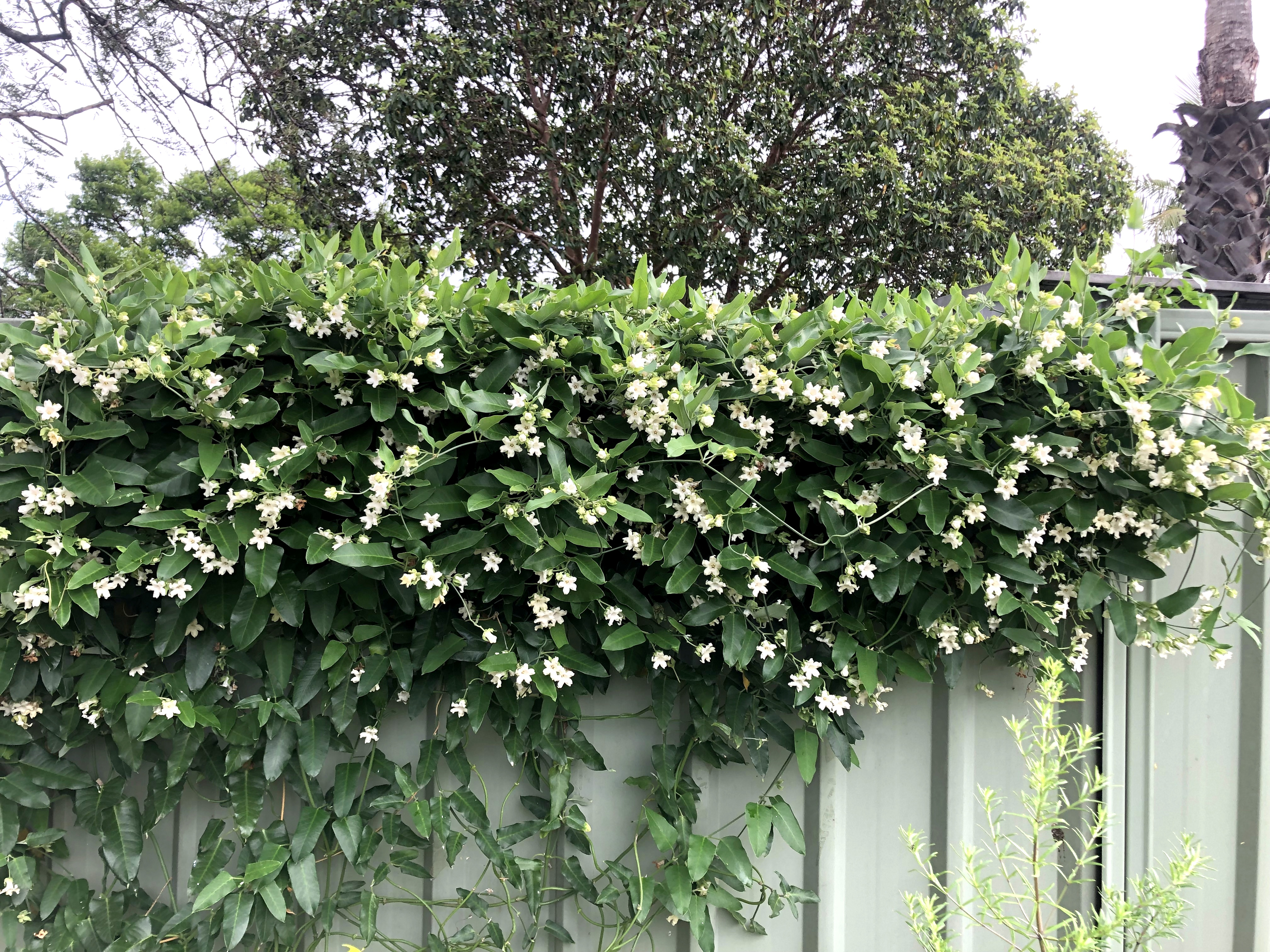
As an ornamental plant

Araujia sericifera is a creeping vine that can climb up to 5–10 metres (16–33 ft) high. When broken it releases a milky, smelly exudate. Leaves are opposite, dark green, glossy and quite fleshy, almost triangular, with entire margins, about 10–12 centimetres (3.9–4.7 in) long and 1–6 centimetres (0.39–2.36 in) wide with an intact leaf margin. The upper side is dark green, bare and shiny, the underside is grey-green with felt-like hairs. When a stem, leaf or unripe fruit is broken, a white milky juice is produced at the breaking point. It is slightly toxic and can cause an allergic skin reaction when touched.

The stems are thin and right-winding. They branch strongly and can lignify at the base. The plant usually wraps itself around other plants or around a post or the bars of a fence. The root system consists of a short taproot with superficial lateral roots. The plant's stems and leaves may senesce in late summer or early autumn, but new shoots will grow on the old stems as climbing support.

=== Inflorescences ===
The twining stems feature scented, cup-shaped bisexual flowers, around 2 centimetres (0.79 in) in width, with five white, cream-coloured, violet or pale pink petals. The flowers are generally pollinated by moths (hence the name "moth plant"), butterflies and bees (entomophily), but they can self-pollinate. The flowering period extends from late spring to summer. The flowers of Araujia sericifera resemble those of Stephanotis floribunda in some respects, a vine that also belongs to the dogbane family.

The pear-shaped fruits are large pods, about 8–10 centimetres (3.1–3.9 in) long. They contain many black seeds attached to silky hairs that enable them to be distributed by the wind. The fruits outwardly resemble those of chayote or choko (Sechium edule), hence the name false choko.

=== Insect trap ===
The structure of the flower includes a number of wedge-shaped openings that function as an insect trap (hence its English name of "cruel plant"), without being a carnivorous plant, where it occasionally and inadvertently traps the pollinator's proboscis, leading to its death. When the foragers put their tongue in the flower, it is blocked by hooks and only the most robust insects manage to free themselves. The insects can die in the flower if the captivity lasts too long. The hummingbird hawk-moth, monarch butterfly, and some bees are often victims of this plant.

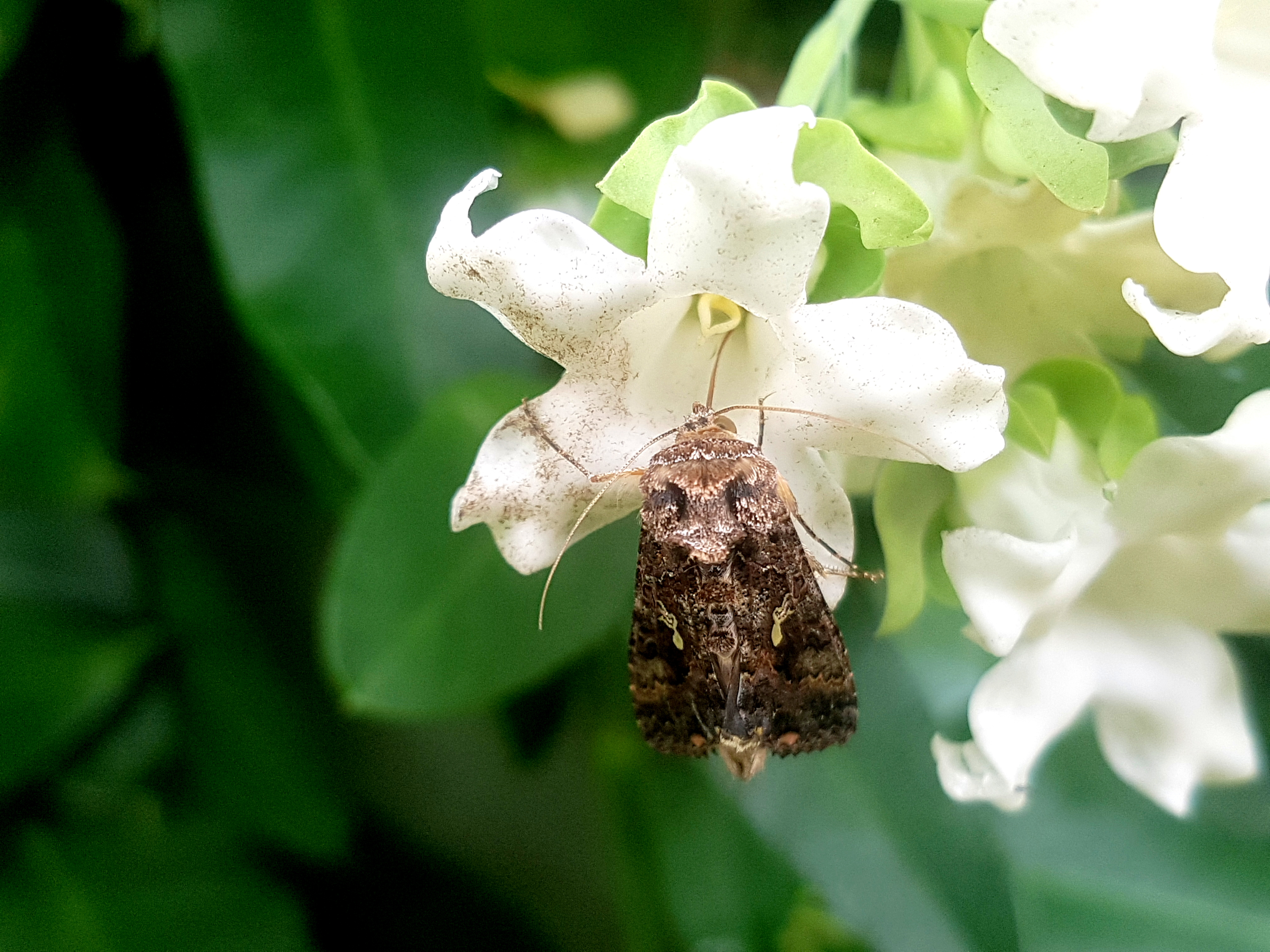
Moth's proboscis becomes caught within the flower's rigid anther wings.

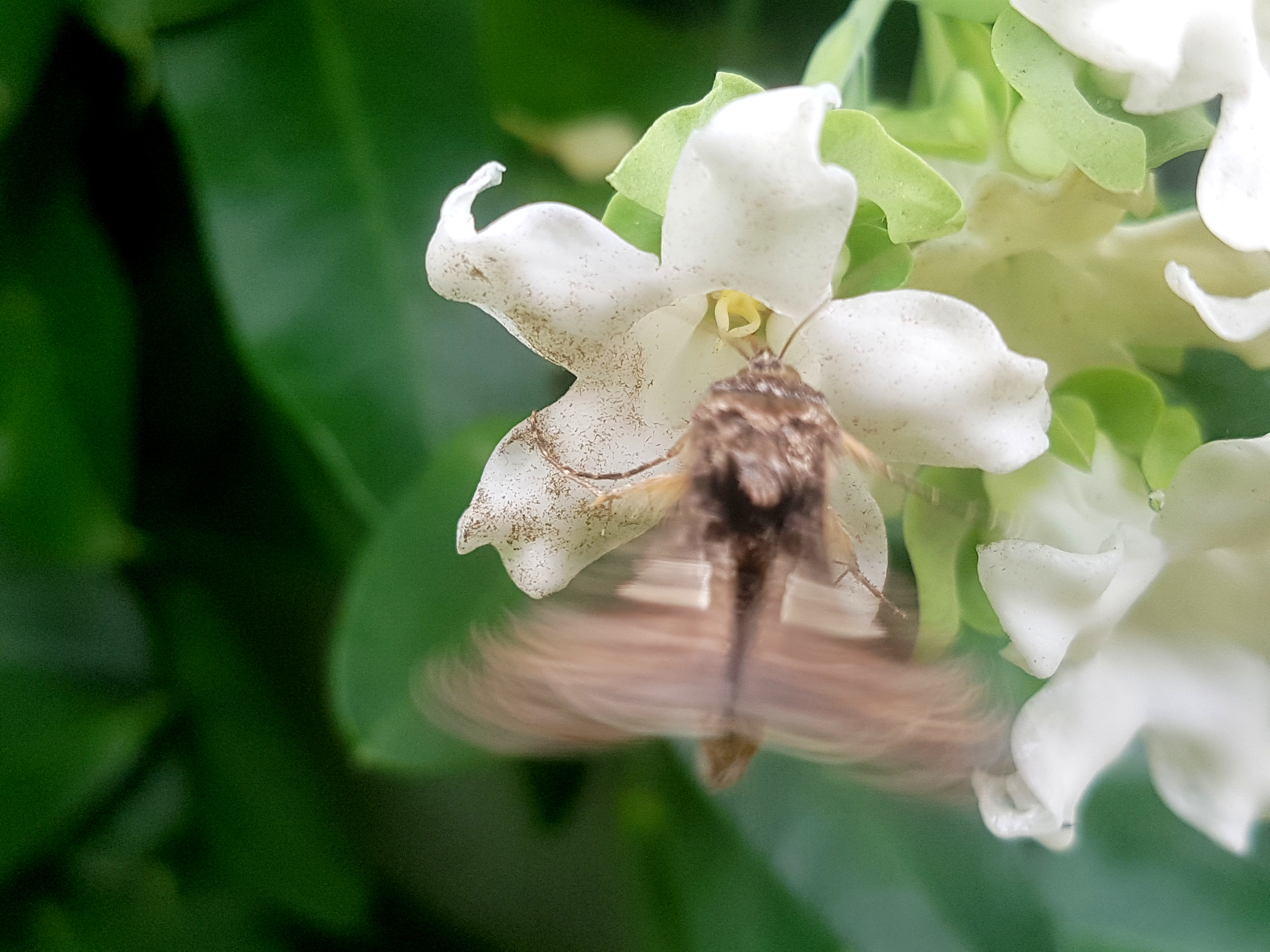
Trapped, the moth frantically struggles to free itself.

== Distribution ==
The plant is native to South America: Peru mainly, but also Argentina, Brazil, and Uruguay.

It was introduced to Europe and other areas as an ornamental plant, but it is now considered a noxious weed. The plant is now widely distributed in France by horticultural networks as a climbing and scent plant. It thrives in rich soil in sunny locations (possibly also in partial shade) and becomes perennial when protected from frost. The plant's geographical distribution included southern Europe, South Africa, North America (California, Georgia, North Carolina), South America (Argentina, Brazil, Paraguay, Uruguay), Australia, and New Zealand in 2024.

== Habitat ==
These plants grow in wastelands with trees and hedges, in forests and in rocky places or cliffs. They prefer sunny or partially shady places, at an altitude of 0–1,800 metres (0–5,906 ft) above sea level.

The fast-growing vines can cover a tree canopy in two or three years, competing with the tree for light, water, and nutrients. They damage trees by this competition and by twining so tightly around their branches that it girdles them.

== Butterflies ==
The plant can be used as an alternative food source for caterpillars of the monarch butterfly. Although monarch caterpillars are not known to occur naturally on the plant, they will readily feed on leaves when supplies of Gomphocarpus physocarpus (swan plant) have run out.

== Toxicity ==
Moth plant is toxic for some people. Skin contact with its sap can cause rashes. Contact with the eyes, in particular, can cause severe discomfort.

== Gallery ==
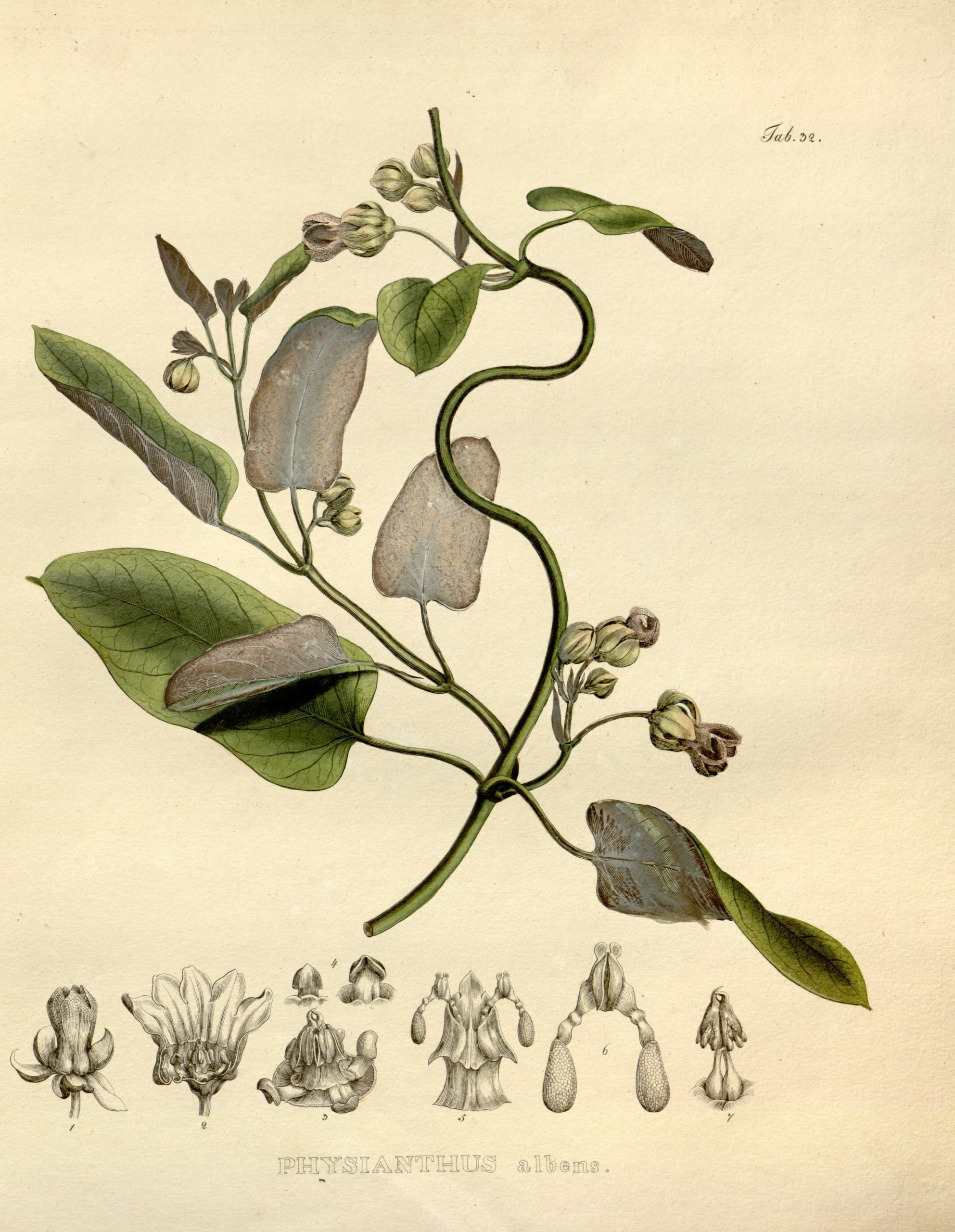
Illustration showing plant details

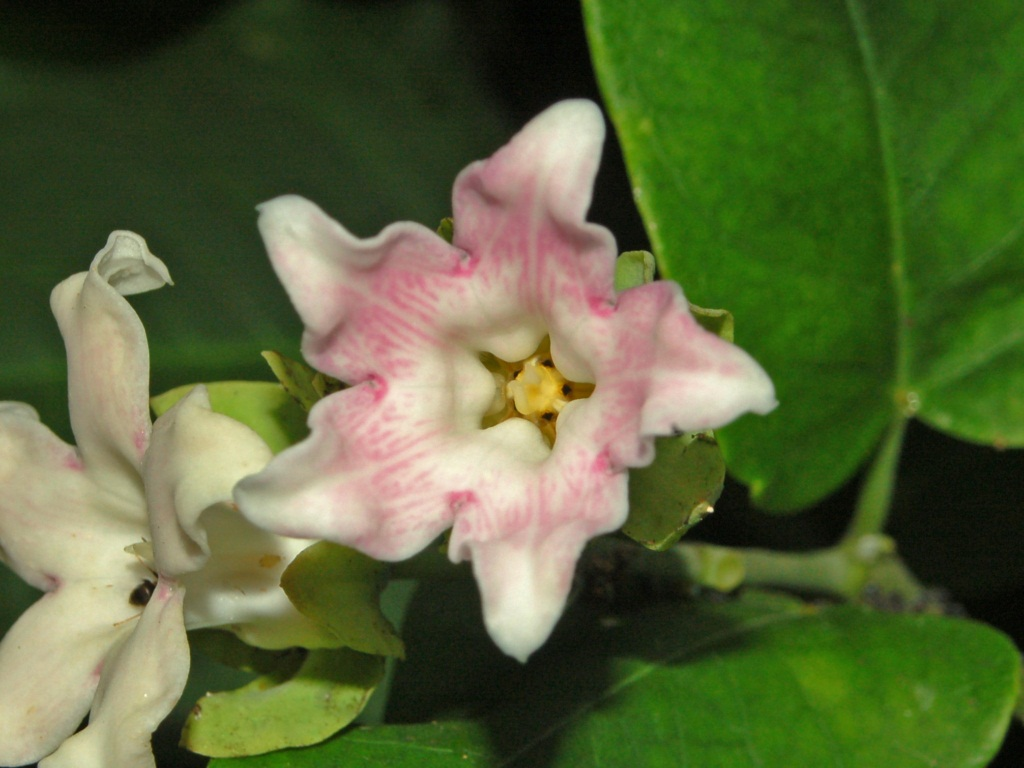
Pink flower

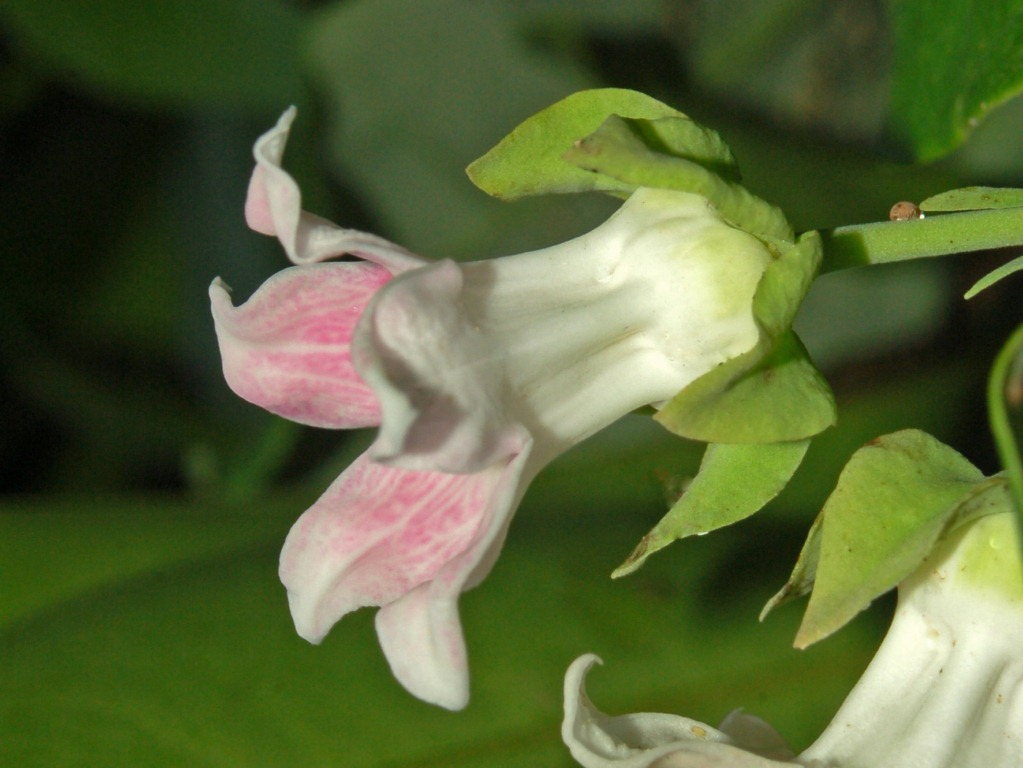
Close-up of a flower, lateral view

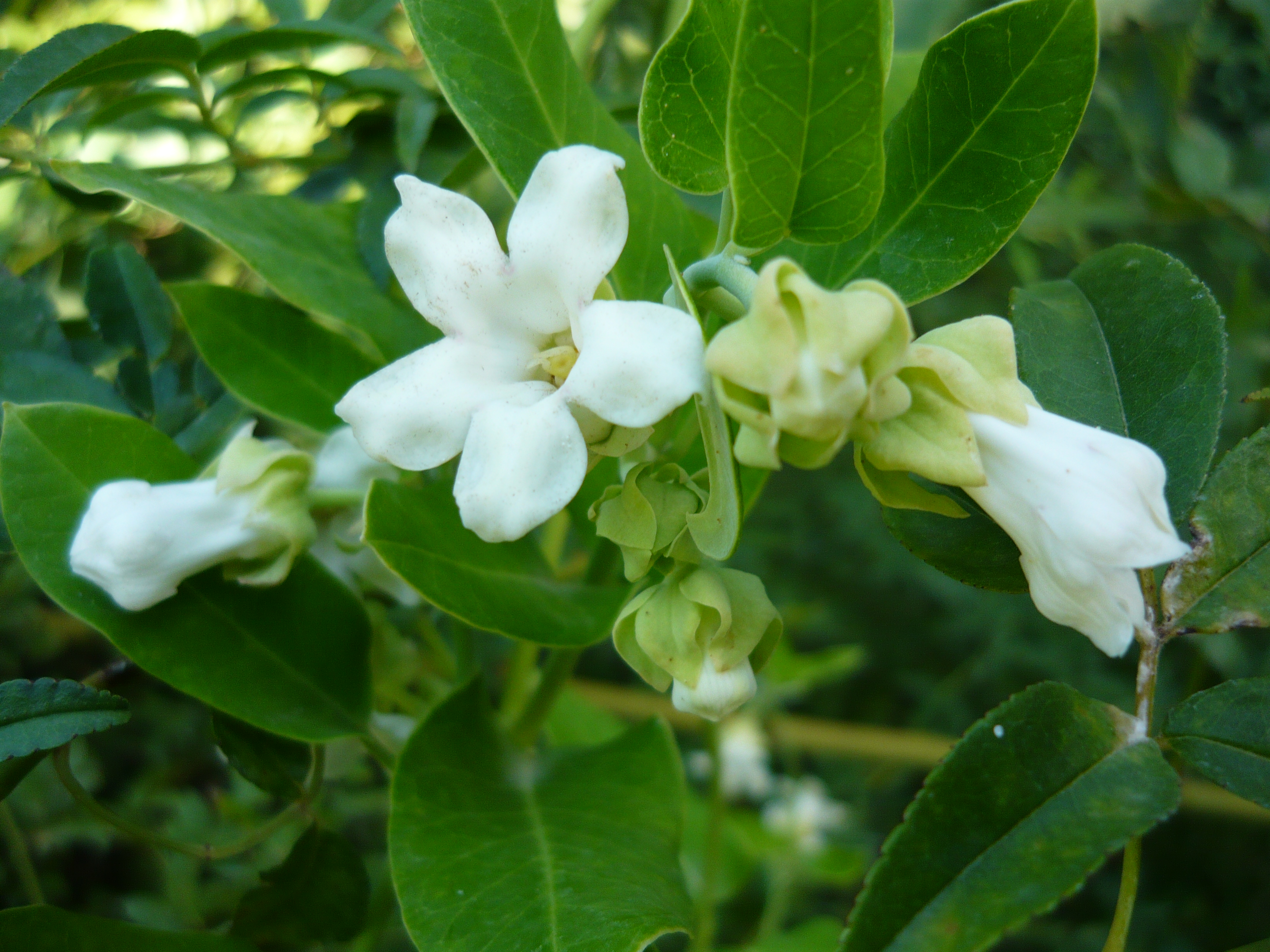
White flower

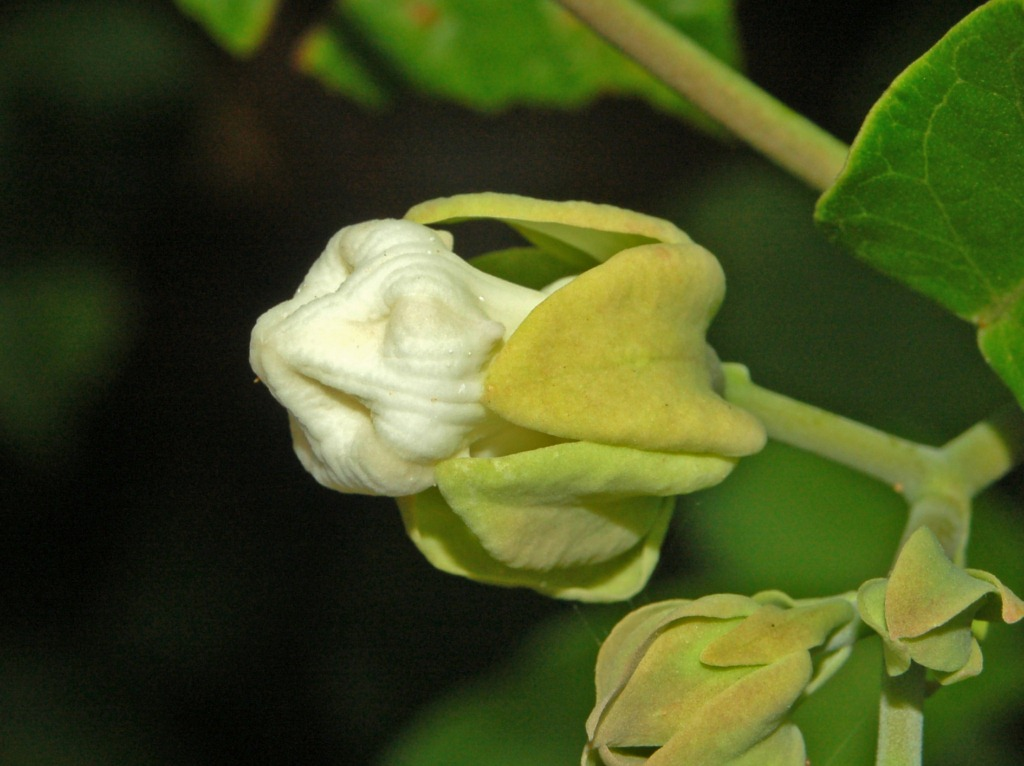
Bud

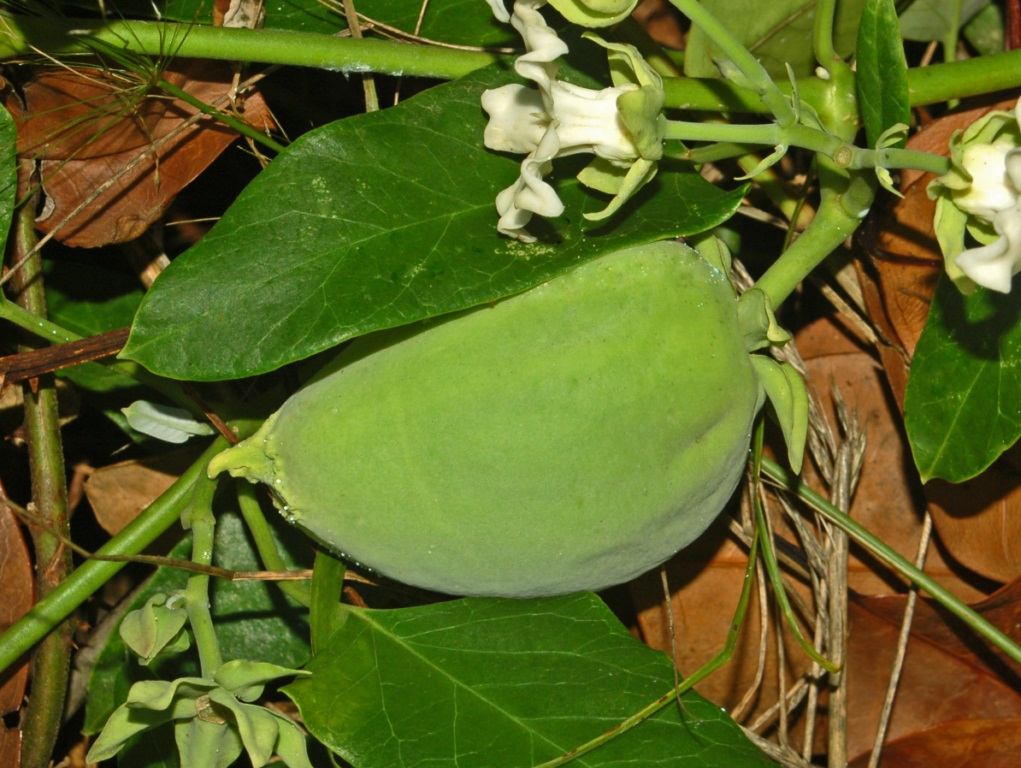
Fruit

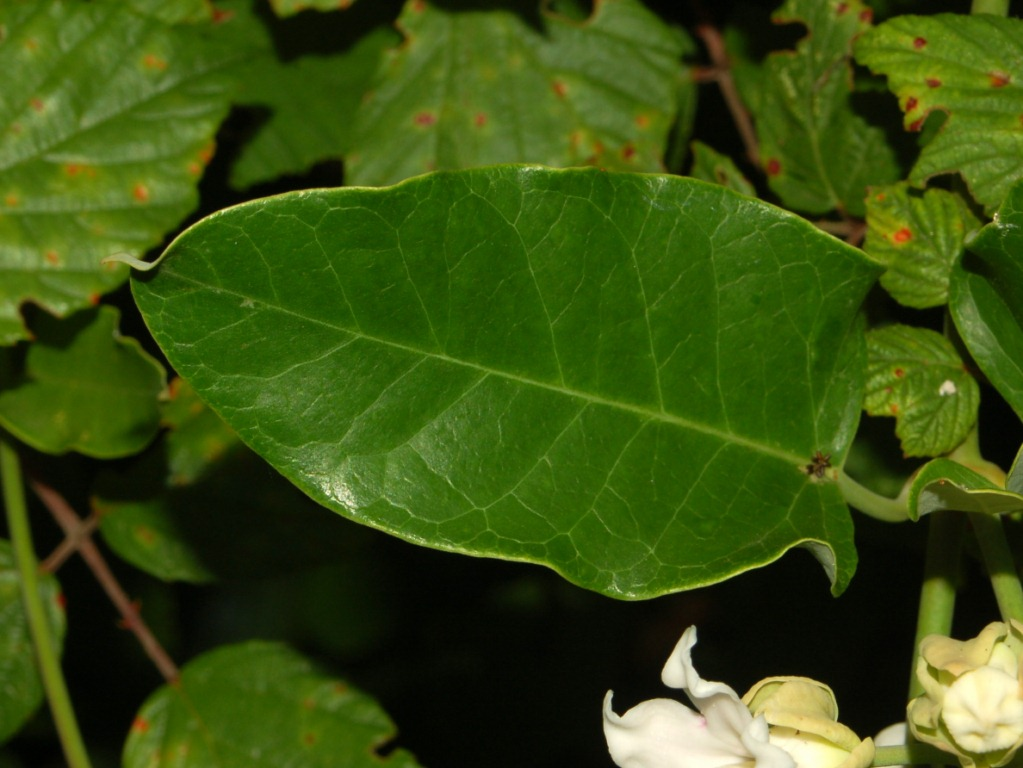
Leaf

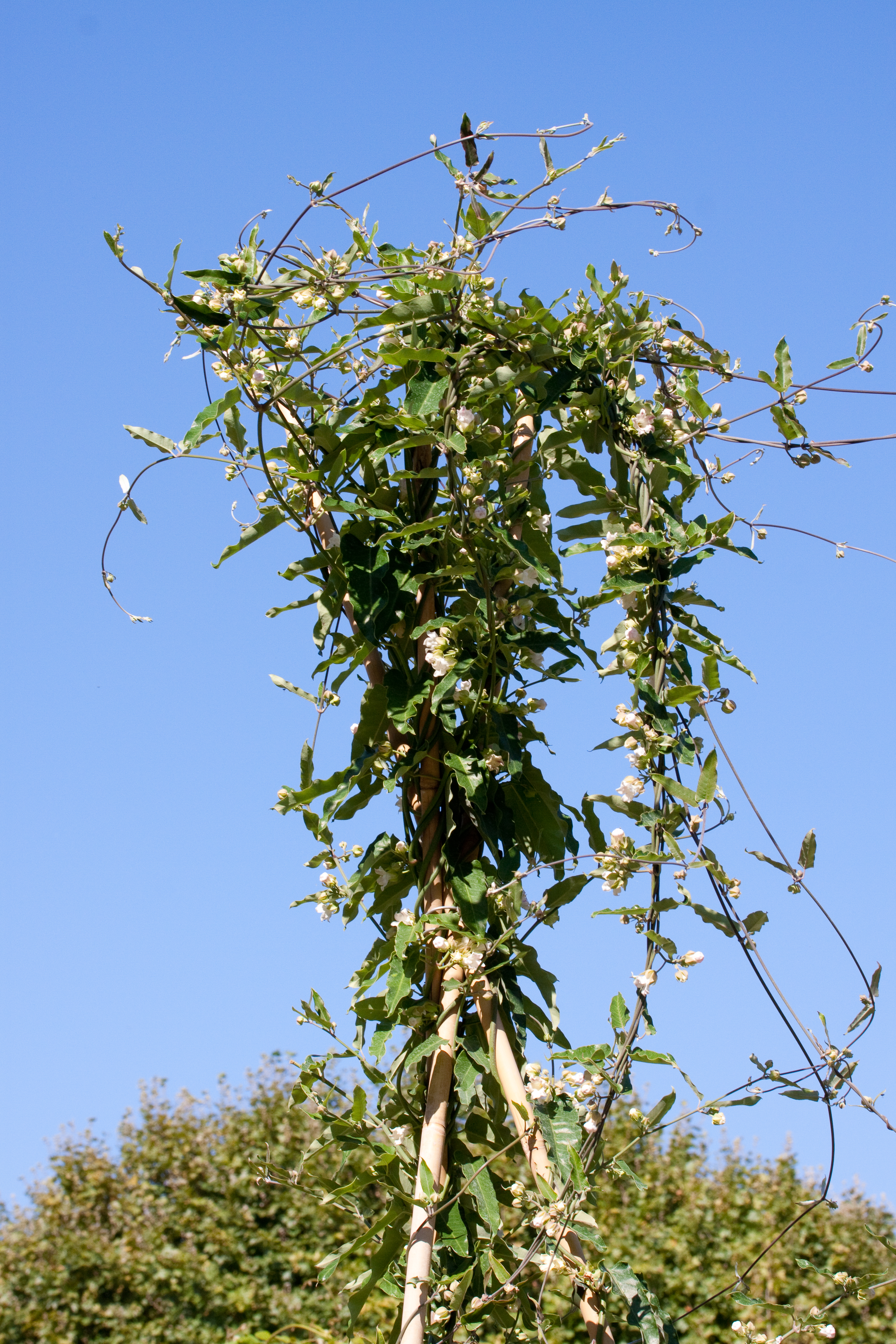
Habit

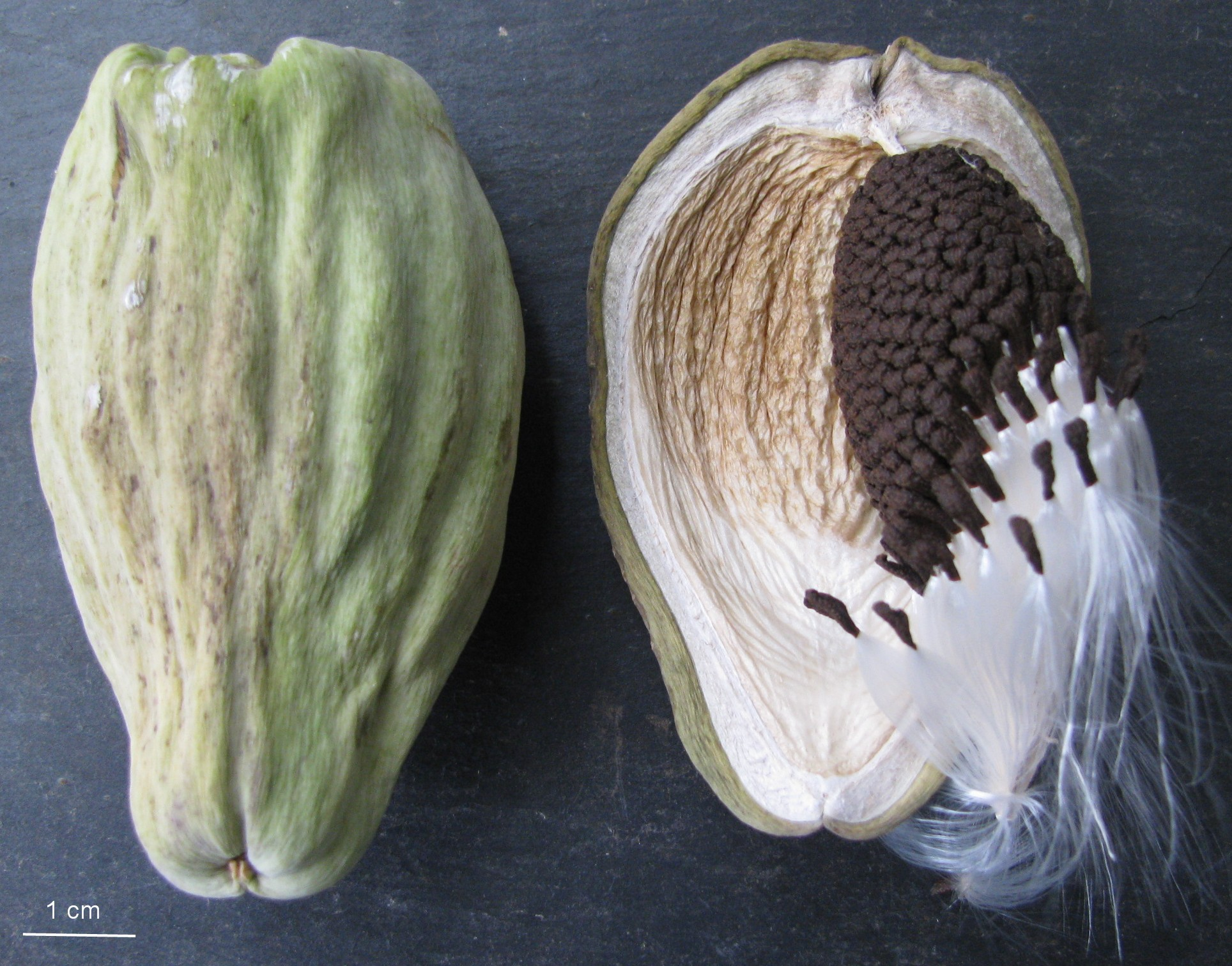
Inside fruit
