= Birger Hatlebakk =

Norwegian politician

Birger Hatlebakk (20 August 1912 – 27 March 1997) from Elnesvågen was a Norwegian industrialist and politician for the Liberal Party.

He founded Moxy Engineering in Elnesvågen and Glamox in Molde.

In politics, he served as a deputy representative to the Norwegian Parliament from Møre og Romsdal during the term 1969–1973.
