= Sylte =

Sylte may refer to:

== Places ==
- Sylte, Hustadvika, a village in Hustadvika Municipality in Møre og Romsdal, Norway
- Sylte, Norddal, a village in Fjord Municipality in Møre og Romsdal, Norway
- Sylte, Surnadal, a village in Surnadal Municipality in Møre og Romsdal, Norway
- Sylte, Vanylven, a village in Vanylven Municipality in Møre og Romsdal, Norway
- Sylte, Trollhättan, a village in Trollhättan in Västra Götaland, Sweden
- Tresfjord Municipality, a former municipality in Møre og Romsdal, Norway (called Sylte Municipality between 1899 and 1922)

== Other ==
- Tommy Sylte, a Norwegian footballer
- Oskar Sylte Mineralvannfabrikk, company
