= Myrbostad Church =

Church in Møre og Romsdal, Norway

- Myrbostad kyrkje
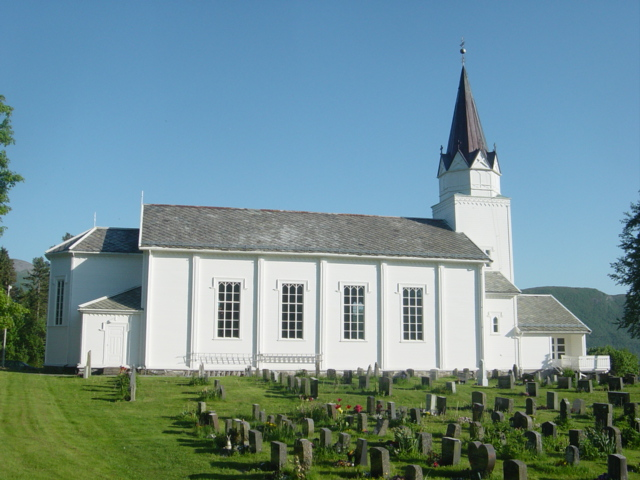
- View of the church
- Myrbostad Church
- 62°51′09″N 7°13′00″E
- Location: Hustadvika Municipality, Møre og Romsdal
- Country: Norway
- Denomination: Church of Norway
- Churchmanship: Evangelical Lutheran

History
- Status: Parish church
- Founded: 1880
- Consecrated: 1880

Architecture
- Functional status: Active
- Architect: Johannes Henrik Nissen
- Architectural type: Long church
- Completed: 1880 (146 years ago)

Specifications
- Capacity: 400
- Materials: Wood

Administration
- Diocese: Møre bispedømme
- Deanery: Molde domprosti
- Parish: Vågøy og Myrbostad
- Norwegian Cultural Heritage Site
- Type: Church
- Status: Not protected
- ID: 85079

Myrbostad Church (Norwegian: Myrbostad kyrkje) is a parish church of the Church of Norway in Hustadvika Municipality in Møre og Romsdal county, Norway. It is located on the east side of the village of Elnesvågen at the inner end of the Frænfjorden. It is one of the two churches for the Vågøy og Myrbostad parish which is part of the Molde domprosti (arch-deanery) in the Diocese of Møre. The white, wooden church was built in a long church design in 1880 using plans drawn up by the Christiania-based architect Johannes Henrik Nissen. The church seats about 400 people.

== History ==
The people of Elnesvågen historically attended the Vågøy Church which was located about 8 kilometres (5.0 mi) away by boat or nearly 25 kilometres (16 mi) away by road. In the 1870s, plans were made to build a church near Elnesvågen so the people would be much closer to their church. The plan was to maintain two churches for the parish (the old Vågøy Church and the new Myrbostad Church) and that the new church would become the main church for the parish. The church was designed by Henrik Nissen. The building was constructed and consecrated in 1880. The long church has a large rectangular nave with a chancel on the east end that was flanked by two sacristies on the north and south sides. The church was renovated and enlarged in 1973, including adding a new, larger entrance.

== Media gallery ==
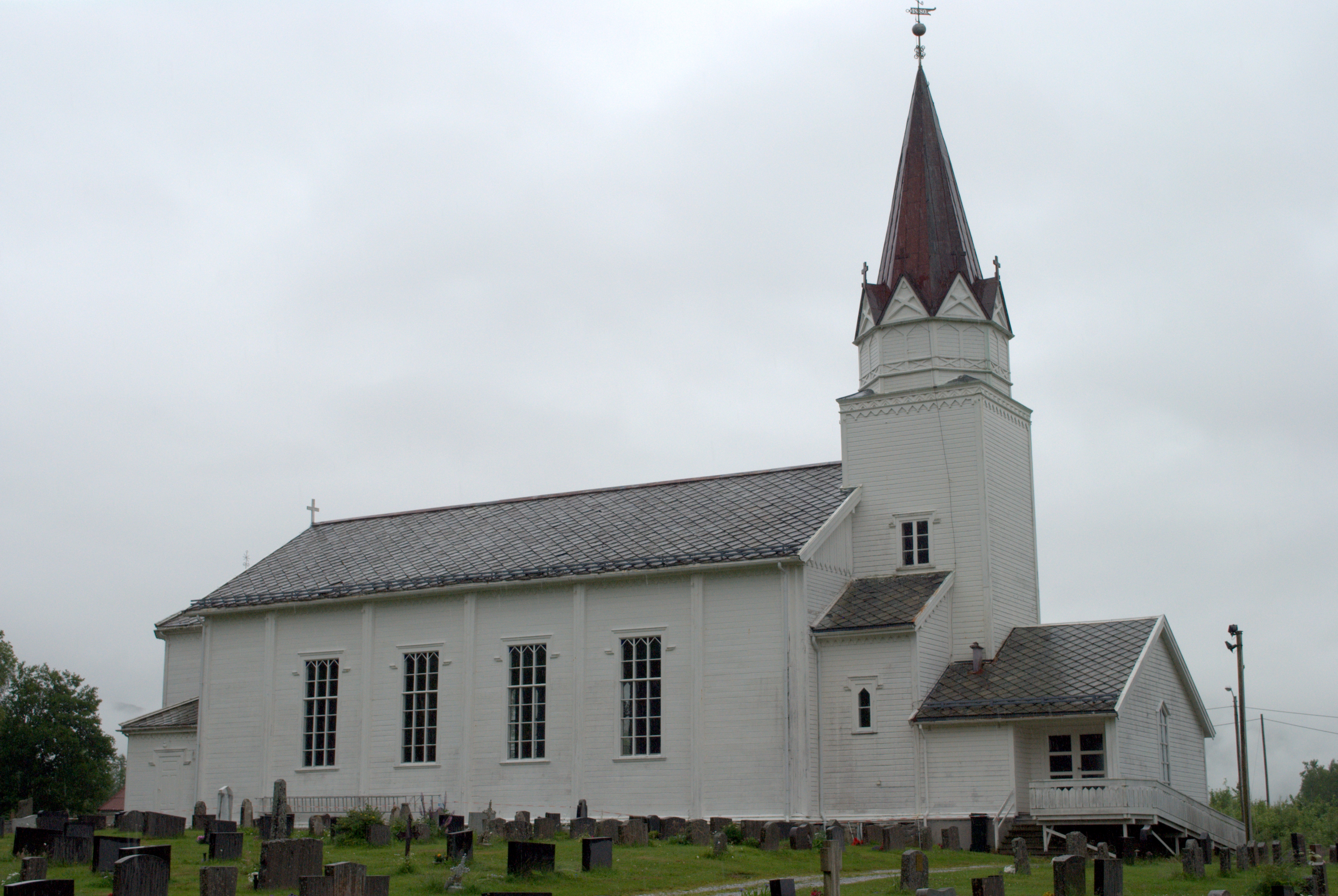

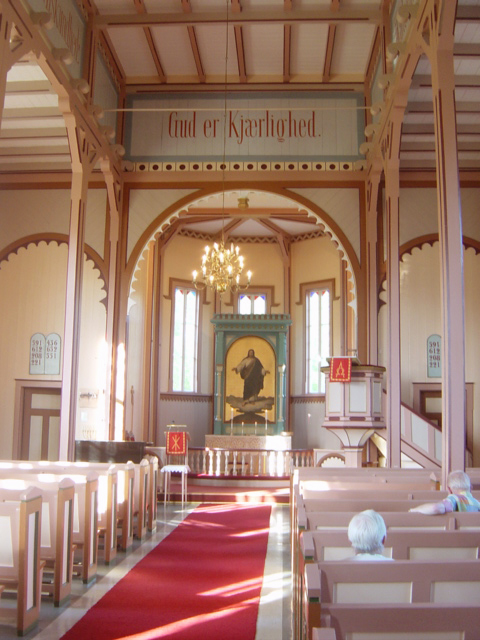

== See also ==
- List of churches in Møre
