= Moxy Engineering =

Norwegian dump truck manufacturer

Doosan Moxy
- Type: Subsidiary
- Industry: Construction industries
- Founded: 1969; 57 years ago
- Founder: Birger Hatlebakk
- Headquarters: Elnesvågen, Norway
- Number of employees: 142 (2026)
- Parent: Doosan Group

Moxy Engineering is a Norwegian manufacturer of articulated haulers (dump trucks) for off-road use in the earth moving and construction industries. Moxy was founded by the industrialist Birger Hatlebakk, who had previously founded the Glamox factory in Molde Municipality.

== History ==
2008-2011 logo

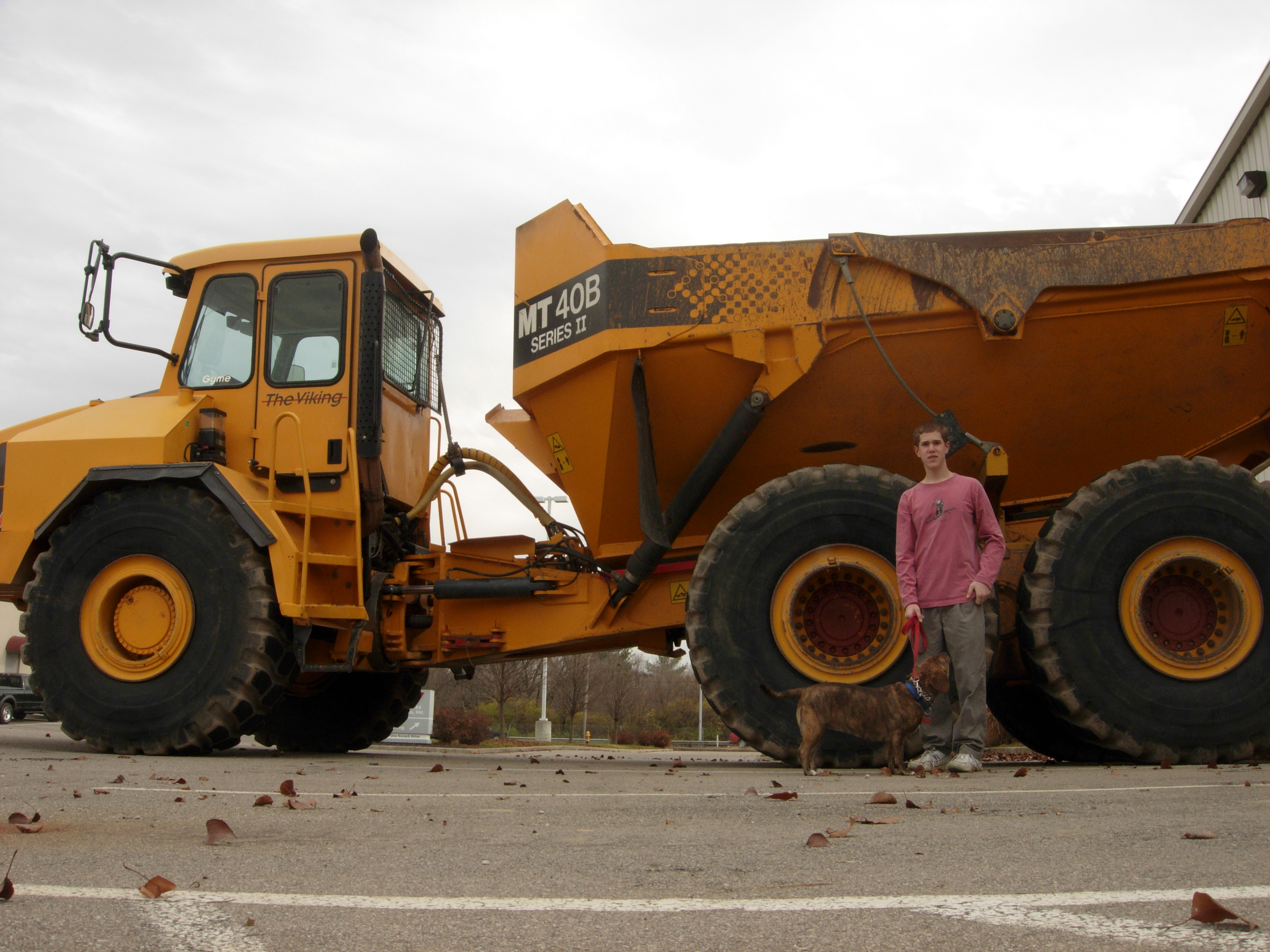
A Moxy MT 40B

Moxy built the first prototype dump truck in 1970. The first model was a heavy duty dump truck drawn by a powerful tractor with rear wheels driven by hydraulic motors. The next version, an articulated dump truck driven by a Scania diesel engine, D20, was also finished in 1970. The first prototypes were built in Molde Municipality, but then the company moved to Varhol by Elnesvågen in Fræna Municipality, where a new factory was built. About the same time Moxy acquired the company Øveraasen Motorfabrikk & Mekaniske Verksted (nn, in Gjøvik Municipality), which provided Moxy with useful engineering technology.

In 1972 Moxy marketed its first articulated dump truck, the Viking D15, which used a bogie under the dump box and six wheel drive. The trucks were well received by the earth moving industry. Around 1980 the company was acquired by English company Brown Engineering, who changed the name to Moxy Industries AS.

During the 80's several new dump trucks were developed and Moxy gained a good reputation in the market place and exported their products to several countries around the globe. In order to increase their production capacity Moxy cooperated with Tallmek Smøla AS, who produced the dump boxes. In the 80's Moxy started a cooperation with the Japanese company Komatsu. During one period Moxy produced dump trucks that Komatsu sold under their own brand name. In 1991 the Norwegian state owned company AS Olivin and Komatsu together acquired Moxy and changed the company name to Moxy Trucks AS. Olivin owned 2/3 and Komatsu 1/3 of the shares. The new owners injected fresh capital and the Moxy dump trucks were sold through the Komatsu sales network, which led to a large increase in sales.

In 2000 Komatsu withdrew from the partnership and Moxy lost a number of its sales outlets, which led to a reduction in sales. The drop in sales in turn led to a reduction in the workforce, this coincided with the Norwegian state's efforts to partly privatise Olivin (49% of the shares were sold to private investors). In order to make Olivin more attractive for prospective buyers the state injected 50 mil NOK into the company and split off the struggling Moxy as a state owned company. However, in 2002 51% of the shares in Moxy were sold to the company Spilka Invest AS (from Ålesund Municipality). A few months later the Norwegian economy started to improve and the sales of Moxy dump trucks increased.

Despite the economic problems the Moxy dump truck has a good reputation in the earth moving industry and the English Thomson group acquired the company's assets, production continued under the new company Moxy Engineering AS. In 2008, Doosan Infracore's Construction Equipment Business Group acquired 100% of the company from Thomson Group, and changed the name as Doosan Moxy AS. In 2011, the Moxy name was dropped and latest trucks were marketed under just the Doosan brand, rather than the previous Doosan-Moxy marque.

== Product range ==
- DA30 (28 ton capacity)
- DA40 (40 ton capacity)
