= Arne Sæter =

Norwegian politician

Member of the Storting from Møre og Romsdal
- In office 1969 – 14 September 1973
- Succeeded by: Sverre Moen

Mayor of Rindal Municipality
- In office 1963 – 1967

Personal details
- Born: 21 August 1913
- Died: 14 September 1973 (aged 60)
- Party: Christian Democratic Party

Arne Sæter (21 August 1913 in Surnadal Municipality – 14 September 1973) was a Norwegian politician for the Christian Democratic Party.

He was elected to the Norwegian Parliament from Møre og Romsdal in 1969. Shortly before the end of his term, he died and was replaced by Sverre Moen.

On the local level he was a member of the municipal council of Rindal Municipality from 1959 to 1971, serving as mayor from 1963 to 1967. From 1963 to 1967 he was also a member of Møre og Romsdal county council.

Outside politics he graduated as cand.theol. in 1940, and worked as a priest.
