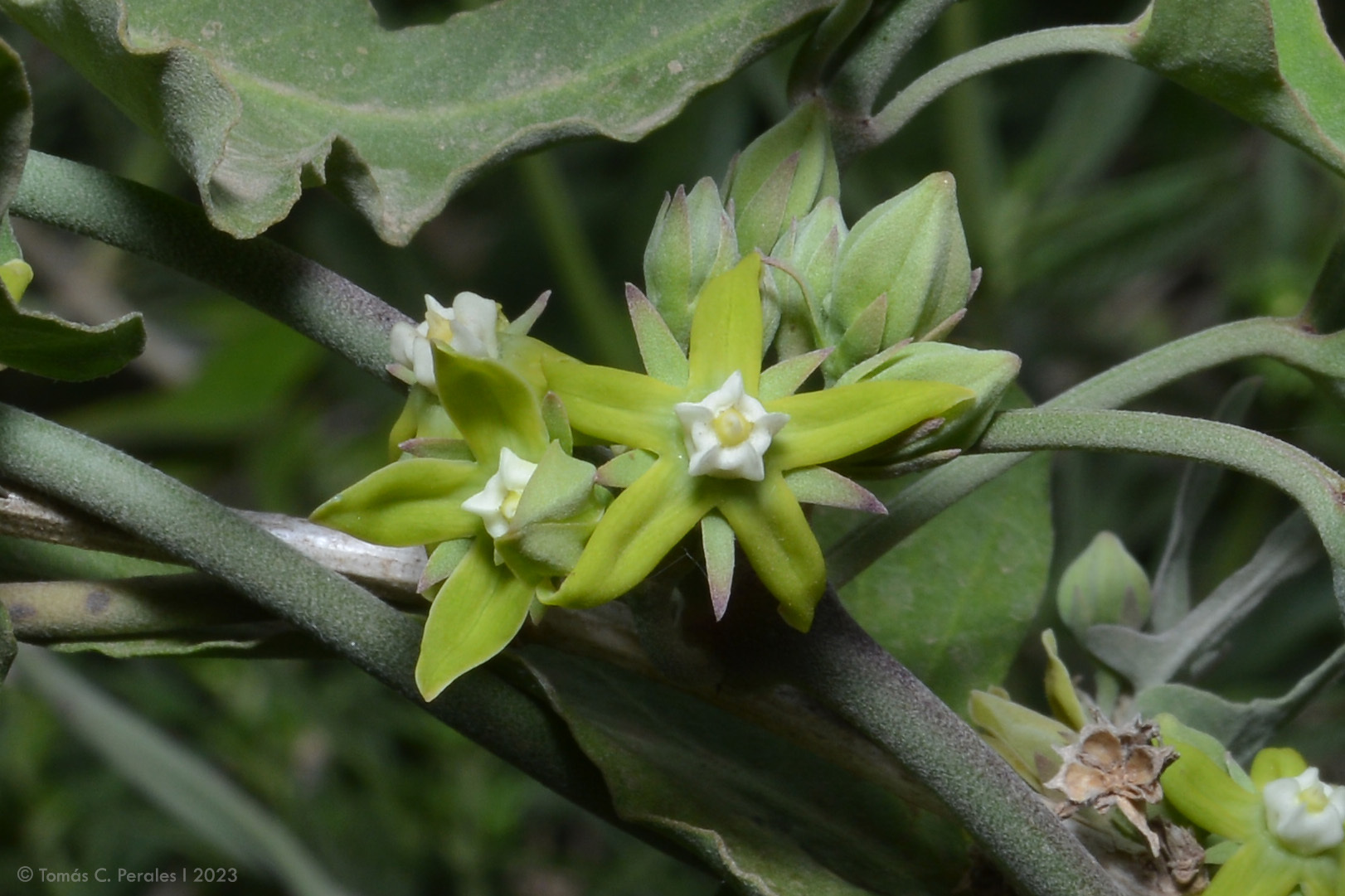
- Araujia brachystephana

Scientific classification
- Kingdom: Plantae
- Clade: Tracheophytes
- Clade: Angiosperms
- Clade: Eudicots
- Clade: Asterids
- Order: Gentianales
- Family: Apocynaceae
- Subfamily: Asclepiadoideae
- Tribe: Asclepiadeae
- Genus: Araujia; Brot.

= Araujia =

Genus of plants

Araujia is a small genus of perennial vines in the dogbane family first described as a genus in 1817. The group is native to South America.

== Species ==
The following species are recognised in the genus Araujia:

- Araujia angustifolia (Hook. & Arn.) Steud. - Brazil, Paraguay, Uruguay, NE Argentina
- Araujia brachystephana (Griseb.) Fontella & Goyder
- Araujia hassleriana (Malme) Fontella & Goyder
- Araujia herzogii (Schltr.) Fontella & Goyder - Bolivia
- Araujia megapotamica (Spreng.) G.Don - Brazil, Uruguay, NE Argentina
- Araujia odorata (Hook. & Arn.) Fontella & Goyder
- Araujia plumosa Schltr. - Brazil, Paraguay, Bolivia, NW Argentina
- Araujia scalae (Hicken) Fontella & Goyder
- Araujia sericifera Brot. - white bladderflower, cruel vine - Peru, Brazil; naturalized in parts of South Africa + United States
- Araujia stormiana Morong
- Araujia stuckertiana (Kurtz ex Heger) Fontella & Goyder - Cordoba in Argentina
- Araujia subhastata E.Fourn. - Brazil
- Araujia variegata (Griseb.) Fontella & Goyder
