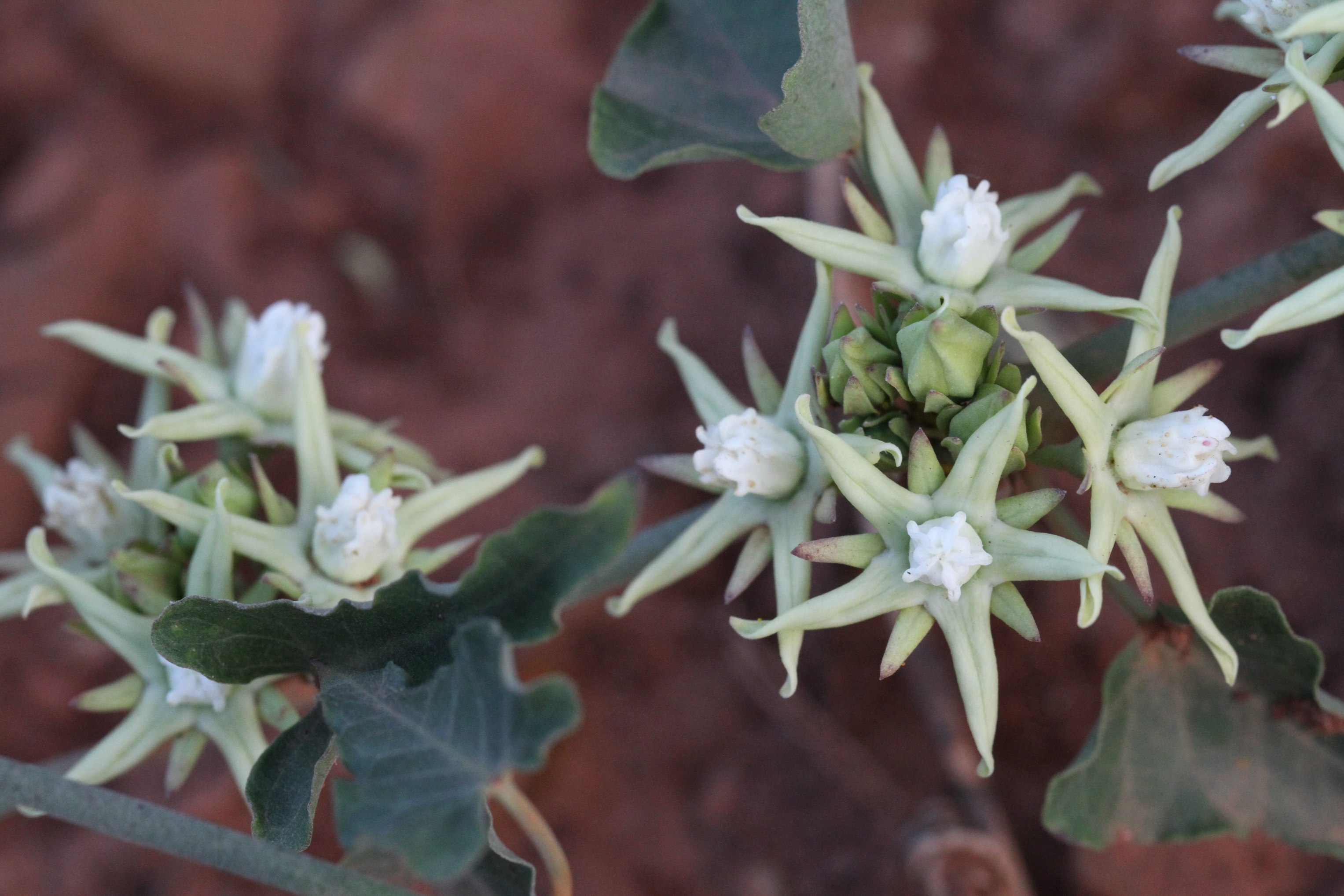
- Araujia odorata

Scientific classification
- Kingdom: Plantae
- Clade: Tracheophytes
- Clade: Angiosperms
- Clade: Eudicots
- Clade: Asterids
- Order: Gentianales
- Family: Apocynaceae
- Genus: Araujia
- Species: A. odorata

Binomial name
- Araujia odorata (Hook. & Arn.) Lindl.

= Araujia odorata =

Species of plant

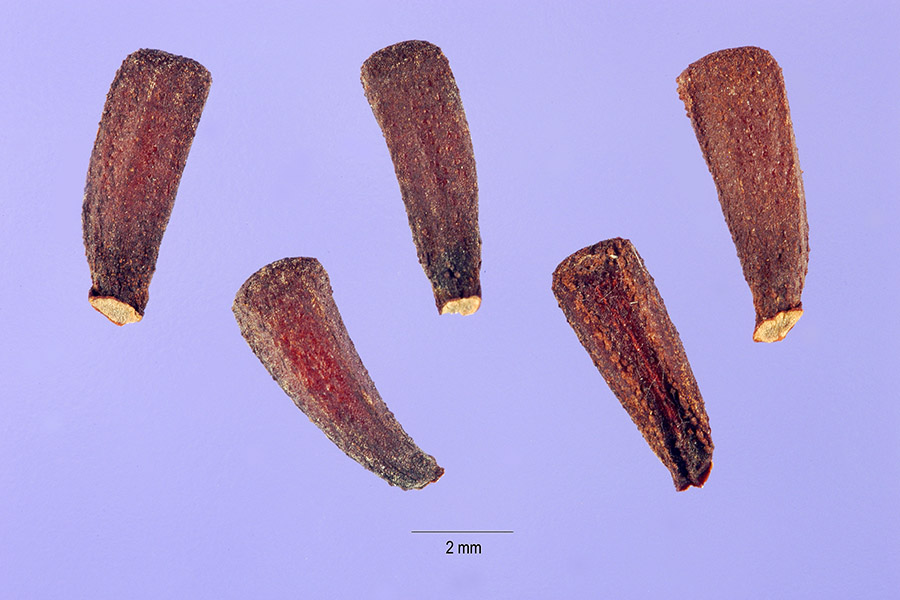
Morrenia odorata seeds

Araujia odorata, formerly known as Morrenia odorata, the latexplant or strangler vine, is a plant in the family Apocynaceae, which is native to South America (Brazil, Bolivia, Argentina, Paraguay, Uruguay). This plant is cited in Flora Brasiliensis by Carl Friedrich Philipp von Martius. The species is widely cultivated as an ornamental.

homonym

Morrenia odorata Hort. ex D.G. Kuntze not (Hook. & Arn.) Lindl. now Mikania glomerata
