= Sverre Moen =

Norwegian politician

Sverre Moen (9 May 1921 – 31 July 1987) was a Norwegian politician for the Christian Democratic Party.

He was born in Fræna Municipality as a son of farmer Albert Moen (1883–1957) and housewife Anna Pauline Rødal (1887–1970). He pursued agricultural education and worked as a secretary, consultant and municipal agronomist between 1943 and 1977. From 1977 to 1987, he served as the director of Felleskjøpet in Nordmøre and Romsdal.

He was a member of the school board for Fræna Municipality from 1953 to 1963 (and the county school board from 1976 to 1979), and the municipal council of Fræna Municipality from 1955 to 1959 and 1963 to 1975, serving as mayor from 1963 to 1973. From 1963 to 1979 he was also a member of Møre og Romsdal county council. He served as a deputy representative to the Parliament of Norway from Møre og Romsdal during the terms 1969–1973 and 1973–1977. From September to October 1973 he served as a regular representative, filling in for Arne Sæter who had died.

He was a board member in Statens Kornforretning from 1974 to 1976 and Felleskjøpet from 1977, and was also involved in the Norwegian Lutheran Mission. In 1986 he received the King's Medal of Merit in silver.
