= Høgheitinden =

Mountain in Hustadvika, Norway

- Høgheia / Heiane
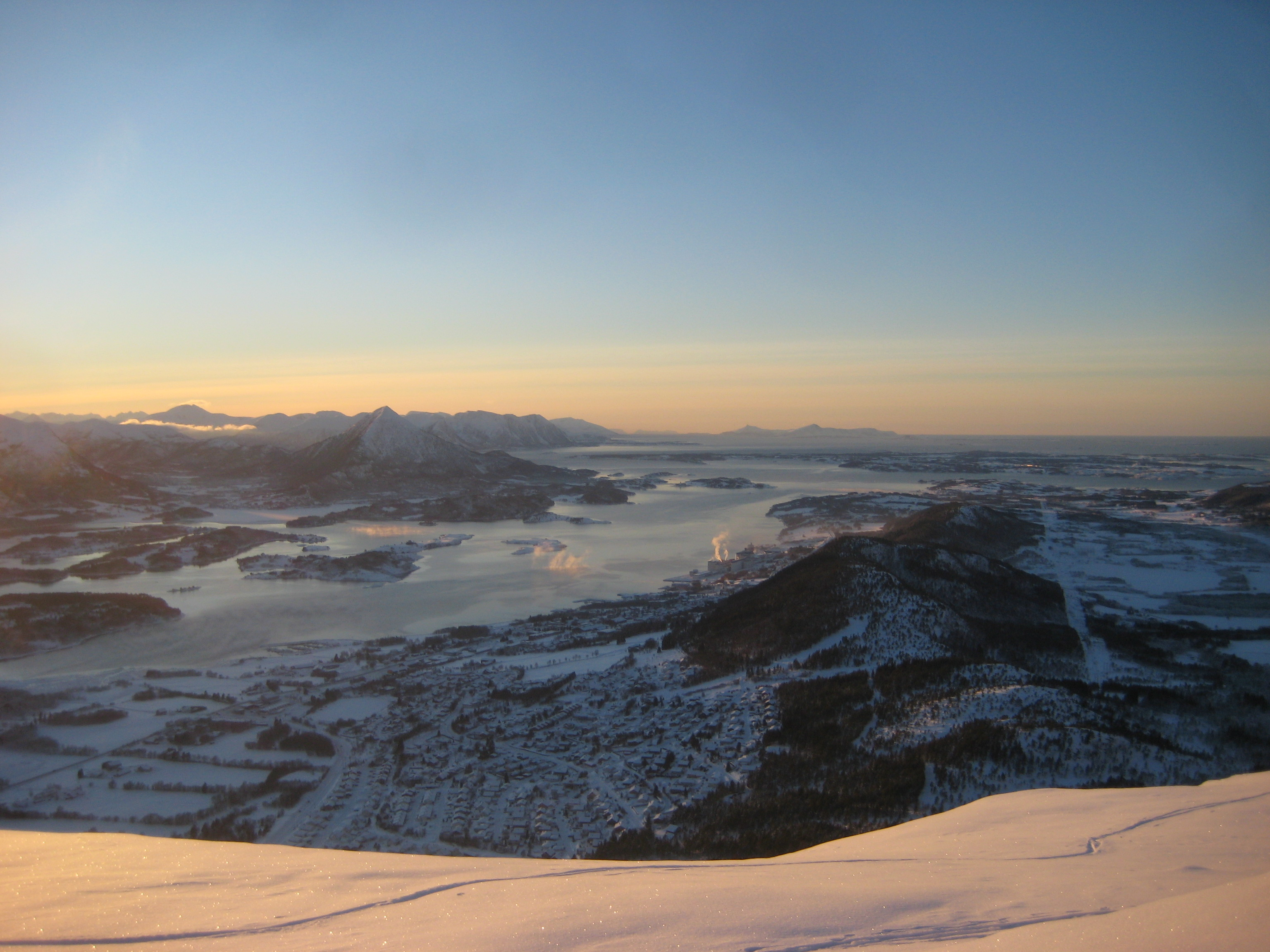
- View of Elnesvågen from the mountain

Highest point
- Elevation: 694 m (2,277 ft)
- Coordinates: 62.8737°N 7.2160°E

Geography
- Interactive map of the mountain
- Location: Møre og Romsdal, Norway

Høgheitinden is a mountain in Hustadvika Municipality in Møre og Romsdal county, Norway. The 694-metre (2,277 ft) tall mountain sits immediately to the northeast of the village of Elnesvågen. Locals refer to the mountain as Heiane, and they distinguish between the popular ridge and the summit using the names Lågheiane for the ridge and Høgheiane for the summit.

== See also ==
- List of mountains of Norway
