= Tornes =

Village in Hustadvika Municipality, Norway

- Village
- Interactive map of Tornes
- Location within Møre og Romsdal Location within Norway
- Coordinates: 62.8417°N 7.0298°E
- Country: Norway
- Region: Western Norway
- County: Møre og Romsdal
- District: Romsdal
- Municipality: Hustadvika Municipality

Area
  - Total: 0.46 km^{2} (0.18 sq mi)
- Elevation: 17 m (56 ft)

Population (2024)
  - Total: 521
  - Density: 1,133/km^{2} (2,930/sq mi)
- Time zone: UTC+01:00 (CET)
  - Summer (DST): UTC+02:00 (CEST)
- Post Code: 6443 Tornes i Romsdal

Tornes is a village in Hustadvika Municipality in Møre og Romsdal county, Norway. The village is located along the Julsundet strait at the mouth of the Frænfjorden. It is located about 5 kilometres (3.1 mi) west of the municipal center of Elnesvågen and about 12 kilometres (7.5 mi) south of the village of Bud.

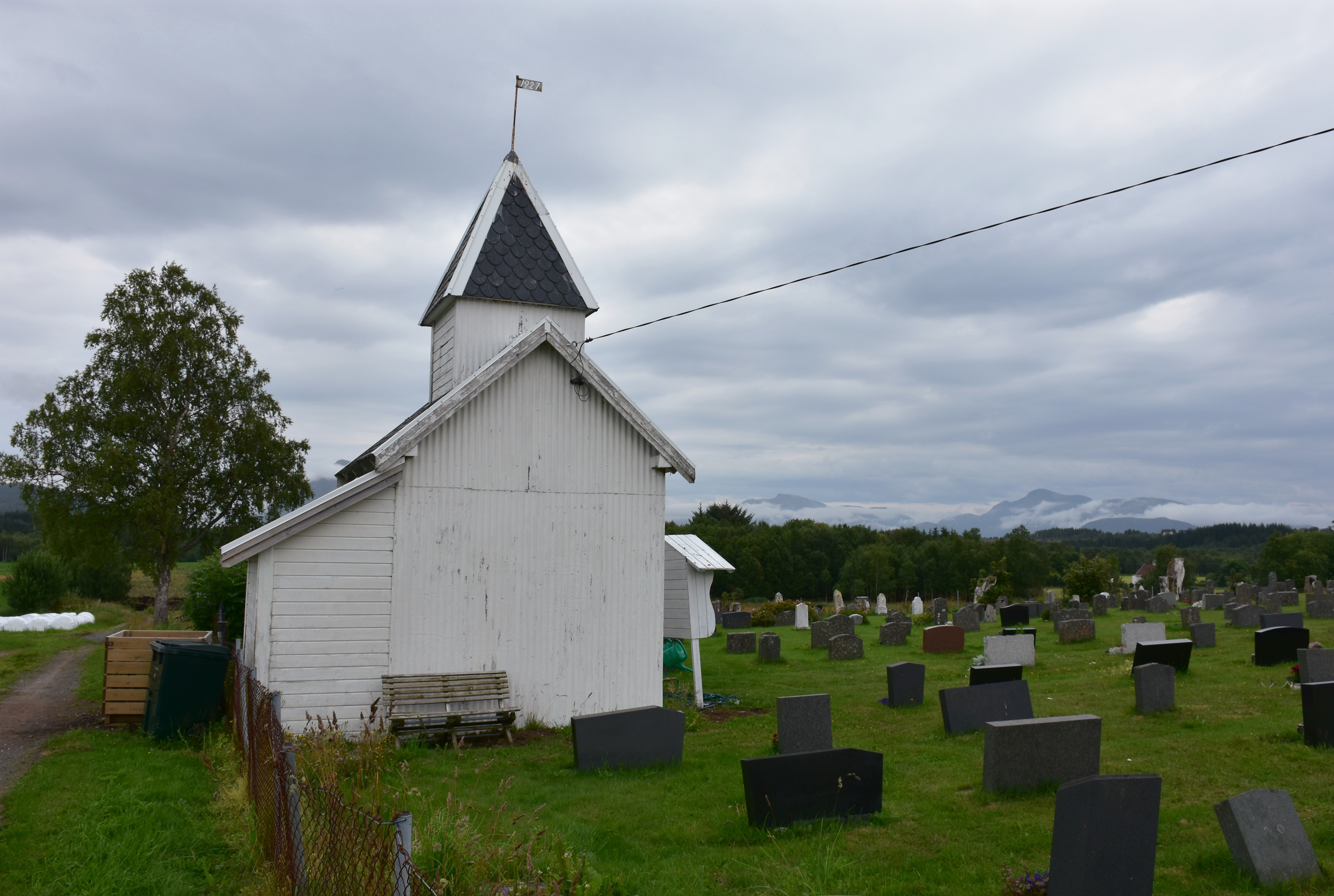
View of the local graveyard.

The 0.46-square-kilometre (110-acre) village has a population (2024) of 521 and a population density of 1,133 inhabitants per square kilometre (2,930/sq mi).
