= Jendemsfjellet =

Mountain in Hustadvika, Norway

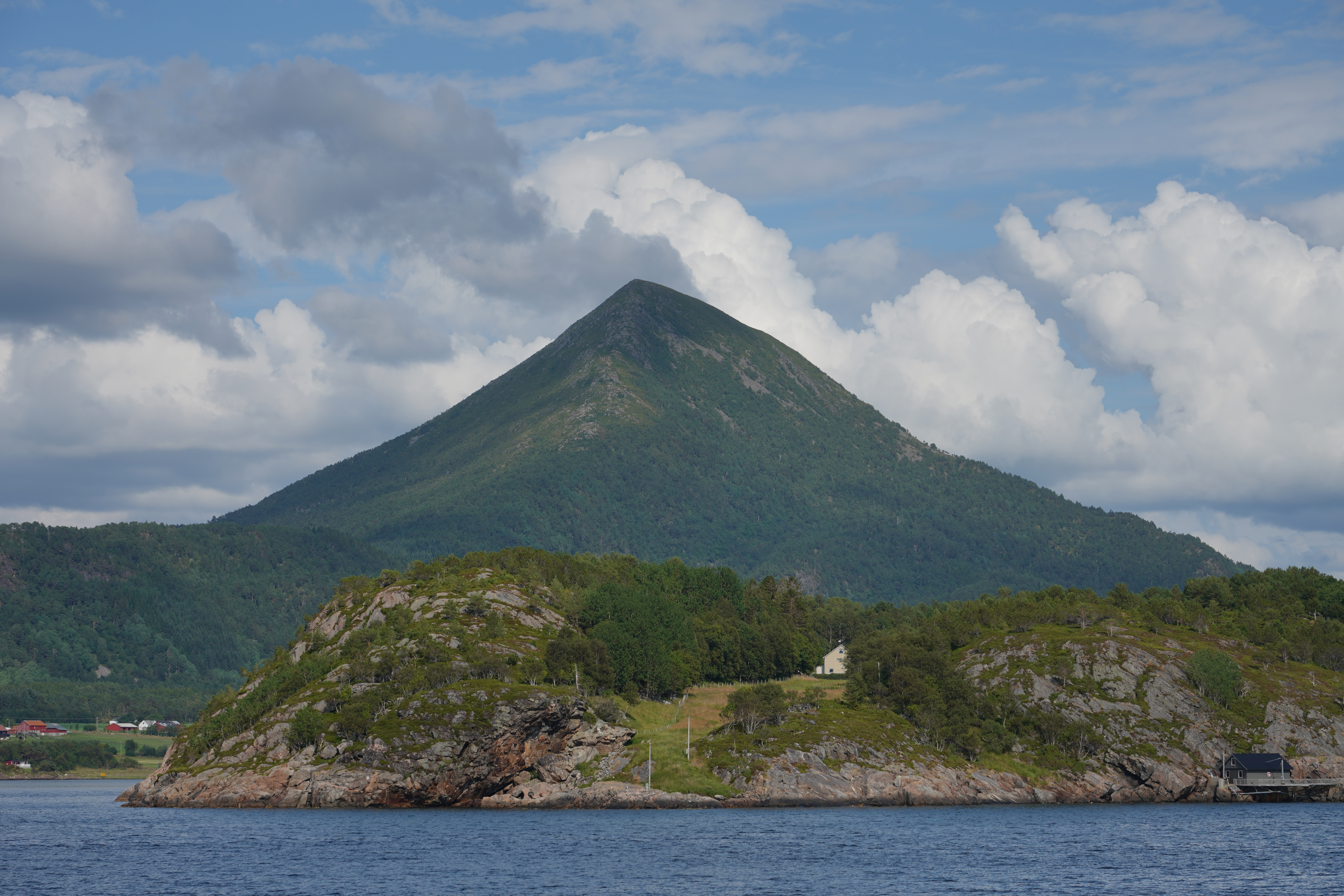

Highest point
- Elevation: 633 m (2,077 ft)
- Prominence: 555 m (1,821 ft)
- Coordinates: 62.8009°N 7.0437°E

Geography
- Interactive map of the mountain
- Location: Møre og Romsdal, Norway

Jendemsfjellet is a mountain in Hustadvika Municipality in Møre og Romsdal county, Norway. The cone-shaped mountain is located just northeast of the villages of Jendem and Hollingen (on the municipal border with Aukra Municipality), southeast of the small island of Vågøya, and southwest of the village of Aureosen. The 633-metre (2,077 ft) mountain sits just east of Julsundet strait and south of Frænafjorden.

== See also ==
- List of mountains of Norway by height
