= Lågheia =

Mountain ridge in Hustadvika, Norway

- Lågheiane
- Interactive map of the mountain

Highest point
- Parent peak: Høgheitinden
- Coordinates: 62.8689°N 7.2030°E

Geography
- Location: Møre og Romsdal, Norway

Lågheia is a mountain ridge in Hustadvika Municipality in Møre og Romsdal county, Norway. The ridge sits at an elevation of 506 metres (1,660 ft) above sea level and it is a lower ridge peak on the larger mountain Høgheitinden. From the top of the ridge, there is a nice view of the village of Elnesvågen and the inner part of Hustadvika Municipality. At the peak, there is a notebook that hikers can sign.

== See also ==
- List of mountains of Norway
