= Elnesvågen =

Village in Hustadvika Municipality, Norway

- Village
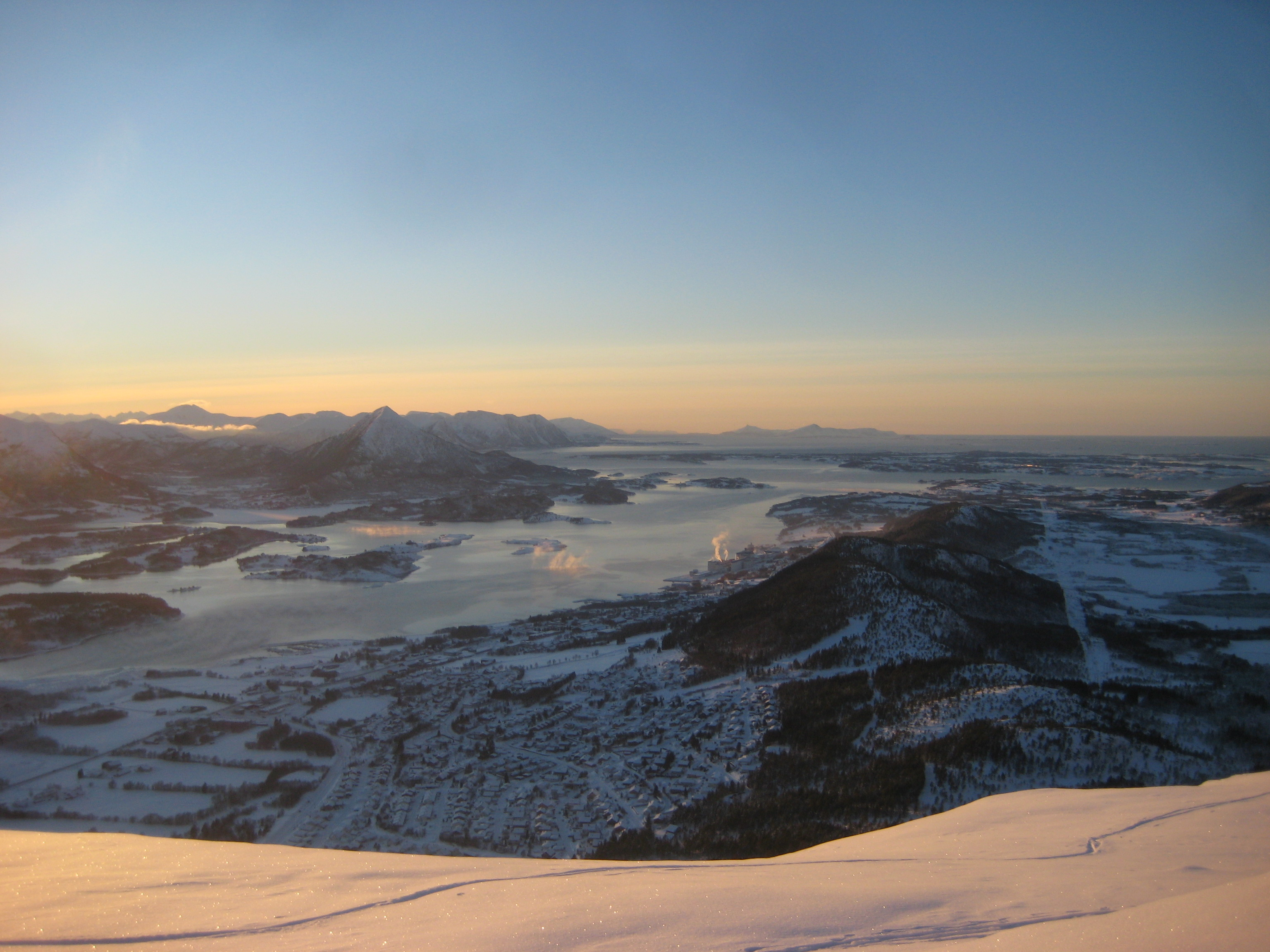
- Elnesvågen from Heiane in winter
- Interactive map of Elnesvågen
- Location within Møre og Romsdal Location within Norway
- Coordinates: 62.8543°N 7.1377°E
- Country: Norway
- Region: Western Norway
- County: Møre og Romsdal
- District: Romsdal
- Municipality: Hustadvika Municipality

Area
  - Total: 2.22 km^{2} (0.86 sq mi)
- Elevation: 38 m (125 ft)

Population (2024)
  - Total: 2,741
  - Density: 1,235/km^{2} (3,200/sq mi)
- Time zone: UTC+01:00 (CET)
  - Summer (DST): UTC+02:00 (CEST)
- Post Code: 6440 Elnesvågen

Elnesvågen is the administrative centre of Hustadvika Municipality in Møre og Romsdal county, Norway. The village is located along the Frænafjorden about 20 kilometres (12 mi) north of the town of Molde, 6 kilometres (3.7 mi) east of the village of Tornes, and 8 kilometres (5.0 mi) northwest of the villages of Malme and Sylte.

The 2.22-square-kilometre (550-acre) village has a population (2024) of 2,741 and a population density of 1,235 inhabitants per square kilometre (3,200/sq mi).

The area is predominantly an agricultural area; however, there are also several factories including Moxy Engineering (which produces trucks), the Hustadmarmor marble factory (which produces calcium products for European paper producers), and the Tine cheese factory (which is the largest producer of Jarlsberg cheese with exports to the UK, USA, Canada, Germany, and Australia).

Myrbostad Church was built in 1880 in the eastern part of Elnesvågen. A combined association football-athletics stadium was completed in 1997. The best views of Elnesvågen are from the mountains Heiane/Lågheiane and Gjendemsfjellet. Heiane is most easily accessible from Hauglia, the major residential area in Elnesvågen.
