= Sylte, Hustadvika =

Village in Hustadvika Municipality, Norway

Sylte
- Village
- Interactive map of Sylte
- Location within Møre og Romsdal Location within Norway
- Coordinates: 62.8351°N 7.2190°E
- Country: Norway
- Region: Western Norway
- County: Møre og Romsdal
- District: Romsdal
- Municipality: Hustadvika Municipality

Area
  - Total: 0.23 km^{2} (0.089 sq mi)
- Elevation: 8 m (26 ft)

Population (2024)
  - Total: 334
  - Density: 1,452/km^{2} (3,760/sq mi)
- Time zone: UTC+01:00 (CET)
  - Summer (DST): UTC+02:00 (CEST)
- Post Code: 6440 Elnesvågen

Sylte is a village along the Frænfjorden in Hustadvika Municipality in Møre og Romsdal county, Norway. The village is located at the mouth of the river Sylteelva about 2 kilometres (1.2 mi) north of the village of Malmefjorden and about 6 kilometres (3.7 mi) southeast of the village of Elnesvågen.

The 0.23-square-kilometre (57-acre) village has a population (2024) of 334 and a population density of 1,452 inhabitants per square kilometre (3,760/sq mi).
