= Vågøy Church =

Church in Møre og Romsdal, Norway

- Vågøy kyrkje
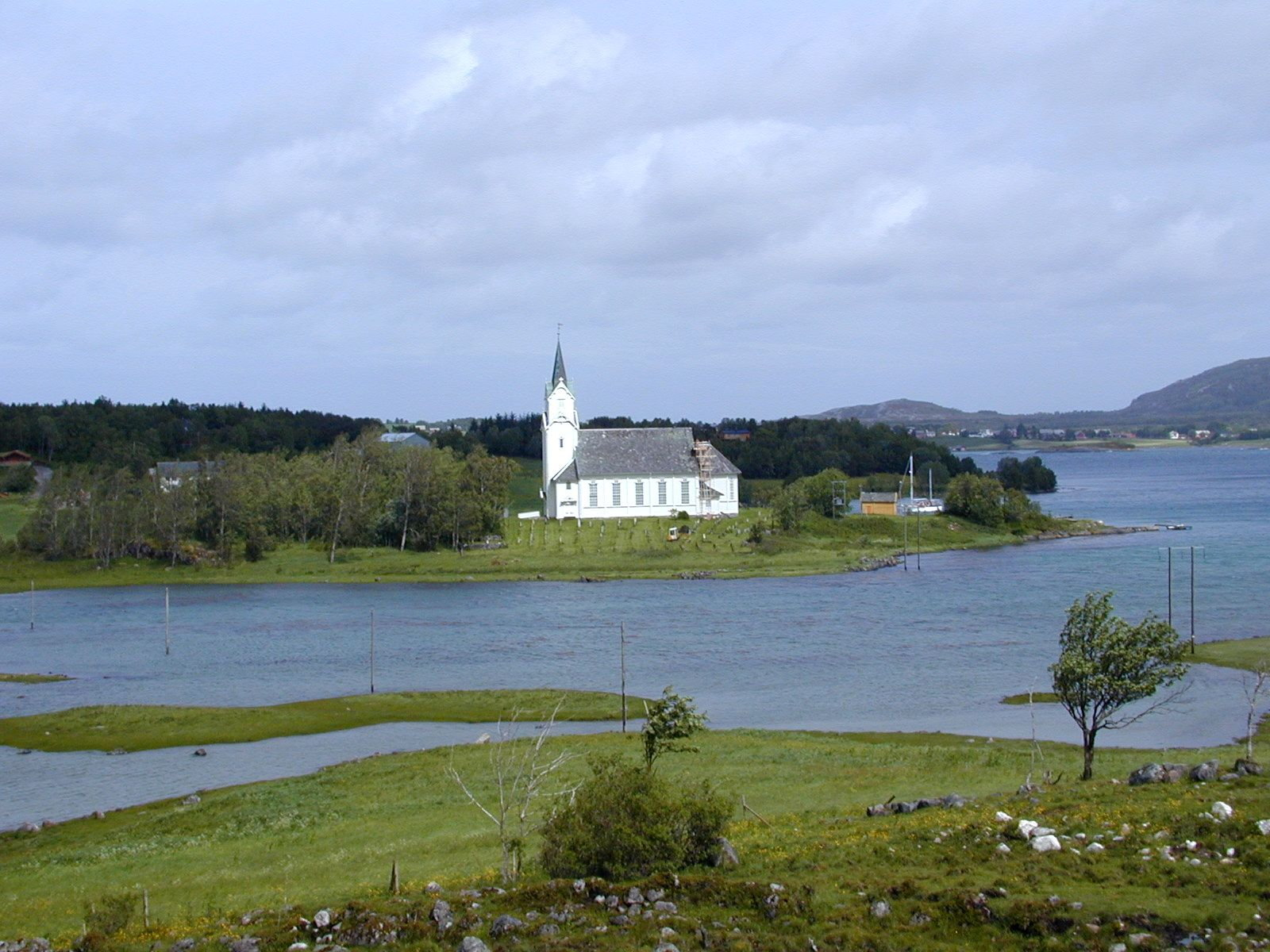
- View of the church
- Vågøy Church
- 62°49′22″N 7°01′47″E
- Location: Hustadvika Municipality, Møre og Romsdal
- Country: Norway
- Denomination: Church of Norway
- Churchmanship: Evangelical Lutheran

History
- Status: Parish church
- Founded: 13th century
- Consecrated: 1904

Architecture
- Functional status: Active
- Architect: Ole Havnæs
- Architectural type: Long church
- Completed: 1904 (122 years ago)

Specifications
- Capacity: 550
- Materials: Wood

Administration
- Diocese: Møre bispedømme
- Deanery: Molde domprosti
- Parish: Vågøy og Myrbostad
- Norwegian Cultural Heritage Site
- Type: Church
- Status: Listed
- ID: 85881

Vågøy Church (Norwegian: Vågøy kyrkje) is a parish church of the Church of Norway in Hustadvika Municipality in Møre og Romsdal county, Norway. It is located on the small island of Vågøya at the entrance to the Frænfjorden. It is one of the two churches for the Vågøy og Myrbostad parish which is part of the Molde domprosti (arch-deanery) in the Diocese of Møre. The white, wooden church was built in a long church style in 1904 using plans drawn up by the architect Ole Havnæs. The church seats about 550 people.

== History ==
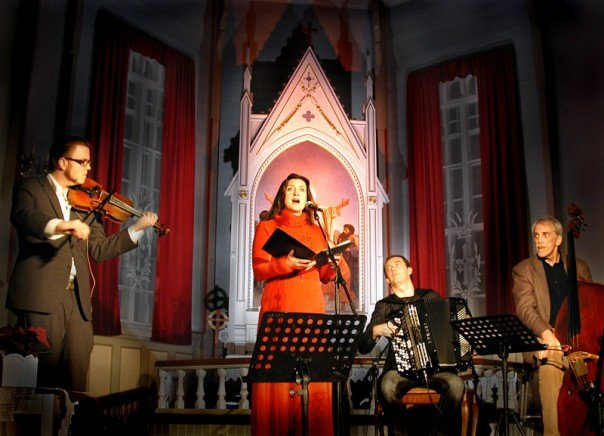
Interior of the church

The earliest existing historical records of the church date back to 1412, but the church was not new that year. The original church at Vågøy was a wooden stave church that was likely built in the 13th century. A stave church on the site was torn down in the 1660s (this may have been the original church or a second building that replaced the original building). A new, timber-framed cruciform building was completed in 1669.

In 1814, this church served as an election church (Norwegian: valgkirke). Together with more than 300 other parish churches across Norway, it was a polling station for elections to the 1814 Norwegian Constituent Assembly which wrote the Constitution of Norway. This was Norway's first national elections. Each church parish was a constituency that elected people called "electors" who later met together in each county to elect the representatives for the assembly that was to meet at Eidsvoll Manor later that year.

In 1900, the 230-year-old church burned down after being struck by lightning. After the fire, Ole Havnæs was hired to design a replacement church. The new church was built in 1904 and consecrated that fall.

== See also ==
- List of churches in Møre
