= Malme =

Village in Hustadvika Municipality, Norway

Malmefjorden Malme
- Village
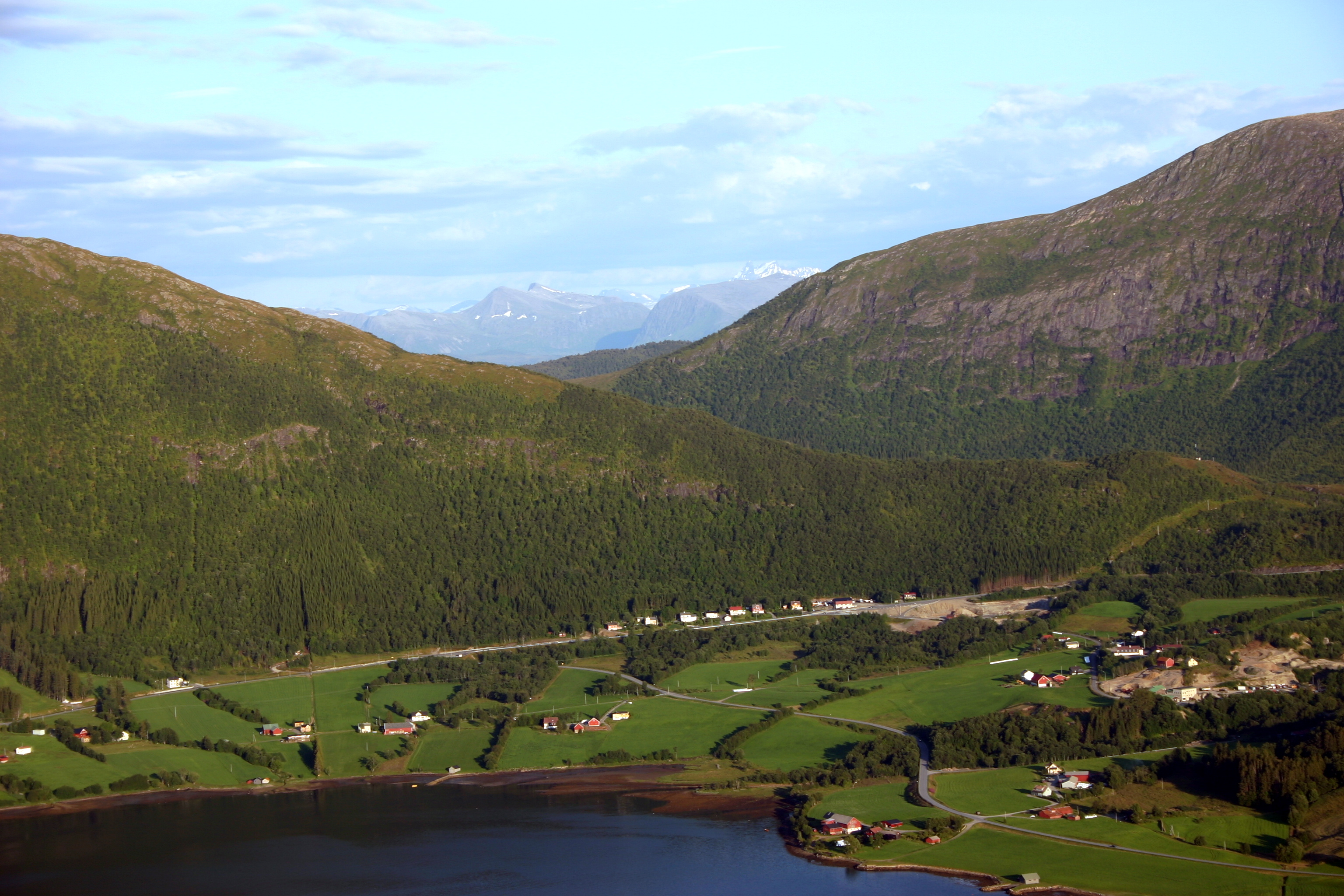
- View of Malme
- Interactive map of Malmefjorden; Malme
- Location within Møre og Romsdal Location within Norway
- Coordinates: 62.7994°N 7.2397°E
- Country: Norway
- Region: Western Norway
- County: Møre og Romsdal
- District: Romsdal
- Municipality: Hustadvika Municipality

Area
  - Total: 0.4 km^{2} (0.15 sq mi)
- Elevation: 71 m (233 ft)

Population (2024)
  - Total: 512
  - Density: 1,280/km^{2} (3,300/sq mi)
- Time zone: UTC+01:00 (CET)
  - Summer (DST): UTC+02:00 (CEST)
- Post Code: 6445 Malmefjorden

Malmefjorden or Malme is a village at the end of the Malmefjorden (an arm of the Frænfjorden) in Hustadvika Municipality in Møre og Romsdal county, Norway. The village is located 8 kilometres (5.0 mi) southeast of the municipal center of Elnesvågen and about 2 kilometres (1.2 mi) south of the village of Sylte.

The 0.4-square-kilometre (99-acre) village has a population (2024) of 512 and a population density of 1,280 inhabitants per square kilometre (3,300/sq mi).
