= Frænfjorden =

Fjord in Møre og Romsdal, Norway

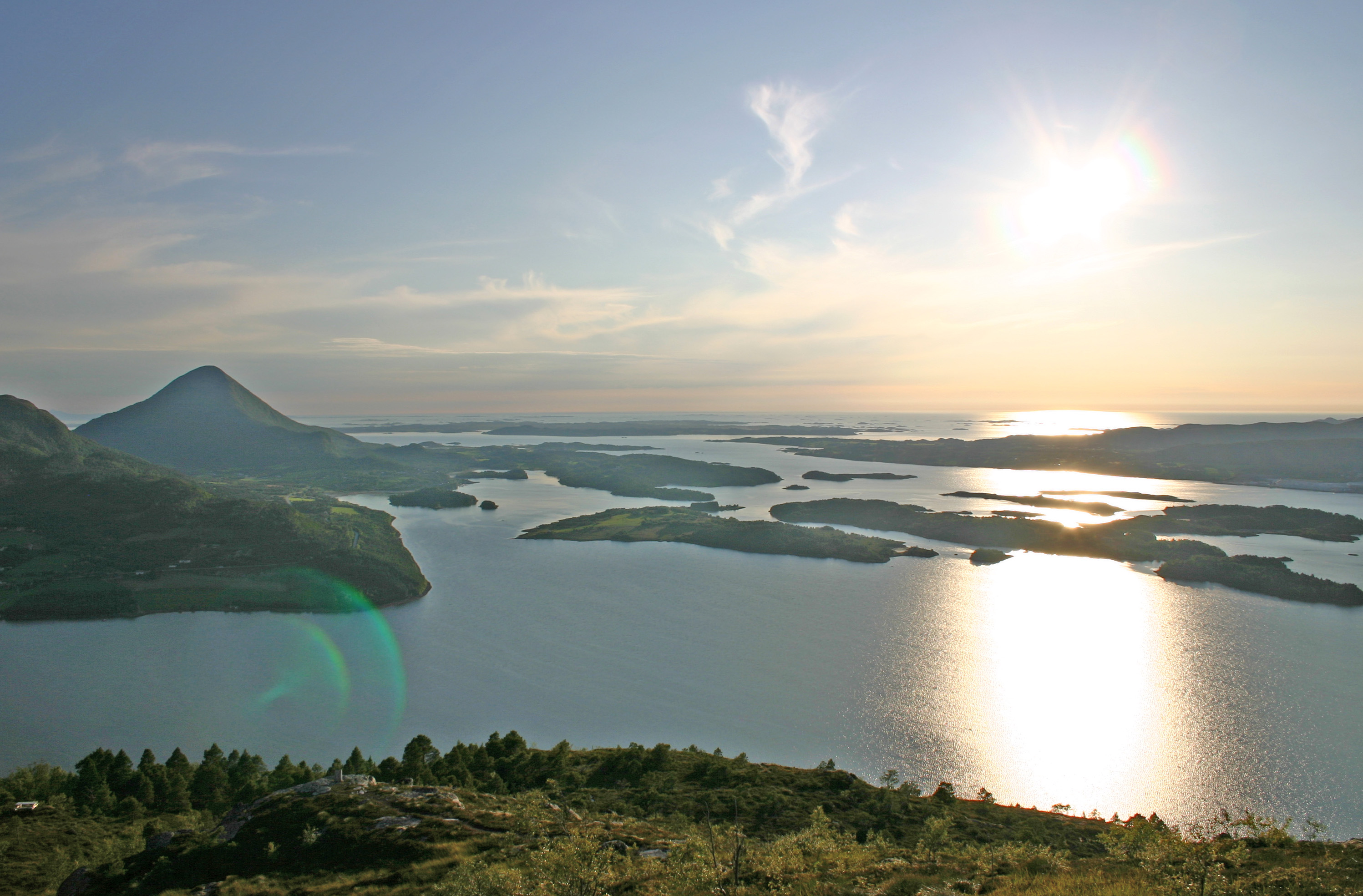
- View of the fjord
- Interactive map of the fjord
- Location: Møre og Romsdal county, Norway
- Coordinates: 62.83348°N 7.04741°E
- Type: Fjord
- Basin countries: Norway
- Max. length: 12 kilometres (7.5 mi)

Frænfjorden is a fjord in Hustadvika Municipality in Møre og Romsdal county, Norway. The approximately 12-kilometre (7.5 mi) long fjord flows from the village of Malme in the east to the Julsundet strait near the island of Gossa. The villages of Malme, Sylte, Elnesvågen, Aureosen, and Tornes are all located along the shores of the fjord. There are many small islands scattered throughout the fjord, including the island of Vågøya, where Vågøy Church is located. Other islands include Forøyna, Svinøya, and Bøyna.

== See also ==
- List of Norwegian fjords
