= St Fergus Gas Terminal =

Gas terminal in Aberdeenshire, Scotland

- Location within Scotland
- Alternative names: St Fergus

General information
- Type: Gas terminal
- Location: St Fergus, AB42 3EP
- Coordinates: 57.57062°N 1.83803°W
- Current tenants: Centrica Storage, Esso, Shell
- Completed: September 1977
- Inaugurated: May 1978
- Owner: [North Sea Midstream Partners (Since 2015)](https://nsmp-limited.com/)

Technical details
- Floor area: 220 acres (Total)

The St Fergus Gas Terminal is a large gas terminal found near St Fergus, Aberdeenshire, Scotland and is protected by the Civil Nuclear Constabulary. The other main UK gas terminals are at Bacton, Norfolk and the Easington, East Riding of Yorkshire.

== History ==
The plant was initially developed by British Gas (now National Grid) and Total Oil Marine. The three main plants have three main pipelines each coming ashore. The National Grid plant receives gas from the other main three plants. In total, St Fergus receives around 25% of the UK's gas. The land was purchased from the historical Mess family of St. Fergus

=== Total ===
The Total part of the refinery opened in September 1977 for the Frigg pipeline, with another section opening in 1978 for the Vesterled pipeline. The Queen opened this plant officially on May 9, 1978. Vesterled is owned by the Gassled partners.

=== Shell ===
The Shell plant opened in April 1982, being officially opened by Prince Charles in October 1982, taking gas from the Brent field, via the FLAGS pipeline. Gas came from the Fulmar field in July 1987, via the Fulmar Gas Pipeline, and from the Goldeneye field in October 2004.

=== Apache ===
This plant uses the SAGE pipeline from the Brae gas field. The plant also has two other main pipelines: Atlantic, Cromarty and the Britannia pipelines.

== Operation ==
The purpose of the receiving plants are to clean the delivered gas and present the Methane content to the adjacent British Gas plant.

=== National Grid ===
This is connected to the National Transmission System which transports to the rest of Scotland via Kirriemuir in Angus, then on to Bathgate in West Lothian.

=== Shell ===
This plant has a capacity of around 33 Mm SCM/d for the FLAGS line and 10 Mm SCM/d for the Fulmar Gas Line. It produces 23.25 Mm scu m/d of gas to the British Gas plant and exports 8,750 tonnes of liquid products to Mossmorran.

=== Total ===
This plant receives gas from twenty gas fields (including Alwyn, Miller, Bruce and most recently Rhum) and produces 20% of the UK's gas needs. It is the largest plant on the whole site. Until 1987, gas only came from the Frigg field, and production from this field finished in October 2004. Gas is transported to the TOTAL plant by the Frigg pipeline, which it owns. Total operates as Total E & P UK plc which is based in Aberdeen and is the fourth largest oil & gas operator in the North Sea.

=== Esso ===
There is also an adjacent plant operated by ExxonMobil. It receives its gas via the SAGE pipeline, which mostly follows the Miller pipeline, to the SAGE Terminal (Scottish Area Gas Evacuation). Esso operates at the plant as Mobil North Sea LLC.

=== Products ===
Ethane, Propane and heavier products are separated and sent onward to further plants located at Mossmorran, Fife (owned by Shell) and Cruden Bay (owned by BP). Separation is by a cryogenic process.

For the Fulmar Gas Pipeline, a gas de-sulphurisation plant is used to remove hydrogen sulphide and reduce the water content.

=== Security ===
To prevent terrorism the site is protected 24 hours a day by armed police guards

== Shell gas fields ==
=== Bittern ===
Discovered in June 1996 with production starting in April 2000. Mostly an oil field. Gas transported via the Fulmar Gas Pipeline.

=== Brent ===
Mostly an oil field. Discovered in July 1971, with production starting in November 1976. Very large gas field. Gas transported via the FLAGS pipeline.

=== Curlew D ===
Discovered in May 1990, with production starting in November 1997. Mainly an oil field, with the associated Curlew B field. Named after the Curlew bird. Gas transported via the Fulmar Gas Pipeline.

=== Fulmar ===
Named after the Fulmar bird. Discovered in December 1975, with production starting in February 1982. Gives its name to the Fulmar Gas Pipeline. Mainly an oil field. Currently operated by Repsol Sinopec.

=== Goldeneye ===
Discovered in September 1996. Unmanned platform.

=== Nelson ===
Originally operated by Enterprise Oil, and mainly an oil field. Discovered in March 1988, with production starting in February 1994. Gas transported via Kittiwake and through the Fulmar Gas Pipeline.

== Total gas fields ==
=== Alwyn North ===
Also an oil field. Discovered in October 1975, with production starting in December 1987. Gas transported via Frigg pipeline.

=== Dunbar ===
Also an oil field. Discovered November 1973, with production starting in December 1994. Gas transported via Frigg pipeline.

=== Ellon ===
Discovered in October 1973, with production starting in December 1994. Gas transported via Alwyn and the Frigg pipeline.

=== Grant ===
Discovered in August 1977 with production starting in July 1998. Gas transported via Dunbar and Alwyn and then the Frigg pipeline.

=== Nuggets ===
Discovered in July 1994. Production started in 2002. Full name is the Northern Underwater Gas Gathering Export and Treatment System.

== Apache gas fields ==
=== Beryl ===
Beryl A (alpha) was discovered in September 1972, and Beryl B (bravo) in May 1975. Production began for Beryl A in June 1976, and for Beryl B in July 1984. Gas is transported via the SAGE pipeline.

=== Skene ===
Also an oil field. Discovered in 1976, with production starting in February 2002. Also an oil field. Named after the Clan Skene. Gas transported via the SAGE pipeline.

== BP gas fields ==
=== Bruce ===
Discovered in July 1974 with production starting in August 1993. Also an oil field. Gas transported via the Frigg pipeline. Large gas field.

=== Magnus ===
Also an oil field. Discovered in July 1974, with production beginning in August 1983. Gas transported via the FLAGS and Northern Leg pipelines.

=== Miller ===
Also an oil field. Discovered March 1983, with production starting in June 1992. Gas transported eventually to Peterhead power station at Boddam via the Miller Transportation System which goes to the Total terminal. Ceased production in 2007.

== ConocoPhillips gas fields ==
=== Britannia ===
Discovered in September 1975, with production starting in August 1998. Operated by ConocoPhillips. Pipeline to SAGE Terminal at St Fergus. This field was originally licensed to Britannia Oil Company Ltd, it was formerly named Bosun after the Bosun sandstone trend. Chevron was the operator of Block 16/26 which they named Kilda, and Conoco operated the neighbouring Block 15/30 named Lapworth. They eventually realised the field encompassed all these finds and it was renamed Britannia because of its scale.

== Statoil gas fields ==
Operated by the Norwegian Statoil company.

=== Statfjord ===
Originally operated by Mobil. Discovered in February 1975, with production starting in November 1979. Gas transported by the FLAGS system, and also some to Kårstø in Norway. Also an oil field.

== Canadian Natural Resources gas fields ==
=== Kyle ===
Also an oil field. Operated by Canadian Natural Resources Limited, trading as CNR International (UK) Ltd. Discovered in August 1993, with production beginning in March 2001.

== Petro-Canada gas fields ==
=== Guillemot West & Guillemot Northwest ===
Guillemot West discovered in October 1979 and Guillemot Northwest discovered in July 1985. Production started in April 2000. Operated by Petro-Canada, although previously operated by Veba Oil. Gas transported via the Frigg system (FGL).

== Britannia Operator Ltd gas fields ==
=== Britannia ===
Owned mostly by Chevron and ConocoPhillips. Discovered in September 1975 with production starting in August 1998. Gas transported via the SAGE pipeline. Very large gas field.

== Marathon gas fields ==
Operated by Marathon Oil.

=== Beinn ===
Discovered in November 1989 with production starting in February 1994. Beinn means mountain in Gaelic. Also an oil field. Gas transported via the SAGE pipeline.

=== Brae ===
Mainly an oil field. Discovered from 1975 to 1977, with production starting in 1983 and 1988–89. Gas transported via the SAGE pipeline. Brae is also Gaelic for hill.

== Talisman gas fields ==
These fields are operated by Talisman Energy.

=== Galley ===
Discovered in October 1974 with production starting in March 1998. Also an oil field. Gas transported via the Tartan platform and the Frigg pipeline.

=== Orion ===
Discovered in September 1971 with production starting in September 1999. also an oil field, with gas transported via the Fulmar Gas Pipeline.

=== Piper ===
Discovered in January 1973 with production starting in December 1976. Mostly an oil field. Gas transported via the Frigg pipeline.

=== Tartan ===
Discovered in January 1975, with production starting in January 1981. Gas transported via the Frigg pipeline. Mainly an oil field.

== Canadian Natural Resources International (CNRi) ==
=== Strathspey ===
Originally operated by Texaco. Discovered in March 1975, with production starting in December 1993. Gas transported via the FLAGS pipeline.

== See also ==
- Easington Gas Terminal
- Bacton Gas Terminal
- Lindsey Oil Refinery (owned by Total)
