= Mossmorran =

Mossmorran Gas Plant
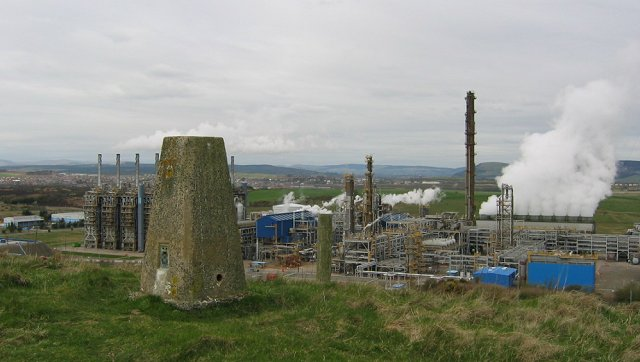
- Seen in April 2004

- Location within Fife
- Alternative names: Fife Ethylene Plant; FEP; Fife NGL

General information
- Type: Gas terminal
- Location: Mossmorran, Fife, Scotland
- Coordinates: 56.097°N 3.303°W
- Current tenants: ExxonMobil, Shell
- Completed: 1985
- Inaugurated: 1985
- Owner: ExxonMobil Chemical Limited (FEP), Shell (Fife NGL)

Technical details
- Floor area: 133 acres (0.54 km^{2})

The Mossmorran Natural Gas Liquids (NGL) plant is part of the northern North Sea Brent oil and gas field system and is located on the outskirts of Cowdenbeath, Scotland. The Mossmorran facilities comprise two plants: the Fife NGL Plant operated by Shell and the Fife Ethylene Plant operated by ExxonMobil. An associated sea-going tanker loading facility is located at Braefoot Bay, 4 miles (7 km) to the south.

== History ==
With the commissioning of the Shell Brent Field in 1976, Shell Expro and Exxon Chemicals sought permission to build processing plants at Mossmorran to process the natural gas liquids from the St Fergus gas terminal. A planning inquiry was completed in 1977. The Brent to St Fergus FLAGS pipeline was completed in 1980 and the Shell St Fergus terminal in 1981. Prior to this the associated gas from the Brent field had been flared offshore. Construction work started at Mossmorran in 1981. Shell Expro built the Fife Natural Gas Liquids (NGL) plant and the Braefoot Bay Marine Terminal, and Exxon Chemicals built the Fife Ethylene Plant adjacent to, and using feedstock from, the NGL plant, together with the ethylene jetty at Braefoot Bay. The plants were commissioned in 1985.

In addition to gas from the Brent field the FLAGS pipeline also carries gas from the Western Leg and Northern Leg Gas pipelines. The Fulmar gas line carries gas from the Central North Sea to St Fergus.

Exxon and Mobil merged to form ExxonMobil in 1999.

On 18 November 2025, ExxonMobil announced that the Fife Ethylene Plant is to close in early 2026.

In September 2026, British defence company TBG International submitted a pre-application screening request to Fife Council for the conversion of the former Fife Ethylene Plant into an energetics manufacturing facility.

The leader of Fife Council and the Mossmorran Taskforce, David Ross, outlined the "significant" benefits of the proposal. He said: "This proposal is at an early stage, but we understand it could create significant skilled employment, training and local supply chain opportunities, whilst securing productive long-term investment in this strategically important industrial site".

Energetic materials are a class of material with a high amount of stored chemical energy that can be released. They include explosives, propellants and pyrotechnics, which are key components of munitions as well as being used in the mining, construction and demolition industries.

== Structure ==
The Fife NGL plant is 3 km south-east of Cowdenbeath and covers an area of about 250 acres (100 ha). The plant comprises three parallel fractionation trains on the east side of the site. The ethylene plant is on the west side of the site and includes seven reaction furnaces with their associated chimneys, plus its own fractionation columns. The Mossmorran site overall includes about 11 product storage tanks.

The flare from the Mossmorran site is visible, day and night, from any high point in Edinburgh when significant flaring is taking place. The plants operate the following flaring equipment:

- three 80-metre-high (260 ft) flares at Shell FNGL;
- one 100-metre-high (330 ft) flare at ExxonMobil FEP;
- two ground flares which are operated by Shell FNGL but used by both sites as required.

The site is accessed east of the A909, off the south of the A92.

The Braefoot Bay site is 7 km south on the Firth of Forth. It includes six storage tanks and marine loading jetties.

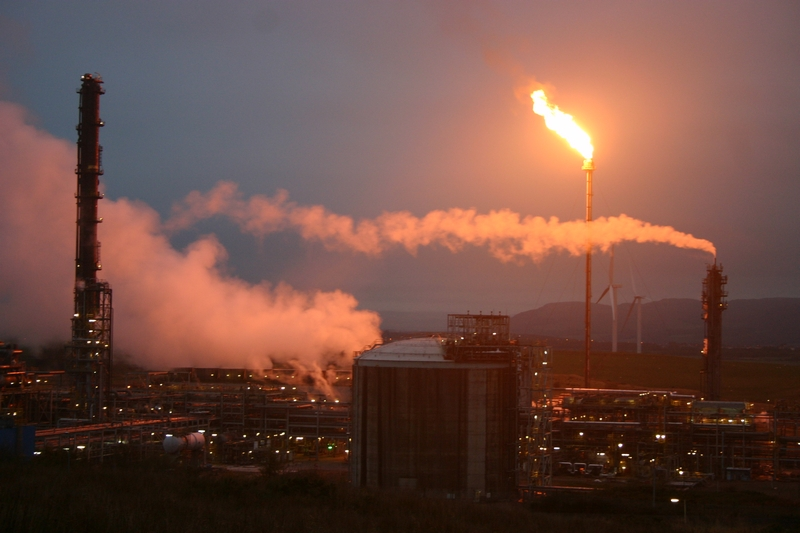
Gas flare in October 2012

== Operation ==
After gas and oil are separated on the offshore platforms, the gas is routed ashore via pipelines to the gas terminal at St Fergus. At the terminal methane is separated from the rest of the gas product. The methane is sent to a neighbouring National Grid plant which controls the gas flow into the National Transmission System. The remaining natural gas liquids are piped south via a 223 kilometres (139 mi) pipeline to the Mossmorran site in Fife. NGL from the other gas terminals at St Fergus can also be routed through the St Fergus - Mossmorran pipeline.

=== Fife NGL Plant ===
At the Fife NGL plant natural gas liquid is separated into its component parts by distillation in three sequential fractionation columns. These comprise a de-ethaniser, a de-propaniser and a de-butaniser, the constituent components and products from the plant are: ethane (C_{2}H_{6}), propane (C_{3}H_{8}), butane (C_{4}H_{10}) and pentane (C_{5}H_{12}) or natural gasoline. The ethane is piped to an adjacent ethylene (ethene) cracker plant operated by ExxonMobil for processing and cracking. The propane and butane streams are chilled, liquefied and stored on Mossmorran site within double wall insulated, partly buried tanks; the gasoline is stored in floating-roof tanks. These liquids are then transported as required via pipeline to the marine terminal at Braefoot Bay on the Firth of Forth for loading onto ships for export. Vapour return lines from Braefoot Bay are provided for the propane and butane facilities. Mossmorran has an adjacent road tanker terminal for road transportation of propane and butane.

The NGL plant originally operated using two identical process modules (each with three columns) with a capacity of approximately 10,000 tonnes per day. This was later increased to 15,000 tonnes per day by the addition of a third process module and a few other upgrades in 1992 at a cost of roughly £100 million. The production capacity in 2014 was 12,500 tonnes/day.

=== Fife Ethylene Plant ===
At the Fife Ethylene Plant ethane feedstock from the NGL plant is treated to remove carbon dioxide (CO_{2}). An amine based solution is used to 'wash' the feedstock to remove CO_{2}. Ethane is mixed with superheated steam and heated to 800-900°C in seven cracking furnaces to crack it into ethylene (ethene) (C_{2}H_{4} or H_{2}C=CH_{2}). The ethylene mixture is then cooled to 25°C in a series of heat exchangers and finally routed to a quench tower where water cascades down through the gas to remove by-products such as tar. The gas is next compressed and enters a 'cold box' comprising a further series of heat exchangers which chill the gas until it is liquefied. The liquid passes into a series of three tall fractionation towers and a reactor. In the first tower, the de-methaniser, hydrogen and methane are removed from the top and are used as fuel gas in the plant. The de-methanised product is taken from the bottom of the de-methaniser and passes to the second tower, the de-ethaniser. Ethylene, acetylene (C_{2}H_{2}) and any remaining ethane are taken from the top of the de-ethaniser and are routed to the acetylene converters where hydrogen is added to convert acetylene to ethylene in the presence of a catalyst. A mixture called C5+ (compounds containing five or more carbon atoms) is removed from the bottom of the de-ethaniser and is used as a feedstock in the chemicals industry. From the acetylene converter the mixture passes to the third column, the ethylene splitter, unreacted ethane is recycled back to the furnaces and ethylene product is pumped to the ethylene pipeline or to Braefoot Bay. About half of the ethylene is routed to the 1,000 km UKOPA ethylene pipeline network, the remainder is pumped to the Braefoot Bay Terminal where it is stored at just below its boiling point of –103°C before loading at the ethylene jetty and shipping to Antwerp. The plant was originally designed to produce 500,000 tonnes of ethylene every year; it now produces 830,000 tonnes annually.

The products stored and exported at Mossmorran are:

Products from the Mossmorran complex
Product	Purity	Vapour pressure	Storage	Export route
Propane	>95.5% volume	<14.34 barg @ 37.8°C	2 x insulated tanks, –45°C at Mossmorran	Twin pipelines Mossmorran to Braefoot Bay, 50,000–80,000 tonne tanker, LPG jetty Braefoot Bay, vapour return line
Butane	>95.5% volume	<4.83 barg @ 37.8°C	2 x insulated tanks, –5°C at Mossmorran	Twin pipelines Mossmorran to Braefoot Bay, 50,000–80,000 tonne tanker, LPG jetty Braefoot Bay, vapour return line
Natural Gasoline		<0.7 bara @ 26.7°C	2 x floating roof tanks, ambient temperature at Mossmorran	Pipeline Mossmorran to Braefoot Bay, 10,000 tonne tanker, LPG jetty Braefoot Bay
C5+			1 tank at Braefoot By	Tanker, LPG jetty Braefoot Bay
Ethylene			1 x 10,000 tonne tank, –103°C at Braefoot Bay	UK Ethylene pipeline or by 4,000–12,000 tonne tanker, Ethylene jetty Braefoot Bay

== Environmental concerns ==
Shell was fined £40,000 by the Scottish Environment Protection Agency (SEPA) after a “metering error” at the plant underestimated the amount of propane gas emitted to the environment in 2013, 2014 and 2015.

The Mossmorran Action Group was formed by local citizens 'in response to the long-term impacts residents have faced from operations at the Mossmorran Petrochemical facilities'.

A number of complaints were made about flaring during 2017 and 2018, which SEPA investigated. Complaints continued during 2019 and 2020.

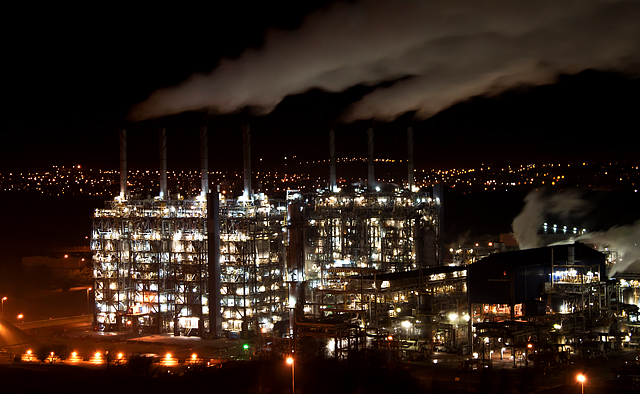
Fife Ethylene Plant at night in January 2012

In 2020, a study conducted by scientists in China found that living near a petrochemical plant can cause higher cases of major depressive disorders.

The study also linked poor sleep quality and PTSD developing in people to living near a plant in Taiwan.

As reported by the Daily Record, James Glen told his story after an environmental expert warned the public that living near these plants like the Ineos's one in Grangemouth, and ExxonMobil's plant in Mossmorran, Fife, could trigger a PTSD disorder.

Professor Andrew Watterson of Stirling University has revealed that environmental pollution, such as sound and light, can affect the mental health of locals surrounding these plants.
