= Fulmar (disambiguation) =

- A fulmar is a tubenosed seabird of the family Procellariidae/

Fulmar also may refer to:

== Aerospace ==
- Fulmar (rocket), a British rocket
- Aerovision Fulmar, a Spanish unmanned aerial vehicle
- Fairey Fulmar, a British carrier-borne fighter aircraft

== Ships ==
- Fulmar (1868), a ship that sank off the coast of Kilkee, County Clare, Ireland, in 1886
- USFS Fulmar, a United States Bureau of Fisheries research vessel in commission from 1919 to 1933–1934
- USS Fulmar, more than one United States Navy ship
- Fairey Fulmar (yacht), a 20-foot yacht built by Fairey Marine Ltd, sister class to the Fairey Atalanta

== Other uses ==
- Fulmar, a variant of the Frankish name Folmar or Folcmar.
- Fulmar Oil Field, in the North Sea off Scotland, and its Fulmar Alpha (Fulmar A) oil platform
  - Fulmar Gas Line, a natural gas pipeline which transports natural gas from the central North Sea to St Fergus, Scotland
  - Fulmar Formation, an Upper Jurassic sandstone formation which forms the reservoir within the Fulmar oilfield and other oil fields in the North Sea
- RAF Lossiemouth, a military airfield in northeast Scotland formerly known as HMS Fulmar

== See also ==
- Fulmer (disambiguation)
