= South Wales Gas Pipeline =

Gas pipeline in the United Kingdom

Coordinates: 51.965°N 2.256°W

The South Wales Gas Pipeline (also known as the Milford Haven pipeline) is the UK's largest high-pressure gas pipeline. The 197-mile (317 km) pipeline passing through Wales was built for National Grid plc and links South Hook and Dragon liquefied natural gas (LNG) terminals at Milford Haven, Pembrokeshire with the national gas network at Tirley, Gloucestershire.

The pipeline was expected to cost around £700 million, and was, according to the National Grid, expected to transport around 20% of the gas needed to meet UK consumption in future. Construction of the pipeline was estimated to take approximately three years, aiming to end in October 2007. Environmental controversy surrounded the decision to build it, especially through sections of the Brecon Beacons National Park where the National Park Authority called it a "huge blow". The pipeline was completed in November 2007.

== Planning and significance ==
Ruled a national energy security issue by the government, the pipeline's significance lies in the UK's move from being a net exporter to a net importer of energy as the North Sea oil and gas fields are used up. National Grid stated that, "The reality is that the offshore fields are decreasing in output and demand for gas from homes and businesses is growing at such a rate, that analysis shows that the UK will become increasingly dependent upon imported gas over the coming years." This depletion was predicted by Hubbert peak theory. As a result, the energy policy of the United Kingdom is likely to become an increasingly important issue and importation of liquid natural gas from the Middle East will help diversify UK energy supplies otherwise dependent on a few suppliers such as Russia.

This energy security concern accounted for the great rapidity in planning of the pipeline route, starting in 2003, as existing South Wales pipelines were too small to transport the gas needed from the planned terminals. An alternative subsea route using similar technology to the Langeled pipeline, which was being planned and built at the same time, was ruled out for expense reasons. Critics suggested that the money on the pipeline and terminals would have been better spent on renewable energy sources which would provide permanent energy security and would also have prevented global warming. National Grid claimed that the project also had significant benefits for the Welsh economy: "The pipeline means for the first time, South Wales will be at the 'front end' rather than the 'tail end' of the UK gas transmission network. At present, gas flows west into Wales from England." It also stated that the project will "secure Wales' energy supply for many years to come, and will allow further economic development in South Wales."

=== Environmental concerns ===
In Milford Haven, concerns have focused on the possibility of collision between LNG tankers and oil tankers in one of the UK's busiest ports, as well as the danger that the terminals will be a target for terrorism. A 16-mile section of the pipeline passed through part of the Brecon Beacons National Park in South Wales, despite repeated objections from the National Park Authority. The Park contains a number of environmentally sensitive areas in the UK, including numerous sites of special scientific interest, and special areas of conservation like the River Usk and its tributaries. The pipeline was allowed within the Brecon Beacons National Park as it was ruled a "critical" part of future energy needs on 7 February 2007 by the Department of Trade and Industry.

The route includes unstable areas such as Trebanos, liable to landslide and earthquake due to extensive historic mineworkings, which are deemed too dangerous for mains gas to be piped to local homes. Local people raised concerns and permission was denied in November 2006, but the pipeline was still laid in the area. As one local said: "If there was a shift or a landslip again, my fear is that the pipe would fracture, and we'd get an enormous gas leak." National Grid claimed that the pipeline would be secure. An undiscovered Roman road was found during the building of the pipeline near Brecon and was partially destroyed as a result.

=== Archaeological gains ===
The construction of the pipeline made it possible for archaeologists to study four sections of the Roman road between Llandovery and Brecon Gaer: one at Trecastle, two at Maescar, and one near Y Gaer at Aberyscir. To the north east of Y Gaer, a section of the Brecon to Kenchester route was discovered in two places. North east again, a hitherto unknown Roman road was discovered at Pipton, between Llyswen and Three Cocks, and a large Roman enclosure ditch near Hay-on-Wye. In the area north of the National Park between Brecon and Hay there were also found Bronze Age cremation sites and a post-medieval structure. Archaeologists commented that "the construction of the... pipeline provided a useful, if somewhat spatially limited... opportunity to investigate a section of countryside not often subject to modern development. The discoveries made during the project, whilst generally small in scale, help expand our knowledge of the history and prehistory of eastern Powys."

=== Protest ===
The environmental consequences of the pipeline and the perceived lack of local consultation led to considerable protest. Protests were organised by local groups along with Safe Haven Network, supported by climate change action group Rising Tide UK. Work was delayed by protest in November 2006 at Trebanos. Other protests and camps occurred at Milford Haven, Cilfrew, Alltwen, and Brecon, with locals and activists regularly disrupting work. There were strong similarities to the concerns raised by the anti-pipeline protest movement at County Mayo, Ireland organised by Shell To Sea. The tactics used were similar to those used in similar environmental direct action protests.

The opposition was also supported by a perception by local Welsh people that a pipeline like this would not be permitted in England, raising echoes of the infamous drowning of Capel Celyn for a reservoir. Local councils such as Neath Port Talbot County Borough Council were pressured to speed up planning permission. Planning decisions were pushed through, as in the case of the Cilfrew Pressure Reduction Installation which was approved only by excluding certain protesting councillors from the vote, a process deemed illegal by a high court judge saying "it is a wonder that anybody votes on anything". The result of this decision led the National Grid to declare a force majeure notice in April 2007 to avoid any responsibility for any delays in gas delivery. In June 2007 a High Court ruling meant the Brecon protest camp featuring tree houses and tunnels open since January was closed down with a number of protestors arrested and substantial local disruption to roads. In Peterstow Herefordshire, protestors forced the National Grid to choose another site that was more expensive but more environmentally friendly for their installation.

== Technical description and route ==
The pipeline is operated at a higher pressure than other gas pipelines in the UK: 94 bar (1364 psi) instead of 85 bar (1231 psi). This pressure is higher than most standard pipelines worldwide, though other such high-pressure pipelines have been successfully run in Germany, for example. It is buried 1.2 m (4 ft) underground for most of the route. National Grid replaced, levelled and cultivated the large amount of vegetation, subsoil and topsoil which had been removed to a width in places of a dual carriageway in an attempt to restore the land to its original condition. They consulted and used a wide range of environmental experts to help restore the environment.

=== Milford Haven Terminals ===
Beginning at Herbrandston, west of Milford Haven, the pipeline connects to South Hook LNG which will be the biggest LNG terminal in the world and is a joint project between QatarEnergy and ExxonMobil. It then runs to near Waterston, the site of a second, smaller terminal, Dragon LNG, which is run by a consortium in which BG Group is the major partner.

=== Milford Haven – Aberdulais section ===
Pipeline routing was planned January 2004 to March 2005; while consent and land acquisition took from March 2005 to spring 2006. Construction began on this 120 km (75 mi) section in March 2006. The pipeline diameter is 1220 mm (48 inches). It runs to Aberdulais where, at the Cilfrew Pressure Reduction Installation, pressure is reduced so that gas can flow into the existing pipeline network serving south Wales. The contractor is Nacap Land & Marine Joint Venture.

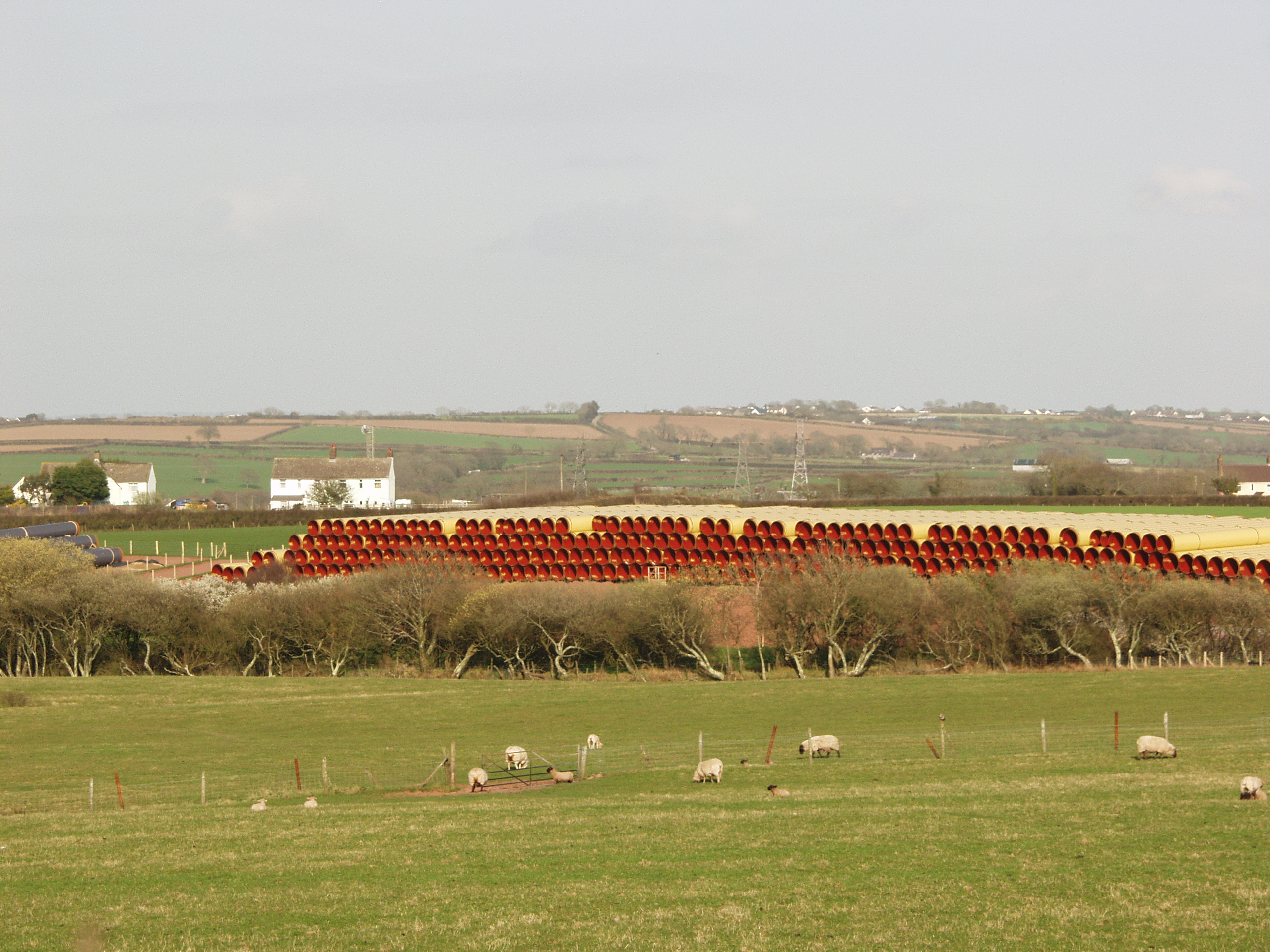
Stacked pipes at Sentry Cross

=== Felindre – Tirley section ===
Starting from a new compressor station at Felindre near Swansea the pipeline runs to Corse near Tirley, Gloucestershire, where it connects with the existing gas pipeline network. To permit the new pipeline to operate at the intended 94 bar, a Pressure Reduction Installation (PRI) is required before it joins the existing National Transmission System – the 'motorway' of gas distribution in the UK. National Grid applied to Forest of Dean District Council in 2006 for planning permission to construct a PRI at Corse but this was refused by the council and an appeal against that decision was refused by the Secretaries of State in December 2007. An application to construct a PRI on a second site, 400 metres (yards) from the first site, was lodged with Tewkesbury Borough Council in 2008 but was refused unanimously by that Council's Planning Committee on 2 February 2010. National Grid appealed against that decision.

This 122-mile (196 km) section passes through 16 miles of the Brecon Beacons National Park. Pipeline routing and environmental impact assessment took place from October 2004 to summer 2006 and consent and land acquisition took from winter 2005 to February 2007. The pipeline diameter is 1220 mm (48 inches). Construction began on this section in February 2007. The contractor for the Felindre to Brecon section was Nacap Land & Marine Joint Venture and for Brecon to Tirley section, Murphy Pipelines Ltd. The contentious nature of this section led to consultations with key statutory bodies, such as the Countryside Council for Wales, English Nature, the Brecon Beacons National Park Authority, the Environment Agency, the Welsh Assembly Government and Blaenavon World Heritage Partnership.

== Completion ==
The pipeline was completed in November 2007, which was marked by the opening of a valve at Felindre by Government Energy Minister Malcolm Wicks.
