= National Transmission System =

British gas pipeline network

The United Kingdom's National Transmission System (NTS) is the network of gas pipelines that supply gas to about forty power stations and large industrial users from natural gas terminals situated on the coast, and to gas distribution companies that supply commercial and domestic users. It covers Great Britain, i.e. England, Wales and Scotland.

== Ownership ==
The transmission network is owned by National Gas, which is owned by Macquarie Asset Management. Agreement was reached in July 2024 for Macquarie to buy National Grid’s final 20% stake, giving Macquarie full ownership in the first quarter of 2025.

The changing ownership of the NTS reflects developments and corporate changes in the UK's gas and energy industries.

- Gas Council and area boards, 1962 – 31 December 1972
- British Gas Corporation, 1 January 1973 – 24 August 1986
- British Gas plc, 24 August 1986 – 1994
- Transco plc, part of British Gas plc, 1994 – 17 February 1997
- Transco plc, part of BG plc, 17 February 1997 – 1999
- Transco plc, part of BG Group plc, 1999 – 23 October 2000
- Transco plc, part of Lattice Group plc, 23 October 2000 – 21 October 2002
- Transco plc, part of National Grid Transco plc, 21 October 2002 – 31 January 2023; renamed National Grid Gas plc on 10 October 2005
- National Grid Gas plc, owned by Macquarie, BCI and National Grid, from 31 January 2023; renamed National Gas Transmission plc on 6 February 2023

== History ==
=== Origins ===
The system originated in the construction during 1962–3 of the 200-mile (320 km) high-pressure methane pipeline from Canvey Island (on the Essex coast) to Leeds. Imported liquefied natural gas (LNG) from Algeria was turned into gas at the Canvey terminal and supplied to the pipeline, providing eight of the twelve area gas boards with access to natural gas. The gas was initially used to manufacture town gas, either as a feedstock in gas reforming processes or to enrich lean gases such as that produced by the Lurgi coal gasification process.

The pipeline was 18-inch (460 mm) in diameter and operated at 1,000 pounds per square inch (69 bar). The pipeline had 150 miles (240 km) of spur lines, supplying gas to area boards.

Methane pipeline spur lines
| Area board | Supply to | Diameter (inches) | Length (miles) |
|---|---|---|---|
| North Thames | Bromley/East Greenwich 'Tee' | 14 | 15.5 |
| North Thames | Bromley | 10 | 2.5 |
| North Thames | Slough (from Reading spur line) | | |
| South Eastern | East Greenwich | 12 | 3 |
| Southern | Reading | 8 | 49 |
| Eastern | Chelmsford | 12 | 19.9 |
| Eastern | Hitchin | 8 | 7 |
| Eastern | Dunstable | 6 | 8.5 |
| Eastern | Watford (from Reading spur line) | 12 | 2.1 |
| West Midlands | Coleshill | 14 | 10.5 |
| East Midlands | Sheffield | 12 | 10 |
| North Western | Manchester | 14 | 24 |
| North Eastern | Leeds | 12 | 8 |

The Gas Council was responsible for this £10 million co-operative scheme and the construction details were a joint effort of the distribution engineers of the area boards.

LNG had first been imported to Canvey from Louisiana in February 1959, and piped to Romford gasworks as feedstock to a reforming plant.

=== UK natural gas ===
Natural gas was discovered on the UK continental shelf in 1965 and production started in 1967. The development of offshore natural gas fields is shown in the following table. Shore terminals were built to receive, process, blend and distribute the gas.

UK sources of offshore natural gas, 1967–1985
| Field | Field type | Licensee or operator | Discovered | First gas onshore | Shore terminal |
|---|---|---|---|---|---|
| West Sole | Gas | BP | September 1965 | March 1967 | Easington |
| Leman | Gas | Shell/Esso, Amoco/Gas Council, Arpet Group, Mobil | April 1966 | August 1968 | Bacton |
| Hewett | Gas | Phillips Petroleum, Arpet group | October 1966 | July 1969 | Bacton |
| Indefatigable | Gas | Shell/Esso, Amoco/Gas Council | June 1966 | October 1971 | Bacton |
| Viking | Gas | Conoco/BNOC | May 1968 | July 1972 | Viking (Theddlethorpe) |
| Rough | Gas | Amoco/Gas Council | May 1968 | October 1975 | Easington |
| Forties | Oil + associated gas | BP | October 1970 | September 1977 | St Fergus |
| Frigg (Norway) | Gas | TotalEnergies | June 1971 | September 1977 | St Fergus |
| Frigg (UK) | Gas | TotalEnergies | May 1972 | September 1977 | St Fergus |
| Piper | Oil + associated gas | Occidental group | January 1973 | November 1978 | St Fergus |
| Tartan | Oil + associated gas | Texaco | December 1974 | January 1981 | St Fergus |
| Brent | Oil + associated gas | Shell/Esso | July 1971 | 1982 | St Fergus |
| Morecambe Bay | Gas + condensate | Hydrocarbons (GB) | September 1974 | 1985 | Barrow |

With the assured availability of natural gas, a government white paper on fuel policy in November 1967 proposed that natural gas should be immediately and more extensively exploited. The Gas Council and area boards began a ten-year programme to convert all users and appliances to operate on natural gas and consequently to discontinue the manufacture of town gas at local gasworks. In a pilot scheme, users on Canvey Island had been converted to natural gas in 1966.

=== Building the NTS ===
To exploit the availability of natural gas and to provide for more widespread distribution, construction began of a major new transmission network which became the National Transmission System.

==== Feeder pipelines – England ====
Gas from the West Sole field was first dispatched from the Easington terminal on the Yorkshire coast in July 1967, via Feeder No. 1 across the Humber to the East Midland Gas Board's gasworks at Killingholme. It was used to enrich low calorific value manufactured gas. Feeder No. 1 was extended to Totley near Sheffield where it connected to the 18-inch methane pipeline. UK natural gas first entered the NTS in July 1968.

Feeder lines from the North Sea gas terminals to the spine of the NTS were laid and brought into use as the shore terminals were constructed.

Initial feeder pipelines of the NTS
| Feeder No. | Diameter | Length | From | To | Operational |
|---|---|---|---|---|---|
| 1 | 24-inch (610 mm) | 90 miles (140 km) | Easington terminal | Scunthorpe and Totley near Sheffield, where it connected to the original methane pipeline. | July 1967/ July 1968 |
| 2 | 36-inch (910 mm) | 123 miles (198 km) | Bacton terminal | Brisley, Eye, Peterborough and Churchover near Rugby, where it connected to the original methane pipeline. | August 1968 |
| 3 | 36-inch | 107 miles (172 km) | Bacton terminal | Roudham Heath, Cambridge, Peters Green, Whitwell near Hitchin, where it connected to the original methane pipeline. | October 1969 |
| 4 | 36-inch | 154 miles (248 km) | Bacton terminal | Great Ryburgh, King's Lynn, Audley and Alrewas near Lichfield. | Autumn 1970 |
| 5 | 36-inch | | Bacton terminal | Yelverton, Diss, Stowmarket, Braintree, Chelmsford and Horndon, where it connected to the original methane pipeline | Autumn 1971 |
| 6 | 30-inch (760 mm) | 91 miles (146 km) | Paull | Pickering (see note), Westwood and Little Burden near Darlington | Autumn 1971 |
| 7 | 36-inch | | Wisbech | Gosberton, Hatton, Old Warden, Tydd St Giles and Scunthorpe | 1972 |
| 8 | 30-inch | | Former Viking (Theddlethorpe) terminal | Hatton | July 1972 |

The No. 6 feeder runs via Pickering which received gas from a treatment plant for the onshore Lockton gas field.

==== Feeder pipelines – Scotland ====
North Sea gas first reached Scotland in Spring 1970 at Coldstream via an extension of the Leeds-Newcastle pipeline. This pipeline was then extended to Glenmavis near Coatbridge Lanarkshire (Feeder No. 12) where a natural gas liquefication plant was constructed.

A major set of pipelines were constructed in Scotland in preparation for arrival of gas from the Frigg gas field in 1977. From the St Fergus terminal in Scotland, two 36-inch (910 mm) pipelines (Feeder No. 10 and No. 11) were laid via Bathgate to Partington and Bishop Auckland to connect to the NTS in England, a total pipeline length of 595 miles (958 km). These lines were commissioned in 1976 and cost £140 million. Initially they carried gas from southern England into Scotland until the Frigg field began production via St Fergus in September 1977. Compressor stations are provided at 40 miles (64 km) intervals along the pipelines. A third 36-inch pipeline from St Fergus (Feeder No. 12) was completed in 1978, and a fourth 40-inch (1,000 mm) pipeline (Feeder No. 13) in 1982.

=== Growth of the NTS ===
The NTS was extended from Leeds to Newcastle upon Tyne in early 1969. This line was extended to Coldstream in spring 1970 and then to Glenmavis, near Coatbridge, Lanarkshire.

The Wales Gas Board received natural gas supplies in 1969 through a 24-inch line from Churchover (Rugby) to Swansea via Wormington (an extension to Feeder No. 2). North Wales was also connected in 1969 via a 24-inch/18-inch pipeline from Audley Cheshire to Maelor near Wrexham (an extension to Feeder No. 4).

The South Western Gas Board received natural gas at the end of 1970 from a 24-inch/20-inch pipeline from Wormington to Exeter (Feeder No. 14).

A 30-inch/24-inch extension of Feeder No. 3 runs to the west of London via Slough to Mogador, Surrey, and was commissioned in 1970. An extension of Feeder No. 5 runs from Horndon-on-the Hill, crosses the Thames at Tilbury and runs via Shorne to connect to Mogador, completing the South London ring main which became operational in early 1972.

In addition to these distribution pipelines, in 1971 the area boards began to supply natural gas directly to major consumers. For example, a 24-inch 17 mile 'spine' pipeline was constructed to ICI Ltd at Billingham (designated as part of Feeder No. 6), and the West Midlands Gas Board laid six similar 'spine' mains into industrial districts of Birmingham and the Black Country.

Most of the NTS was built from the late 1960s to the early 1980s.

Growth of the NTS 1966–1983
| Years | NTS mileage | Operational gas terminals | Compressor stations |
|---|---|---|---|
| 1966/7 | 320 | Canvey | 0 |
| 1968/9 | 688 | Canvey Easington Bacton | 0 |
| 1970/1 | 1898 | Canvey Easington Bacton | 1 |
| 1972/3 | 2199 | Canvey Easington Bacton Theddlethorpe | 4 |
| 1974/5 | 2308 | Canvey Easington Bacton Theddlethorpe | 9 |
| 1976/7 | 2915 | Canvey Easington Bacton Theddlethorpe St. Fergus | 10 |
| 1978/9 | 3047 | Canvey Easington Bacton Theddlethorpe St. Fergus | 11 |
| 1983 | 3200 | Canvey Easington Bacton Theddlethorpe St. Fergus | 14 |

Later (post-1983) feeder mains not described above include:

NTS Feeder pipelines built after 1983
| Feeder No. | From | To | Year commissioned |
|---|---|---|---|
| 9 | Easington | East Ilsley | 1983–86 |
| 9 | Brocklesby | Stallingborough | |
| 10 | Bathgate | Glenmavis | |
| 10 | Thrunton | Saltwick | |
| 11 | Bathgate | Longtown | |
| 12 | Kirriemuir | Longtown via Bathgate | |
| 12 | St Fergus | Aberdeen | |
| 14 | Barrington | Kenn South | |
| 15 | Longtown | Warburton | 1984 |
| 16 | Barrow | Lupton | 1983 |
| 16 | Stapleford Tawney | Stanford Le Hope (near Canvey Island) | |
| 17 | Theddlethorpe | Hatton | 1988 |
| 18 | Peterborough | Cambridge (via Huntingdon and New Wimpole) | 1988–94 |
| 18 | Isle of Grain | Gravesend | 2008 |
| 18 | Matching Green | Rye House | |
| 18 | Matching Green | Tilbury | 1990 |
| 18 | St Neots | Little Barford | |
| 19 | Easington | Paull | 1991 |
| 20 | Ilchester | Choakford | 1989 |
| 21 | Mawdesley | Alrewas | 1992–2001 |
| 21 | Carnforth | Burscough | 1992 |
| 21 | Elworth | Deeside power station | 1994 |
| 22 | Goxhill and Hatton | Peterborough | 1993 |
| 23 | Churchover | Honeybourne | 1998–2001 |
| 23 | Peterstow | Gilwern | 2000 |
| 23 | Wormington | Corse | 2000 |
| 24 | St Fergus | Lochside | 2001 |
| 24 | Easington | Paull | 2010 |
| 24 | Hatton | Silk Willoughby | 2001 |
| 25 | Bridge Farm | Mickle Trafford | 2001 |
| 26 | Huntingdon | Steppingley | 2001 |
| 27 | Bacton | King's Lynn | 2003 |
| 27 | Cambridge | Matching Green | 2002 |
| 28 | Herbrandston | Corse | 2007 |
| 29 | Easington | Nether Kellett | 2006–08 |

The NTS now comprises over 7,600 km of welded steel gas pipelines. The Canvey to Leeds line is no longer part of the NTS.

=== LNG storage sites ===
In addition to the Canvey Island liquefied natural gas (LNG) import terminal, further LNG storage sites were constructed from the late 1960s. These were peak-shaving facilities used to support the NTS at times of high demand, and to ensure security of gas supplies at strategic locations. When demand was high, liquefied natural gas was pumped from storage tanks, heated in vapourisers to a gaseous state and delivered into the NTS. When demand was low, gas was withdrawn from the NTS and liquefied by cryogenic cooling to minus 162 °C to replenish the storage tanks.

NTS liquefied natural gas (LNG) sites. Gas volumes at standard conditions.
| Site | LNG storage tank capacity | Commissioned | Decommissioned | Operations |
|---|---|---|---|---|
| Canvey Island, Essex | 6 × 4,000 tonnes, 2 × 1,000 tonnes, 4 × 21,000 tonnes (underground) | 1959, 1964, 1968, 1975 | 1984 | Import of LNG from Arzew Algeria, original contract for 1 billion m^{3} (35 billion ft^{3}) per year of gas. Liquefication 205 tonnes/day, vapourisation 6 × 50 tonnes/hour. |
| Ambergate, Derbyshire | 5,000 tonnes (1 × 12,000 m^{3}) | 1967–1970 | 1985 | Import of LNG by road tanker from Canvey, output 72 million ft^{3} (2.0 million m^{3}) per day. |
| Glenmavis, Lanarkshire | 20,000 tonnes (2 × 47,800 m^{3}), | 1972, 1974 | 2012 | Liquefication 100 tonnes per day, vapourisation 250 million ft^{3} (7.1 million m^{3}) per day |
| Partington, Cheshire | 4 × 20,000 tonnes (4 × 49,800 m^{3}) | 1972 1972, 1974 | March 2012 | Liquefication 10 million ft^{3} (280 thousand m^{3}) per day, vapourisation 8 × 75 tonnes/hour |
| Dynevor Arms, (Hirwaun) Rhondda Cynon Taf | 2 × 20,000 tonnes | 1972 | March 2009 | Liquefication 10 million ft^{3} (280 thousand m^{3}) per day, vapourisation 2 × 75 tonnes/hour |
| Avonmouth, Bristol | 3 × 50,000 m^{3} | 1974–1980; 1978, 1979, 1983 | April 2016 | Short-term storage, liquefication 205 tonnes/day, vapourisation 6 × 75 tonnes/hour |
| Isle of Grain, Kent | 4 × 50,000 m^{3}, 5 × 190,000 m^{3} | 1980–2010 | Operating | Vapourisation 58 million m^{3}/day. See Grain LNG Terminal |

=== High-pressure gas storage ===
In addition to LNG storage for peak-shaving, several sites had storage facilities for high pressure gas that could be released into, and pressurised from, the NTS. The following sites were operational by 1972.

- Isle of Grain, Kent: six 'bullets', 12 ft (3.7 m) diameter, 250 ft (76 m) long, capacity 8 million cubic feet (226,000 m^{3}) of gas, operating at up to 1,000 psi (69 bar).
- Beckton gasworks, East London: eight 'bullets', 13.5 ft (4.1 m) diameter, 263 ft (80 m) long, capacity 5 million cubic feet (142,000 m^{3}) of gas, pressure cycle 350-100 psi (24–6.9 bar).
- South Western Gas Board, for Bristol and Cheltenham: eleven 'bullets', 13 ft 6 in (4.11 m) diameter, 311 ft 8 in (95.00 m) long, total capacity 13 million cubic feet (368,000 m^{3}), pressure cycle 450-40 psi (31–2.76 bar).
- Biggin Hill, Kent: seventeen, 42-inch (1.1 m) diameter buried pipes, 1,040 ft (320 m) long, capacity 10 million cubic feet (283,000 m^{3}), operating up to 1,000 psi (69 bar).

== Operation ==
The NTS is the starting point for UK gas distribution. The pipeline system serving houses is not part of the NTS, but is part of the gas distribution network of local distribution zones; the two systems combine to form the UK's gas distribution network.

The two types of gas pipelines in the UK are: large diameter high-pressure (up to 85 bar (1200 psi) and 1,050 mm (41 1/4 in) diameter) pipelines – the type that the NTS uses – and smaller diameter lower pressure pipelines that connect to users who burn gas for heat. The wall thickness of the high-pressure pipelines is up to 0.625 inches (15.9 mm).

=== Entry ===
Gas currently enters the NTS from a number of sources:

- Offshore oil and gas fields on the UK continental shelf. These deliver gas via five (formerly six) UK coastal gas terminals (five in England: CATS Teesside; Easington/Dimlington; Bacton; Rampside Barrow and the former Theddlethorpe terminal; and one in Scotland: St Fergus). Gas from the Liverpool Bay (Douglas) field formerly entered the NTS at Burton Point terminal in Cheshire; this terminal is now identified by National Grid as a NTS offtake to Connah's Quay power station.
- Onshore gas fields such as Saltfleetby, Lincolnshire (production was via the former Theddlethorpe terminal); and Wytch Farm, Dorset.
- Continental Europe. From Norway via the Langeled pipeline and the Easington terminal; from the Netherlands via the BBL pipeline; from Belgium via the Interconnector UK pipeline, both of the latter through Bacton gas terminal.
- Imported LNG. Gas is delivered from import terminals at the Isle of Grain and Milford Haven (South Hook and Dragon). The Canvey Island gas terminal ceased importing LNG in 1984.
- Storage facilities. These include a mixture of salt cavity storage, onshore LNG storage sites, and formerly the depleted onshore gas field at Rough (via Easington terminal). The onshore storage facilities are listed below. The NTS was formerly supplied by the following decommissioned LNG sites: Ambergate, Derbyshire (closed 1985); Dynevor Arms, Merthyr Tydfil (closed 2009); Glenmavis, Lanarkshire (closed 2012); Partington, Greater Manchester (closed 2012); and Avonmouth, Bristol (closed April 2016).

=== Gas specification and composition ===
The specification of gas transported within the NTS is typically within the following parameters (revised April 2023).

Specification of gas in the NTS
| Content or characteristic | Value |
|---|---|
| Gross calorific value | 37.0 – 44.5 MJ/m^{3} |
| Wobbe number* | 46.50 – 51.41 MJ/m^{3} |
| Water dewpoint | <-10 °C @ 85barg |
| Hydrocarbon dewpoint | <-2 °C |
| Hydrogen sulphide content* | ≤5 mg/m^{3} |
| Total sulphur content (including H_{2}S)* | ≤50 mg/m^{3} |
| Hydrogen content* | ≤0.1% (molar) |
| Oxygen content* | ≤1.0% (molar) pipelines ≤38 barg; ≤0.2% (molar) pipelines >38 barg |
| Carbon dioxide content | ≤2.0% (molar) |
| Nitrogen content | <5.0% (molar) |
| Total inerts | <7.0% |
| Incomplete combustion factor* | — |
| Soot index* | — |

Parameters marked * are specified in the Gas Safety (Management) Regulations 1996. As amended by the Gas Safety (Management) Regulations 2023.

The composition of natural gas in the NTS in 1979 was typically as shown below. The decline of supply from the UK continental shelf since 2000 and the sharp increase in LNG imports during the 2021 natural gas supplier crisis have made the composition more variable, though still within the calorific value limits.

Composition of natural gas, 1979
| Component | Volume % |
|---|---|
| Methane | 93.63 |
| Ethane | 3.25 |
| Propane | 0.69 |
| Butane | 0.27 |
| Other hydrocarbons | 0.20 |
| Nitrogen | 1.78 |
| Carbon dioxide | 0.13 |
| Helium | 0.05 |

=== Natural gas storage ===
Gas storage is used to manage seasonal and short-term variations in the supply and demand of gas in the UK. Facilities include salt caverns and onshore LNG storage sites (see above). Since 1985, gas has been stored offshore in the depleted Rough gas field, which initially held nine days' supply and was the UK's largest store. This facility, owned by Centrica, was closed in 2017 due to maintenance costs but about 20% of its capacity was reopened in October 2022.

The operational onshore gas storage facilities in Britain are as follows.

Onshore gas storage facilities in Britain
| Facility | Location | Coordinates | Owner | Type | Gas storage volume (10^{6} m^{3}) | Maximum injection rate (10^{6} m^{3}/d) | Maximum production rate (10^{6} m^{3}/d) | Supply duration (days) | Connection to NTS | Commissioned |
|---|---|---|---|---|---|---|---|---|---|---|
| Aldborough | Aldborough, East Yorkshire | 53°48'50"N 0°05'16"W | SSEHL / Equinor | Salt cavern | 195 | 29 | 31 | 6 | FM06 | 2009 |
| Hatfield Moor | Hatfield, Doncaster | 53°33'11"N 0°57'31"W | Scottish Power | Depleted gas reservoir | 70 | 2 | 2 | 35 | FM07 | 2000 |
| Hill Top Farm | Warmingham, Cheshire East | 53°08'48"N 2°26'45"W | EDF Energy | Salt cavern | 20 | 2 | 2 | 10 | FM15, FM21 | 2011 |
| Hill Top Farm (with extension) | Warmingham, Cheshire East | 53°08'48"N 2°26'45"W | EDF Energy | Salt cavern | 56 | 14 | 14 | 4 | FM15, FM21 | 2019 |
| Hole House Farm | Warmingham, Cheshire East | 53°08'49"N 2°26'44"W | EDF Energy | Salt cavern | 44 | | 8 | 5.5 | FM15, FM21 | 2001 (mothballed July 2018) |
| Holford | Byley, Cheshire West and Chester | 53°13'37"N 2°24'18"W | Uniper UK Ltd | Salt cavern | 200 | 22 | 22 | 15 | FM21 | 2011 |
| Hornsea / Atwick | Hornsea, East Yorkshire | 53°56'48"N 0°12'28"W | SSEHL | Salt cavern | 235 | 3 | 12 | 20 | FM06 | 1979 |
| Humbly Grove | Alton, Hampshire | 51°11'39"N 1°00'37"W | Humbly Grove Energy | Depleted gas / oil reservoir | 300 | 8 | 7 | 43 | FM07, FM09 (Barton Stacey) | 2005 |
| Stublach 1 | Northwich, Cheshire West and Chester | 53°14'03"N 2°26'04"W | Storengy | Salt cavern | 220 | 16 | 18 | 12 | FM21 | 2014 |
| Stublach 1 & 2 | Northwich, Cheshire West and Chester | 53°14'03"N 2°26'04"W | Storengy | Salt cavern | 400 | 30 | 30 | 13 | FM21 | 2019 |

The salt cavity storage facility at Hornsea, East Yorkshire comprises seven cavities at a depth of 6,000 feet (1,800 metres), which each store up to 60 million m^{3} (80 million cu. yd.) of gas at a maximum pressure of 240 bar (3500 psi). The releasable volume of gas is about half of the gross volume. During periods of low demand, gas is compressed into the cavities by electrically driven compressors and fed back onto the NTS at times of peak demand.

Salt cavern storage facilities at Stublach were created by drilling 20 in (51 cm) diameter holes through 1,000 feet (300 metres) of rock and 820 feet (250 metres) of salt. This was followed by inserting metal tubes into the holes and filling the annulus with cement to create a leak-tight seal. Water was injected into the wells to dissolve the salt and create brine which was supplied to local industry for the production of bulk chemicals, such as soda ash and chlorine. The caverns created are about 300 feet (91 metres) in diameter and 260 feet (79 metres) tall (each has a volume of 339,300 m^{3}; 443,800 cu. yd.) and are used to hold compressed gas. Stublach is the largest gas storage facility in the UK, containing up to 450 million cubic metres (590 million cubic yards) of gas.

=== Compressor stations ===
There are 25 (mostly gas turbine driven) compressor stations and over 25 pressure regulators. Gas moves through the NTS at speeds up to 25 mph (40 km/h), depending on pressures and pipeline diameters. Compressor stations generally operate at a pressure ratio of 1:1.4 – a balance between maintaining pressure and hence flow, and the capital and running cost of the compressors. It also ensures that the temperature rise across the compressors is not high enough to require after-coolers to prevent damage to the pipeline protective coatings. On the pipelines from St Fergus, compressor stations are provided at 40 miles (64 km) intervals; each compresses the gas from about 48 bar (700 psi) at 5 °C (41 °F) to 65 bar (950 psi) at 45 °C (113 °F).

Compressor stations include:

- England – Wooler, Bishop Auckland, Carnforth, Nether Kellett, Warrington, Hatton, Alrewas, Wisbech, King's Lynn, Peterborough, Churchover, Huntingdon, Cambridge, Diss, Chelmsford, Aylesbury, Lockerley and Wormington.
- Scotland – Aberdeen, Avonbridge, Kirriemuir, Moffat and St Fergus.

Initial NTS compressor stations
| Station | Gas turbines | Power rating (MW) | Commissioned |
|---|---|---|---|
| Alrewas | 2 Rolls-Royce Avons | 21.6 | 1970 |
| Peterborough | 3 Rolls-Royce Avons | 35.4 | 1972 |
| Churchover | 3 Orendas | 18.4 | 1972 |
| Scunthorpe | 2 Rolls-Royce Avons | 23.6 | 1973 |
| Chelmsford | 2 Rolls-Royce Avons | 23.0 | 1973 |
| King's Lynn | 4 Rolls-Royce Avons | 47.2 | 1973 |
| Cambridge | 2 Rolls-Royce Avons | 23.0 | 1974 |
| Bishop Auckland | 2 Orendas | 14.4 | 1974 |
| Kirriemuir | 4 Rolls-Royce Avons | 47.2 | 1977 |
| Bathgate | 4 Rolls-Royce Avons | 47.2 | 1977 |
| Diss | 3 Rolls-Royce Avons | 34.5 | 1977 |
| St Fergus I | 4 Rolls-Royce Avons | 47.2 | 1977 |
| St Fergus II | 2 Rolls-Royce Maxi Avons, 3 Rolls-Royce RB211s | 65.3 | 1978 |
| Moffat | 2 Rolls-Royce RB211s | 38.6 | 1980 |
| Wisbech | 1 Rolls-Royce RB211, 1 Rolls-Royce Maxi Avon | 32.6 | 1980 |

=== Offtakes ===
Offtakes from the NTS include those supplying industrial users, local distribution networks, storage sites and export pipelines.

- To about 71 large users such as power stations and industry, either on multi-business sites such as Billingham and Runcorn or to individual companies such as INEOS Teesside.
- To inland storage sites (see 'Entry') and formerly to the offshore Rough field storage site via the Easington gas terminal.
- To the Irish interconnectors; the 24-inch 85 miles (137 km) Scotland-Northern Ireland Pipeline (SNIP) to Ballylumford, Northern Ireland, and the two 24-inch UK-Ireland Interconnectors to Dublin, both via an NTS offtake at Moffat, Scotland.
- Gas can be exported to Belgium and the Netherlands via the Interconnector UK and the BBL pipelines, both via the Bacton terminal.
- To the Gas Distribution Network of Local Distribution Zones, as follows:

NTS Gas Distribution Network offtakes
| National Grid area | Number of LDZ offtakes |
|---|---|
| Scotland | 19 |
| Northern | 15 |
| South West | 13 |
| East Midlands | 13 |
| West Midlands | 12 |
| North West | 11 |
| East Anglia | 11 |
| North East | 9 |
| Southern | 8 |
| North Thames | 5 |
| South East | 5 |
| Wales | 3 |
| Total | 124 |

=== Gas distribution network ===
Companies that own part of this gas network, also known as the Local Transmission System (LTS), are known as gas transporters. Gas enters this network via the NTS through a pressure reduction station to the twelve gas distribution zones in Great Britain within eight distribution networks. The network covers 275,000 km (171,000 mi). The LTS is managed from Hinckley, Leicestershire (former headquarters of the NTS). Financial transactions between gas transporters are managed by Xoserve, based in Solihull, which was a department of National Grid before it became an independent company.

For retail distribution:

- Cadent owns the network in North West England, the West Midlands, the East Midlands, the East of England and North London
- in the North of England, local distribution is owned by Northern Gas Networks;
- in Wales and the West of England by Wales and West Utilities; and
- in Southern England and Scotland by SGN.

== Northern Ireland ==
Northern Ireland is not part of the NTS and obtains its gas via the Scotland-Northern Ireland pipeline (SNIP), owned by Premier Transmission and built between 1994 and 1996. The gas network in Northern Ireland is split, with one area owned by Phoenix Natural Gas and the other by Firmus Energy.

== See also ==
- Humber Gas Tunnel
- Central Area Transmission System
- United Kingdom–Ireland natural gas interconnectors
