= Vesterled =

Natural gas pipeline

Location
- Country: Norway, United Kingdom
- Direction: east–west
- Start: Frigg field, Heimdal field
- Passes through: North Sea
- To: St. Fergus, Scotland
- Runs alongside: Frigg pipeline

General information
- Type: natural gas
- Owner: Gassled
- Operator: Gassco
- Technical service provider: Total E&P UK Plc
- Construction started: 1974
- Commissioned: 1978

Technical information
- Length: 360 km (220 mi)
- Maximum discharge: 12 billion cubic meter
- Diameter: 32 in (813 mm)

Vesterled is a natural gas pipeline system, which runs from the Heimdal field (Heimdal Riser platform) in the North Sea to St Fergus Gas Plant near Peterhead in Scotland. The name Vesterled is the term used by the Vikings for their westward voyages, i.e. vesterled = "the way westward".

== History ==
Originally the Vesterled pipeline was known as the Frigg Norwegian Pipeline, which was built in 1974–1978 to transport gas from the Frigg field to the United Kingdom. It was laid in parallel to the Frigg UK Pipeline creating the Frigg Transportation System. It became operational in August 1978. As the Frigg field was running to cease production, the spur line from the Heimdal field was put in operation on 1 October 2001.

== Technical description ==
The pipeline is 360-kilometre (220 mi) long and has a diameter of 32 inches (810 mm). The Vesterled pipeline consists of two sections: a 38-kilometre (24 mi) long pipeline links the Heimdal Riser with the former Frigg Norwegian Pipeline. The capacity of Vesterled is about 12 billion cubic meters of natural gas per year. The pipeline system is owned by Gassled and operated by Gassco.
