= Folmar =

Folmar may refer to:

- Folmar of Karden (died 1189), Archbishop of Trier
- Brendan Folmar (born 1964), American football player
- Emory Folmar (1930 – 2011), mayor of Montgomery, Alabama
- Ryan Folmar (born 1974), American college baseball coach

== See also ==
- Fulmar (disambiguation)
- Folcmar (disambiguation)
