= Rough (facility) =

Natural gas storage facility under the North Sea

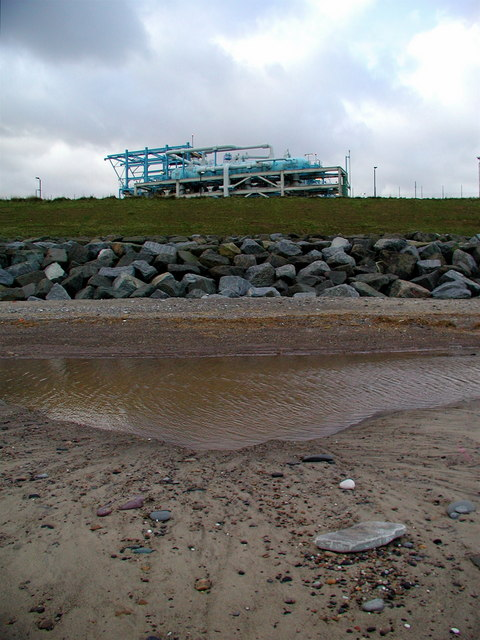
Easington gas terminal in 2007. From here the gas flow in and out of the Rough field is managed

Rough is a natural gas storage facility under the North Sea off the east coast of England. It is capable of storing 100 billion cubic feet of gas, nearly double the storage capacities in operation in Great Britain in 2021.

First opened in 1985, it was closed by Centrica Storage Ltd in 2017 because of the need for costly maintenance, the UK government declining to subsidise repairs. Centrica gained approval from safety inspectors for the facility to be brought back into service in August 2022, and it was partly reopened on 28 October 2022.

== History ==
Production licences for the Rough field were given in 1964, and gas was first brought ashore to Easington gas processing terminal in 1975. In 1980, British Gas Corporation (which became British Gas plc in 1986 following privatisation) purchased the Rough field with one-third of reserves depleted, with the intention of converting the field into a gas storage facility to manage seasonal trends in the supply and demand of gas in the UK. In 1983, British Gas Corporation made the final decision to convert Rough into a natural gas storage facility. It came into operation in 1985 as the largest gas storage facility built in the UK continental shelf, capable of storing 100 billion cubic feet of gas, nearly double Great Britain's 2021 capacity.

The break-up of British Gas plc in 1997 into BG Group and Centrica meant that BG Storage was created as a ring-fenced subsidiary of BG Group, for competition reasons. In 2001, BG Group sold BG Storage, and thus the Rough facility, to Dynegy. In 2002, Centrica bought the plant from Dynegy for £304 million during Dynegy's period of near-bankruptcy. The purchase of Rough led to the Competition Commission requesting certain undertakings being put in place because of Centrica's control of the Morecambe Bay gas fields, which at the time were providing 10–15% of the UK's gas supply. In 2003, Centrica provided DECC with a set of undertakings and Centrica Storage Ltd (a wholly owned subsidiary of Centrica plc) was formed. Centrica Storage Ltd still operates the Rough facility in accordance with the undertakings.

== Profitability ==
The facility had made a profit for its owners by exploiting the difference in gas price between summer and winter. Gas was injected for storage when its future price on the commodities futures market rose sufficiently above its current market price. That gas would be sold with a future delivery date, creating an instant profit. It was then held in the facility until the date contracted with the purchaser on which it was required to be delivered.

However, this business model became harder to operate as the global market in liquefied natural gas developed. This was one of the factors leading to Rough's closure in 2017.

Centrica have both claimed that Rough is loss making and highly profitable. In their 2024 Annual report they claimed that "The Rough gas storage facility was re-opened, at a cost of less than £10m, generating £653m operating profit between 2022 and 2024". However they have also briefed the media that "losses are unsustainable unless the Government agrees to a price-smoothing mechanism."

== Closure and partial reopening ==
In June 2017, Centrica announced the closure of the Rough gas storage site on the grounds that it was uneconomical and had reached the end of its design life.

In May 2022, the Secretary of State for Business, Energy and Industrial Strategy, Kwasi Kwarteng, began talks with the site's owners with a view to reopening the site to help ease the ongoing cost-of-living crisis in the United Kingdom. In June 2022, owners Centrica submitted an application to the North Sea Transition Authority (NSTA), the licensing authority for the UK Government, to reopen the facility. Approval was granted in July. Subsequently, Centrica indicated that they are working to restore storage operations at Rough which would depend on securing subsidies from the British government. Centrica was aiming to have some capacity available for the winter of 2022/23 against an overall plan to increase storage capacity gradually over time. On 28 October 2022, Centrica stated that 20% of the capacity of the Rough facility was available for storage, thereby increasing the total storage in the UK by about 50%.

Centrica intends to eventually convert Rough into a facility for storing hydrogen.

== Operation ==
Location of the Rough facility

The facility consists of a partially depleted gas field (the Rough field) in the Southern North Sea, approximately 18 miles (29 km) off the east coast of Yorkshire at 53.84541°N 0.36657°E. The field is divided into two complexes around two kilometres (1.2 mi) apart, referred to as Rough Alpha and Rough Bravo. Rough Alpha consists of two platforms linked by bridges and Rough Bravo consists of three bridge-linked platforms. Thirty wells have been drilled to the reservoirs for the purpose of injecting or extracting gas.

Additionally, there is an onshore gas-processing terminal at Easington, which compresses gas and transfers it offshore to the Bravo complex through a 36-inch (91 cm) pipeline. The Bravo platforms have two Rolls-Royce Avon gas turbine engines that drive compressors forcing the gas down to the reservoir, around 300 metres (980 ft) below the sea bed. As gas stored in the reservoir becomes slightly contaminated with water and hydrocarbons, the offshore platforms also have facilities for cleaning and drying the gas after extraction. The water is discharged, while the hydrocarbons are re-mixed with the gas and carried to shore in the pipeline.

When fully open, Rough had a storage capacity of 3.31 billion cubic metres, approximately 70 per cent of the UK's gas storage capacity (approximately nine days' supply). Rough could supply 10 per cent of the UK's peak gas demand and thus was an important part of the UK's gas infrastructure. Operational problems led to a partial shutdown in 2016, requiring increased imports during that winter.

The Rough processing terminal forms a part of the larger Easington Gas Terminal, which can inject upwards of 125 million cubic metres per day (approximately 40% of the daily UK supply).

The Rough facility is operated by Centrica Storage Ltd, a wholly owned subsidiary of Centrica. Nearly 200 staff and contractors were employed within the operation, both onshore and offshore.

At the time of the announcement of the rundown of the facility in June 2017, Rough was the only depleted UK offshore gas field reservoir used for gas storage and retrieval. Several projects have been proposed to use other depleted offshore fields but none has proved to be economically viable; two examples are the Baird and Deborah gas storage projects off the North Norfolk coast.

== Offshore facilities ==
The offshore installations and their details and functions were as follows.

Rough offshore installations
Installation	Platform	Function	Type	Legs	Well slots	Installed	Production start	Production to/from
Rough A Complex	Rough AD	Drilling/wellheads	Steel jacket	8	12	1975	October 1975	To Rough AP
Rough A Complex	Rough AP	Production	Steel jacket	8	–	1975 bottom	October 1975	To Easington (16" pipeline) or to Rough BP (18" pipeline)
Rough Gas Storage Complex	Rough BP	Processing and compression	Steel jacket	8	–	July 1983	April 1985	To/from Easington (36" pipeline)
Rough Gas Storage Complex	Rough BD	Drilling	Steel jacket	8	12	August 1983	1985	Into reservoir or to Rough BP
Rough Gas Storage Complex	Rough CD	Wellhead	Steel jacket	4	12	June July 1984	January 1985	Into reservoir or to Rough BP
