= Kent Refinery =

Former oil refinery in Kent, England

Kent Oil Refinery
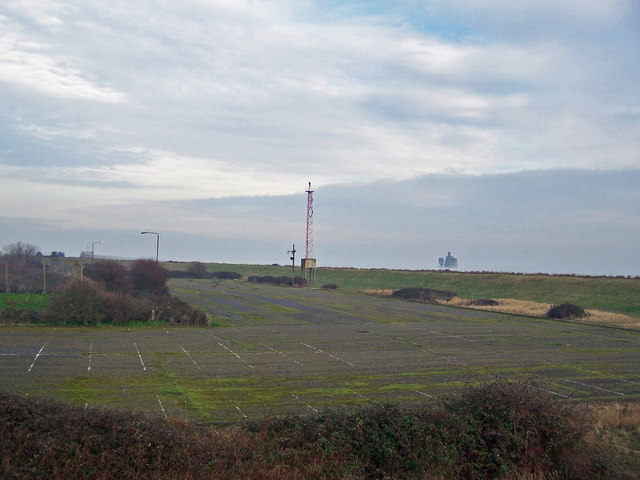
- Former site in December 2007

- Kent Oil Refinery on the Isle of Grain (Medway)
- Location: Isle of Grain, UK; 51.45°N 0.689°E

Refinery details
- Operator: BP
- Owners: Anglo-Iranian Oil Company, BP
- Opened: 1953
- Closed: 1982
- Capacity: 11 million tonnes per year
- No. of employees: 1,500

The BP Refinery (Kent) was an oil refinery on the Isle of Grain in Kent. It was commissioned in 1953 and had a maximum processing capacity of eleven million tonnes (eleven million long tons; twelve million short tons) of crude oil per year. It was decommissioned in August 1982.

== History ==
=== Background ===
The oil industry was first established on the Isle of Grain in 1908 when, in association with the naval dockyard at Sheerness, the Admiralty constructed an oil storage and ship refuelling depot on the Medway. In 1923 the Medway Oil and Storage Company (MOSCO) constructed an oil refinery and tank farm adjacent to the Admiralty site. MOSCO was absorbed into the Anglo-Persian Oil Company (APOC) in 1932 after which oil refining at Grain ceased. (APOC was renamed the Anglo-Iranian Oil Company in 1935, then British Petroleum Company in 1954).

Further up the Medway at Kingsnorth, Berry Wiggins and Company started constructing an oil refinery and tank farm in 1930. This refinery was expanded both before and after the Second World War, and finally closed in 1977.

In 1943 a spur pipeline (T/D/G) was constructed to the Isle of Grain from off the Thames to Dungeness pipeline (T/D) which fuelled DUMBO, part of Operation Pluto. The spur line to Grain provided access to the Admiralty oil storage facility.

The BP Refinery (Kent) was one of several oil refineries – including Esso Fawley on Southampton Water – which were built in the post-war period for the production of refined petroleum products. These realised the UK government's strategy to save dollars by encouraging the refining of Middle Eastern crude oil, and to keep within the UK the added value of such refined products.

The post-war refineries changed Britain's coastal geography: they required large amounts of land and were built in previously rural coastal areas. The refineries also provided feed-stock for the land-hungry and intrusive petrochemical industry often built adjacent to refineries. There was a tension between these rural developments and the government policy of supporting industrial development in urban areas where there was high unemployment. Despite reservations about these developments, the UK government approved the Kent and Fawley refinery plans in 1947, although the developments took some years to be built.

=== Construction ===
The Anglo-Iranian Oil Company commenced the construction of the Kent Refinery, unofficially known as the Grain Refinery, in 1950. The contracts were managed by the Badger Company, with construction carried out by McAlpine and Wimpey.

Pre-construction groundworks were carried out on the southern part of the site, including the infilling of several disused watercourses, namely Wells Fleet, Littlechalk Fleet, and most of Greatchalk Fleet. This work involved the use of one million cubic yards (765,000 m³) of soil, sourced from higher ground to the north of the site. To the south-east of the site, the ground level was raised by up to six feet (1.8 m) using compacted sand dredged from the seabed.

Six thousand concrete piles were driven to provide foundations for the major plant and equipment on the marshy ground.

A bay on the Saltpan Reach of the River Medway was enclosed to serve as a storage reservoir for cooling water, filled by the incoming tide. A water channel, three-quarters of a mile (1.2 km) in length (TQ865739 to TQ868749) was constructed to convey water from the reservoir across the site to the refinery pump house, from where it could be distributed around the site for process cooling. The channel had a volumetric capacity of 16 million gallons (73,000 m^{3}). The refinery's cooling water circulation system had a capacity of 3.5 million gallons/hour (15,900 m^{3}/hour).

Initially, five new jetties were constructed on the River Medway, with the capacity to accommodate vessels of up to 32,000 tonnes. A deep-water channel was dredged to enable ships to reach the jetties from the Thames Estuary. This channel, which extended for 4 miles (6.4 km) and was 800 feet (240 m) wide, was excavated to provide a minimum water depth of 28 feet (8.5 m) at low tide.

The initial phase of construction entailed the use of:

- 37,000 tonnes of concrete
- 119,000 tonnes of steel
- 14 million bricks
- 600 miles (970 km) of piping

At its peak the construction activity on the site employed 8,000 workers; 1,500 were housed in a construction camp at Wallend in the centre of the site.

In 1952 the Thames to Grain (T/G) pipeline was recommissioned to carry refined fuel from the BP Kent refinery to the Walton storage depot. The movement of fuel was now in the opposite direction to that originally designed. This led to the need to install new pumping units and to construct a new pump-station at Stoke (TQ851757), located close to the Isle of Grain refinery.

The first phase of construction cost around £40m.

== Production ==
The first tanker containing 27,000 tonnes of crude oil from the Middle East arrived at the refinery in October 1952.

The initial phase of the refinery was commissioned in several stages:

- Stage 1 – the No. 1 crude distillation unit plus the product sweetening and blending plants, in February 1953.
- Stage 2 – the catalytic cracking unit, and the SO_{2} plant for kerosene, in October 1953.
- Stage 3 – the lubricating oils facility, in Summer 1954.
- Stage 4 – No. 1 catalytic reformer, in Spring 1955.

The East Coast floods of January 1953 inundated the refinery site, covering it in water and mud. The flood displaced some of the pipes on the pipe tracks. Nevertheless, the refinery went on-stream three weeks later in February 1953.

The refinery had an initial throughput capacity of four million tonnes per year of crude oil. Crude oil mainly came from the Middle East with smaller amounts from Libya, Nigeria and South America.

On 5 April 1955, the site was visited by the Queen and the Duke of Edinburgh.

Following the initial phase of commissioning the refining capacity was increased and new processes were planned, constructed and commissioned over the period 1956–60. A desulphurising plant was commissioned in Autumn 1957. The H_{2}S absorption towers, hydrofiner, and sulphur recovery plants were commissioned in Autumn 1957. The No. 2 Crude oil distillation unit and stabilisers were commissioned at the end of 1957.

The availability of suitable feed-stock on the site lead to the construction of several facilities adjacent to the refinery. The South Eastern Gas Board SEGAS constructed a gas-from-oil plant in 1957. The gasification plant had a projected capacity of 80 million cubic feet, gas mains were laid from the Isle of Grain to Strood to feed gas into a trunk main system to provide gas south of the Thames from Sittingbourne in the east to as far as Guildford in the west. A petrochemical plant to manufacture synthetic fibres, a joint venture by BP and California Chemicals known as BP-California Ltd, was planned and constructed from 1960.

=== Process units ===
The principal processing units and plant installed by 1961 included:

- No. 1 and No. 2 Crude distillation units (CDU). Crude oil passed to the short primary columns where rich gas and primary flash distillate (PFD) were removed. The bottom product was heated to 600 °F (316 °C) and passed to the secondary columns comprising 36 bubble trays where fractionation took place. The products were kerosene; naphtha; light gas oil; heavy gas oil; and atmospheric residue. The two units had a combined capacity of 200,000 barrels or 7 million gallons per day of crude oil.
- No. 1 and No. 2 primary flash distillate (PFD) stabilisers. These took their feed from CDU primary columns and comprised two columns, the debutaniser and depropaniser. These produced propane, butane and petrol. Petrol was used by the South Eastern Gas Board or was fed to the thermal reformer or the catalytic reformers.
- Vacuum distillation units. There were three of these, which enabled distillation of products insufficiently volatile to be distilled at atmospheric pressure. They were fed with atmospheric residue from the crude distillation units. These produced gas oil, cat-cracker feed and lubricating oils (after further treatment). The vacuum residue was sent to the Propane Deasphalting Unit to provide the feedstock for heavy lubricants.
- Thermal reformer. This produced gas; butenes; and thermal reformate.
- Catalytic cracker. Took feed-stock from the CDU or vacuum distillation units, or slack wax from the MEK dewaxing unit, and converted it to lighter molecular weight products valuable for petrol blending. It used powdered clay as a catalyst under an atmosphere of superheated steam. It broke large saturated hydrocarbon molecules into smaller unsaturated molecules. It produced butene; light petrol; heavy petrol; heavy gas oil; light gas oil; and vapourising oil, plus decanted oil, which was carcinogenic. The cracking process deposited carbon on the catalyst. The spent catalyst was blown with air into the large green regenerator where the carbon was burned off. The regenorator was one of the most striking features of the refinery, with its roaring smoke plume.
- Catalytic reformers. These were fed with paraffinic petrol8PMV+36 Sittingbourne benzine or naphtha and, used a platinum catalyst and hydrogen to produce propane, butane, and platformates for product blending. The liquid products were aromatic hydrocarbons, providing high octane motor spirit components.
- The C_{3}/C_{4} (Propane/Butane) splitter. A tall narrow column, fed with product from the catalytic reformers, separated propane and butane.
- Alkylation unit. This reacted isobutane with butenes, collected from across the refinery processes, in the presence of a sulphuric acid catalyst. Produced gas; butane; aviation alkylate; and heavy alkylate.
- Hydrofiner units. Treated light gas oil to remove sulphur and produce diesel oil and wild petrol. They used cobalt molybdate catylist and hydrogen. The refinery was able to make low sulphur Diesel oil for urban use.
- SO_{2} extraction plant. Kerosene was separated into paraffin and vaporising oil using liquefied sulphur dioxide. Without such treatment kerosene burned with a smoky flame.
- Isopentane unit. Recovered isopentane from petrol using a 73 ripple tray column. Isopentane was refined in an acid washery before blending into aviation fuel.
- Udex extraction plant. Treated motor spirit through fractionation and a solvent.
- Propane deasphalting unit. Was fed with vacuum residue which was dissolved in liquefied propane to remove pitch.
- Furfural unit. Improved the viscosity index and oxidation stability of lubricating oils using a solvent made by steam distillation of wheat husks.
- MEK (methyl-ethyl-ketone) dewaxing unit. A stage in the lubricating oil plant to dewax oils. The wax was frozen out from the oil in the solvent to produce slack wax. This was used as cracker feedstock.
- Clay treatment unit. Fuller's earth was used to remove impurities from lubricating oils. This was replaced in about 1963 by a Ferrofiner hydrogenation unit.
- Sulphur recovery plant
- Acid recovery plant
- The plant also comprised tankage and storage units, product blending, packaging and dispatch facilities.

By 1961 the cost of the refinery was £88 million.

Intermediate products from the refinery processes included: straight run blending components; isopentane; propane; butane; aviation alkylate; heavy alkylate; thermal reformate; aviation extract; Udex raffinate; aviation platformate; total platformate; heavy platformate; aviation fuel (ATG); acid washed kero; sweetened kero; kero raffinate; kero extract; light cat-cracker spirit; heavy cat-cracker spirit desulphurised gas oil; straight run gas oil; fuel oil blending components; extracts, lubricating oils.

In 1962 a third £3.5m catalytic reformer was built together with a £5m aromatics plant. The main products of this plant were ortho and para xylene. The para xylene was for the preparation of terephthalic acid, an intermediate in the production of terylene. Three tall distillation columns of the orthoxylene unit, part of the aromatics plant, were constructed in 1962. By 1964 the capacity of the refinery had increased to 9.5 million tonnes per year; it was the second largest refinery in the UK, second only to Fawley (11,500 tonnes per year). Kent refinery processed about fourteen per cent of the UK's oil. By 1971 it was capable of processing 11 million tonnes. The refinery began to process British North Sea crude oil from June 1975, this was with the arrival of the tanker Theogennitor with crude from the Argyll oil field.

The refinery provided local employment opportunities; prior to its construction many people were working on farms at very low wages.

=== Products ===
The principal products from the refinery were:

- Liquefied butane
- Motor spirit
- Aviation spirit
- Aviation kerosene
- Burning oil
- Gas oil
- Fuel oil
- Lubricating oils

== Closure ==
The rising price of oil in the 1970s resulted in a slump in consumption, which meant there was a considerable excess of refining capacity throughout Europe. In August 1981 BP Oil announced that the BP Kent refinery would close in 1982 with the loss of 1,670 workers plus another 1,000 construction jobs in the area. The Kent refinery closed on 27 August 1982. The oil storage facility continued for some years; the last oil flow by rail from Grain ran in 1999. After closure some of the western part of the site was developed by British Gas as a liquefied natural gas plant Grain LNG Terminal and some as London Thamesport container terminal.

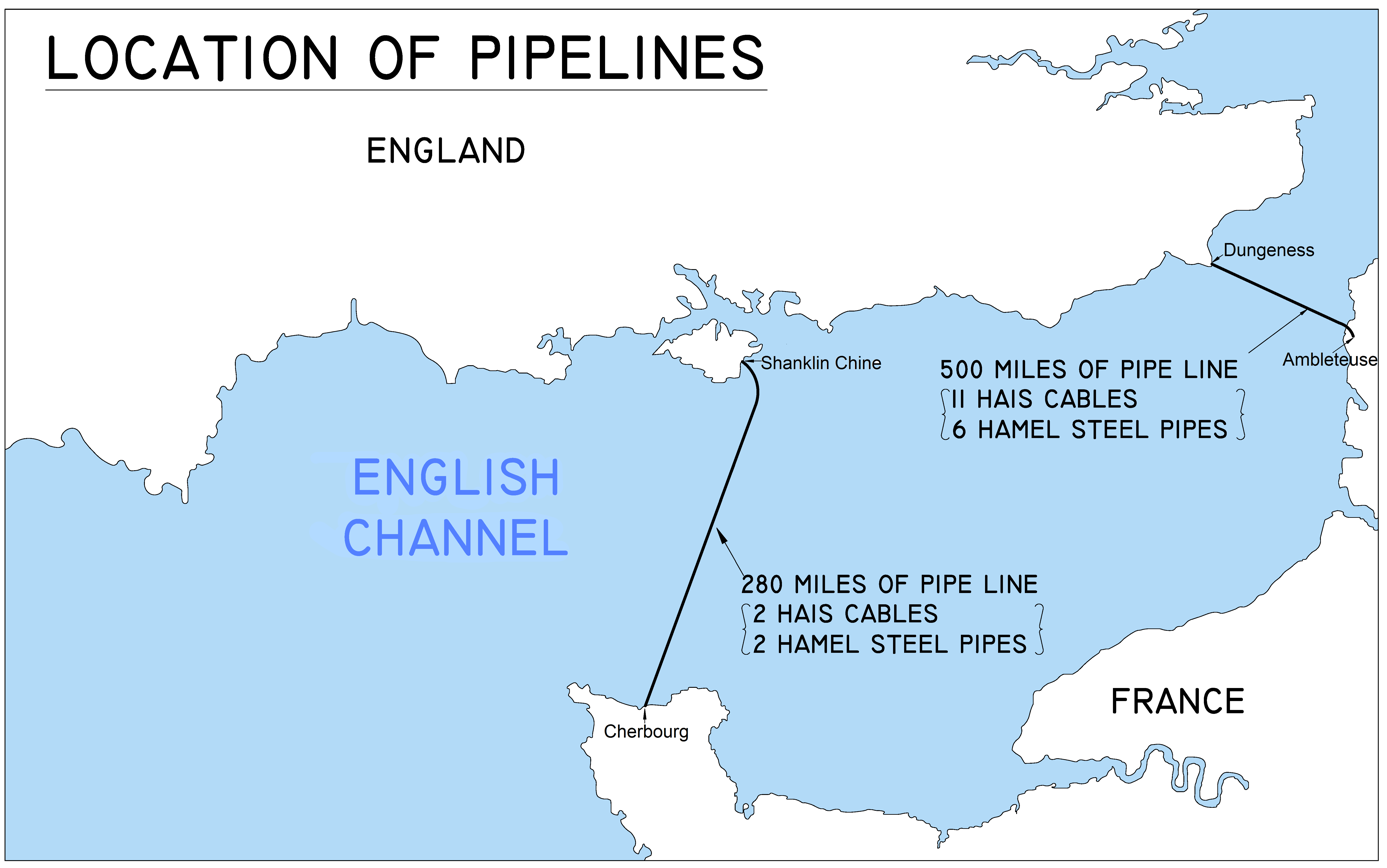
DUMBO pipeline in 1944

== Structure ==
At its maximum extent the refinery and its tank farm covered a site of four square kilometres (400 hectares). The western boundary of the site was defined by the Yantlet Creek.

The main structures on the site included:

- a large administration office building.
- 22 miles (35 km) of roads within the refinery and tank farm complex.
- four rail sidings where refined oil products were loaded into rail tanks through overhead gantries and piping. The rail loading facility was towards the end of the Hoo to Grain branch of the North Kent railway.
- nine jetties to take large oil tankers and three smaller jetties.
- the crude distillation column was 140 feet (43 m) high.
- liquefied Petroleum Gases (LPG) were stored in Horton spheres.
- the crude oil tankage was to the north east of the site.
- the fuel oil and products tankage was to the south of the site.
- some of the motor spirit tankage was underground to the north east of the site.

The oil-fired Grain Power Station was constructed adjacent to the refinery in the late 1970s to use fuel oil from the refinery.

The refinery was accessed by road via the A228 and B2001.

== See also ==
- Historic England Archive
- Fawley Refinery
- British Petroleum
