= Frigg gas field =

Natural gas field in the North Sea

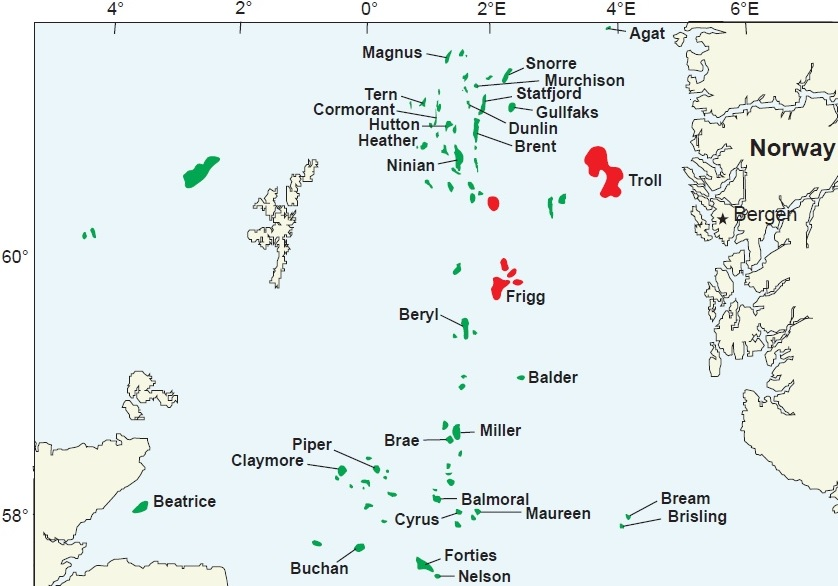
- North Sea oil and gas fields

- Location within North Sea
- Country: Norway
- Region: North Sea
- Location/block: 25/1
- Offshore/onshore: Offshore
- Coordinates: 59°52′48.48″N 2°3′59.40″E
- Operator: Total S.A.

Field history
- Discovery: 1971
- Start of production: 8 May 1978
- Abandonment: 26 October 2004

Production
- Estimated gas in place: 6,780×10^{9} cu ft (192×10^{9} m^{3})

Frigg gas field is a natural gas field on Norwegian block 25/1 in the North Sea, on the boundary between the United Kingdom and Norway. The field is named after the goddess Frigg. King Olav V of Norway officially opened production on 8 May 1978. Production was closed on 26 October 2004. The field is situated 230 kilometres (140 mi) northwest of Stavanger. Operator for the field was the French oil company Elf Aquitaine, which merged and changed name to Total S.A.

Operations were regulated according to an agreement between the UK and Norwegian governments called the Frigg Treaty.

Infrastructural changes were made in three phases:

- Phase I - 1977
- Phase II - 1978
- Phase III - 1981

== Geology ==
The field was discovered at a depth of 1,850 metres (6,070 ft) by the Petronord group (Elf Aquitaine, Total Oil Marine Norsk, and Norsk Hydro) and the Norwegian State in 1971 with Well 25/1-1 using the Semi-submersible Neptune P 81 in 100 metres (330 ft) of water. The well was located following interpretation of a 15 by 20 km grid of Reflection seismology lines recorded in 1965. A 5 by 5 km finer grid of seismic lines were recorded in 1969, followed by a 1 by 1 km grid in 1973, which, combined with four appraisal wells, determined the field was 115 square kilometres (44 sq mi) in area with a 170-metre (560 ft) gas column in Lower Eocene sandstones forming an abyssal fan in the Viking Structural basin. The fan structure appears on seismic sections as a low relief Anticline that includes a Flat spot caused by the Density contrast of the gas.

== Development ==
The Frigg field has been developed through a number of offshore platforms.

Frigg installations
Platform	Coordinates	Function	Type	Legs	Well slots	Installed	Production start	Production to
Frigg DP1	59°52’40”N 02°04’48”E	Drilling platform	Steel jacket	8	?	October 1974 buoyancy tanks collapsed damaged beyond recovery	–	–
Frigg CDP1	59°52’31”N 02°03’42”E	Drilling, production	Concrete gravity	1	24	September 1975	September 1977	TP1
Frigg TP1	59°52’47”N 02°03’51”E	Treatment	Concrete gravity	2	–	June 1976	September 1977	MCP01
Frigg QP	59°52’42”N 02°03’54”E	Quarters platform	Steel jacket	4	–	July 1975	–	–
Frigg DP2	59°53’10”N 02°04’21”E	Drilling, production	Steel jacket	8	24	May 1976	August 1978	TCP2
Frigg TCP2	59°52’48”N 02°04’01”E	Treatment, compression	Concrete gravity	3	–	June 1977	August 1978	MCP01, DP2
Frigg MCP-01	58°49’39”N 00°17’12”E	Manifold, compression	Concrete gravity	1	–	June 1976	September 1977	St Fergus
Frigg flare platform FP	59°52’54”N 02°03’21”E	Flare	Articulated steel	1	–	October 1975	December 1977	From TP1
Frigg NE	59°59’07”N 02°14’52”E	Field control station	Steel tower, concrete base		6 subsea trees	June 1981	December 1983	TCP2

Initial production of gas (in 1000 standard cubic metres)

== Pipelines ==
Pipelines associated with the Frigg field are as follows:

Frigg field pipelines
Start	Terminal	Length	Diameter	Type
TP1 / TCP2	MCP-01	2 × 186 km	32”	Gas
MCP-01	St Fergus	2 × 174 km	32”	Gas
CDP1	TP1	2 × 500 m	26”	Gas
CDP1	TP1	500 m	4”	Condensate
TP1	CDP1	500 m	8”	Kill
DP2	TCP2	2 × 700 m	26”	Gas
DP2	TCP2	700 m	4”	Condensate
TCP2	DP2	700 m	8”	Kill
TP1	FP	500 m	24”	Gas
TP1	FP	500 m	–	Gas air pilot
Subsea template	TCP2	18 km	16”	Gas
TCP2	NEF	18 km	1.25”	Methanol
FCS	Template	500 feet	2”	Kill

=== Pipelines connected to the Frigg field ===
- Frigg UK System - natural gas transportation system from the Alwyn North Field in the North Sea via the Frigg field to St. Fergus near Peterhead in Scotland. The Frigg UK System is operated by Total E&P UK Plc.
- Vesterled - mostly the former Frigg Norwegian Pipeline.
- Gas production from the Odin gas field was transported to Frigg TCP2 by a 26 km 20-inch pipeline.

== Images ==
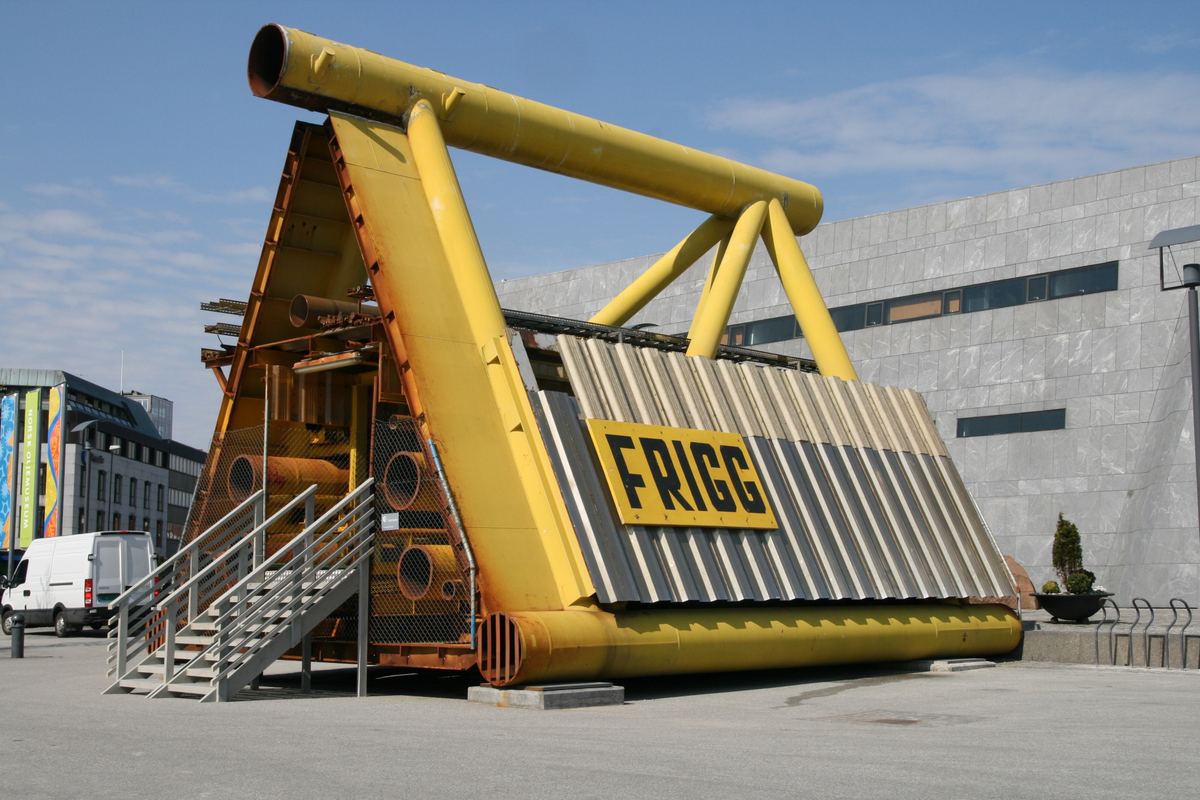
Bridge from the Frigg field outside the Norwegian Petroleum Museum in Stavanger

== Future plans ==
The Frigg field may be revitalised. A production licence on the Norwegian side of Frigg was allocated to Equinor in 2016. An appraisal well was drilled on Frigg in 2019. Equinor also holds the licence rights on the UK side of the field.

== Bibliography ==
- Heritier, F E; Lossel, P; Wathne, E (1980). "Frigg Field-Large Submarine-Fan Trap in Lower Eocene Rocks of the Viking Graben, North Sea". In Halbouty, Michel Thomas (ed.). Giant Oil and Gas Fields of the Decade:1968–1978. AAPG Memoir 30. Tulsa: American Association of Petroleum Geologists. ISBN 0891813063. OCLC 7355859.
