= Grain LNG Terminal =

LNG terminal in the United Kingdom

Coordinates: 51.45°N 0.68°E

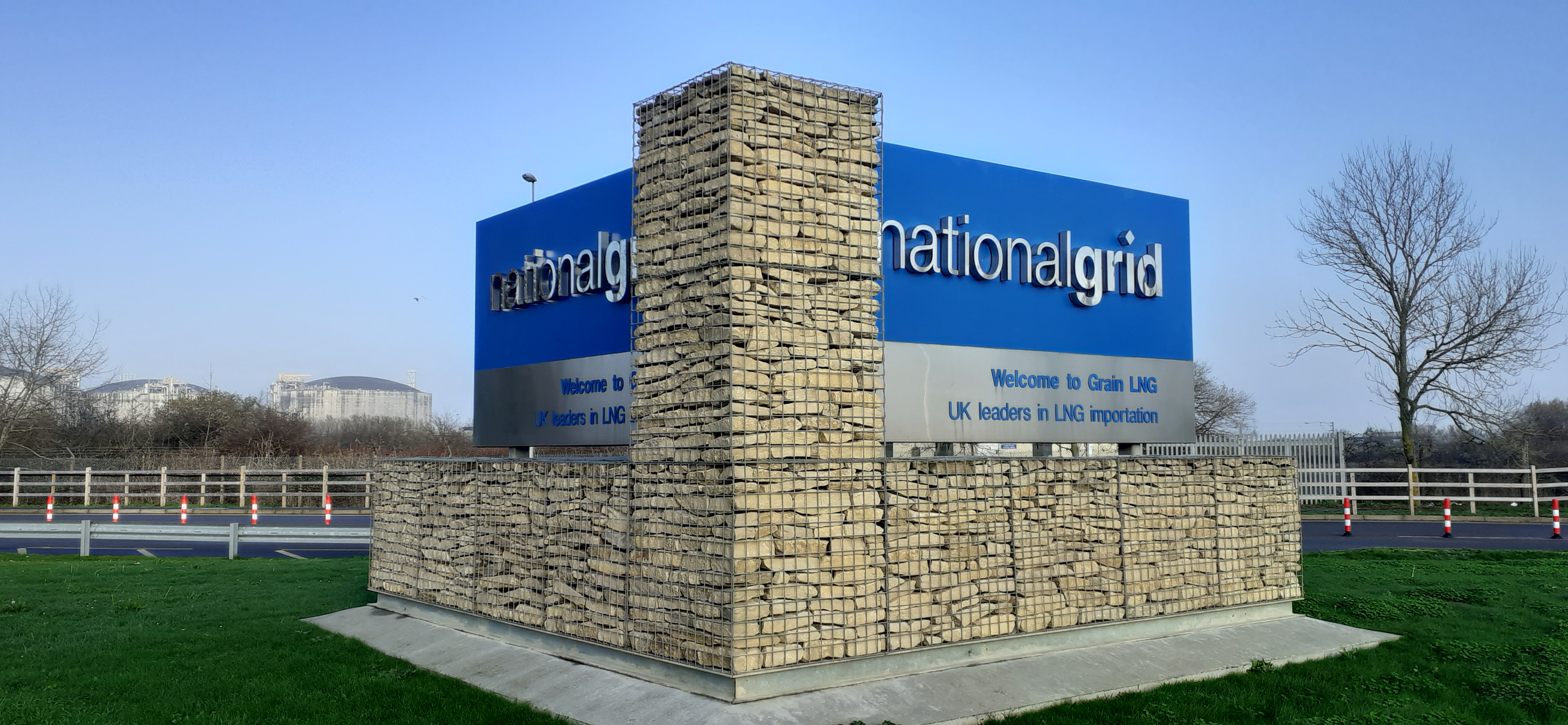
Entrance sign to the LNG terminal.

Grain LNG Terminal is a liquefied natural gas (LNG) terminal on the Isle of Grain, 37 miles (60 km) east of London. It has facilities for the offloading and reloading of LNG from ships at two jetties on the River Medway; for storing and blending LNG; for truck loading; and regasifying and blending natural gas to meet UK specifications. The terminal can handle up to 15 million tonnes per annum of LNG, has a storage capacity for one million cubic metres of LNG, and is able to regasify up to 645 GWh per day (58 million cubic metres per day) for delivery into the high pressure gas National Transmission System (NTS). Since 2025 the site is owned in a 50:50 consortium by Centrica and Energy Capital Partners, who bought it from National Grid.

== History ==
The Grain LNG terminal is located on the site of the BP Kent Refinery which closed in 1982 and was subsequently demolished. The Grain LNG site covers a total area of 600 acres (240 ha).

In 1980 British Gas constructed an LNG peak-shaving facility on the south west of the refinery site. The facility was used to support the NTS at times of high demand, and to ensure the security of gas supplies in SE England. During periods of high demand liquefied gas was pumped from storage tanks and heated in vapourisers to a gaseous state for delivery into the NTS. There are four tanks each of 50,000 m^{3} (total storage capacity of 200,000 m^{3}), constructed of 9% nickel-steel alloy insulated with perlite, each with a containment bund to half the tank height. At times of low demand gas could be withdrawn from the NTS and liquefied by cryogenic cooling to minus 162 °C to replenish the storage tanks. An adjacent gas holder received a gaseous boil-off from the tanks.

== Site development ==
The gas industry and the regulator Ofgem opened up the UK gas market to competition in 1997. This facilitated a variety of shippers to bring LNG from around the world into the UK market. To exploit this position National Grid Grain LNG Ltd was formed in 2002 to develop the Isle of Grain site from a peak-shaving plant into an LNG import, storage, and enhanced regasification facility. Development and expansion has taken place over four phases.

=== Phase 1 (2002–05) ===
Work began in 2002 to convert the facility into a LNG ship import terminal. The original storage tanks were refurbished and new boil-off compression facility for ship offloading was installed. In July 2005 a new 1 km long jetty (Jetty No.10) was commissioned on the north bank of the River Medway at the south-east of the site. The jetty is capable of handling LNG tankers of 70,000 to 217,000 m^{3} cargo capacity (QFlex). LNG is pumped through a 4.5 km cryogenic pipeline system rated at 12,000 m^{3}/h (5,000 tonnes per hour) to the storage tanks located 3.3 km from the jetty. New compressors and vapourisers were also installed. By 2005 the terminal had the capacity to receive and process up to 3.3 million tonnes of LNG a year, or 13 million cubic metres of gas (140 GWh) per day. The new facilities enabled the Grain terminal to become a base supply to the NTS, with the ability to deliver gas continuously when required. The cost of the Phase 1 project was £130m. A 20-year contract with BP / Sonatrach enabled Grain LNG to import LNG on a long-term basis from July 2005.

==== Strategic energy supplies (2003–04) ====
The UK Government's Energy White Paper of February 2003 identified the need for additional infrastructure to assure gas supplies and to reduce the strategic risk to the UK of dependency on a limited number of sources. Having been a net exporter of gas the UK became a net importer in 2004 as demand exceeded gas production from the UK continental shelf. The deficit was initially met by importing gas by pipeline from continental Europe and importing LNG. The LNG was obtained on the competitive world market from a diversity of sources in North and West Africa, Russia, the Middle East and the Caribbean. In this context Grain LNG Ltd further developed the terminal.

=== Phase 2 (2005–08) ===
In 2005-8 Grain LNG Ltd constructed new facilities for the storage and gasification of LNG. The facilities included three LNG storage tanks each with a capacity of 190,000 m^{3} (48.7 m high, 87.4 m diameter), each holding as much as the four original tanks. These are full containment vessels with an inner nickel-steel alloy and an outer pre-stressed concrete wall with a reinforced concrete roof. The tanks were constructed in the north-west part of the site to the north of the existing tanks. Each tank has a concrete mass of 72,000 tonnes and is supported on 1,560 piles, 600 mm in diameter and a depth of 24 metres. The new facilities included eight submerged combustion water bath vapourisers. These heat and vapourise LNG flowing in stainless steel coils from minus 162 °C to 6 °C. Two Combined Heat and Power (CHP) gas turbines provide power to the site, and the waste heat is piped to the adjacent vapourisers, to reduce the gas required for firing. The cost of the Phase 2 facilities was £350m. The capacity was sold to three customers: Sonatrach (Algeria), Centrica and Gaz de France. Under phase 2, a further 6.5 million tonnes per year of capacity was contracted on a long-term basis from December 2008. The new plant brought the capability of the site to a throughput of 10.5 million tonnes of LNG (about 12% of UK gas demand).

=== Phase 3 (2007–10) ===
Phase 3 was announced in May 2007 to increase storage, ship unloading and vapourisation capabilities. A fourth 190,000 m^{3} LNG storage tank was constructed to the east of the three existing tanks. A second jetty (Jetty No. 8) was constructed on the River Medway (after demolition of the former jetty 8) together with an associated cryogenic pipeline to the existing transfer pipeline. The jetty has three 16-inch loading arms and a 16-inch vapour return arm. The jetty is capable of handling LNG tankers of 125,000 to 266,000 m^{3} cargo capacity (QMax). The 36-inch diameter 4.5 km nickel-steel pipeline has a flexible polyurethane (PUR) foam insulation in a high-density polyethylene (HDPE) casing, the line transfers LNG between the jetty and the storage sites. There is also a 14-inch recirculation line. Additional facilities included further submerged combustion vapourisers; boil-off gas compressors; nitrogen facilities; and a vent stack. The development provided an additional five million tonnes of capacity per annum. All this capacity was contracted out from December 2010. Customers included BP, Iberdrola, Sonatrach, Centrica, E.ON and GDF Suez.

The Isle of Grain Combined Heat and Power (CHP) project was completed in late 2010. The CHP plant transferred 340 MW of heat energy from the steam condensation process within the Combined Cycle Gas Turbine (CCGT) to the LNG vapourisers at the Grain LNG site. This further reduced the quantity of gas burned in the vapourisers.

=== Phase 4 (2014–19) ===
Phase 4 of the Grain development was announced in February 2014. This included a proposed fifth 190,000 m^{3} storage tank immediately to the east of the Phase 3 tank. Other proposed facilities include a new process plant (compressors and vapourisers) and a second cryogenic line from the jetty area to the Phase 4 process plant. Grain LNG Ltd has offered an additional six million tonnes per annum of LNG capacity. Phase 4 was completed in the winter of 2018–9.

== Current facilities ==
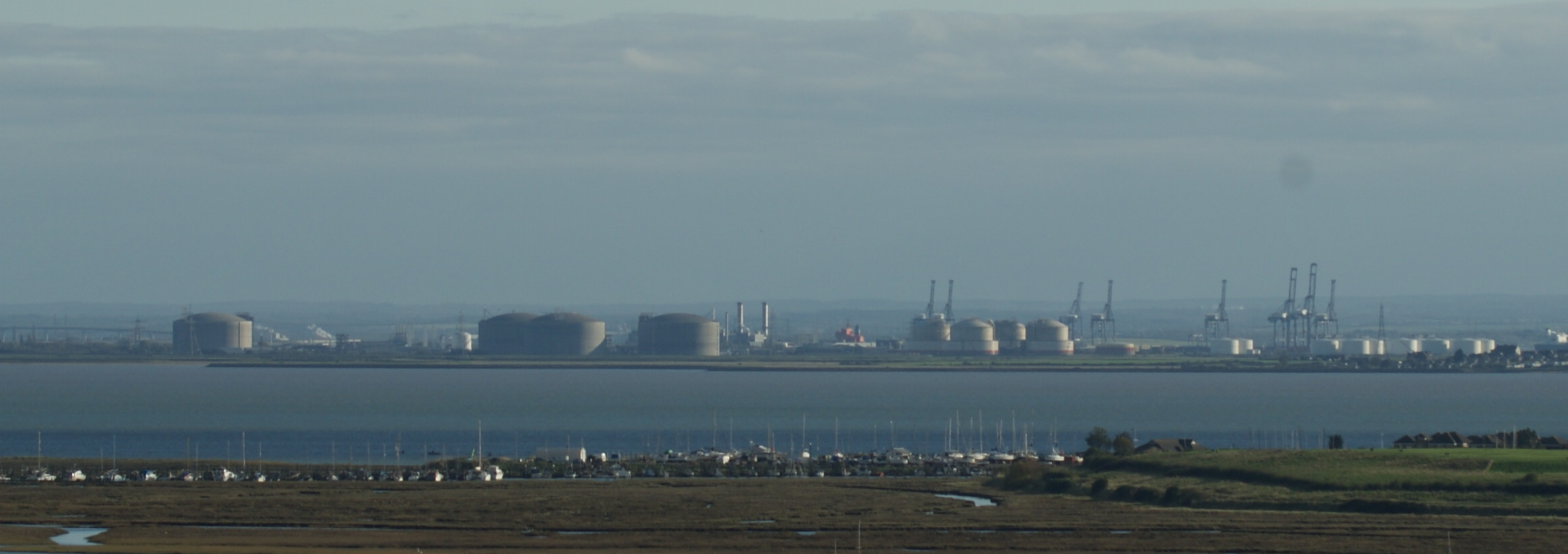
General view of the terminal from across the Thames.

The Grain LNG terminal currently has a LNG storage capacity of one million cubic metres and a throughput capability of 15 million tonnes per annum, equivalent to 20% of UK gas demand. In terms of storage capacity it is the largest LNG facility in Europe and the eighth largest in the world. The regasification plant has a capacity of 645 GWh/day (58 million cubic metres per day). Gas flows in two pipelines to Shorne, Kent, where there are two connections to the NTS: Grain NTS 1 & Grain NTS 2 (also designated NTS Feeder No.5 and Feeder No. 18).

A ship reloading facility was added to the terminal in 2015 to enable shippers to take advantage of competitive world prices. A truck loading facility was commissioned in 2015 to transfer LNG directly to filling stations.

Grain LNG Ltd does not own the LNG or the gas that it handles but charges for gasifying it. Current (2016) users include BP, Centrica (British Gas Trading), Iberdrola (Spain), Sonatrach (Algeria), Engie (France), and Uniper (Germany).

To ensure that the quality of gas entering the NTS meets the requirements of the Gas Safety (Management) Regulations 1996 the terminal has LNG blending facilities. There is a propane storage and blending unit to increase the calorific value of the gas entering the NTS if required. If necessary natural gas can be ballasted with nitrogen to reduce its Wobbe Number; there are two liquid nitrogen plants (owned and operated by Air Products) with a storage capacity of 5,000 tonnes of liquid nitrogen.

Grain LNG is classified as an Upper-Tier site under The Control of Major Accident Hazards (COMAH) Regulations 2015. A siren is installed in Grain village (north-west of the site) that would be used in the event of an incident occurring at the Grain LNG site that requires the activation of the external emergency plan.

== See also ==
- National Transmission System
- South Hook LNG terminal
- Dragon LNG terminal
- Grain power station
- Isle of Grain
