= Goldeneye Gas Platform =

Coordinates: 58°00′N 0°23′W

Location in UK continental shelf, North Sea

Goldeneye Gas Platform was an unmanned and now demolished offshore gas production platform in North Sea block 14/29, in the South Halibut basin area of the outer Moray Firth, 105 km northeast of St Fergus Gas Plant in Scotland.

== Field ==
The field was discovered in October 1996 with well 14/29a-3. The field extends into blocks 14/28b, 20/30b and 20/4b. The reservoir is a lower cretaceous Captain sandstone with high rates of production, up to 2.8 million cubic metres (100 million cubic feet) per day at standard conditions per well and lies at a depth of 2,500 metres (8,300 ft).

== Infrastructure ==
The jacket was a four-legged piled structure weighing 3,500 tonnes, anchored by eight piles weighing 2,500 tonnes. The jacket supported the 1,000 tonnes topsides. The topsides were designed by SLP Engineering Ltd. Production was from five wells with well fluids separated by a single vertical separator vessel. Separated liquids were re-injected into the export gas stream without further treatment. Facilities were provided for the installation of a future produced water coalescer and flash drum. Gas and liquid were piped ashore to St Fergus under well pressure, via a 20 inch pipeline without using compressors, where it was processed. It operated in 120 metres (390 ft) of water.

== Production ==
Production started in 2004 and ceased in 2011. It had a potential use for carbon dioxide storage. The topsides and jacket were removed in September 2021 and taken to Vats, Norway for dismantling and recycling.

Like most North Sea fields operated by Shell, it is named after a bird - in this case Bucephala clangula, a small duck found in Scotland and elsewhere.

== See also ==
- Operation Goldeneye - World War II operation involving Ian Fleming
