= Fulmer (disambiguation) =

Fulmer may refer to:

== Places ==
- Fulmer, a village in Buckinghamshire, England
- Fulmer Creek, a river in upstate New York, USA
- Fulmer Falls, a waterfall in Pennsylvania, USA

== People ==
- Carson Fulmer, American baseball player
- Hampton P. Fulmer, American politician
- Michael Fulmer, American baseball player
- Phillip Fulmer, former head football coach at the University of Tennessee
- Steve Fulmer, Australian rugby league footballer

== Other uses ==
- A type of bit ring on horse bits
- Fulmer Research Institute, a UK research and development organization (1945-1990)

== See also ==
- Fulmar (disambiguation)
