= Frigg UK System =

Natural gas pipeline

Location
- Country: Norway, United Kingdom
- Start: Alwyn North Field
- Passes through: North Sea
- To: St. Fergus, Scotland
- Runs alongside: Vesterled pipeline

General information
- Type: natural gas
- Operator: Px group
- Construction started: 1974
- Commissioned: 1977

Technical information
- Length: 362 km (225 mi)

The Frigg UK System is a natural gas transportation system from the North Sea gas fields to St. Fergus near Peterhead in Scotland. It transports natural gas from the Alwyn North, Dunbar, Ellon, Grant, Nuggets, Frigg, Bruce, Ross, Captain, Buzzard, Tartan, Piper, Chanter, Galley, Hamish, Highlander, Ivanhoe, MacCulloch, Petronella, Saltire, and Rob Roy, fields.

== History ==
Construction of the main pipeline, the Frigg UK pipeline, started in 1974 and was completed in 1977. It was built to transport natural gas from the Frigg gas field to the United Kingdom. Because of technical limitations, it was decided to build two parallel pipelines, one (the Frigg UK pipeline) by the United Kingdom and one by Norway (former Frigg Norwegian Pipeline, now Vesterled). Even in British waters, until 1998 both pipelines were in Norwegian jurisdiction.

== Technical description ==
The system comprises the Frigg UK pipeline, Alwyn pipeline, other connection lines, and processing facilities at the St Fergus Gas Terminal. The 110-kilometre (68 mi) long Alwyn pipeline with diameter of 24 inches (610 mm) connects Alwyn North Field with the Frigg Field's TP1 bypass spool. From the TP1 the 362-kilometre (225 mi) long original Frigg UK Pipeline with diameter of 32 inches (810 mm) runs to the St Fergus Gas Terminal, alongside of the Vesterled pipeline. An 18-inch (460 mm) diameter pipeline connects Tartan and Piper fields with the Frigg UK Pipeline at the MCP-01 platform, 173 kilometres (107 mi) northeast of Aberdeen. The Frigg UK System is operated by Total E&P UK Ltd.
