= Wales & West Utilities =

UK business

- Company type: Private
- Industry: Energy
- Founded: 2005
- Headquarters: Newport, Wales, United Kingdom
- Area served: Wales, South West England
- Products: Gas Distribution
- Owner: CK Hutchison
- Website: www.wwutilities.co.uk

Wales & West Utilities operates the gas distribution network across Wales and South West England in the United Kingdom. It also provides the gas emergency service and delivers the iron mains risk reduction programme in those areas.

== History ==
The company was set up following National Grid plc's decision to sell four of its local gas distribution networks in order to raise funds for expansion.

The Wales & West Utilities consortium, led by the Macquarie European Infrastructure Fund, made a successful bid for the area, and began operations on 1 June 2005. It moved to its current headquarters at Celtic Springs Business Park, Newport, in June 2006. In 2012, the company was sold to several companies controlled by Li Ka Shing.

== Operations ==
The company operates around 35,000 km of gas pipelines, serving an estimated population of 7.5 million. It has operational bases in Wrexham, Flint, Colwyn Bay, Haverfordwest, Swansea, Cardiff, Newport, Evesham, Swindon, Bristol, Bath, Trowbridge, Bridgwater, Weston Super Mare, Exeter, Bideford, Torquay, Plymouth and Redruth.
