= USS Fulmar =

USS Fulmar is a name used more than once by the U.S. Navy:

- USS Fulmar (AMc-46), launched 25 February 1941 by Greenport Basin and Construction Company, Long Island, Greenport, New York
- USS Fulmar (AMS-47), was YMS-193 until 1 September 1947

== See also ==
- USFS Fulmar, a United States Bureau of Fisheries research vessel in commission from 1919 to 1933–1934
