= Fulmar Gas Line =

Natural gas pipeline from the North Sea to Scotland

Location
- Country: United Kingdom
- Direction: east–west
- Start: Fulmar oilfield
- Passes through: North Sea
- To: St Fergus

General information
- Type: natural gas
- Partners: Royal Dutch Shell; ExxonMobil
- Commissioned: 1986

Technical information
- Length: 290 km (180 mi)
- Maximum discharge: 4.4 billion m^{3} per year

The Fulmar Gas Line is a natural gas pipeline which transports natural gas from the central North Sea to St Fergus, Scotland. Originally, the pipeline carried natural gas from Fulmar and Clyde fields. Later also other fields in the Central North Sea, such as Kittiwake, Gannet, Nelson, Anasuria, Curlew, and Triton were connected to the pipeline.

The length of the pipeline is 290 kilometres (180 mi) and diameter is 20 inches (510 mm). It has capacity of 4.4 billion cubic metres (160×10^{9} cu ft) wet natural gas per year. The pipeline commenced operation in May 1986. It is owned and operated by Shell U.K. Limited and Esso Exploration and Production UK Limited.
