= Energetic material =

Stored chemical energy that can be released

Energetic materials are a class of material with high amount of stored chemical energy that can be released.

Typical classes of energetic materials are e.g. explosives, pyrotechnic compositions, propellants (e.g. smokeless gunpowders and rocket fuels), and fuels (e.g. diesel fuel and gasoline).
