= Fulmar Oil Field =

Oil field located in the United Kingdom

- Location within North Sea
- Country: Scotland, United Kingdom
- Region: Central North Sea
- Block: 30/16, 30/11b
- Offshore/onshore: offshore
- Coordinates: 56°29′00″N 2°8′00″E
- Operator: Repsol Sinopec Resources UK Ltd.

Field history
- Discovery: 1975
- Start of production: 1982

Production
- Estimated oil in place: 73.42 million tonnes (~ 85.56×10^{6} m^{3} or 538.2 million bbl)
- Estimated gas in place: 4.09×10^{9} m^{3} (144×10^{9} cu ft)
- Producing formations: Upper Jurassic Fulmar Sandstone

The Fulmar Oilfield is situated 312 km east of Dundee, Scotland, United Kingdom in block number 30/16 and 30/11b. It is operated by Repsol Sinopec who took over from the previous operator, Shell at the end of 2006. At this time Talisman also purchased the equity of the other partners ExxonMobil and Amerada Hess. The field was discovered in December 1975 by well 30/16-6 in a water depth of 82 metres. Estimated ultimate recovery is 544 million barrels (86.5×10^{6} m^{3}) of oil. It is named after the fulmar, a sea bird.

The oil reservoir is located at a depth of 3,050 metres.

The "Fulmar A platform" operates above the oilfield. Production started in February 1982 from the Fulmar 'A' platform. This platform is a steel, 8 legged jacket designed by McDermott Engineering and constructed at Nigg, Easter Ross, Scotland. This jacket weighs 12,400 tonnes and supports a topside weight of around 22,560 tonnes. The jacket and platform were installed in July 1979 and June 1980.

Design data for the installations in the Fulmar field is summarized below.

Fulmar installations design data
Installation	Fulmar A	Fulmar AR	Fulmar mooring terminal	Fulmar FSU
Type	Steel jacket	Steel jacket bridge link to Fulmar A	Single Anchor Leg Mooring (SALM)	Tanker
Function	Drilling, production, accommodation	Wellhead	Loading tankers	Oil storage
Location	56°29’37”N 02°09’17”E		56°28’38”N 02°07’54”E	56°28’38”N 02°07’54”E
Water depth, metres	83.5	83.5	82	82
Fabrication substructure	Highlands Fabricators Nigg	Redpath, Methil	RSV Rotterdam	Mitsubishi Japan, converted by CNC
Topsides design	McDermott, London	McDermott, London	Exxon Production Research	CNC France
Topside weight, tonnes	22,030	260	1966	210,658 (DWT)
Storage, barrels	–	–	Nil	1,368,247
Accommodation (crew)	240	Nil	Nil	91
Legs	8	4	1	–
Piles	32	8	6	–
Well slots	36	6	–	–
Wells	16 production, 10 water injection, 2 gas injection	5	–	–
Throughput oil, barrels per day (bpd)	180,000		90,000	180,000
Water injection, bpd	20,000	–	–	–
Platform installed	June 1980	June 1979	May 1981	May 1981
Production start	May 1982	February 1982	May 1982	May 1982
Oil production to	SALM by 2.3 km 16-inch pipeline (1982)	Fulmar A	Tanker	SALM
Gas production to	St Fergus by 290 km 20-inch pipeline (1986)	–	–	–

The topsides facilities included capability to drill, produce, meter, pump oil and gas. It can also inject both gas and water. Production is exported via the Norpipe system to Teesside.

Associated natural gas from the reservoir is separated and used to power electrical generation with the excess being transported by the Fulmar Gas Pipeline to St. Fergus.

Previously oil was exported by using an oil tanker anchored to the sea bed. The Medora Floating Storage Offloading (FSO) vessel broke free on the evening of 24 December 1988 narrowly missing the BP operated Clyde platform in the process.

At that time Fulmar Alpha was host to a BBC crew who, not only, reported on the event but later delivered a live watchnight service broadcast from the platform in memory of the Piper Alpha disaster. Some of the same BBC crew having come directly from reporting on the Lockerbie disaster.

== See also ==
- Energy policy of the United Kingdom
- Energy use and conservation in the United Kingdom
