= South Hook LNG terminal =

LNG terminal in Pembrokeshire, Wales

Coordinates: 51.720°N 5.079°W

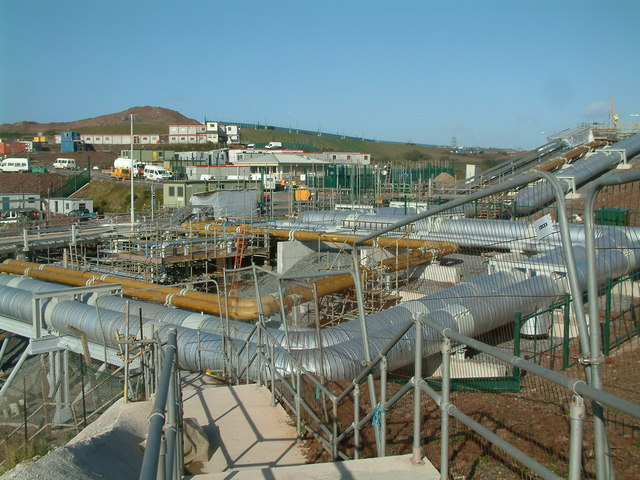
South Hook LNG terminal under construction in 2008

South Hook LNG terminal is an LNG regasification terminal near Milford Haven and is the largest LNG terminal in Europe. Together with the smaller Dragon LNG terminal nearby, it can handle up to 25% of the UK's gas requirement. The first tanker docked on 20 March 2009.

== History ==
The project was announced in April 2003. The terminal is located at the former Esso refinery at South Hook, Herbrandston.

== Description ==
The terminal is built to receive, store and re-gasify liquefied natural gas shipped from the Qatargas 2 LNG plant in Qatar. There are five storage tanks located onsite. The large tanks are each 94 metres in diameter and 31 metres high, rising another 12 metres to the top. The volume of a large tank is roughly that of the Albert Hall. The regasified natural gas is fed through the South Wales Gas Pipeline to the national gas network at Tirley, Gloucestershire.

== Project company ==
The terminal is owned and operated by the South Hook LNG Terminal Company Ltd, a joint venture between Qatar Petroleum LNG Services (QG II) Ltd. (67.5%), ExxonMobil Qatargas (II) Terminal Company Ltd. (24.15%) and ELF Petroleum UK Limited (8.35%).

== Construction ==
The terminal was designed and built by CB&I. At construction peak, some 2,500 people were employed on site. Despite starting work some 3 months later than the nearby Dragon LNG terminal (which has two LNG tanks compared to the 5 at South Hook), South Hook was the first of the two to receive LNG and send natural gas into the national gas network.

The site slopes down towards the River Cleddau. This allowed the tanks to be located such that they cannot be seen from the Milford Haven – Dale road that runs north along the terminal.

== Controversy ==
Droning and vibration from the Qatargas Q-Flex and Q-Max vessels cause nuisance to local residents, who have formed a community group to pressure the South Hook LNG Terminal and Qatargas to comment on the issue. A trial of new exhaust silencers has been implemented but they are not producing a significant improvement in low level frequency mitigation. Local communities are forming a number of pressure groups to encourage the South Hook Terminal, Qatargas and regulatory Authorities to carry out further assessments and enforcement. These groups claim the aim is not to try to close the terminal down, but to encourage a better integration into the community through the use of quiet ships.

There is an ongoing controversy over the safety of the site spearheaded by the Safe Haven group. It is claimed by Safe Haven that in case of gas ignition, it could endanger twenty thousand lives and that there are concerns that sufficient risk assessments had not been carried out into the possibility of a collision or major incident at the port.

== Contracts ==
The main source of cargoes to the terminal is from trains No. 4 and 5 of the Qatargas 2 project in Ras Laffan, Qatar. These are jointly owned by Qatar Petrolium and ExxonMobil. The initial GSPA signed in 2005 was for 15.6 million tonnes per year, but this was reduced to 10.4 million tonnes per year in 2009 when TotalEnergies acquired a 16.7-percent share in one of the Qatargas 2 trains.

In 2014, RasGas and Eon struck a deal for 2 BCM of gas to be delivered into either the IOG terminal or South Hook (likely the IOG) over a four-year period. This was the first deal to be struck by the sister company of Qatargas for deliveries into the UK – as previously the two companies kept their markets very much separate.

== See also ==
- Dragon LNG terminal
- Grain LNG terminal
