= Beryl oil field =

Oil field in the UK sector of the North Sea

- Location within North Sea
- Country: Scotland, United Kingdom
- Region: North Sea
- Location/block: 9/13
- Offshore/onshore: Offshore
- Coordinates: 59°32′47″N 01°32′14″E
- Operator: Mobil (to 2012), Apache (from 2012)
- Owner: see text

Field history
- Discovery: 1972
- Start of production: 1976 (Beryl A), 1984 (Beryl B)

Production
- Producing formations: Sandstones

The Beryl oil field is a major crude oil production field in the UK sector of the northern North Sea, 335 km north east of Aberdeen, Scotland. Production of oil started in 1976 and the field is still producing oil and gas (2021).

== The field ==
The Beryl oil field is located in Block 9/13a of the UK North Sea. It is named after Beryl Solomon wife of Charles Solomon the President of Mobil Europe at the time of the field’s discovery. The Beryl field was discovered in May 1972 and is a Triassic and Jurassic sandstone at an average depth of 11,000 feet (3,353 m). The reservoir and the fluids have the following characteristics:

Beryl reservoirs
Reservoir	Porosity %	Permeability md	Water saturation %	Net/Gross ratio %
Bruce	14	100	10	68
Upper Beryl	17	300	8	90
Middle Beryl	15	100	12	42
Lower Beryl	15	100	12	80
Lewis	15	20	30	50

Beryl reservoir fluids
Parameter	Value
API gravity	36.5°API
Gas Oil Ratio	1,300 standard cubic feet/barrel
Sulfur content	0.3 %
Recoverable reserves Beryl A	500 million barrels
Recoverable reserves Beryl B	300 million barrels
Recoverable gas	1.6 trillion cubic feet

=== Owners and operators ===
The Beryl field was originally licensed to partners comprising Mobil North Sea Ltd (50%), Amerada Hess (UK) Ltd (20%), Texas Eastern North Sea Inc. (20%), and Enterprise Oil Ltd. (10%). Mobil was the Beryl field operator. In January 2012 the Apache Corporation acquired all the assets of Mobil North Sea and from then was the operator of the Beryl field with a 50% interest. The other owners are Hess Limited (22.22%), Enterprise Oil (22.78%) and OMV (UK) Ltd (5%).

== Development ==
The field was initially developed in 1975 by a single integrated drilling, production and accommodation platform Beryl Alpha (or Beryl A) located in the south of the field. Beryl A has oil storage compartments in the gravity base structure. Oil is exported from Beryl A through a pair of SPM (single point mooring) buoys located 2.0 km from Beryl A. Beryl Bravo (Beryl B) was installed in 1983 and located 8 km north of Beryl A to exploit the northern part of the oil field. Oil is exported from Beryl B to Beryl A through a 20-inch pipeline.

As a ‘stranded asset’ with limited infrastructure gas was injected into the reservoir and the surplus was flared. From 1992 gas was exported via the 203 miles (327 km) 30-inch SAGE (Scottish Area Gas Evacuation) pipeline to St. Fergus. In 1990 a riser tower was added to Beryl A to accommodate risers and gas compression equipment to export gas into SAGE. The principal data of the Beryl field platforms is given in the following table.

Beryl field platforms
Installation	Beryl A	Beryl B	Beryl Riser Access Tower (RAT)
Coordinates	59°32’47”N 01°32’14”E	59.610342N 1.512742E	59.545178N 1.535725E
Water depth, metres	117	120	117
Fabrication substructure	Norwegian Contractors Stavanger	RGC Methil	
Fabrication topsides	Aker Arendal	Bechtel Middlesbrough & Cherbourg	
Topside weight, tonnes	28,000	34,300	
Function	Drilling, production, storage, accommodation	Drilling, production, accommodation	Risers, compression
Accommodation	290	200	–
Type	Condeep	Steel jacket	Steel jacket
Legs	3	8	4
Substructure	19 concrete fuel cells	32 skirt piles	
Well slots	40	21	Nil
Throughput oil, bpd	300,000 (including B)	100,000	–
Throughput gas, MMSCFD	150	137	–
Oil storage capacity, barrels	900,000	Nil	Nil
Gas injection, million m^{3}/day	4.0	3.7	–
Water injection	100,000 bwd	Nil	Nil
Installed	July 1975	May 1983	1990
Production start	June 1976	July 1984	1990
Oil production to	SPM buoys	Beryl A	Beryl A
Gas production to	Flare, RAT	SAGE	SAGE

The Beryl partners had sanctioned the construction of Beryl B on the understanding that uplift on allowances against Petroleum Revenue Tax would be available for the expenditure. But the UK Government intended to restrict the uplift. Mobil, on behalf of the Beryl partners, argued that if it had been known that uplift was to be withdrawn the investment in Beryl B would not have been made.

Export of oil from the field was by SPM buoys, the design details of the buoys was as follows.

Beryl SPM loading buoys
	SPM A (SPM1)	SPM B (SPM2)
Coordinates	59.554322 1.562667	59.534403 1.559217
Type	Articulated lattice tower	Articulated cylindrical tower
Water depth, metres	119	120
Supply from	32-inch pipeline from Beryl A	32-inch pipeline from Beryl A
Capacity, barrels/h	40,000	40,000
Loading hose	16-inch	16-inch
Height, metres	149	166
Weight, tonnes	1,200	2,415
Fabrication	CFEM	ACMP, Marseille
Installation	September 1975	September 1982

In 1985 SPM1 broke free from its moorings and was damaged beyond repair. A replacement, SPM3, was installed in 1987.

An emergency flare is bridge-linked to Beryl A. This comprises a 600 feet (183 m) horizontal steel bridge. The bridge is supported by a 410 feet (125 m) high steel tower with a concrete gravity base.

== Production ==
Beryl A was planned to have 30 production wells and 10 gas or water injection wells.

The processing plant on Beryl A had a nominal capacity of 300,000 barrels of oil per day. There are two parallel process trains each capable of processing 150,000 bbl/day. Oil from the wellheads flows to one of the two High Pressure Separators operating at 150 psi where gas flashes off. Oil then passes to the Low Pressure Separator operating at 3 psi for further gas removal. From here oil flows to the storage tanks prior to export via the SPM buoys. Off-gas from the LP separators is compressed to 150 psi in a centrifugal compressor capable of compressing 12 MMSCFD. The compressed gas is mixed with off-gas from the HP Separator the combined flow of 150 MMSCFD is compressed in 2 stages to 5,200 psi and is injected into the reservoir. Gas injection started in November 1977.

Deoxygenated seawater was injected into the reservoir at up to 100,000 barrels per day, this commenced in January 1979.

Beryl B was planned to have 14 production wells, 5 water injection and 2 gas injection wells.

Processing plant comprised a single 3-phase Separator and an electric motor driven gas compressor.

== Redevelopment ==
Further fields in the Beryl area were developed through Beryl A and B.

From 1979 oil was produced from three subsea satellite wells. These were connected to Beryl A by 6-inch flowlines.

Beryl subsea wells
Well	9/13a-6A	9/13a-15	9/13a-20B
Distance	3.35 km	7.01 km	4.57 km
Installation	November 1978	January 1979	September 1979
First production	End 1979	End 1979	End 1979

Further developments included production from small oil and gas fields in the Beryl area. Information on these fields is summarized in the table. Nevis, Ness and Linnhe are named after Scottish lochs.

Beryl area satellite fields
Field	Nevis South	Nevis North, Central, West	Ness	Buckland	Skene	Linnhe
Block	9/13	9/13	9/13b	9/18	9/19	9/13
Discovery			1986	1999	2001	1988
Recoverable reserves, million tonnes			5.4			
Oil gravity, °API			37		–	
Water depth, metres	108		113	120	118	123
Production start	1996, now ceased		1988	1999	2001	1989, ceased 1991
Production rate			1.0 million tonnes/year	30,000 bbl/d	180 MMSCFD	
Production to	Beryl A	Beryl B	Beryl B	Beryl A	Beryl A	Beryl B

== Decommissioning ==
Nevis South and Linnhe subsea installations have been decommissioned.
