= St Fergus =

Village in Aberdeenshire, Scotland

Coordinates: 57°33′30″N 1°50′11″W

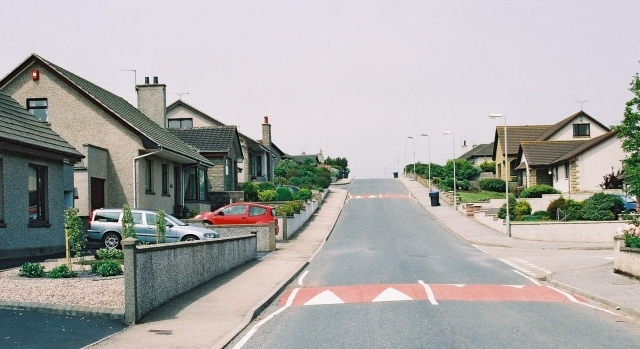
- Modern housing in St Fergus

- Location within Aberdeenshire
- Population: 740 (2020)
- OS grid reference: NK095521
- Council area: Aberdeenshire
- Lieutenancy area: Aberdeenshire
- Country: Scotland
- Sovereign state: United Kingdom
- Post town: Peterhead
- Postcode district: AB42
- Police: Scotland
- Fire: Scottish
- Ambulance: Scottish
- UK Parliament: Aberdeenshire North and Moray East
- Scottish Parliament: Banffshire and Buchan Coast

St Fergus (Scottish Gaelic: Peit Fhearghais) is a village in the Buchan area of Aberdeenshire, Scotland. St Fergus lies 1 mile (1.6 km) from the North Sea coast and 3 miles (5 km) north-west of Peterhead. The Parish of St Fergus includes the remains of Inverugie Castle and Ravenscraig Castle. The church in the village was built in 1763. The church for this parish previously stood in the old kirkyard near the shore 2 miles (3 km) to the east. This site on the St Fergus Links is still used as a burial ground. Prior to the change in site of the church the parish was known as Longley and at a still more remote period Inverugie.

== History ==
Historically, the 9,000 acres (3,600 ha) of St Fergus parish formed a detached portion of Banffshire. The parish was transferred to Aberdeenshire in 1891. At that time it had a population of 1,527.

The beach area was classed as a risk during WW2 as a possible (but unlikely) landing area for a German invasion. Several pillboxes and anti-tank blocks were placed along the coast. These formed part of the Rattray stop line. Anti-tank ditches are still visible today. A minefield was laid on St Fergus links and Craigwan sands. On 30 November 1941, 11-year-old John Paul, 12-year-old James Reekie and Corporal Ronald Cumbley of the Royal Engineers were killed by a landmine. Two other soldiers were also injured. On 26 March 1946, Lance Corporal Reginald Wallis, age 26, and Corporal John Wood, age 23, of 11 Bomb Disposal company were killed whilst clearing landmines from the area. Corporal Wood stepped on the mine, thereby detonating it.

During mine clearing operations by 11th Company Bomb Disposal, a British Empire Medal was awarded to Sgt Robert Husband. Sgt Husband assisted a platoon officer dealing with mines that had fallen down a cliff when rough weather caused a bank of sand to collapse.

The St Fergus Gas Terminal situated to the north of the village, began operating in 1977 and was officially opened on 9 May 1978. The terminal consists of plants operated by a number of different oil and gas companies, and processes up to 60 million m^{3} (2.1 billion cu ft) of North Sea gas per day, amounting to 15% of the United Kingdom gas demand.

== Transportation ==
The town is served by buses between Fraserburgh and Aberdeen (via Peterhead).
