= Aukra =

Aukra may refer to:

== Places ==
- Aukra Municipality, a municipality in Møre og Romsdal county, Norway
- Aukra or Aukrasanden, a village within Aukra Municipality in Møre og Romsdal county, Norway
- Aukra Church, a church in Aukra Municipality in Møre og Romsdal county, Norway

== Transportation ==
- Aukra Auto, a transportation company based in Aukra Municipality in Møre og Romsdal county, Norway
- Aukra Airport, Gossen, an airport in Aukra Municipality in Møre og Romsdal county, Norway
- Aukra Bruk, a ship building company in Aukra, Norway, that is now part of Fincantieri
