= Røssøyvågen =

Village in Aukra Municipality, Norway

- Village
- Interactive map of Røssøyvågen
- Location within Møre og Romsdal Location within Norway
- Coordinates: 62.8174°N 6.8042°E
- Country: Norway
- Region: Western Norway
- County: Møre og Romsdal
- District: Romsdal
- Municipality: Aukra Municipality
- Elevation: 1 m (3.3 ft)
- Time zone: UTC+01:00 (CET)
  - Summer (DST): UTC+02:00 (CEST)
- Post Code: 6480 Aukra

Røssøyvågen is a village in Aukra Municipality in Møre og Romsdal county, Norway. It is located on the west side of the island of Gossa. It is located about 5 kilometres (3.1 mi) northwest of the village of Varhaugvika, about 7 kilometres (4.3 mi) northwest of the village of Aukrasanden (both on Gossa), and about 10 kilometres (6.2 mi) west of the Nyhamna peninsula.
