= Varhaugvika =

Village in Aukra Municipality, Norway

- Village
- Interactive map of Varhaugvika
- Location within Møre og Romsdal Location within Norway
- Coordinates: 62.8069°N 6.8973°E
- Country: Norway
- Region: Western Norway
- County: Møre og Romsdal
- District: Romsdal
- Municipality: Aukra Municipality
- Elevation: 25 m (82 ft)
- Time zone: UTC+01:00 (CET)
  - Summer (DST): UTC+02:00 (CEST)
- Post Code: 6480 Aukra

Varhaugvika is a village in Aukra Municipality in Møre og Romsdal county, Norway. It is located on the eastern side of the island of Gossa along the Julsundet strait. It makes up the northern part of the Aukrasanden urban area. The municipal centre of Aukra is at Falkhytta, just south of Varhaugvika. It is located about 6 kilometres (3.7 mi) southwest of the Nyhamna's gas processing facility. The village of Røssøyvågen lies about 5 kilometres (3.1 mi) northwest of Varhaugvika.

The 0.57-square-kilometre (140-acre) village had a population (2000) of 355. Since then, Varhaugvika has been considered a part of the Aukrasanden urban area so the population and area data for this village area has not been separately tracked by Statistics Norway. In 2024, the 1.18-square-kilometre (290-acre) village area of Varhaugvika and Aukrasanden has a population (2024) of 978 and a population density of 829 inhabitants per square kilometre (2,150/sq mi).
