= Nyhamna Gas Plant =

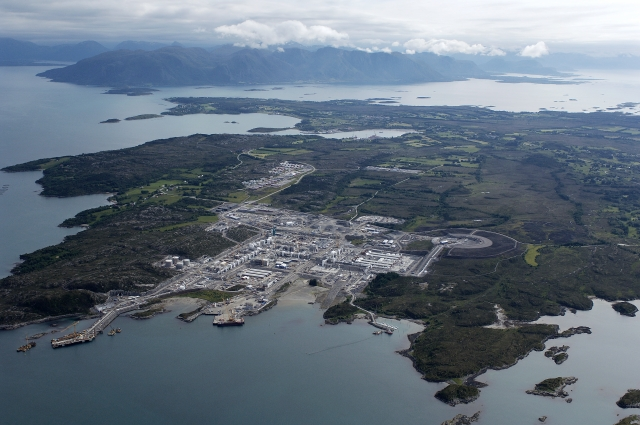
- Nyhamna gas terminal

- Shown within Norway
- Alternative names: Nyhamna, Ormen Lange Land Facility, Ormen Lange landanlegg

General information
- Type: Gas terminal
- Location: Aukra Municipality, Møre og Romsdal
- Coordinates: 62.832°N 6.93°E
- Construction started: 16 April 2004
- Completed: September 2007
- Owner: Norske Shell

Design and construction
- Services engineer: Vetco Aibel, AF Group
- Civil engineer: Skanska, NCC
- Main contractor: Aker Kvaerner

The Nyhamna Gas Plant is a large and significant natural-gas processing plant in Aukra Municipality, Møre og Romsdal, Norway. As of January 2018, Norway was the world's third-largest natural gas exporter, after Russia and Qatar.

== History ==
Construction of the plant began around 2005, and was expected to cost about £5,500,000,000, including the extremely long undersea pipeline. The gas plant was built for the Ormen Lange gas field, named after a ship of a Viking king. The head of the Ormen Lange project was Tom Rotjer. The site was built by Norsk Hydro, with partnership with Royal Dutch Shell, ExxonMobil and Petoro which is owned by the Norwegian government. When being built, the plant was Norway's largest construction project.

In 2005, Norway supplied 15% of the UK's natural gas. Once the gas plant was up and running, 20% of the UK's gas was coming from the Langeled pipeline. It supplies heat to around 10 million British people.

Shell took over as operator on 1 December 2007.

Statnett built a 180-megawatt (240,000 hp) gas power plant in 2008, but it only operated 400 hours in 10 years, and was put up for sale.

== Operation ==
It is situated at Nyhamna on the island of Gossa in Aukra Municipality. The island municipality has about 3,600 residents.

=== Langeled pipeline ===
The Langeled pipeline was built for Norsk Hydro, to begin operation in 2007, via the Sleipner gas field; as it passes through the Sleipner field, it is possible for this gas to be diverted to other countries. The pipeline travels an incredible 745 miles (1,200 km) to the Easington Gas Terminal in Yorkshire, England. The pipeline was built around the clock, 24 hours a day, with the pipeline sections being welded on Acergy's construction ship LB200, which could lay about 4 km a day. It required 1.2 million tonnes of steel. Langeled was the responsibility of Statoil. The pipeline sections for the southern section were assembled at the Bredero Shaw site in Farsund in Southern Norway (Sørlandet). The northern section was assembled at Måløy in Western Norway, and the middle sections at Sotra in Western Norway.

From Nyhamna to Sleipner, the pipeline has a 42-inch (107 cm) diameter, and from Sleipner to Easington it has a 44-inch (112 cm) diameter. The section from Sleipner to Easington became operational on Sunday 1 October 2006. The project for the pipeline had begun in October 2004.

== Gas fields ==
=== Ormen Lange ===
Ormen Lange is located about 65 miles (105 km) west of the gas plant. The field was discovered by Norsk Hydro in 1997. The wells were drilled by the ship West Navigator. The operation of Ormen Lange was owned 18% by Norsk Hydro, 17% by Norske Shell, 36% by Petoro, 10% by Statoil, 10% by Dansk Olie og Naturgas, and 7% by ExxonMobil (Esso). Ormen Lange is Norway's second largest gas field.

== See also ==
- Energy in Norway
