= Hollingen =

Village in Aukra Municipality, Norway

- Village
- Interactive map of Hollingen
- Location within Møre og Romsdal Location within Norway
- Coordinates: 62.7852°N 6.9941°E
- Country: Norway
- Region: Western Norway
- County: Møre og Romsdal
- District: Romsdal
- Municipality: Aukra and Hustadvika

Area
  - Total: 0.79 km^{2} (0.31 sq mi)
- Elevation: 23 m (75 ft)

Population (2024)
  - Total: 1,227
  - Density: 1,553/km^{2} (4,020/sq mi)
- Time zone: UTC+01:00 (CET)
  - Summer (DST): UTC+02:00 (CEST)
- Post Code: 6480 Aukra

Hollingen is a village in Møre og Romsdal county, Norway. The village is mostly in Aukra Municipality, but about a third of the village area lies to the north of the municipal border inside Hustadvika Municipality. It is located on the Romsdal peninsula along the Julsundet strait about 15 kilometres (9.3 mi) northwest of the city of Molde. The village is mostly located on the small part of Aukra that is located on the mainland (most of the municipality is located on the island of Gossa). The village has ferry service across the Julsundet strait to the village of Aukrasanden on Gossa.

The 0.79-square-kilometre (200-acre) village has a population (2024) of 1,227 and a population density of 1,553 inhabitants per square kilometre (4,020/sq mi). About 0.51 square kilometres (130 acres) of the village lies in Aukra Municipality and the remaining 0.28 square kilometres (69 acres) in Hustadvika Municipality. Of the village population, 777 residents of the village live in Aukra and the remaining 450 in Hustadvika.
