= Easington Gas Terminal =

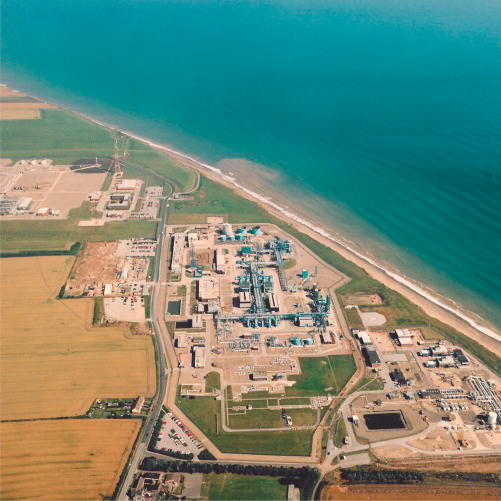
- Easington and Dimlington gas terminals

- Location within East Riding of Yorkshire
- Alternative names: Easington

General information
- Type: Gas terminal
- Location: Easington, East Riding of Yorkshire, HU12 0TG
- Coordinates: 53.65480°N 0.11978°E
- Current tenants: Centrica Storage, Perenco-UK, Gassco
- Completed: March 1967
- Owner: Centrica Storage, Perenco-UK, Gassco

Technical details
- Floor area: 87.5 acres (Dimlington)

The Easington Gas Terminal is one of six main gas terminals in the UK, and is situated on the North Sea coast at Easington, East Riding of Yorkshire and Dimlington. The other main gas terminals are at St Fergus, Aberdeenshire; Bacton, Norfolk; Teesside; Theddlethorpe, Lincolnshire (now demolished) and Rampside gas terminal, Barrow, Cumbria. The whole site consists of four plants: two run by Perenco, one by Centrica and one by Gassco. The Easington Gas Terminals are protected by Civil Nuclear Constabulary officers and are provided with resources by the Centre for the Protection of National Infrastructure.

== History ==
BP Easington Terminal opened in March 1967. This was the first time that North Sea Gas had been brought ashore in the UK from the West Sole field. In 1980 British Gas purchased the field Rough and in 1983 began conversion to a storage field. BP Dimlington opened in October 1988. BP's Ravenspurn North field was added in 1990 and the Johnston field was added in 1994. The Easington Catchment Area was added in 2000, and the Juno development in 2003. Up to 20% of the winter peak demand for gas is exported from Easington via Feeder 9 through the Humber Gas Tunnel.

=== Discovery of gas in the North Sea ===
Britain's first oil rig, the Sea Gem, first discovered gas in the North Sea on 20 August 1965. It was not a large enough field, but at the time it was not even known that there was a large amount of gas under the North Sea. Unfortunately the rig sank in December later that year, when it capsized. The Forties and Brent oilfields were discovered later in 1970 and 1971 respectively.

=== Langeled pipeline ===
Since October 2006, gas has been brought into the UK direct from the Norwegian Sleipner gas field via the Langeled pipeline, the world's longest subsea pipeline before the completion of the Nord Stream pipeline, owned by Gassco which itself is owned by the Kingdom of Norway.

== Operation ==
The sites are run by and gas is produced by Perenco (after BP sold its operations to them in 2012), Gassco and Centrica Storage Ltd. Gas can be transferred to and from the Centrica Storage plant at Easington dependent on grid demand. The control of the Perenco sites takes place at the Dimlington site, and conditioning of the gas also takes place there. The function that is at the Perenco Easington site is the connection to the National Transmission System. Gas flows from the Easington terminal via a 24-inch diameter, 90-mile (140 km) pipeline known as Feeder No 1 across the Humber to Totley near Sheffield. Perenco Easington used to compress gas as well, but from 2007 to 2009, the construction of the £125 million Onshore Compression and Terminal Integration Project (OCTIP) situated all compression and processing from the gas fields at the Dimlington site. As part of the facility, two RB211-GT61 gas turbines, built by Rolls-Royce Energy Systems in Mount Vernon, Ohio, were installed in a £12.7 million contract.

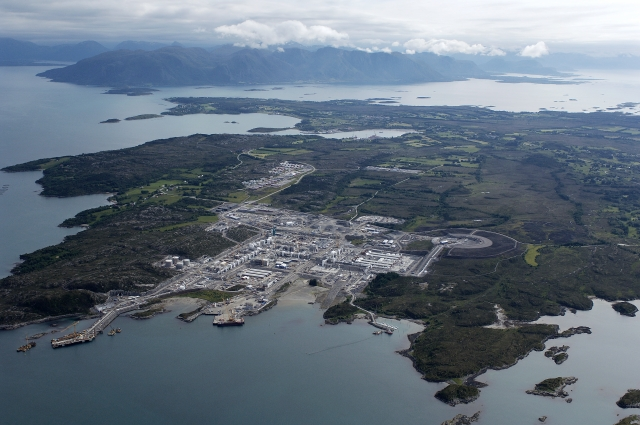
The Langeled pipeline collects gas - around 20% of the UK's needs - from the Nyhamna Gas Plant, and the Ormen Lange gas field; from 2006 to 2011, the Langeled pipeline was the longest undersea pipeline in the world

=== Centrica Rough Terminal ===
The Rough (facility) is a partially depleted offshore gas field that was converted for storage by British Gas. It is currently operated by Centrica Storage Ltd (a subsidiary of Centrica). The Rough Terminal also processes gas for the newly developed York field. The Rough Terminal used to receive gas from the Amethyst gasfield which was until 1988 owned by Britoil but this is now processed by Perenco. Since 2013 The Rough Terminal has also processed gas from the York field on behalf of Centrica Energy.

=== Langeled Receiving Facilities ===
The Langeled pipeline, which is controlled at the UK end by Gassco (Centrica Storage Ltd before 2011), can transfer up to 2,500 m cubic feet of gas per day from Nyhamna in Norway.

=== Perenco Easington ===
The gas is collected from the Hyde, Hoton, Newsham and West Sole natural gas fields. It can process up to 300 m cubic feet of gas per day. A gas turbine power generator is used to compress the gas.

=== Perenco Dimlington ===
Dimlington is the larger site of the four. The natural gas condensate is transferred to the Dimlington terminal. Dimlington also processes dry gas from the (former) Cleeton, Ravenspurn South, Ravenspurn North, Johnston, the Easington Catchment Area (Neptune and Mercury), and the Juno development (Whittle, Wollaston, Minerva and Apollo) gas fields. The Dimlington site has the control room for all of Perenco's gas fields that ship gas to the Easington site. Dimlington can handle up to 950m cubic feet of gas per day.

=== Fire risk ===
All sites are a considerable fire hazard, so have large water reservoirs for fire fighting containing about one million and three million litres of water each.

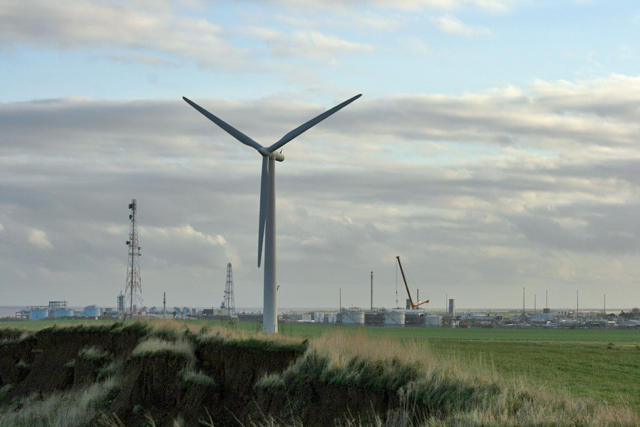
View from the north in November 2008

== Dimlington gas fields ==
=== Cleeton ===
Cleeton and Ravenspurn South form part of the Villages Complex. Both were discovered in 1976. Gas production began in April 1987. Production stopped in 1999. Now used as a hub for the Easington Catchment Area. Named after former villages.

=== Ravenspurn South ===
Discovered in April 1983, 43 miles (70 km) off the East Riding of Yorkshire coast. Gas production began in October 1989. Gas via Cleeton to Dimlington. Named after Ravenspurn, the former coastal town. Owned and operated by Perenco.

=== Ravenspurn North ===
Discovered in October 1984 and developed in April 1988 by Hamilton Brothers. First gas produced in October 1989, and BP took over the operatorship of the field from BHP on 12 January 1998. Gas via Cleeton to Dimlington. Operated by Perenco and owned mostly by them, with smaller parts owned by Centrica Resources Ltd and E.ON Ruhrgas UK EU Ltd.

=== Johnston ===
Operated by E.ON Ruhrgas, and previously to them, Caledonia EU, and also by Consort EU Ltd. Discovered in April 1990. Gas first produced in October 1994. Pipeline to Dimlington via Ravenspurn North and Cleeton. Owned 50% by Dana Petroleum (E&P) Ltd and E.ON Ruhrgas UK EU Ltd.

=== Babbage ===
Discovered in 1989 with the first gas being brought ashore in August 2010. Gas will be transported via West Sole to Dimlington. Owned 40% by Dana Petroleum (E&P) Ltd, 47% by E.ON Ruhrgas UK EU Ltd and 13% by Centrica Resources Ltd. Named after the mathematician, Charles Babbage.

=== Easington Catchment Area ===
Consists of Neptune and Mercury fields. Operated by BG Group. Transported to Dimlington via BP's Cleeton.

Mercury discovered in February 1983 and production started in November 1999. Named after the planet Mercury. 73% owned by BG Group. Neptune discovered in November 1985 and production started in November 1999. Named after the planet Neptune. 79% owned by BG Group.

=== Juno development ===
These are the most recent of the Dimlington gas fields. Named after Juno, the Roman goddess.

BG Group operates the Minerva, Apollo and Artemis fields, and owns 65% of these fields. Production started in 2003. Artemis was discovered in August 1974, and named after Artemis the Greek hunter goddess. Apollo was discovered in July 1987, named after Apollo the Greek sungod, brother of Artemis. Minerva was discovered in January 1969, named after the Roman goddess Minerva.

BP operates the Whittle and Wollaston fields. They are 30% owned by BG Group. Production started in 2002. Wollaston was discovered in April 1989, and named after William Hyde Wollaston, the Norfolk chemist. Whittle was discovered in July 1990, and named after Frank Whittle.

== Easington gas fields ==
These fields are around 43 miles (70 km) off the East Riding of Yorkshire coast. These fields are connected to the national grid by BP and Rough Terminals. Some of these were one of the 'Villages' gas fields; named after villages lost to the sea along the Holderness coast. These villages include: Cleeton, Dimlington, Hoton, Hyde, Newsham and Ravenspurn.

=== West Sole ===
Discovered in December 1965, 42 miles (68 km) east of the Humber. It is a faulted dome whose maximum dimensions are about 12 by 3 miles (19.3 by 4.8 km) wide, lying at a depth of 9,000 feet (2,700 m). The reservoir comprises about 400 feet (120 m) of Permian Rotliegendes sandstone, and the gas has a high methane content and low nitrogen (1.3%). Gas first produced in March 1967. It had initial recoverable reserves of 61 billion m^{3}. Owned and operated by BP until 2012. Acquired by Perenco 2012

=== Hyde ===
Discovered in May 1982. Gas first produced in August 1993. Was owned 55% by BP and 45% by Statoil. BP took control in January 1997, in exchange for its Jupiter gas field.

=== Newsham ===
Discovered in October 1989. Production began March 1996. Enters the West Sole pipeline. Owned and operated by BP.

=== Hoton ===
Discovered in February 1977. Gas first produced in December 2001. Owned and operated by BP. Named after Hoton, one of the East Riding of Yorkshire lost villages that fell into the sea due to coastal erosion.

=== Amethyst East and West ===
Amethyst East discovered in October 1972 and Amethyst West in April 1970. Owned 59.5% by BP, 24% by BG Group, 9% by Centrica, and 7.5% by Murphy. Amethyst East began in October 1990 and Amethyst West in July 1992. Control of the platform is entirely from Dimlington and therefore operated by BP. Comprises the Amethyst gasfield. Acquired by Perenco 2012

=== Rough ===
Discovered in May 1968. It had initial recoverable reserves of 14 billion m^{3}. Gas production began in 1975, and it was bought by British Gas in 1980. In 1983, they decided to convert it into gas storage. The gas storage started February 1985. As a depleted gas field, it is used as a storage facility, for essentially the whole of the UK, giving four days worth of gas. Originally owned by BG Storage Ltd (BGSL), who were bought by Dynegy Europe Ltd in November 2001 for £421 million. BGSL became known as Dynegy Storage Ltd, based in Solihull. This company was bought by Centrica on 14 November 2002 for £304 million. Centrica was essentially buying the Easington plant. To operate the field Centrica has to comply with a set of undertakings laid down by DECC and Ofgem due to its unique position in the UK gas market.

=== York ===
Owned and operated by Centrica. Gas back to Centrica Rough Terminal via new pipeline.

=== Helvellyn ===
Discovered in February 1985 with the first gas coming on stream in 2004. Operated by ATP Oil and Gas. Owned 50% by ATP Oil & Gas (UK) Ltd and First Oil Expro Ltd. Gas back to Easington via the Amethyst field. Named after Helvellyn in Cumbria.

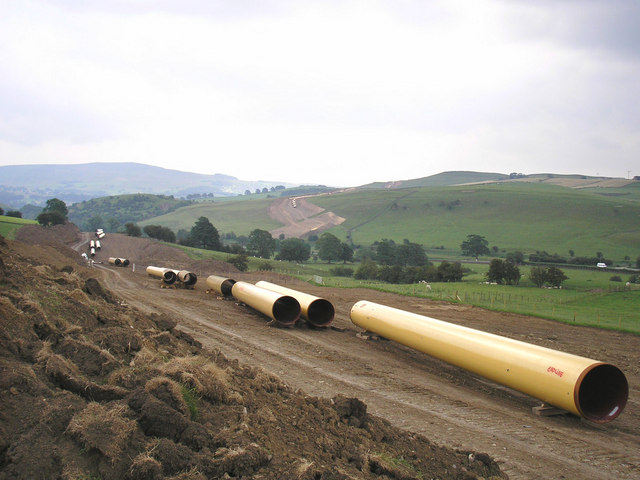
Gas pipeline being built in North Yorkshire in June 2006, for connection to Easington

=== Rose ===
Discovered in March 1998. Owned and operated by Centrica with the gas pumped back to Easington via the Amethyst field. The operation started in 2004 and was plugged and abandoned in 2015.

== See also ==
- List of oil and gas fields of the North Sea
- Oil fields operated by BP
- St Fergus Gas Terminal
- Bacton Gas Terminal
- Energy in the United Kingdom
