= Geology of the Norwegian Sea =

The geology of the Norwegian Sea began to form 60 million years ago in the early Cenozoic, as rifting led to the eruption of mafic oceanic crust, separating Scandinavia and Greenland. Together with the North Sea the Norwegian Sea has become highly researched since the 1960s with the discovery of oil and natural gas in thick offshore sediments on top of the Norwegian continental shelf.

== Geological history ==
The metamorphic crystalline basement rock underlying the continental shelf in the Norwegian Sea is related to the ancient continent Baltica, which now forms the stable East European Craton. The sequence of events in the Mid-Norwegian Shelf is perhaps most relevant to the geological history of the Norwegian Sea. Early rifts began in the late Paleozoic between what is now Norway and Greenland during the time of the Caledonian orogeny. Rifting seemingly continued through the Carboniferous, Permian and into the Mesozoic, but subsequent tectonic activity and thick overlying sediment complicates the record. Large offshore sandstone deposits suggest a high-energy shallow water environment during the early Jurassic. The Harstad, Tromsø, Bjørnøya and Sørvestsnaget basins all developed during the late Jurassic and into the Cretaceous as the rifting which formed the Atlantic Ocean propagated northward and began to open the Norwegian Sea. Fine-grained clastic rock filled in the Vøring and Møre basins by the mid-Cretaceous while coarser material continued to fill in the Vøring basin during the Cenomanian and Campanian. The rifting which finally completed the opening of the sea from 60 to 55 million years ago created the Utgard High and Fles Fault Complex, uplifted southwestern Norway and led to the eruption of large volumes of lava for almost six million years. After this period, the continental shelf became a more passive margin. Reverse faults and the formation of domes and anticlines at some point in the mid-Cenozoic and the Molo Formation indicate some mild tectonic activity and a slight uplift of western Scandinavia.

== Oil and gas exploration ==
Oil and gas exploration on the Mid-Norwegian Shelf began in 1980, with fields producing since 1993. The Halten and Dønna terraces of the nearer shore Trøndelag Platform were first to be explored. Most drilling in the "Haltenbanken" targeted the complicated fault blocks and horst and graben features of the Halten Terrace, particularly the Spekk Formation. Other rocks include the sandstones and shales of the Åre, Tilje, Tofte, Ile and Garn formations. Hydrocarbons are as much as four or five kilometers deep in the Kristin and Smørbukk fields.

In the late 1990s, exploration shifted further offshore. Initially, there were concerns that when thick layers of lava deposited they may have superheated the rocks, perhaps generating natural gas. However, Cretaceous rocks in the Vøring and Møre basins are incredibly thick, ranging between six and seven kilometers. Jurassic source rocks matured by the time Cretaceous rocks were done being deposited. Subsequently, when the Helland Hansen Arch, Ormen Lange Dome and Gjallar Ridge formed some gas was trapped at depth.

The Ormen Lange natural gas field started producing from Cretaceous and Paleocene sandstones sometimes over a kilometer beneath the water and beneath Storegga Slide debris in the Møre basin. Throughout the 1990s the Norwegian Deepwater Program conducted research on the debris field of this massive underwater landslide, 8000 years ago, to determine if oil and gas development would be safe in the field.
