= Amethyst gas field =

Natural gas field in the North Sea

Amethyst gasfield
- Location within North Sea
- Country: United Kingdom
- Location: Southern North Sea
- Blocks: 47/8a, 47/9a, 47/13a, 47/14a, 47/15a
- Offshore/onshore: offshore
- Coordinates: 53°38′N 0°37′E
- Operator: BP
- Partners: BP, Centrica, Murphy Oil

Field history
- Discovery: 1972
- Start of development: 1988
- Start of production: 1991

Production
- Estimated gas in place: 1,100×10^{9} cu ft (31×10^{9} m^{3})
- Producing formations: Lower Leman Sandstone Formation (Permian sandstone)

Amethyst is a natural gas field in the Southern North Sea, about 30 miles (48 km) east of the Yorkshire coast. Gas lies in a Permian sandstone reservoir around 2,700 metres (8,900 ft) below the seabed. The gasfield is operated by BP.

== History ==
The gasfield was discovered in 1972 and it was named after HMS Amethyst. Between 1972 and 1985 a number of appraisal wells were drilled. The field development started in 1988 and the first gas was produced in 1991. Originally, the field was owned by BP, Enterprise Oil, British Gas, ARCO, Murphy Oil, Amerada Hess, and FINA. In 1997, BP acquired the interest of Enterprise Oil and became the largest stakeholder of the field. As a result of restructuring and several transactions the field became held by BP (59.5%), BG (24.15%), Centrica (8.95%), and Murphy Oil (7.4%). In December 2009, BP and BG agreed an assets swap by which BP took over BG's interest in the field.

The Helvellyn gas field was discovered in Block 47/10a in 1985. It was developed by ATP Oil & Gas Corporation as a subsea wellhead in 2004 with production routed to Amethyst A2D.

The Rose gas field (Block 47/15) comprised a single subsea well tied back to the Amethyst A2D platform via a 9.042 km, 10” pipeline. Control of the tree at Rose, and a methanol supply, was by a 9.400 km nominal 4” diameter umbilical from the A2D platform. First gas was achieved in 2004, and was closed in 2015.

In September 2007, three crew members of the emergency response and rescue vessel Viking Islay, operated by Vroon Offshore Services, were killed during a support operation on the Amethyst gasfield.

The B1D platform acted as a lighthouse for the northern end of Outer Dowsing sand bank.

== Production ==
Production is performed using four small unmanned steel satellite wellhead platforms. The A1D platform and the A2D platform were built in 1989 by UiE Scotland in Glasgow, and have 5 and 6 wells respectively in Amethyst East. B1D and C1D were built in the following two years and currently produce from 4 and 7 wells in Amethyst East and Amethyst West respectively. C1D is connected to A1D and B1D is connected to A2D. All Amethyst daily operation and processing is carried out onshore. Personnel only travel to the platforms themselves for maintenance and well work. Produced gas is transported to the Easington Gas Terminal and sold to Électricité de France.

Production profile, in million cubic metres per year (mcm/y), of the Amethyst East field
Production profile, in million cubic metres per year (mcm/y), of the Amethyst West field

At the end of 2014 Amethyst East had delivered 15,778 mcm of gas since 1990 and Amethyst West 6,410 mcm.

== Decommission ==
In April 2020, Perenco submitted its draft decommissioning programmes for four Amethyst A1D, A2D, B1D & C1D topsides to the UK authorities. In 2012, the field operatorship was handed over from BP to Perenco. Perenco explored all avenues for continuing production and concluded that due to high operational costs and a reduction of gas production, continued operations are uneconomical. In July 2020, Perenco received approval for its draft decommissioning programmes for four Amethyst gas field topsides, located in the Southern North Sea, from the UK authorities. At time of submitting the plans, the firm said it expected topside removal for the C1D, B1D and A1D installations between Q4 of 2023 and Q1 of 2024, with A2D following in the third quarter of 2024.

== See also ==
- Oil fields operated by BP
- North Sea oil
- Oil industry
