= Aukra Auto =

Norwegian transport company

Aukra Auto AS
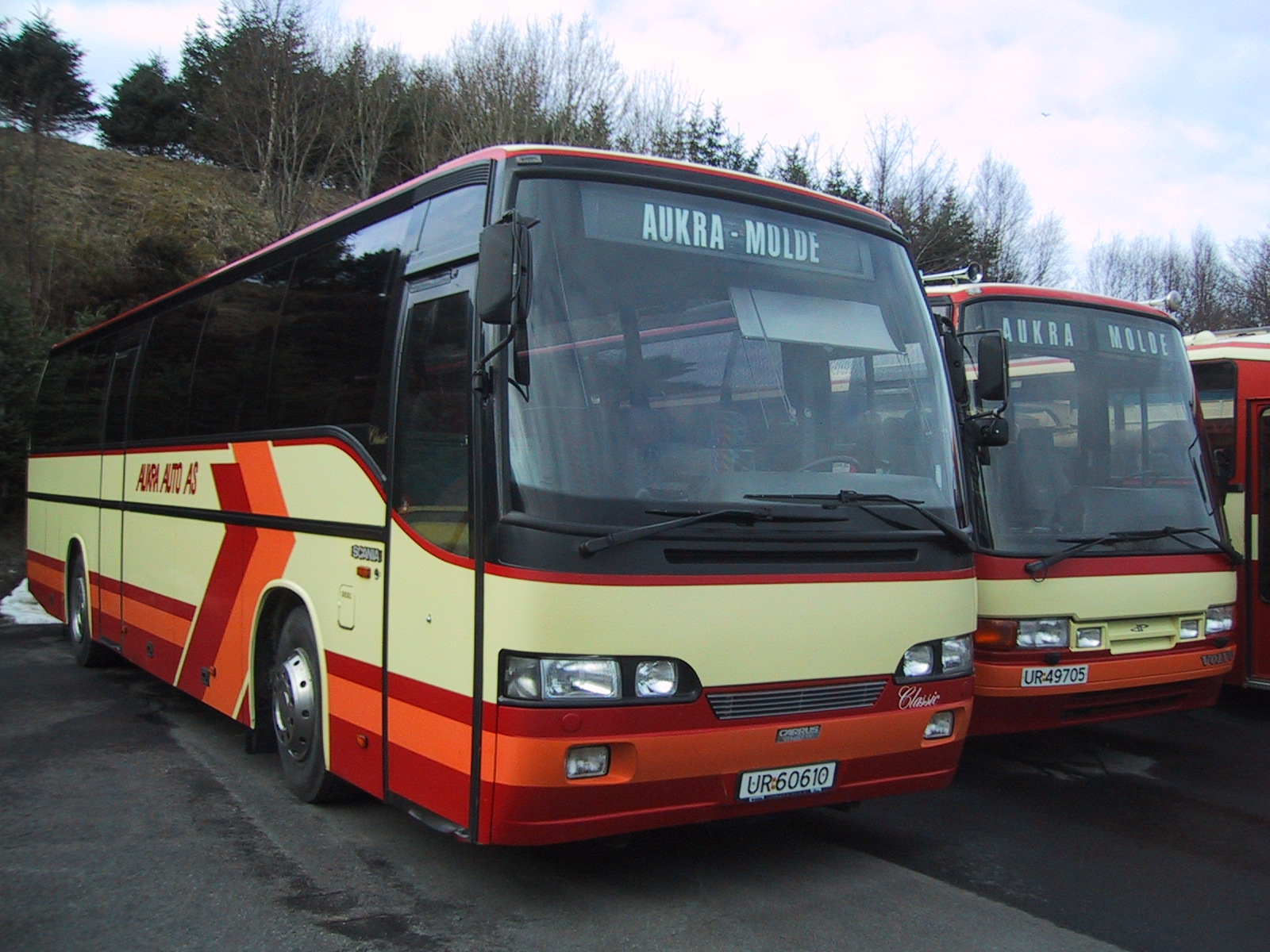
- Company type: Private
- Industry: Transport
- Founded: 1948
- Headquarters: Aukra Municipality, Norway
- Area served: Møre og Romsdal, Norway
- Parent: Nettbuss
- Website: www.aukraauto.no

Aukra Auto is a bus and truck operating company based in Aukra Municipality, Norway. The company has a monopoly on bus transport on the island of Gossa and between the island and the nearby town of Molde. The largest owner of the company is Nettbuss (66%).

Their Aerobus transports people and goods daily between Aukra and Molde. The company also runs its Aerobus between Molde Lufthavn, the town center and Aukra. The Aerobus has belts on all seats, offers a refrigerating unit and thermo cabinets.

In connection with the construction work on Ormen Lange, Aukra Auto has signed a contract with the county administration of Møre og Romsdal and Norsk Hydro to operate an airport bus to Molde Airport, Årø and internal transport on the site.
