= Merchant bank =

Deals in commercial loans and investment

A merchant bank is historically a bank dealing in commercial loans and investment. In modern British usage, it is the same as an investment bank. Merchant banks were the first modern banks and evolved from medieval merchants who traded in commodities, particularly cloth merchants. Historically, merchant banks' purpose was to facilitate or finance the production and trade of commodities, hence the name merchant. Few banks today restrict their activities to such a narrow scope.

In modern usage in the United States, the term additionally has taken on a more narrow meaning, and refers to a financial institution providing capital to companies in form of share ownership instead of loans. A merchant bank also provides advice on corporate matters to the firms in which they invest.

== History ==
Merchant banks were the first modern banks. They emerged in the Middle Ages from the Italian grain and cloth merchants community and started to develop in the 11th century during the large European fair of St. Giles (England), then at the Champagne fairs (France). As the Lombardy merchants and bankers grew in stature based on the strength of the Lombard plains cereal crops, many displaced Jews fleeing Spanish persecution were attracted to the trade.

The Florentine merchant banking community was exceptionally active and propagated new finance practices all over Europe. Both Jews and Florentine merchants perfected ancient practices used in the Middle East trade routes and the Far East silk routes. Originally intended for the finance of long trading journeys, these methods were applied to finance the medieval Commercial Revolution.

Jews entered the great trading piazzas and halls of Lombardy, alongside the local traders, and set up their benches to trade in crops. They had one great advantage over the locals. Christians were strictly forbidden from any kind of lending at interest, since such activities were equated with the sin of usury. Jewish law disallowed usury among Jews, but not when the borrower was Gentile.

The Jewish newcomers could lend to farmers against crops in the field, a high-risk loan at what would have been considered usurious rates by the Church; but the Jews were not subject to the Church's dictates. In this way they could secure the grain-sale rights against the eventual harvest. They then began to advance payment against the future delivery of grain shipped to distant ports. In both cases, they made their profit from the present discount against the future price. This two-handed trade was time-consuming and soon there arose a class of merchants who were trading grain debt instead of grain.

The court Jew performed both financing (credit) and underwriting (insurance) functions. Financing took the form of a farmer obtaining a crop loan at the beginning of the growing season, which allowed a farmer to develop and manufacture (through seeding, growing, weeding, and harvesting) his annual crop. Underwriting in the form of a crop, or commodity, insurance guaranteed the delivery of the crop to its buyer, typically a merchant wholesaler. Traders performed the merchant function by making arrangements to supply the buyer of the crop through alternative sources—grain stores or alternate markets, for instance—in the event of crop failure. He could also keep the farmer (or other commodity producer) in business during a drought or other crop failure, through the issuance of a crop (or commodity) insurance against the hazard of failure of his crop.

Merchant banking progressed from financing trade on one's own behalf to settling trades for others and then to holding deposits for settlement of "billette" or notes written by the people who were still brokering the actual grain. And so the merchant's "benches" (bank is derived from the Italian for bench, banco, as in a counter) in the great grain markets became centers for holding money against a bill (billette, a note, a letter of formal exchange, later a bill of exchange and later still a cheque).

These deposited funds were intended to be held for the settlement of grain trades, but often were used for the bench's own trades in the meantime. The term bankrupt is a corruption of the Italian banca rotta, or broken bench, which is what happened when someone lost his traders' deposits. Being "broke" has the same connotation.

A sensible manner of discounting interest to the depositors against what could be earned by employing their money in the trade of the bench soon developed; in short, selling an "interest" to them in a specific trade, thus overcoming the usury objection. Once again this merely developed what was an ancient method of financing long-distance transport of goods.

The medieval Italian markets were disrupted by wars and in any case were limited by the fractured nature of the Italian states. And so the next generation of bankers arose from migrant Jewish merchants in the great wheat-growing areas of Germany and Poland. Many of these merchants were from the same families who had been part of the development of the banking process in Italy. They also had links with family members who had, centuries before, fled Spain for both Italy and England.

As non-agricultural wealth expanded, many families of goldsmiths, another business not prohibited to Jews, also gradually moved into banking. This course of events set the stage for the rise of Jewish family banking firms whose names still resonate today, such as Warburgs and Rothschilds.

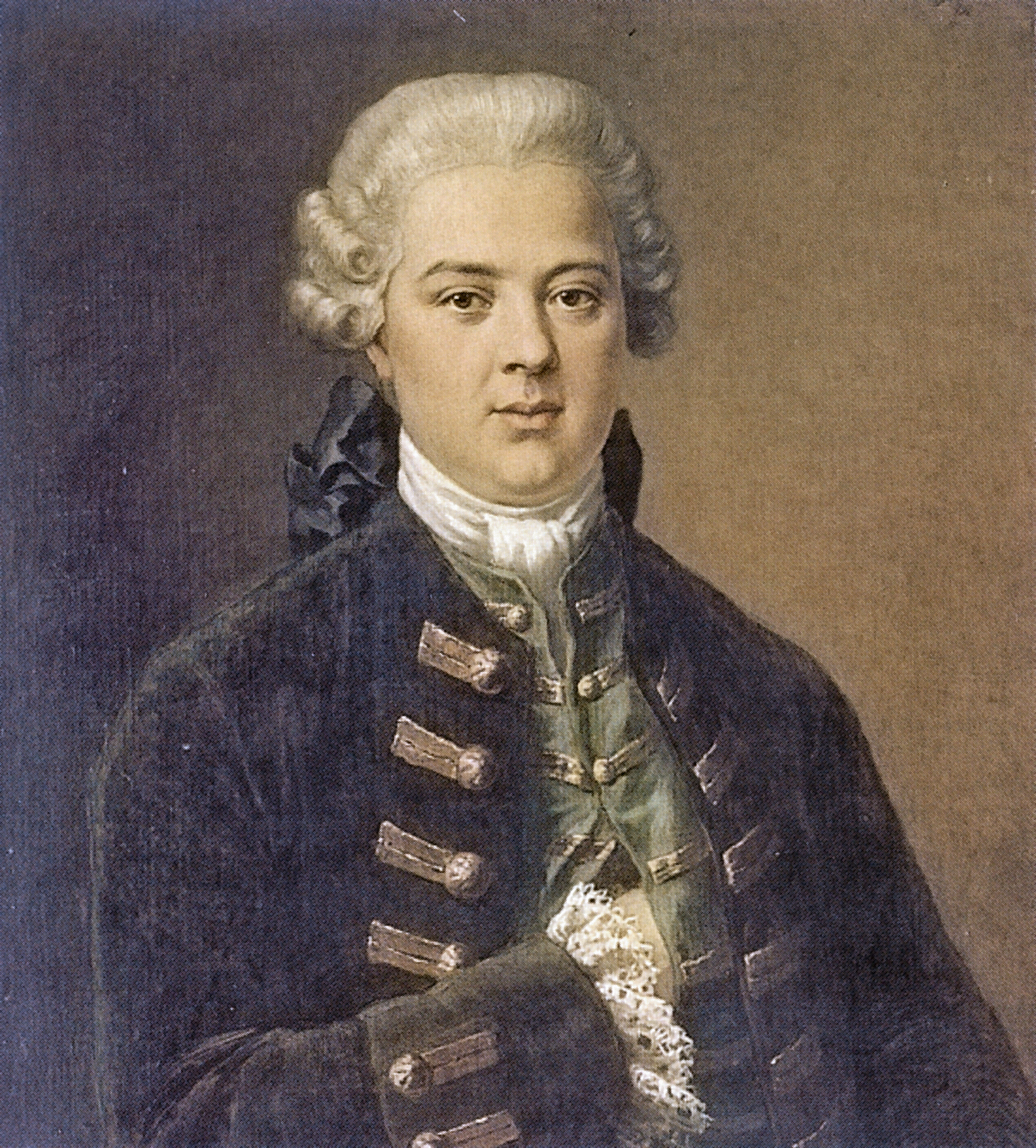
Johann Hinrich Gossler, a prominent Hamburg merchant banker of the 18th century

The rise of Protestantism freed many European Christians from Rome's dictates against usury. In the late 18th century, Protestant merchant families began to move into banking to an increasing degree, especially in trading countries such as the United Kingdom (Barings), Germany (Schroders, Berenbergs) and the Netherlands (Hope & Co., Gülcher & Mulder).

At the same time, new types of financial activities broadened the scope of banking far beyond its origins. The merchant-banking families dealt in everything from underwriting bonds to originating foreign loans. For instance, bullion trading and bond issuance were two of the specialties of the Rothschilds. In 1803, Barings teamed with Hope & Co. to facilitate the Louisiana Purchase.

In the 19th century, the rise of trade and industry in the US led to powerful new private merchant banks, culminating in J.P. Morgan & Co.. In the 20th century, the financial world began to outgrow the resources of family-owned and other forms of private-equity banking. Corporations came to dominate the banking business. For the same reasons, merchant banking activities became just one area of interest for modern banks.

Here is a list of merchant banks of the past and present:

- Barings Bank
- Berenberg Bank
- Bethmann Bank
- BDT Capital Partners
- N. M. Rothschild & Sons
- George Peabody & Co.
- Kleinwort Benson
- Kempen & Co
- Guinness Mahon
- Schroders
- J.P. Morgan
- Lazard & Cie
- SG Warburg
- Hope & Co.
- Defoe Fournier & Cie.
- Close Brothers
- Morgan Grenfell & Co.
- Greenhill & Co.
- Guggenheim Partners
- Robert Fleming & Co.
- Kuhn, Loeb & Co.
- Hambros Bank
- Hill Samuel
- Brown, Shipley & Co.
- Brown Brothers Harriman & Co.
- Samuel Montagu & Co.
- H. J. Merck & Co.
- Arbuthnot Latham & Co.
- Rothschild & Co.

== Modern practices ==
Known as "accepting and issuing houses" in the UK and "investment banks" in the US, modern merchant banks offer a wide range of activities, including Issue management, portfolio management, credit syndication, acceptance credit, counsel on mergers and acquisitions, and insurance.

Of the two classes of merchant banks, the US variant initiates loans and then sells them to investors. These investors can be private investment firms. Even though some of these companies call themselves "merchant banks", they have few, if any, of the characteristics of former merchant banks.

== Usage in the United States ==
Today, according to the US Federal Deposit Insurance Corporation (FDIC), "the term merchant banking is generally understood to mean negotiated private equity investment by financial institutions in the unregistered securities of either privately or publicly held companies." Both commercial banks and investment banks may engage in merchant banking activities.

In 2016, the Federal Reserve proposed a ban on merchant banking as part of a "take no risk" regulation strategy.

== See also ==
- Commercial bank
- Investment bank
- List of finance topics
- List of international trade topics
