= Bernhard Riksfjord =

Norwegian politician

Bernhard Riksfjord (born 10 January 1946) is a Norwegian politician for the Labour Party.

He served as a deputy representative to the Norwegian Parliament from Møre og Romsdal during the terms 1993–1997 and 1997–2001.

On the local level he is mayor of Aukra Municipality since 2007. He previously served as deputy mayor.
