= Gossa (island) =

Island in Møre og Romsdal, Norway

Gossa Gossen (dative case / historic spelling)
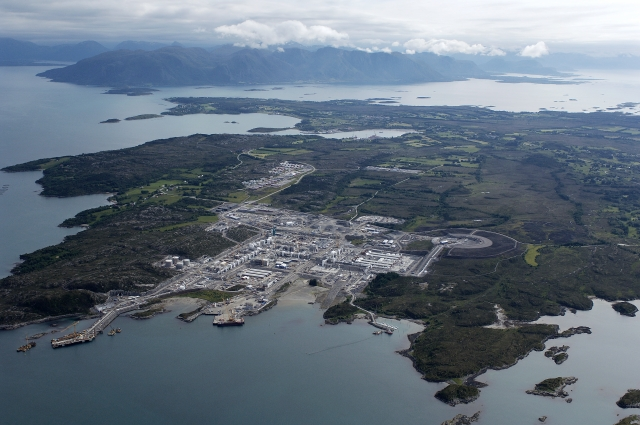
- View of the island
- Interactive map of Gossa; Gossen (dative case / historic spelling)

Geography
- Location: Møre og Romsdal, Norway
- Coordinates: 62.8183°N 6.8677°E
- Area: 46.5 km^{2} (18.0 sq mi)
- Length: 10.5 km (6.52 mi)
- Width: 11.5 km (7.15 mi)
- Highest elevation: 88 m (289 ft)
- Highest point: Jærmannburet

Administration
- Norway
- County: Møre og Romsdal
- Municipality: Aukra Municipality

Gossa is an island in Aukra Municipality in Møre og Romsdal county, Norway. The island encompasses most of the municipality and has a ferry connection from the village of Aukrasanden across the Julsundet strait to the village of Hollingen on the mainland. About 80% of the municipal population (about 2,500 people) is located on the island. The small island of Rindarøya lies just off the northwestern shore of Gossa. The two islands are connected by a bridge.

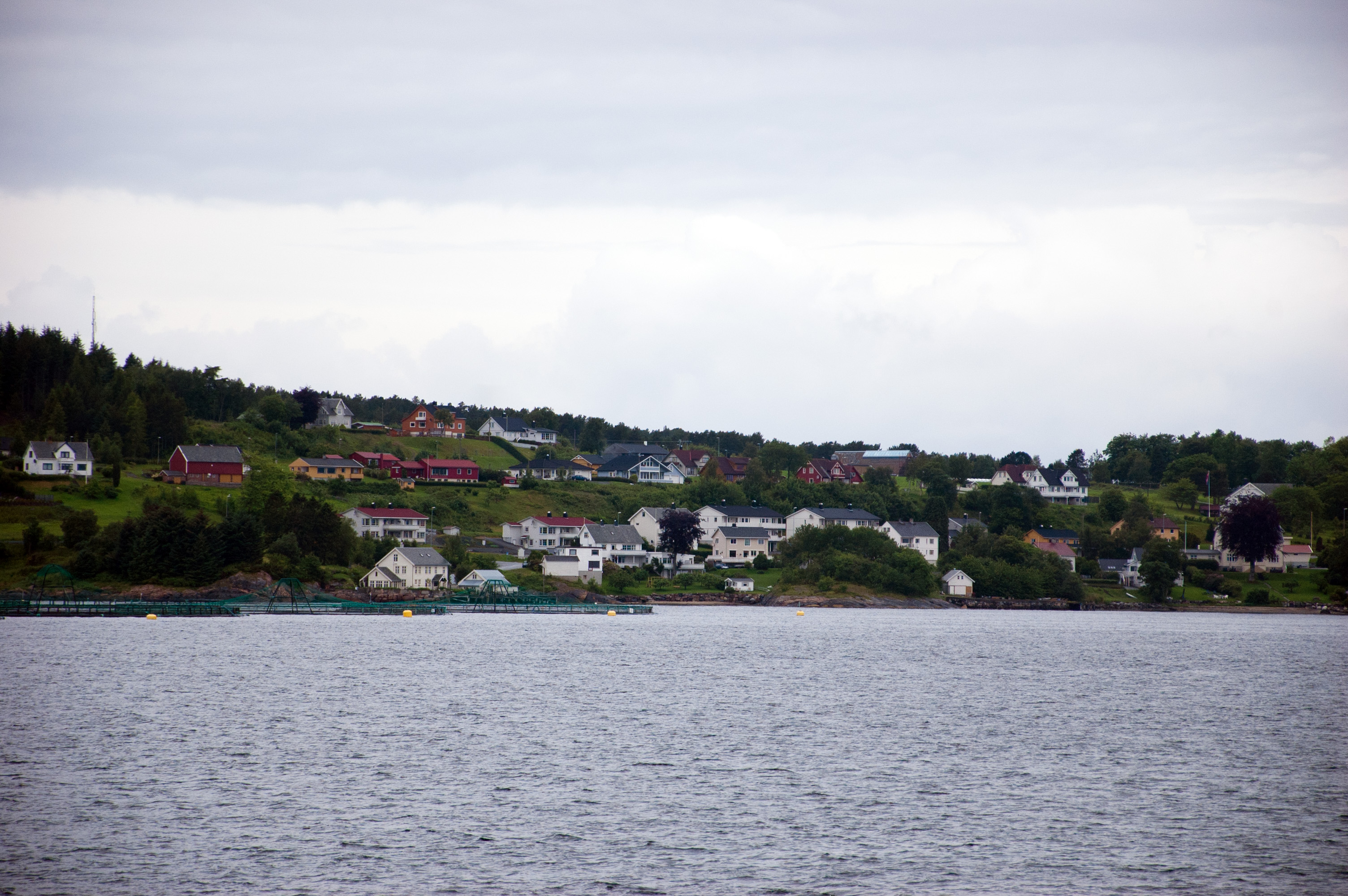
View of Aukrasanden village

The 46.5-square-kilometre (18.0 sq mi) island is flat and swampy, but it is well cultivated by farmland wherever possible. There are also some planted forests. The highest point on the island is the 99-metre (325 ft) tall Jærmannburet.

The largest population centers on the island are the villages of Aukrasanden and Varhaugvika on the southeastern side and the village of Røssøyvågen on the west side. Aukra Auto runs bus service on the island.

The natural gas from the Ormen Lange gas field is brought ashore at Nyhamna on the northeastern shore of the island. Here the gas is processed and pumped through the world's longest underwater pipeline, the Langeled pipeline, to Easington in the United Kingdom.

== See also ==
- List of islands of Norway
