= Nyhamna =

Peninsula in Aukra, Norway

- Peninsula
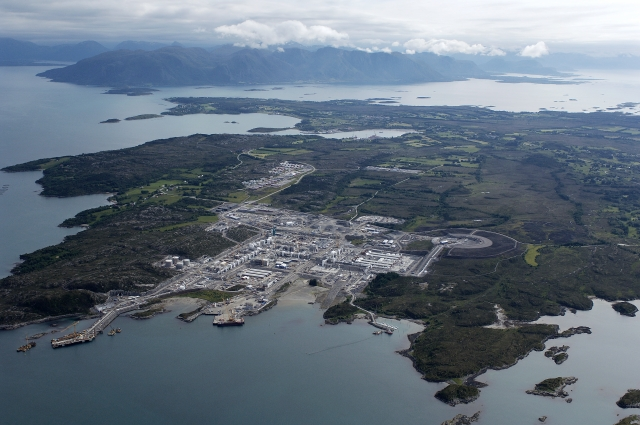
- View of Nyhamna and the gas pipeline terminal
- Interactive map of the peninsula
- Coordinates: 62.85126°N 6.95111°E
- Location: Møre og Romsdal, Norway

Nyhamna is a small peninsula on the northeast side of the island of Gossa in Aukra Municipality in Møre og Romsdal county, Norway. It is located along the Julsundet strait, about 7 kilometres (4.3 mi) northeast of the village of Varhaugvika and 10 kilometres (6.2 mi) northeast of the village of Aukrasanden.

The area was once a whaling station, but is now an industrial area. Since 2002, it has been the landing place of the natural gas from the Ormen Lange gas field. At this facility, the gas enters a processing facility, the Nyhamna Gas Plant that is connected to the northern end of the Langeled pipeline which transports the gas under the sea to Easington in England. The processing facility at Nyhamna processes about 20,000,000,000 cubic metres (4.8 mi^{3}) per year.
