= Aukra Municipality =

Municipality in Møre og Romsdal, Norway

Aukra Municipality Aukra kommune
- Municipality
- Nord-Aukra herred (historic name); Akerø herred (historic name)
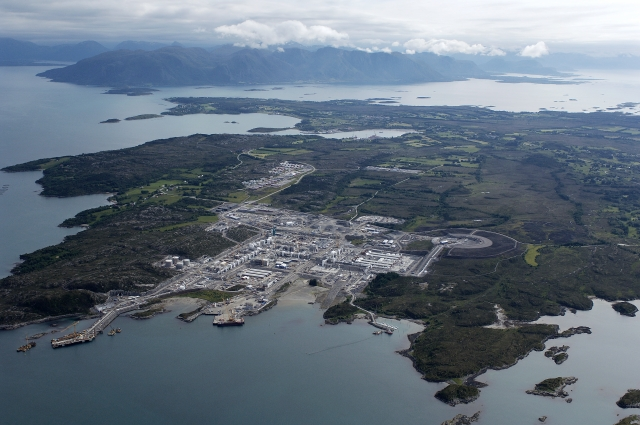
- View of the Ormen Lange facilities in Nyhamna

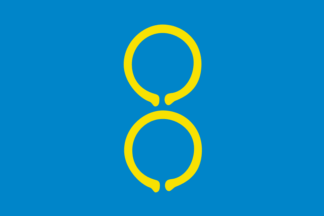
- Flag Coat of arms

- Møre og Romsdal within Norway

- Aukra within Møre og Romsdal
- Coordinates: 62°49′43″N 06°50′45″E
- Country: Norway
- County: Møre og Romsdal
- District: Romsdal
- Established: 1 Jan 1838
  - Created as: Formannskapsdistrikt
- Administrative centre: Falkhytta

Government
  - Mayor (2023): Helge Kjøll (KrF)

Area
  - Total: 60.66 km^{2} (23.42 sq mi)
  - Land: 60.57 km^{2} (23.39 sq mi)
  - Water: 0.09 km^{2} (0.035 sq mi) 0.1%
  - Rank: #346 in Norway
- Highest elevation: 492.73 m (1,616.6 ft)

Population (2024)
  - Total: 3,678
  - Rank: #212 in Norway
  - Density: 60.6/km^{2} (157/sq mi)
  - Change (10 years): ▲ +8.9%
- Demonym(s): Gossing; Aukraværing

Official language
  - Norwegian form: Nynorsk
- Time zone: UTC+01:00 (CET)
  - Summer (DST): UTC+02:00 (CEST)
- ISO 3166 code: NO-1547
- Website: Official website

Aukra is municipality in Møre og Romsdal county, Norway. It is part of the region of Romsdalen. The administrative centre is the village of Falkhytta, which is part of the Aukrasanden urban area.

The municipality is made up of the island of Gossa as well as many small surrounding islands (such as Rindarøya, plus a small area around the village of Hollingen across the Julsundet strait on the mainland Romsdal peninsula. Some of the main population centers include the villages of Hollingen, Aukrasanden, Varhaugvika, and Røssøyvågen. Nyhamna is a major industrial area in Aukra.

The 61-square-kilometre (24 sq mi) municipality is the 346th largest by area out of the 357 municipalities in Norway. Aukra Municipality is the 212th most populous municipality in Norway with a population of 3,678. The municipality's population density is 60.6 inhabitants per square kilometre (157/sq mi) and its population has increased by 8.9% over the previous 10-year period.

== General information ==
The municipality of Akerø was established on 1 January 1838 (see formannskapsdistrikt law). In 1840, most of Akerø on the Romsdal peninsula was separated to form the new Frænen Municipality. On 1 January 1867, the islands that are located to the west of Gossa (population: 601) were separated to become the new Sandøy Municipality. On 1 January 1924, the southern part of the municipality (Otrøya and several other islands) were separated to form the new Sør-Aukra Municipality, and the remainder of the municipality was renamed Nord-Aukra Municipality.

During the 1960s, there were many municipal mergers across Norway due to the work of the Schei Committee. On 1 January 1964, the Mordal area of Nord-Aukra (population: 77) was transferred to the neighboring Molde Municipality. On 1 January 1965, prefix Nord- was dropped from the name of the municipality, so it was then just called Aukra Municipality.

On 1 January 2020, the uninhabited islands of Lyngværet and the island of Orta (population: 11) were transferred from Sandøy Municipality to Aukra Municipality.

=== Name ===
The municipality (originally the parish) is named after the old Aukra farm (Old Norse: Aukrin) since the first Aukra Church was built there. The first element is akr which means "field" or "acre". The last element is vin which means "field" or "acre". Historically, the name of the municipality was spelled Agerø or Akerø. On 3 November 1917, a royal resolution changed the spelling of the name of the municipality to Aukra. On 1 January 1924, the municipality was renamed as Nord-Aukra Municipality (adding the prefix nord- which means "north") to distinguish it from the newly created Sør-Aukra Municipality (the prefix of that municipality was sør- meaning "south"). On 1 January 1965, the prefix nord- was dropped, bringing back the old name Aukra Municipality (the neighboring Sør-Aukra Municipality was merged with other areas and renamed Midsund Municipality so there was no need for the prefix in the name anymore).

=== Coat of arms ===
The coat of arms was granted on 22 May 1987. The official blazon is "Azure, two bracelets Or" (Norwegian: På blå grunn to gull ringar, 1-1). This means the arms have a blue field (background) and the charge is two Bronze Age bracelets. The charge has a tincture of Or which means it is commonly colored yellow, but if it is made out of metal, then gold is used. The bracelets are based on an archaeological finding of two bracelets in Aukra in 1936. The rings date back to the year 1000 BC, during the Bronze Age. There are no other such pairs found in Norway and only one somewhat similar in southern Sweden. The rings are 8 centimetres (3.1 in) in diameter and each one is made of 65 grams (2.3 oz) of gold. The rings thus symbolize the long tradition of habitation in the area. The fact that there are two, also symbolizes one for the island part of the municipality and the other for the mainland part. The blue and gold colors symbolize the sunset over the ocean. The arms were designed by Jarle Skuseth who based it off an idea by Knut Rød. The municipal flag has the same design as the coat of arms.

=== Churches ===
The Church of Norway has one parish (sokn) within Aukra Municipality. It is part of the Molde domprosti (arch-deanery) in the Diocese of Møre.

Churches in Aukra Municipality
Parish (sokn)	Church name	Location of the church	Year built
Aukra	Aukra Church	Aukrasanden	1835

== History ==
Aukra is the site of a shipwreck and rescue operation, when the cargo ship Rokta on 4 April 1938. The monument of Rokta is situated on Rindarøya island with a view of Galleskjæra where the Rokta sank.

== Geography ==
The island of Gossa makes up the majority of the municipality with a small area located on the mainland Romsdal Peninsula. There are also many very small surrounding islands and skerries, including Rindarøya. The highest point in the municipality is the 492.73-metre (1,616.6 ft) tall mountain Eiskremheia which is located on the mainland, along the border with Molde Municipality. Hustadvika Municipality is located to the north and east (across the Julsundet strait), Molde Municipality is located to the south, and Ålesund Municipality is located to the west (this is a group of islands which is an exclave from the rest of Ålesund).

== Government ==
Aukra Municipality is responsible for primary education (through 10th grade), outpatient health services, senior citizen services, welfare and other social services, zoning, economic development, and municipal roads and utilities. The municipality is governed by a municipal council of directly elected representatives. The mayor is indirectly elected by a vote of the municipal council. The municipality is under the jurisdiction of the Nordmøre og Romsdal District Court and the Frostating Court of Appeal. Waste management is provided by the inter-municipal agency Romsdalshalvøya Interkommunale Renovasjonsselskap.

=== Municipal council ===
The municipal council (Kommunestyre) of Aukra Municipality is made up of 21 representatives that are elected to four year terms. The tables below show the current and historical composition of the council by political party.

Aukra kommunestyre 2023–2027
Party name (in Nynorsk)	Number of representatives
Labour Party (Arbeidarpartiet)	3
Progress Party (Framstegspartiet)	6
Christian Democratic Party (Kristeleg Folkeparti)	7
Centre Party (Senterpartiet)	3
Liberal Party (Venstre)	2
Total number of members:	21

Aukra kommunestyre 2019–2023
Party name (in Nynorsk)	Number of representatives
Labour Party (Arbeidarpartiet)	5
Progress Party (Framstegspartiet)	1
Conservative Party (Høgre)	5
Christian Democratic Party (Kristeleg Folkeparti)	4
Centre Party (Senterpartiet)	4
Socialist Left Party (Sosialistisk Venstreparti)	1
Liberal Party (Venstre)	1
Total number of members:	21

Aukra kommunestyre 2015–2019
Party name (in Nynorsk)	Number of representatives
Labour Party (Arbeidarpartiet)	7
Progress Party (Framstegspartiet)	1
Conservative Party (Høgre)	5
Christian Democratic Party (Kristeleg Folkeparti)	3
Centre Party (Senterpartiet)	2
Liberal Party (Venstre)	2
Aukra List (Aukralista)	1
Total number of members:	21

Aukra kommunestyre 2011–2015
Party name (in Nynorsk)	Number of representatives
Labour Party (Arbeidarpartiet)	7
Progress Party (Framstegspartiet)	2
Conservative Party (Høgre)	3
Christian Democratic Party (Kristeleg Folkeparti)	3
Centre Party (Senterpartiet)	1
Socialist Left Party (Sosialistisk Venstreparti)	1
Liberal Party (Venstre)	1
Aukra List (Aukralista)	3
Total number of members:	21

Aukra kommunestyre 2007–2011
Party name (in Nynorsk)	Number of representatives
Labour Party (Arbeidarpartiet)	5
Progress Party (Framstegspartiet)	4
Conservative Party (Høgre)	3
Christian Democratic Party (Kristeleg Folkeparti)	4
Centre Party (Senterpartiet)	2
Socialist Left Party (Sosialistisk Venstreparti)	1
Liberal Party (Venstre)	2
Total number of members:	21

Aukra kommunestyre 2003–2007
Party name (in Nynorsk)	Number of representatives
Labour Party (Arbeidarpartiet)	4
Progress Party (Framstegspartiet)	2
Conservative Party (Høgre)	3
Christian Democratic Party (Kristeleg Folkeparti)	7
Centre Party (Senterpartiet)	1
Socialist Left Party (Sosialistisk Venstreparti)	2
Liberal Party (Venstre)	2
Total number of members:	21

Aukra kommunestyre 1999–2003
Party name (in Nynorsk)	Number of representatives
Labour Party (Arbeidarpartiet)	5
Conservative Party (Høgre)	3
Christian Democratic Party (Kristeleg Folkeparti)	6
Centre Party (Senterpartiet)	4
Socialist Left Party (Sosialistisk Venstreparti)	1
Liberal Party (Venstre)	2
Total number of members:	21

Aukra kommunestyre 1995–1999
Party name (in Nynorsk)	Number of representatives
Labour Party (Arbeidarpartiet)	5
Conservative Party (Høgre)	2
Christian Democratic Party (Kristeleg Folkeparti)	4
Centre Party (Senterpartiet)	7
Socialist Left Party (Sosialistisk Venstreparti)	1
Liberal Party (Venstre)	2
Total number of members:	21

Aukra kommunestyre 1991–1995
Party name (in Nynorsk)	Number of representatives
Labour Party (Arbeidarpartiet)	4
Conservative Party (Høgre)	3
Christian Democratic Party (Kristeleg Folkeparti)	4
Centre Party (Senterpartiet)	6
Socialist Left Party (Sosialistisk Venstreparti)	2
Liberal Party (Venstre)	2
Total number of members:	21

Aukra kommunestyre 1987–1991
Party name (in Nynorsk)	Number of representatives
Labour Party (Arbeidarpartiet)	7
Conservative Party (Høgre)	5
Christian Democratic Party (Kristeleg Folkeparti)	4
Centre Party (Senterpartiet)	2
Liberal Party (Venstre)	3
Total number of members:	21

Aukra kommunestyre 1983–1987
Party name (in Nynorsk)	Number of representatives
Labour Party (Arbeidarpartiet)	7
Conservative Party (Høgre)	3
Christian Democratic Party (Kristeleg Folkeparti)	5
Centre Party (Senterpartiet)	3
Liberal Party (Venstre)	3
Total number of members:	21

Aukra kommunestyre 1979–1983
Party name (in Nynorsk)	Number of representatives
Labour Party (Arbeidarpartiet)	4
Conservative Party (Høgre)	4
Christian Democratic Party (Kristeleg Folkeparti)	5
Centre Party (Senterpartiet)	4
Liberal Party (Venstre)	2
Total number of members:	19

Aukra kommunestyre 1975–1979
Party name (in Nynorsk)	Number of representatives
Labour Party (Arbeidarpartiet)	3
Conservative Party (Høgre)	1
Christian Democratic Party (Kristeleg Folkeparti)	5
Centre Party (Senterpartiet)	5
Liberal Party (Venstre)	2
Non-party list (Upolitisk Liste)	3
Total number of members:	19

Aukra kommunestyre 1971–1975
Party name (in Nynorsk)	Number of representatives
Labour Party (Arbeidarpartiet)	4
Conservative Party (Høgre)	1
Christian Democratic Party (Kristeleg Folkeparti)	5
Centre Party (Senterpartiet)	6
Liberal Party (Venstre)	3
Total number of members:	19

Aukra kommunestyre 1967–1971
Party name (in Nynorsk)	Number of representatives
Labour Party (Arbeidarpartiet)	5
Conservative Party (Høgre)	1
Christian Democratic Party (Kristeleg Folkeparti)	5
Centre Party (Senterpartiet)	4
Liberal Party (Venstre)	4
Total number of members:	19

Nord-Aukra heradsstyre 1963–1967
Party name (in Nynorsk)	Number of representatives
Labour Party (Arbeidarpartiet)	4
Christian Democratic Party (Kristeleg Folkeparti)	4
Centre Party (Senterpartiet)	4
Local List(s) (Lokale lister)	5
Total number of members:	17
Note: The municipal name was changed from Nord-Aukra to Aukra on 1 January 1965.

Nord-Aukra heradsstyre 1959–1963
Party name (in Nynorsk)	Number of representatives
Labour Party (Arbeidarpartiet)	3
Christian Democratic Party (Kristeleg Folkeparti)	4
Local List(s) (Lokale lister)	10
Total number of members:	17

Nord-Aukra heradsstyre 1955–1959
Party name (in Nynorsk)	Number of representatives
Labour Party (Arbeidarpartiet)	3
Christian Democratic Party (Kristeleg Folkeparti)	4
Local List(s) (Lokale lister)	10
Total number of members:	17

Nord-Aukra heradsstyre 1951–1955
Party name (in Nynorsk)	Number of representatives
Labour Party (Arbeidarpartiet)	3
Local List(s) (Lokale lister)	13
Total number of members:	16

Nord-Aukra heradsstyre 1947–1951
Party name (in Nynorsk)	Number of representatives
Labour Party (Arbeidarpartiet)	2
Local List(s) (Lokale lister)	14
Total number of members:	16

Nord-Aukra heradsstyre 1945–1947
Party name (in Nynorsk)	Number of representatives
Labour Party (Arbeidarpartiet)	4
Christian Democratic Party (Kristeleg Folkeparti)	1
Local List(s) (Lokale lister)	11
Total number of members:	16

Nord-Aukra heradsstyre 1937–1941*
Party name (in Nynorsk)	Number of representatives
Labour Party (Arbeidarpartiet)	2
Local List(s) (Lokale lister)	14
Total number of members:	16
Note: Due to the German occupation of Norway during World War II, no elections were held for new municipal councils until after the war ended in 1945.

=== Mayors ===
The mayor (Nynorsk: ordførar) of Aukra Municipality is the political leader of the municipality and the chairperson of the municipal council. Here is a list of people who have held this position:

- 1838–1839: Nils Andersen Flaae
- 1840–1842: J. Knutsen Tauterø
- 1842–1843: Hans Hansen Hegdal
- 1843–1851: Elling Nilsen Heggdal
- 1852–1855: Rasmus Reiten
- 1856–1863: Elling Nilsen Heggdal
- 1864–1865: Andreas K. Haukebø
- 1866–1869: Rasmus Reiten
- 1870–1871: Lars C. Haukebø
- 1872–1873: Ingebrigt Smaage
- 1874–1875: Anton Riksfjord
- 1876–1878: Andreas K. Haukebø
- 1879–1885: Rasmus Reiten
- 1886–1891: Peter Olaus Arnesen Sæter
- 1892–1893: Knut N. Rakvaag
- 1894–1895: Peter Olaus Arnesen Sæter
- 1896–1901: Knut N. Rakvaag
- 1902–1907: Johan Magnus Antonsen Riksfjord
- 1907–1910: Peter Olaus Arnesen Sæter
- 1911–1916: Johan Hollen
- 1917–1925: Kristian Småge
- 1925–1931: Arne P. Stafseth
- 1931–1932: Ole Berg
- 1932–1941: Ole K. Hukkelberg
- 1945–1947: Ivar Kornelius Eikrem (Ap)
- 1947–1963: Knut Orø (LL)
- 1963–1967: Johan P. Viggen (V)
- 1967–1979: Johan I. Eikrem (KrF)
- 1979–1991: Kristian Rød Dy (KrF)
- 1991–1999: Andreas Horrem (Sp)
- 1999–2007: Aud Mork (KrF)
- 2007–2019: Bernhard Riksfjord (Ap)
- 2019–2023: Odd Jørgen Nilssen (H)
- 2023–present: Helge Kjøll (KrF)

== Economy ==
The Nyhamna industrial area on the northeastern part of the island of Gossa in Aukra is the location from where the Langeled pipeline, transporting natural gas from the enormous Ormen Lange gas field to the United Kingdom, came onstream in 2007.

Aukra Auto runs the bus service on the island of Gossa.

== Notable people ==
- Jonas Danilssønn Ramus (1649 in Aukra - 1718), a priest, author, and historian
- Anton Beinset (1894 in Aukra – 1963), a journalist, newspaper editor, short story writer, crime fiction writer, and politician
- Iver Horrem (born 1977 in Aukra), a professional beach volleyball player
- Emilie Nautnes (born 1999 in Aukra), a footballer who plays for the Norway women's national football team

== Gallery ==
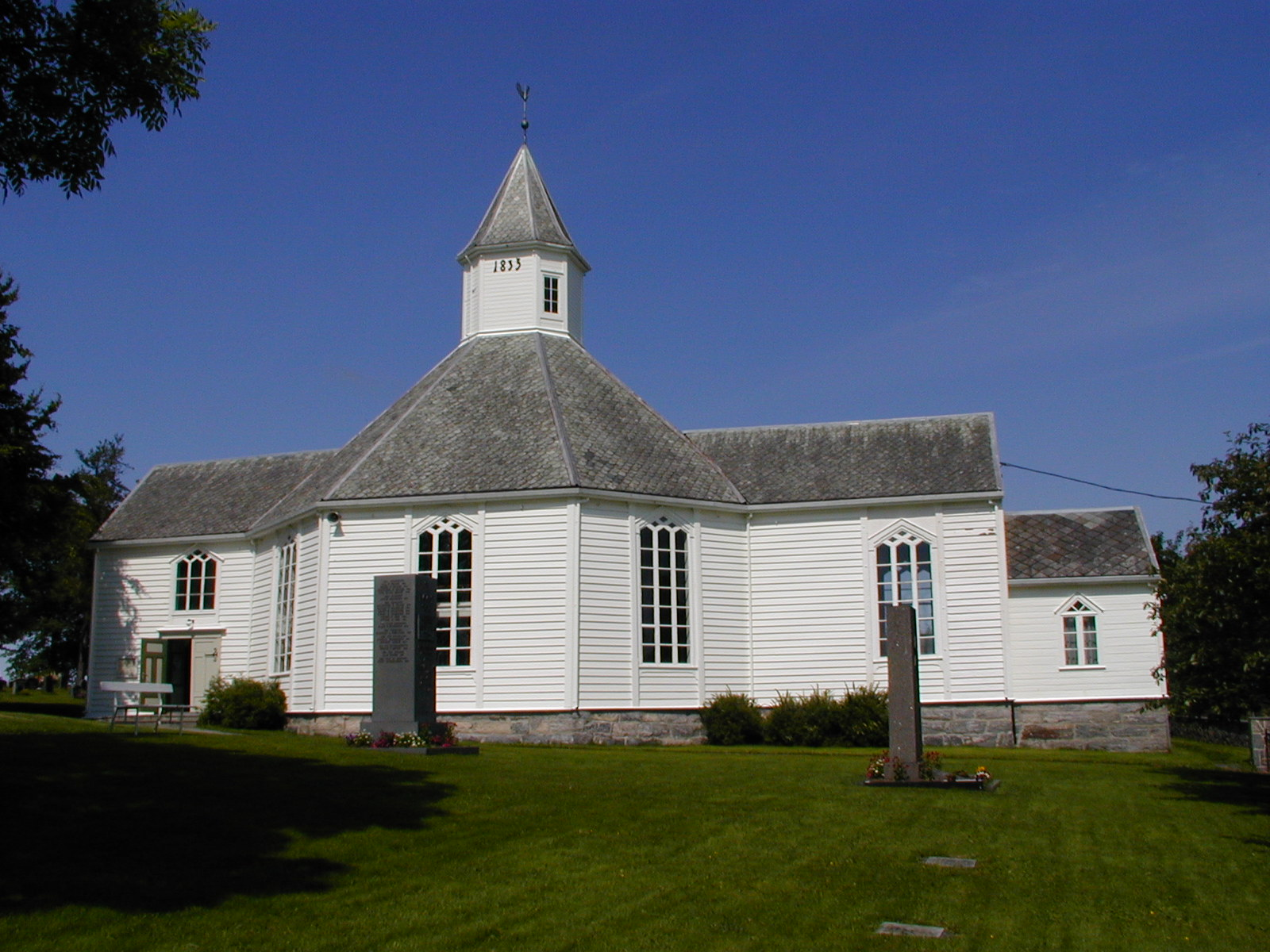
Aukra kirke

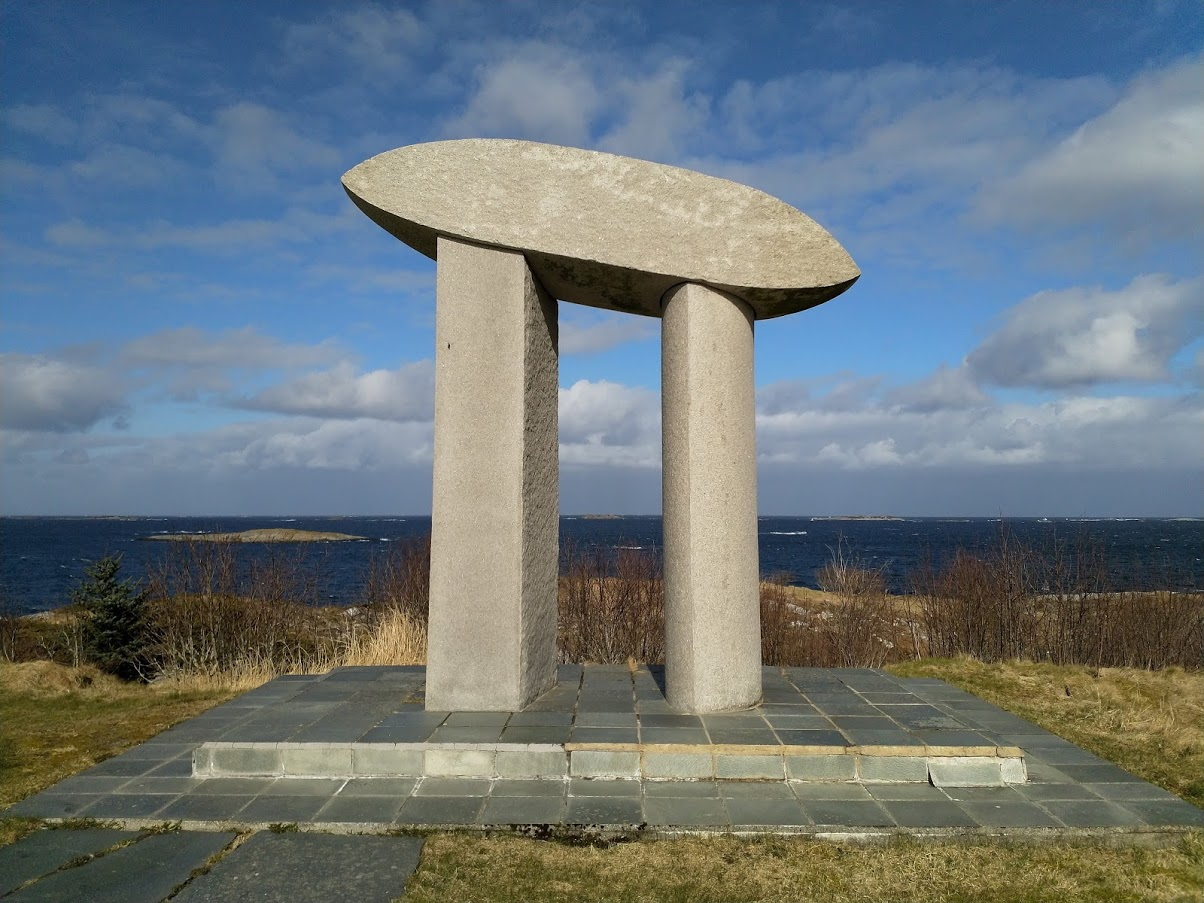
Roktabautaen

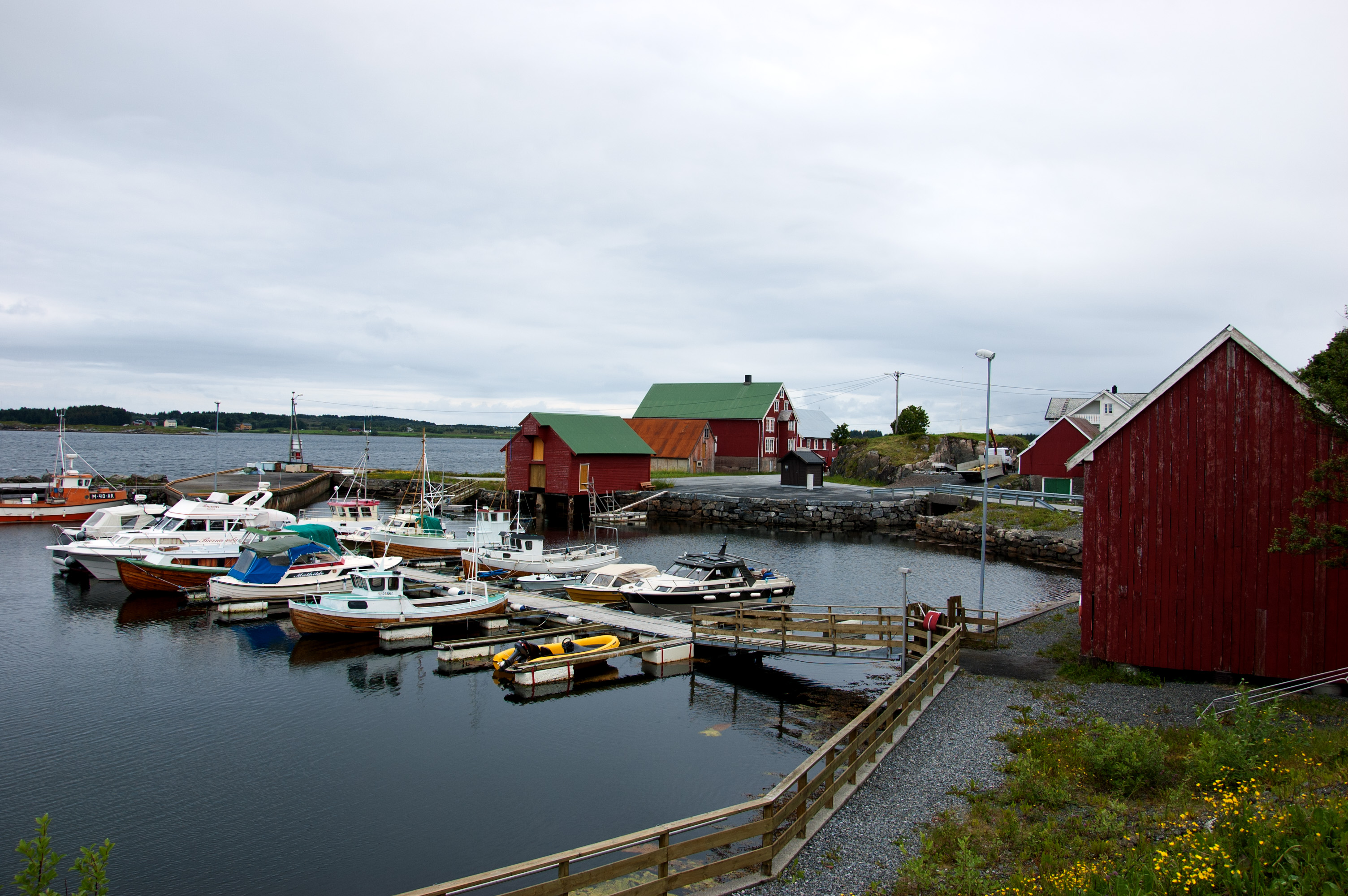
Røssøyvågen on Gossen island, Aukra

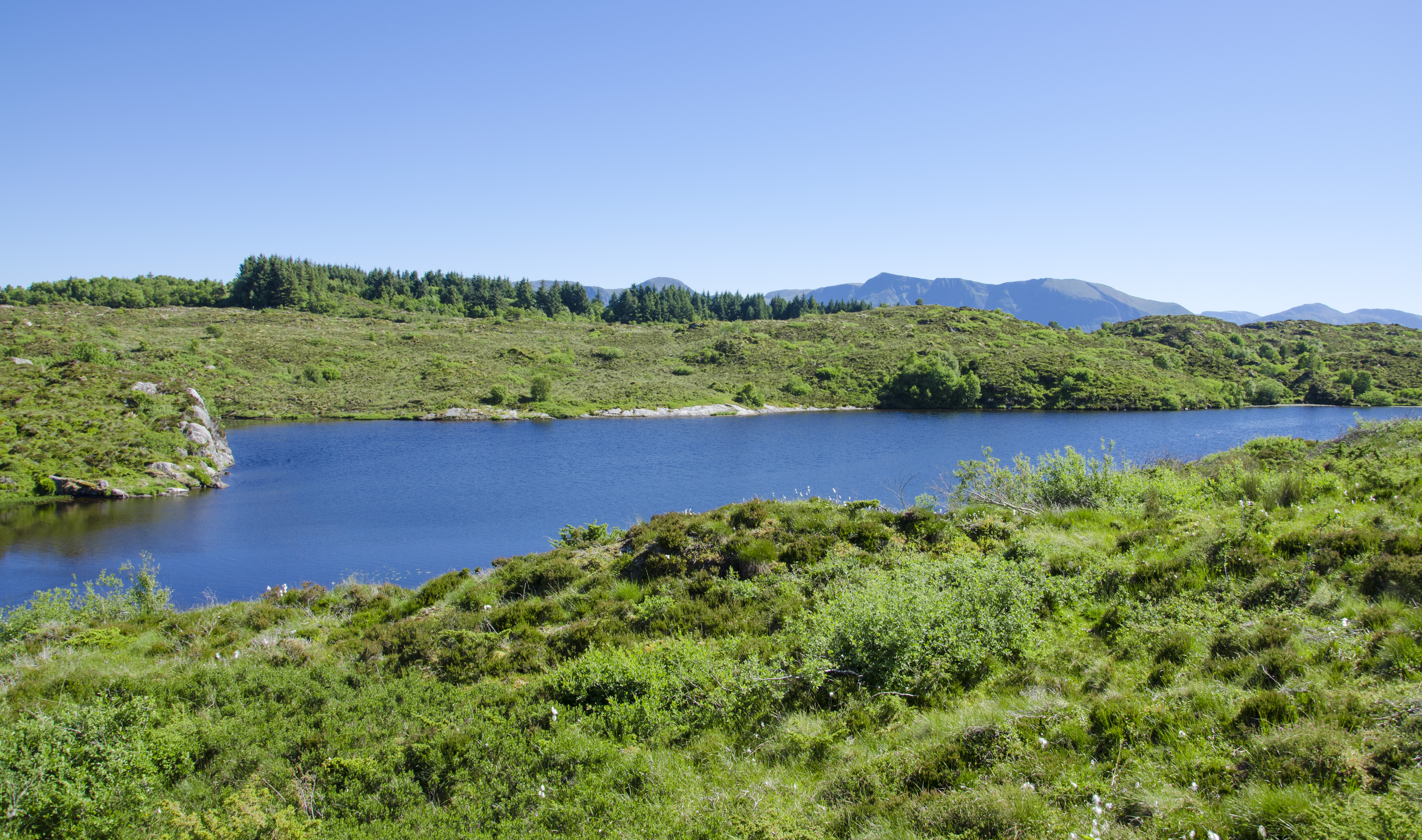
Smågevatnet Gossen
