= Rindarøya =

Island in Møre og Romsdal, Norway

- Interactive map of Rindarøya

Geography
- Location: Møre og Romsdal, Norway
- Coordinates: 62.84547°N 6.77023°E
- Area: 18 ha (44 acres)

Administration
- Norway
- County: Møre og Romsdal
- Municipality: Aukra Municipality

Rindarøya is a small island in Aukra Municipality in Møre og Romsdal county, Norway. The 18-hectare (44-acre) island lies just off the northwest coast of the larger island of Gossa. The island is connected to Gossa by a causeway and bridge.

== Roktabautaen ==
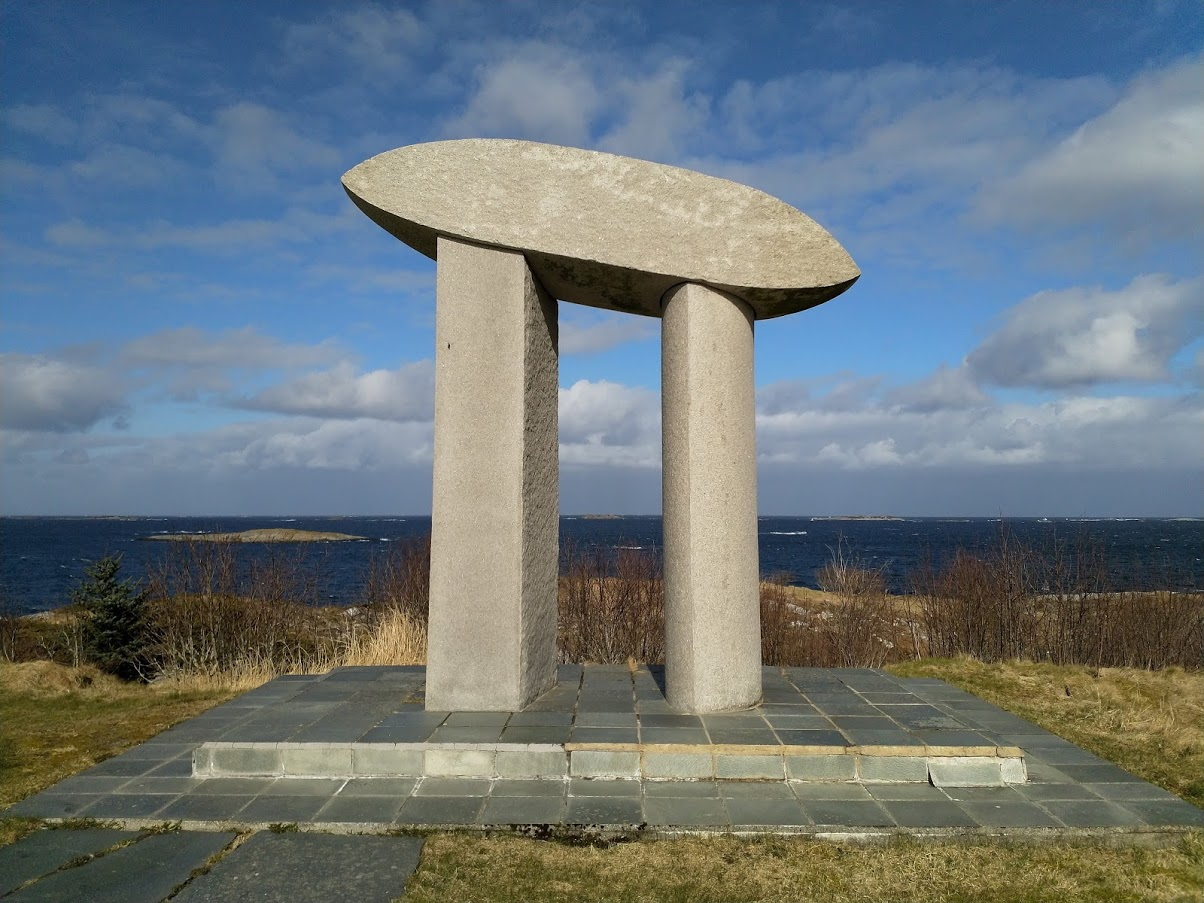
View of the Roktabautaen

Rindarøya is the site of a shipwreck and rescue operation, when the cargo ship Rokta on 4 April 1938. The lifeboat had a radio on board and the rescue operations were transmitted direct. Half of the 12-man crew were saved. Arnulf Øverland immortalised the rescue in his poem "The fishermen from Hustadvika". The memorial monument of Rokta is situated on the island with a view of Galleskjæra where the Rokta sank.

== See also ==
- List of islands of Norway
