= Humber Gas Tunnel =

Natural gas pipeline tunnel in Northern England

- Interactive map of Humber Gas Tunnel

Overview
- Location: Lincolnshire; East Riding of Yorkshire
- Coordinates: 53.701°N 0.242°W
- Status: Open
- Crosses: Humber Estuary
- Start: Paull (northern end) (Note: Start and end defined by direction in which the gas flows.)
- End: Goxhill (southern end)

Operation
- Work began: 6 April 2018
- Constructed: 6 April 2018–10 September 2019
- Opened: December 2020
- Owner: National Gas
- Operator: National Gas
- Traffic: Natural gas

Technical
- Design engineer: Skanska; A Hak; Porr
- Length: 4.9 kilometres (3 mi)
- Depth below water: 30 metres (98 ft)

The Humber Gas Tunnel is a natural gas-carrying pipeline that runs underneath the Humber Estuary between Paull in the East Riding of Yorkshire, and Goxhill in Lincolnshire, England. The project was started in April 2018, and the pipeline was used to transport gas for the first time in December 2020. It is designed to carry 20% of the gas used in the United Kingdom, and is a crucial feeder pipeline to carry gas to the south of England. It is the longest pipe in a tunnel in Europe, and due to being inserted into the tunnel that was deliberately flooded with water, it is the longest hydraulically inserted gas pipeline in the world.

== History ==
In 2009, underwater surveys revealed that the pipeline carrying natural gas between Easington and the south side of the Humber Estuary was at risk of being damaged. The Humber Estuary is the fourth-largest estuary in Great Britain, and the third busiest in terms of shipping. The former pipeline, which was constructed in 1984, was trench-laid on the floor of the estuary, and whilst it was still safe, it was listed on National Grid's "Vulnerable Infrastructure Register", as it was prone to tidal erosion and "third-party impact, both of which could result in catastrophic failure of the pipeline." Although remedial work was undertaken in 2010 and 2012, because the pipeline feeds up to 20% of gas into the National Transmission System (NTS), a replacement project was devised to enable security of supply. The River Humber Gas Pipeline Replacement Order 2016, was approved in 2016, which gave authority for the National Grid to build a replacement pipe and all ancillary works.

The new pipeline would be buried underneath the river in a specially constructed tunnel, and would run parallel to the old pipeline from Paull in the north east to Goxhill in the south west. This would then connect to the existing pipeline to Hatton compressor station in Lincolnshire, which in turn supplies gas to the south of England. A 160-metre (520 ft) tunnel boring machine (TBM), christened Mary, (Note: The TBM is named after Mary Fergusson, the first female president of the Institution of Civil Engineers (ICE).) started running north eastwards from Goxhill in Lincolnshire in April 2018. The TBM reached Paull in the East Riding of Yorkshire, 18 months later. The TBM had a diameter of 4.38 metres (14.4 ft), which allowed for the concrete casing to be inserted on the walls of the new tunnel which consisted of rhomboidal and trapezoidal precast concrete segments 225 millimetres (8.9 in) thick, and 1.2 metres (3 ft 11 in) in length. The chalk slurry dug from the chalk beds underneath the Humber was treated and used to remediate a former chalk quarry at Goxhill. The material excavated as part of the tunnelling process was mostly chalk, having dug through the Burnham Chalk and Flamborough Chalk Formations, but with glacial deposits at the north bank near Paull. The pipe is horizontal below the estuary, but the down gradients at each portal are at an incline of 4% for 450 metres (1,480 ft) at Paull, and 650 metres (2,130 ft) at Goxhill.

The pipe was then fitted out and flushed with 50×10^{3} cubic metres (1.8×10^{6} cu ft) of pure water to make it ready to receive the new pipeline. On 23 June 2020, the first section was pushed into the tunnel and this continued until 9 July 2020. The pipes were delivered in shorter sections, and then welded out of the tunnel into 600-metre (2,000 ft)+ sections. Two hydraulic thrust machines inserted the pipes at a rate of 1 metre per second (3.3 ft/s) into the tunnel, so that the pipe moved into the tunnel, suspended in the water. Rollers were used to move the pipes into the tunnel, and each section end was welded to the start of the new 620-metre (2,030 ft) pipe section. The pipe has been designed to last 40 years, whilst the tunnel has been lifed at 120 years. All works above ground will be returned to agricultural use, and aside from the Above Ground Installations (AGIs) at Paull and Goxhill, no evidence of the pipeline or tunnel will be visible on the surface.

The pipeline was commissioned and gas started flowing through for the first time in December 2020. It is designed to carry up to 20% of the United Kingdom's gas supply, during peak winter demand. The pipe is the longest pipeline in a tunnel in Europe and is also the longest hydraulically inserted gas pipeline in the world, for which it was awarded a Guinness World Record in November 2020. The project was costed at around the £100 million mark in 2016, but on opening, full works, remediation and the installation of the AGIs (above ground installations), meant the cost was £150 million. Initially, Ofgem refused National Grid the authority to pass the cost of the project onto consumers, with Ofgem citing that there was no need to carry out the work, "despite National Grid’s claim that the 3km-long pipeline was at risk of catastrophic failure." By this point in August 2018, National Grid had already spent £90 million on the then estimated £140 million project. Ofgem responded by saying that "National Grid has not demonstrated that the benefits of replacing the pipe outweigh the costs". However, in September 2018, Ofgem changed their view and allowed the National Grid to charge £111 million of the cost to consumers. Initially, National Grid had asked for £140 million, but Ofgem argued that "...the project could have been delivered more efficiently."

== Details of pipeline and tunnel ==
- Length (of tunnel) – 4,860 metres (15,940 ft)
- Diameter of TBM – 4.38 metres (14.4 ft)
- Diameter of concrete tunnel – 3.65 metres (12 ft)
- Average depth – 30 metres (98 ft)
- Length of pipes (x 8) – 620 metres (2,030 ft)
- Diameter of pipes – 1.05 metres (3 ft 5 in)
- Weight of individual pipe sections – 850 tonnes (940 tons)
- Gas delivery capacity of pipeline – 70×10^{6}–100×10^{6} cubic metres (2.5×10^{9}–3.5×10^{9} cu ft) per day. (Note: This represents 20% of the UK peak winter demand for gas.)

== See also ==
- Easington Gas Terminal
- National Transmission System
