= Mary Fergusson =

British civil engineer (1914–1997)

Molly Fergusson OBE
- Born: Mary Isolen Fergusson; 28 April 1914; Stoke, Plymouth, England
- Died: 30 November 1997 (aged 83); London, England
- Occupation: Civil engineer

Mary "Molly" Isolen Fergusson OBE (28 April 1914 – 30 November 1997) was a British civil engineer who was the first female fellow of the Institution of Civil Engineers, elected in 1957.

== Early life and education ==
Molly Fergusson was born on 28 April 1914, at Stoke, Plymouth, to Mildred Gladys Mercer and John N. Fraser Fergusson and was brought up in York, where her father made radiography equipment. She was head girl at York College, graduated in civil engineering from the University of Edinburgh in 1936, and to complete her training was indentured for two years at Blyth and Blyth of Edinburgh, unpaid for the first year.

== Civil engineering work ==
She remained with the firm and worked on bridges and other infrastructure projects in Scotland, becoming a corporate member of the Institution of Civil Engineers in 1939. She had probably been the first woman to be made a senior partner in a consulting engineering firm in 1948. That this firm was Blyth and Blyth, one of the most prestigious of Scottish firms, says much for her engineering ability and hard work. Encouraged by her medical father and her school, York College, she graduated from Edinburgh in engineering in 1936. She worked unpaid for a year for Blyth and Blyth before being put on the payroll at thirty shillings a week, making her the first female senior partner in a UK civil engineering firm in 1948. She was personally responsible for a number of engineering works. She assisted the senior partner designing a range of civil engineering projects, including bridges, drainage and sewerage schemes (e.g. the River Leven water purification works), and industrial projects (e.g. Markinch paper mills for Tullis Russell). The two-level pre-stressed concrete footbridge over the Gala Water at Galashiels included a spiral staircase and a sewer, and the concrete Devonside Bridge curved across the river to Tillicoultry. From the 1960s, the firm worked on examples of Scottish modernist architecture, working with architects from local authorities, and private practices, including some buildings for the University of Edinburgh. On 15 January 1957, she was the first woman to be elected as full member of Britain's senior engineering society, the Institution of Civil Engineers. In 1967, Fergusson was part of the organisational committee for the Second International Conference of Women Engineers and Scientists. In 1971, she chaired the Verena Holmes Lecture, "Engineering the Environment" at the Napier College of Science and Technology, Edinburgh.

== Later life and legacy ==
She retired from full-time work in 1978.

Fergusson continued her engineering work as a consultant, using her fees to create and support a fund to help engineering students. She was active as a member of the Women's Engineering Society and other community organisations. She died on 30 November 1997, aged 83, in London.

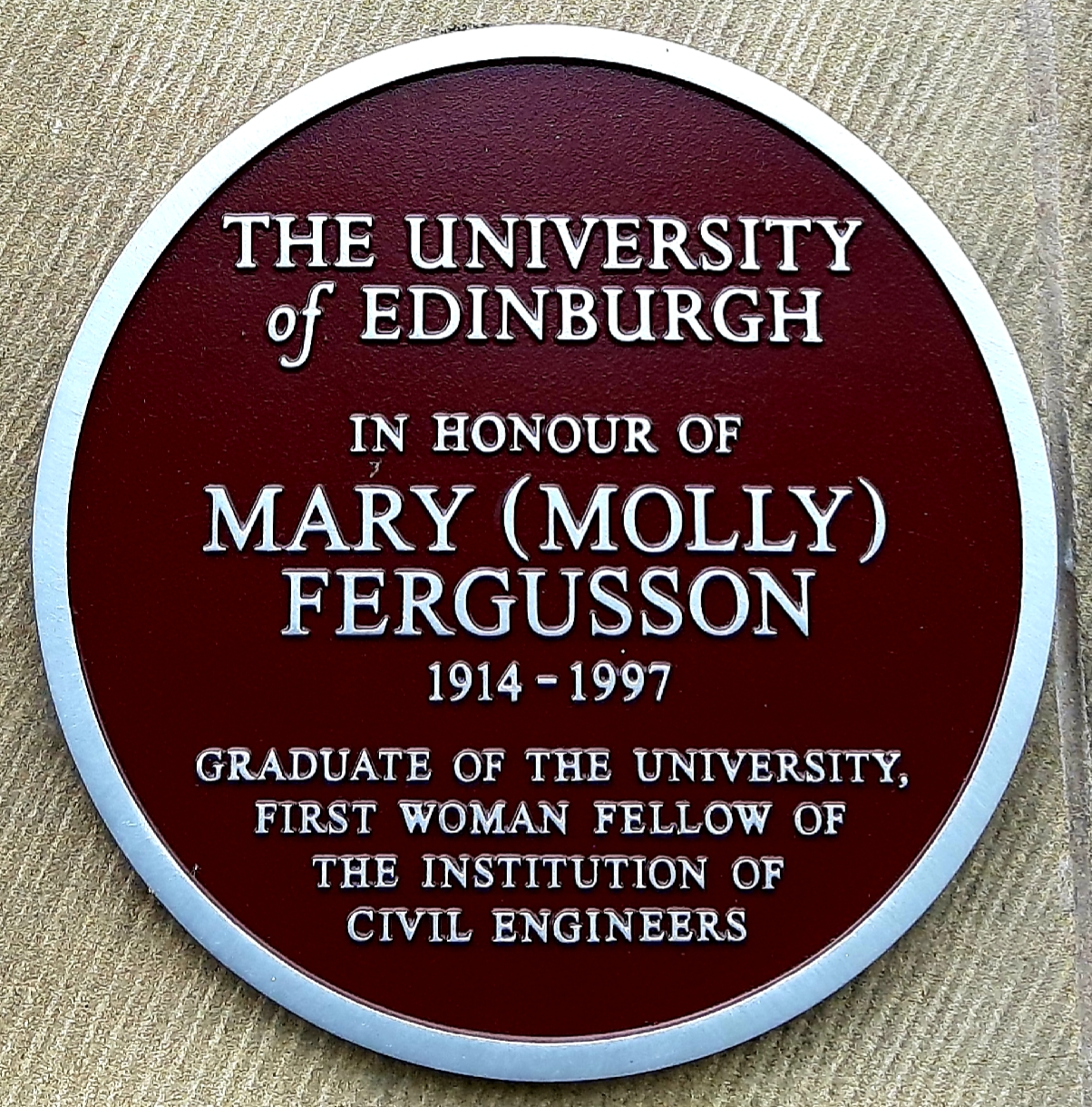
Plaque to Fergusson at the University of Edinburgh's School of Engineering

She was appointed OBE in the 1979 Birthday Honours.

She was awarded an honorary Doctor of Science degree at Heriot-Watt University in 1985, for her work in encouraging women to take up engineering careers. At a celebration of Fergusson's life, the Dean of the Faculty of Engineering at Heriot-Watt University, Clephane Hume remarked she was "A memorable lady, with a terrific sense of humour".

A portrait of Fergusson was unveiled in June 2015 in the William Arrol building at Heriot-Watt University, where a hall of residence is named after her.

National Grid named a 510 tonne, 160-metre-long tunnel boring machine "Mary" after Fergusson, in honour of her status as the first female fellow of the Institution of Civil Engineers. It was used between 2018 and 2019 to bore a tunnel under the River Humber as part of a project to secure 20% of Britain's gas supplies.

The University of Edinburgh erected a plaque to Ferguson at the main entrance to the Sanderson Building at King's Buildings as part of its 2018 150th anniversary of the School of Engineering. It also created the Molly Ferguson Initiative to promote the visibility and community of women in the School of Engineering.

In 2019, she was inducted into the Scottish Engineering Hall of Fame.

In March 2026, the Molly Fergusson Room was opened at the University of Edinburgh’s King’s Buildings Campus as part of the International Women’s Day celebration.
