= Aukra Church =

Church in Møre og Romsdal, Norway

- Aukra kyrkje
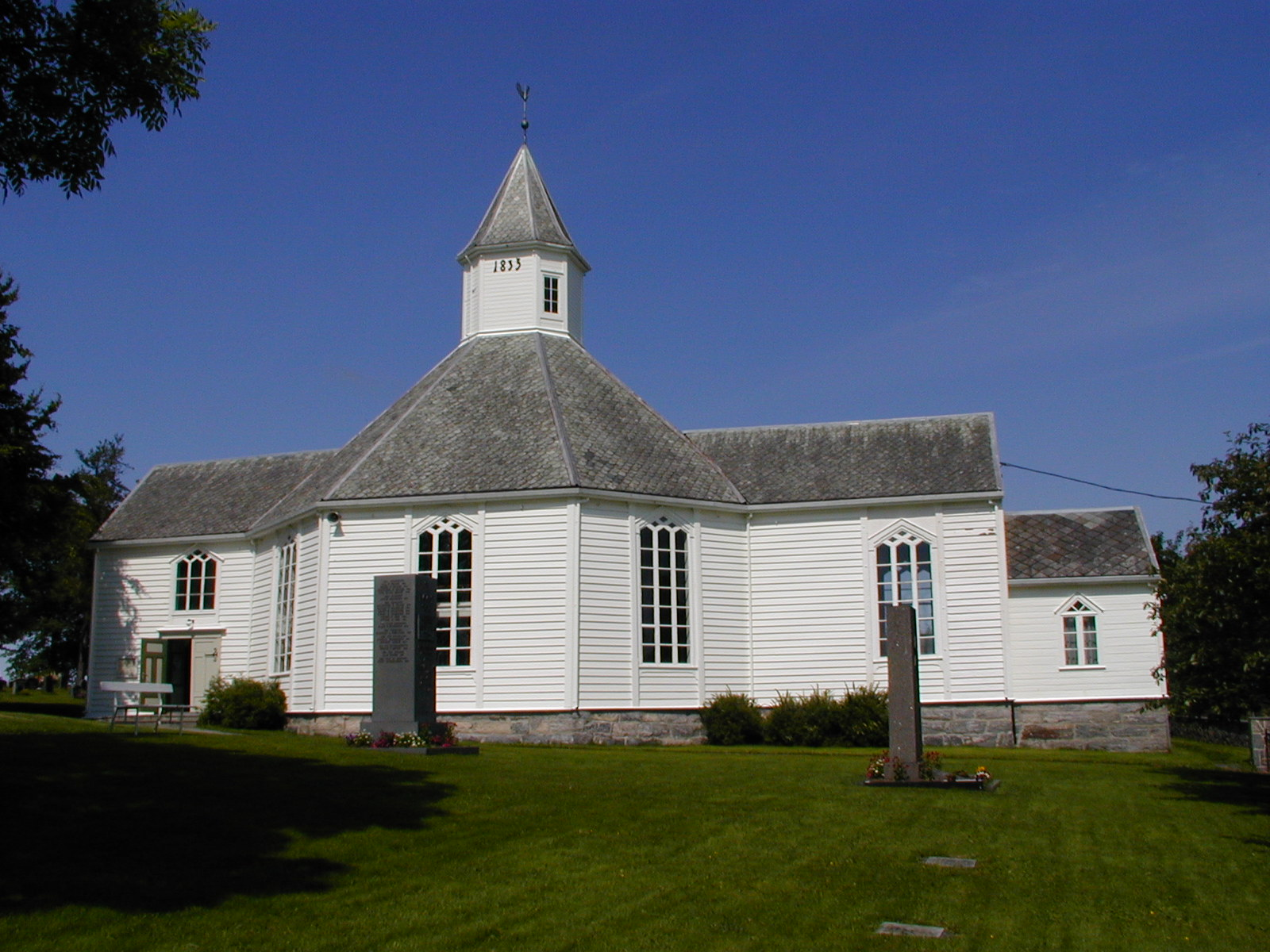
- View of the church
- Aukra Church
- 62°47′26″N 6°55′01″E
- Location: Aukra Municipality, Møre og Romsdal
- Country: Norway
- Denomination: Church of Norway
- Churchmanship: Evangelical Lutheran

History
- Status: Parish church
- Founded: 14th century
- Consecrated: 1835

Architecture
- Functional status: Active
- Architectural type: Octagonal
- Completed: 1835 (191 years ago)

Specifications
- Capacity: 250
- Materials: Wood

Administration
- Diocese: Møre bispedømme
- Deanery: Molde domprosti
- Parish: Aukra
- Norwegian Cultural Heritage Site
- Type: Church
- Status: Automatically protected
- ID: 85143

Aukra Church (Norwegian: Aukra kyrkje) is a parish church of the Church of Norway in Aukra Municipality in Møre og Romsdal county, Norway. It is located in the village of Aukrasanden on the southeast coast of the island of Gossa. It is the church for the Aukra parish which is part of the Molde domprosti (arch-deanery) in the Diocese of Møre. The white, wooden church was built in an octagonal design in 1835 by an unknown architect. The church seats about 250 people.

== History ==
There has been a church here on Gossa island for centuries. The earliest existing historical records of the church date back to 1495, but the church already existed at that time. The first church on the island was probably a stave church that was constructed in the 14th century. The church was located about 60 metres (200 ft) west of the site of the present church. In 1648, the old church was rebuilt, saving only the old choir of the stave church. Upon completion, the church was a timber-framed cruciform building. In 1663, the old choir portion of the church was torn down and replaced with new timber-framed construction. In 1709, the church was destroyed by fire after a lightning strike.

In 1712, a new cruciform church was completed on the same site as the old medieval building. On 19 December 1772, the new building was also struck by lightning and burned to the ground. A new cruciform building was constructed on the same site to replace the old building. This time, there was no tower on the church, but rather a free-standing bell tower was constructed to lessen the likelihood of another lightning strike.

In 1814, this church served as an election church (Norwegian: valgkirke). Together with more than 300 other parish churches across Norway, it was a polling station for elections to the 1814 Norwegian Constituent Assembly which wrote the Constitution of Norway. This was Norway's first national elections. Each church parish was a constituency that elected people called "electors" who later met together in each county to elect the representatives for the assembly that was to meet at Eidsvoll Manor later that year.

In 1834, the church was again struck by lightning and it burned to the ground. In 1835, a new church was constructed about 60 metres (200 ft) east of the old church. The new church was built with an octagonal design. It was consecrated in 1835.

== See also ==
- List of churches in Møre
