= Aukrasanden =

Village in Aukra Municipality, Norway

Aukrasanden Aukra
- Village
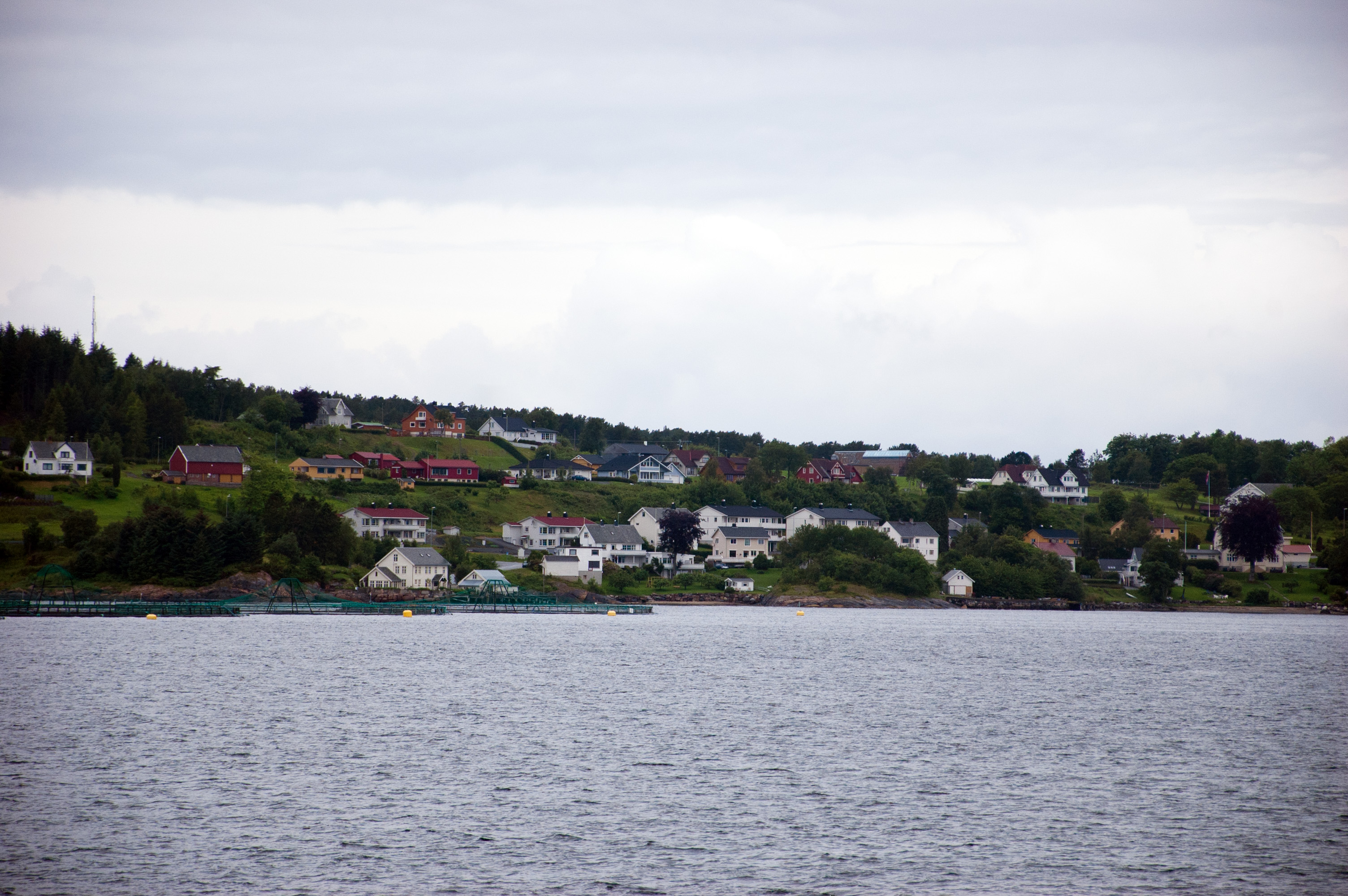
- Interactive map of Aukrasanden
- Location within Møre og Romsdal Location within Norway
- Coordinates: 62.7910°N 6.9180°E
- Country: Norway
- Region: Western Norway
- County: Møre og Romsdal
- District: Romsdal
- Municipality: Aukra Municipality

Area
  - Total: 1.18 km^{2} (0.46 sq mi)
- Elevation: 30 m (98 ft)

Population (2024)
  - Total: 978
  - Density: 829/km^{2} (2,150/sq mi)
- Time zone: UTC+01:00 (CET)
  - Summer (DST): UTC+02:00 (CEST)
- Post Code: 6480 Aukra

Aukrasanden is a village in Aukra Municipality in Møre og Romsdal county, Norway. The village is located on the southeast side of the island of Gossa. Just south of Aukrasanden is a ferry connection, across the Julsundet strait, to the village of Hollingen on the mainland.

Aukrasanden is the only urban area on the island of Gossa. The northern part of the village is known as Varhaugvika and just south of Varhaugvika is Falkhytta, where the municipal administration is located. The southern part of the village is known as Aukrasanden, which is where Aukra Church is located.

The 1.18-square-kilometre (290-acre) village has a population (2024) of 978 and a population density of 829 inhabitants per square kilometre (2,150/sq mi).
