= Langeled pipeline =

Gas pipeline from Norway to the UK

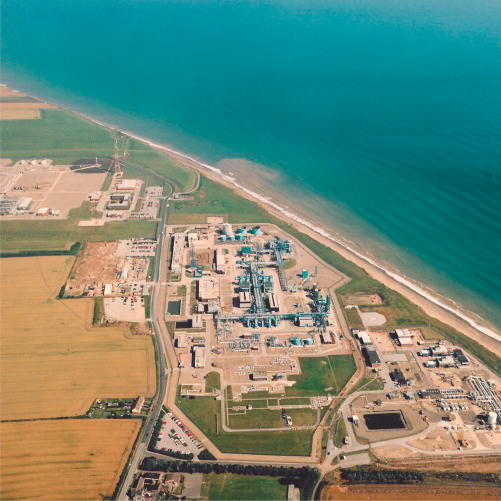
- Easington terminal of the Langeled pipeline

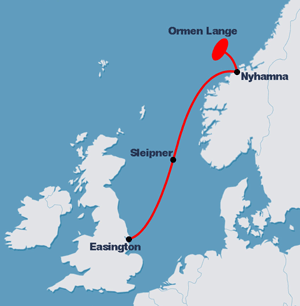
- Location of Langeled pipeline

Location
- Country: Norway, United Kingdom
- Direction: east-south-west
- Start: Nyhamna, Norway
- Passes through: Sleipner Riser platform
- To: Easington, United Kingdom

General information
- Type: natural gas
- Partners: Petoro, Statoil, Norske Shell, DONG Energy, ExxonMobil, ConocoPhillips, Gassco
- Operator: Gassco

Technical information
- Length: 1,166 km (725 mi)
- Maximum discharge: 25.5 billion cubic meters per year
- Diameter: 42 to 44 in (1,067 to 1,118 mm)

The Langeled pipeline (originally known as Britpipe) is an underwater gas pipeline transporting Norwegian natural gas to the United Kingdom. Before the completion of the Nord Stream 1 pipeline, it was the longest subsea pipeline in the world.

== History ==
The project was launched under the original name Britpipe. In October 2003, Royal Dutch Shell, ExxonMobil and Statoil signed agreements to supply natural gas through the Britpipe. The pipeline's construction began in 2004. The largest part of the pipeline was installed by Acergy Piper, a pipe-laying ship of Acergy. Other pipe-laying ships used were Solitaire of Allseas, and Saipem 7000 of Saipem.

The pipeline was opened in two stages. The southern section (Sleipner Riser platform to Easington) began piping gas on 1 October 2006, the northern section (Nyhamna to Sleipner Riser) opened in October 2007. The official opening of the project was held in London on 16 October 2006 by then-Prime Minister Tony Blair and his Norwegian counterpart, Jens Stoltenberg.

== Route ==
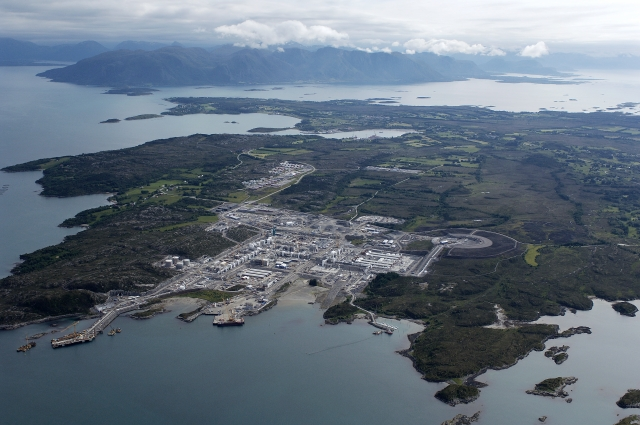
Ormen Lange Nyhamna

The pipeline runs 1,166 kilometres (725 mi) through the North Sea from the Nyhamna terminal in Norway via the Sleipner Riser platform in the North Sea to Easington Gas Terminal in England. The pipeline is designated to bring natural gas from the Ormen Lange gas process terminal to the UK, but through the connector at Sleipner Riser it provides also an opportunity to send gas through Gassco's existing network to continental Europe.

== Technical description ==
The annual capacity of the Langeled pipeline is 25.5 billion cubic metres (900 billion cubic feet). That equates to some 20% of Britain's peak gas demand. With the energy content of natural gas at 39 MJ (megajoules) per normal cubic meter, the capacity energy flux is 31.5 GW (gigawatts).

The Langeled pipeline supplements the Vesterled system with annual capacity about 12 bcm, which runs from the Heimdal gas field platform in the North Sea to St. Fergus in Scotland.

The project cost £1.7 billion.

=== Nyhamna-Sleipner Riser section ===
The Nyhamna-Sleipner Riser leg has a diameter of 1,067 millimetres (42.0 in) and can operate with a pressure of 250 bar.

=== Hub at Sleipner Riser ===
At Sleipner Riser the Langeled has a connection to the existing Gassled transport system.

=== Sleipner Riser-Easington section ===
The Sleipner Riser-Easington leg has a diameter of 1,118 millimetres (44.0 in), which makes it the largest submarine pipeline in the North Sea. Its pressure is 155 bar.

== Ownership and operation ==
The owner of the Langeled pipeline is Gassled. The operator for Langeled is Gassco and technical service provider is Equinor. Equinor also runs the gas export project. The principal funding for the project was provided by the syndicated loan structured by ABN AMRO and mainly subscribed by several banks, among them Barclays Bank, Royal Bank of Scotland, and Defoe Fournier & Cie.

== See also ==
- Interconnector
- BBL Pipeline
- Frigg UK System
- Snøhvit
