= Julsundet =

Strait in Møre og Romsdal, Norway

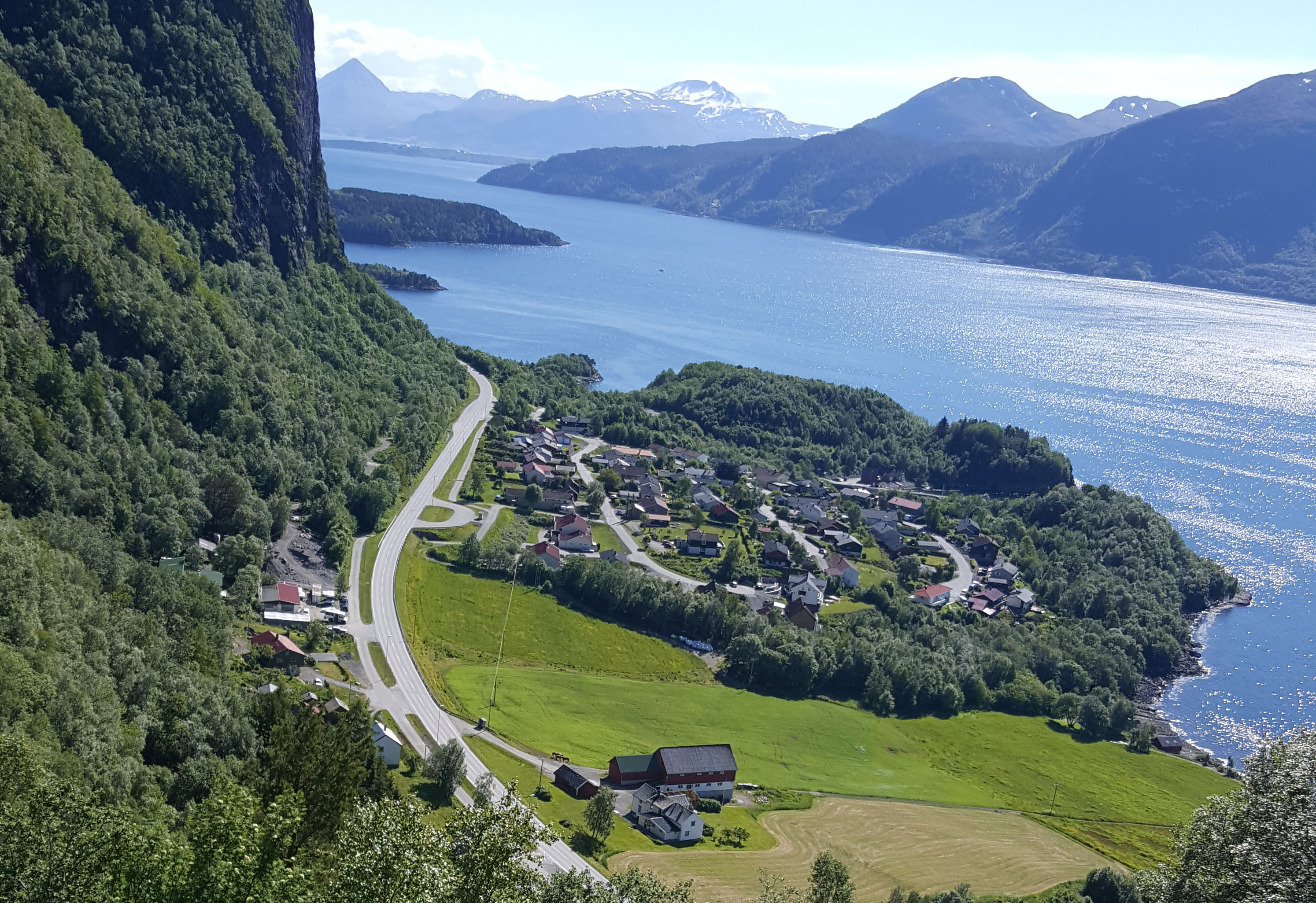
- View of the strait
- Interactive map of the fjord
- Location: Møre og Romsdal county, Norway
- Coordinates: 62.7417°N 06.9476°E
- Type: Strait
- Basin countries: Norway
- Max. length: 15 kilometres (9.3 mi)
- Max. width: 2 to 3 km (1.2 to 1.9 mi)
- Max. depth: 500 metres (1,600 ft)

Julsundet is a 15-kilometre (9.3 mi) long strait connecting the Norwegian Sea to the Romsdalsfjorden. The strait is located about 10 kilometres (6.2 mi) west of the town of Molde in Møre og Romsdal county, Norway. The strait runs through Aukra Municipality, Hustadvika Municipality, and Molde Municipality. The strait flows north–south from the village of Bud (in Hustadvika Municipality) to Julneset (in Molde Municipality). It flows between the Romsdal Peninsula (on the east side) and the islands of Otrøya and Gossa (on the west side). The Frænfjorden empties into the Julsundet strait at the small island of Vågøya.

The strait is up to 500 metres (1,600 ft) deep and it is 2 to 3 kilometres (1.2 to 1.9 mi) wide. It has a significant tidal current and is exposed to strong northerly winds. Julsundet was heavily fortified by the Germans during World War II.

The mainland part of Aukra Municipality is also often referred to as Julsundet.
