= Ormen Lange (gas field) =

Large fossil fuel deposit off the coast of Norway

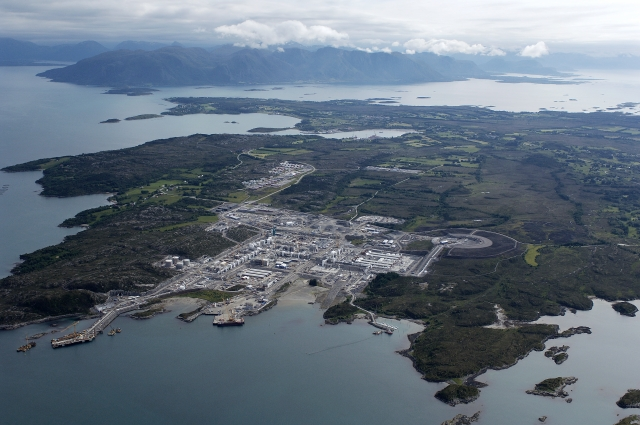
- Ormen Lange facilities at Nyhamna

- Location within Norway
- Country: Norway
- Location: Southern part of the Norwegian Sea
- Block: 6305/5
- Offshore/onshore: offshore
- Coordinates: 63°29′48.33″N 5°23′11.47″E
- Operator: Norske Shell
- Partners: Petoro; Statoil; Norske Shell; DONG Energy; ExxonMobil

Field history
- Discovery: 1997
- Start of production: 2007

Production
- Current production of gas: 70×10^{6} m^{3}/d (2.5×10^{9} cu ft/d)
- Recoverable gas: 300×10^{9} m^{3} (11×10^{12} cu ft)

Ormen Lange is a natural gas field on the Norwegian continental shelf. It is situated 120 kilometres (75 mi) northwest of Kristiansund, where seabed depths vary between 800 and 1,100 metres (2,600 and 3,600 ft). The field is named after the famous longship Ormen Lange of Olaf Tryggvason, a 10th-century Viking king of Norway.

== History ==
Production of gas began with three wells in September 2007. The King and Queen of Norway attended the official opening of this project, delivered on time and within budget, on 6 October 2007, at the football stadium in Molde. During the opening, King Harald officially opened the terminal which would supply Great Britain with enough natural gas to cover 20% of its total annual needs.

The proposal to build the Langeled subsea pipeline, the world’s second longest subsea export pipeline after Nord Stream 1, was approved in February 2003. The 1,166 km (725 mi) pipeline runs across the North Sea from Nyhamna to the Easington Gas Terminal near the mouth of the Humber estuary on the UK’s east coast.

== Reserves ==
The reservoir is approximately 40 kilometres (25 mi) long and 8 kilometres (5 mi) wide, and lies about 3,000 metres (9,800 ft) below sea level. Recoverable gas reserves are estimated to be ~300 billion cubic meters.

== Technical description ==
The Ormen Lange field has been developed without using conventional offshore platforms. Instead, 24 subsea wellheads in four seabed templates on the ocean floor are connected directly by two 30 inches (762 mm) pipelines to an onshore process terminal at Nyhamna. After processing, the gas is exported by the world's second longest subsea gas pipeline - Langeled pipeline - approximately 1,200 kilometres (750 mi) from Nyhamna to Easington in England. The northern section of the export pipeline has a diameter of 42 inches (1,067 mm), and the section from Sleipner to Easington has a diameter of 44 inches (1,118 mm). The field produces 70 million cubic meters of natural gas per day.

Total cost is estimated to reach 66 billion Norwegian kroner (around US$12 billion) by the time of completion.

The onshore facility at Nyhamna was designed by Aker Solutions Engineering in 2003-2007.

== Natural conditions ==
Extreme natural conditions at the site (subzero temperatures part of the year, stormy seas, strong underwater currents, uneven seabed) put great demands on the technology used in the project. The Storegga Slides that occurred in the area about 8,000 years ago have been investigated, with the conclusion that the risk of recurrence is negligible.

== Ownership and operators ==
Several companies share ownership of Ormen Lange.

- Petoro AS: 36.4850%
- Statoil: 25.3452%
- Norske Shell: 17.8134%
- DONG Energy: 14.0208%
- ExxonMobil: 6.3356%

Ormen Lange was operated by Statoil during the development stage. On 30 November 2007, Norske Shell took over as the operator.

== See also ==
- Langeled pipeline
- Noweco
- Snøhvit
