= Hustad (disambiguation) =

Hustad is a village in Hustadvika Municipality in Møre og Romsdal county, Norway.

Hustad may also refer to:

== People ==
- Hustad (surname), including a list of people with the name

== Places ==
- Hustad Church, a church in Inderøy Municipality in Trøndelag county, Norway
- Hustad Church (Møre og Romsdal), a church in Hustadvika Municipality in Møre og Romsdal county, Norway
- Hustad Municipality, a former municipality in Møre og Romsdal county, Norway
- Hustad Municipality, later known as Sandvollan Municipality, a former municipality in the old Nord-Trøndelag county, Norway

== See also ==
- Hustadvika, a coastal area in Møre og Romsdal county, Norway
- Hustadvika Municipality (established: 2020), a municipality in Møre og Romsdal county, Norway
- Husted, a similarly spelled surname
