= Bud Municipality =

Former municipality in Møre og Romsdal, Norway

Bud Municipality Bud herad
- Former municipality
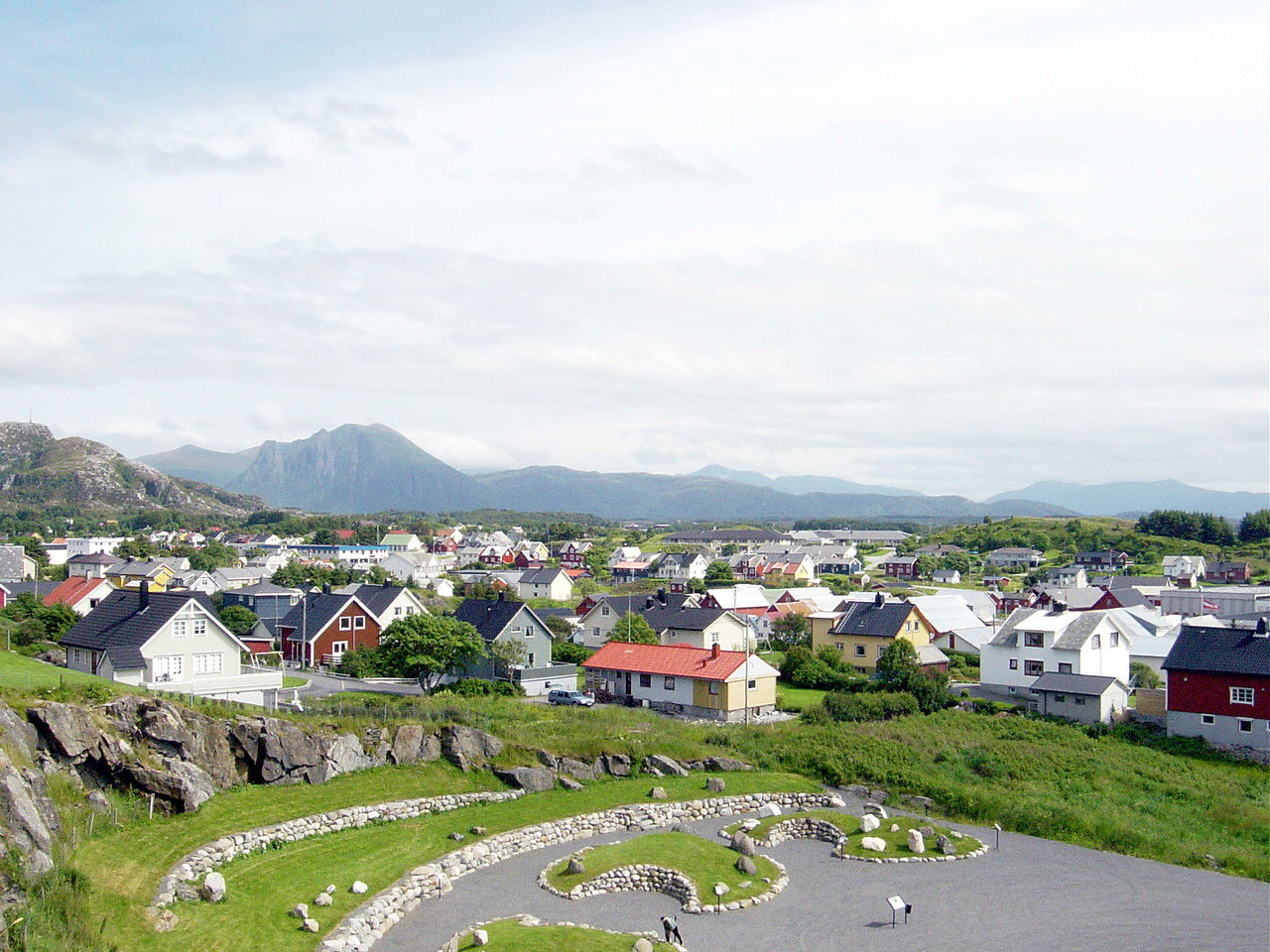
- View of the village of Bud

- Møre og Romsdal within Norway

- Bud within Møre og Romsdal
- Coordinates: 62.9072°N 6.9140°E
- Country: Norway
- County: Møre og Romsdal
- District: Romsdal
- Established: 1 Jan 1838
  - Created as: Formannskapsdistrikt
- Disestablished: 1 Jan 1964
  - Succeeded by: Fræna Municipality
- Administrative centre: Bud

Government
  - Mayor (1959–1963): Andreas Vestad (LL)

Area (upon dissolution)
  - Total: 32.8 km^{2} (12.7 sq mi)
  - Rank: #610 in Norway
- Highest elevation: 160 m (520 ft)

Population (1963)
  - Total: 1,616
  - Rank: #515 in Norway
  - Density: 49.3/km^{2} (128/sq mi)
  - Change (10 years): ▲ +3.3%
- Demonym: Buaværing

Official language
  - Norwegian form: Nynorsk
- Time zone: UTC+01:00 (CET)
  - Summer (DST): UTC+02:00 (CEST)
- ISO 3166 code: NO-1549

Bud is a former municipality in Møre og Romsdal county, Norway. The 33-square-kilometre (13 sq mi) municipality existed from 1838 until its dissolution in 1964. The area is now part of Hustadvika Municipality in the traditional district of Romsdal. The administrative centre was the village of Bud. Bud Church was the main church for the municipality.

Prior to its dissolution in 1964, the 32.8-square-kilometre (12.7 sq mi) municipality was the 610th largest by area out of the 689 municipalities in Norway. Bud Municipality was the 515th most populous municipality in Norway with a population of about 1,616. The municipality's population density was 49.3 inhabitants per square kilometre (128/sq mi) and its population had increased by 3.3% over the previous 10-year period.

== General information ==
On 1 January 1838, the prestegjeld (parish) of Bud was established as a municipality (see formannskapsdistrikt law). On 1 January 1878, one area of Bud Municipality (population: 15) was transferred to the neighboring Kvernes Municipality. Then on 1 January 1891, the Bollien farm area (population: 15) was also transferred to Kvernes Municipality. On 1 July 1918, Bud Municipality was divided in two: the eastern part remained as Bud Municipality (population: 1,397) and the western part became the new Hustad Municipality (population: 2,062).

During the 1960s, there were many municipal mergers across Norway due to the work of the Schei Committee. On 1 January 1964, there was a merger involving Bud Municipality (population: 1,610) in the west, Hustad Municipality (population: 2,196) in the north, and Fræna Municipality (population: 3,430) in the south, forming a new, larger Fræna Municipality.

=== Name ===
The municipality (originally the parish) is named after the old village of Bud (Old Norse: Búðaver) since the first Bud Church was built there. The name comes from the word búð which is an old word for the modern Norwegian word rorbu which means "fishing hut", such as is commonly seen on the shores of fishing villages.

=== Churches ===
The Church of Norway had one parish (sokn) within Bud Municipality. At the time of the municipal dissolution, it was part of the Bud prestegjeld and the Ytre Romsdal prosti (deanery) in the Diocese of Nidaros.

Churches in Bud Municipality
Parish (sokn)	Church name	Location of the church	Year built
Bud	Bud Church	Bud	1717

== Geography ==
The municipality was located on the northwestern part of the Romsdal Peninsula, along the Hustadvika coastline. Hustad Municipality was to the east, Fræna Municipality was to the south, and Nord-Aukra Municipality was to the southwest. The highest point in the municipality was the 160-metre (520 ft) tall hill Gulberget.

== Government ==
While it existed, Bud Municipality was responsible for primary education (through 10th grade), outpatient health services, senior citizen services, welfare and other social services, zoning, economic development, and municipal roads and utilities. The municipality was governed by a municipal council of directly elected representatives. The mayor was indirectly elected by a vote of the municipal council. The municipality was under the jurisdiction of the Frostating Court of Appeal.

=== Municipal council ===
The municipal council (Herredsstyre) of Bud Municipality was made up of 17 representatives that were elected to four-year terms. The tables below show the historical composition of the council by political party.

Bud heradsstyre 1959–1963
Party name (in Nynorsk)	Number of representatives
Labour Party (Arbeidarpartiet)	8
Christian Democratic Party (Kristeleg Folkeparti)	3
Joint List(s) of Non-Socialist Parties (Borgarlege Felleslister)	5
Local List(s) (Lokale lister)	1
Total number of members:	17

Bud heradsstyre 1955–1959
Party name (in Nynorsk)	Number of representatives
Labour Party (Arbeidarpartiet)	8
Local List(s) (Lokale lister)	9
Total number of members:	17

Bud heradsstyre 1951–1955
Party name (in Nynorsk)	Number of representatives
Local List(s) (Lokale lister)	16
Total number of members:	16

Bud heradsstyre 1947–1951
Party name (in Nynorsk)	Number of representatives
Local List(s) (Lokale lister)	16
Total number of members:	16

Bud heradsstyre 1945–1947
Party name (in Nynorsk)	Number of representatives
Labour Party (Arbeidarpartiet)	6
Joint List(s) of Non-Socialist Parties (Borgarlege Felleslister)	10
Total number of members:	16

Bud heradsstyre 1937–1941*
Party name (in Nynorsk)	Number of representatives
Labour Party (Arbeidarpartiet)	6
List of workers, fishermen, and small farmholders (Arbeidarar, fiskarar, småbrukarar liste)	10
Total number of members:	16
Note: Due to the German occupation of Norway during World War II, no elections were held for new municipal councils until after the war ended in 1945.

=== Mayors ===
The mayor (Nynorsk: ordførar) of Bud Municipality was the political leader of the municipality and the chairperson of the municipal council. The following people have held this position:

- 1838–1839: Jakob P. Stenen
- 1840–1841: Peder Knutsen Vestad
- 1842–1845: Rasmus S. Rishaug
- 1846–1849: Lars P. Hostad
- 1850–1856: Mr. Jordhøi
- 1857–1859: Peder Nerland
- 1860–1861: Ole Olsen Huustad
- 1862–1863: Peder Larsen Bergset
- 1864–1865: Lars F. Farstad
- 1866–1867: Bendik S. Farstad
- 1868–1869: Lars F. Farstad
- 1870–1873: Ingebrigt O. Fagervik
- 1874–1877: Peder Hagerup
- 1878–1883: Peder P. Hustad
- 1884–1897: Hans Ekren
- 1898–1901: O.N. Skarseth
- 1902–1910: Hans Ekren
- 1911–1913: Peder Bjørn Kristvik (V)
- 1914–1918: Ingebrigt Mahle
- 1918–1931: Andreas Jakobsen Sunde
- 1931–1937: Jon Vågen
- 1938–1941: Marius Robinson
- 1945–1945: Marius Robinson
- 1946–1951: Rev. Lars Høyseth
- 1952–1959: Hans Farstad
- 1959–1963: Andreas Vestad (LL)

== See also ==
- List of former municipalities of Norway
