= Janbu =

Janbu is a Norwegian surname. Notable people with the surname include:

- Nilmar Janbu (1921–2013), Norwegian engineer and geotechnician.
- Torunn Janbu (born 1954), Norwegian physician.
