= Bud, Norway =

Village in Hustadvika Municipality, Norway

Bud
- Village
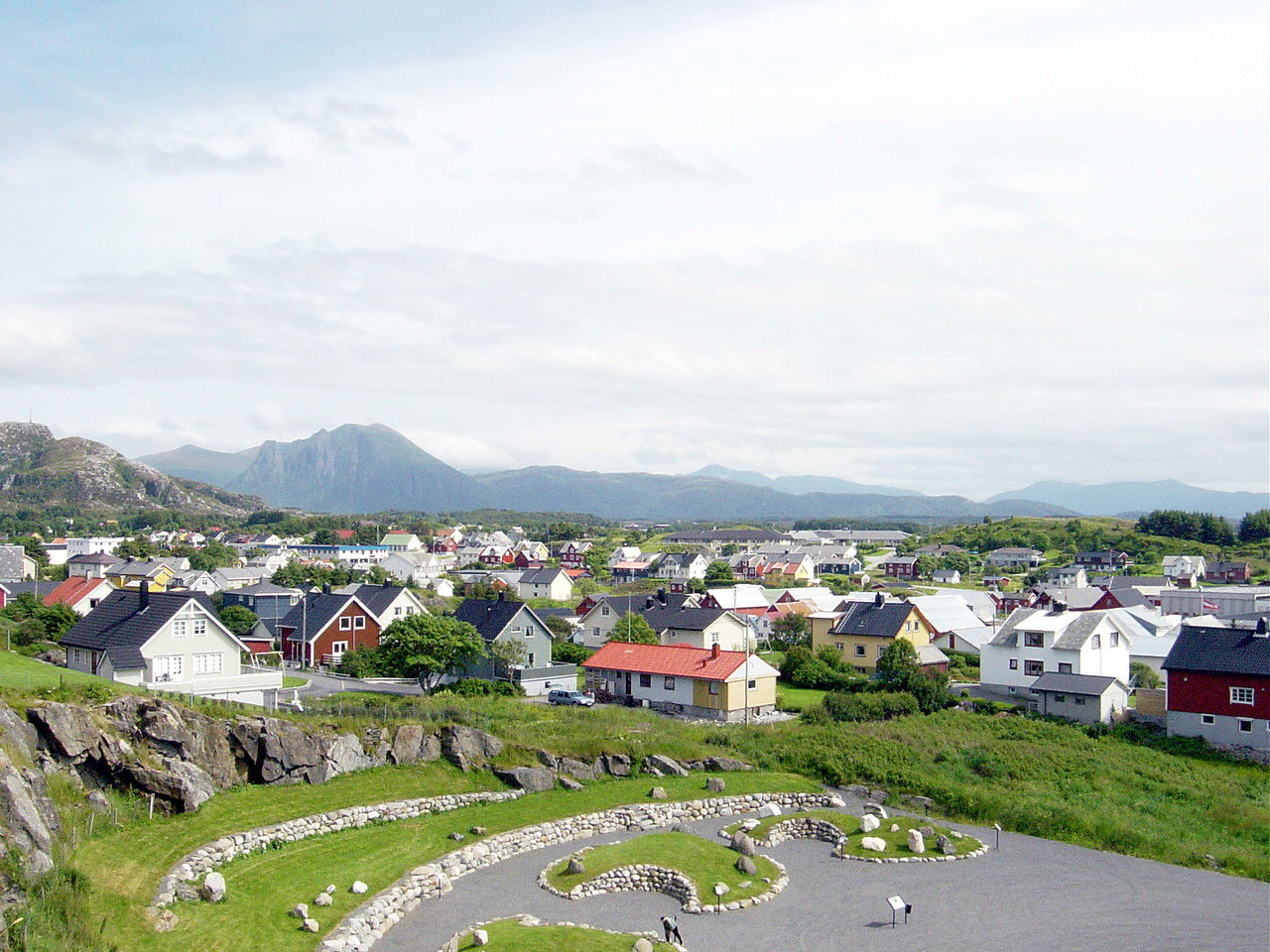
- View of the village
- Interactive map of Bud
- Location within Møre og Romsdal Location within Norway
- Coordinates: 62.9072°N 6.9140°E
- Country: Norway
- Region: Western Norway
- County: Møre og Romsdal
- District: Romsdal
- Municipality: Hustadvika Municipality

Area
  - Total: 0.75 km^{2} (0.29 sq mi)
- Elevation: 7 m (23 ft)

Population (2024)
  - Total: 802
  - Density: 1,069/km^{2} (2,770/sq mi)
- Time zone: UTC+01:00 (CET)
  - Summer (DST): UTC+02:00 (CEST)
- Post Code: 6430 Bud

Bud is a fishing village in Hustadvika Municipality in Møre og Romsdal county in western Norway. The village is located on the Romsdal peninsula along the Atlanterhavsveien road, west of the village of Hustad, north of the village of Tornes, and east of the Bjørnsund islands. Bud Church is located in the village.

The 0.75-square-kilometre (190-acre) village has a population (2024) of 802 and a population density of 1,069 inhabitants per square kilometre (2,770/sq mi).

The village was the administrative centre of the old Bud Municipality, which existed from 1838 until 1964 when it was merged into Fræna Municipality. The old municipality encompassed the northwestern part of the present-day Hustadvika Municipality.

== History ==
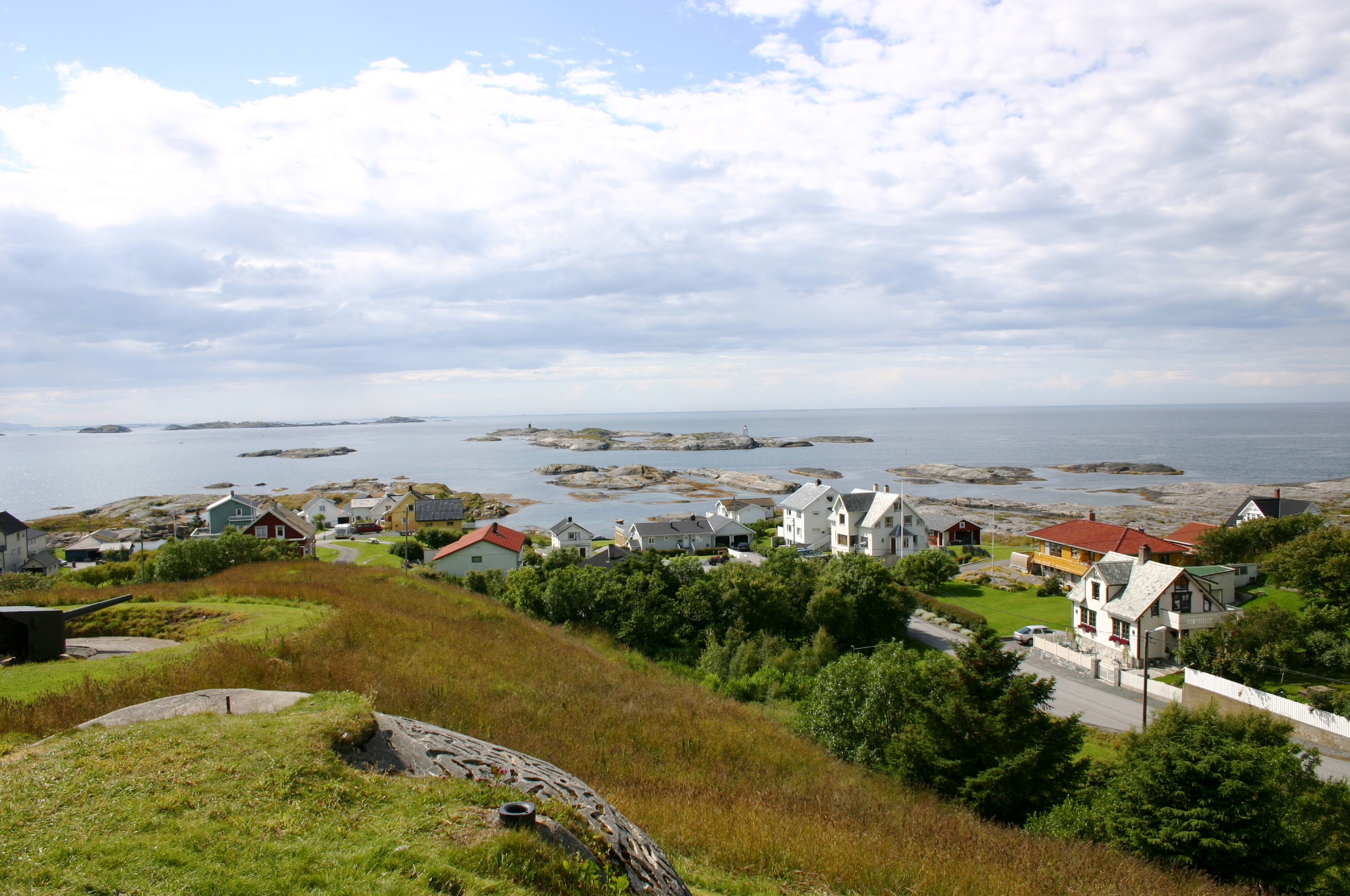
View of the coastline at Bud

Due to a good natural harbor and rich fisheries, Bud grew to become the largest village between the towns of Trondheim and Bergen on the west coast of Norway during the Middle Ages.

At the death of King Frederick I in 1533, it was the site of the last independent Norwegian Privy Council, organized by Olav Engelbrektsson, Archbishop of Nidaros. The meeting led to a failed attempt to break away from the Kalmar Union and King Christian III, and claim Norway's independence by rejecting the Protestant Reformation. The council was the last of its kind in Norway for 270 years.

In 1838, the whole parish of Bud was established as Bud Municipality. The municipality was reduced in size in 1918 when Hustad Municipality was created.

During World War II, the Germans heavily fortified Bud and the nearby Hustadvika coastal area in anticipation of an Allied invasion, as a part of the Atlantic Wall.

In 1964, Bud Municipality was dissolved when it was merged into Fræna Municipality.
