= Bjørnsund Lighthouse =

Coastal lighthouse in Hustadvika, Norway

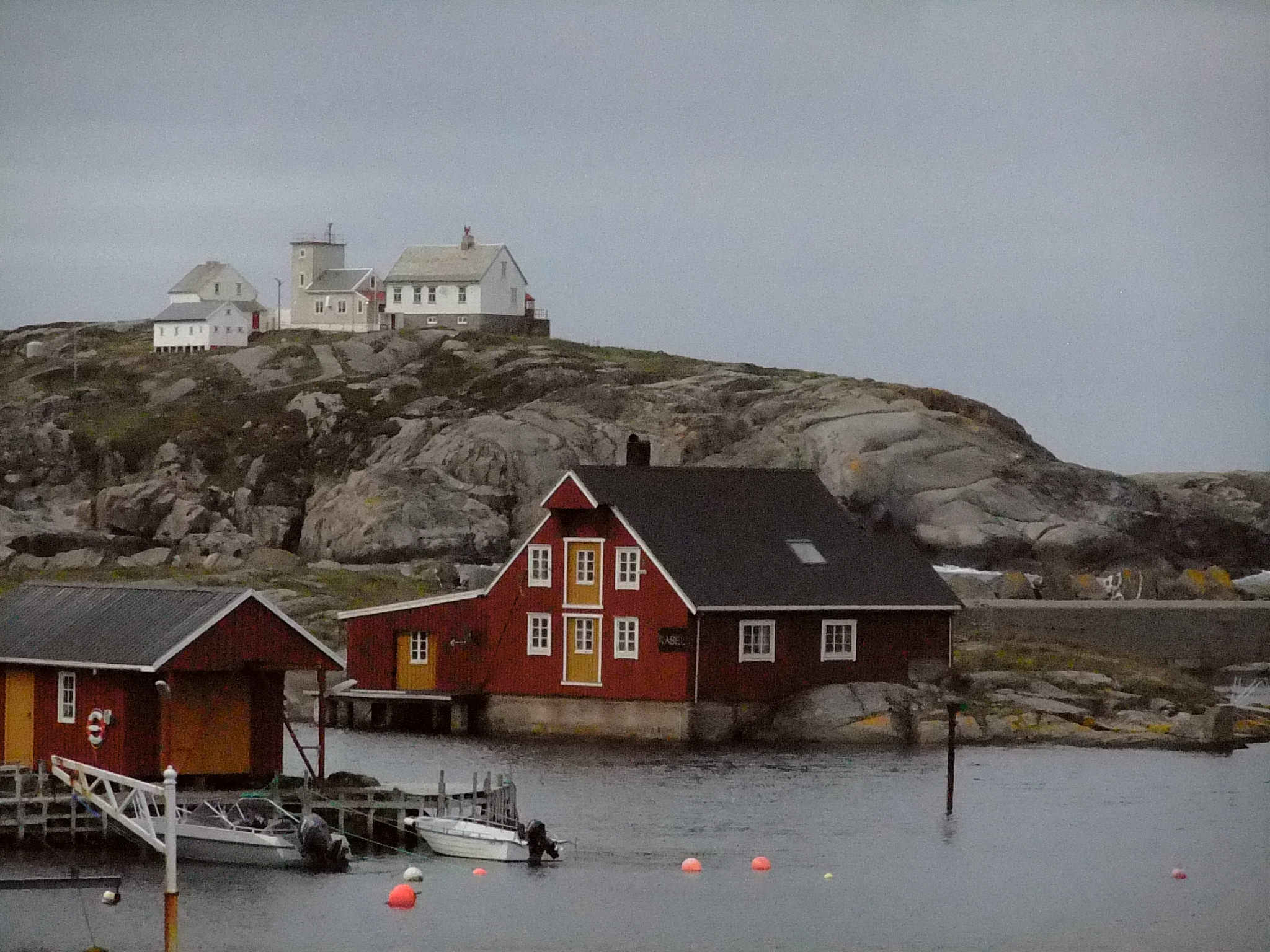
- Location: Moøya, Bjørnsund; Hustadvika Municipality, Møre og Romsdal; Norway
- Coordinates: 62.8956°N 6.8158°E

Tower
- Constructed: 1871
- Construction: Wood
- Automated: 1986
- Height: 9 metres (30 ft)
- Shape: Lantern on the keeper's dwelling
- Heritage: Listed site (2000)
- Racon: B

Light
- First lit: 1871
- Focal height: 26 metres (85 ft)
- Intensity: 16,200 candela
- Range: 15.3 nautical miles (28.3 km; 17.6 mi) (white)
- Characteristic: Oc(2) WRG 8s

Bjørnsund Lighthouse (Norwegian: Bjørnsund fyr) is a coastal lighthouse in Hustadvika Municipality in Møre og Romsdal county, Norway. The lighthouse is located on the small island of Moøya in the Bjørnsund islands, about 5 kilometres (3.1 mi) west of the village of Bud on the mainland.

== History ==
The lighthouse was established in 1871 as a coastal light intended to ease the approach for vessels coming in off the exposed waters of the Hustadvika and making for the sheltered inner shipping lane. It has remained important for shipping around the Hustadvika and on the approach to Molde for over 150 years. The original lighthouse keeper's dwelling was a notched-log timber house built as a family station, with the lantern set in a bay at one corner of the building.

The light was strengthened in 1886 and again in 1902, when a second-order Fresnel lens was installed. A fog horn was added in 1917, when the station also gained a reserve attendant. Early in April 1938, the cargo steamer Rokta ran aground on the Galdeskjæra rocks off the lighthouse during a violent storm; six of the twelve people aboard, along with two of the local rescuers, were killed.

The station was electrified by cable from the mainland in 1948. In 1960 it received a radio beacon, a new supertyphon fog signal and a fog detector. In 1974 it was converted from a family station to a rotation station, with two keepers on duty while two others were ashore, and in 1977 a Racon radar beacon was installed—one of the first two to be set up on the Norwegian coast. The lighthouse was automated in 1986 and de-manned in 1994. It was protected as a listed site in 2000.

Bjørnsund is a former fishing village whose surviving houses have been restored as holiday homes; the lighthouse station is now used partly as a holiday home for employees of the Norwegian Coastal Administration.

== Light ==
The 9-metre (30 ft) tall lighthouse emits a white, red, or green light (depending on direction) occulting twice every 8 seconds. The 16,200 candela light can be seen for up to 15.3 nautical miles (28.3 km; 17.6 mi).

== See also ==
- Lighthouses in Norway
- List of lighthouses in Norway
