= Hustad Municipality =

Former municipality in Møre og Romsdal, Norway

Hustad Municipality Hustad herred
- Former municipality
- Møre og Romsdal within Norway

- Hustad within Møre og Romsdal
- Coordinates: 62°57′20″N 07°05′20″E
- Country: Norway
- County: Møre og Romsdal
- District: Romsdal
- Established: 1 July 1918
  - Preceded by: Bud Municipality
- Disestablished: 1 Jan 1964
  - Succeeded by: Fræna Municipality
- Administrative centre: Hustad

Government
  - Mayor (1960–1963): Arthur Lindseth (Sp)

Area (upon dissolution)
  - Total: 120 km^{2} (46 sq mi)
  - Rank: #478 in Norway
- Highest elevation: 891 m (2,923 ft)

Population (1963)
  - Total: 2,199
  - Rank: #408 in Norway
  - Density: 18.3/km^{2} (47/sq mi)
  - Change (10 years): ▼ −1.7%
- Demonym: Hustad-folk

Official language
  - Norwegian form: Neutral
- Time zone: UTC+01:00 (CET)
  - Summer (DST): UTC+02:00 (CEST)
- ISO 3166 code: NO-1550

Hustad is a former municipality in Møre og Romsdal county, Norway. The 120-square-kilometre (46 sq mi) municipality existed from 1918 until its dissolution in 1964. The area is now part of Hustadvika Municipality in the traditional district of Romsdal. The administrative centre was the village of Hustad where Hustad Church is located.

Prior to its dissolution in 1964, the 120-square-kilometre (46 sq mi) municipality was the 478th largest by area out of the 689 municipalities in Norway. Hustad Municipality was the 408th most populous municipality in Norway with a population of about 2,199. The municipality's population density was 18.3 inhabitants per square kilometre (47/sq mi) and its population had decreased by 1.7% over the previous 10-year period.

== General information ==
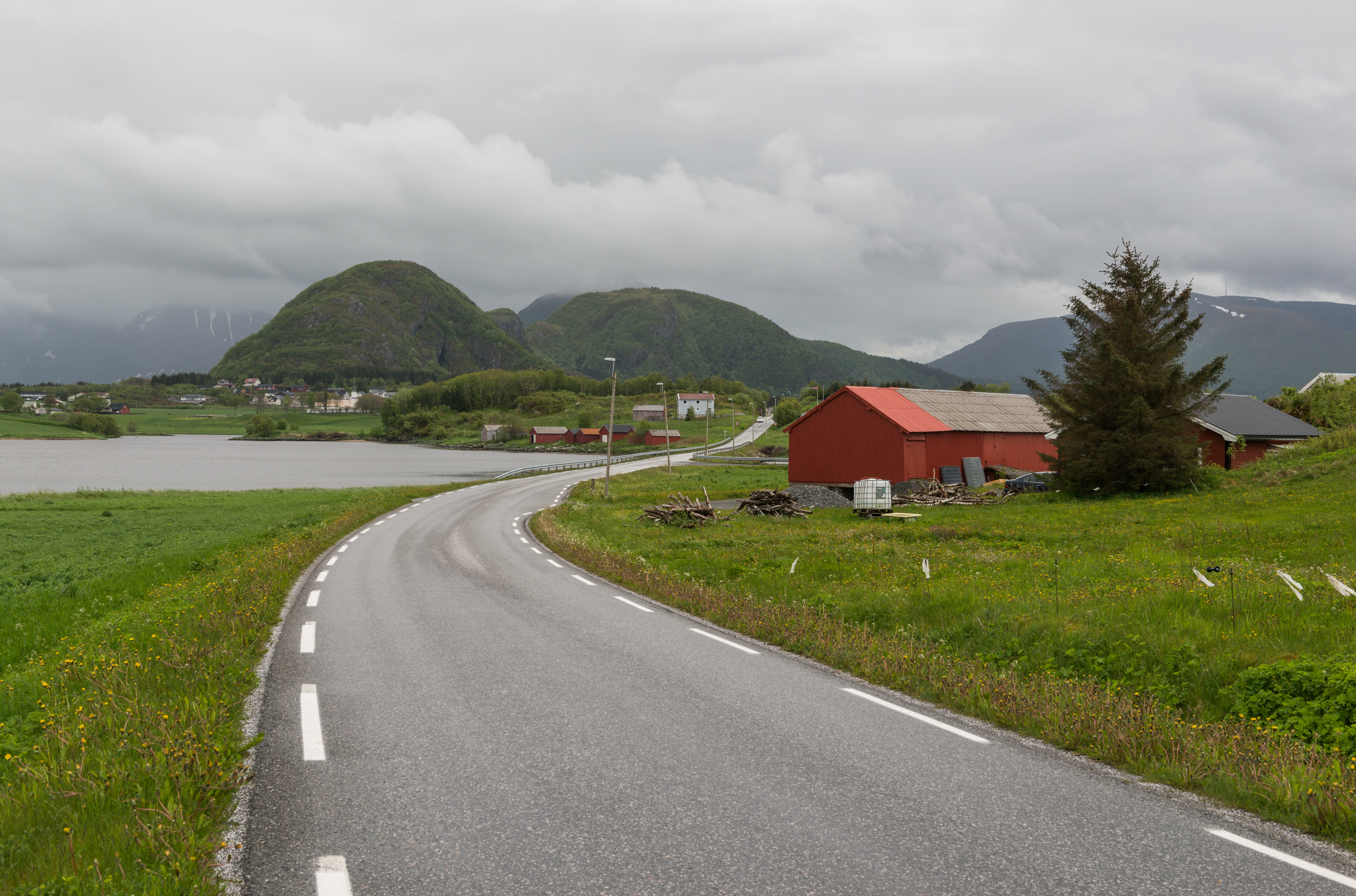
View of the Hustad area

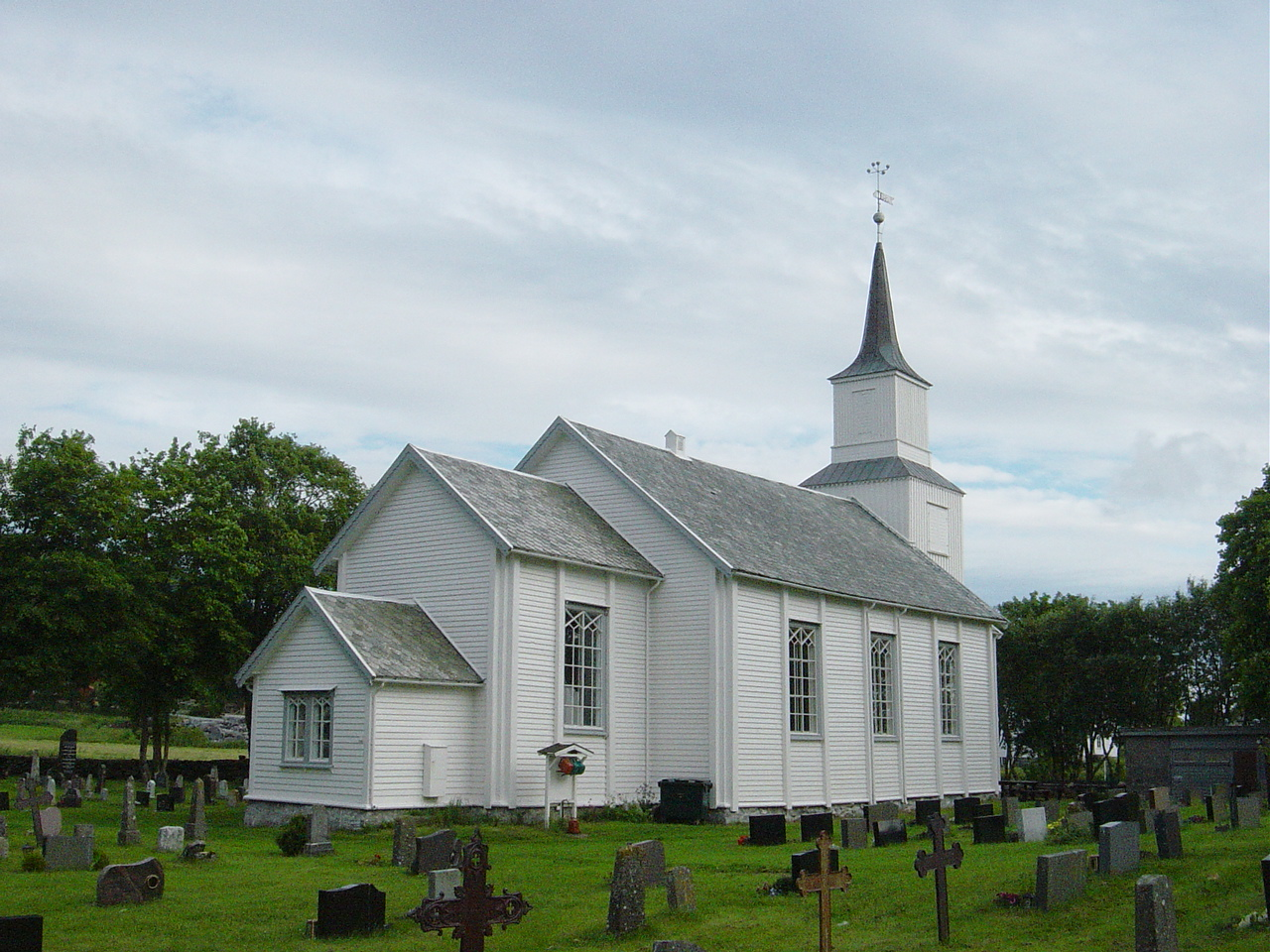
View of Hustad Church, the main church for Hustad Municipality

The municipality of Hustad was established on 1 July 1918 when the larger Bud Municipality was divided into two separate municipalities: Bud Municipality (population: 1,397) in the west and Hustad Municipality (population: 2,062) in the east.

During the 1960s, there were many municipal mergers across Norway due to the work of the Schei Committee. On 1 January 1964, there was a merger involving Hustad Municipality (population: 2,196) in the north, Bud Municipality (population: 1,610) in the west, and Fræna Municipality (population: 3,430) in the south, forming a new, larger Fræna Municipality.

=== Name ===
The municipality (originally the parish) is named after the old Hustad farm (Old Norse: Húsastadðir) since the first Hustad Church was built there. The first element comes from the word hús which means "house". The last element is the plural form of stadðr which means "place" or "village".

=== Churches ===
The Church of Norway had one parish (sokn) within Hustad Municipality. At the time of the municipal dissolution, it was part of the Bud prestegjeld and the Ytre Romsdal prosti (deanery) in the Diocese of Nidaros.

Churches in Hustad Municipality
Parish (sokn)	Church name	Location of the church	Year built
Hustad	Hustad Church	Hustad	1874

== Geography ==
The municipality was located on the northern part of the Romsdal Peninsula, along the Hustadvika coastline. Kornstad Municipality was to the northeast, Eide Municipality was to the east, Fræna Municipality was to the south, and Bud Municipality was to the west. The highest point in the municipality was the 891-metre (2,923 ft) tall mountain Stordalstinden, a tripoint on the border of Hustad Municipality, Eide Municipality, and Fræna Municipality.

== Government ==
While it existed, Hustad Municipality was responsible for primary education (through 10th grade), outpatient health services, senior citizen services, welfare and other social services, zoning, economic development, and municipal roads and utilities. The municipality was governed by a municipal council of directly elected representatives. The mayor was indirectly elected by a vote of the municipal council. The municipality was under the jurisdiction of the Frostating Court of Appeal.

=== Municipal council ===
The municipal council (Herredsstyre) of Hustad Municipality was made up of 17 representatives that were elected to four-year terms. The tables below show the historical composition of the council by political party.

Hustad herredsstyre 1959–1963
Party name (in Norwegian)	Number of representatives
Christian Democratic Party (Kristelig Folkeparti)	4
Centre Party (Senterpartiet)	5
Local List(s) (Lokale lister)	8
Total number of members:	17

Hustad herredsstyre 1955–1959
Party name (in Norwegian)	Number of representatives
Christian Democratic Party (Kristelig Folkeparti)	5
Local List(s) (Lokale lister)	12
Total number of members:	17

Hustad herredsstyre 1951–1955
Party name (in Norwegian)	Number of representatives
Christian Democratic Party (Kristelig Folkeparti)	3
Local List(s) (Lokale lister)	13
Total number of members:	16

Hustad herredsstyre 1947–1951
Party name (in Norwegian)	Number of representatives
Christian Democratic Party (Kristelig Folkeparti)	3
Joint List(s) of Non-Socialist Parties (Borgerlige Felleslister)	1
Local List(s) (Lokale lister)	12
Total number of members:	16

Hustad herredsstyre 1945–1947
Party name (in Norwegian)	Number of representatives
Labour Party (Arbeiderpartiet)	1
Christian Democratic Party (Kristelig Folkeparti)	2
Local List(s) (Lokale lister)	13
Total number of members:	16

Hustad herredsstyre 1937–1941*
Party name (in Norwegian)	Number of representatives
Labour Party (Arbeiderpartiet)	2
List of workers, fishermen, and small farmholders (Arbeidere, fiskere, småbrukere liste)	2
Local List(s) (Lokale lister)	12
Total number of members:	16
Note: Due to the German occupation of Norway during World War II, no elections were held for new municipal councils until after the war ended in 1945.

=== Mayors ===
The mayor (Norwegian: ordfører) of Hustad Municipality was the political leader of the municipality and the chairperson of the municipal council. The following people have held this position:

- 1918–1922: Ingebrigt Mahle
- 1922–1930: Hans F. Farstad
- 1931–1934: Sivert Sandblåst
- 1934–1937: Hans F. Farstad
- 1937–1941: Sivert Sandblåst
- 1945–1947: Hans F. Farstad
- 1948–1957: Harald Haaland
- 1957–1960: Otto Sørgaard
- 1960–1963: Arthur Lindseth (Sp)

== See also ==
- List of former municipalities of Norway
