= Gaustad Chapel =

Church in Møre og Romsdal, Norway

- Gaustad kapell
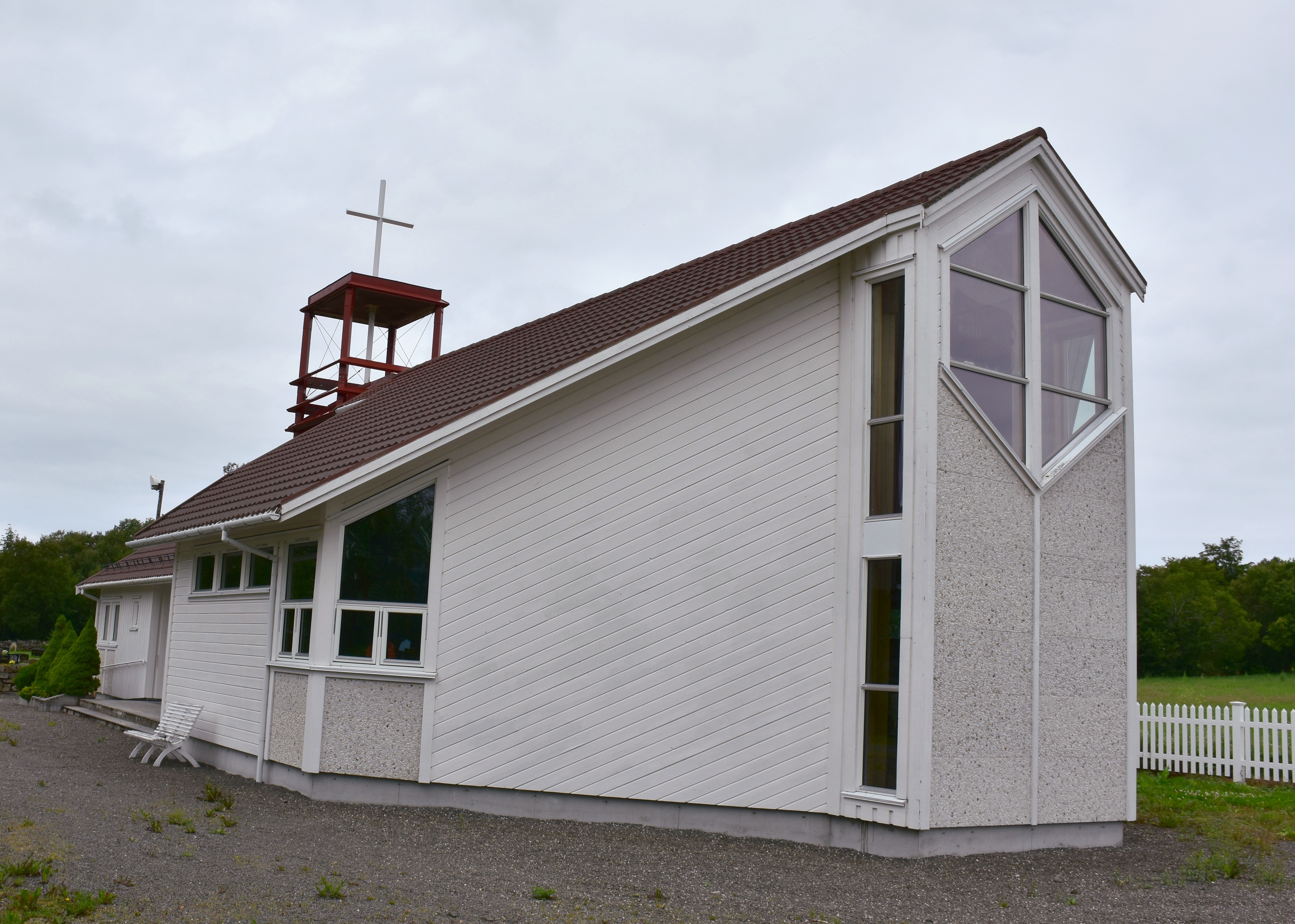
- View of the chapel
- Gaustad Chapel
- 62°59′02″N 7°18′23″E
- Location: Hustadvika Municipality, Møre og Romsdal
- Country: Norway
- Denomination: Church of Norway
- Churchmanship: Evangelical Lutheran

History
- Status: Chapel
- Founded: 2001
- Consecrated: 17 June 2001

Architecture
- Functional status: Active
- Architectural type: Octagonal
- Completed: 2001 (25 years ago)

Specifications
- Capacity: 150
- Materials: Wood

Administration
- Diocese: Møre bispedømme
- Deanery: Molde domprosti
- Parish: Eide
- Norwegian Cultural Heritage Site
- Type: Church site
- Status: Not protected
- ID: 226791

Gaustad Chapel (Norwegian: Gaustad kapell) is a chapel of the Church of Norway in Hustadvika Municipality in Møre og Romsdal county, Norway. It is located in the village of Gaustad, just south of Vevang. It is an annex chapel for the Eide parish which is part of the Molde domprosti (deanery) in the Diocese of Møre. The white, wooden church was built in a octagonal design in 2001. The church seats about 150 people.

== History ==
The chapel was consecrated by Bishop Odd Bondevik on 17 June 2001. The chapel is decorated with glass art made by Anne Brit Krag and stone art with stone from the Nås quarry. The altarpiece, pulpit, and baptismal font are made of stone.

== See also ==
- List of churches in Møre
