= Vevang =

Village in Hustadvika Municipality, Norway

- Village
- Interactive map of Vevang
- Location within Møre og Romsdal Location within Norway
- Coordinates: 63.0048°N 7.2966°E
- Country: Norway
- Region: Western Norway
- County: Møre og Romsdal
- District: Nordmøre
- Municipality: Hustadvika Municipality
- Elevation: 6 m (20 ft)
- Time zone: UTC+01:00 (CET)
  - Summer (DST): UTC+02:00 (CEST)
- Post Code: 6494 Vevang

Vevang is a village in Hustadvika Municipality in Møre og Romsdal county, Norway. The village lies on the northern part of the Romsdal Peninsula, along the Lauvøyfjorden. The village is most-notable because it sits at the western end of the famous Atlantic Ocean Road. The historic Kvitholmen Lighthouse lies about 3.5 kilometres (2.2 mi) northwest of Vevang.
