= Arve Hans Otterlei =

Norwegian politician (born 1932)

Arve Hans Otterlei (born 6 September 1932) is a Norwegian politician for the Progress Party.

He was born in Ålesund as the third of four siblings. The family moved to Brattvåg, and Otterlei moved to Hustad in 1953. The year before he had started a long working career at sea. From 1983 to 1997 he worked as a school teacher in Averøy Municipality.

He was a member of the Anders Lange Party when it started in the 1970s, later the Progress Party. He became mayor of Fræna Municipality in 2003, and served one term. He served as a deputy representative to the Parliament of Norway from Møre og Romsdal during the term 1997–2001.
