= Bud Church =

Church in Møre og Romsdal, Norway

- Bud kyrkje
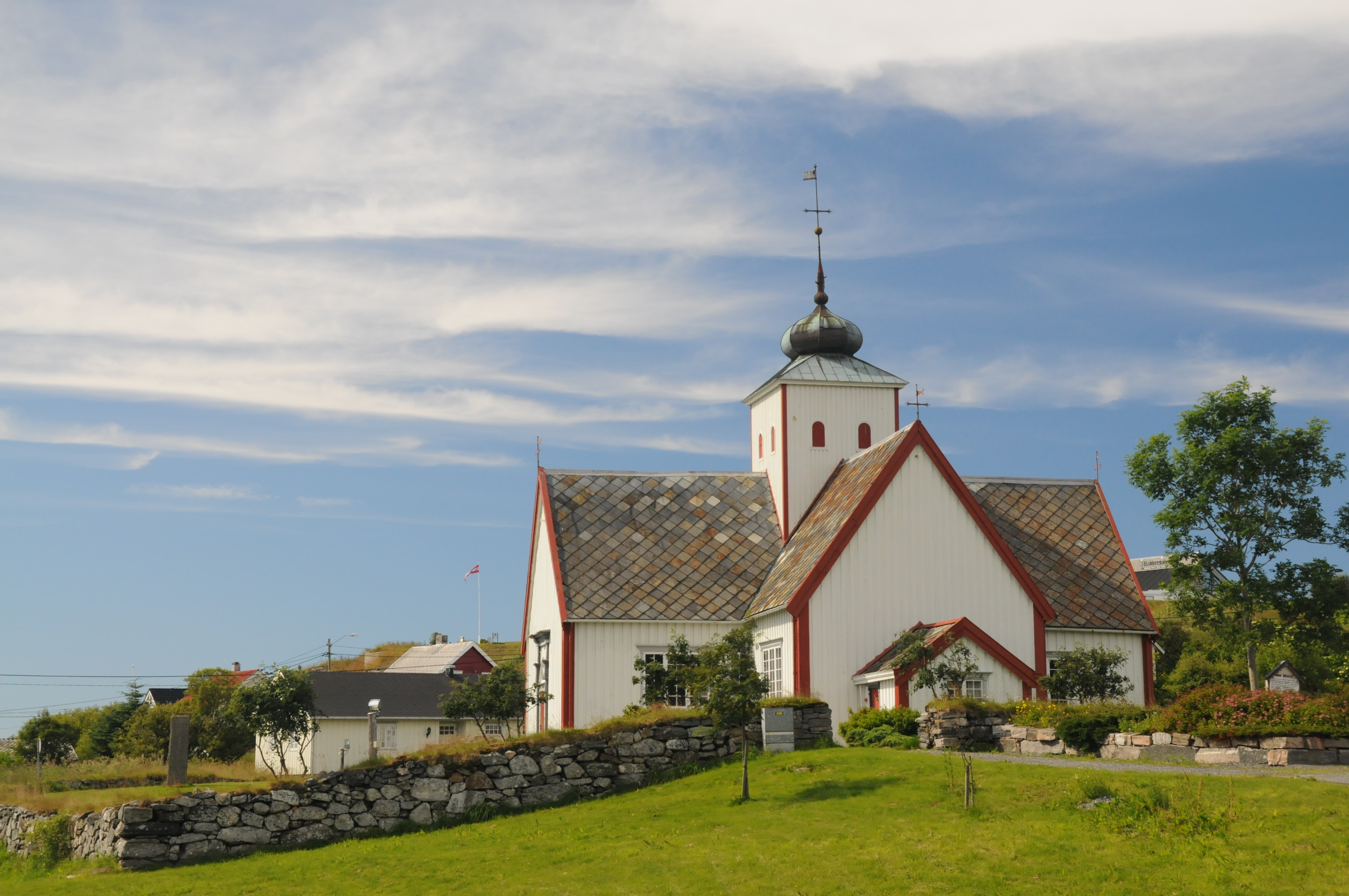
- View of the church
- Bud Church
- 62°54′29″N 6°54′38″E
- Location: Hustadvika Municipality, Møre og Romsdal
- Country: Norway
- Denomination: Church of Norway
- Churchmanship: Evangelical Lutheran

History
- Status: Parish church
- Founded: 14th century
- Consecrated: 1717

Architecture
- Functional status: Active
- Architect: Simon Paulsen
- Architectural type: Cruciform
- Completed: 1717 (309 years ago)

Specifications
- Capacity: 250
- Materials: Wood

Administration
- Diocese: Møre bispedømme
- Deanery: Molde domprosti
- Parish: Bud
- Norwegian Cultural Heritage Site
- Type: Church
- Status: Automatically protected
- ID: 83970

Bud Church (Norwegian: Bud kyrkje) is a parish church of the Church of Norway in Hustadvika Municipality in Møre og Romsdal county, Norway. It is located in the village of Bud on the northwestern shore of the Romsdal peninsula. It is the church for the Bud parish which is part of the Molde domprosti (arch-deanery) in the Diocese of Møre. The white, wooden church was built in a cruciform design in 1717 using plans drawn up by Simon Paulsen. The church has a unique onion-style dome and spire on top. The church seats about 250 people.

== History ==
The earliest existing historical records of the church date back to 1589, but it was built before that time. The first church in Bud was likely a small, wooden stave church that may have been built in the 14th century. That building was partially demolished in 1648 and during the rebuilding, it was expanded to the north and south by adding transepts to create a cruciform floor plan. The church burned down as a result of a lightning strike in 1709. It took some time before the church was replaced. Simon Paulsen was hired as the designer and lead builder for the new church. In 1717, a new wooden cruciform church was completed a short distance to the south of the old church site. The new building was consecrated that same year by the Bishop of the Diocese of Nidaros, Peder Krog.

In 1814, this church served as an election church (Norwegian: valgkirke). Together with more than 300 other parish churches across Norway, it was a polling station for elections to the 1814 Norwegian Constituent Assembly which wrote the Constitution of Norway. This was Norway's first national elections. Each church parish was a constituency that elected people called "electors" who later met together in each county to elect the representatives for the assembly that was to meet at Eidsvoll Manor later that year.

In 1832, the church had a fire which damaged the tower on the building. After the fire, the tower was rebuilt with a unique onion-style dome and spire on top. During World War II, the tower and dome were removed because they impeded the firing line of coastal cannons from the Ergan Fort nearby. After the war, the tower was rebuilt.

== Media gallery ==
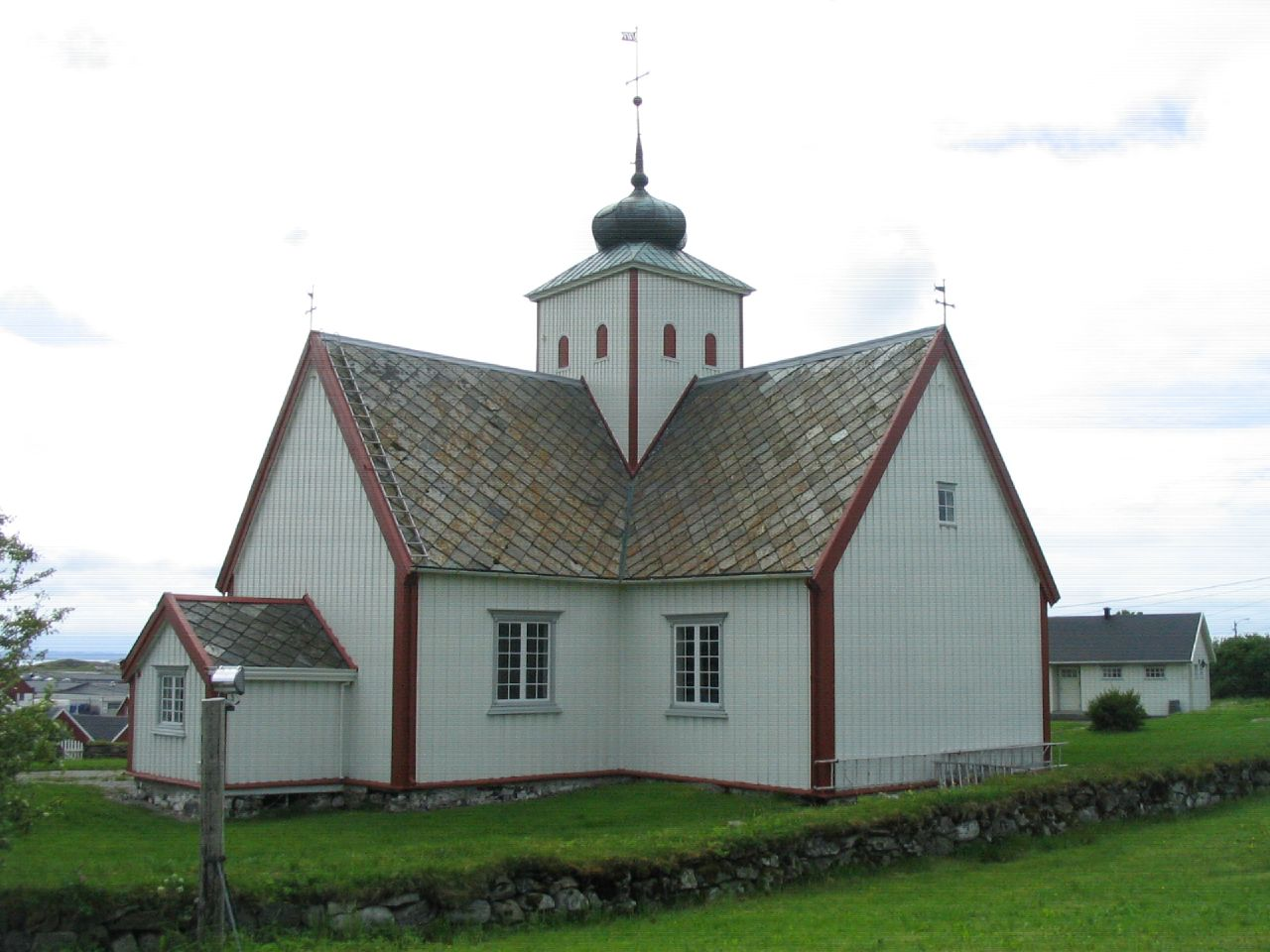

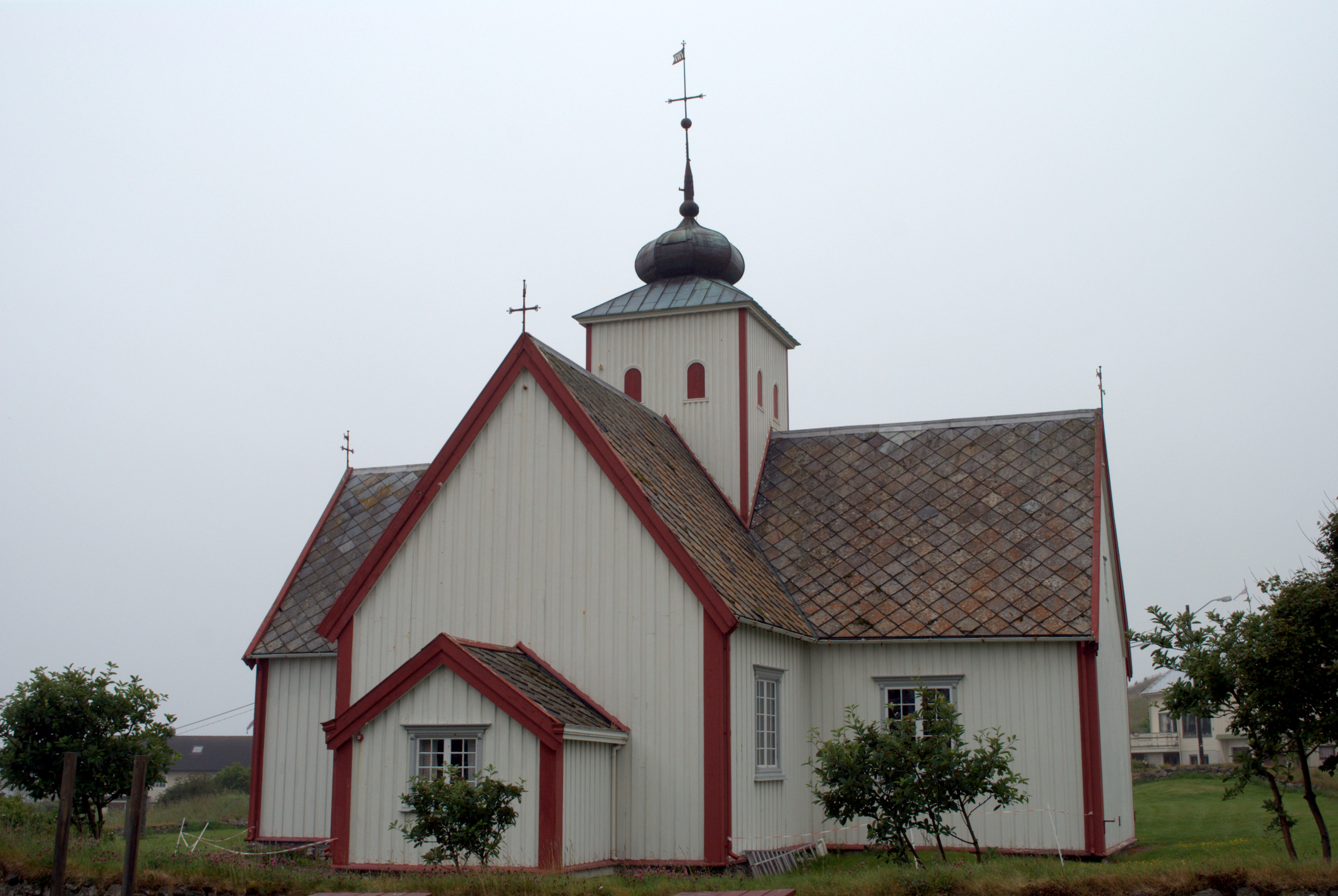

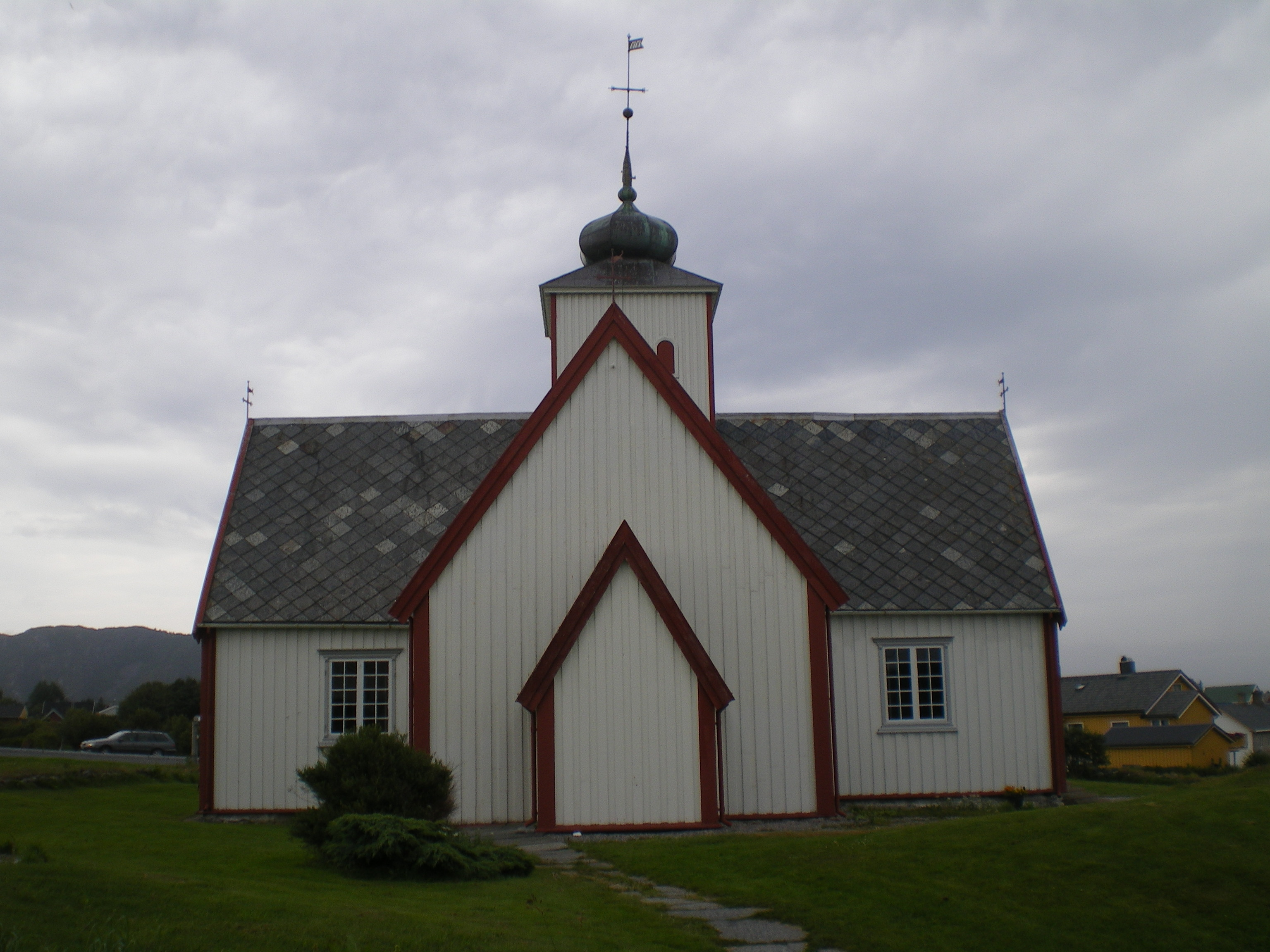

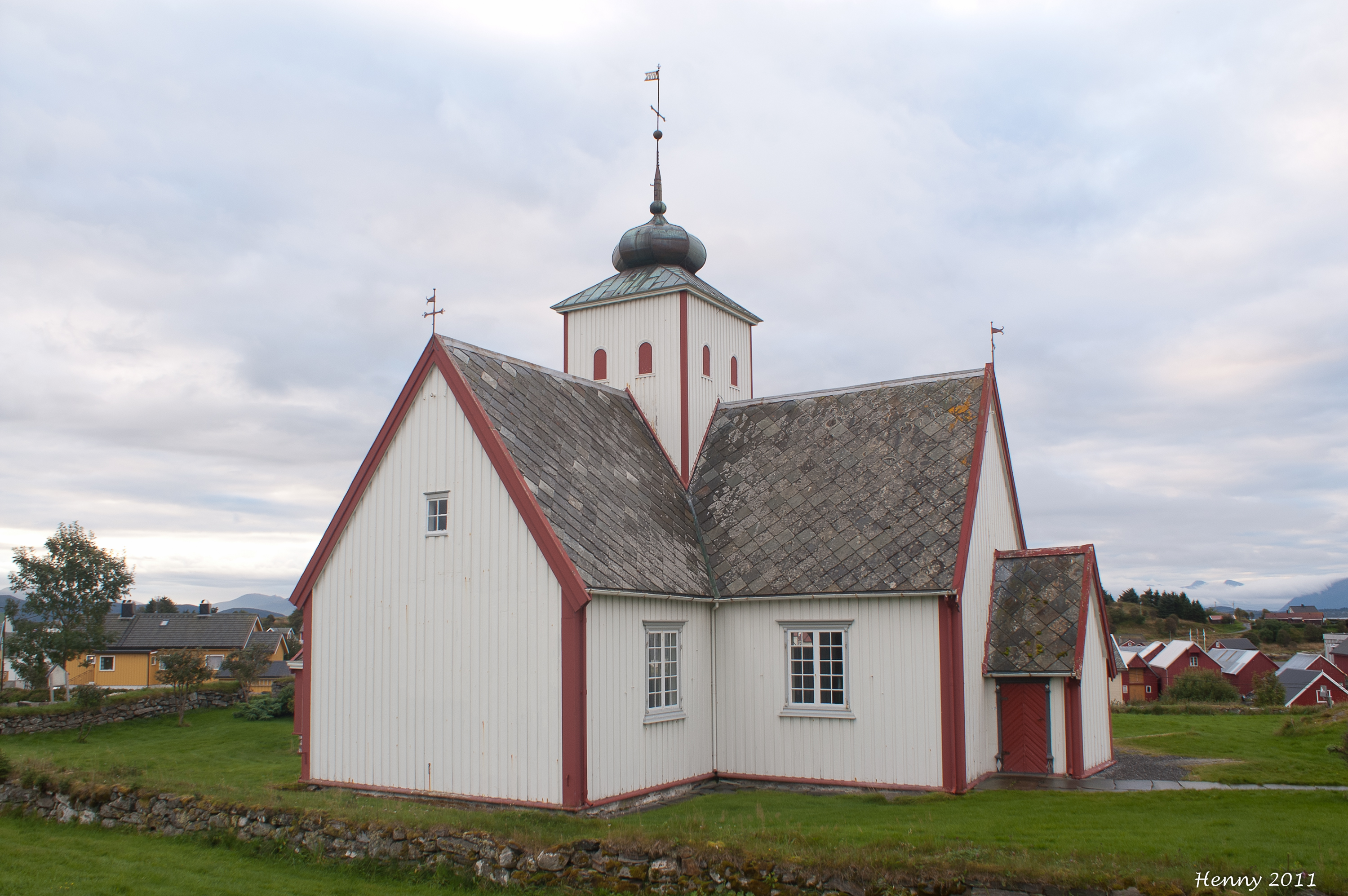

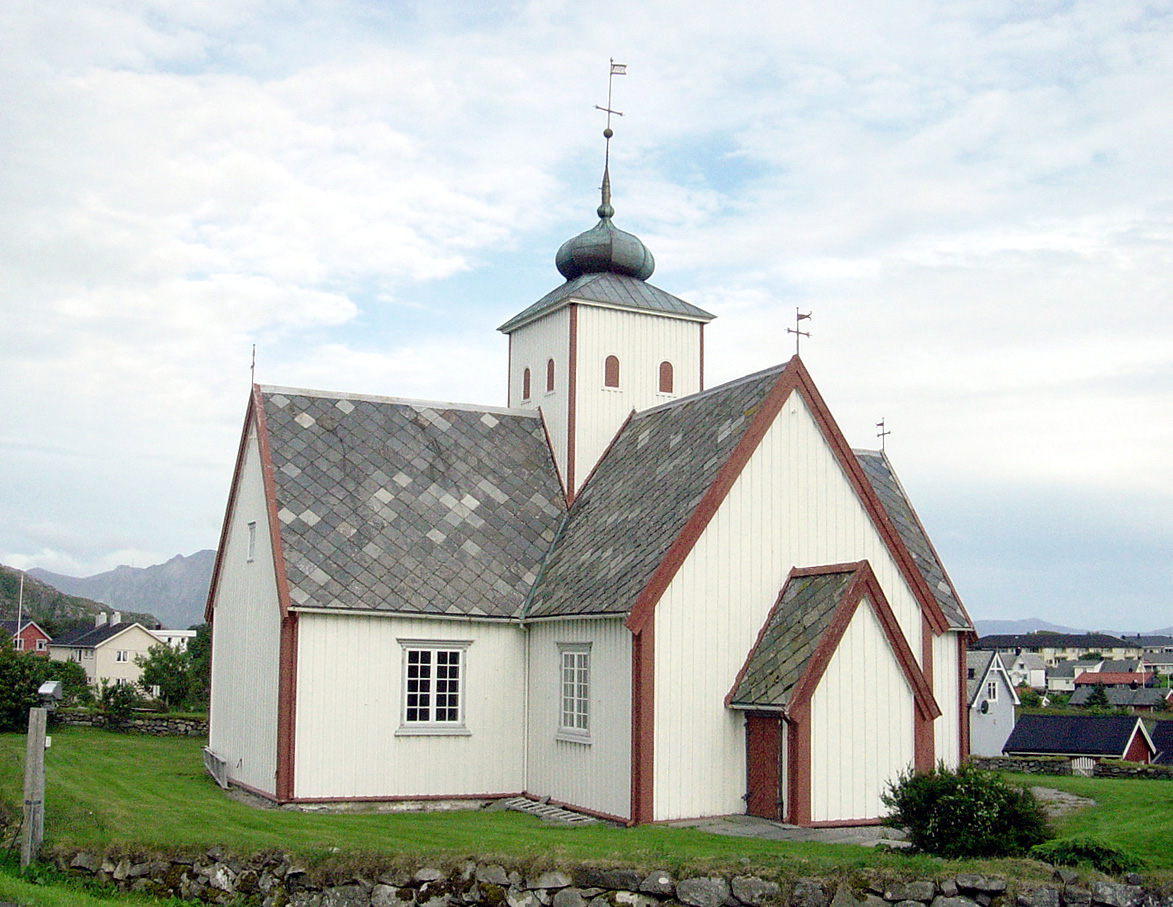

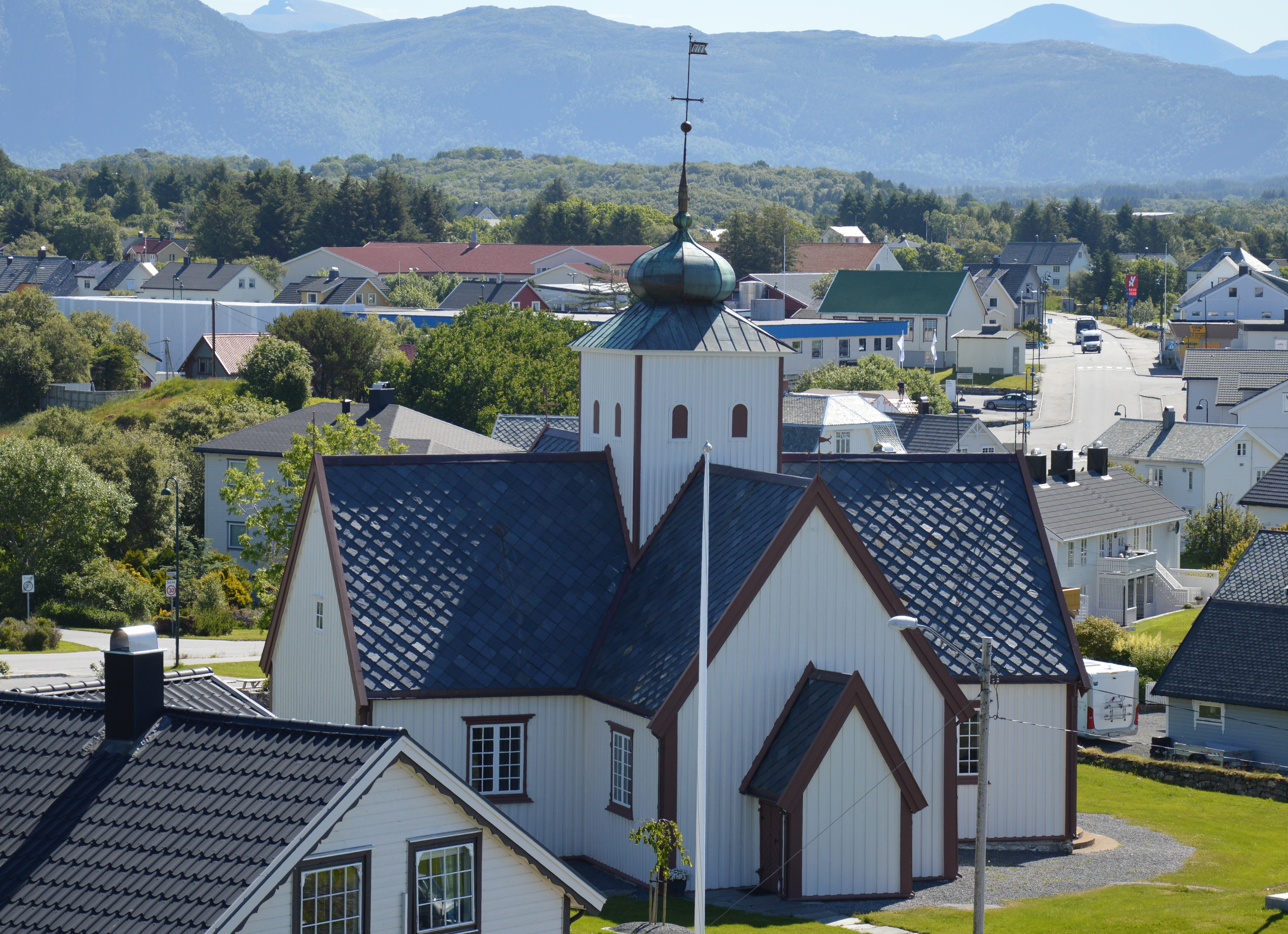

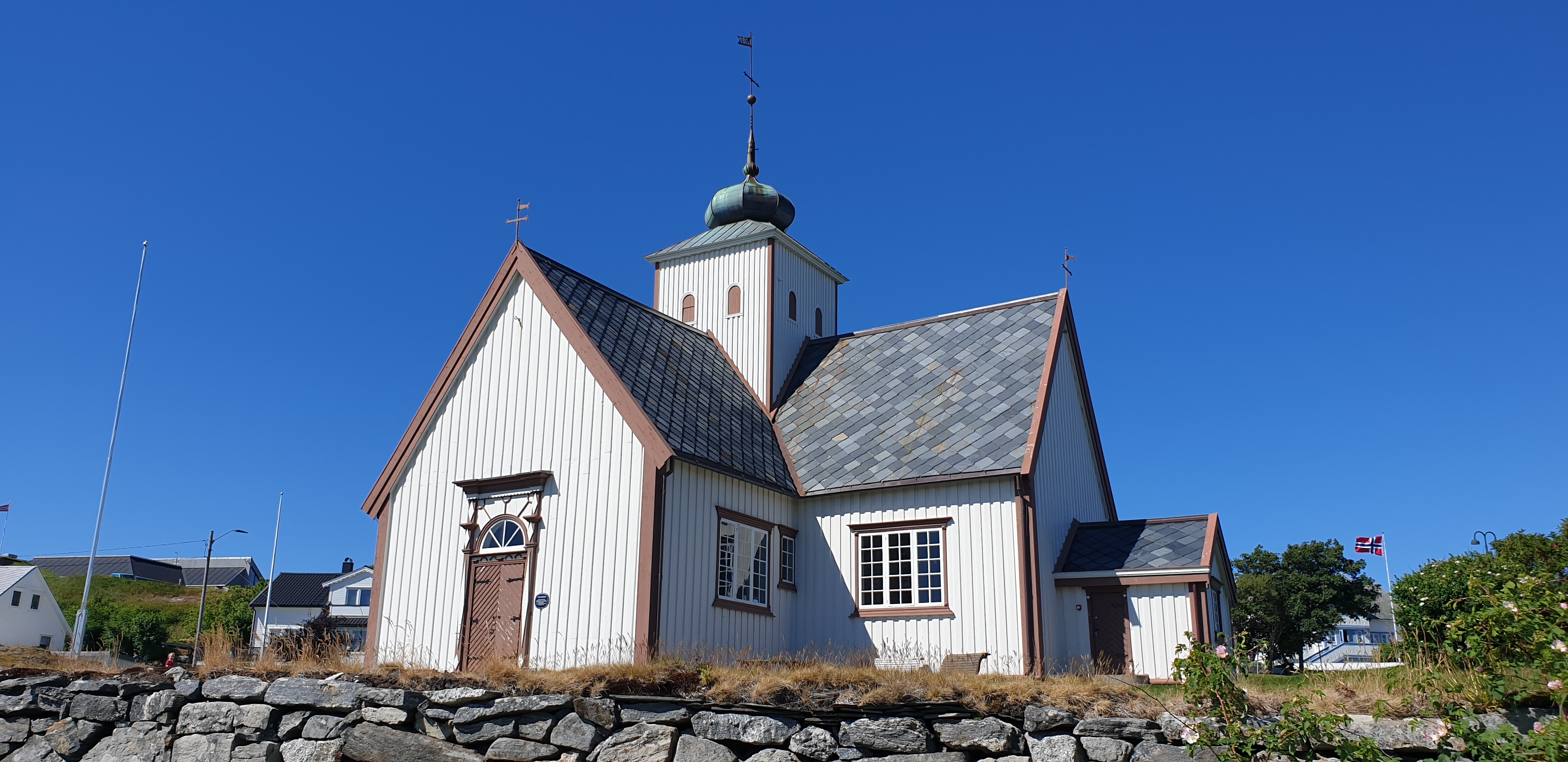

== See also ==
- List of churches in Møre
