= Hustadvika Municipality =

Municipality in Møre og Romsdal, Norway

Hustadvika Municipality Hustadvika kommune
- Municipality
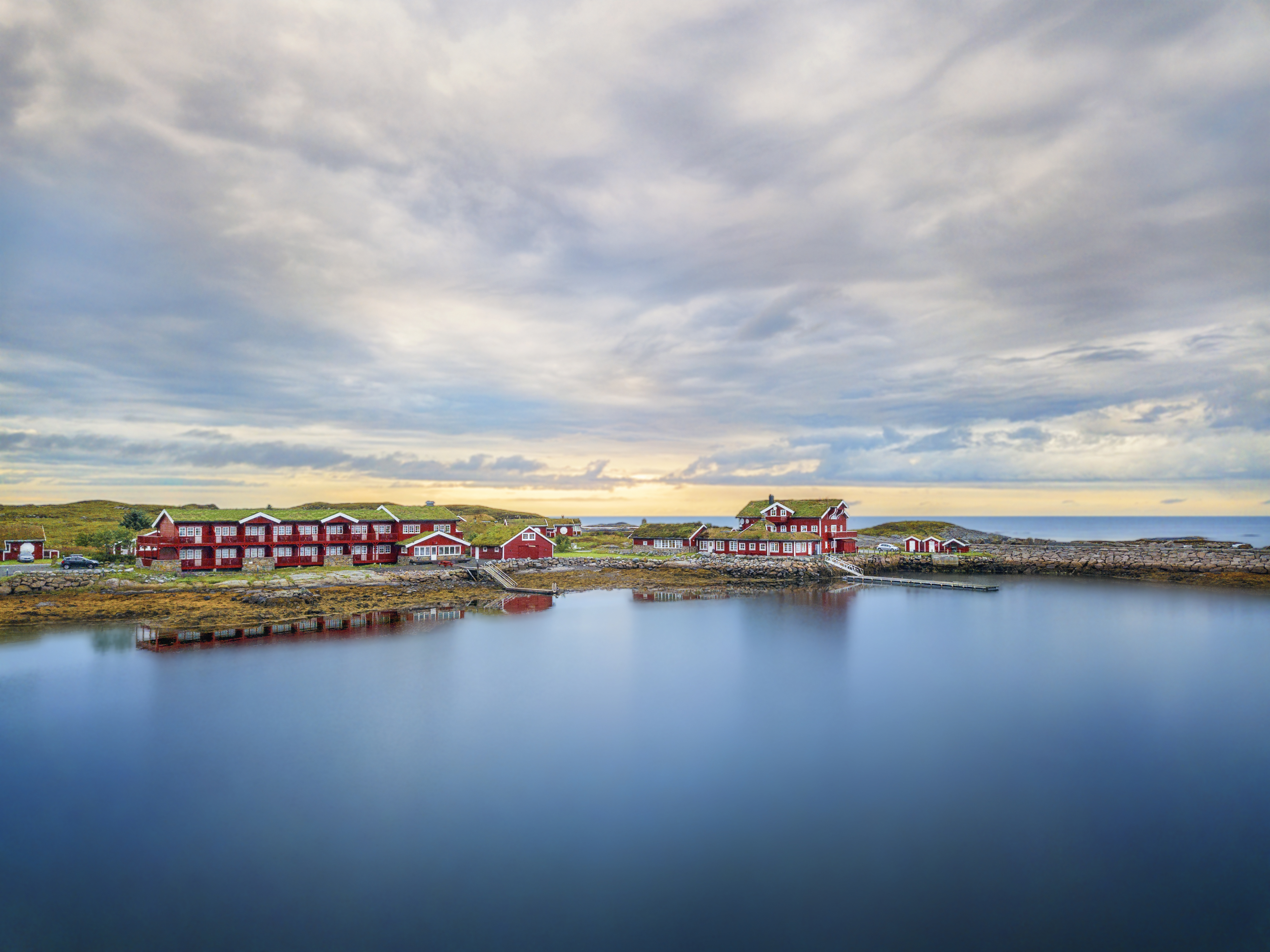
- View of a hotel on the Hustadvika shoreline

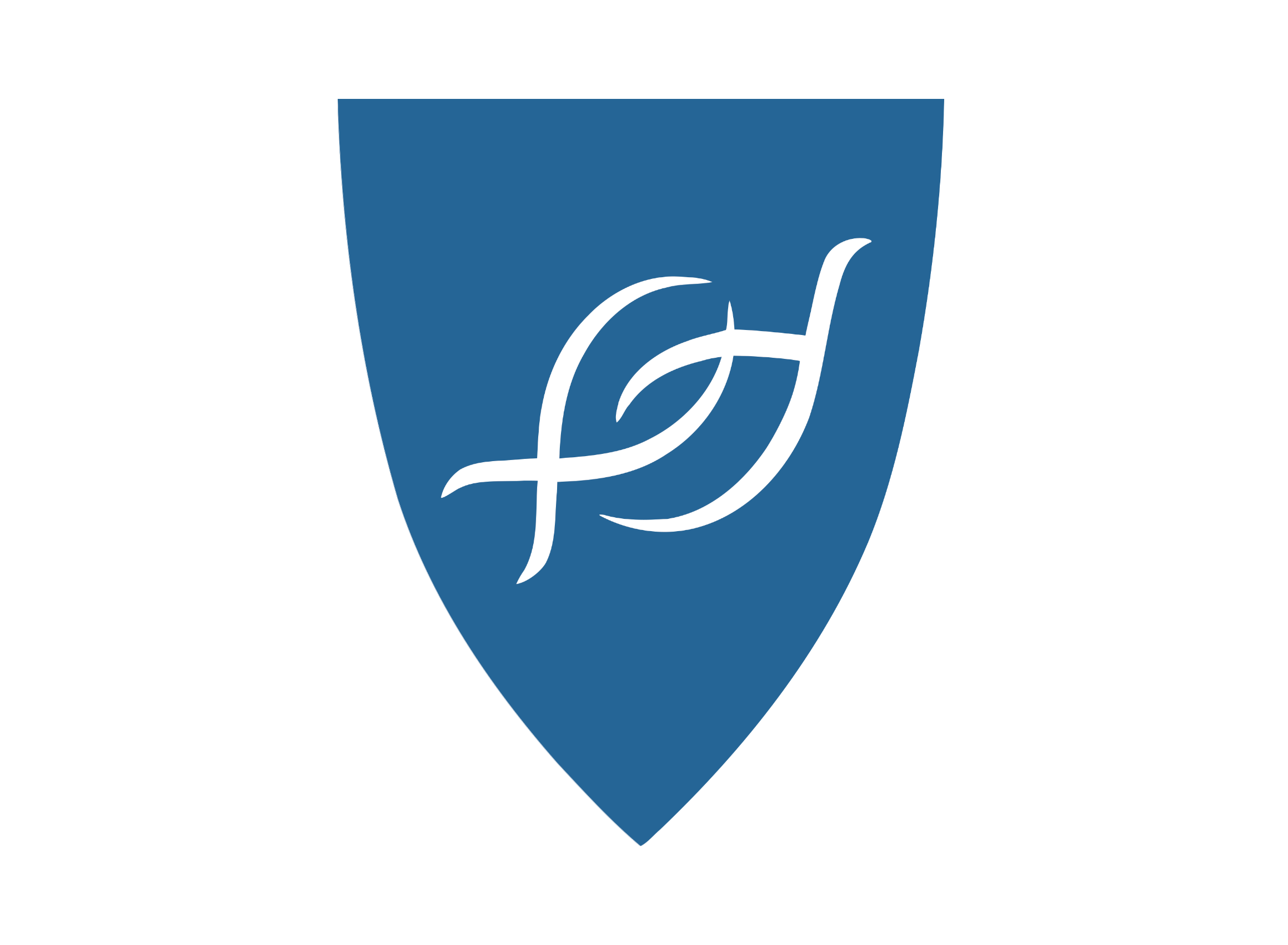
- Flag Coat of arms

- Møre og Romsdal within Norway

- Hustadvika within Møre og Romsdal
- Coordinates: 62.916796°N 7.227630°E
- Country: Norway
- County: Møre og Romsdal
- District: Nordmøre
- Established: 1 Jan 2020
  - Preceded by: Eide Municipality and Fræna Municipality
- Administrative centre: Elnesvågen

Government
  - Mayor (2023): Nils Christian Harnes (KrF)

Area
  - Total: 521.93 km^{2} (201.52 sq mi)
  - Land: 507.74 km^{2} (196.04 sq mi)
  - Water: 14.19 km^{2} (5.48 sq mi) 2.7%
  - Rank: #202 in Norway
- Highest elevation: 1,026.46 m (3,367.7 ft)

Population (2024)
  - Total: 13,437
  - Rank: #92 in Norway
  - Density: 25.7/km^{2} (67/sq mi)
  - Change (10 years): ▲ +1.9%
- Demonym: Hustadværing

Official language
  - Norwegian form: Neutral
- Time zone: UTC+01:00 (CET)
  - Summer (DST): UTC+02:00 (CEST)
- ISO 3166 code: NO-1579
- Website: Official website

Hustadvika is a municipality in Møre og Romsdal county, Norway. It is located in the traditional districts of Nordmøre and Romsdal. The administrative centre of the municipality is the village of Elnesvågen. Other villages in the municipality include Hustad, Bud, Tornes, Sylte, Malme, Aureosen, Eide, Lyngstad, Vevang, and Visnes.

The 522-square-kilometre (202 sq mi) municipality is the 202nd largest by area out of the 357 municipalities in Norway. Hustadvika Municipality is the 92nd most populous municipality in Norway with a population of 13,437. The municipality's population density is 25.7 inhabitants per square kilometre (67/sq mi) and its population has increased by 1.9% over the previous 10-year period.

== General information ==
On 1 January 2020, Eide Municipality (population: 3,400) and Fræna Municipality (population: 10,900) were merged to form the new Hustadvika Municipality. The borders have not changed since that time.

=== Name ===
The municipality is named after the 19-kilometre (12 mi) long Hustadvika coastline, located in the northern part of the municipality. The name is composed of two parts and it is reminiscent of the name for the former Hustad Municipality, which existed from 1918 until its dissolution in 1964. The first part of the current name comes from the old Hustad farm (Old Norse: Húsastadðir) since the first Hustad Church was built there. The first element of the farm name comes from the word hús which means "house". The last element of the farm name is the plural form of stadðr which means "place" or "village". The second part of the municipal name is vika (Old Norse: vík) which means "bay" or "cove".

=== Coat of arms ===
The coat of arms was approved on 17 October 2019. The official blazon is "Azure, a plow and fish argent". This means the arms have a blue field (background) and the charge is an artistic design reminiscent of an interlocking fish and plow. The charge has a tincture of argent which means it is commonly colored white, but if it is made out of metal, then silver is used. The design was chosen to symbolize the two main industries of the municipality: fishing and agriculture. The arms were designed by Madelen Behrendt and Øystein Hauge. The municipal flag has the same design as the coat of arms.

=== Churches ===
The Church of Norway has five parishes (sokn) within Hustadvika Municipality. It is part of the Molde domprosti (arch-deanery) in the Diocese of Møre.

Churches in Hustadvika Municipality
Parish (sokn)	Church name	Location of the church	Year built
Bud	Bud Church	Bud	1717
Eide	Eide Church	Eide	1871
Eide	Gaustad Chapel	Gaustad, near Vevang	2001
Hustad	Hustad Church	Hustad	1874
Myrbostad	Myrbostad Church	Elnesvågen	1880
Vågøy	Vågøy Church	Vågøya	1904

== Geography ==
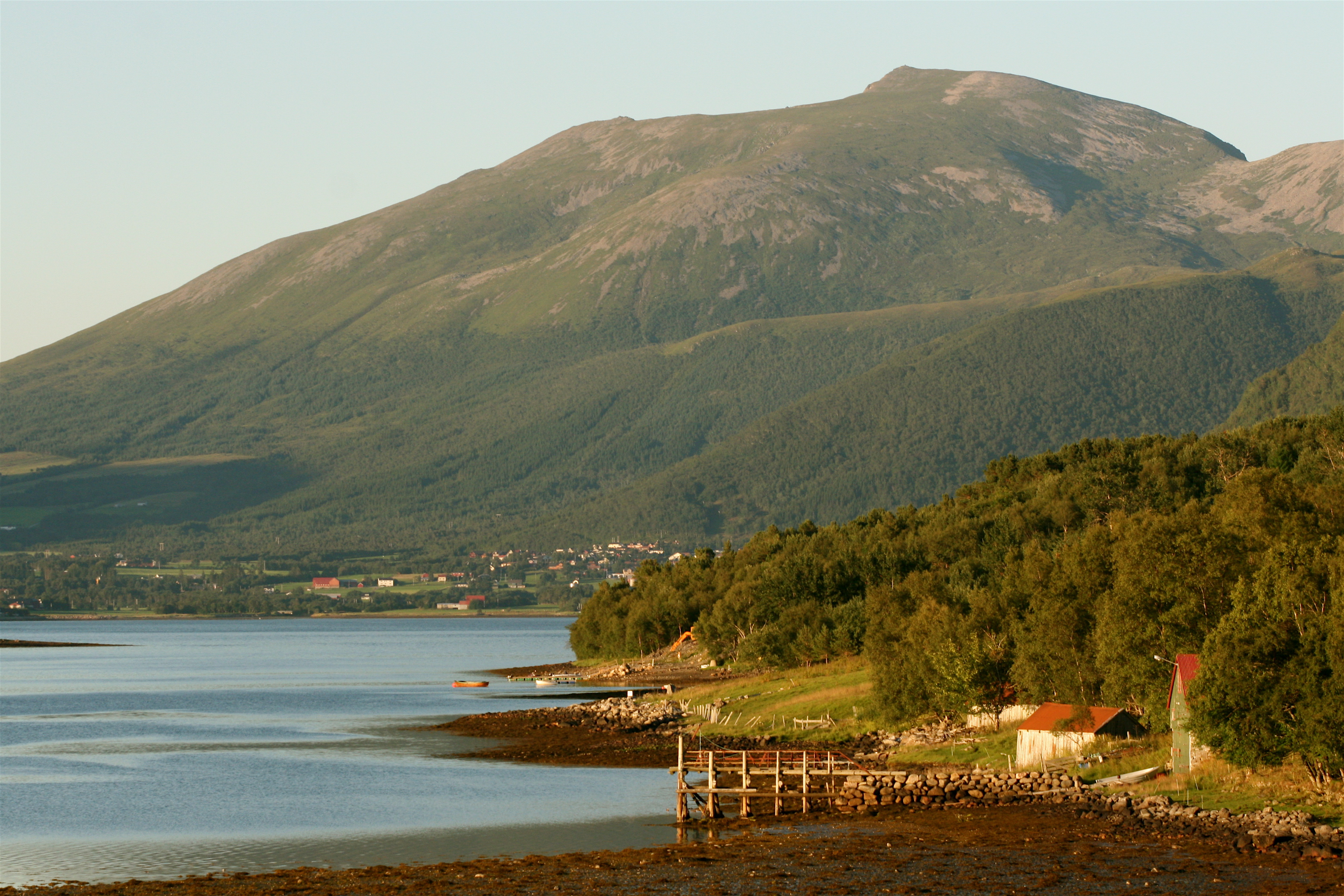
View of the village of Aureosen

The municipality of Hustadvika sits on the northwestern end of the Romsdal Peninsula along the Hustadvika shoreline, just west of the island of Averøya. The Norwegian Sea lies to the north, the Harøyfjorden, Julsundet strait, and Aukra Municipality lie to the west, Molde Municipality and Gjemnes Municipality lie to the south, and Averøy Municipality and the Kornstadfjorden lie to the east.

The Frænfjorden cuts into the middle of the municipality. The coastal areas are low and marshy while the interior of the municipality is mountainous. The highest point in the municipality is the 1,026.46-metre (3,367.7 ft) tall mountain Snøtinden on the border with Gjemnes Municipality. Other notable mountains include Jendemsfjellet Høgheitinden, and Lågheia. The Bjørnsund islands lie off the northwestern coast. They are now uninhabited, but the Bjørnsund Lighthouse is still in operation. Kvitholmen Lighthouse lies just off the northern coast of the municipality, in an area with hundreds of small islands and skerries.

== Government ==
Hustadvika Municipality is responsible for primary education (through 10th grade), outpatient health services, senior citizen services, welfare and other social services, zoning, economic development, and municipal roads and utilities. The municipality is governed by a municipal council of directly elected representatives. The mayor is indirectly elected by a vote of the municipal council. The municipality is under the jurisdiction of the Nordmøre og Romsdal District Court and the Frostating Court of Appeal. Waste management is provided by the inter-municipal agency Romsdalshalvøya Interkommunale Renovasjonsselskap.

=== Municipal council ===
The municipal council (Kommunestyre) of Hustadvika Municipality is made up of 33 representatives that are elected to four-year terms. The tables below show the current and historical composition of the council by political party.

Hustadvika kommunestyre 2023–2027
Party name (in Norwegian)	Number of representatives
Labour Party (Arbeiderpartiet)	6
Progress Party (Fremskrittspartiet)	6
Conservative Party (Høyre)	7
Industry and Business Party (Industri‑ og Næringspartiet)	3
Christian Democratic Party (Kristelig Folkeparti)	3
Centre Party (Senterpartiet)	6
Socialist Left Party (Sosialistisk Venstreparti)	1
Liberal Party (Venstre)	1
Total number of members:	33

Hustadvika kommunestyre 2020–2023
Party name (in Norwegian)	Number of representatives
Labour Party (Arbeiderpartiet)	7
Progress Party (Fremskrittspartiet)	4
Green Party (Miljøpartiet De Grønne)	1
Conservative Party (Høyre)	5
Christian Democratic Party (Kristelig Folkeparti)	2
Centre Party (Senterpartiet)	16
Socialist Left Party (Sosialistisk Venstreparti)	1
Liberal Party (Venstre)	1
Total number of members:	37

=== Mayors ===
The mayor (Norwegian: ordfører) of Hustadvika Municipality is the political leader of the municipality and the chairperson of the municipal council. Here is a list of people who have held this position:

- 2020–2023: Tove Henøen (Sp)
- 2023–present: Nils Christian Harnes (KrF)

== Notable people ==
- Oluf Gjerset (1848 in Vaagø – 1941), an American politician and mayor of Montevideo, Minnesota
- Nilmar Janbu (1921 in Bjørnsund – 2013), an engineer and geotechnician
- Arve Hans Otterlei (born 1932), a politician and mayor of Fræna Municipality in 2003; lived in Hustad
- Trond Strande (born 1970), a former footballer with 275 club caps with Molde FK; he was brought up in Elnesvågen
- Jim Svenøy (born 1972 in Fræna), a retired athlete who ran the 3,000-metre (9,800 ft) steeplechase
- Jorun Marie Kvernberg (born 1979 in Fræna), a musician, singer, and composer who plays the hardingfele and violin
- Ola Kvernberg (born 1981 in Fræna), a jazz musician who plays string swing violin
