= Hustad (surname) =

Hustad is a Norwegian surname which may refer to:

- Donald Hustad (1918–2013), American composer of Christian music
- Jon Hustad (1968–2023), Norwegian journalist and writer
- Tormod Kristoffer Hustad (1889–1973), Norwegian councillor of state and minister in the pro-Nazi government of Vidkun Quisling
