= Kvitholmen Lighthouse =

Coastal lighthouse in Hustadvika, Norway

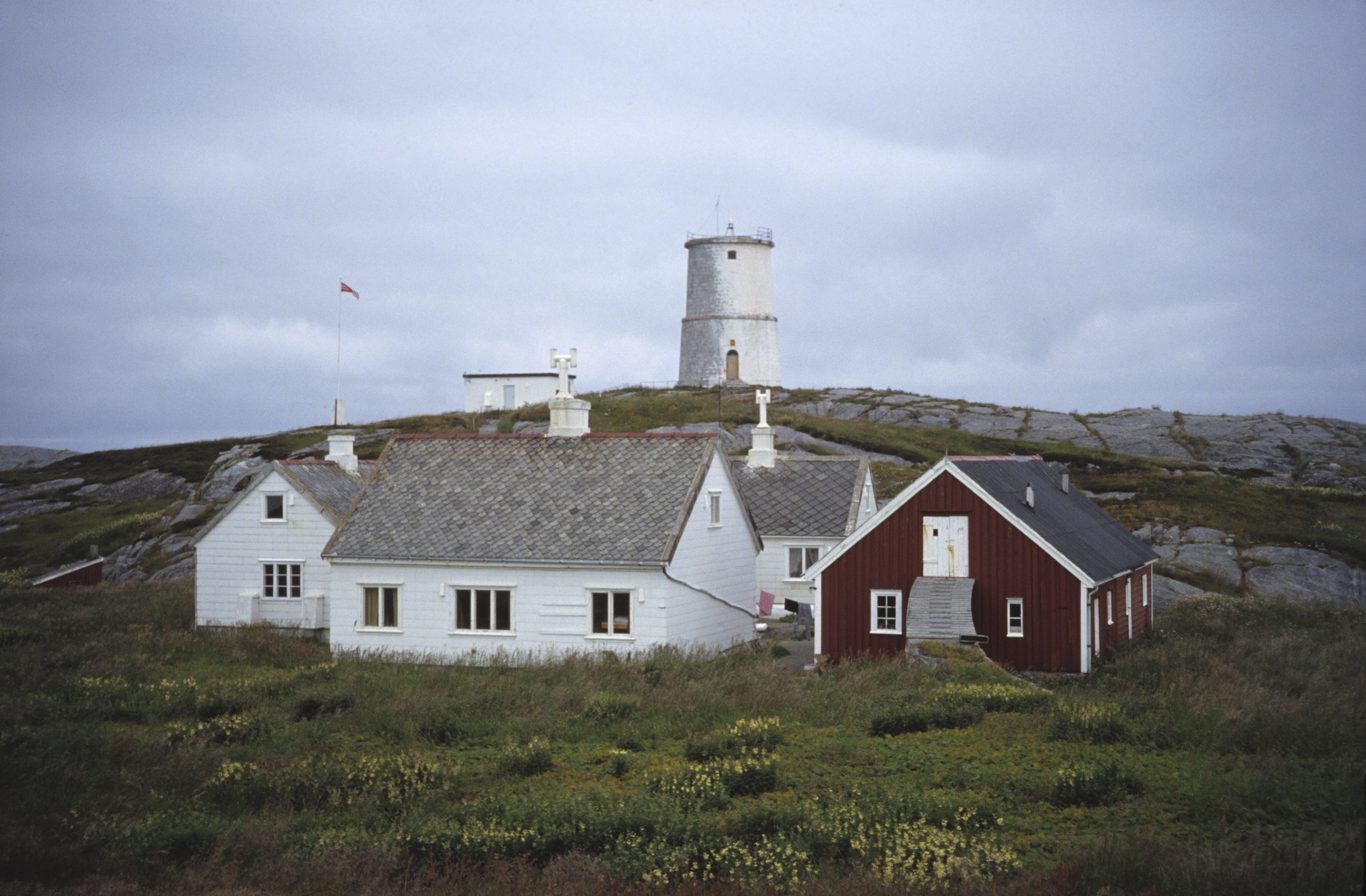
- Kvitholmen Lighthouse. Stone tower from 1842 and associated buildings
- Location: Møre og Romsdal; Norway
- Coordinates: 63°01′23″N 07°14′05.3″E

Tower
- Constructed: 1956
- Construction: concrete tower
- Automated: 1990
- Height: 12 metres (39 ft)
- Shape: cylindrical tower with gallery and lantern
- Markings: white tower, red lantern and roof
- Racon: O

Light
- First lit: 1956
- Focal height: 25 metres (82 ft)
- Intensity: 39,100 candela
- Range: 17.5 nmi (32.4 km; 20.1 mi)
- Characteristic: Oc WRG 6s
- Original light
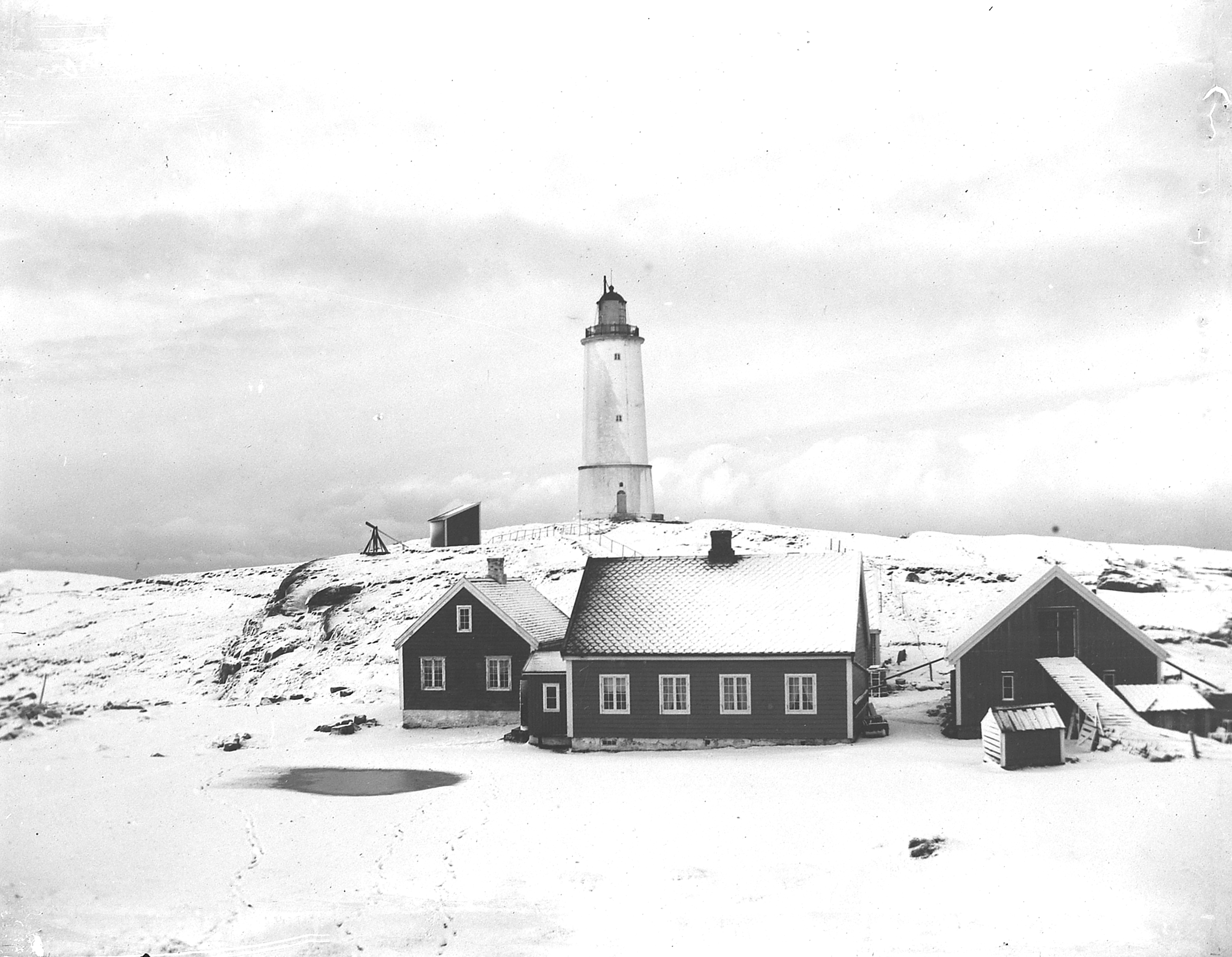
- Constructed: 1842
- Construction: stone (tower)
- Height: 12 m (39 ft)
- Heritage: cultural heritage preservation in Norway

Kvitholmen Lighthouse (Norwegian: Kvitholmen fyr) is a coastal lighthouse located in Hustadvika Municipality in Møre og Romsdal county, Norway. It is located on the island of Kvitholmen, about 2 kilometres (1.2 mi) off the mainland coast of Eide Municipality. The lighthouse was established in 1842, rebuilt in 1956, and automated in 1990.

The present lighthouse sits on top of a 12-metre (39 ft) tall white concrete tower with a red top. The light sits at an elevation of 25 metres (82 ft) above sea level. The light emits a white, red, or green light (depending on direction) occulting once every 6 seconds. The 39,100 candela light can be seen for up to 17.5 nmi (32.4 km; 20.1 mi). The light is in operation from 16 July until 21 May every year. The light is shut off during the summers due to the midnight sun. The present lighthouse sits right next to the historic tower that was built in 1842. In 1956 the present tower was built to replace the old stone tower.

== See also ==
- Lighthouses in Norway
- List of lighthouses in Norway
