= Torunn Janbu =

Norwegian physician (born 1954)

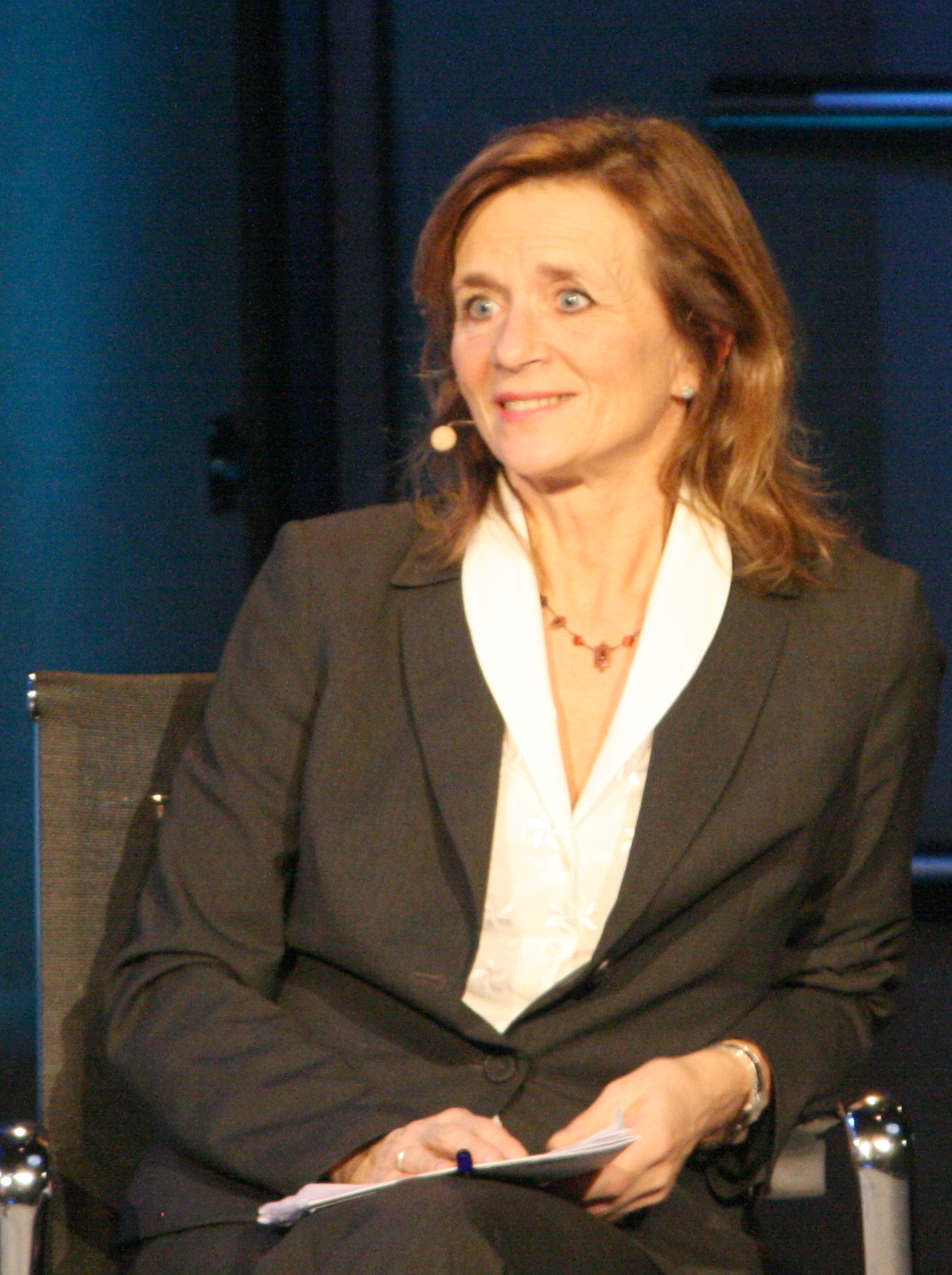
Norwegian physician Torunn Janbu

Torunn Janbu (born 26 November 1954) is a Norwegian physician. The president of the Norwegian Medical Association from 2005 until 2011, she became the first female president in the history of the organization upon election in 2005. She attained her Candidate of Medicine degree at the University of Oslo in 1979.

== Personal life ==
She is married to politician and physician Kjell Maartmann-Moe.

| Preceded by Hans Kristian Bakke | President of the Norwegian Medical Association; 2005–present | Incumbent |
