= Nilmar Janbu =

- Born: 23 August 1921; Bjørnsund, Fræna Municipality, Norway
- Died: 4 January 2013 (aged 91)
- Occupations: Engineer; Geotechnician

Nilmar Oskar Charles Janbu (23 August 1921 – 4 January 2013) was a Norwegian engineer and geotechnician.

He was born in Fræna Municipality. He graduated in civil engineering from the Norwegian Institute of Technology in 1947, and in geotechnics from Harvard University in 1949. His dr. thesis from 1954 was titled Stability analysis of slopes with dimensionless parameters. He was appointed professor of geotechnics at the Norwegian Institute of Technology from 1961. He was Rankine Lecturer 1985, discussing solutions to problems in offshore engineering.

He died in 2013.
