= Hustad Church (Møre og Romsdal) =

Church in Møre og Romsdal, Norway

- Hustad kyrkje
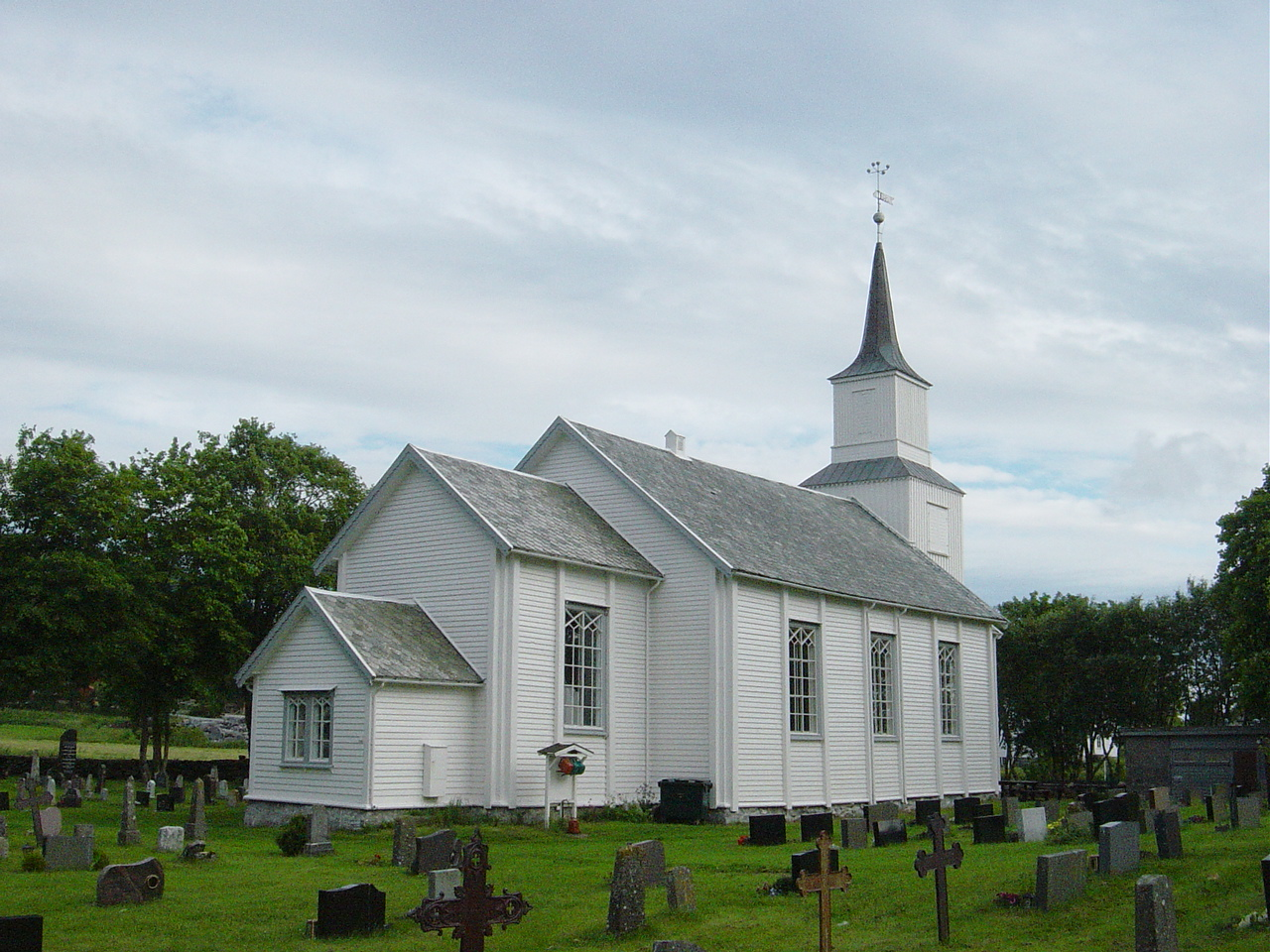
- View of the church
- Hustad Church
- 62°57′22″N 7°05′50″E
- Location: Hustadvika Municipality, Møre og Romsdal
- Country: Norway
- Denomination: Church of Norway
- Churchmanship: Evangelical Lutheran

History
- Status: Parish church
- Founded: 12th century
- Consecrated: 1875

Architecture
- Functional status: Active
- Architect: Jacob Wilhelm Nordan
- Architectural type: Long church
- Completed: 1874 (152 years ago)

Specifications
- Capacity: 400
- Materials: Wood

Administration
- Diocese: Møre bispedømme
- Deanery: Molde domprosti
- Parish: Hustad
- Norwegian Cultural Heritage Site
- Type: Church
- Status: Not protected

Hustad Church (Norwegian: Hustad kyrkje) is a parish church of the Church of Norway in Hustadvika Municipality in Møre og Romsdal county, Norway. It is located in the village of Hustad along the Hustadvika coast. It is the church for the Hustad parish which is part of the Molde domprosti (arch-deanery) in the Diocese of Møre. The white, wooden church was built in a long church design in 1874 using plans drawn up by the architect Jacob Wilhelm Nordan. The church seats about 400 people.

== History ==
The earliest existing historical records of the church date back to 1589, but that was not the year the church was constructed. The first church in Hustad was a stave church that was likely built in the 12th century. The church stood about 60 metres (200 ft) northwest of the present church site. The church is located on the Hustad farm which is mentioned in 1123 in the Soga om Magnussønene (the saga of the sons of Magnus) in the Heimskringla when the story tells about how King Øystein died suddenly at Hustad.

At some point, the stave church had deteriorated and a new timber-framed church was built next to it. In 1646, records show that both the old and new churches were still standing near each other. The timber-framed church had a cruciform design. At some point, the old stave church was torn down. In 1718, a lightning strike caused the church to burn down and it took 20 years before it was replaced. In 1738, a new cruciform church was built on the same site. The nave of the new building measured 15.7 by 14.5 metres (52 ft × 48 ft). In the 1870s, the church was found to be too small for the congregation, so it was torn down and its materials were auctioned off. The pulpit was sent to the Sandvig Collections (Sandvigske Samlinger) at the Nordic Museum in Maihaugen in Lillehammer Municipality. The pulpit was later moved to the Garmo Stave Church.

A new, larger church was built in 1874. The new church was built about 60 metres (200 ft) southeast of the old church site, right outside the old cemetery which surrounded the old church. The church bell and the brass baptismal font from the old 1738 church were saved and installed in the new church. The new church was designed by Jacob Wilhelm Nordan and it was built by the master carpenter Jacob Digre. The new building was consecrated in 1875.

== Media gallery ==
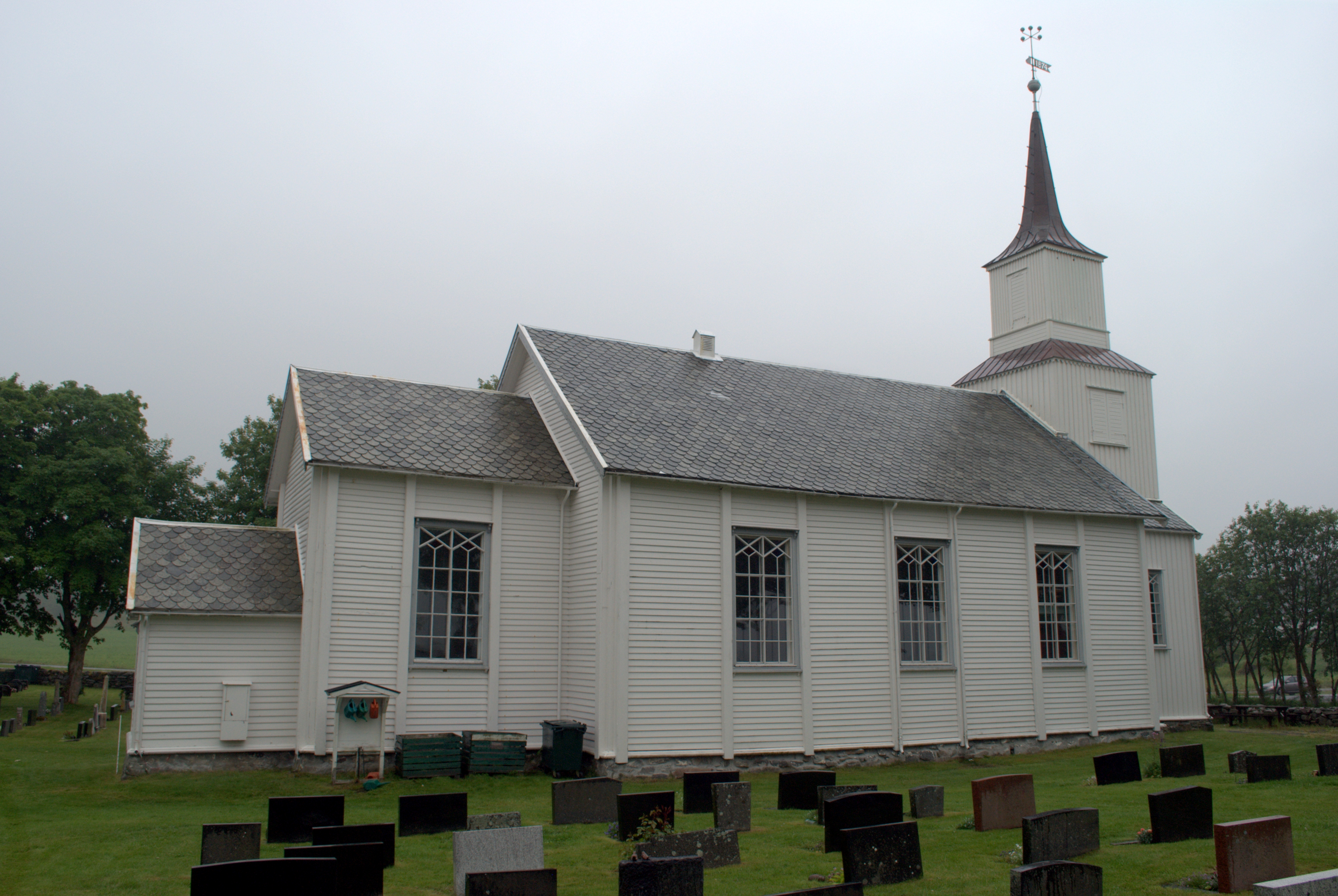

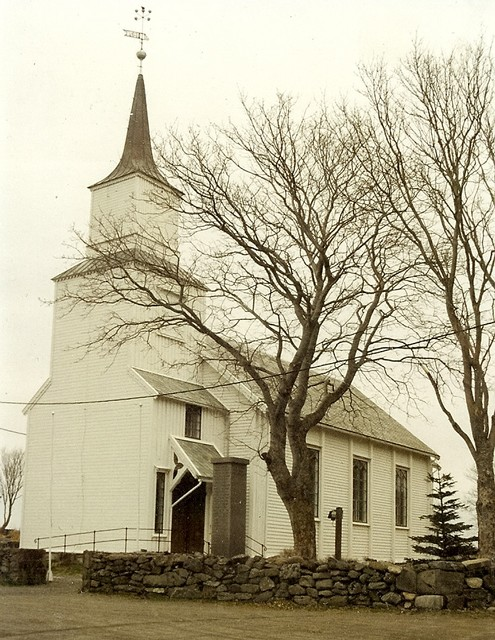

== See also ==
- List of churches in Møre
