= Bjørnsund =

Island in Møre og Romsdal, Norway

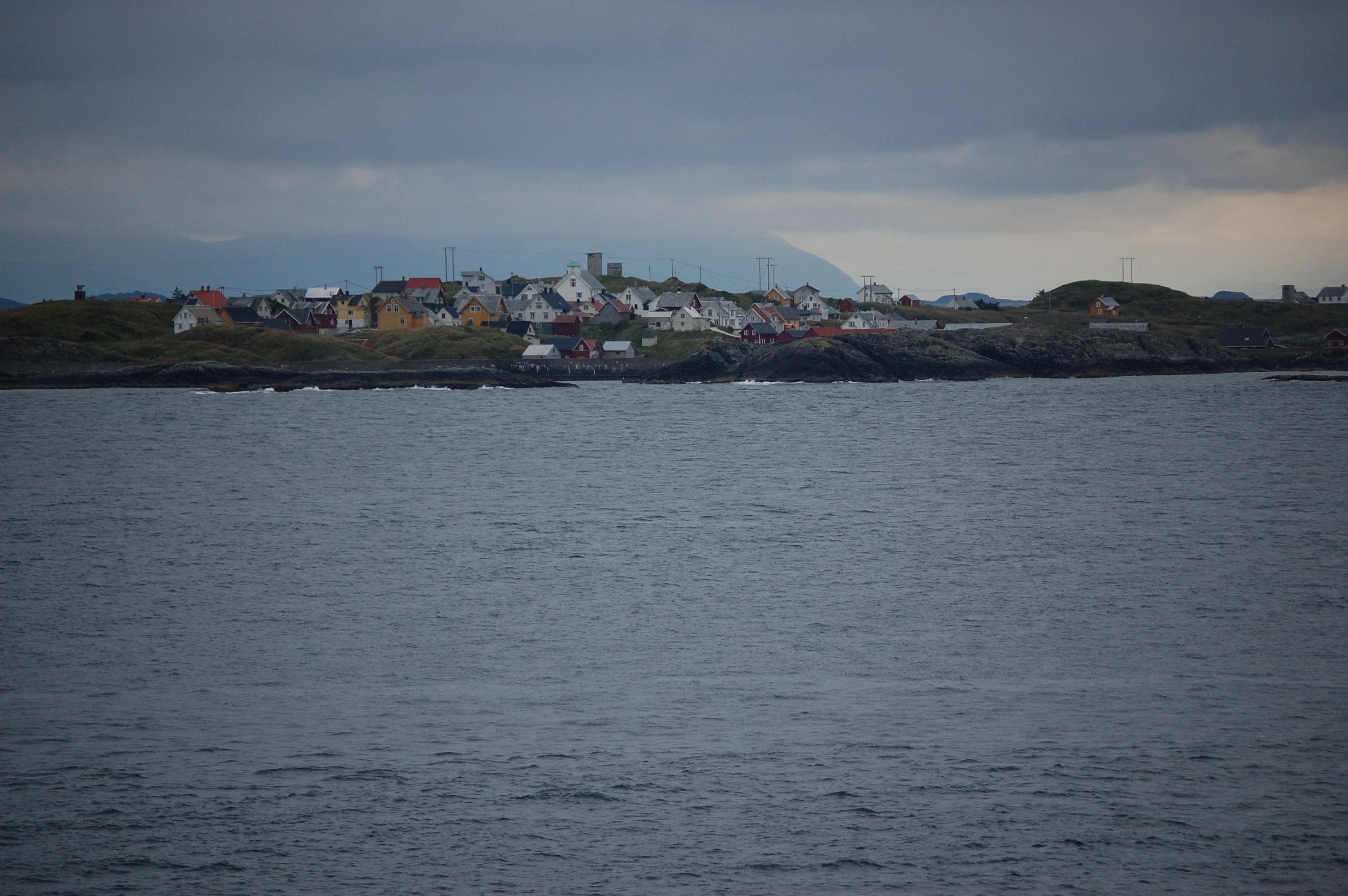
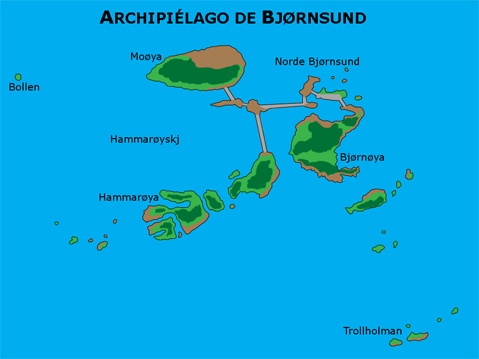
- View of the islands Map of the islands
- Interactive map of Bjørnsund

Geography
- Location: Møre og Romsdal, Norway
- Coordinates: 62.8876°N 6.8130°E

Administration
- Norway
- County: Møre og Romsdal
- Municipality: Hustadvika Municipality

Demographics
- Population: 0 (2010)

Bjørnsund is an island group located about 5 kilometres (3.1 mi) west of the village of Bud in Hustadvika Municipality in Møre og Romsdal county, Norway. Located north of the island of Gossa in the Hustadvika coastal area, the main islands are connected via bridges and viaducts. The Bjørnsund Lighthouse is located on the northern island of Moøya.

== History ==
Since 1971, the islands have had no full-time residents, and are now used only as summer homes. The municipal council controversially decided in 1968 that the islands should be abandoned rather than upgrade the islands' infrastructure. Children had to leave the islands for their secondary schooling also. Just after World War II, the islands were home to 500-600 residents.

== See also ==
- List of islands of Norway
