= Hustad =

Village in Hustadvika Municipality, Norway

- Village
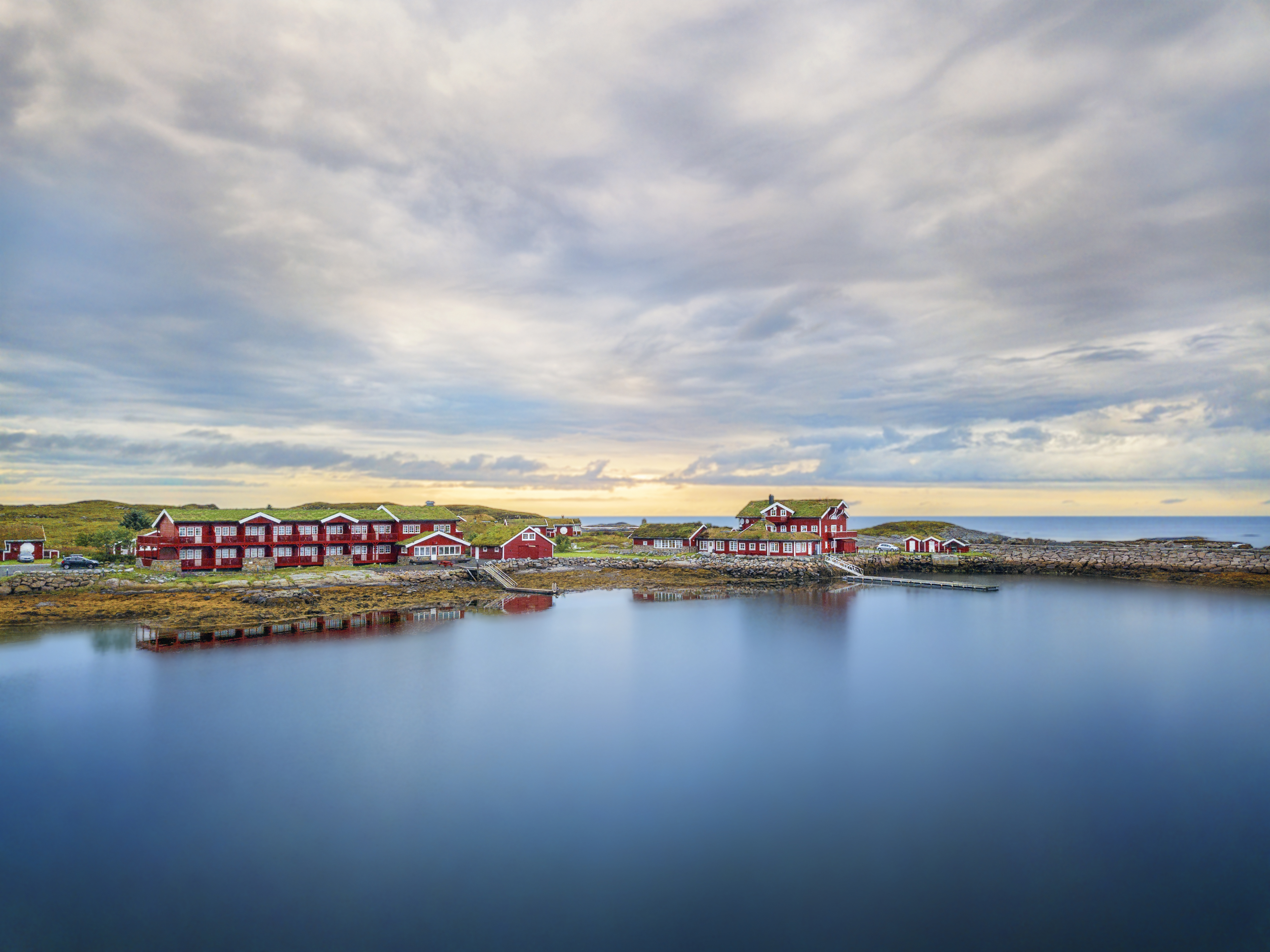
- View of a hotel, just outside the village
- Interactive map of Hustad
- Location within Møre og Romsdal Location within Norway
- Coordinates: 62.9540°N 7.0950°E
- Country: Norway
- Region: Western Norway
- County: Møre og Romsdal
- District: Romsdal
- Municipality: Hustadvika Municipality
- Elevation: 13 m (43 ft)
- Time zone: UTC+01:00 (CET)
  - Summer (DST): UTC+02:00 (CEST)
- Post Code: 6433 Hustad

Hustad is a village in Hustadvika Municipality in Møre og Romsdal county, Norway. It lies along the Hustadvika coastal area. The village of Hustad is located in the Nerland urban area which covers about 0.25 square kilometres (62 acres) and has a population (2013) of 249.

Hustad is a thriving village with food stores, a bank, parking facilities, and several other businesses. Hustad has the Stemshest mountains to the east and five lakes nearby are well-stocked with trout. There are also numerous hiking paths such as the famous Atlantic Ocean Road which is located just 8 kilometres (5.0 mi) to the northeast. Hustad Church is located in the village.

== History ==
Hustad is a former royal estate and noble seat that was located along the Hustadvika coast. The royal estate was first mentioned in 1122-1123 when King Øystein Magnusson died here. The estate came into the possession of the Rosenkrantz family in the 16th century and later belonged to governor Christoffer Urne and then Johan Frimann. In 1713, the then owner, the priest Knud Mann, left the estate to Reknes Hospital. Hustad was then divided into a number of farms, and all traces of the main estate are gone today.
