= Romsdalshalvøya =

Peninsula in Romsdal, Norway

Romsdalshalvøya Romsdal Peninsula
- Peninsula
- Interactive map of the peninsula
- Coordinates: 62.8390°N 7.4740°E
- Location: Møre og Romsdal, Norway

Area
  - Total: 1,560 km^{2} (600 sq mi)

Romsdalshalvøya, sometimes translated as the Romsdal Peninsula, is a 1,560-square-kilometre (600 sq mi) peninsula located in the Romsdal district of Møre og Romsdal county in Norway. The peninsula encompasses parts of Molde Municipality, Gjemnes Municipality, and Hustadvika Municipality.

The peninsula is connected to the mainland by a 5-kilometre (3.1 mi) wide isthmus between the villages of Eidsvåg and Eidsøra in Molde Municipality. The peninsula is flanked by a number of fjords: Langfjorden and Romsdalsfjorden to the south, Julsund (to the west), Hustadvika to the north, Kornstadfjorden and Kvernesfjorden to the north-east, and Tingvollfjorden and Sunndalsfjorden to the east.

About 42,000 people live on the peninsula, with another 5,000 on the adjacent islands.
