= Hustadvika =

Shipping route in Norway

- Coastal area
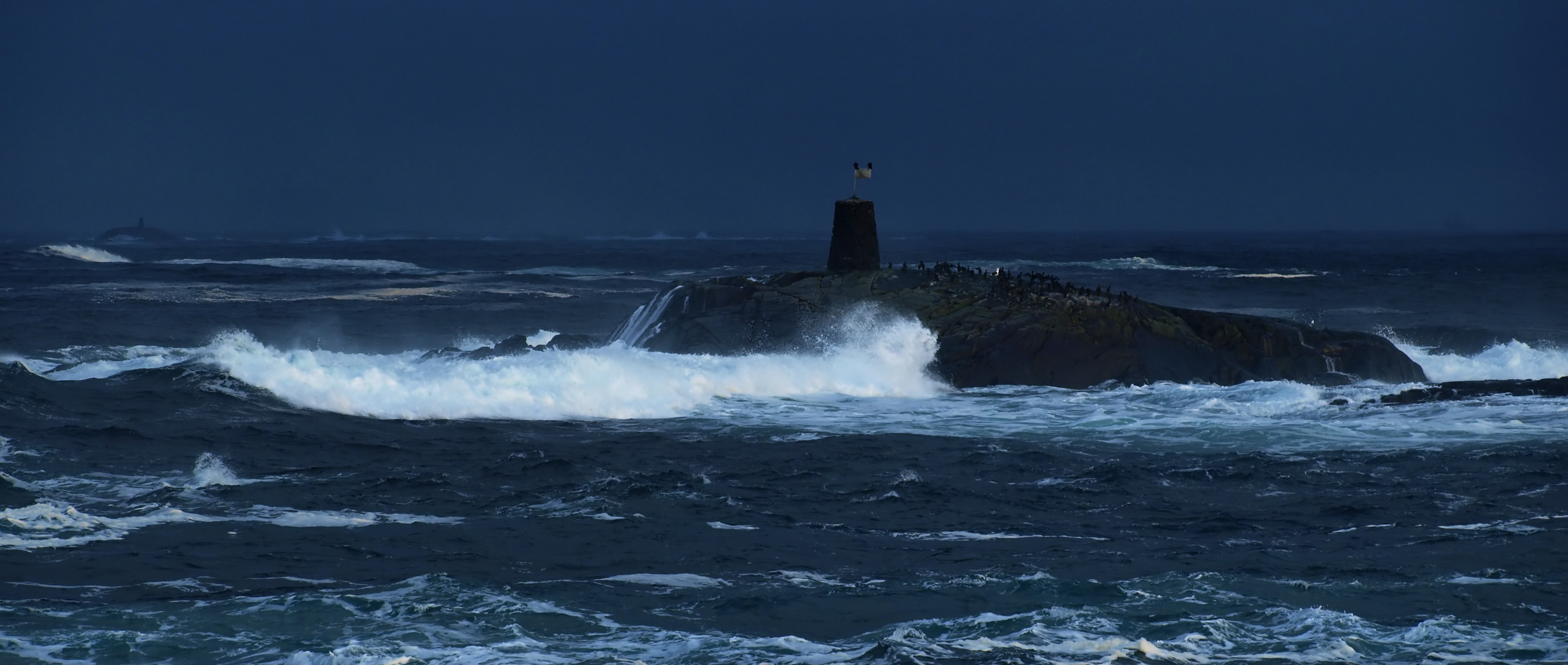
- Storm at Hustadvika
- Interactive map of the area
- Coordinates: 63.01667°N 7.1°E
- Location: Møre og Romsdal, Norway

Hustadvika is a shipping channel along a 10-nautical-mile (19 km; 12 mi) long section of coastline in Hustadvika Municipality in Møre og Romsdal county, Norway. It is the main shipping route between the towns of Molde and Kristiansund which goes around the Romsdal Peninsula.

== Shipping route ==
This is considered one of the most dangerous parts of the Norwegian coast, and many ships have been wrecked along it. Unlike most of the Norwegian coast, there are no larger islands sheltering the shipping route from the waves. The area is shallow and has many little islands and reefs, so ships have to go further out in the open ocean. The area includes the waters off of village of Bud and the Bjørnsund islands in the southwest and off the village of Hustad and Kvitholmen in the northeast.
