= Europipe =

Europipe could be:

- Europipe I - a natural gas pipeline between the Draupner E riser platform in the North Sea and the Dornum terminal in Germany
- Europipe II - a natural gas pipeline between the Kårstø processing plant in Norway and the Dornum terminal in Germany
- EUROPIPE - a German manufacturer of steel pipes
