= Kollsnes =

Natural gas processing plant in Vestland, Norway

Coordinates: 60.5486°N 4.8371°E

Kollsnes is a natural gas processing plant operated by Gassco on the southern part of the island of Oøy in Øygarden Municipality in Vestland county, Norway. Equinor is the Technical Service Provider on behalf of Gassco.

The Kollsnes plant processes the natural gas from the Troll, Kvitebjørn, and Visund gas fields. Kollsnes has a capacity of 143,000,000 cubic metres (3.8×10^{10} US gal) of natural gas per day.

== Operation ==
At Kollsnes, the Natural gas liquids (NGL) are separated out of the gas. The dry gas is compressed and then shoved by large compressors out in the pipe systems that transport it to the customers. In 1999, it was decided that the gas from Kvitebjørn was to be landed at Kollsnes. The consistency of the gas from the field made it well suited to be reprocessed to upgraded products. The new plant that was built cost 3 billion kr, with operations starting on 1 October 2004. Starting in October 2005, the gas from Visund is also landed at Kollsnes. With a capacity of 25,000,000 cubic metres (6.6×10^{9} US gal) gas per day and large flexibility, the new NGL plant can process gas from new fields that would be built.

Though the Vestprosess gas pipeline, the plant at Kollsnes is linked to the plants at Mongstad, where the NGL from Kollsnes is fractioned into propane, butane, and naphtha. The gas from Kollsnes is transported through the four pipe systems Statpipe, Zeepipe, Europipe I, and Franpipe to continental Europe and supplies Austria, Belgium, France, Germany, the Netherlands, Spain, and the Czech Republic with gas. The pipes are owned by Gassled, operated by Gassco while the technical responsibility is handled by Equinor.

== Power consumption ==
In 2009, the electric power consumption of the plant was 2,000 gigawatt-hours (7,200 TJ) per year. This had increased from 1,000 gigawatt-hours (3,600 TJ) per year in 1996.
