= Norpipe =

Undersea oil and natural gas pipelines system in the North Sea

Norpipe oil pipeline

Location
- Country: Norway, United Kingdom
- Direction: east–west
- Start: Ekofisk oil field
- Passes through: North Sea
- To: Teesside

General information
- Type: oil
- Partners: ConocoPhillips, Total S.A., Equinor, Eni, SDFI
- Operator: ConocoPhillips
- Commissioned: 1975

Technical information
- Length: 354 km (220 mi)
- Diameter: 34 in (864 mm)

Norpipe natural gas pipeline

Location
- Country: Norway, Germany
- Direction: north–south
- Start: Ekofisk oil field
- Passes through: North Sea
- To: Emden

General information
- Type: natural gas
- Owner: Gassled
- Partners: Equinor, Petoro, ConocoPhillips, Eni, ExxonMobil, Norsea Gas, Royal Dutch Shell, Total, DONG Energy
- Operator: Gassco
- Technical service provider: ConocoPhillips
- Commissioned: 1977

Technical information
- Length: 440 km (270 mi)
- Maximum discharge: 16 billion cubic meters per year
- Diameter: 36 in (914 mm)

Norpipe is a subsea oil and natural gas pipelines system in the North Sea. It supplies oil from the Norwegian Ekofisk and associated fields in the North Sea to the United Kingdom and natural gas to Germany.

== Oil pipeline ==
The Norpipe oil pipeline starts at the Ekofisk 2/4-J facility. In addition to Ekofisk (Cod, Ekofisk, West Ekofisk, Tor, Albuskjell, Eldfisk, Edda, and Embla fields) the pipeline carries oil from Valhall, Hod, Gyda, Ula, Tambar, and Oselvar fields in the Norwegian zone, and from several of the UK's oil fields, such as Fulmar and Judy (see table). A tie-in point for UK fields is located about 50 kilometres (31 mi) from Ekofisk. It has a landfall at Teesside Refinery in England.

The length of pipeline is 354 kilometres (220 mi) and it has diameter of 34 inches (860 mm). The pipeline is owned by Norpipe Oil AS, a consortium which includes ConocoPhillips Skandinavia AS (35.05%), TotalFinaElf Exploration Norge AS (34.93%), Statoil (18.5%), Eni Norge AS (6.52%), and SDFI (5%). It is operated by ConocoPhillips Skandinavia AS. The pipeline was commissioned in 1975. The Petroleum Safety Authority Norway has granted consent to use the pipeline until 2028. The Norpipe oil pipeline originally had two intermediate booster pump installations in the UK sector designated 37/4A and 36/22A, these were seldom used and were subsequently bypassed. The booster platforms were removed in 2009/10 as part of the greater Ekofisk decommissioning.

=== Booster pumping stations ===
The specification of the booster station was as follows.

Norpipe booster stations
Designation	Norpipe 37/4A	Norpipe 36/22A
Distance from Ekofisk 2/4 J	123 km	235 km
Distance from Teesside	231 km	119 km
Water depth	85 m	81 m
Fabricated	McDermott, Ardersier	UIE Cherbourg and St Wandrille
Total weight		9,750 tonnes
Installed	1974	1974
Operational	14 October 1975	1975
Drive	3 × GE (MS-3002J) 2-Stage axial gas turbines 11,800 / 14,400 hp	3 × GE (MS-3002J) 2-Stage axial gas turbines 11,800 / 14,400 hp
Fuel	Diesel or crude oil	Diesel or crude oil
Pump	3 × Bingham 1-stage centrifugal pumps	3 × Bingham 1-stage centrifugal pumps
Generators	3 × Bergen 640kVA diesel sets	3 × Bergen 640kVA diesel sets
Pigging equipment	Yes	Yes
Accommodation	2 storey, 24 beds 2 × double, 5 × four bed cabins	3 storey, 31 beds 1 × single, 9 × double, 3 × four bed
Crew	10	
Firewater pumps	Yes	Yes
Helideck	Super Puma	Super Puma
Utilities	Telemetry, lube oil, chemicals, instrument and plant air, steam, potable water, cranes and lifting equipment	2 × B-E MK 60 Cranes
Shutdown	November 1981	1977
Occupation ceased	1983	1983
Pipeline bypass	1994	1994
Topsides removed	2009	2009
Jacket removed	2010	2010

=== UK fields and Norpipe ===
The following fields and installations export oil into the Norpipe pipeline.

Fields exporting to Norpipe
Field	Installation	Production to	Length	Diameter, inches	Year commissioned
Ekofisk	Platform 2/4 J	Teesside terminal	354 km	34	1975
Judy	Platform	Norpipe UK Tee via Northern Wye and Southern Wye		24	1997
Joanne	Subsea	Judy	5.5 km	2 x 12-inch	2002
Jasmine	Platform	Judy	6 miles	16	2013
Jade	Platform	Judy	17.3 km	16	2002
Stella	Semi-submersible FPF-1	Southern Wye / Tanker	44 km	10	2016
Harrier	Subsea	Stella FPF-1	7 km		2018
Fulmar	Platform	Southern Wye	15.5 km	24	1997 Fulmar had formerly used offshore tanker loading
Auk	Platform	Fulmar	12 km	8	1975
Auk North	Subsea	Fulmar	10.7 km	8	2011
Gannet	Platform	Fulmar	107 km	16	1992
Clyde	Platform	Fulmar	11 km	16	1986
Orion	Subsea	Clyde	16.3 km	10	1999
Flyndre	Subsea	Clyde	20 km	8	2017

=== Throughput ===
Annual oil production from 1998 (in 1000 tonnes)

The total oil throughput of the terminal up to the end of 2021 was 104.585 million tonnes.

== Natural gas pipeline ==
The 440-kilometre (270 mi) long Norpipe natural gas pipeline runs from Ekofisk to a receiving terminal at Emden in Germany. The diameter of pipeline is 36 inches (910 mm) and it has capacity of 16 billion cubic metres (570 billion cubic feet) of natural gas per year. The natural gas pipeline was commissioned in 1977 and will be in use until 2028. The start-up investment was 26.4 billion Norwegian krone. The pipeline is owned by Gassled and operated by Gassco. The technical service provider is ConocoPhillips.

On 30 September 1995, a German cargo ship Reint collided with the Norpipe H7-platform in the German continental shelf. Only minimal damages to the platform, and no injuries to people were caused. The H7 platform has been off-the-service since 1999, and in 2007 a bypass pipe laid around the platform.

== See also ==
- Europipe I
- Europipe II
- Franpipe
- MIDAL
