= Netra =

Natural gas pipeline system in Germany

Netra pipeline

Location
- Country: Germany
- Direction: west–east
- Start: Emden, Dornum
- Passes through: Etzel, Wardenburg, Börnicke,
- To: Steinitz

General information
- Type: natural gas
- Partners: Open Grid Europe
- Operator: Open Grid Europe
- Commissioned: 1995

Technical information
- Length: 408 km (254 mi)
- Maximum discharge: 21.4 billion cubic meters per year

Netra (Norddeutsche Erdgas Transversale) is a 408 kilometres (254 mi) long natural gas pipeline system in Germany, which runs from the Dornum natural gas receiving facility at the coast of North Sea to Salzwedel in eastern Germany, where it is connected with the JAGAL pipeline. The pipeline is extended to Berlin through the Salzwedel–Berlin connection.

Construction of the Netra pipeline was agreed in 1994 and the pipeline was commissioned in 1995. Originally it run from the Etzel gas storage facility to Salzwedel. In 1999, after commissioning the Europipe II pipeline, the NETRA pipeline system is extended from Etzel to Dornum. The compressor station near Wardenburg was built in 2003.

The pipeline was owned and operated by NETRA GmbH Norddeutsche Erdgas Transversale & Co KG, a joint venture of E.ON Ruhrgas (41.7%), Gasunie Deutschland (29.6%) and Statoil (28.7%). Now it is owned and operated by Open Grid Europe.

== See also ==
- Europipe I
- Europipe II
