= Øystein Løseth =

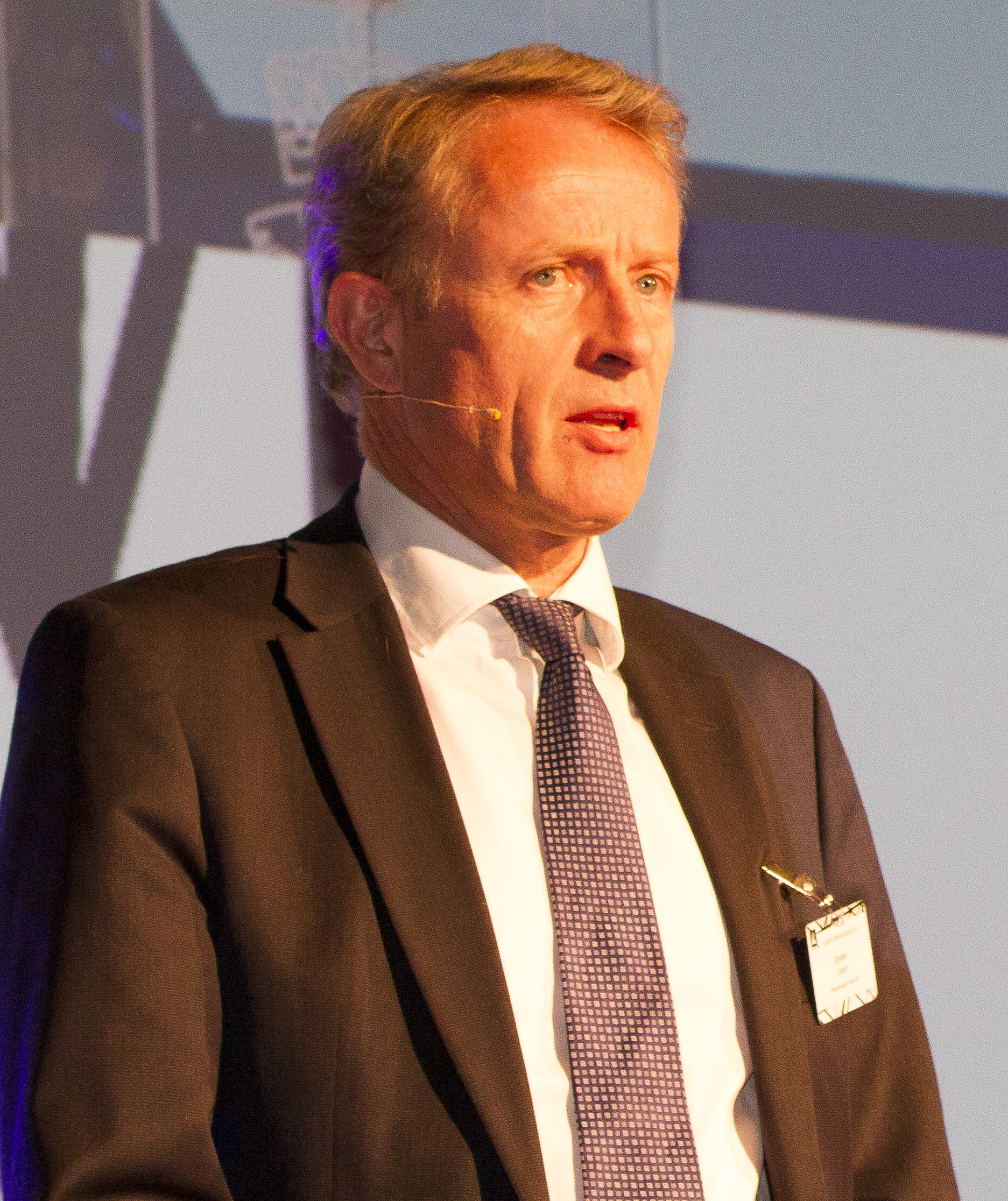
- Born: August 17, 1958 (age 67); Ringebu
- Known for: Chairman of Statoil

Øystein Løseth (born 17 August 1958) is a Norwegian business executive serving as the chairman of the board of Norwegian oil company Statoil and as chairman of the board of Eidsiva Energi.

== Early life ==
He was born in Ringebu and raised in Vingnes. At age 15, the family moved to Rindal, his father's hometown.

== Career ==
Løseth graduated in civil engineering from the Norwegian University of Science and Technology and later in business administration. He started his career at Statoil, where he worked until 1994. He would then work at Naturkraft, Norsk Hydro and Statkraft.

He served as executive vice president of Statkraft, and since 2008 as CEO of Nuon. After Vattenfall finished its acquisition of Nuon in 2008, he served as Vattenfall's CEO from 2010 to 2014. Løseth's leadership at Vattenfall was criticized, as the company had to write off 100 billion SEK on Nuon. In April 2018, Løseth was appointed CEO of Fugro, stepping down again the end of 2018.

== Personal life ==
Løseth is married and has three daughters. His hobbies include football (soccer) and skiing.
