= Zeepipe =

Natural Gas Transport System

Zeepipe pipeline system
- Location of Zeepipe pipeline system

Location
- Country: Norway, Belgium
- Start: Kollsnes
- Passes through: Sleipner field, Draupner field
- To: Zeebrugge

General information
- Type: natural gas
- Owner: Gassled
- Operator: Gassco
- Technical service provider: Statoil
- Contractors: Halliburton
- Commissioned: 1993

Technical information
- Length: 1,416 km (880 mi)
- Maximum discharge: 15 billion m^{3}/y (Zeepipe I); 26.3 billion m^{3}/y (Zeepipe IIA); 25.9 billion m^{3}/y (Zeepipe IIB)
- Diameter: 40 in (1,016 mm)

The Zeepipe is a natural gas transportation system to transport North Sea natural gas to the receiving terminal at Zeebrugge in Belgium.

The total costs of Zeepipe system is around 24.2 billion NOK. It is owned by Gassled partners and operated by Gassco. The technical service provider is Statoil. The Zeebrugge receiving terminal is owned by Fluxys (51%) and Gassled partners (49%).

== Zeepipe I ==
The Zeepipe I pipeline was commissioned on 1 October 1993. The 814-kilometre-long (506 mi) pipeline runs from Sleipner field to Zeebrugge. The pipeline has a diameter of 40 inches (1,000 mm) and its capacity is 15 billion cubic meters of natural gas per year. At the time of construction, it was the longest and largest offshore pipeline in the world. It was more than twice as long as the next largest single-section offshore pipeline in the world.

Originally, there was a plan to build an intermediate service platform to the pipeline to tie in future compression facilities and to enable the pipeline to be pigged in two sections. However, due to technological development it is possible to serve the pipeline as one pigging segment and the need for the service platform was eliminated.

The second section of Zeepipe I consists of a 30-inch (760 mm) pipeline from Draupner S to Sleipner. It links Zeepipe with Statpipe.

The contract for pre-commissioning and commissioning of Zeepipe 1 was awarded to Halliburton Oilfield Services Inc. Halliburton awarded engineering and procurement sub-contracts to Brown and Root Engineering Ltd. The pipeline was laid by Semac 1 and Castoro Sei pipe-laying ships.

== Zeepipe IIA ==
Zeepipe II A, operational since 1996, is 303 kilometres (188 mi) long 40-inch (1,000 mm) pipeline from Kollsnes gas processing plant in Norway to Sleipner Riser. The capacity of Zeepipe II A is 26.3 billion cubic meters per year.

== Zeepipe IIB ==
Zeepipe II B, operational since 1 October 1997, runs from Kollsnes to Draupner E. The length of 40-inch (1,000 mm) Zeepipe II B is 299 kilometres (186 mi) and the capacity is about 25.9 billion cubic meters per year.
