= Naturkraft =

Norwegian power company

Naturkraft AS
- Company type: Private
- Industry: Power
- Founded: 1994
- Founder: Statkraft; Statoil; Norsk Hydro
- Headquarters: Tysvær Municipality, Norway
- Area served: Norway
- Key people: Arne Liverud (CEO); Bjørn Blaker (Chairman)
- Products: Electricity
- Revenue: NOK 0 million (2006)
- Operating income: NOK 130 million (2006)
- Net income: NOK 187 million (2006)
- Owner: Statkraft (50%); Equinor (50%)
- Website: www.naturkraft.no

Naturkraft is a Norwegian power company that operates one natural gas powered thermal power station located at Kårstø in Tysvær Municipality. It also holds a permit to build a second one at Kollsnes. The company is owned by Statoil and Statkraft, with 50% each.

== History ==
The company was founded in 1994 by Statkraft, Statoil and Norsk Hydro with 1/3 ownership each, though Statoil in 2004 sold its ownership to Statkraft and Norsk Hydro. In 1996, Naturkraft received permission from the Norwegian Water Resources and Energy Directorate to build both of the plants, at Kårstø and Kollsnes. In 1997, the permits were confirmed by the Norwegian Ministry of Petroleum and Energy. In 1999, the permit for emissions was granted by the Norwegian Pollution Control Authority, and confirmed by the Norwegian Ministry of the Environment in 2001.

In September 2005 Arne Liverud took up the position as CEO at Naturkraft AS.

== Controversy ==
The construction of the two power stations has provoked a huge controversy in Norway, due to the large amounts of carbon dioxide that will be emitted. The Kårstø plant will emit 1.2 million tonnes of carbon dioxide, or about 2.5% of the total emissions of Norway. Prior to the opening of the Kårstø power station on November 2, 2007 Norway's sole domestic production of grid electricity was provided through renewable energy.
