= Port of Zeebrugge =

Seaport near Bruges, Belgium

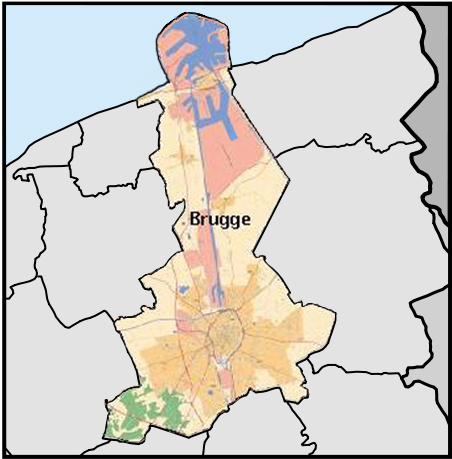
- Bruges and the port area of Bruges-Zeebrugge (pink)
- Interactive map of Port of Zeebrugge
- Location in Belgium

Location
- Country: Belgium
- Location: Bruges, Flanders
- Coordinates: 51°17′35″N 3°12′35″E
- UN/LOCODE: BEZEE

Statistics
- Annual cargo tonnage: over 50 million tonnes (2012)
- Website www.zeebruggeport.be

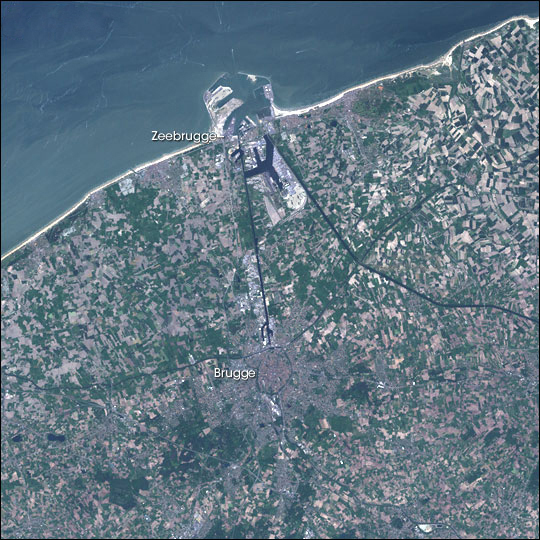
Satellite image of Bruges and the Port

The Port of Zeebrugge (also referred to as the Port of Bruges or Bruges Seaport) is a large container, bulk cargo, new vehicles and passenger ferry terminal port on the North Sea. The port is located in the municipality of Bruges, West Flanders in the Flemish Region of Belgium, handling over 50 million tonnes of cargo annually.

The port of Zeebrugge is managed by the port authority MBZ (Maatschappij van de Brugse Zeehaven - translated: 'Company of the Bruges Seaport'), an autonomous company regulated by public law, the city of Bruges being the main shareholder.

== History ==
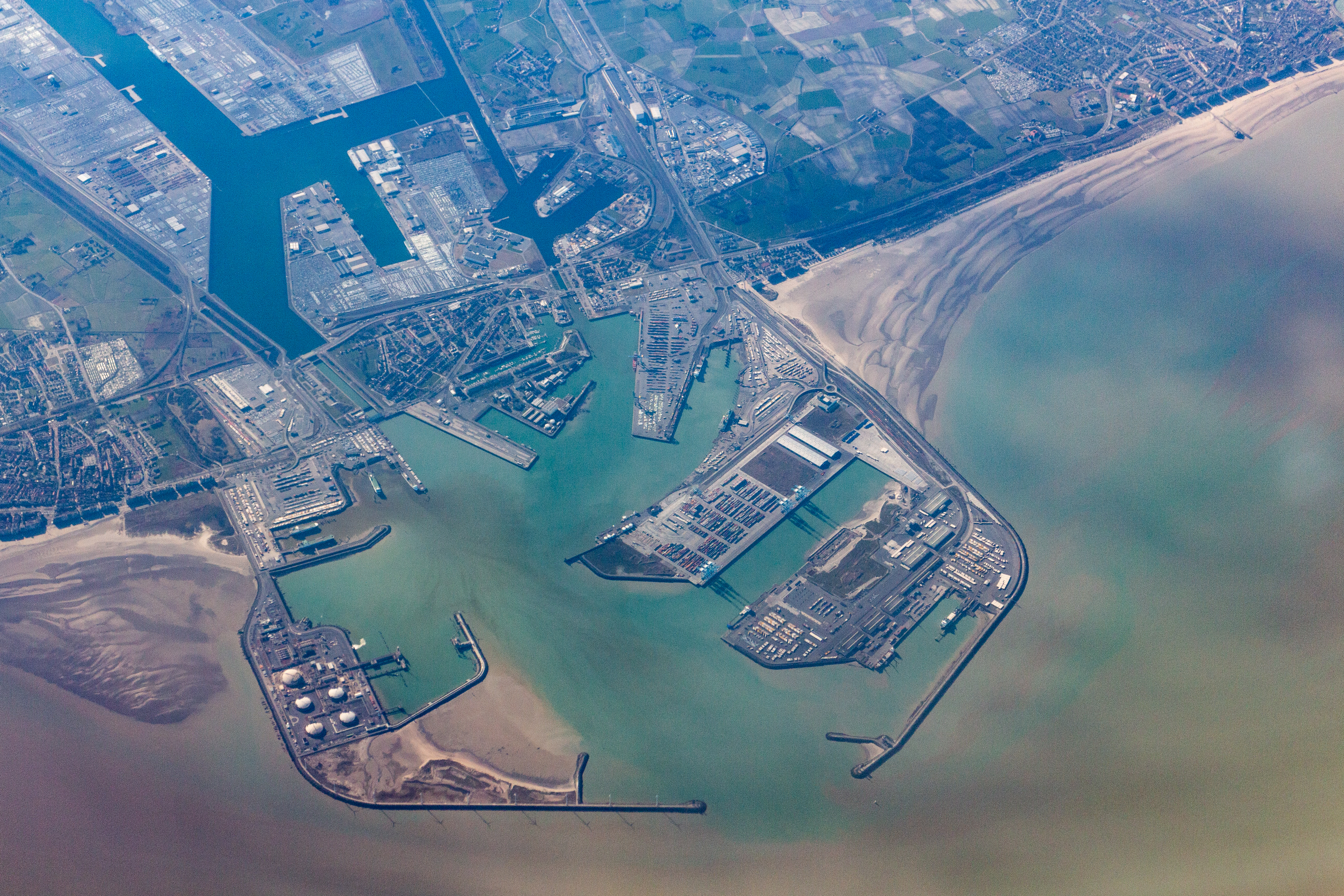
Outer port of Zeebrugge

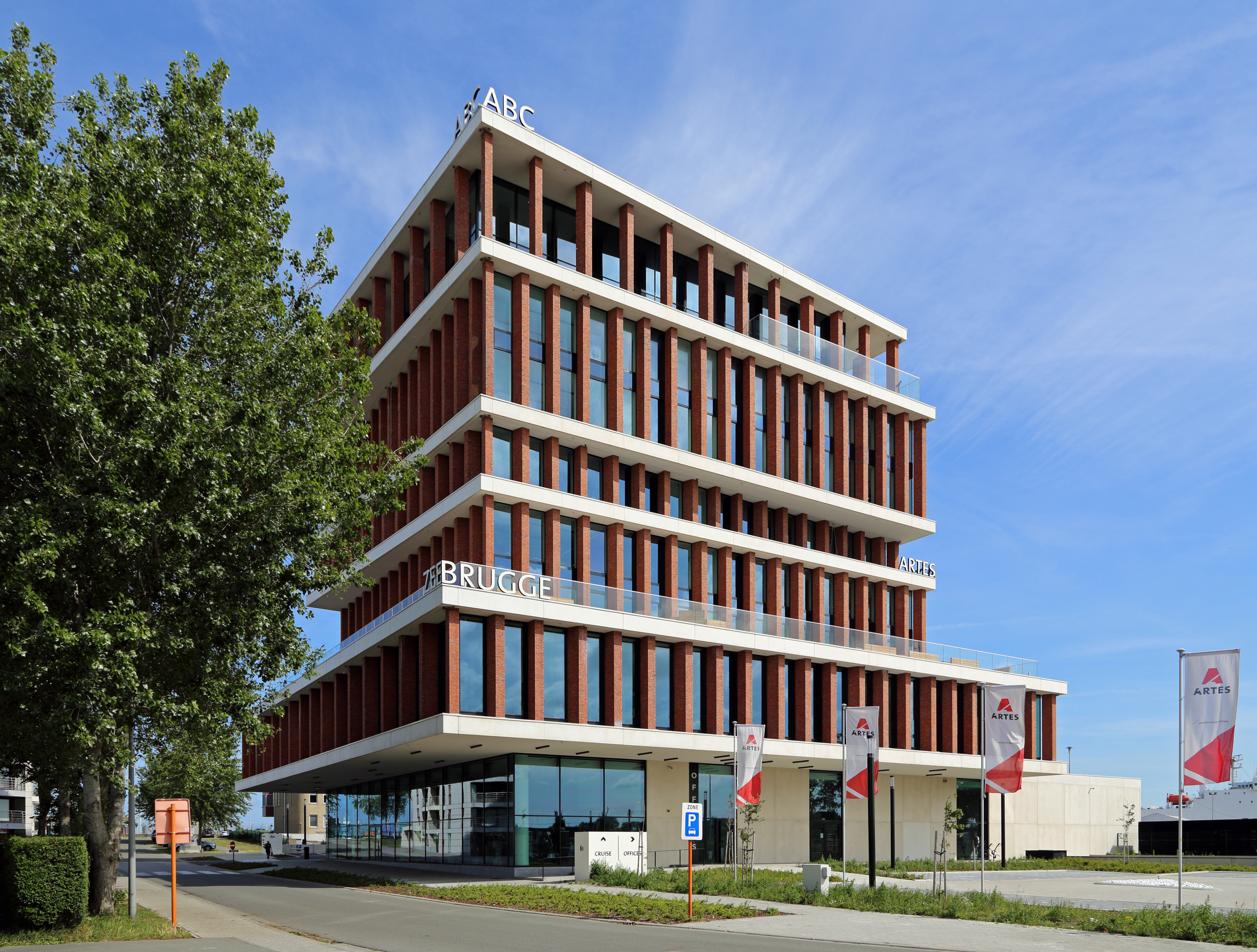
The cruise terminal of Zeebrugge

Zeebrugge is a multifaceted port that handles a wide range of trades: unit loads (trailers and containers), new cars, conventional general cargo, 'high & heavy' cargoes, dry and liquid bulk cargoes and natural gas. From a purely transit port Zeebrugge has gradually evolved into a centre for European distribution.

The port has become a major European port since major development works were carried in the 1972 to 1985 period. Since then total tonnage has doubled. As of 2008, Bruges-Zeebrugge is one of the fastest growing ports between Le Havre and Hamburg. It is Europe's leading RoRo port, handling 12.5 million mt in 2010, and the world's largest port for imports and exports of new vehicles, with over 1.6 million units handled in 2010 (24.5% less than in 2008 due to the economical crises). It is also Europe's largest terminal for liquefied natural gas (LNG), receiving natural gas from the Troll gas field via the 814-kilometre (506 mi; 440 nmi) long Zeepipe under the North Sea. LNG is also delivered in specialized gas tankers from various origins, like Africa, Australia or the Middle East. Zeebrugge counts as one of the most important ports in Europe for containerized cargo as well, handling over 2.5 million TEUs in 2010.

The port employs directly over 11,000 people and handles over 10,000 ship moorings annually. Together with the indirect employees, the port creates over 28,000 jobs.

The most important functions of the port are:

- Intense RoRo traffic between the Continent, Great Britain, Scandinavia and Southern Europe;
- European hub port for the automotive industry;
- Container port with a good nautical accessibility for + 19,000 TEU ships;
- Import of Liquefied Natural Gas and energy products;
- Handling, storage and distribution of perishables and other agricultural products;
- Handling of conventional general cargo and 'high & heavy' cargoes;
- Passenger transport;
- Organisation of the European distribution via an intricate network of hinterland connections.

== Advantages of the port ==
The port complex of Bruges-Zeebrugge offers several main assets, which will allow volumes to develop even further in the years to come, namely,

- The favourable geographical position:
  - On the coast of the North Sea, the busiest sea in the world;
  - Central in relation to other North Sea ports;
  - Within a short distance of Great Britain;
  - Close to many major, densely populated and industrialised cities;
- Good nautical accessibility with a deep water draught in the approaches and at the berths;
- Good road and rail connections to all countries of Continental Europe;
- Several daily liner services to Great Britain and to other ports in northern and southern Europe, Zeebrugge being the cross-roads for traffic in all directions;
- A network of intercontinental and intra-European container services;
- Modern port equipment, recently established, which meets all the expectations of modern shipping and handling techniques;
- A large potential of skilled labour achieving high productivity.

== Ferry routes ==
The following ferry operators operate regular scheduled, international routes to and from Zeebrugge.

Operator	Destinations	Notes
Cobelfret	Dublin, Esbjerg, Gothenburg, Hirtshals, Killingholme, Purfleet, Santander	
DFDS Seaways	Rosyth	No longer operating since 2018
Finnlines	Helsinki, Tilbury	
P&O Ferries	Middlesbrough, Teesport, Tilbury	

== Terminals ==
As of July 2015:

Terminal	Type	Website
=== Outer port ===
Zeebrugge International Port (ZIP)	paper and multi-purpose terminal	
Zeebrugge International Port (ZIP)	deepsea container terminal	
Container Handling Zeebrugge (CHZ)	deepsea container terminal	
Verbrugge Terminals Zeebrugge	breakbulk terminal	
APM Terminals Zeebrugge	deepsea container terminal	
P&O Ferries	roro terminal	
DFDS Seaways	roro terminal	
Fluxys - LNG Terminal	terminal for liquefied natural gas	
C.RO Terminal; Brittaniadok, Hermeskaai, Minervaplein	roro terminal	
C.RO Terminal; Zweedse Kaai	roro terminal	
Euroservices NV	terminal for the purging of gas-carriers	
=== Inner port Zeebrugge ===
ICO Terminals; Northern Inlet dock	roro terminal for new cars and breakbulk	
ICO Terminals; Bastenakenkade	roro terminal for new cars	
Sea-Invest, Belgian New Fruit Wharf	terminal for general cargo and fruit	
Sea-Invest, Flanders Cold Center - Tropicana	terminal for general cargo packing installation for fruit juices	
Tate & Lyle Molasses	terminal for molasses	
Vlaamse Visveiling	fish auction	
Zeebrugge Food Logistics	deepfreeze warehouse	
Hanson Europe	sand and gravel terminal	
Borlix	terminal for agricultural products	
Decloedt Dredging	maintenance and storage facility	
Wallenius Wilhelmsen Logistics	roro terminal for new cars	
C.RO Terminal Canadakaai	roro terminal for new cars	
Fluxys - peak shaving installation	terminal for storage of liquefied natural gas	
Gassco	terminal for the gas pipeline "Zeepipe" from Norway	
Toyota	dedicated autoterminal	
CdMZ	roro terminal for new cars	
Seabridge/Efico	terminal for storage and distribution of green coffee	
Bridgestone Logistics	terminal for storage of tyres	
Brit European Transport	international transport, storage and distribution of floor coverings	
Progeco	container depot at Jozef Verschaeveweg	
==== Transportzone Zeebrugge ====
Interconnector	terminal for gas pipeline "Interconnector" from Bacton (UK)	
European Container Services ECS	intermodal transport and logistics	
2XL	intermodal transport and logistics	
Middlegate Europe	intermodal transport and logistics	
Huktra	intermodal transport of tank containers	
North Sea Express	international transport	
Britlink	international transport	
==== Inner port Bruges ====
Nieuwpoortse Handelsmaatschappij	sand and gravel terminal	
Alzagri	sand and gravel terminal	
Hanson	sand and gravel terminal	
Seaport Shipping & Trading	terminal for general cargo, project cargo and bulk cargo	
Minne Port Services	terminal for general cargo, project cargo and bulk cargo	
Beveco	peat terminal	
Denolf Recycling	recycling terminal	
Flanders Ship Repair / Longueville	ship repair	
Marpos	waste treatment	
Tomar Kolen	coal terminal	
ABN Transport	exceptional transport	
Solid	timber terminal	

== Gallery ==
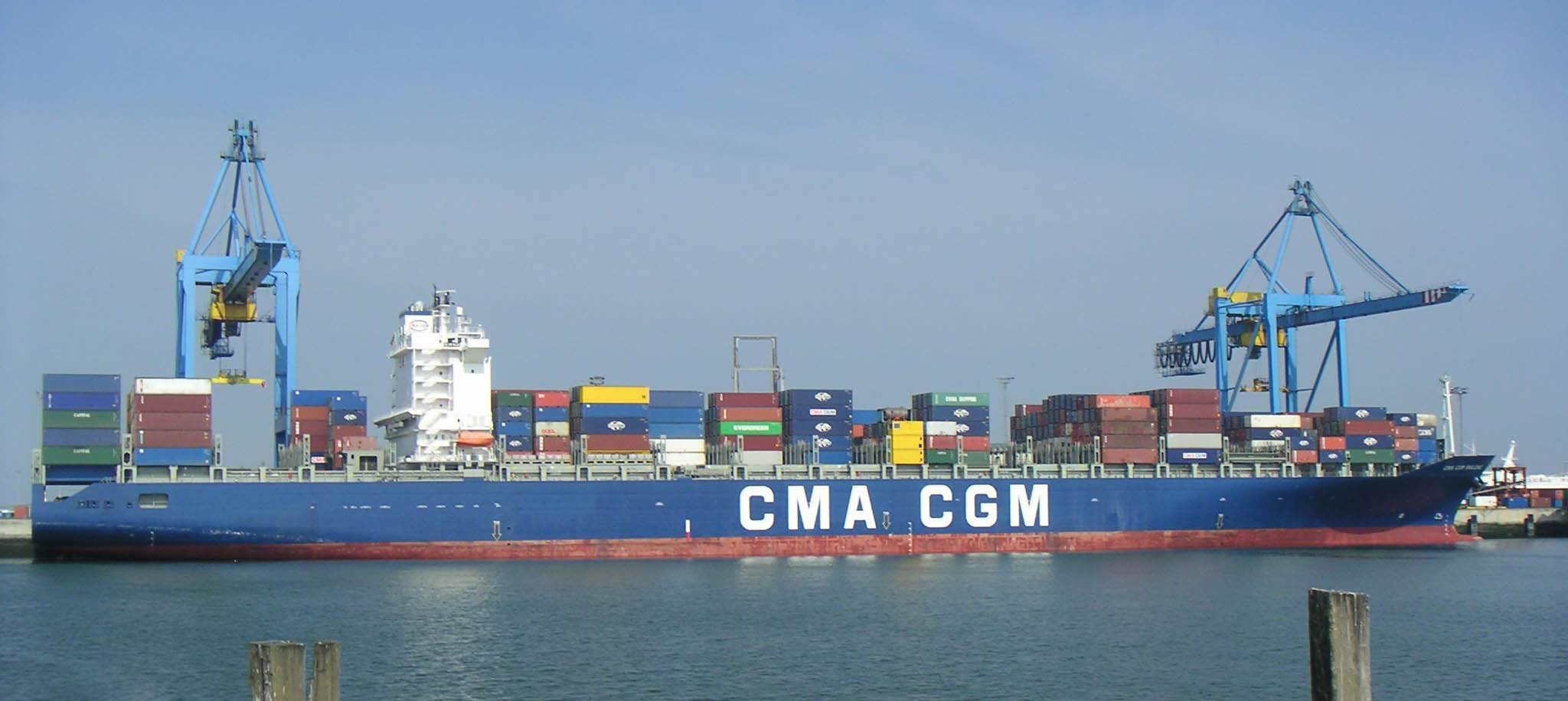
Containership CMA CGM BALZAC in PSA HNN terminal.

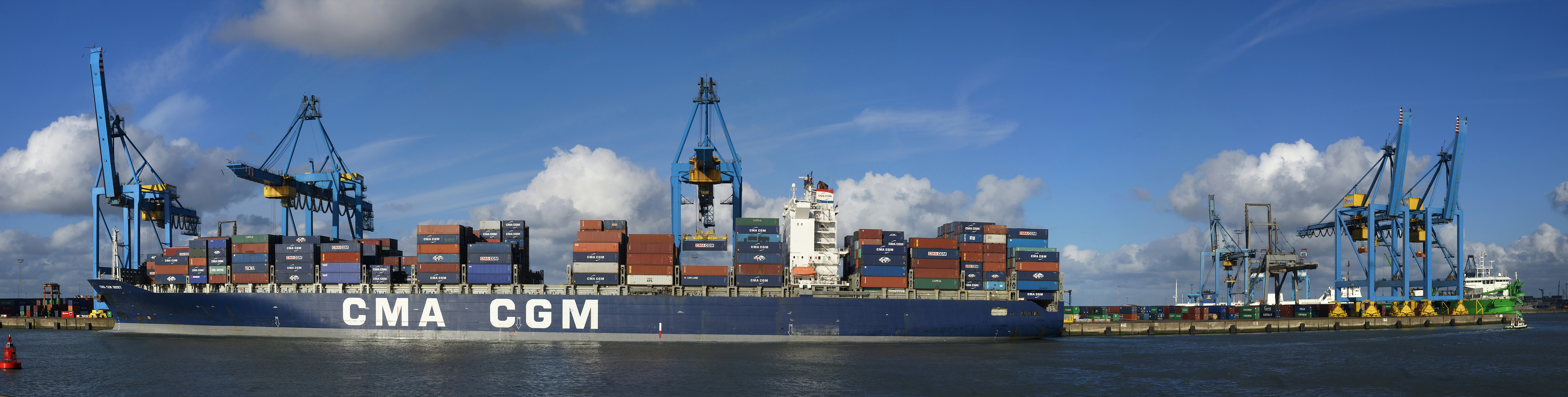
Containership CMA CGM BIZET in PSA HNN terminal.

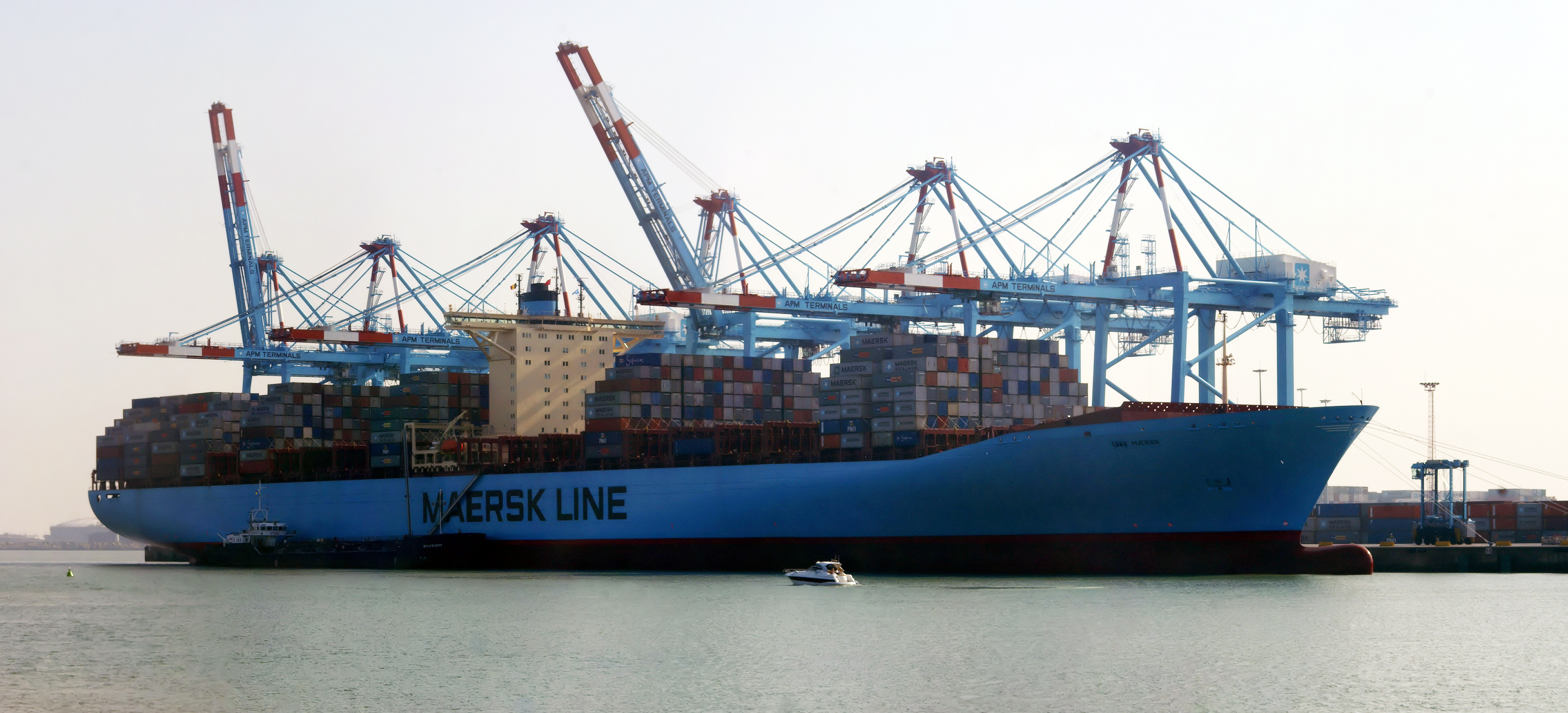
The Elly Mærsk, here at Zeebrugge port, currently one of the world's largest container vessels.

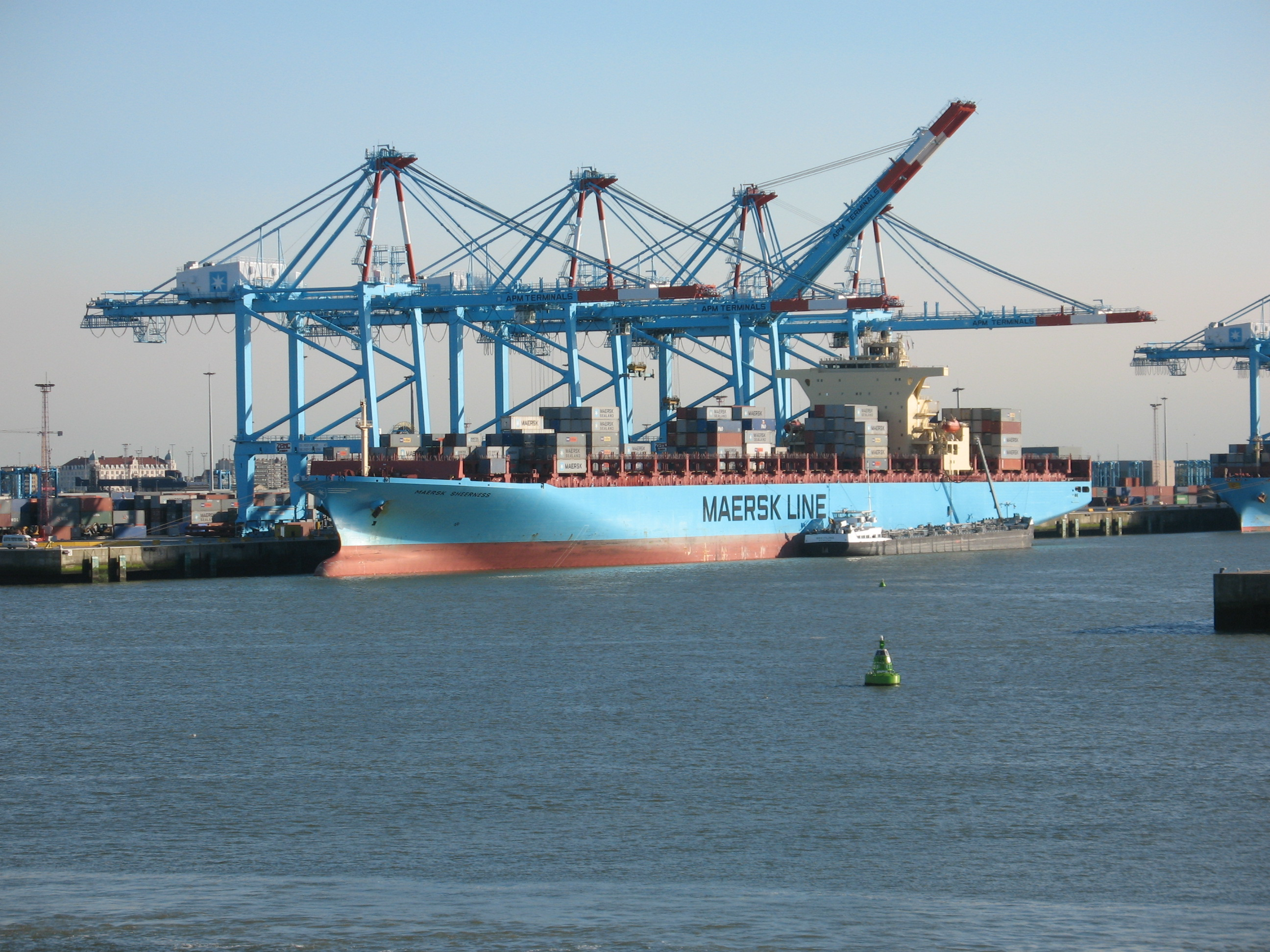
Mærsk containership.

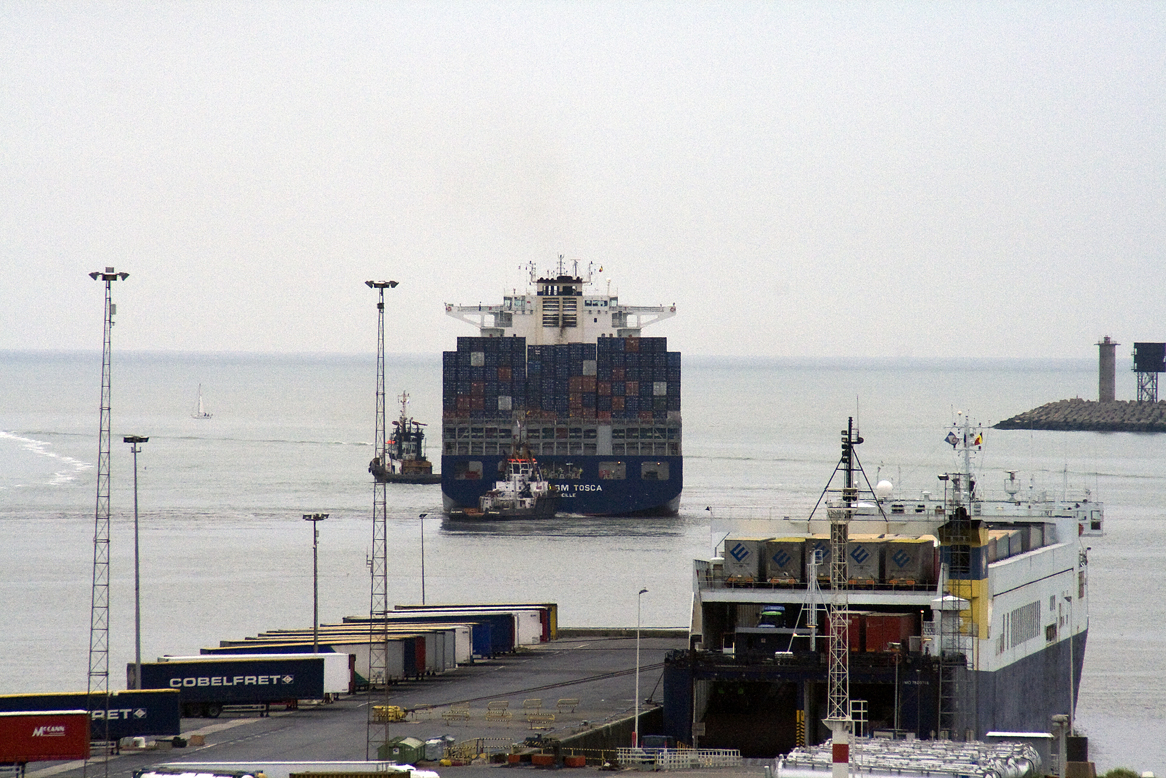
Container ship leaving the port.

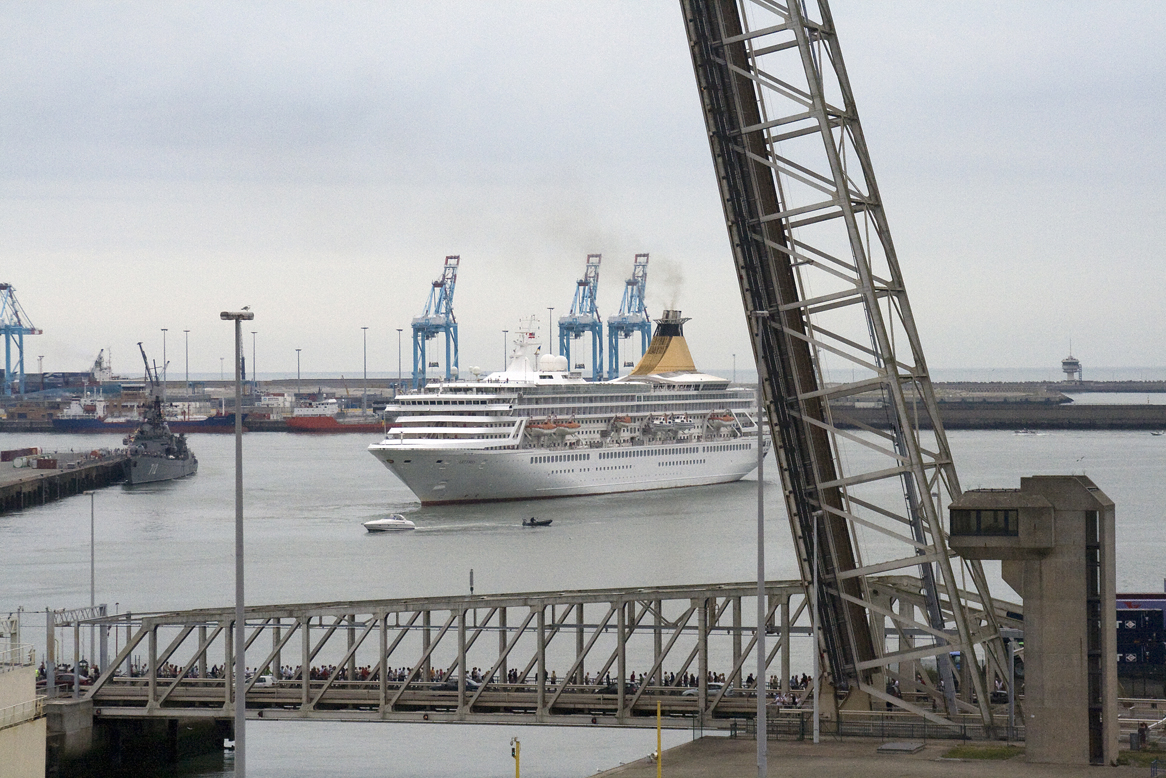
Cruise ship leaving the port.

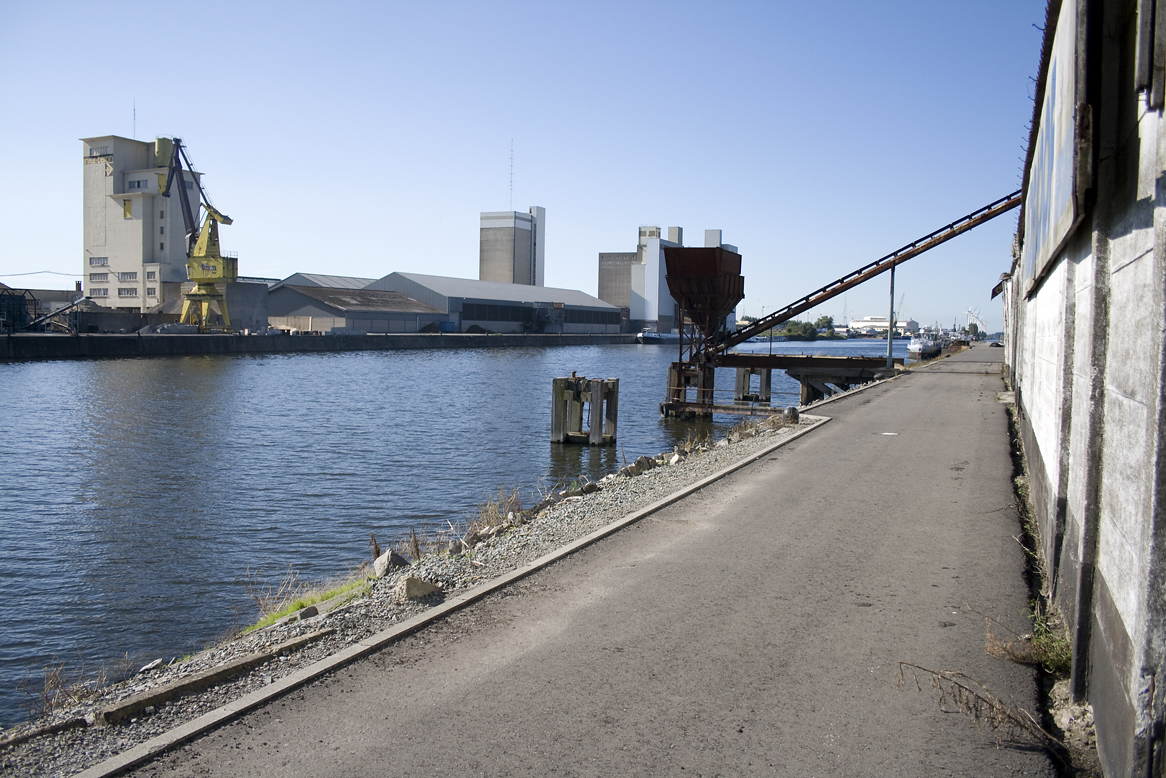
Emile Cousin dock in the inner port in Bruges.
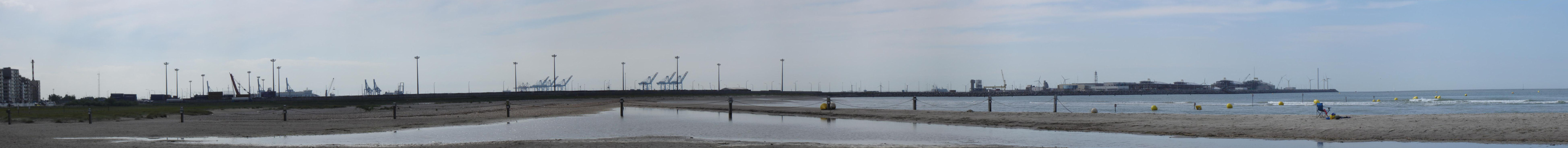
View on the eastern dam of the Port of Zeebrugge, Brugge, seen from the beach of Heist, Knokke-Heist.

== Historical events ==
- 1866 Mr August de Maere d'Aertrijcke, a Ghent Alderman describes the project of connecting his town with the sea in a public conference. He is known as the father of the Zeebrugge port.
- 1894 Belgian parliament votes the law approving the construction of Port of Heyst
- The port was inaugurated on 23 July 1907 by King Leopold II, who arrived by sea.
- On 23 April 1918, the port was the target of the Zeebrugge Raid by the Royal Navy and Royal Marines. This was an attempt to block access to and from the port by intentionally sinking ships to block the canal entrance, thus preventing its use by German ships and submarines. Eight participants in the raid were awarded the Victoria Cross.
- October 1918, the capture of Zeebrugge by the Allies.
- On 6 March 1987, the ferry Herald of Free Enterprise (owned by Townsend-Thoresen) was just outside the port when it took on water due to the bow doors remaining open, became unstable and capsized, killing 193 passengers.
- On 16 August 2014, 35 people of Afghan origin, were found in a container at Tilbury Docks that had originated from The Bruges-Zeebruge port. All were suspected to be dehydrated and 1 man died from his injuries.

== See also ==
- Zeebrugge Hub

== Bibliography ==
- A. de Maere-Limnander, (1866). Des communications directes du port de Gand à la mer. Canal de Terneuzen - Canal de Heyst: conférence donnée au Cercle Commercial et Industriel de Gand. Imprimerie et Lithographie C. Annoot-Braeckman: Gand, Belgium. 52, plates I-II pp.,
- A. de Maere-Limnander, (1877). D'une communication directe de Bruges à la mer. Imprimerie Houdmont, Frères: Bruges, Belgium. 57, plates I-IV pp
- J. Nyssens-Hart, Le Port de vitesse de Heyst. (Actuellement port de Zeebrugge) avec cartes (circa 1895).
- J. Nyssens-Hart et J. Zone, Le port de vitesse de Heyst. 120 pp. avec planches couleurs. (circa 1895)
- J. Nyssens-Hart The Outer Port and the Inner Port of Bruges. Brussels, A. Lesigne, 1898, 43 pp. Online at Flandrica.be
- U. Naert, (1977). Baron August de Maere d'Aertrycke: vader van Brugge-Zeehaven. chez l'Auteur à Eernegem, Belgique. 148 pp
- E. Bilé; E. Trips, (1970). Zeebrugge: een haven in de branding 1895–1970. Brugsch Handelsblad: Belgium. 244 pp.
- Anon. (1995). Tentoonstelling 100 jaar Zeehaven Brugge 8 juli-20 September 1995. Zeehaven Brugge: Brugge, Belgium. 184 pp.,
