= Opedal =

Opedal is a place and surname in Norway. Notable people by that name include:

- Anders Opedal (born 1964), former chief operating officer of Norwegian oil and gas company Statoil.
- Dag J. Opedal (born 1959), Norwegian businessman and former CEO of Orkla Group.
