= Draupner platform =

Gas platform in the Norwegian North Sea

Location of Draupner Platform in the North Sea

The Draupner platform is a gas platform for the extraction of natural gas in the North Sea consisting of the Draupner S and E riser platforms. (Note: Draupner S and E are located at 58°11′19.60″N 2°28′21.6″E and 58°11′19.30″N 2°28′0.00″E respectively.) It is located in the Norwegian North Sea block 16/11 160 km (99 mi) offshore from Norway. The complex consists of seven risers and two riser platforms standing in 70 m (230 ft) water depth and linked by a bridge. Draupner E is the first major oil platform using jacket-type construction supported on a bucket foundation and suction anchors. The complex is owned by Gassled and operated by Gassco. The technical service provider is Equinor.

The Draupner platform is a key hub for monitoring pressure, volume and quality of gas flows in Norway's offshore gas pipelines. Draupner S was installed in 1984 as part of the Statpipe system. It connects the Statpipe lines from Heimdal and Kårstø for onward transmission to the Ekofisk oil field. In April 1985, first gas was transferred through the platform. Draupner E was installed in 1994 as part of the Europipe I pipeline. Europipe I, Franpipe and Zeepipe II B are connected to the Draupner E, while Statpipe and Zeepipe I are connected to the Draupner S.

== 1995 rogue wave ==
The platform was built with an extensive array of instruments to monitor wave height, slope, acceleration and movement of the pillars and foundations. In 1995, a laser rangefinder monitoring instrument detected a rogue wave, which became known as the Draupner wave. This wave provided additional scientific evidence for the existence of rogue waves to a previous observation done on the Gorm Platform in the Danish sector in 1984.
