= Draupnir (disambiguation) =

Draupnir is a gold ring in Norse mythology with the ability to multiply itself.

Draupnir may also refer to:

- Draupnir (dwarf), a dwarf mentioned in Völuspá.
- Draupnir (band), a black metal band from France.
- Draupner platform, the riser platform on the North Sea
