= Europipe II =

Natural gas pipeline from Norway to Germany

Europipe II gas pipeline
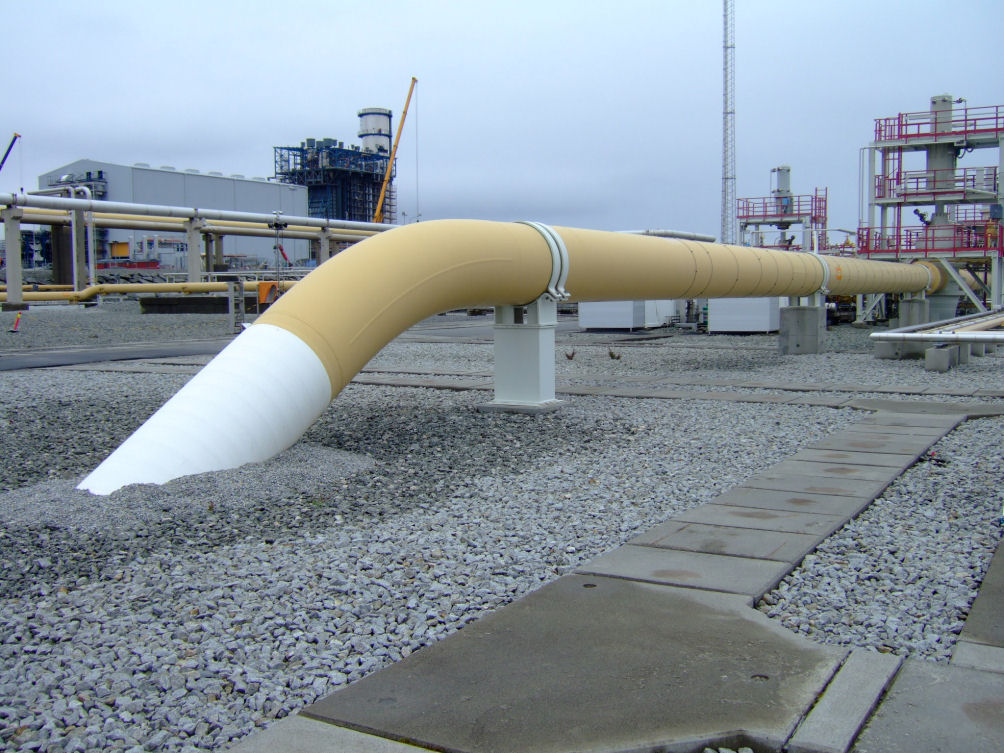
- Europipe II at Kårstø
- Location of Europipe II gas pipeline

Location
- Country: Norway, Germany
- Direction: north–south
- Start: Kårstø, Norway
- Passes through: North Sea
- To: Dornum, Germany

General information
- Type: natural gas
- Owner: Gassled
- Operator: Gassco
- Technical service provider: Statoil
- Commissioned: 1999

Technical information
- Length: 658 km (409 mi)
- Maximum discharge: 24 billion m^{3}/a (850 billion cu ft/a)
- Diameter: 42 in (1,067 mm)

Europipe II is a natural gas pipeline from the Kårstø processing plant north of Stavanger, Norway, to a receiving terminal at Dornum in Germany. It came on stream on 1 October 1999.

== Route ==
Europipe II is a natural gas pipeline from the Kårstø plant north of Stavanger, Norway and runs about 13 kilometres (8.1 mi) onshore from Kårstø to Vestre Bokn. From there, the 642-kilometre (399 mi) offshore pipeline runs through Norwegian, Danish and German sectors of the North Sea. The German onshore section is 15 kilometres (9.3 mi) long. At Dornum the gas is supplied into the Netra (Norddeutsche Erdgas Transversale) gas pipeline, which runs to Salzwedel in eastern Germany.

== Technical description ==
The diameter of pipeline is 1,100 millimetres (42 in) and the capacity is 24 billion cubic metres (850 billion cubic feet) of natural gas per year. Most of the gas is supplied from Equinor's Åsgard, Sleipner East/West, Gullfaks and Statfjord fields.

The Europipe II pipeline was laid by Semac I, Castoro Sei and Solitaire pipe-laying ships. Europipe II was commissioned in 1999 and cost 9.6 billion NOK. The pipeline is operated by Gassco, the technical service provider is Equinor. It was built with an option to branch out to a separate pipeline to Denmark. A pipeline end manifold was installed in April 2022 for the Baltic Pipe to Poland.

== See also ==
- Europipe I
- MIDAL
