= Kårstø Power Station =

Power station in Rogaland, Norway

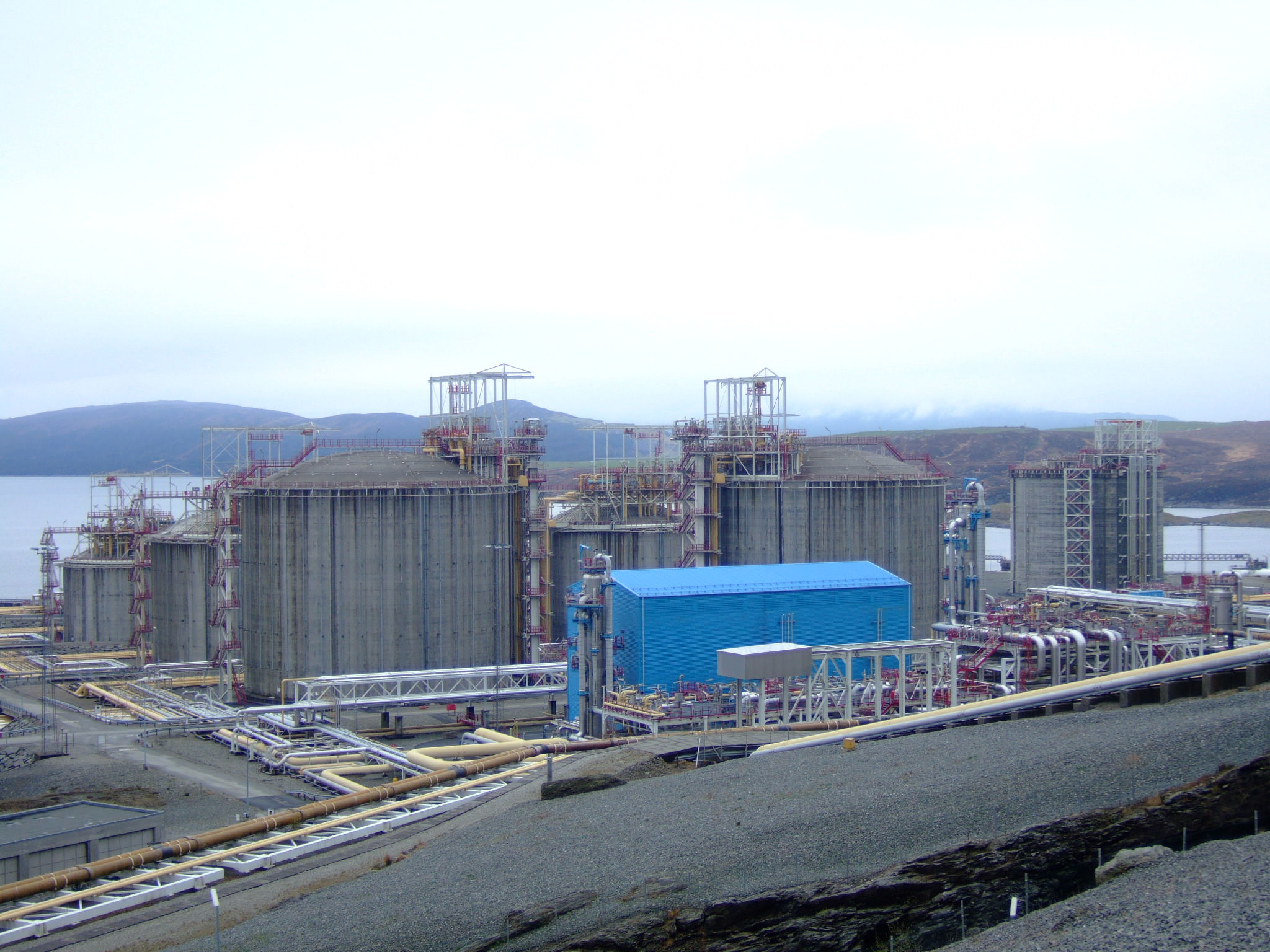
- Official name: Kårstø gasskraftverk
- Country: Norway
- Location: Kårstø, Norway
- Coordinates: 59°16′32″N 05°30′40″E
- Status: Decommissioned
- Commission date: 2 November 2007
- Decommission date: 2016
- Owner: Naturkraft
- Operator: Naturkraft

Thermal power station
- Primary fuel: Natural gas

Power generation
- Units operational: 1
- Nameplate capacity: 420 megawatts (560,000 hp)
- Annual net output: 3.5 terawatt-hours (13 PJ)

Kårstø Power Station is an unused natural gas-fired thermal power plant located at the Kårstø industrial site in the southwestern part of Tysvær Municipality in Rogaland county, Norway. The station lies along the Boknafjorden, about 12 kilometres (7.5 mi) east of the town of Kopervik. The power plant is owned and operated by the Naturkraft company, which is itself equally owned by Statkraft and Statoil. Initial construction costs totaled about 2 billion kr and the turbine was delivered from Siemens. The plant opened on 2 November 2007 and was used intermittently for a few years before being mothballed on 3 October 2014. Approval for decommissioning was granted by the Norwegian government in 2016. Dismantling started in September 2017.

== Capacity ==
The power station has an installed capacity of 420 megawatts (560,000 hp), with an annual production of 3.5 terawatt-hours (13 PJ), equivalent of 3% of the Norwegian electrical production. The power station consumes about 0.6 billion normal cubic meter natural gas per year, or 0.5% of Norwegian natural gas exports. Emissions are 1.2 million tonnes of carbon dioxide and 5 parts per million of nitrogen oxide. The entire output of the station is in electricity, since there is no need for district heating in the uninhabited area. Spill water is emitted at 18 °C (64 °F) and not utilized.

== Decommissioning ==
The power station has been subject to massive controversy in Norway. Kårstø is the first commercial fossil fuel power station in Norway and environmentalists have argued that it is unnecessary to open another power station as long as Norway has the highest use of electricity per capita in the world.

Also long periods of low efficiency due to gas prices as well as the high cost of upgrading the equipment to lower greenhouse gas emissions led to several periods of temporary closures of the plant. These periods of closures increased the corporate losses of about 100 million kr annually for the plant. On 3 October 2014, Naturkraft AS decided to indefinitely suspend production at the power station due to the market situation. The facility continues to be minimally maintained so that at some point in the future it could resume power production. Decommissioning would have no effect on national power supply. Resume of power production is no longer possible, the dismantling and demolition of the plant started in September 2017.

== See also ==
- Energy in Norway
