= Franpipe =

Natural gas pipeline from the Draupner E riser in the North Sea

- Location of Franpipe

Location
- Country: Norway, France
- Start: Draupner E riser platform
- Passes through: North Sea
- To: Port Ouest, Dunkirk, France

General information
- Type: Natural gas
- Owner: Gassled
- Operator: Gassco
- Technical service provider: Statoil
- Commissioned: 1998

Technical information
- Length: 840 km (520 mi)
- Maximum discharge: 19.6 billion cubic meters per year
- Diameter: 42 in (1,067 mm)

The Franpipe is a 840 kilometres (520 mi) long natural gas pipeline from the Draupner E riser in the North Sea to the receiving terminal at Port Ouest in Dunkirk, France. The gas transported to France originates mainly from Sleipner East and Troll Vest gas fields. The pipeline was officially inaugurated on 9 October 1998.

The diameter of pipeline is 42 inches (1,100 mm) and the capacity is 19.6 billion cubic meters of natural gas per year. It cost 10.6 billion NOK. The pipeline is owned by Gassled partners and operated by Gassco. The technical service provider is Statoil.

The Dunkirk receiving terminal is owned by the Gassled partners (65%) and GDF Suez (35%). The Dunkirk terminal is operated by Gassco from Gassco's Zeebrugge control center.
