= Sleipner gas field =

North Sea gas field off the coast of Norway

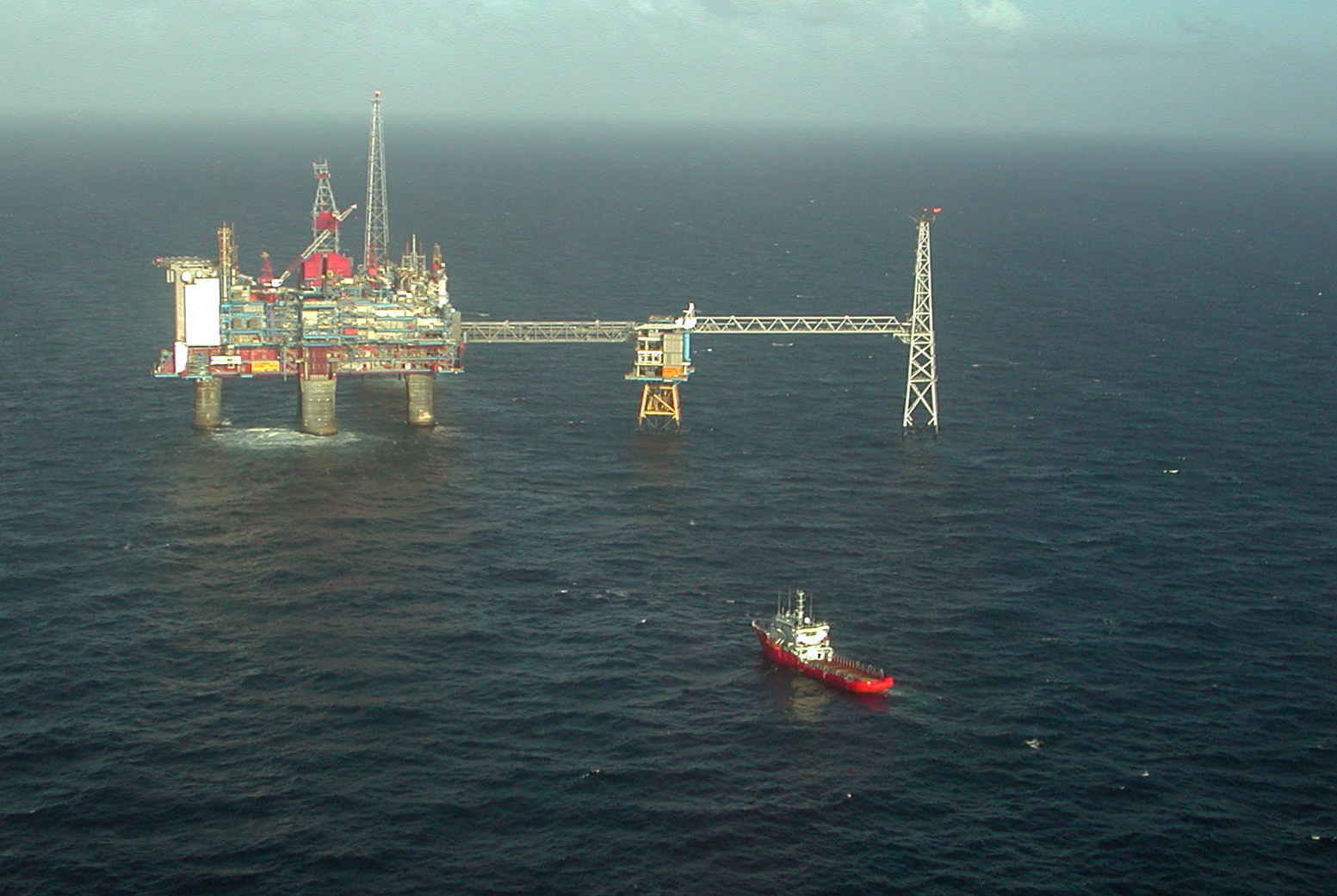

- Location within North Sea
- Country: Norway
- Region: North Sea
- Block: 15/6, 15/8, 15/9
- Offshore/onshore: Offshore
- Coordinates: 58.36°N 1.91°E
- Operator: Statoil
- Partners: Statoil; ExxonMobil; Total S.A.

Field history
- Discovery: 1974

Production
- Current production of gas: 36×10^{6} m^{3}/d (1.3×10^{9} cu ft/d)
- Year of current production of gas: 2005
- Estimated gas in place: 51.6×10^{9} m^{3} (1.82×10^{12} cu ft)

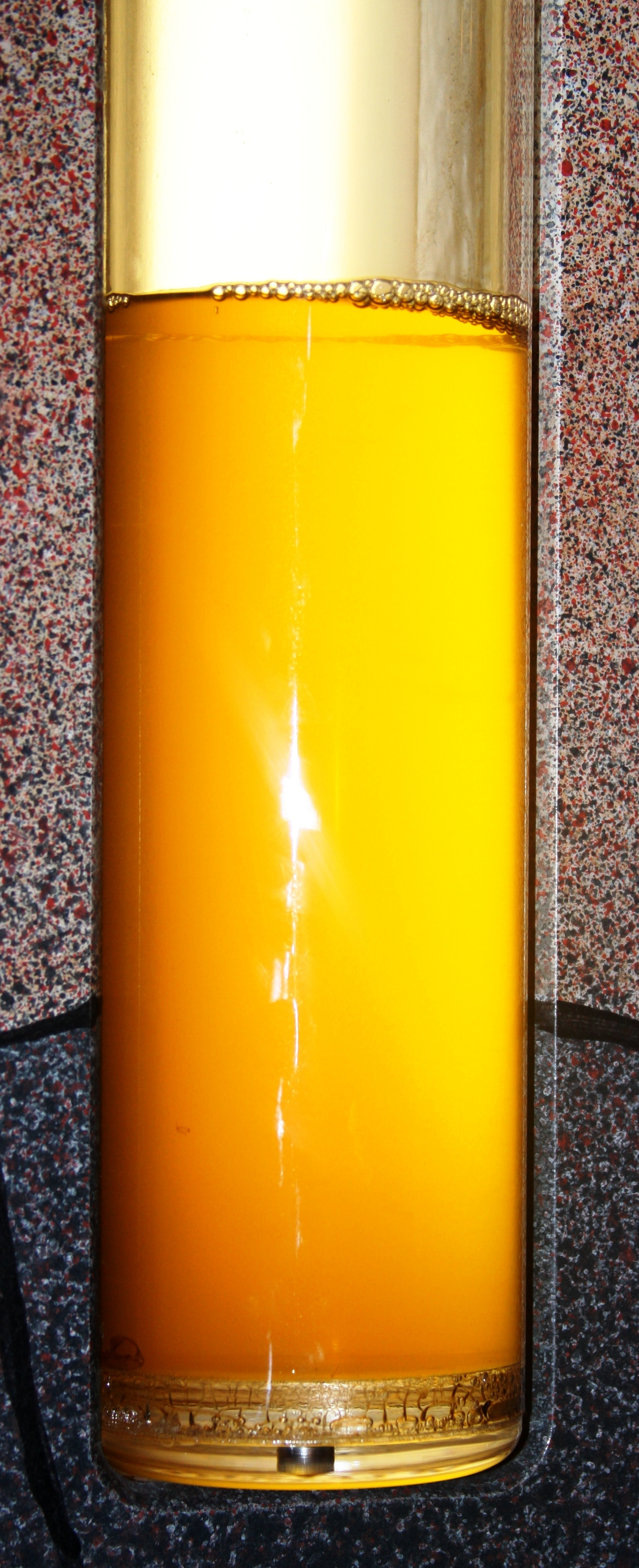
Oil from the Sleipner field.

The Sleipner gas field is a natural gas field in the block 15/9 of the North Sea, about 250 kilometres (160 mi) west of Stavanger, Norway. Two parts of the field are in production, Sleipner West (proven in 1974), and Sleipner East (1981). The field produces natural gas and light oil condensates from sandstone structures about 2,500 metres (8,200 ft) below sea level. It is operated by Equinor. The field is named after the eight-legged steed Sleipnir of Odin, a widely revered god in Norse mythology.

== Reserves and production ==
As of the end of 2005, the estimated recoverable reserves for the Sleipner West and East fields were 51.6 billion cubic meters of natural gas, 4.4 million tonnes (4.9 million short tons) of natural gas liquids, and 3.9 million cubic meters of condensates. Daily production of the field in 2008 was 300 thousand bbl (48 thousand m^{3}) oil equivalents per day, 36 million cubic meters of natural gas per day, and 14,000 cubic meters of condensate per day. In an updated 2017 report, the Norway Petroleum Directorate estimates 2.72 million cubic meters of oil, 11.72 billion cubic meters of natural gas, 0.67 million tons of natural gas liquids, and 0.07 million cubic meters of condensates remain in the reserves.

Sleipner field consists of four platforms. The field is planted with 18 production wells. The Sleipner A platform is located on the Sleipner East and the Sleipner B platform is located on the Sleipner West. Sleipner B is operated remotely from the Sleipner A via an umbilical cable. The Sleipner T carbon dioxide treatment platform is linked physically to the Sleipner A platform by a bridge and to the Sleipner B wellhead platform by 12.5-kilometre (7.8 mi) carbon dioxide flow line. The Sleipner Riser platform, serving the Langeled and Zeepipe pipelines, is located on the Sleipner East field.

== Carbon capture and storage project ==
The Sleipner Vest (West) field is used as a facility for carbon capture and storage (CCS). It is the world's first offshore CCS plant, operative since September 15, 1996. The project, in the initial year, proved insecure due to sinking top sand. However, after a re-perforation and an installation of a gravel layer in August 1997, CCS operations were secure.

Equinor reported that as of 2018, one million tonnes of CO_{2} have been transported and injected into the formation yearly since 1996. Equinor later stated that due to a problem with monitoring equipment, it had over-reported the amount of CO_{2} sequestered from 2017 to 2019 and released new figures that were around 30% less. The project summary reports a capacity of up to 600 billion tonnes (≈660 billion tons).

The Sleipner West field has up to 9% CO_{2} concentration; Norway only allows 2.5% CO_{2} before imposing production export quality penalties, which may have been NOK 1 million/day ( ~$120,000US/ day). Operating costs are US$17 / ton of CO_{2} injected, however, the company does not pay Norway's carbon tax of 1991 and receives carbon credit in the EU's emissions trading system. Before the carbon tax, industries released poor quality CO_{2} into the atmosphere. In a business-as-usual scenario, Norway's emissions would have had a total increase of 3% over 20 years if not for the CCS experiment.

Carbon dioxide is treated on the Sleipner T treatment platform. Following treatment, carbon dioxide is transported to the Sleipner A platform where it is injected into the Utsira formation through a dedicated well c. 1000 meters under the seabed. Using time-lapse gravity and seismic methods, the pioneering Sleipner carbon capture project confirmed the technological viability of injecting and measuring CO_{2} in an offshore reservoir, as well as the effectiveness of mitigating emissions through stable storage. To avoid possible leakages that can result in health hazards and environmental destruction, above the Utsira Formation injection site lies 30 seafloor gravity stations for monitoring under the title, Saline Aquifer CO_{2} Storage. These sites monitor microseismic activity along with gravitational forces and depth metrics. Seafloor height, natural gas production, and tidal shifts determine the gravity measured.

Explicitly regulated under Norway's petroleum law in December 2014 and in line with the EU's 2009/31/EC directive, monitoring objectives focus on assessing gas movement, shell stability, and the effectiveness of remedy scenarios in case of leakage. From 2002 to 2005, measurements identified vertical changes in established metric boundaries, most likely attributed to erosion and marine life. Onsite geochemical and reservoir simulations reveal a main buildup of CO_{2} under the formation's cap seal. However, when the injections are eventually decommissioned, simulations show accumulation proximate to the cap seal in clay layers saturated with sand, which will result in solubility trapping. This solubility trapping, caused by the multiple layers of clay and sand, prevents CO_{2} from rising beyond and will ultimately turn to mineral trapping in the substrate. Furthermore, groundwater flow facilitates better distribution of gases and depressurization, lowering the risk of leakage. The composition reaction of the mixture of clay, sand, and carbon is the determining factor of long-term stability in the Sleipner CCS project. As of 2007, measurements from the gravity stations revealed that the injection of CO_{2} into the Utsira Formation has not resulted in any noticeable seismic activity and that there have been no carbon dioxide leakages in the past 10 years. By 2011, over 13 million tonnes of CO_{2} had been sequestered in the saline aquifer.

Natural gas pipelines' operator Gassco had proposed to build a 240-kilometre (150 mi) carbon dioxide pipeline from Kårstø to transport carbon dioxide from the now decommissioned Kårstø power station. While injection pipelines do not succumb to rusting when transporting CO_{2}, transport pipelines experience low temperatures and high pressures, resulting in dew formation, and subsequently, rust.

== Miocene Utsira Formation ==
The Miocene Utsira Formation is a large aquifer with a stable, layered clay seal. Distributed through multiple phases as a result of sea-level variations caused by glacial events in the Pliocene period, deposits date back to the late Miocene/ early Pliocene to early Pleistocene times, determined by palynology. Upper Pliocene deltaic sand deposits blanket the formation with the highest top sands located roughly 150 meters below sea level. Measured with 3D seismic data, the Utsira sandstone lies underneath 800–1000 meters of sediment under the sea with a maximum thickness of over 300 meters. The Utsira stretches 450 kilometers north to south and 90 kilometers east to west. In the north and south lie deep sand systems, while in the middle region slimmer deposits cover the seafloor. The Tampen area, located in the most northern region, contains lean deposits of glauconitic sand.

== See also ==
- Carbon sequestration
