= Europipe I =

Natural gas pipeline from North Sea to Continental Europe

Europipe I gas pipeline
- Location of Europipe I gas pipeline

Location
- Country: Norway, Germany
- Direction: north–south
- Start: Draupner E riser platform, North Sea
- Passes through: North Sea
- To: Emden, Germany

General information
- Type: natural gas
- Owner: Gassled
- Operator: Gassco
- Technical service provider: Statoil
- Commissioned: 1995

Technical information
- Length: 660 km (410 mi)
- Maximum discharge: 18 billion m^{3}/a (640 billion cu ft/a)
- Diameter: 40 in (1,016 mm)

Europipe I is a 670-kilometre-long (420 mi) natural gas pipeline from the North Sea to Continental Europe.

== History ==
The feasibility study of the pipeline's project was conducted in 1990. On 20 April 1993, an agreement between Norway and Germany was concluded on the construction of Europipe. The pipeline was commissioned on 1 October 1995 and it cost 21.3 billion NOK.

== Route ==
The pipeline runs from the Draupner E riser platform in the North Sea to a receiving terminal at Dornum in Germany. At Draupner E, it is connected with Zeepipe and Statpipe/Norpipe system. From Dornum a 48-kilometre-long (30 mi) land line runs to the metering station in Emden.

== Technical description ==
The diameter of pipeline is 40 inches (1,000 mm) and the capacity is 18 billion cubic metres per annum (640 billion cubic feet per annum) of natural gas.

The pipeline is owned by Gassled partners and operated by Gassco. The technical service provider is Statoil.

== See also ==
- Europipe II
- MIDAL
- Norpipe
