= Kårstø =

Natural gas processing plant in Norway

Coordinates: 59.2774°N 5.5247°E

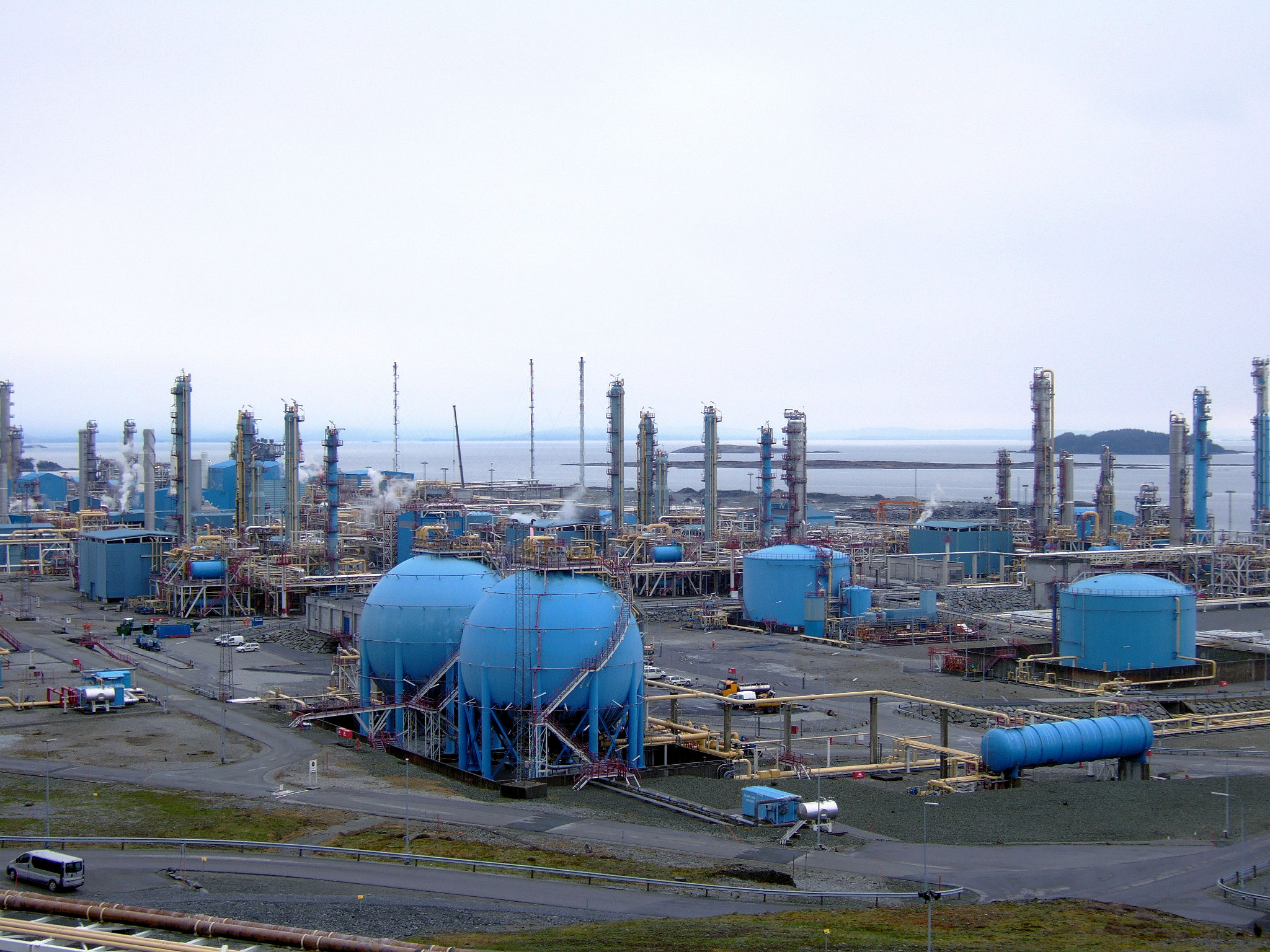
Part of Kårstø-plant

Kårstø is an industrial facility located along the Boknafjorden near the village of Susort in Tysvær Municipality in Rogaland county, Norway. The site features a number of natural gas processing plants that refine natural gas and condensate from the fields in the northern parts of the North Sea, including the Åsgard, Mikkel, and Sleipner gas fields. The Kårstø processing complex is Europe's biggest export port for natural gas liquids (NGL) and the third largest in the world. The industrial site is also the location for the now-closed Kårstø Power Station.

== Operation ==
The first plant on the site opened on 25 July 1985 and it exported the first gas to Germany on October 15 of that year. Gas is transported from the North Sea via Statpipe and Åsgard Transport. Condensate is received from the Sleipner field and stabilised and fractionated in a separate plant that started operation in 1993. About 4,000,000 tonnes (3,900,000 long tons; 4,400,000 short tons) of stabilised condensate are exported from Kårstø each year, by ship.

Natural Gas Liquids (NGL) are separated from the rest of the gas and split into propane, butane, isobutane, naphtha, and ethane. The propane is stored in two large mountain halls with a total capacity of 90,000 tonnes (89,000 long tons; 99,000 short tons). The rest of the refined products are stored in tanks. The facility is the third largest export port for Liquefied Petroleum Gas (LPG) in the world and exported all around the globe. In 2002, 575 shiploads of LPG, ethane, naphtha, and stabilised condensate were sent. Gassnova has been engaged for the development of technology for full-scale CO_{2}-capture at the gas-fired power plant and large-scale transport and geological storage of CO_{2} from Kårstø.

Annual ethane production is 950,000 tonnes (930,000 long tons; 1,050,000 short tons) and this is sold on long term agreements to the companies Borealis, I/S Noretyl, and Norsk Hydro. Dry gas is exported via Europipe II to Dornum in Germany and via Statpipe and Norpipe to Emden. The pipes are owned by Gassled and operated by Gassco. The company Naturkraft (owned by Statkraft and Statoil) operated the Kårstø Power Station, a natural gas-fired thermal power plant at Kårstø from 2007 until 2014.

== Related Reading ==
- Haugan, Bjørn-Erik. "CCS projects in Norway" (PDF).
