= Statpipe =

Location
- Country: Norway
- Direction: north–south
- Start: Statfjord and Heimdal fields
- Passes through: North Sea, Kårstø, Draupner S riser platform
- To: Ekofisk oil field (connected to Norpipe)

General information
- Type: natural gas
- Owner: Gassled
- Operator: Gassco
- Technical service provider: Statoil
- Commissioned: 1985

Technical information
- Length: 890 km (550 mi)
- Maximum discharge: 18.9 billion cubic meters per year
- Diameter: 30 in (762 mm)

The Statpipe pipeline is a natural gas system, which links northern North Sea gas fields with Norway's gas export system. It transports gas from Statfjord, Gullfaks, Heimdal, Veslefrikk, Snorre, Brage and Tordis gas fields.

== History ==
The Statpipe was developed by Statoil. The development plan was approved by the Norwegian Parliament (Storting) on 10 June 1981. The rich gas pipeline from Statfjord became operational on 25 March 1985 and the dry gas pipeline from Kårstø to Ekofisk field came on stream on 15 October 1985. The Draupner S riser platform was installed in 1984 as part of the Statpipe system. In 1998, the Statpipe was connected directly with the Norpipe. On 1 January 2003, the Statpipe was merged into Gassled partnership and Gassco became the operator of the pipeline.

== Technical features ==
The total length of the Statpipe system is 890 kilometres (550 mi). It consists of both rich and dry gas pipelines. The 308-kilometre (191 mi) long rich gas pipeline runs from Statfjord field to the Kårstø gas processing plant. It has branch lines from Snorre and Gulfaks fields. The internal diameter of this pipe is 30 inches (760 mm) and capacity is 9.7 billion cubic metre (bcm) of natural gas per year.

The first leg of the dry gas pipeline runs from Kårstø to the Draupner S riser platform in the North Sea. The length of this line is 228 kilometres (142 mi). The internal diameter of the pipe is 28 inches (710 mm) and capacity is 7.6 bcm of natural gas per year. The second leg runs for 155 kilometres (96 mi) from the Heimdal platform in the North Sea to Draupner S. The diameter of this pipe is 36 inches (910 mm) and capacity 11 bcm per year. The Draupner S riser platform ties the Statpipe lines from Heimdal and Kårstø together for onward transmission to Ekofisk. The internal diameter of this section is 36 inches (910 mm), and it runs for 213 kilometres (132 mi) further south, where a 15.8-kilometre (9.8 mi) bypass around Ekofisk complex takes the Statpipe directly into Norpipe.

In summary the pipelines' details are as follows.

Statpipe pipelines
| Start | Terminal | Length, km | Diameter, inches |
|---|---|---|---|
| Statfjord | Kalstoe | 286 | 30 |
| Kalstoe | 16/11S | 208 | 28 |
| 16/11S | 2/4S | 191 | 36 |
| Heimdal | 16/11S | 155 | 36 |
| Kalstoe | Kaarstoe | 2 × 20 | 28/30 |

The details of the Statpipe riser platforms are as follows.

Statpipe riser platforms
| Platform | Draupner S (16/11S) | 2/4S |
|---|---|---|
| Coordinates | 58°11′19.60″N 2°28′21.6″E | |
| Type | Steel jacket | Steel jacket |
| Function | Riser | Riser |
| Water depth, m | 70 | 70 |
| Design and engineering | John Brown Offshore | John Brown Offshore |
| Jacket fabrication | Aker Trondelag, Verdal | Highlands Fabricators, Nigg |
| Deck fabrication | Aker Verdal/Stord Verft | Haugesund Mek Verksted |
| Jacket weight, tonnes | 16,500 | 16,500 |
| Legs | 4 | 4 |
| Piles | 16 | 16 |
| Topsides weight, tonnes | 7,670 | 6,000 |
| Accommodation | 48 | Bridge link to Ekofisk centre |
| Installation jacket | Summer 1983 | Summer 1983 |
| Installation topsides | Summer 1984 | Summer 1984 |
| Production start | January 1986 | January 1986 |

== Ownership ==
The pipeline is owned by Gassled, operated by Gassco, and the technical service provider is Statoil.
