= Gassled =

Norwegian natural gas pipeline owner

Gassled is a partnership to own the offshore natural gas transportation infrastructure at the Norwegian continental shelf. Its pipelines are operated by Gassco.

Gassled was created in 2002 and it became operational on 1 January 2003. Its original partners were Petoro, Norsk Agip, ExxonMobil, Fortum, Norske Shell, Norsk Hydro, Statoil, TotalFinaElf and ConocoPhillips. As of 4 January 2018, its partners are Petoro (46.697%), Solveig Gas Norway (owned by CPP Investment Board, Allianz Capital Partners, and Infinity Investments – 25.553%), CapeOmega (owned by Partners Group Holdings AG – 11.235%), Silex Gas Norway (owned by Allianz – 6.428%), Infragas Norge (owned by CPP Investment Board – 5.006%), Statoil (5%), and Dea Norge (0.081%). Dea has agreed to sell its stake to CapeOmega.

Originally, Gassled owned Aasgard Transport, Statpipe, Europipe II, Zeepipe, Franpipe, Oseberg Gas Transport, Vesterled and Norpipe, as also the gas treatment complex at Kårstø, and three receiving terminals at Emden in Germany and one at St Fergus in the United Kingdom. Later, also ownership of the receiving terminals at Zeebrugge in Belgium and Dunkerque in France, Europipe I, Kvitebjoern pipeline, Norne Gas Transport System, Langeled pipeline and terminal, and Kollsnes gas processing plant were merged into Gassled.
