= Anders Opedal =

Norwegian business executive

- Born: May 4, 1968 (age 58), Sauda; Norway
- Education: Engineering degree, NTH; MBA, Heriot-Watt University
- Occupation: Business executive
- Employer: Equinor
- Known for: chief operating officer of Equinor
- Title: CEO

Anders Opedal (born 4. May 1968) is the incumbent chief executive officer, and former chief operating officer, of Norwegian oil and gas company Equinor.

He joined the company in 1997 having previously worked for Schlumberger and Baker Hughes. He stepped down from the COO position, and became Equinor's country manager in Brazil in January 2017. On 10 August 2020, Equinor announced Opedal's selection as the company's next chief executive officer, from 2 November 2020 onwards. Opedal holds an MBA from Heriot-Watt University and an engineering degree from NTH.
