= Equinor =

Norwegian energy company

Coordinates: 58°53′30.48″N 5°43′2.82″E

Equinor ASA
- Formerly: Statoil (until 15 May 2018)
- Type: State-owned; Public
- Traded as: OSE: EQNR; NYSE: EQNR
- Industry: Petroleum industry
- Founded: 14 June 1972; 54 years ago
- Headquarters: Stavanger, Norway
- Key people: Jon Erik Reinhardsen (chair); Anders Opedal (CEO)
- Products: Petroleum; Natural gas; Petrochemicals; Electrical power
- Revenue: ▼US$102.5 billion (2024)
- Operating income: ▼US$30.93 billion (2024)
- Net income: ▼US$8.806 billion (2024)
- Total assets: ▼US$131.1 billion (2024)
- Total equity: ▼US$42.34 billion (2024)
- Owner: Government of Norway (67%)
- Number of employees: 25,155 (2024)
- Website: equinor.com

Equinor ASA (formerly Statoil and StatoilHydro) is a Norwegian multinational energy company headquartered in Stavanger, Norway. It is primarily a petroleum company operating in 36 countries with additional investments in renewable energy and lithium mining. In the 2020 Forbes Global 2000, Equinor was ranked as the 169th-largest public company in the world. In 2023, the company was ranked 52nd in the same list. As of 2021, the company has 21,126 employees.

The current company was formed by the 2007 merger of Statoil with the oil and gas division of Norsk Hydro. As of 2017, the Government of Norway is the largest shareholder with 67% of the shares, while the rest is public stock. The ownership interest is managed by the Norwegian Ministry of Petroleum and Energy. The company is headquartered and led from Stavanger, while most of their international operations are currently led from Fornebu, outside Oslo.

Statoil was responsible for 0.52% of global industrial greenhouse gas emissions from 1988 to 2015. According to Carbon Majors, Equinor was responsible for 8.33 million tonnes of CO2 emissions in the period from 1971 to 2024.

The name Equinor was adopted in 2018 and is formed by combining equi, the root for words such as equity, equality, and equilibrium, and nor, indicating that the company is of Norwegian origin. The former name Statoil means 'state oil' in Norwegian, indicating that the company was state-owned.

Former Statoil logo from 1972 to 2007

== History ==
The heritage of Equinor derives from three major Norwegian petroleum companies Statoil, Norsk Hydro, and Saga Petroleum (the latter two merged in 1999).

=== Old Statoil ===
Den Norske Stats Oljeselskap A/S was founded as a limited company owned by the Government of Norway on 14 July 1972 by a unanimous act passed by the Norwegian parliament Stortinget. The political motivation was Norwegian participation in the oil industry on the continental shelf and to build up Norwegian competency within the petroleum industry to establish the foundations of a domestic petroleum industry. Statoil was required to discuss important issues with the Minister of Industry, later Minister of Petroleum and Energy. Statoil was also required to submit an annual report to the parliament.

In 1973, the company started work acquiring a presence in the petrochemical industry. This resulted in the development of processing plants in Rafnes and, in partnership with Norsk Hydro, the Mongstad plant in 1980. In 1981, the company acquired, as the first Norwegian company, operator rights on the Norwegian continental shelf on the Gullfaks field. 1987–88 saw the largest scandal in the company's history, the Mongstad scandal that made the until then unassailable CEO Arve Johnsen withdraw.

In the 1980s, Statoil decided to become a fully integrated petroleum company and started building the Statoil fuel station brand. The stations in Norway originated as Norol stations, while the stations in Denmark and Sweden were purchased from Esso in 1985, and the stations in Ireland were purchased from BP in 1992 and ConocoPhillips Jet in the mid 1990s, then sold by Statoil to Topaz Energy in 2006. Statoil also built up a network of stations in part of Eastern Europe in the 1990s.

In 1990, Statoil was one of several oil companies operating in the North Sea to be affected by a labor strike, which involved about 4,000 oil workers in total. In 1991, the company was the target of a months-long protest and civil disobedience, mainly from Natur og Ungdom and Friends of the Earth Norway. The protesters opposed the building of a new research and development centre at Rotvoll, in Trondheim, Norway, a wetlands area close to the city with significant bird life. However, the R&D center was still built.

The company was privatised and made a public limited company (allmennaksjeselskap) in 2001, becoming listed on both the Oslo Stock Exchange and the New York Stock Exchange. At the same time, it changed its name to Statoil ASA. The government retained 81.7% of the shares. Through further privatization in 2004 and 2005, the government's share was reduced to 70.9%.

The Statoil/Horton case refers to the company's use of bribes in Iran in 2002–2003 in an attempt to secure lucrative oil contracts in that country. This was mainly achieved by hiring the services of Horton Investments, an Iranian consultancy firm owned by Mehdi Hashemi Rafsanjani, son of former Iranian President Hashemi Rafsanjani. Horton Investments was paid US$15.2 million by Statoil to influence important political figures in Iran to grant oil contracts to Statoil. The corruption scandal was uncovered by the Norwegian paper Dagens Næringsliv on September 3, 2003. In 2006, the company accepted a $10.5 million fine for violating the U.S Foreign Corrupt Practices Act.

In September 2007, Statoil and the Brazilian oil company Petrobras signed a deal aimed at expanding exploration, sub-sea, and biofuels cooperation. Under the agreement, Statoil became a partner on six offshore licenses, as well as expanding biofuels production. Petrobras and Statoil announced plans to create dozens of refineries in Brazil and the rest of the world where vegetable oil will be added to crude to create a no-sulphur fuel. On 4 March 2008, Statoil bought Anadarko Petroleum's 50% share of the Peregrino oil field for $1.8 billion.

In 2007, Statoil bought a large area in the Athabasca oil sand field in Canada after purchasing North American Oil Sands Corporation for $2.2 billion. (In 2012, Statoil had 4 oil sand licences (oljesandlisensene ) as part of the Kai Kos Deh Seh project: Leismer, Corner, Hangingstone, and Thornberry).

In 2009, Statoil launched the world's first operational deep-water floating large-capacity wind turbine, Hywind. The 120 metres (390 ft) tall tower with a 2.3 MW turbine was towed 10 kilometres (6.2 mi) offshore into the Amoy Fjord in 220 metres (720 ft) deep water, off of Stavanger, Norway on 9 June 2009 for a two-year test run.

=== Hydro ===
In 1965, Hydro joined Elf Aquitaine and six other French companies to form Petronord to perform searches for oil and gas in the North Sea. Hydro soon became a large company in the North Sea petroleum industry and also became the operator of a number of fields, the first being Oseberg.

In the late 1980s, Hydro acquired the Mobil service stations in Norway, Sweden, and Denmark, changing their name to Hydro. In 1995, Hydro merged its stations in Norway and Denmark with Texaco, creating the joint venture HydroTexaco. The service station chain was sold in 2006 to Reitangruppen. In 1999, Hydro acquired Norway's third-largest petroleum company Saga Petroleum, which had major upstream operations primarily in Norway and the United Kingdom. The British operations were later sold.

=== Merger ===
The logo of StatoilHydro

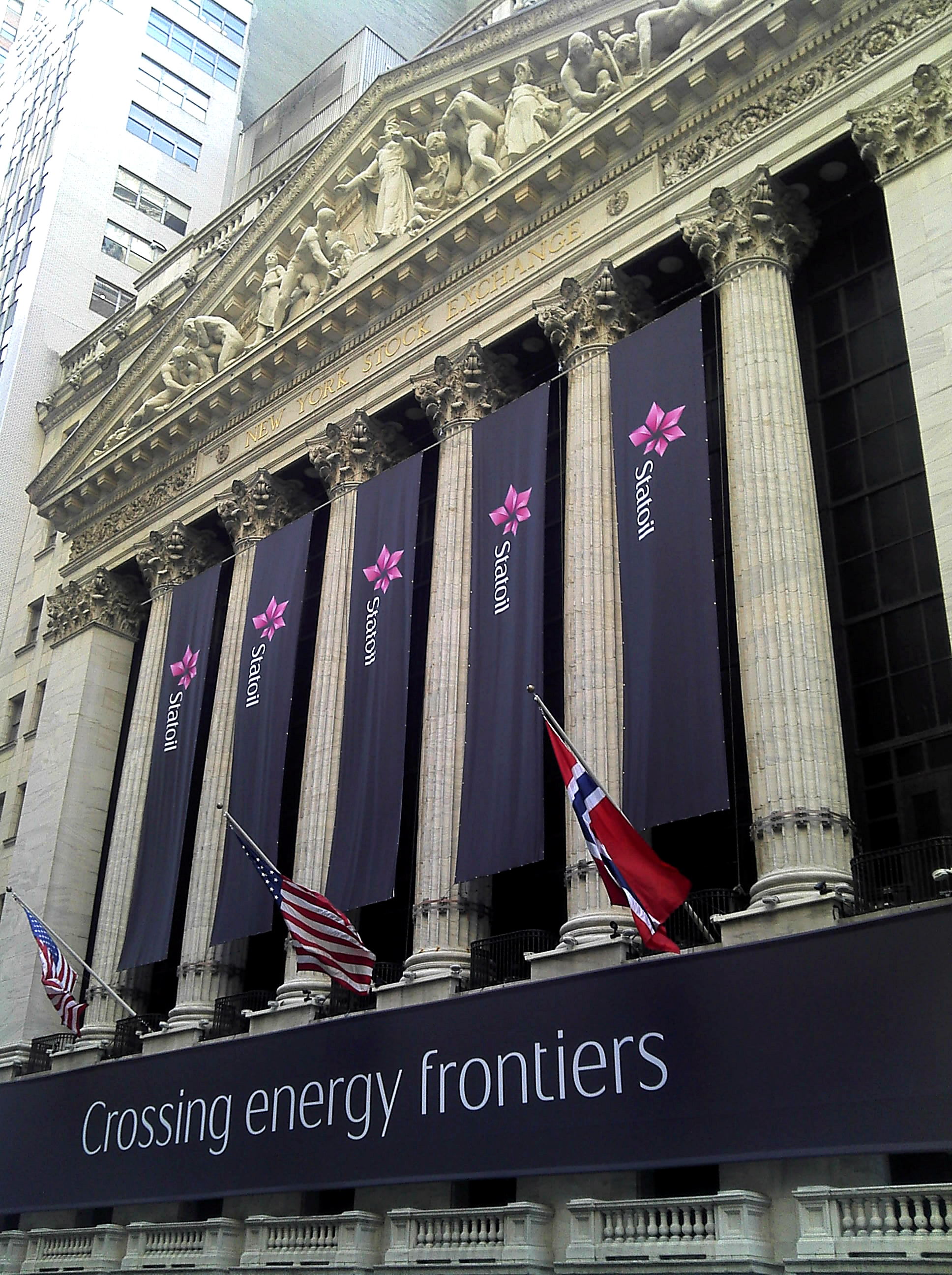
The New York Stock Exchange on 20 June 2011, on the 10th anniversary of when Statoil's shares were listed

A merger proposal was announced in December 2006. Under the rules of the EEA, the merger was approved by the European Union on 3 May 2007 and by the Norwegian Parliament on 8 June 2007. Statoil's shareholders hold 67.3% of the new company, with Norsk Hydro shareholders owning the remaining 32.7%. The Norwegian Government, the biggest shareholder in both Statoil and Norsk Hydro, holds 67% of the company. Jens Stoltenberg, the then Norwegian Prime Minister, commented that he viewed the merger as "the start of a new era...creating a global energy company and strengthening Norway's oil and gas industry."

It has been noted within the analyst community that a proposal will create an entity with much more competitive strength versus its much larger European rivals, including BP, Total, and Shell, while also increasing the ability of the company to make strategic acquisitions, particularly in the Gulf of Mexico. It is the ninth largest oil company in the world, and would be the 48th largest company in the world on the current Fortune Global 500 list with a revenue of NOK 480 billion.

The company's management team was initially to be led by president and CEO Helge Lund (who previously held the same posts at Statoil), with Eivind Reiten, the president and CEO of Hydro, acting as chairman. However, Reiten decided to resign as chairman three days after the merger because of a possible corruption case in Hydro's former oil division. The vice-chair and former Minister of Petroleum and Energy Marit Arnstad was chairperson until 1 April 2008, when Svein Rennemo took up the post on a permanent basis after resigning as the CEO of the Norwegian oil services company Petroleum Geo-Services (PGS).

To reflect a merger of the two companies and with regards of the minor partner, Hydro, it was decided that the joint company should be given a new name. An actual new name was not decided upon at the time of the merger, and StatoilHydro was created for temporary usage only. The firm announced its intention to revert to the name Statoil ASA, and this was approved by the Annual General Meeting in May 2009. The name was changed on 2 November 2009

The Norwegian state's share of the company after the merger was initially 62.5%. As a parliamentary decision in 2001 said it was a goal that the government should own 67% of Statoil, it was announced that the Norwegian government intended to increase its share. In 2009, it was announced that the Norwegian government had reached its goal of obtaining 67% of Statoil's share.

=== Investments and developments after 2009 ===
In 2010, Statoil separated its downstream business into a separate listed company Statoil Fuel & Retail. In 2012 Alimentation Couche-Tard bought Statoil Fuel & Retail for $2.8 billion. On 24 May 2010, Statoil sold a 40% stake in the Peregrino field to Sinochem, the Chinese state-controlled oil company, for a cash sum of $3.07 billion, but retained 60% and the operatorship. On 7 April 2010, Statoil announced finding oil and gas reserves in the Fossekall prospect just north of the Norne oil field in the Norwegian Sea. The proved recoverable oil resources were provisionally estimated at between 37 and 63 million barrels (5,900,000 and 10,000,000 m^{3}), while the volume of associated and free gas was estimated at between 1 and 3 billion standard cubic metres.

In early June 2011, Statoil ASA has divested 24.1% shares in Gassled joint venture for NOK 17.35 billion ($3.25 billion) to Solveig Gas Norway AS and still has 5% shares in the partnership. In 2016 Statoil sold the Leismer oil sand operation in Canada to Athabasca Oil.

In 2011–2012, Statoil announced a new discovery in the North Sea of 0.5 to 1.2 billion barrels (79 to 191 million cubic metres), a large new find at its Aldous Major South prospect on the Norwegian continental shelf with recoverable oil between 0.9 to 1.5 billion barrels (140 to 240 million cubic metres), a large new find at the Skrugard prospect in the northern Norwegian Sea (Barents Sea in Statoil terminology) north of the Snøhvit field off Hammerfest, and a find in the Havis Prospect of the Barents Sea of 200 to 3,000 million barrels (32 to 477 million cubic metres) of oil.

In 2011, Statoil bought Brigham Exploration for $4.4 billion to gain access to its oil shale operations in North Dakota's Bakken formation. In 2012, Statoil sent 45,000 barrels of oil per day by railroad cars from North Dakota. In November 2011, a Statoil consultant and two others were tried for having received 7 million Norwegian kroner, in exchange for contracts and payments totaling "several tenfold" of millions of Norwegian kroner.

In June 2013, Statoil announced a funded joint venture with Petrofrontier Corp. in Australia. Petrofrontier's Georgina Basin shale oil and gas bearing structures consistent with other producing areas in Australia and North America. In 2016, Statoil licensed 66% of the Carcará field in the Santos basin from Petrobras for $2.5 billion. In October 2014, Statoil sold its 15.5% stake in the Shah Deniz gas field in Azerbaijan to Petronas for a fee of $2.25 billion. Since 1 October 2014, Statoil also supplies natural gas to Ukraine's Naftogaz. In 2016, Statoil acquired a $3 million share of a US wind turbine leasing company. Statoil expects oil demand to peak in the 2020s, and continually decline thereafter due to electric transportation.

Despite finding no oil at its large exploration prospect in the Arctic in 2017, Statoil announced in October 2017 that the company would not give up exploring the Arctic.

In October 2017, Statoil commissioned the 30-MW Hywind Scotland floating wind farm 29 kilometres (18 mi) off Peterhead, Scotland. Equinor was contracted to build a wind tower assembly farm in New York City that same year. In March 2018, Statoil acquired a 50% stake in the Polish Bałtyk Środkowy III and Bałtyk Środkowy II (Middle Baltic II/III) offshore wind farms.

In February 2024, Equinor and Deepak Fertilizers and Petrochemicals Corporation limited (DFPCL) entered into a 15-year agreement to supply natural gas liquids annually from 2026. The annual supply will be up to 0.65 million tons of gas.

In May 2025, the ban against working was lifted after a month and Equinor was allowed to continue working on the major offshore wind project for New York. The project at the time had been one-third complete and Equinor had already spent more than half of the $5 billion needed to complete it. This wind farm will be the first connected to New York City's grid once completed.

The Northern Lights CO2 project began operating in August 2025. CO2 is transported to the facility and injected into the Aurora reservoir 2,600 meters under the North Sea bed for storage.

Equinor and Shell merged to create Adura in December 2025, which includes 12 producing oil and gas assets and projects. The joint venture is based in Aberdeen and is expected to deliver over 140,000 barrels of oil equivalent per day. It includes Mariner, Rosebank, Buzzard, Shearwater, Penguins, Gannet, Nelson, Pierce, Jackdaw, Victory, Clair and Schiehallion as well as various exploration licenses.

=== Rebranding to Equinor ===
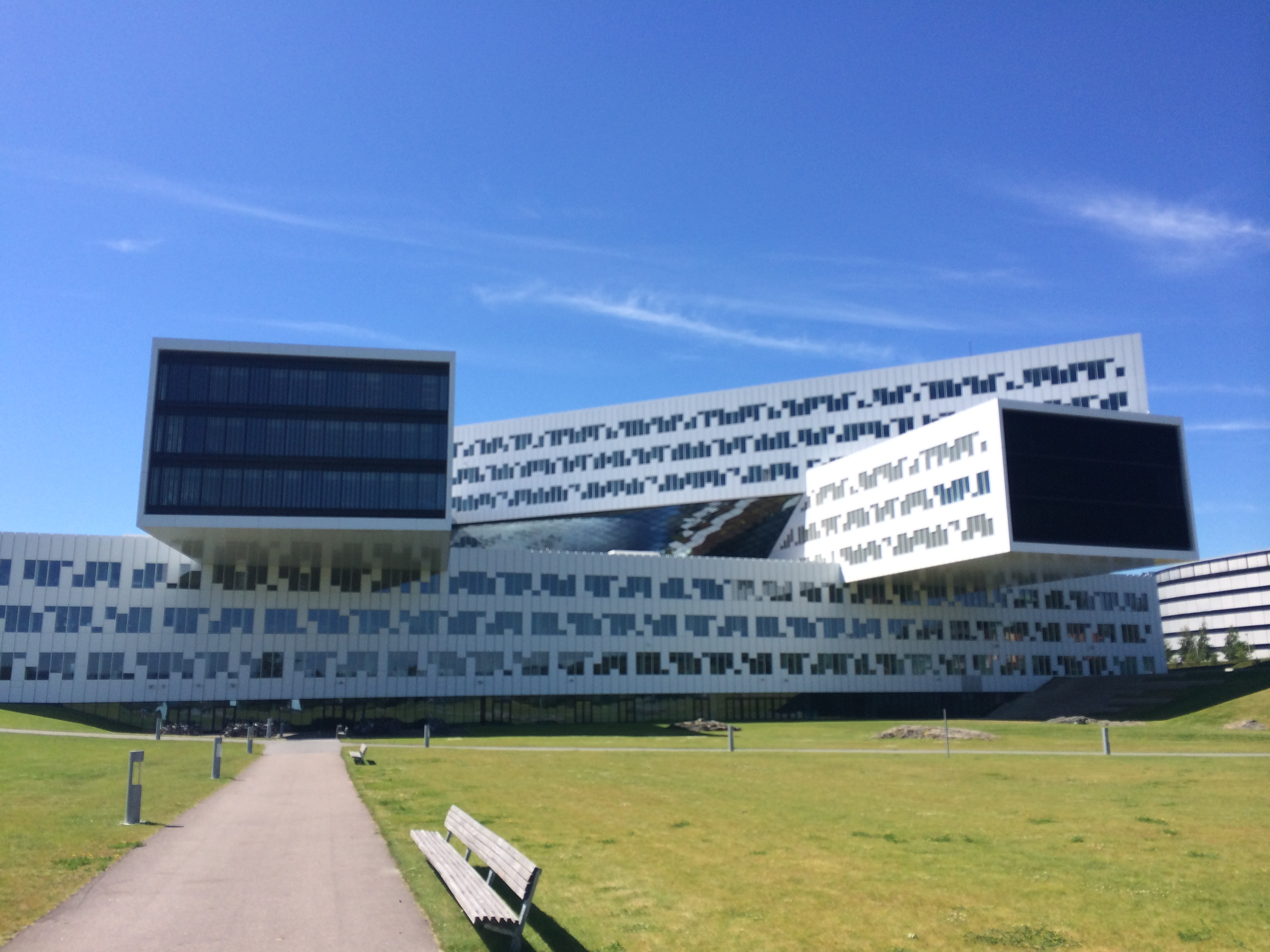
Equinor office building in Fornebu, Oslo (2012)

On 15 March 2018, Statoil announced that it would change its name to Equinor following approval by the annual general meeting.

Between 2007 and 2019, the company reported massive losses, including over USD $21.5 billion lost from its US-based assets. In 2019, the company sold its assets in Eagle Ford, Texas to Repsol for $325 million.

In August 2020, Equinor appointed Anders Opedal as its new CEO. That year, the company announced that it would be decreasing employee numbers by 20% and contractor numbers by half in the United States, Canada and the United Kingdom, in response to falling oil prices.

In January 2021, Equinor acquired a contract to provide off-shore wind power to the city of New York in partnership with BP. The contract with New York State was reportedly the largest offshore wind deal offered by an American state to date. In February 2021, Equinor completed the sale of its shale assets in the Bakken formation of North Dakota to Grayson Mill Energy for $900 million. That month, a spokesperson for the company stated that Equinor was considering further sales of energy assets in the US, in the aftermath of the global oil price war.

In May 2021, Equinor and Italian energy company Eni announced that they were partnering on developing floating wind farms in the North Sea under a contract with the Norwegian government. Equinor partnered with Norwegian renewable energy company Vårgrønn in 2021 to acquire wind acreage in the Utsira Nord region of the North Sea.

== Operations ==
=== Oil and gas exploration and production ===
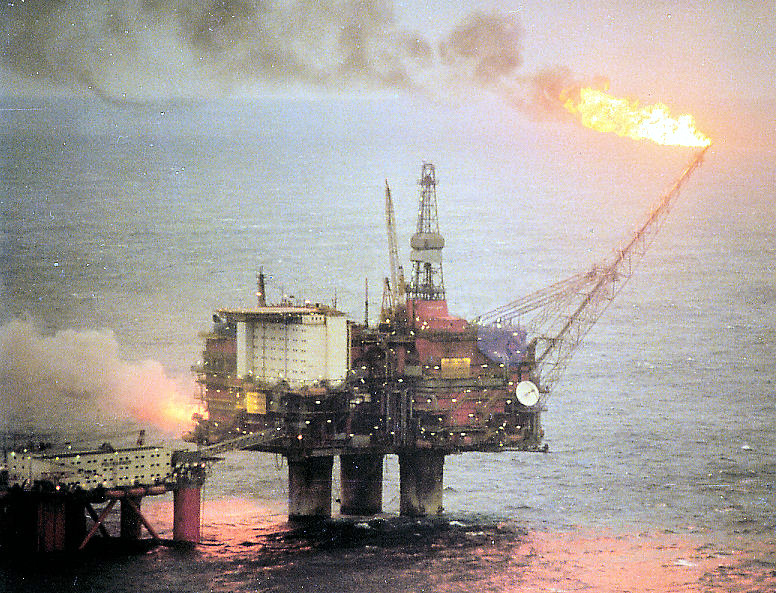
Statoil is operator of Statfjord in the Norwegian North Sea

Equinor is the largest operator on the Norwegian continental shelf, with 60% of the total production. The fields operated are Brage, Heimdal, Grane, Glitne, Gullfaks, Heidrun, Huldra, Kristin, Kvitebjørn, Mikkel, Njord, Norne, Ormen Lange, Oseberg, Sleipner, Snorre, Snøhvit, Statfjord, Sygna, Tordis, Troll, Veslefrikk, Vigdis, Visund, Volve, and Åsgard. The company also has processing plants at Kolsnes, Kårstø, Mongstad, Tjeldbergodden, and Melkøya.

In addition to the Norwegian continental shelf, Equinor operates oil and gas fields in Australia, Algeria, Angola, Azerbaijan, Brazil, Canada, China, Libya, Nigeria, Russia, United Kingdom, United States, and Venezuela. Statoil has offices that are looking for possible ventures in the countries of Mexico, Qatar and the United Arab Emirates. The company has processing plants in Belgium, Denmark, France, and Germany. In 2006, Statoil was given approval to implement the world's largest carbon sequestration project as a means to mitigate carbon emissions to the atmosphere.

Equinor is a partner in Brazil's offshore Peregrino oil field, which came on-stream in 2011. Equinor holds a 15.625% interest in the Deep Blue well on Green Canyon 723 in the deepwater Gulf of Mexico.

Equinor has a long history of attempting to get involved in the Russian petroleum sector. Many partnerships have been entered, but the company has never had a major success in Russia. It partnered with Gazprom and Total on the Shtokman project in the Barents Sea, but this was shelved due to high costs and low gas prices. It then shifted from partnership with Gazprom to Rosneft, and in the two companies, have drilled for oil in several areas of Russia, again without any major finds. After the introduction of international sanctions during the Russo-Ukrainian War against Russia, Equinor has kept a much lower public profile on its Russian activities while continuing largely as before. Equinor left Russia in September 2022 after striking a deal with Rosneft, selling its Russian assets and transferring future liabilities and investment commitments for one euro.

The Norwegian economics professor Karl Ove Moene has, in the Norwegian business daily Dagens Næringsliv, raised the question of Equinor and resource curse. Much economic research show that, while natural resources are positive for nations with sound political structures, such as Norway, they are negative for nations with unsound political structures, and will, despite the riches, result in a lower economic growth. Besides his own research, Moene also points to similar results from Paul Collier.

In 2024, Equinor sold its assets in Nigeria to Chappal Energies for $1.2 billion and its assets in Azerbaijan to Indian ONGC for $745 million.

In March 2025, the $8.14 billion Johan Castberg oilfield went into production and was expected to repay the construction amount in less than two years. The floating, production, storage, and offloading vessel (FPSO) has a capacity of 220,000 barrels of oil a day.

In July 2025, Equinor discovered natural gas in the Barents sea, near the Johan Casterberg field. At the end of August 2025, Equinor found oil and gas in two reservoirs in the Fram area of the North Sea. One discovery was of oil and gas, the other one just gas.

=== Pipeline operations ===
Equinor is involved in a number of pipelines, including Zeepipe, Statpipe, Europipe I and Europipe II, and Franpipe from the Norwegian continental shelf to Western Europe in addition to the Baku-Tbilisi-Ceyhan pipeline in Caucasus. The pipelines from Norway are organized through Gassled. In the North Sea, Equinor operates the Oseberg Transport System, Kvitebjørn oil pipeline, Heidrun gas pipeline, Sleipner East pipeline and Vestprosess pipeline.

The company has trading offices for crude oil, refined petroleum products, and natural gas liquids in London, Stamford, Connecticut, and Singapore.

=== Solar ===
Equinor has stakes in solar power projects in Latin America and Northwestern Europe.

In Brazil, Equinor has a 43.5% stake in the Apodi Solar plant in Ceará and a 30% stake in the Mendubim complex of solar plants in the Rio Grande do Norte. In Bahia, another solar plant is expected to be completed by the end of 2025 and will be fully owned by Equinor.

In Poland, Equinor owns three solar plants producing about 171MW. Another 20MW solar plant is current under construction as of October 2025.

In Denmark, Equinor owns a 65MW solar plant in Jutland.

In Sweden, Equinor owns a 95MW solar plant in Alvesta.

=== Wind energy ===
Equinor owns and operates the 30-MW Hywind Scotland floating wind farm 29 kilometres (18 mi) off Peterhead, Scotland. Equinor owns 50% stake in the Polish 1,200-MW Bałtyk Środkowy III and Bałtyk Środkowy II offshore wind farms. It also owns 25% stake in the 385-MW Arkona wind farm offshore Germany. Equinor operates the Sheringham Shoal Offshore Wind Farm with 40% stake in the project and has 50% stake in each Creyke Beck A and B and Teesside A wind farms of the Dogger Bank Wind Farm development in the United Kingdom.

In February 2025, Equinor announced that they would cut investments in renewables to $5bn over the next two years, down from about $10bn. In August 2025, Equinor and SSE finalized a seabed lease with the Crown Estate to progress the Dogger Bank D offshore wind project.

=== Petrol stations ===
Statoil operated an extensive network of fuel stations across Northern and Eastern Europe, primarily under the Statoil brand, alongside automated stations branded 1-2-3. Following the 2007 merger with Norsk Hydro's oil and gas operations, the company also operated stations under the Hydro and Uno-X brands in Sweden. Following the 2007 merger with Norsk Hydro's oil and gas operations, Statoil also took over Hydro's network of 426 fuel stations in Sweden, operating under the Hydro and Uno-X brands.

In October 2006, Statoil sold its Irish fuel retail and distribution business to Topaz Energy, ending its petrol station operations in Ireland.

In September 2007, Statoil announced an agreement to acquire the Scandinavian Jet fuel station network from ConocoPhillips, covering Denmark, Norway and Sweden. The acquisition was approved by the European Commission in October 2008, subject to the divestment of certain stations to address competition concerns. In April 2009, Statoil agreed to sell 198 automated stations to the Finnish company St1, comprising 118 Hydro and Uno-X stations and 40 Jet stations in Sweden, together with 40 Jet stations in Norway.

In October 2010, Statoil separated its fuel retail operations into Statoil Fuel & Retail, which was listed on the Oslo Stock Exchange, with Statoil retaining a 54% ownership stake. As of June 2010, the business operated approximately 2,290 fuel stations across eight countries: Denmark, Estonia, Latvia, Lithuania, Norway, Poland, Russia and Sweden. Its activities also included the distribution of aviation and marine fuels, lubricants and other petroleum products.

In 2012, the Canadian convenience store operator Alimentation Couche-Tard acquired Statoil Fuel & Retail for approximately US$2.6 billion. The Jet stations retained by the company in Denmark and Sweden were rebranded as Ingo in 2014. In September 2015, Couche-Tard announced plans to replace the Statoil retail brand with Circle K as part of a global rebranding initiative. The transition began in Europe in May 2016, while Ingo continued operating as a separate brand.

== Finances ==
For the fiscal year 2018, Equinor reported earnings of US$7.535 billion, with an annual revenue of US$79.593 billion, an increase of 30.1% over the previous fiscal cycle. Equinor's shares traded at over $18 per share, and its market capitalization was valued at over US$55.5 billion in October 2018. In the fourth quarter of 2021, Equinor had a profit of $15 billion.

Year	Revenue in million US$	Net income in million US$	Total Assets in mil. US$	Price per Share in US$	Employees
2005	60,690	4,775	44,907	9.23	
2006	66,155	6,344	49,276	10.97	
2007	89,399	7,643	82,727	13.34	
2008	117,291	7,784	104,058	7.53	
2009	73,967	2,834	90,054	11.80	
2010	87,330	6,242	106,611	11.70	30,400
2011	119,766	14,079	137,350	13.10	31,715
2012	124,425	11,851	134,917	13.29	23,028
2013	108,613	6,799	150,906	13.30	23,413
2014	99,264	3,871	132,702	10.16	22,516
2015	59,642	−5,192	109,742	8.36	21,581
2016	45,873	−2,922	104,530	11.39	20,539
2017	61,187	4,590	111,100	14.06	20,245
2018	79,593	7,535	112,508	14.06	20,525
2019	64,357	1,843	118,063	13.89	21,212
2020	45,818	−5,510	124,809	12.01	21,245
2021	90,924	1,843	147,120	19.78	21,936
2022	150,806	28,746	158,021	28.10	21,936
2023	107,174	11,885	143,580	27.13	23,000
2024	103,774	8,806	131,141	22.68	24,641

== Human rights ==
In 2016, Equinor (then Statoil) was ranked as the 5th best of 92 oil, gas, and mining companies on indigenous rights in the Arctic.

== Involvement with Norwegian government ==
The Norwegian government owns a 67% share in Equinor, giving the Norwegian government majority control of the company.

=== Interactions with the Norwegian government ===
Equnior generated a total of NOK 1,029.6 billion ($91.83 billion USD) in 2023 and NOK 701 billion ($62.52 billion USD) in 2024 for the Norwegian government, with the Norwegian government predicting that Equinor will generate NOK 643 billion ($57.35 billion USD) in 2025. Most of the generated money comes from taxes, with the Norwegian government charging a special tax on petroleum deposits, equating to a 78% combined marginal tax rate on Equinor's oil operations. The Norwegian government's ownership of Equinor is part of a larger strategy of state ownership in certain industrial sectors, namely those involving natural resources. Revenue generated from Equinor is placed in the Government Pension Fund Global (GPFG), which has become the world's largest single sovereign wealth fund in terms of total assets under management.

=== State-owned corporate structural changes and impacts ===
Yale researchers have noted that decisions by the Norwegian Government tend to be more focused on long-term sustainability, while public shareholders make decisions more focused on immediate economic gains; since the Norwegian Government has a majority share, this has generally resulted in Equinor's corporate policies and actions favoring long-term sustainability. The Norwegian Royal Ministry of Trade, Industry and Fisheries is the Ministry in charge of the Norwegian Government's shares in Equinor, who have declared that their goal with Equinor is to achieve "the highest possible return over time in a sustainable manner." Economists credit this long-term planning from the Norwegian Government with enabling Equinor to more easily transition to renewable energy than oil companies with private shareholders interested in short-term profit.

Major public interest, as well as policy by the Norwegian government, have caused Equinor to operate with a high degree of transparence. Specifically, the government of Norway has transparency as one of their "10 principles for good corporate governance" policy, published in 2002. This transparency helped amplify the impacts of a scandal in 2014, when Equinor's losses in North American investments were quickly exposed, including a 16-page report by the Norwegian newspaper Dagens Næringsliv.

Equinor has also come under public scrutiny for causing greenhouse gas emissions. Protests in 2014, namely at the University of Bergen, pressured Equinor (then called Statoil) to reduce its greenhouse gas emissions. Within Norway, groups such as Equinor Out have been placing pressure on Equinor to reduce its use of oil and natural gas, with Equinor Out's stated objective being to have Equinor "end all exploration and development of new oil and gas, and fully transition to renewable energy." Equinor and the Norwegian Government have also come under pressure from other investors in Equinor to reduce Equinor's greenhouse gas emissions, and as a result, Equinor has begun to move towards renewable energy.

=== Energy transition ===
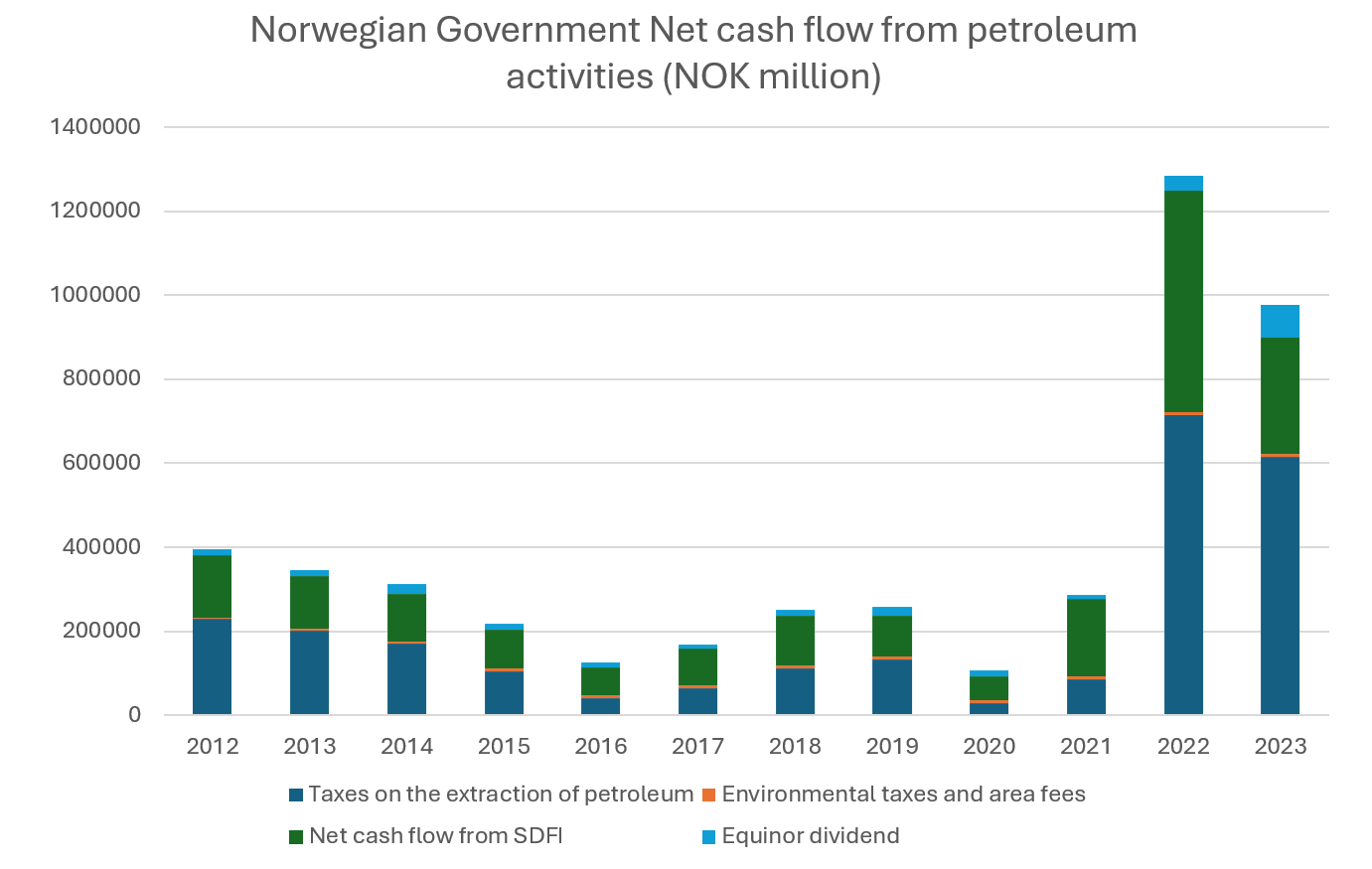
A chart showing the Norwegian government's income from petroleum by NOK million, further divided by the source of the income. Note the sudden rise in 2022. Data from Statistics Norway.

In 2007, Equinor's bylaws were changed, allowing the company to pursue business in "other forms of energy" apart from oil and natural gas. This was followed by Equinor's rebranding from Statoil to Equinor in 2018, to reflect this focus on renewable energy, and in 2020, Equinor published a plan for reaching carbon neutrality by 2050. However, Equinor's profits from oil significantly increased in 2022, which economists credit to the 2022 Russian invasion of Ukraine and the resulting ban on Russian natural gas in the EU. Equinor's income decreased in 2023, and this is partially seen as being a result of investments in renewable energy; however, Norwegian Prime Minister Jonas Gahr Stoere spoke in support of Equinor continuing to move towards renewable energy despite the lower income.

== Controversies ==
=== Mongstad scandal ===
In November 1987, several members of the board offered their resignation over approximately $780 million worth of cost overruns at the Mongstad refinery. It was seen as a big scandal in the Norwegian press.

=== Corrib gas project ===
Equinor was a partner of Royal Dutch Shell in the Corrib gas project, which had been developing a natural gas field off the northwest coast of County Mayo, Ireland. Citizens protested the project on the grounds that they had been insufficiently consulted and that the pipeline posed a danger. In the summer of 2005, five men from Rossport were jailed for contempt of court after refusing to obey a temporary court injunction which forbade interfering with the project. The ensuing protests led to the Shell to Sea campaign which opposed the project. In November 2021, Equinor exited the project after selling its 36.5% stake to Vermilion Energy for $434 million (€382 million).

=== Iran corruption lawsuit ===
The Statoil corruption case, also known as the Statoil-Horton case (Norwegian: Statoils Horton-sak), refers to Norwegian oil company Statoil's misconduct and extensive use of bribery in Iran between 2002 and 2003 in an attempt to secure lucrative oil contracts for the company in that country. On June 29, 2004, Statoil was found guilty of corruption by the Norwegian courts and was ordered to pay NOK 20 million in fines. On October 13, 2006, Statoil reached a settlement with US authorities for its involvement in the case and was ordered by a US court to pay US$21 million in fines.

=== North Sea oil projects ===
In March 2011, Statoil halted work on two North Sea oil field projects and laid off thousands of people due to a £2 billion U.K. tax on the sector.

=== Charges of unethical practices in Athabasca ===
In 2012, a UK company, Ecclesiastical Investment, announced they were selling their stake in Statoil, as a result of perceived unethical practices related to Athabasca oil sands projects.

=== Arctic ===
In May 2012, Equinor signed an Arctic exploration deal with Rosneft. In June 2014, Statoil announced it had completed a 12-month exploration program of its Castberg license project in the Arctic and found less-than-expected oil reserves. Production, which had originally been planned to start in 2018, was temporarily shelved while the company and its partners reassessed the viability of the project and explored ways to reduce development costs.

=== Great Australian Bight ===
Exploration for oil and gas in the Great Australian Bight first began in the late 1960s. Not long ago, several oil majors, BP, Statoil/Equinor, and Chevron proposed plans to drill exploration wells in the southern part of the area from 2017 onwards. On October 11, 2016, BP withdrew its plans to explore the area claiming that it was not competitive and did not align with BP's strategic goals. The proposal to explore in the bight was the focus of community opposition. The Wilderness Society showed that a worst-case scenario leak of oil could have a catastrophic effect on the southern coastline of Australia. The Australian Senate commenced an inquiry into oil or gas production in the Great Australian Bight on 22 February 2016. The committee was reestablished on 13 September 2016 following the Australian Federal Election.

In October 2017, Chevron withdrew from the project, but it returned alongside BP in 2019. Though the National Offshore Petroleum Safety and Environmental Management Authority approved exploration plans in late 2019, Equinor withdrew from the project in February 2020, citing profitability reasons.

=== Losses in the United States ===
In 2020, a report revealed important issues regarding $20 billion lost in the United States. According to Equinor chairman Jon Erik Reinhardsen, the losses were driven by an ambitious growth strategy and overly optimistic price assumptions.

=== Censorship of the Science Museum ===
In 2023 it was revealed that an Equinor sponsorship agreement of the Wonderlab exhibition at the Science Museum, London contained a gag clause preventing the museum or its trustees "make any statement or issue any publicity or otherwise be involved in any conduct or matter that may reasonably be foreseen as discrediting or damaging the goodwill or reputation of the sponsor".

=== Emissions reductions claims ===
As the production and use of petroleum products are a major source of carbon dioxide emissions, climate change and international climate agreements have posed a challenge to Equinor as an oil company with ambitions to be viewed as sustainable. Fossil fuels account for more than two thirds of total global greenhouse gas emissions. In their sustainability reports from 2009 Equinor concurs that one of their "main challenges is to reduce greenhouse gas (GHG) emissions resulting from the production and use of our products" (p. 50) and from 2006 that "as an oil and gas company, we are part of the problem" (p. 35).

Equinor was one of the first fossil fuel organizations to acknowledge the reality of climate change. Although they perform well in international ratings of socially responsible companies, it has been questioned whether a fossil fuel company such as Equinor can describe their operations as environmentally sustainable or green. In order to be able to label themselves as sustainable, Equinor has been found to highlight how they strive to cut emissions, to utilize a rhetoric that pictures fossil fuels as the only currently realistic main source for energy and their management of oil and gas resources as sustainable enough until technological progress will provide alternative sources for energy. This rhetoric has been labeled "climate obstruction", that is, where "an actor acknowledges climate change and other environmental issues while simultaneously supporting harmful practices that delay substantial climate action" (p. 10).

== Corporate structure ==
=== Board of directors ===
Comprised as follows as of April 2024:

- Jon Erik Reinhardsen, former CEO of Petroleum Geo-Services (2008-2017)
- Anne Drinkwater, former CEO of BP Canada
- Jonathan Lewis, former CEO of Capita
- Finn Bjørn Ruyter, former CEO of Hafslund
- Haakon Bruun-Hanssen, former Chief of Defence of Norway
- Mikael Karlsson, current vice chairman and Partner at Actis Capital
- Fernanda Lopes Larsen, former EVP at Yara International
- Tone Hegland Bachke, former Telenor CFO
- Stig Lægreid, employee-representative
- Per Martin Labråthen, employee-representative, head of the Styrke trade union's Equinor branch
- Hilde Møllerstad, employee-representative, petroleum technologist

=== Lobbying ===
Equinor engages professional lobbyists to represent its interests in various jurisdictions. In South Australia, it is represented by Hawker Britton.

== Environmental record ==
Equinor and Shell were planning on building a gas-fired powerplant in Norway that would infuse CO_{2} underground or beneath the seabed, but they discarded the plan due to economic reasons. Equinor has injected CO_{2} into the Utsira formation on the Sleipner gas field for environmental storage purposes since 1996. Natural gas (methane) containing approximately 8.5% CO_{2} is produced on the Sleipner Vest field. The gas is transported to the Sleipner Treatment platform, where the CO_{2} is removed. The gas is exported to the UK, Germany, and Belgium, and the CO_{2} is injected into the Utsira formation.

Equinor is also a founding member of Methane Guiding Principles, an industry consortium that aims to reduce methane emissions throughout the oil and gas supply chain.

== Sponsorship ==
Equinor sponsors talents in art, education, and sports through the program Morgendagens helter (Tomorrow's heroes).

Two musical prizes are included in the program. As of 2013, the grant for both awards is of 1 million NOK (about $95,000). The Statoil classical music award has been awarded since 1999. The Statoil stipend to a Norwegian pop/rock artist or group has been awarded since 2008 during the by:Larm festival and is meant to stimulate an international career.

The program also includes an art prize, Statoils kunstpris, that has been awarded every second year since 2007 to a talented artist in Norway. The grant is 500,000 NOK (about $48,000) which makes it Norway's largest prize of its kind.

Sponsorship for sports includes support for football and skiing. Sponsorship for education focuses on natural sciences and included a yearly competition for high school students in Norway where Statoils realfagspris is awarded.

Statoil was an official sponsor of the 2011 FIS Nordic World Ski Championships that was held in Oslo.
