= Gassco =

Norwegian natural-gas pipeline operator

Gassco AS
- Type: State owned
- Industry: Petroleum
- Founded: 2001
- Headquarters: Kopervik, Norway
- Key people: Frode Leversund (CEO)
- Products: Natural gas pipelines
- Owner: Government of Norway
- Number of employees: 352 (2017)
- Website: www.gassco.no

Gassco is a Norwegian state owned company that operates 8,800 kilometres (5,500 mi) of natural gas pipes and associated riser platforms and land-based facilities transporting annually of 100 billion cubic meter (bcm) of natural gas from the Norwegian continental shelf to Continental Europe and Great Britain.

9% of the total consumption of natural gas in Continental Europe is distributed through Gassco. The actual ownership is organised through various licences, with Gassled, being the largest. Gassled is owned by Petoro.

== History ==
Gassco was founded by the Ministry of Petroleum and Energy (MPE) on 14 May 2001, and took over the operatorship of all gas transport from the Norwegian continental shelf on 1 January 2002. This activity had previously been carried out by several companies, and the creation of Gassco formed part of an extensive reorganisation of Norway's oil and gas sector in 2001. It complied with the requirements stipulated in the European Union's gas market directive for organising transport operations in this sector.

The political considerations which underpinned the creation of Gassco found expression in proposition no 36 (2000–01) to the Storting (parliament) and the subsequent recommendation from the Storting's standing committee on the environment. These documents specified in part that transport and processing plants must serve all gas producers, and that Gassco must act in a neutral manner towards these. The company was assigned a key role in the further development of the gas transport system, which would contribute to efficient overall utilisation of resources on the NCS. More about Gasscos history.

== Operator duties ==
Gassco is the operator for the integrated system for transporting gas from the Norwegian continental shelf to other European countries. This role confers overall responsibility for running the infrastructure on behalf of the owners. Frame conditions for the company are determined by the Norwegian government. That also applies to the relationship between Gassco and the owners of the gas transport system. The company exercises its operator responsibility pursuant to the Norwegian Petroleum Activities Act and to agreements with the transport system owners.

As operator, Gassco plays several roles. The work it carries out on behalf of the transport system owners is usually designated the normal operatorship. The owners finance most of the major investments in the transport system and recognise this spending in their own accounts. Gassco's responsibility for system operation and capacity administration is usually referred to as the special operatorship. Directly authorised by the Petroleum Activities Act, this work is conducted for all users of the Norwegian gas transport system.

The cost of operating the transport system is met by its users through tariff payments. The capital element in these tariffs also covers investment made by the owners. Pursuant to the Petroleum Activities Act, Gassco additionally has the right and duty to pursue unified further development of the gas infrastructure. Gassco does not make a profit or a loss from its own operations.

== Processing plants ==
Gassco operates three Norwegian gas processing plants, namely the Kårstø processing plant, the Kollsnes processing plant and the Nyhamna processing plant.

The Kårstø plant, north of Stavanger, plays a key role in the transport and treatment of gas and condensate (light oil) from central parts of the Norwegian continental shelf. This facility separates the rich gas arriving in the Statpipe and Åsgard Transport pipelines into its various components. It also handles unstabilised condensate piped from the Sleipner area. These flows yield methane, ethane, propane, iso and normal butane, naphtha (natural gasoline) and stabilised condensate.

Dry gas – methane and some ethane – is transported on through Statpipe dry gasand Europipe II, while the natural gas liquids and condensate are exported by ship.Kårstø ranks as one of the world's largest producers of liquefied petroleum gases – propane and butanes – and this LPG is shipped to customers world-wide. The facility had 638 ship calls in 2006 to load LPG, naphtha and stabilised condensate. Propane is stored in two large artificial rock caverns with a combined capacity of 250 000 m3. Ethane, normal and iso butane, naphtha and stabilised condensate are held in tanks. First gas reached the complex on 25 July 1985 through a pipeline from the Statfjord field in the North Sea, and the first dry gas was piped on to Emden in Germany on 15 October that year. Kårstø runs primarily on fuel gas. Five of its nine compressors use this energy source, while the remaining four are electrically powered.

The gas processing plant at Kollsnes forms part of the Troll Gas development, and became operational on 1 October 1996. The processing capacity at Kollsnes has been increased several times since the facility became operational. Today the daily processing capacity is up to 143 million scm of gas and 69 000 barrels of NGL, piped in from the Troll, Kvitebjørn and Visund fields. The increased capacity at Kollsnes is a result of several considerable investments. In 2004 a new NGL extraction plant started up, in 2005 a new compressor was installed on the Troll A platform and in 2006 a sixth export compressor became operational at Kollsnes. The treatment process at Kollsnes involves separating out the NGL, and compressing the dry gas for export via Statpipe, Zeepipe, Europipe I and Franpipe. The Vestprosess system ties Kollsnes to the oil refinery at Mongstad with a pipeline for NGL. Gas has been delivered from the Troll processing plant to the nearby Kollsnes Industry Park since 1999.

Gassco submitted a decommissioning program in February 2024 for the removal of the Knarr Gas Pipeline. The pipeline was fed from the Knarr Field which ceased production in May 2022.

In April 2024, Gassco signed a memorandum of understanding (MoU) with Gascade Gastransport GMBH for a new hydrogen pipeline in the North Sea between Germany and Norway.

Gassco was authorized in April 2025 by the Norwegian Ocean Industry Authority that it can add a new connection point from the Troll B platform to the Kvitebjørn pipeline.

== Receiving terminals ==
Gassco operates several gas receiving terminals in Europe.

Germany

- EMS – Emden
- Norsea Gas Terminal
- ERF – Dornum

Great Britain

- Easington
- St Fergus

Belgium and France

- Zeepipe terminal JV
- Dunkerque

== Pipelines and platforms ==
Gassco is responsible as operator for transporting Norwegian gas to continental Europe and the UK through a 7 975-kilometre network of pipelines.

- Haltenpipe
- Europipe
- Europipe II
- Norne Gas Transport
- Franpipe
- Åsgard Transport
- Norpipe
- Statpipe Rich Gas
- Statpipe Dry Gas
- Vesterled
- Oseberg Gas Transport
- Zeepipe
- Langeled
- Tampen Link
- Kvitebjørn gas export
- Gjøa gas pipeline

Platforms

- Draupner S/E
- Heimdal Riser
- B-11
