= Skirne gas field =

Offshore gas field in the North Sea

- Location within North Sea
- Country: Norway
- Region: North Sea
- Block: 25/5-3, 25/5-4
- Offshore/onshore: offshore
- Coordinates: 59°35′8.01″N 2°37′46.94″E
- Operator: Total E&P Norge AS
- Partners: Total S.A., Petoro, Centrica

Field history
- Discovery: 1990
- Start of production: 2004

Production
- Current production of gas: 140×10^{6} cu ft/d (4.0×10^{6} m^{3}/d)
- Estimated gas in place: 230×10^{9} cu ft (6.5×10^{9} m^{3})
- Producing formations: Middle Jurassic sandstones

Skirne, which also includes the Byggve deposit, is an offshore gas field in the North Sea located 24 kilometres (15 mi) east of the Heimdal gas field and 140 kilometres (87 mi) from Stavanger, Norway. The depth of the water in the field area is 120 metres (390 ft). Both Skirne and Byggve are considered satellites to Heimdal field and are connected to it by subsea pipelines. TotalFinaElf which is the operator had received the approval from Norwegian Ministry of Petroleum and Energy for development of the fields in 2002. The company holds 40% interest in the project. Other stakeholders are Petoro and Centrica. Both Skirne and Byggve combined have an estimated 230 billion cubic feet (6.5×10^{9} m^{3}) of natural gas and about 10 million barrels of condensate.

== Skirne deposit ==
The Skirne field was discovered in 1990. It consists of Middle Jurassic sandstones of the Brent Group. Skirne deposit lies 2,370 metres (7,780 ft) deep.

== Byggve deposit ==
The Byggve field is located 16 km (9.9 mi) east of the Heimdal gas field and was discovered in 1991. and consists of Middle Jurassic sandstones of the Brent Group. Byggve deposit lies 2,900 metres (9,500 ft) deep.

== Production ==
Production at Skirne and Byggve started in 2004. Expected project duration is 6 years and produce 140 million cubic feet per day (4.0×10^{6} m^{3}/d) of gas and 7,000 barrels per day (1,100 m^{3}/d) of condensate.

The fields are interconnected through two single-well tie-backs and transported to treatment facilities at Heimdal Gas Center, from which the processed gas is then exported to the United Kingdom through the Vesterled pipeline.

Total investment including the Vale satellite has been nearly 4 billion NOK which also included modifications on Heimdal, drilling operations, subsea templates and pipelines.

== See also ==
- Heimdal gas field
- Vale gas field
- Oseberg Transport System
- Grane oil field
- Oseberg oil field
- North Sea oil
- Economy of Norway
