= Heimdal gas field =

Offshore natural gas field in the North Sea

Heimdal
- Location within North Sea
- Country: Norway
- Location: North Sea
- Block: = 25/4
- Offshore/onshore: Offshore
- Coordinates: 59°34′27.30″N 2°13′22.60″E
- Operator: Equinor
- Partners: Equinor (39.44%); Centrica Resources (23.79%); Petoro (20%); TotalFinaElf Exploration Norge AS (16.75%)

Field history
- Discovery: 1972
- Start of production: 1986

Production
- Recoverable gas: 44.6×10^{9} m^{3} (1.58×10^{12} cu ft)
- Producing formations: Heimdal Jurassic

Heimdal (Norwegian: Heimdalfeltet) is an offshore natural gas field in the North Sea located 212 kilometres (132 mi) northwest of Stavanger, Norway. Heimdal serves as a connection hub for processing and distribution of natural gas from satellite fields.

The field was discovered in 1972. The depth of the sea at location is 120 metres (390 ft). The field was developed with an integrated drilling, production and accommodation facility with a steel jacket including a riser facility in 1999. The gas from the field is transported to Kårstø as well as to St. Fergus in Scotland. After construction of the Heimdal gas center, a new gas pipeline was connected to the existing one from Frigg gas field to St. Fergus. The gas is also transported to Grane oil field for gas injection. The condensate is sent by pipeline to Brae oilfield. Heimdal also gets gas from the Oseberg field center for further transportation through Statpipe system.

== Ownership ==
The Heimdal field is operated by Equinor. Partners are Equinor (39.44%), Centrica Resources (23.79%), Petoro (20%), and TotalFinaElf Exploration Norge AS (16.75%). Originally the operator was Norsk Hydro, but after transfer of Hydroäs oil assets to Equinor, Equinor took over operatorship. In summer of 2008, Marathon Oil sold its stake to Centrica for $416 million. Total investment has been 19 billion Norwegian krone.

== Reservoir ==
The Heimdal reservoir consists of sandstones from Heimdal Formation. The depth is approximately 2,100 metres (6,900 ft). Recoverable reserves stand at 44.6 billion cubic meter.

== Production ==
The overall rate of processed gas at Heimdal Gas Center constitutes about 15–20% of Norway's total gas export. Three smaller satellite fields Vale, Byggve and Skirne are also connected to Heimdal field via wells on the sea floor. Heimdal was discovered in 1972 and started production in 1986. As of January 2019, the field had produced 46 billion standard cubic meters of gas and 7 million standard cubic meters of oil. Veslefrikk came on stream in 1989 and produced over 400 million BOE.

== Decommissioning ==
Phased work to remove Heimdal and Veslefrikk A from the Norwegian North Sea shelf is planned to be completed sometime in 2025. Equinor has chosen Heerema Marine Contractors for removal, dismantling, and recycling of the topsides and jackets of the Heimdal riser platform, Heimdal main platform, and Veslefrikk A platform. The three contracts have been awarded on behalf of Gassco as operator of the Heimdal riser platform and on behalf of the partners of the Heimdal and Veslefrikk licenses.

The Veslefrikk partners plan to shut down the field permanently in the spring of 2022. Well plugging at the field started earlier this year. A decommissioning plan has been submitted to the authorities. The exact time for shutdown and start of removal will be decided by the Heimdal partners this summer.

== See also ==
- Oseberg Transport System
- Grane oil field
- Oseberg oil field
- North Sea oil
- Economy of Norway
