= Oseberg South =

Offshore oil field in the North Sea

- Location within North Sea
- Country: Norway
- Location: North Sea
- Block: 30/6, 30/9
- Offshore/onshore: offshore
- Coordinates: 60°23′24.62″N 2°47′49.06″E
- Operator: Statoil
- Partners: Statoil (49.3%); Petoro (33.6%); Total S.A. (10%); ExxonMobil (4.7%); ConocoPhillips (2.4%)

Field history
- Discovery: 1984
- Start of production: 2000

Production
- Recoverable oil: 346 million barrels (~4.72×10^{7} t)
- Recoverable gas: 16×10^{9} m^{3} (570×10^{9} cu ft)
- Producing formations: Jurassic sandstones

Oseberg South (Norwegian: Oseberg Sør) is an offshore oil field in the North Sea, located 115 kilometres (71 mi) from the coastline and 13 kilometres (8.1 mi) south of Oseberg oil field. Oseberg South was discovered in 1984. The field was developed with a fixed production, drilling and quarters (PDQ) facility and is operated by Statoil. The first stage phase processing is done at the Oseberg Øst platform. The second and third phase processing of oil is done at the Oseberg Field Center and it is then transported to Sture Terminal in Norway through the Oseberg Transport System. The development of Oseberg South was approved in 1977. Recent updates include approval of J structure which started producing in November 2006 and Oseberg Sør G Sentral which has been developed in 2009.

== Technical features ==
The sea depth at location is 100 m (330 ft). The platform at Oseberg South, which was built for drilling of 30 wells, includes a 125-metre (410 ft) tall steel jacket which supports a total topside dry weight of nearly 14,000 tonnes. It also includes a 100-bed capacity living quarters, first-stage processing facilities, power generation and utility systems and a high performance drilling package. The field produces up to 14,900 cubic metres (530,000 cu ft) of oil, 3.4 million cubic metres (120×10^{6} cu ft) of natural gas and 12,800 cubic metres (450,000 cu ft) of water per day. The field consists of ten accumulations within Jurassic sandstones, all in separate structures. The reservoirs lie at a depth of 2,200–2,800 metres (7,200–9,200 ft). Production lifetime is estimated at 20 years. It is believed to contain a total of 346 million barrels (55.0×10^{6} m^{3}) of recoverable oil and up to 16 billion cubic metres (570×10^{9} cu ft) of recoverable gas.

== See also ==
- Grane oil field
- Grane Oil Pipeline
- North Sea oil
- Oseberg East
- Oseberg Transport System
