= Oseberg East =

Offshore oil field in the North Sea

Oseberg Øst
- Location within North Sea
- Country: Norway
- Location: North Sea
- Block: 30/6
- Offshore/onshore: Offshore
- Coordinates: 60°41′20.60″N 2°57′11.09″E
- Operator: Statoil
- Partners: Statoil (49.3%); Petoro (33.6%); Total S.A. (14.7%); ConocoPhillips (2.4%)

Field history
- Discovery: 1981
- Start of development: 1996
- Start of production: 1999

Production
- Recoverable gas: 0.4×10^{9} m^{3} (14×10^{9} cu ft)

Oseberg Øst (English: Oseberg East) is an offshore oil field in the North Sea, located east of Oseberg Oil Field. The field was developed with a fixed production, drilling and quarters (PDQ) facility and is operated by Statoil. The first stage phase processing is done at the Oseberg Øst platform. The second and third phase processing of oil is done at the Oseberg Field Center and it is then transported to Sture terminal in Norway through the Oseberg Transport System.

== Technical features ==
The sea depth at location is 160 metres (520 ft). The trap consists of two fault blocks, separated by a sealing fault. The reservoir lies at a depth of 2,700–3,100 metres (8,900–10,200 ft). It is estimated that the recoverable reserves are up to 27.40 million cubic metres (968×10^{6} cu ft) of oil, 400 million cubic metres (14 billion cubic feet) of natural gas and 100,000 tonnes of NGL. Recovery is done through pressure maintenance utilizing both water injection and water alternating gas injection. Maximum daily output is 75,000 barrels per day (11,900 m^{3}/d).

== Updates ==
In the recent years, the facility has been modified and drilling of seven wells started. Partners developing the field invested NOK1.9 billion for upgrades and modifications in order to extract more oil from the field without the use of support vessels and increase the recovery rate from 28 to 35%. The upgrades included new drilling fluid module with appurtenant generator and transformer, new process control for zero discharges of drilling waste and pollutant liquids, 20 new cabins, 2 new lifeboats with room for 62 persons, new loading deck for drilling equipment and drilling chemicals.

== See also ==
- Oseberg Oil Field
- Oseberg Sør
- Sture terminal
- Oseberg Transport System
- Grane oil field
- Grane oil pipeline
- North Sea oil
