= List of crude oil products =

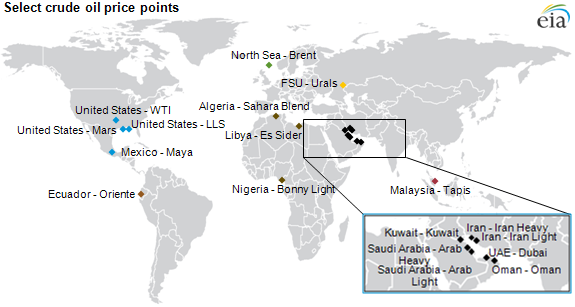
Crude oil map

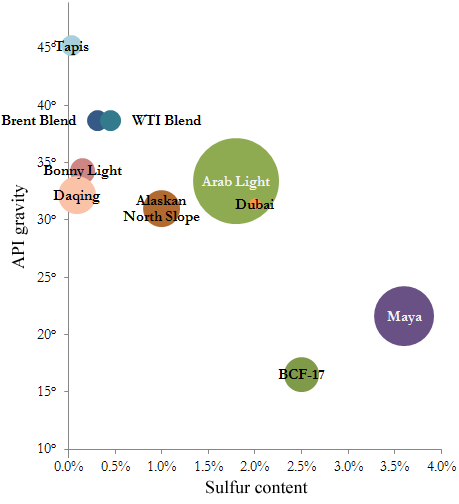
Main features of some qualities of crude oil

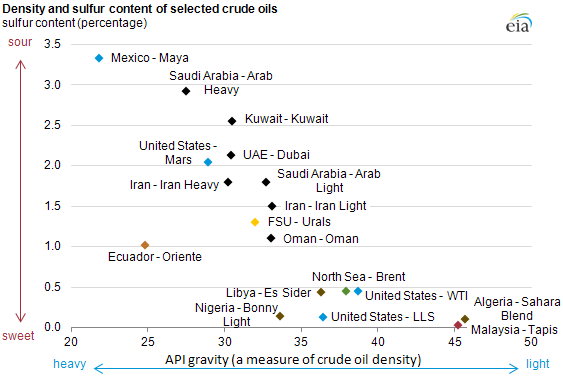
Density and sulfur content of crude oils

In the international petroleum industry, crude oil products are traded on various oil bourses based on established chemical profiles, delivery locations, and financial terms. The chemical profiles, or crude oil assays, specify important properties such as the oil's API gravity. The delivery locations are usually sea ports close to the oil fields from which the crude was obtained (and new fields are constantly being explored), and the pricing is usually quoted based on FOB (free on board, without consideration of final delivery costs).

== Benchmarks ==
The three most quoted oil products are North America's West Texas Intermediate crude (WTI), Brent Crude from the North Sea, and Dubai Crude from UAE, and their pricing is used as a barometer for the entire petroleum industry, although, in total, there are 46 key oil exporting countries. Brent Crude is typically priced at about $2 over the WTI Spot price, which is typically priced $5 to $6 above the EIA's Imported Refiner Acquisition Cost (IRAC) and OPEC Basket prices. WTI and Brent are quoted FOB specific locations, not FOB the oilfields. For WTI, the delivery point is Cushing, Oklahoma; for Brent, it is Sullom Voe, located in Shetland, an island archipelago north of mainland Scotland.

Although crude oil assays evaluate various chemical properties of the oil, the two most important properties that determine a crude's value are its density (measured as API specific gravity) and its sulphur content (measured per mass). Crude oil is considered "heavy" if it has long hydrocarbon chains, or "light" if it has short hydrocarbon chains: an API gravity of 34 or higher is "light", between 31 and 33 is "medium", and 30 or below is "heavy". Crude is considered "sweet" if it is low in sulphur content (< 0.5%/weight), or "sour" if high (> 1.0%/weight). Generally, the higher the API gravity (the "lighter" it is), the more valuable the crude.

== List of crude oil products ==
Product name	API gravity	Sulphur content (as % of mass)	Operating company	Location of field	Port of sale
Abu Bukhoosh	31.6°	2.0%	Total Abu Al Bukhoosh	Dubai	Abu Al-Bukhoosh
Agbami	47.5°	0.044%	Chevron	Nigeria	offshore
Undisclosed	Undisclosed	Undisclosed	Genel Energy/CPC Taiwan	Somaliland	Central Somaliland oil fields
Aktobe	41.6°	0.73%		Kazakhstan	Novorossiysk
Al Shaheen	26.51°	2.49%	North Oil Company (Qatar)	Qatar	Mesaieed
Al-Jurf	30.0°	1.90%		Libya	Farwah FPSO
Alaska North Slope	31.9°	0.93%		United States	Alaska Marine Terminal
Alba (Equatorial Guinea)	53.0°	0.02%		Equatorial Guinea	Punta Europa
Alba (U.K.)	19.4°	1.24%	Chevron	United Kingdom	offshore
Albian Heavy (Athabasca)	19.6°	2.10%		Canada	
Algerian Condensate	68.7°	0.001%	Sonatrach, BP and Statoil	Algeria	Béjaïa
Amenam Blend	38.2°	0.12%		Nigeria	
Amenam/Mars Blend	33.5°	0.94%		Nigeria	
Ameriven-Hamaca	26°	1.55%		Venezuela	Puerto José
Amna	36°	0.17%		Libya	
Anasuria			Shell	United Kingdom	FPSO Anasuria
Antan Blend	26.4°	0.27%		Nigeria	Knock Adoon FPSO/Antan Terminal
Arab Extra Light	39.4°	1.09%		Saudi Arabia	
Arab Heavy	27.7°	2.87%		Saudi Arabia	
Arab Light	32.8°	1.97%		Saudi Arabia	
Arab Light / Seg 17 Blend	32.4°	2.19%		United States	
Arab Medium	30.2°	2.59%		Saudi Arabia	
Arab Super Light	50.1°	0.09%		Saudi Arabia	
Arab Super Light Ardjuna	50.6°	0.04%			
Arun Condensate					
Åsgard Blend	50.5°	0.07%	Statoil	Norway	offshore
Attaka	42.3°	0.09%		Indonesia	
Azadegan				Iran	
Azeri BTC	36.1°	0.14%	BP SOCAR	Azerbaijan	Ceyhan, Turkey
Azeri Light	34.8°	0.15%	BP SOCAR	Azerbaijan	Supsa, Georgia
BCF-17	16.5°	2.53%		Venezuela	La Salina
Bạch Hổ	33.8°	0.08%		Vietnam	
Bachaquero 17	17°	2.4%		Venezuela	
Bachaquero 24	24°			Venezuela	
Balder	30.1°	0.48%		Norway	Balder FPSO
Baobab	23°	0.39-0.46%		Ivory Coast	Baobab FPSO
Barrow	36.1°	0.05%	Santos	Australia	Barrow Island
Basrah Light	30.5°	2.90%		Iraq	
Basrah Medium	27.9°	3.00%		Iraq	
Basrah Light/Mesa 30 Blend (35/65)	30.5°	1.63%		Iraq/United States	
Bayou Choctaw Sour	32.2°	1.43%		United States	
Bayou Choctaw Sweet	36.0°	0.36%		United States	
Bayu Undan	55.9°	0.07%		Australia/East Timor	Liberdade FSO
Belanak	47.8°	0.02%		Indonesia	Belanak FPSO
Belayim Blend	27.5°	2.40%		Egypt	Wadi Feiran
Belida	45.1°	0.02%		Indonesia	
Benchamas	42.4°		Chevron Offshore (Thailand) Ltd	Thailand	
Beryl	37.5°	0.42%		United Kingdom	Beryl
Bintulu Condensate	69.3°	0.03%		Malaysia	Bintulu
Usan	29.9°	0.26%		Nigeria	
Bonga	29.1°	0.26%		Nigeria	Bonga FPSO
Bonito Sour	35.5°	0.99%		United States	St. James, Louisiana
Bonny Light	33.4°	0.16%		Nigeria	
Bontang Condensate				Indonesia	
Boscan	10.1°	5.70%		Venezuela	Bajo Grande
Bouri	26.3°	1.91%		Libya	Bouri
Bow River	24.7°	2.10%		Canada	
Brass River	35.6°	0.13%	Nigerian Agip Oil Company	Nigeria	
Brega	39.8°	0.20%		Libya	Brega
Brent Blend	38.3°	0.37%	Shell UK Oil Company	United Kingdom, Norway	Hound point, UK or Sture terminal, Norway
Brunei Light	39.0°	0.066%		Brunei	
CPC Blend	45.3°	0.56%	Chevron	Kazakhstan	Novorossiysk
Cabinda	32.4°	0.13%		Angola	
Canadian Par	40°			Canada	
Canadon Seco	25.7°	0.20%		Argentina	Caleta Olivia
Cano Limon	30°	0.45%		Colombia	Covenas
Captain	19.2°	0.70%		United Kingdom	Captain FPSO
Ceiba	29.9°	0.57%		Equatorial Guinea	Sendje Ceiba FPSO
Cepu	32°	0.15%		Indonesia	Cepu FSO
Cerro Negro	16°	3.34%		Venezuela	Puerto José
Champion	28.7°	0.13%		Brunei	Seria
Chim Sao	40.1°	0.03%	PV Oil	Vietnam	Chim Sao Marine Terminal
Chinguetti	28.3°	0.49%		Mauritania	Berge Helene FPSO
Cinta	31.1°	0.09%		Indonesia	Cinta
Clair	23.7°	0.44%		United Kingdom	Sullom Voe
Cold Lake	21.2°	3.70%		Canada	Westridge Marine Terminal
Cooper	45.2°	0.03%	Santos	Australia	Port Bonython
Cossack	47.7°	0.05%		Australia	Cossack Pioneer FPSO
Cusiana	44°	0.14%		Colombia	
DUC	33.6°	0.26%		Denmark	Fredericia
Dalia	23.6°	0.51%	Total S.A.	Angola	offshore
Daqing	32.2°	0.11%		China	Dairen (Dalian)
Dar Blend	26.42°	0.12%		Sudan	Al-Khayr
Djeno	27.0°	0.47%		Congo	Djeno
Doba	21.1°	0.10%		Chad	Kome Kribi 1 FSO
Doroud	34°	2.5%		Iran	Kharg Island
Draugen	39.9°	0.15%	Shell Oil Company	Norway	offshore
Dubai	31°	2.0%			
Dukhan	41.1°	1.22%		Qatar	Umm Said
Dulang	37.6°	0.05%		Malaysia	Dulang FSO
Duri	20.8°	0.20%		Indonesia	Dumai
EA Crude	35.1°	0.08%		Nigeria	
East MS Mix	30.9°	2.10%		United States	
Ekofisk Blend (Norway)	37.2°	0.23%		Norway	
Ekofisk Blend	37.5°	0.23%	ConocoPhillips	United Kingdom	Teesside
El Sharara	43.1°	0.07%		Libya	Zawiya terminal
Enfield	21.7°	0.13%		Australia	Nganhurra FPSO
Erha	31.8°	0.21%		Nigeria	Erha FPSO
Sidra	37.0°	0.39%	Waha Oil Company	Libya	Sidra
Escalante	24.1°	0.19%		Argentina	Comodoro Rivadavia
Escravos	34.2°	0.17%		Nigeria	
ESPO blend	34.8°	0.62%		Russia	Koźmino
Eugene Island	34.3°	1.18%		United States	St. James, Louisiana
Fateh	30.4°	2.13%	Dubai Petroleum	Dubai	Fateh
Fife				United States	
Flotta	35.4°	1.22%		United Kingdom	Flotta
Foinaven	26.6°	0.40%		United Kingdom	
Forcados (to Europe)	30.8°	0.16%		Nigeria	
Foroozan Blend	29.7°	2.34%		Iran	Kharg Island
Forties Blend	40.3°	0.56%	BP	United Kingdom	Hound Point
Fulmar			Shell	United Kingdom	
Furrial	30.0°	1.06%		Venezuela	
Galeota Mix	37.8°	0.19%		Trinidad	
Gippsland	63.6°	0.03%	ExxonMobil	Australia	Long Island Point
Girassol	29.9°	0.32%	Total S.A.	Angola	offshore
Glitne	32.9°	0.50%	Statoil	Norway	offshore
Grane	18.7°	0.83%	Statoil	Norway	Sture terminal
Gryphon	22.68°	0.40%		United Kingdom	
Gullfaks Blend	37.5°	0.22%	Statoil	Norway	offshore
Handil Mix	43.9°	0.05%		Indonesia	Senipah
Hanze				Netherlands	
Harding	20.7°	0.59%		United Kingdom	Cromarty Firth
Heavy Hardisty	22°	3.36%		Canada	
Heavy Louisiana Sweet	32.9°	0.35%		United States	Empire, Louisiana
Heidrun	25.0°	0.52%	Statoil	Norway	Mongstad terminal
Hibernia	34.4°	0.41%		Canada	
Hungo Blend	29.1°	0.61%	ExxonMobil	Angola	Kizomba A FPSO offshore
Iran Heavy	30.2°	1.77%		Iran	Kharg Island
Iran Light	33.1°	1.50%		Iran	Kharg Island
Isthmus	33.4°	1.25%		Mexico	Dos Bocas, Salina Cruz
Jasmine					
Jotun					
Karachaganak Condensate	44.7°	0.81%		Kazakhstan	Novorossiysk, Odesa
Kashagan	42-48°	0.80%		Kazakhstan	Ceyhan
Khafji	28.5°	2.85%		Saudi Arabian Neutral Zone	Ras al-Khafji
Kikeh	34.9°	0.11%		Malaysia	Kikeh FPSO
Kirkuk (Netback Price at U.S. Gulf)	33.9°	2.26%		Iraq	
Kissanje Blend	29.8°	0.38%	ExxonMobil	Angola	Kizomba B FPSO offshore
Kitina	36.4°	0.11%		Congo	
Kittiwake					
Kole	32.1°	0.33%		Cameroon	Kole
Kuito	19.0°	0.68%		Angola	Kuito FPSO
Kumkol	41.2°	0.11%		Kazakhstan	Yuzhnaya Ozereevka, Batumi
Kutubu Blend	46.6°	0.04%	Oil Search	Papua New Guinea	Kumul
Kuwait Blend	30.2°	2.72%	Kuwait Oil Company	Kuwait	
Labuan	32.0°	0.09%		Malaysia	Labuan
Laguna	10.9°	5.4%	Petróleos de Venezuela S.A.	Venezuela	Puerto Miranda
Laminaria					
LA Mississippi Sweet	40.7°	0.34%		United States	
Lavan Blend	34.2°	1.93%		Iran	Lavan Island
Light Louisiana Sweet	35.6°	0.37%		United States	St. James, Louisiana
Lion Crude	39.6°	0.18%		Ivory Coast	
Liuhua					
Liverpool Bay°	45°	0.21%		United Kingdom	Liverpool Bay Platform
Lloyd Blend	20.9°	3.50%		Canada	
Lower Zakum	39.8°	1.02%	ADNOC Offshore	Abu Dhabi	Das Island
Loreto	18.1°	1.3%	Pluspetrol	Peru	Bayovar – Piura
Lufeng	33.3°	0.06%	Statoil	China	offshore
MacCulloch					
Mandji	30°			Gabon	
Marib Light (Alif)	48.9°	0.07%	BP	Yemen	
Marlim	19.6°	0.67%	Petrobras	Brazil	Campos Basin
Mars Blend	30.3°	1.91%		United States	LOOP Clovelly Hub, Louisiana
Mars/Mesa Blend (40/60)	30.1°	1.65%		Loop	
Mars/Urals Blend (50/50)	31.1°	1.57%		United States	LOOP Clovelly Hub, Louisiana
Masila	31.4°	0.54%		Yemen	Ash Shihr
Maureen	35.3°	1.3%		United Kingdom	
Maya	21.8°	3.33%		Mexico	Cayo Arcas, Salina Cruz
Mayna	21.5°	0.5%	Pluspetrol	Peru	Bayovar – Piura
Medanito	34.9°	0.48%		Argentina	Puerto Rosales
Mediterranean Sidi Kerir (Heavy)	30°			Iran	
Mediterranean Sidi Kerir (Light)	34°			Iran	
Mesa 30	29.4°	1.12%		Venezuela	
Minas	35.3°	0.09%		Indonesia	Dumai
Miri	32.3°	0.08%		Malaysia	Miri
Mixed Blend Sweet	41.0°	0.42%		Canada	Edmonton
Mondo	28.8°	0.44%	ExxonMobil	Angola	Mondo FPSO offshore
Murban	40.2°	0.79%	ADNOC Onshore	Abu Dhabi	Jebel Dhanna
Mutineer Exeter	43.4°	0.03%	Santos	Australia	Modec Venture 11 FPSO
Naphtha Koch	57.8°	0.11%		United States	
N'kossa	41.0°	0.04%		Congo	N'Kossa
NFC II	57.95°	0.23%		Qatar	Ras Laffan
Northwest Shelf Condensate	61.2°	0.01%		Australia	Withnell Bay
Nang Nuang					
Nanhai Light	40.1°	0.06%		China	Nan Hai Fa Xian FPSO
Napo	19°	2%		Ecuador	Esmeraldas
Nemba	40.9°	0.18%		Angola	
New Zafiro Blend	29.5°	0.26%		Equatorial Guinea	Serpentina FPSO
Nile Blend	33.9°	0.06%		Sudan	Port Sudan
Njord	46.6°	0.05%	Statoil	Norway	offshore
Norne	30.8°	0.22%	Statoil	Norway	offshore
Nowruz/Soroush	18-19°	3.4-3.5%		Iran	Kharg Island
Odudu	30.5°	0.15%		Nigeria	
Oguendjo	27.3°	1.50%		Gabon	
Okono	41.9°	0.06%		Nigeria	
Olmeca	37.3°	0.84%		Mexico	
Oman Blend	34°	2.00%		Oman	
Oriente	24.1°	1.51%		Ecuador	
Ormen Lange condensate	52.3°	0.007%	Statoil	Norway	Nyhamna
Oseberg Blend	37.8°	0.27%	Statoil	Norway	Sture terminal
Ösgard Blend					
Oso Condensate	45.7°	0.06%		Nigeria	
Palanca/Soyo Blend	37.8°	0.16%		Angola	
Panyu	28-32°	<0.25%		China	Panyu FPSO
Peng Lai	21.8°	0.29%		China	Peng Lai FPSO
Pennington	35°	0.08%		Nigeria	Pennington Terminal
Peregrino	13.4°	1.8%		Brazil	
Petrozuata Heavy	19.5°	2.69%	PDVSA, Conoco	Venezuela	
Pierce					
Plutonio	32.6º	0.39%	BP	Angola	
Port Hudson	45.0°	0.05%		United States	
Poseidon Streams	29.6°	1.97%	BP	United States	Houma
Premium Albian	35.5°	0.04%		Canada	
Qatar Marine	35.8°	1.47%		Qatar	Halul Island
Qua Iboe	36.3°	0.14%		Nigeria	
Rabi Light	37.7°	0.15%		Gabon	
Rang Dong	37.7°	0.05%		Vietnam	Rang Dong FPSO
Rincon	35.8°	0.39%		Argentina	San Vincente, Chile
Rio Grande do Norte	29.5°	0.33%	Petrobras	Brazil	
Ross					
Sahara Blend	45°	0.09%	Sonatrach	Algeria	
Santa Barbara	39.5°	0.49%		Venezuela	
Sarir	37.6°	0.16%		Libya	Marsa El Hariga
Saudi Arabia Heavy	27°			Saudi Arabia	
Saudi Arabia Light	34°			Saudi Arabia	
Saudi Arabia Medium	31°			Saudi Arabia	
Saxi Batuque Blend	32.8°	0.32%	ExxonMobil	Angola	Saxi Batuque FPSO offshore
Schiehallion Blend	25.5°	0.47%	BP	United Kingdom	Sullom Voe
Senipah	51.9°	0.03%		Indonesia	Senipah
Seria Light	36.2°	0.08%		Brunei	
Seria Light Export					
Shah Deniz Condensate	47°	0.03%	BP	Azerbaijan	Ceyhan, Turkey
Shengli	24.2°	0.84%		China	Qingdao
Siberian Light	35.1°	0.57%		Russia	Tuapse
Sincor	30-32°	0.13%		Venezuela	Puerto José
Siri	38.1°	0.22%		Denmark	Siri
Sirri	33.4°	1.81%		Iran	Sirri Island
Sirtica	42.2°	0.40%		Libya	Brega
Sleipner Condensate	62.0°	0.02%	Statoil	Norway	Kårstø
Snorre					
Snøhvit Condensate	60.1°	0.019%	Statoil	Norway	Melkøya
Sokol (Sakhalin I)	37.9°	0.23%		Russia	DeKastri
Souedieh	24.1°	3.90%		Syria	Banias, Tartous
South Arne	37.71°	0.21%		Denmark	
Southern Green Canyon	30.4°	2.24%		United States	Port Arthur, Texas and Texas City, Texas
South Louisiana Sweet	35.9°	0.33%		United States	
Stag	18.5°	0.14%	Apache	Australia	Stag Marine Facility
Statfjord	39.1°	0.22%	Statoil	Norway	offshore
Su Tu Den (Black Lion)	36°	0.04%	PV Oil	Vietnam	Su Tu Den Terminal
Suez Blend	30.8°	1.49%		Egypt	Ras Shukheir
Syncrude Sweet Blend	30.5-33.6°	0.07-0.13%		Canada	
Syrian Light	37.7°	0.74%		Syria	Banias, Tartous
Tapis Blend	45.2°	0.03%		Malaysia	Tapis
Thăng Long	36.8°	0.09%		Vietnam	
Tempa Rossa					
Tengiz	46.4°	0.51%	Chevron	Kazakhstan	Odesa, Batumi, Kulevi, Taman
Terra Nova	33.2	0.48%		Canada	Whiffen Head
Thamama Condensate	58.4°	0.11%	ADNOC Onshore	Abu Dhabi	Jebel Dhanna
Tia Juana Heavy	11°	2.66%		Venezuela	Punta Cardon
Tia Juana Light	31.9°	1.18%		Venezuela	Las Salinas
Triton	37.5°	0.32%		United Kingdom	Triton FPSO
Troll Blend	35.8°	0.21%	Statoil	Norway	Mongstad terminal
Turkmen Blend	33.0°	0.15-0.29%		Turkmenistan	Aladzha, Okarem
Ukpokiti	41.7°	0.08%	Conoco Phillips	Nigeria	Trinity Spirit FPSO
Umm Shaif	36.5°	1.39%	ADNOC Offshore	Abu Dhabi	Das Island
Upper Zakum	32.9°	1.78%	ADNOC Offshore	Abu Dhabi	Zirku Island
Urals (to Mediterranean)	31.7°	1.35%		Russia / C.I.S.	
Urucu	42.1°	0.09%	Petrobras	Brazil	Urucu
Varg	37.9°	0.23%	Talisman	Norway	offshore
Vasconia	24.5°	0.95%		Colombia	
Vityaz (Sakhalin II)	34.6°	0.22%		Russia	Molikpaq-Prigorodnoye
Volve	27.9°	1.8%	Statoil	Norway	offshore
Wafra	24.5°	3.80%		Saudi Arabian Neutral Zone	Mina Saud
West Seno	38°	0.12%		Indonesia	Santan
West Texas Intermediate	39.6°	0.24%		United States	Cushing, Oklahoma
West Texas Sour	31.7°	1.28%		United States	Midland, Texas
Western Canadian Select	20.3°	3.43%		Canada	Hardisty
White Rose	29.8°	0.32%		Canada	SeaRose FPSO
Widuri	33.2°	0.07%		Indonesia	Widuri
Williams Sugarland Blend	40.9°	0.20%		United States	
Wytch Farm			Perenco	United Kingdom	Hamble
Xikomba	34.7°	0.39%	ExxonMobil	Angola	offshore
Yoho Crude	39.3°	0.08%		Nigeria	
Zakum	40.2°	1.01%		Abu Dhabi	Das Island
Zarzaitine	42.8°	0.06%		Algeria	La Skhirra, Tunisia
Mesa 30	30°	0.13%	Total S.A.	Venezuela	Jose terminal
Zuwetina	41.5°	0.31%		Libya	Zuwetina, Libya

== Sources ==
- U.S. Energy Information Administration: World Crude Oil Prices
- BP Crude Grades
- Intertek: Crude Oil Grades and Types
- MeGlobalOil: Carriage of Heavy Grade Oil
- Statoil.com: Crude oil assays
- EnergyIntel.com: The Crude Oils and their Key Characteristics
- Capline system crude oil properties and quality indicators
