= Vale gas field =

Offshore gas field in the North Sea

- Location within North Sea
- Country: Norway
- Region: North Sea
- Offshore/onshore: offshore
- Coordinates: 59°42′22.43″N 2°18′37.83″E
- Operator: Sval Energi
- Partners: Sval Energi; LOTOS; PGNiG

Field history
- Start of production: 31 May 2002

Production
- Estimated gas in place: 2.5×10^{9} m^{3} (88×10^{9} cu ft)

Vale (Norwegian: Valefeltet) is an offshore gas field in the North Sea located 16 kilometres (9.9 mi) north of the Heimdal gas field. The depth of the water in the field area is 115 metres (377 ft). Vale is considered a satellite to Heimdal field and is connected to it by a pipeline. Estimated reserves at Vale stand at 2.5 billion cubic metres (88 billion cubic feet) of natural gas and 21 million barrels (3,300,000 m^{3}) of gas condensate. Vale gas field is expected to produce 1.6 million cubic metres per day (57 million cubic feet per day) of natural gas and 2,600 barrels per day (410 m^{3}/d) of condensate.

== History ==
Production started on 31 May 2002, according to the Plan for Development and Operation approved by Norway in the spring of 2001. Total investment has been 800 million NOK which also included modifications on Heimdal, drilling operations, subsea templates and pipelines.

== Ownership ==
The Vale field is operated by Sval Energi (50%) with LOTOS holding 25.757% and PGNiG holding 24.243% of the stake.

The field was originally operated by Norsk Hydro. In 2007, the operations were transferred to Statoil as a result of the merger between Statoil and Hydro Oil & Gas. In 2012, Centrica acquired Statoil's stake and took over operatorship; operatorship passed to Sval Energi upon their acquisition of Centrica's subsidiary, Spirit Energy's Norwegian assets in 2022.

== See also ==
- Heimdal gas field
- Oseberg Transport System
- Grane oil field
- Oseberg oil field
- North Sea oil
- Economy of Norway
