= Volvo Deal =

Norway-Sweden industrial cooperation plan

The Volvo Deal was a plan for industrial cooperation between Norway and Sweden whereby Norway would get 40% of the shares of the Volvo car manufacturing concern, while Volvo would get control over oil resources on the Norwegian continental shelf. Out of the three unprospected North Sea areas that Sweden was offered in exchange only one turned out to have gas, and none of them had oil. The plan was rejected in January 1979 by Volvo's shareholders, who believed that Volvo was being sold too cheaply and that the Norwegian oil industry was not worth so much. Parts of the Norwegian Storting (parliament) were also skeptical. This was an important moment in Norwegian and Swedish economic history. Norway's oil resources later gave rise to significant wealth, some of which was spent while some was saved in the country's sovereign wealth fund. In 2018, the fund reached US$1 trillion. Meanwhile, Volvo was bought by the Chinese company Geely in 2010.
