= State budget of Norway =

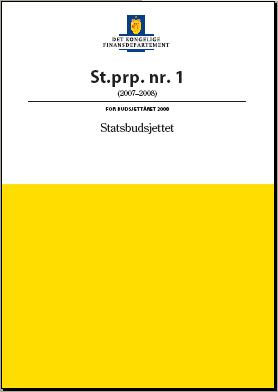
The yellow book, the publication of the state budget.

The State budget of Norway (Norwegian: Statsbudsjettet) is a government budget passed by the Norwegian legislature, Stortinget, each year. It accumulates all income and expenses for the Government of Norway. The document defines the taxes to be collected, and what expenses will be accomplished.

The budget follows a fiscal year of January 1 to December 31. The proposition for the budget is made by the Ministry of Finance in the first week of October. This proposition is named Storting Proposition no. 1 or Yellow Book and is the governments suggestion for a budget. It is then considered by the Standing Committee of Finance.

If there is a majority government, the budget is normally passed without much change. In case of a minority government, which have been more the rule than the exception since the 1970s, the government party(s) must negotiate with enough opposition parties to pass it in the legislature. The responsibility to audit the accounts is at the Office of the Auditor General of Norway.

== State budget 2007 ==
All sums in NOK million

=== Main figures ===
Expenses

- Operating costs: 109,355
- Investments: 40,334
- Transfers: 927,708
- Lending and instalment: 2
- Total costs: 1,202,683

Income

- Operating income: 132,970
- from investments: 16,179
- Taxes and transfers: 928,248
- Paybacks: 59,682
- Total income:1,137,079

=== Specifications ===
- Operating costs
  - Military: 20,754
  - State roads: 7,110
  - Railway: 3,282
  - Police and prosecution: 9,017
  - Courts: 1,889
  - Prisons: 2,291
  - Labour and welfare management: 7,616
  - Tax administration: 4,833
  - Pensions to state employees: 8,499
  - Ministries: 5,520
  - State wage negotiations: 9,720
  - Commercial activity: -371
  - Other costs: 29,194
  - Subtotal: 109,355
- Investment costs
  - State petroleum activity: 18,300
  - Defence: 9,257
  - State roads: 5,408
  - Buildings: 1,595
  - Other buildings: 1,500
  - Railway: 2,220
  - Other investments: 2 055
  - Subtotal: 40,334
- Transfers
  - Pension Fund: 364,893
  - Other state budgets: 33,611
  - Municipalities: 101,127
  - Pensions: 245,239
  - Other transfers: 182,838
  - Subtotal: 927,708
- Operating income
  - From SDFI: 122,300
  - Other: 10,670
  - Subtotal: 132,970
- Transfer
  - Dividend: 57,042
