= Puerto Miranda =

- Location within Venezuela
- Coordinates: 10°45′10.8″N 71°32′42″W
- Country: Venezuela
- State: Zulia

Puerto Miranda is an oil port situated on the east side of Lake Maracaibo in Venezuela opposite the city of Maracaibo and is operated by the Venezuelan State Oil Company (PDVSA PETROLEO, S.A.) It is the largest crude oil export port in South America.

== History ==
Shell, together with the Esso and Gulf subsidiaries Creole and Mene Grande, decided to construct a deepwater port inside Lake Maracaibo from which to export their crude oils, together with a tank farm to store crude oils that were later sent to the refineries in Amuay and Cardon on the Paraguaná peninsula. Construction of the port started at the end of the 1950s and was completed in 1961.

== Facilities ==
Puerto Miranda has two jetties, each long enough to take two tankers, so that four tankers can be serviced at one time. Jetty No. 2 (North) provides two berths, Berth No. 1 and No. 2; Jetty No. 3 (South) provides Berths No. 5 and 6. All cargo is loaded through 12-inch-diameter (300 mm) chiksans at a maximum rate of about 5,500 Tonnes per hour. Products supplied are

- Fuel Oil No. 2 and No. 6

and the following crude oils:

- Laguna
- Tia Juana Heavy
- Bachaquero
- Lagunillas
- Cabimas
- Menemota
- Lagomar
- Lagocinco
- Lagotreco

For a list of crude oil types see the List of crude oil products

Berth Restrictions

Berth	DRAFT	LOA	BEAM	DISPLACEMENT	Summer DWT
1	12.04 m	277.4 m	30.48 m	90,000 T	115,000 T
2	11.43 m	277.4 m	30.48 m	90,000 T	115,000 T
5	12.04 m	277.4 m	41.15 m	90,000 T	115,000 T
6	11.43 m	277.4 m	41.15 m	90,000 T	115,000 T

The maximum sailing draft for navigating the main lake channel is 11.53 metres.
