= Sture Terminal =

- Interactive map of Sture Terminal

Location
- Country: Norway
- Location: Øygarden
- Coordinates: 60.621389°N 4.837778°E

Details
- Opened: December 1, 1988
- Operated by: Petoro AS
- Owned by: Norway
- Type of Harbor: Oil and Gas Terminal

Statistics
- Annual cargo tonnage: 6.3 million barrels (1.00×10^{6} m^{3})

Sture Terminal (Norwegian: Stureterminalen) is an oil terminal at Stura in Øygarden Municipality, 50 km (31 mi) northwest of the city of Bergen, Norway. The terminal, which is located on Alvøy island, receives oil and condensate (light oil) from Oseberg, Veslefrikk, Brage, Oseberg Sør, Oseberg Øst, Tune and Huldra fields through 115 km (71 mi) Oseberg Transport System (OTS) and oil from Grane oil field through 212 km (132 mi) Grane oil pipeline.

== History ==
The Sture terminal began its operations on 1 December 1988. On 30 November 1988 the first oil from the Oseberg field reached the Sture terminal. It had travelled along a 115-kilometre (71 mi) pipeline for 4 days at depths as low as 360 metres (1,180 ft) with a speed of 1 kilometre per hour (0.62 mph). The terminal celebrated its 20-year anniversary in 2008 The Norwegian Ministry of Petroleum and Energy approved an upgrade to the facility in March 1998. As per the upgrade, a fractionation plant would process unstabilized crude oil from Oseberg into stabilized oil and an LPG blend. The plant became operational in December 1999 and the LPG blend produced in the plant is exported by ship or delivered through the Vestprosess pipeline between Kollsnes, Stura, Mongstad.

== Ownership ==
The Sture terminal has the same ownership shares as in Oseberg Transport System (OTS):

Company	Share
Petoro AS	48.38%
Norsk Hydro	22.24%
Statoil ASA	14.0%
TotalEnergies Exploration Norge AS	8.65%
Mobil Development Norway	4.33%
Norske Conoco A/S	2.4%

The exception is the LPG export facilities which are a property of Norsk Hydro (the refrigerated LPG storage and transfer system to ships) and Vestprosess DA (export facility to Vestprosess).

== Technical features ==
The terminal has two jetties which allows to load up to 300,000 tonnes (300,000 long tons; 330,000 short tons) onto oil tankers. It also has five rock caverns for crude oil storage with a total capacity of 6.3 million barrels. Additionally, there is a 60,000-cubic-metre (78,000 yd^{3}) rock cavern for storage of LPG and a 200,000-cubic-metre (260,000 yd^{3}) ballast water cavern in the terminal. A separate unit for recovering of volatile organic compounds (VOC), environmentally important during loading of tankers is also in operation. Nearly 250-260 crude oil and LPG carriers go through Sture terminal each year

== Production ==
Nearly 25% of Norway's oil production passes through Sture terminal. In 2009, after StatoilHydro shut down six oil and gas fields along with the Sture terminal, the Norwegian Petroleum Directorate had the following production 2009 expectations for fields exporting oil through Sture terminal:

Field name	bbl/day
Oseberg	75,000
Grane	148,000
Huldra	3,000
Veslefrikk	13,000

== See also ==
- Oseberg Transport System
- North Sea oil
- Economy of Norway
- Oseberg oil field
- Grane oil field
