= Brage oil field =

Oil field located in Norway

Brage
- Location within North Sea
- Country: Norway
- Location/blocks: 30/6, 31/4, 31/7
- Offshore/onshore: Offshore
- Coordinates: 60.58°N 3.02°E
- Operator: OKEA
- Partners: OKEA ASA (35.20%), Lime Petroleum AS (33.84%), DNO Norge AS (14.26%), Petrolia NOCO AS (12.26%), M Vest Energy AS (4.44%)

Field history
- Discovery: 1980
- Start of production: 1993
- Peak of production: 1998
- Abandonment: 2013

Production
- Current production of oil: 25,000 barrels per day (~1.2×10^{6} t/a)
- Estimated oil in place: 25 million barrels (~3.4×10^{6} t)
- Producing formations: Statfjord, Fensfjord

Brage (Norwegian: Bragefeltet) is an offshore oil field in the North Sea located 120 km (75 mi) northwest of the city of Bergen on the western coast of Norway and 13 km (8.1 mi) east of Oseberg Field Center. The field also contains gas. The water depth at the location is 140 metres (460 ft). The field was developed with a fixed integrated production, drilling and accommodation facility The oil from the field is pumped through a pipeline to Oseberg A facility from where it is transported to Sture terminal via Oseberg Transport System. The gas from the field is exported through Statpipe system to Kårstø. It is estimated that Brage may hold up to 20,000,000 barrels (3,200,000 m^{3}) to 25,000,000 barrels (4,000,000 m^{3}) of recoverable oil.

== Ownership ==
The Brage field is operated by OKEA ASA. OKEA holds 35.20%, Lime Petroleum AS – 33.8%, DNO Norge AS – 14.20%, Petrolia NOCO AS – 12.2%, M Vest Energy AS – 4.44%.

== Production ==
Brage oil field produced up to 120,000 barrels per day (19,000 m^{3}/d) when it reached its peak production in 1998 and is currently producing 25,000 barrels per day (4,000 m^{3}/d). New wells were drilled in 2007 and the operator plans on drilling more wells in the near future.

== See also ==
- Sture terminal
- Oseberg Transport System
- Oseberg oil field
- North Sea oil
- Economy of Norway
