= Puerto José =

- Interactive map of Puerto José

Location
- Country: Venezuela
- Location: Bahía de Barcelona, Barcelona, Anzoátegui
- Coordinates: 10°06′N 64°52′W

Puerto José is a sea port in northeastern Venezuela, on the Caribbean Sea, in the state of Anzoátegui, about 10 km west of Barcelona. It is home to an important oil tanker loading complex, the Complejo criogenico de Oriente José, created in 1985 and now more often referred to by its original name, the Cryogenic Complex of Oriente, San Joaquin Plant. The complex is used to load several of Venezuela's petroleum products onto oil tankers, including Ameriven-Hamaca, Cerro Negro, Sincor, and Zuata Sweet.

The José industrial zone comprises one part of the Eastern Cryogenic Complex (ACCRO), which includes refineries, petrochemical plants, and gas compression plants.

The complex consists of several separate terminals on the South side of Bahía de Barcelona. The port exports refined petroleum products, crude oil and containers. About 180 ships with a total of 30 million tons deadweight (tdwt) are using the port every year.

The deepest and longest berth is the Petroterminal José (TAECJ Terminal). Ships up to 300,000 tdwt can berth at the Bitor Single Point Mooring buoy (SPM, 10°09'N / 64°50'W).

The complex consists further of a cryogenic jetty terminal (10°05.08'N / 64°51.5'W), two petrochemical docks (Petrozuata and SINCOR), an offshore platform terminal, and two SPM's. The offshore terminal and the SPM are connected to the shore by submarine pipelines.

In 2023, a contract is signed with semi-public Iranian enterprise Petropars to upgrade José oil terminal including renovation of storage tanks, overhaul of pumping stations and boosting loading capacity. Jose Terminal Upgrade

== Environmental issues ==
The port of José and its refinery sit adjacent to Mochima National Park. This proximity to a national park may prove to be of significant consequence if any oil spills were to arise.

== See also ==
- List of crude oil products
