= Repressuring =

Repressuring is a common method of increasing the pressure inside of a crude oil well in order to boost the output of the well. Pumping crude oil from a reservoir causes its pressure to drop, which further reduces pumpability. Returning the natural gas or other inert gases to the oil well increases the pumpability of the crude present inside the well by decreasing its viscosity and density. In one instance, slower rate of oil production and recycling of natural gas at 9.6 MPa enabled a net recovery of 70% of the oil originally present.

Although recovery can be increased even by repressuring with air, it is rarely used because it causes an inferior quality of product. Carbon dioxide or natural gas itself is used instead so as to not only increase the recovery from the oil well but also to maintain the high quality of the product.
