= Gas reinjection =

Reinjection of natural gas into an underground reservoir

Gas reinjection is the reinjection of natural gas into an underground reservoir, typically one already containing both natural gas and crude oil, in order to increase the pressure within the reservoir and thus induce the flow of crude oil or else sequester gas that cannot be exported. This is not to be confused with gas lift, where gas is injected into the annulus of the well rather than the reservoir. After the crude has been pumped out, the natural gas is once again recovered. Since many of the wells found around the world contain heavy crude, this process increases their production. The basic difference between light crude and heavy crude is its viscosity and pumpability—the lighter the crude the easier it is to pump. Recovery of hydrocarbons in a well is generally limited to 50% (heavy crudes) and 75–80% (light crudes). Recycling of natural gas or other inert gases causes the pressure to rise in the well, thus causing more gas molecules to dissolve in the oil lowering its viscosity and thereby increasing the well's output. Air is not suitable for repressuring wells because it tends to cause deterioration of the oil, thus carbon dioxide or natural gas is used to repressure the well. The term 'gas-reinjection' is also sometimes referred to as repressuring—the term being used only to imply that the pressure inside the well is being increased to aid recovery.

Injection or reinjection of carbon dioxide also takes place in order to reduce the emission of CO_{2} into the atmosphere, a form of carbon sequestration. This has been proposed as a method to combat climate change, allowing mass storage of CO_{2} over a geological timescale. Reinjection of carbon dioxide in the Norwegian Sleipner gas field saves the operators 1 million Norwegian Kroners per day in national carbon taxes.
