= Ocean Traveler =

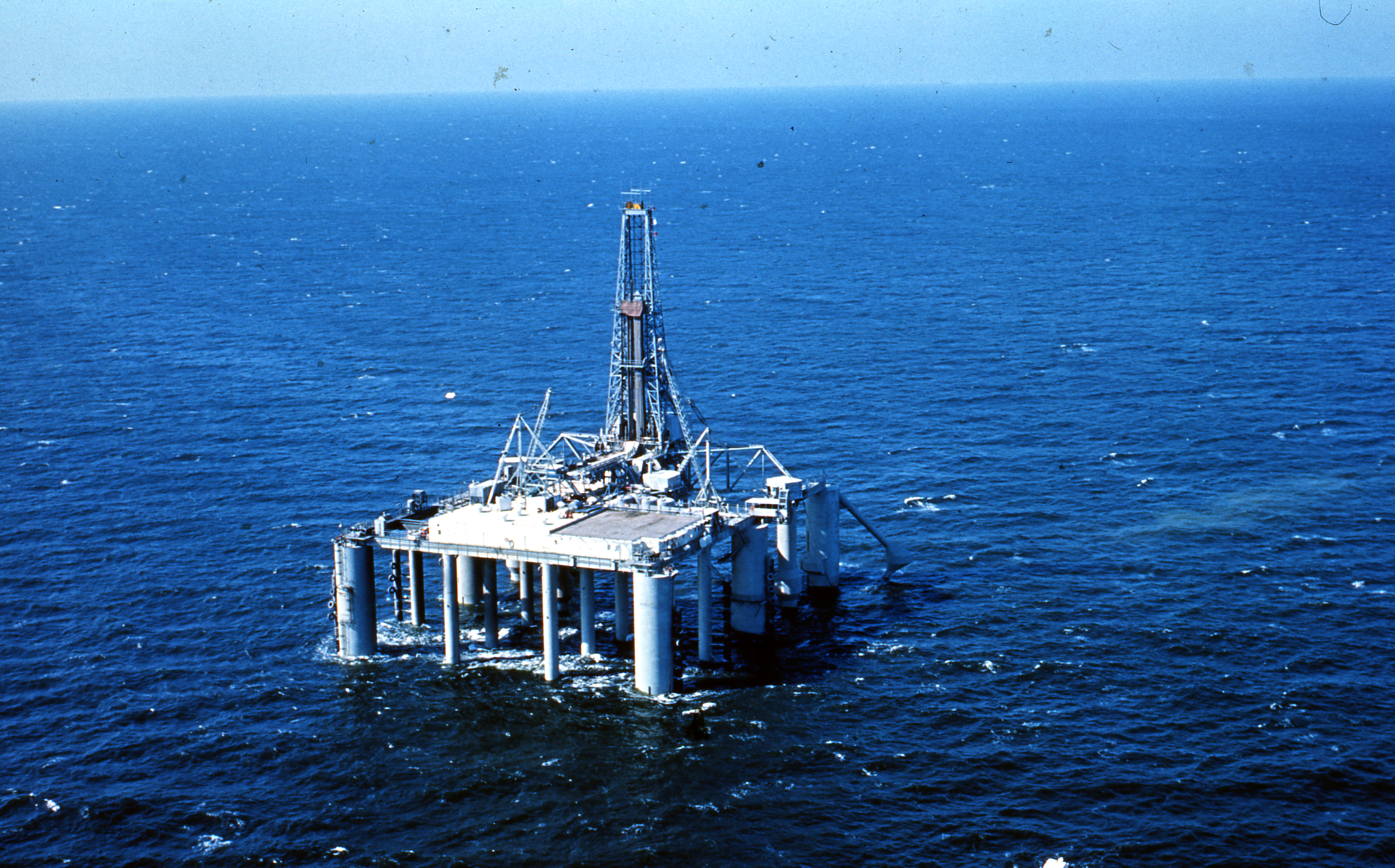

Ocean Traveler was a drilling platform built in the United States and used in the Gulf of Mexico. In 1966, it was transferred to Esso for the first exploration wells on the Norwegian continental shelf in the North Sea, following the Dutch discovery of Groningen gas field in 1959. On 16 July 1966, the platform did a limited discovery in the North Sea, in a block that much later became the discovery place of the Balder Field.

Ocean Traveler had big problems with the weather conditions in the North Sea, the weather being much tougher in the North Sea than the areas off the southern coast of the United States. These experiences laid the foundation for the sister platforms, especially the Norwegian-built "Ocean Viking", which had a significantly strengthened structure.
