= Grane oil field =

Offshore oil field in the North Sea

Grane
- Location within North Sea
- Country: Norway
- Offshore/onshore: Offshore
- Coordinates: 59.22°N 2.49°E
- Operator: Statoil
- Partners: Statoil (38%); Petoro (30%); ExxonMobil (25.60%); ConocoPhillips (6.40%)

Field history
- Discovery: 1991
- Start of production: 2003
- Peak of production: 10 March 2006
- Abandonment: 2020

Production
- Current production of oil: 34,000 m^{3}/d (210,000 bbl/d)
- Producing formations: Heimdal, Lista

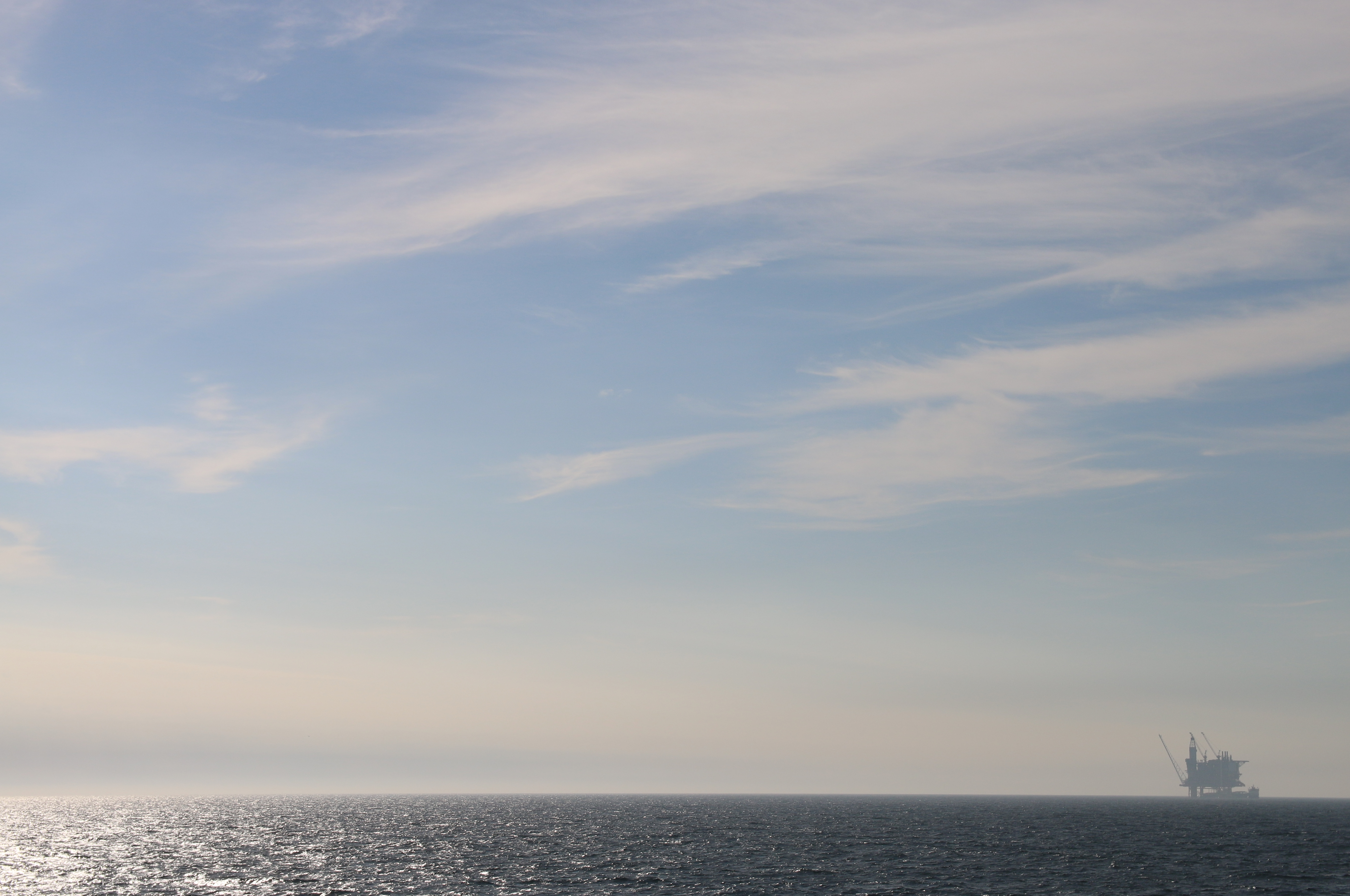
Grane Oil Field

Grane (Norwegian: Granefeltet) is an offshore oil field in the North Sea located 185 km (115 mi) west of the city of Haugesund on the western coast of Norway. It is Norway's first heavy crude oil production field and Statoil's largest heavy oil field in the Norwegian continental shelf. The oil from the field, located in Block 25/11 is transported to Sture terminal via Grane oil pipeline. The injection gas is imported to Grane oil field from the Heimdal, located just north the field.

== Ownership ==
The Grane field is operated by Statoil, with Statoil holding 38% of the stake, Petoro – 30%, ExxonMobil – 25.60%, and ConocoPhillips – 6.40%.

== Technical features ==
The field lies in 128 metres (420 ft) of water at total depth of 1,700 metres (5,600 ft). The reservoir is nearly 27 square kilometres (10 sq mi) and has an average pay thickness of 50 metres (160 ft) with an average porosity of 33% and permeability of 5–10 Darcies. The reservoir consists of sandstones of Heimdal formation of Paleocene age, Lista Formation and has high viscosity.

== Development history ==
Norsk Hydro and partners started development of the field in 1991. The Grane field started producing in September 2003. 31 production wells were put into operation. The facility was designed by Aker Solutions Engineering in 2000–2003.

== Production ==
At Grane oil field, Norsk Hydro used the technology applied at its Troll and Oseberg fields to maximize production in Grane. An estimated 700 million barrels (110×10^{6} m^{3}) is expected to be produced by the field with 214 thousand barrels per day (34.0×10^{3} m^{3}/d). With the first horizontal well drilled, Hydro already reached a peak production by 10 March 2006 setting a record at 243 thousand barrels per day (38.6×10^{3} m^{3}/d) which exceeded the initially established field plan by about 30 thousand barrels (4.8×10^{3} m^{3}). From then on, the field supplied the market an average 220 thousand barrels per day (35×10^{3} m^{3}/d). The company expects 55% recovery from the field. This makes Grane third of the size of Oseberg and twice the size of Brage. There is no gas cap in Grane field.

The production profile of the Grane field (in million Sm^{3} oil equivalent) is as follows.

Year	Production
2003	0.751066
2004	7.086147
2005	10.307771
2006	12.613752
2007	11.992443
2008	10.037249
2009	10.723929
2010	9.654461
2011	8.097365
2012	7.108406
2013	5.504911
2014	4.085547
2015	4.214624
2016	4.391
2017	5.832353
2018	5.62534
2019	5.118285
2020	3.986892
2021	3.063436
2022	2.102059
2023	2.04668

== See also ==
- Sture terminal
- Heimdal gas field
- Oseberg Transport System
- Oseberg oil field
- North Sea oil
- Economy of Norway
