= Kizomba deepwater project =

Oil drilling project off the coast of Angola

- Type of project: Oil drilling
- Owner: ExxonMobil
- Country: Angola

The Kizomba deepwater project is an oil drilling project owned and operated by ExxonMobil off the coast of northern Angola. It is named after the Kizomba Angolan dance.

ExxonMobil began production at Angola’s offshore Block 15, 145 kilometers off the northern coast of Angola, in 2003 under a production sharing contract. In 2025, Angola’s National Agency of Petroleum, Gas and Biofuels signed an addendum to the contract with ExxonMobil, extending the production period until 2037.

== Kizomba A ==
The Kizomba A project utilizes the Hungo and Chocalho oil fields, in the so-called Block 15 concession off the Angolan coast. The project consists of a TLP and an FPSO, which receives oil from the wells to be stored until transfer to tankers.

The Kizomba A FPSO (at the time of its construction the world's largest) has a storage capacity of 2.2 million barrels (350,000 m^{3}). Built at a cost of over US$800 million by Hyundai Heavy Industries in Ulsan, Korea, it is operated by ExxonMobil. In 1,200 metres (3,900 ft) of water at Deepwater block 320 kilometres (200 statute miles; 170 nautical miles) offshore in the Atlantic Ocean from Angola, West Africa, it weighs 81,000 tonnes and is 285 metres (935 ft) long, 63 metres (207 ft) wide, and 32 metres (105 ft) high.

== Kizomba B ==
Kizomba B is 8 km (5.0 mi) to the east of Kizomba A. ExxonMobil reported the startup phase in October 2005. The construction started in early 2003 and the first oil was reached in July 2005. The project is expected to recover around one billion barrels of oil, at a target production rate of 250,000bpd.

== Kizomba C ==
The third phase, Kizomba C, was designed to develop 600 million barrels of oil from the Mondo, Saxi and Batuque fields in approximately 2,400 ft (730 m) of water. It was launched in 2008 through 2 FPSOs respectively named Saxi/Batuque and Mondo with a 100,000 bpd production capacity.
