= Grane Oil Pipeline =

Pipeline system in Norway

Grane oil pipeline

Location
- Country: Norway
- Coordinates: 60°37′16″N 4°51′09″E
- Direction: south-southeast
- Start: Grane oil field
- To: Sture terminal

General information
- Type: oil
- Operator: Statoil
- Commissioned: 2003

Technical information
- Length: 220 km (140 mi)
- Maximum discharge: 0.265 million barrels per day (~1.32×10^{7} t/a)
- Diameter: 29 in (737 mm)

The Grane oil pipeline (Norwegian: Grane oljerørledning) is a pipeline system in western Norway. It is 220 kilometres (140 mi) long and runs from Grane oil field to the Sture terminal, located 65 kilometres (40 mi) north of Bergen, Norway. The pipeline operations commenced with start of production in the Grane oil field.

== Technical features ==
The pipeline diameter is 29 inches (740 mm). The capacity of the Grane oil pipeline is 34,000 cubic metres per day (1,200,000 cu ft/d) of oil. The greatest sea depth pipeline passes through is 355 metres (1,165 ft) - through the Norwegian Trench. Over 110,000 tonnes of rock and gravel were used on the seabed to establish the correct foundation for the pipeline. The estimated lifetime of the pipeline is expected to be 30 years.

== Ownership ==
The Grane pipeline is operated by Statoil and includes other partners.

Company	Share
Petoro AS	48.60%
ExxonMobil Exploration and Production Norway AS	25.60%
Statoil	24.40%
Norske Conoco AS	2.4%

Total investment at start-up was nearly 1.6 billion NOK's.

== See also ==
- Oseberg oil field
- Grane oil field
- Sture terminal
- North Sea oil
