= Djeno =

- Location in the Republic of the Congo
- Coordinates: 4°55′21″S 11°56′53″E
- Country: Republic of the Congo
- Department: Pointe-Noire
- District: Tchiamba-Nzassi
- Elevation: 66 ft (20 m)

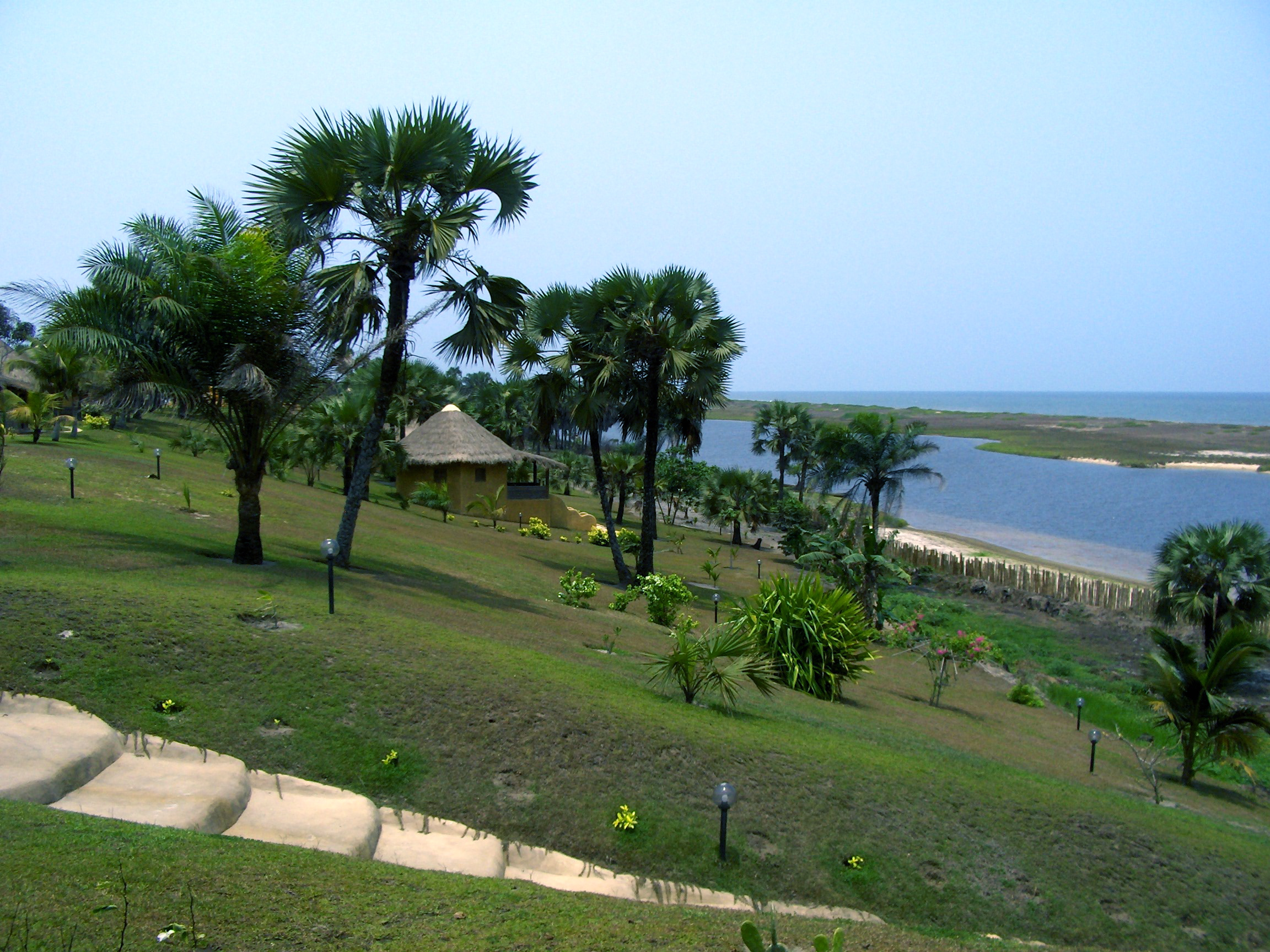
Djeno : The tourist Litoral hills

Djeno is a small village in the Pointe-Noire Department of Congo-Brazzaville. It is located near the Total E&P Congo, at the southern exit of Pointe-Noire along the road called "Ligne Neuf" (officially the National Road 4), around 18 kilometers from the center of Pointe-Noire. The population is about 1,500 inhabitants, who are called Vily.

== Climate ==
The climate is hot and humid, like other parts of Congo-Brazzaville.

== Culture ==
The population, called Vily, practice ancestor worship and follow traditional customs, called Binkoko. Some of the population have converted to Christianity.

== Economy ==
Djeno's economy is agricultural. The people produce cassava and vegetables and go fishing in rivers such as Loeme and Nanga.

== Transport ==
A bus is available from Pointe-Noire to Djeno for 500 CFA on the outward journey and 300 CFA to return.

== Tourism ==
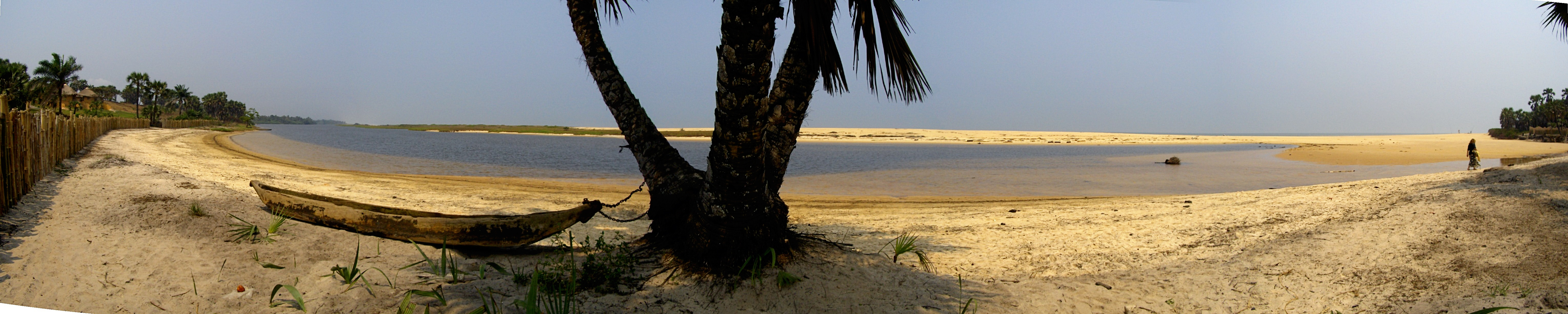
Djeno : Beach landscape view
