= Norwegian continental shelf =

Norwegian administrative area, rich in petroleum and gas

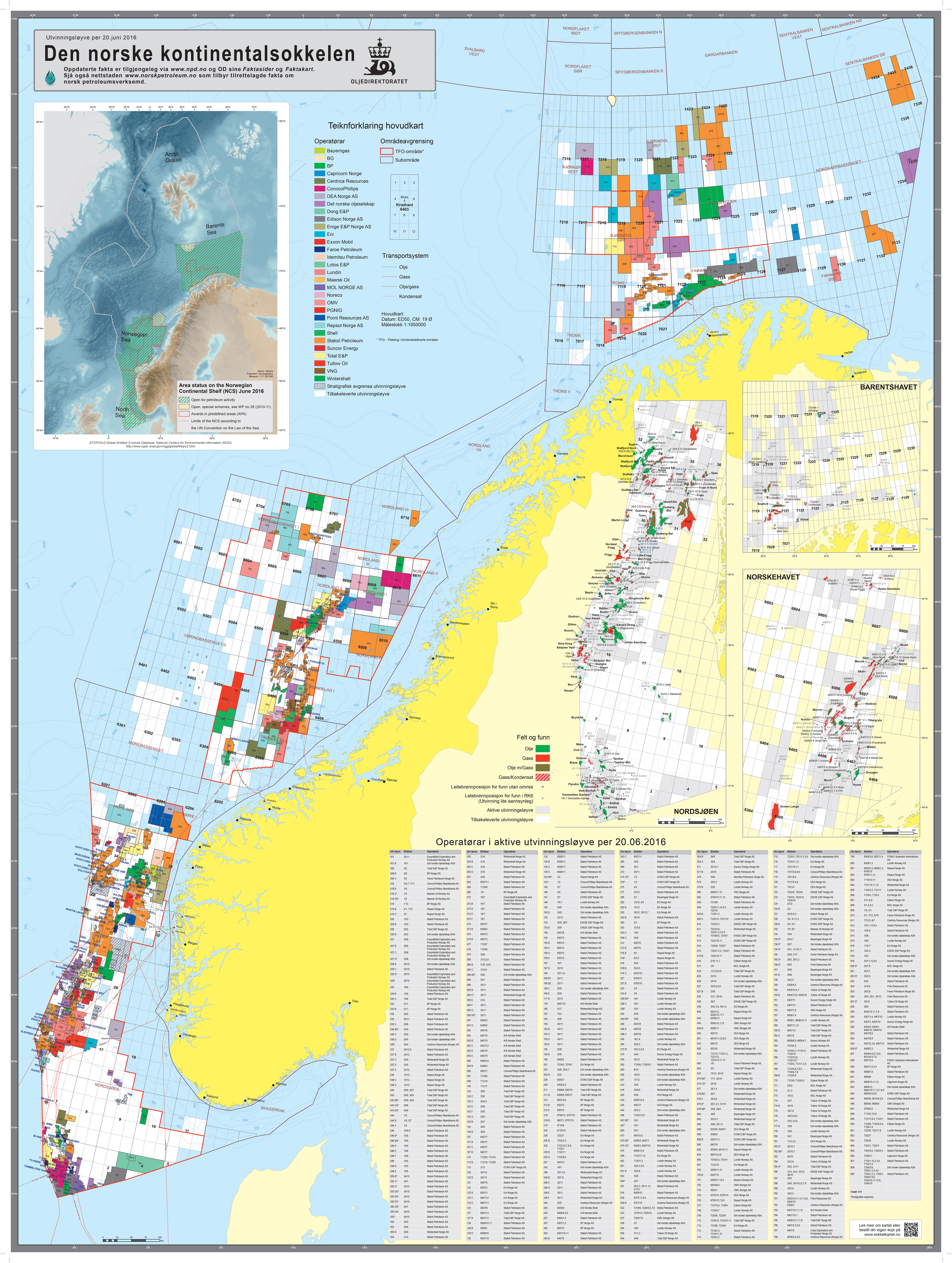
The Norwegian continental shelf as of June 20th, 2016. It shows all fields, discoveries, areas awarded and areas that have been opened for exploration activities

The Norwegian continental shelf (Norwegian: Den norske kontinentalsokkelen) (abbreviated as NCS) is the continental shelf over which Norway exercises sovereign rights as defined by the United Nations Convention on the Law of the Sea.

The area of the shelf is four times the area of Norway mainland and constitutes about one-third of the Europe continental shelf. It is rich in petroleum and gas and it is the base of the petroleum economy of Norway.
