= Oseberg oil field =

Norwegian oil and natural gas field

Oseberg
- Location within North Sea
- Country: Norway
- Offshore/onshore: Offshore
- Coordinates: 60°29′30.7104″N 2°49′38.3304″E
- Operators: Equinor

Field history
- Discovery: 1979
- Start of production: 1988

Production
- Current production of oil: 14,121 m^{3}/d (88,820 bbl/d)
- Producing formations: Upper Triassic to Lower Jurassic Statfjord formation; Middle Jurassic, Oseberg, Rannoch, Etive, Ness and Tarbert formations

Oseberg (Norwegian: Osebergfeltet) is an offshore oil field with a gas cap in the North Sea located 140 km (87 mi) northwest of the city of Bergen on the southwestern coast of Norway. The field, which is 25 km long by 7 km wide, was discovered in 1979 and its development is known to be one of the significant milestones in emergence of Norway's independent oil and gas industry. The Oseberg field was named after Oseberg ship, one of Norway's most significant archeological discoveries. The ancient Viking ship from the early 9th century was discovered in a 1904 historical excavation of a burial mound at the Oseberg Farm, south of Oslo.

An extensive subsea pipeline network called Oseberg Transport System (OTS) transports up to 765,000 bbl/d (121,600 m^{3}/d) from the Oseberg area to Sture terminal in Norway. The sea depth in the Oseberg area is 100 meters. The Oseberg Field Centre consists of three platforms: Oseberg A, B and D, connected to each other by bridges, in the southern part of the Oseberg field and the Oseberg C platform, which is located 14 kilometers north of the field center. The operator is Equinor, in partnership with Petoro, TotalEnergies, ExxonMobil and ConocoPhillips. The field extends into blocks 30/6 and 30/9, parts of Production licenses (PL) 053 and 079.

== Exploration history ==
The first exploration well on the PL053 license, 30/6-1, was drilled as a wildcat and spudded on 19 June 1979. The well was plugged and abandoned as a gas discovery on 22 September. Subsequent appraisal wells proved oil in addition to the gas found by the discovery well and Oseberg was produced as an oilfield. The first exploration well on the PL079 license, 30/9-1 was drilled as a wildcat at the end of 1982, but treated as an appraisal after it encountered oil and gas considered to form part of the same accumulation. In 2006, well 30/9-B-19 A proved reserves in the underlying Upper Triassic to Lower Jurassic Statfjord formation. Tests are also being carried out on the overlying Upper Cretaceous Chalk Group reservoir to evaluate the flow characteristics.

The vertical gas column in the Alpha block was 380 m while the underlying oil column was about 215 m before production began.

A total of 31 exploration and appraisal wells have been drilled on the Oseberg structure, although this includes sidetracks and re-entries. Of these wells, only three proved 'dry'.

== Development history ==
Development drilling began in 1985 with a production well drilled from the B template. By the end of 2009 184 development wells had been completed, consisting of a mixture of production wells, observation wells, water injectors, gas injectors and cuttings injectors. Production was from deviated wells until 1992, when the first horizontal well was drilled. By June 1997, 28 horizontal wells had been completed, including three multilaterals. Horizontal drilling close to the oil-water contact was considered key to prolonging the plateau oil production period and achieving high recovery rates.

== Seismic data acquisition ==
The initial discovery well was sited using 2D seismic reflection data. In 1982, the first 3D seismic dataset was acquired over Oseberg, to assist with continuing exploration and appraisal drilling. In 1989 and 1991 Statoil acquired two sets of 3D data over the field, using the same parameters, as a feasibility study for a full 4D seismic study. Following the success of the pilot study, additional surveys were shot in 1992, 1999, 2004 and 2007. These surveys are used to actively monitor changes in the gas-oil contact and the water-oil contact as production continues.

== Production ==
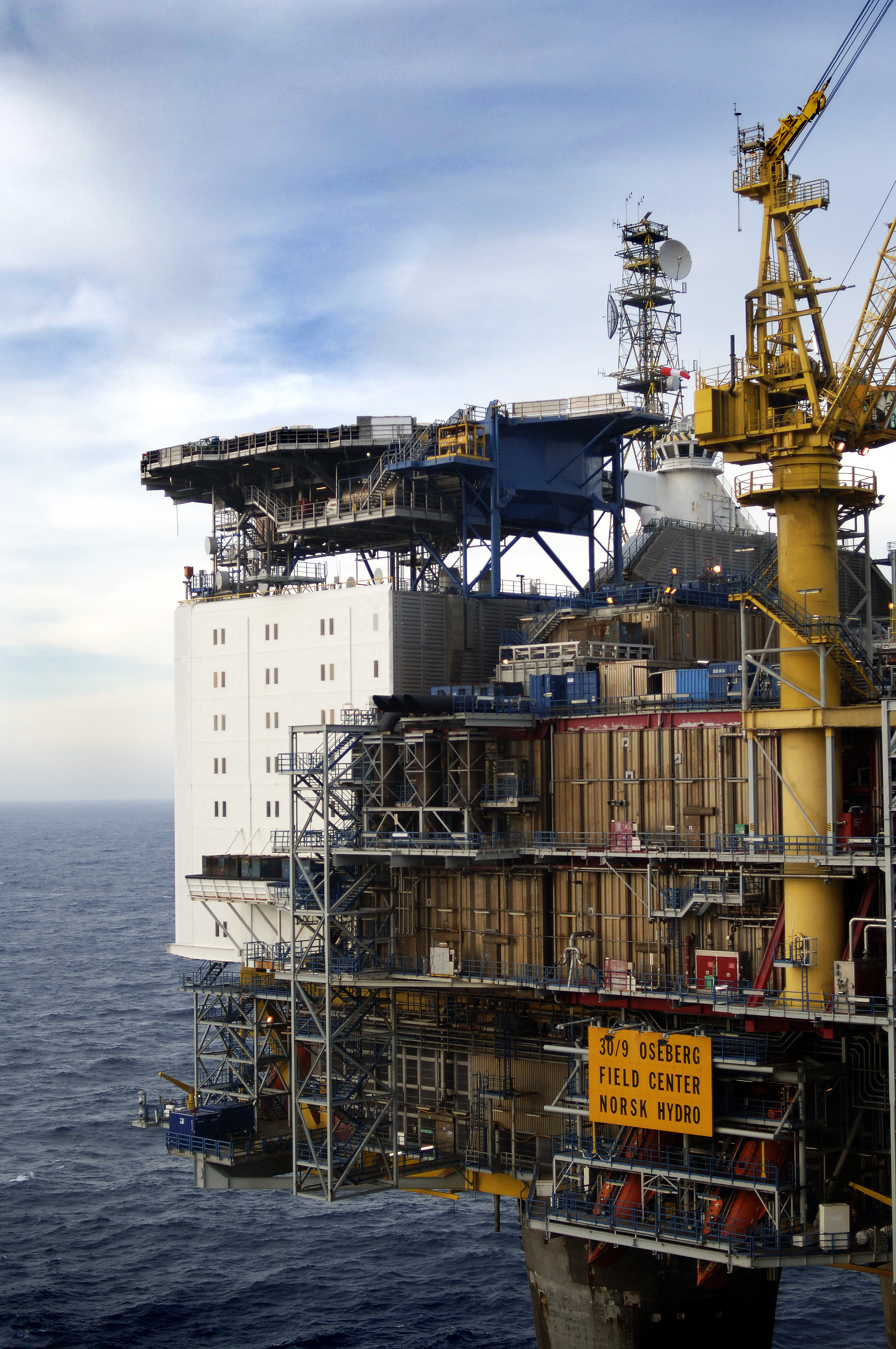
Oseberg Field Center.

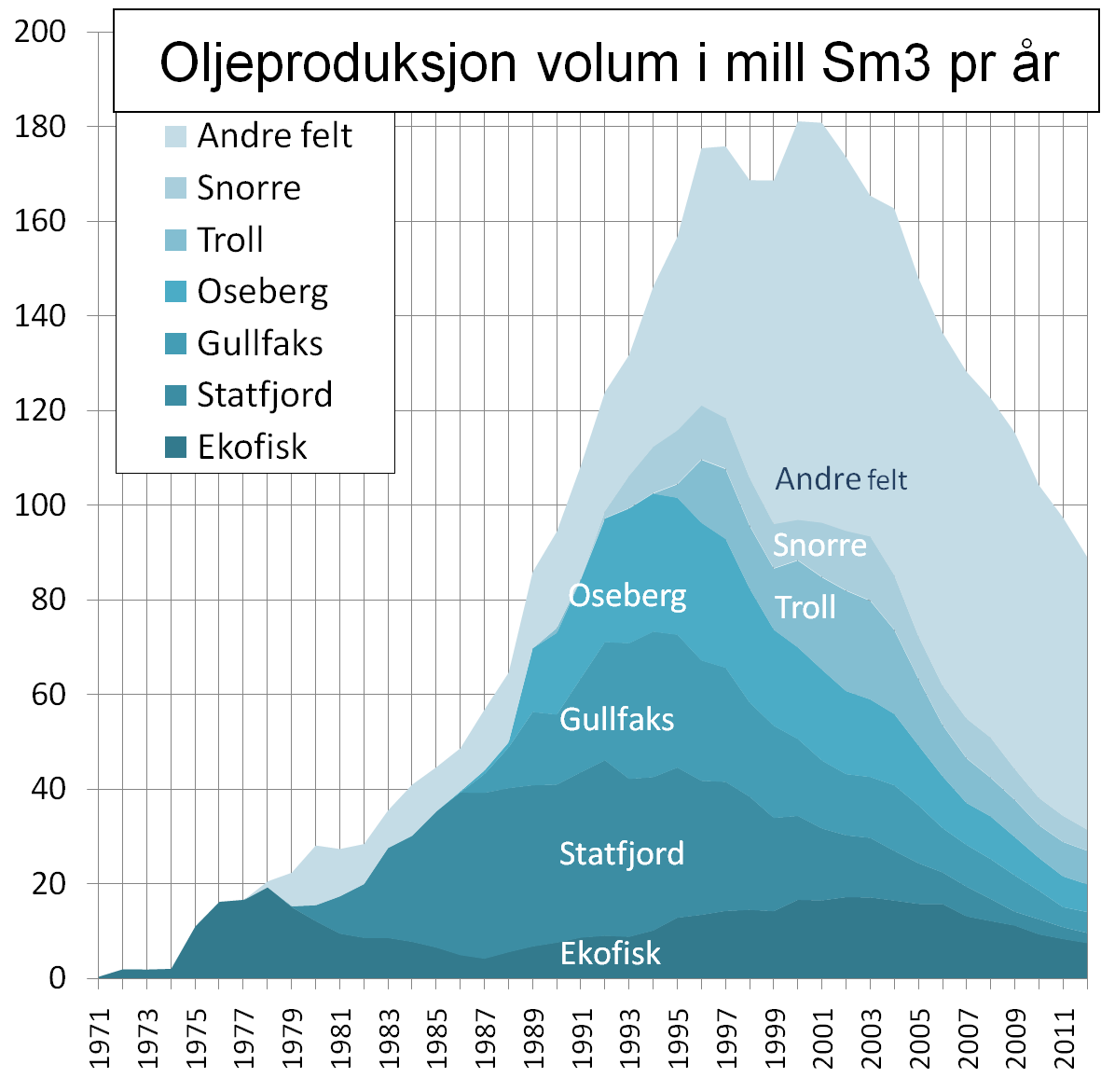
Petroleum production of Norway by year and oil field

Oseberg A is a concrete base platform which includes process equipment and accommodation quarters; Oseberg B sits on top of a steel jacket, and has drilling, production and injection facilities; Oseberg D is a steel platform with gas processing and export equipment which was connected to the Field Centre by a bridge in 1999. Oseberg C is an integrated drilling, accommodation and production platform with a steel jacket. Oseberg Vestflanke was developed with a subsea template tied back to Oseberg B. Oseberg Delta will be developed with a subsea template tied back to Oseberg D. Production from the Gamma Main structure in the Statfjord Formation started in the spring of 2008 with two wells from the Oseberg Field Center. The facilities at the field center process oil and gas from the fields Oseberg Øst, Oseberg Sør and Tune. The Plan for Development and Operation (PDO) for the northern part of Oseberg was confirmed on 19 January 1988. The PDO for Oseberg D was approved on 13 December 1996, for Oseberg Vestflanke – on 19 December 2003 and for Oseberg Delta on 23 September 2005. The oil from the field is produced by maintenance of pressure through gas and water injection and by water gas injection (WAG). Injection gas used for pressure maintenance was previously brought from Troll Øst (TOGI) and Oseberg Vest. Other smaller parts of the field produce by pressure depletion.

The field has been producing since 1 December 1988. Plateau oil production of 81,000 Sm^{3} per day ended in 1997. Current production (total for 2009 to September) as per stats is 3.788063 mill S m^{3} of oil, 2.926727 bill Sm^{3} of gas, 0.462964 mill tonnes of NGL.

Key specification data for the Oseberg platforms is summarised in the table.

	Oseberg A	Oseberg B	Oseberg C	Oseberg D
Type	Concrete gravity base	Fixed steel	Fixed steel	Fixed steel
Block	30/9	30/9	30/6	30/9
Coordinates	60.491341N 2.825642E	60.492816N 2.826518E	60.607820N 2.773917E	60.490144N 2.827314E
Water depth, m	109	108	108	109
Legs	4 concrete shafts 18 m diameter	4		
Well slots	-	48		
Installed	1988	1988	1991	2000
Substructure weight, tonnes	115,000	18,800	14,000	5,983
Topsides weight, tonnes	41,979	15,019	24,216	10,880
Deck dimensions, m	106 × 61 × 14			
Function	Processing, accommodation	Drilling	Integrated drilling accommodation, production	Gas processing and export
Facilities	2 separation modules, 2 compression modules, water injection, 60MW generation, flare boom 105 m			
Production throughput	240,000 bopd			
Gas compression	27 million m^{3}/d			
Water injection	300,000 bwpd			
Accommodation	300			
Main contractors	Norwegian Contractors, Kvaerner,	Norconsult/McDermott, Norwegian Petroleum consultants, RDS		
Production start	April 1989			

== Geology ==
=== Regional setting ===
The Oseberg field is one of a series of hydrocarbon accumulations within the Viking Graben. This part of the northern North Sea has been affected by two main rift episodes; in the Permo-Triassic and the mid-late Jurassic. This leads to complex variations of the earlier syn-rift sequence thickness across the later rift structures. In the Oseberg area, the major faults formed during these two phases dip in opposite directions and the size of the earlier basins are typically double the size of the later. The east-tilted Late Jurassic Oseberg structure is underlain by a larger-scale west-tilted Permo-Triassic half-graben.

=== Reservoirs ===
The main reservoirs are sandstones of the Middle Jurassic Oseberg, Rannoch, Etive, Ness and Tarbert formations of the Brent Group. These are the deposits of prograding delta systems, with an overall shallowing upwards as the delta filled the available accommodation space. The Oseberg formation represents the deposits of a series of sand-rich deltas that advanced westwards from the Norwegian coastline. The rest of the group are the deposits of the massive northward prograding Brent delta system, which occupied the entire southern part of the Viking graben area. There is a progressive transition in the depositional environment from subaqueous fans, through fan deltas and shoreface to delta plain. The uppermost Tarbert formation may represent reworked delta plain deposits at the onset of the marine transgression shown by the overlying claystones of the Viking group. The Brent Group reservoirs, which lie at depths between 2300 and 2700 m, generally have excellent properties with porosities around 20–30% and permeabilities ranging up to several darcys.

The Statfjord formation, which is of Ryazanian to Sinemurian age is separated from the Brent Group by the Dunlin Group, which is a non-reservoir sequence. This means that there is normally no communication between the Statfjord formation and the Brent Group reservoirs. The Statfjord formation consists of massive sandstones. The lower boundary is taken at the transition from red continental shales of the Lunde formation to the overlying sandstones. The top of the unit, which consists of calcareous sandstones, shows a relatively sharp transition to the dark shales and siltstones of the overlying Dunlin group. The depositional environment changes from alluvial plain and braided stream deposits that make up the bulk of the formation to coarse sandstones with pebble lags and channeling, thought to indicate a coastal environment. The presence of glauconite and marine fossils in the uppermost sandstones indicate deposition in a shallow marine environment.

=== Structure ===
The trap is a group of three easterly dipping tilted fault blocks associated with westerly dipping normal faults formed by rifting during the Late Jurassic on the east side of the Viking Graben. The three main fault blocks are known as Alpha, Gamma and Alpha North. The eastern boundary of the Oseberg fault blocks with the Horda Platform is formed by the major Brage fault. The structural dip is an average 6–10 degrees.

=== Seal ===
The top seal is formed by Upper Jurassic Viking group or Lower Cretaceous Cromer Knoll claystones. There is also evidence in the Oseberg area for some element of fault seal.

=== Sources ===
The oil in Oseberg is sourced from the Upper Jurassic Draupne formation, equivalent to the Kimmeridge Clay formation. Oils generated in at least two different 'kitchens' have been identified within the Oseberg area. The gas is likely to be sourced from over-mature Draupne formation in the deepest part of these kitchens.

== Reserves ==
Initial recoverable reserves for the Oseberg field are estimated as 366.4 million Sm^{3} oil, 107.0 billion Sm^{3} gas and 9.3 million tonnes NGL. As of 31 December 2008 remaining recoverable reserves were estimated at 21.1 million Sm^{3} oil, 85.6 billion Sm^{3} gas and 3.5 million tonnes NGL.

== See also ==
- Sture terminal
- Oseberg Transport System
- Grane oil field
- Grane oil pipeline
- North Sea oil
- Economy of Norway
- Ekofisk oil field
