= Oseberg Transport System =

Pipelines in Norway

Oseberg Transport System (OTS)

Location
- Country: Norway
- Direction: west-east
- Start: Oseberg
- To: Sture terminal

General information
- Type: oil
- Operator: Norsk Hydro
- Commissioned: 1988

Technical information
- Length: 115 km (71 mi)
- Maximum discharge: 765,000 barrels per day (121,600 m^{3}/d)

Oseberg Transport System (OTS) (Norwegian: Oseberg Transport System, OTS) is a pipeline system in western Norway. It is 115 km (71 mi) long and runs from Oseberg, Veslefrikk, Brage, Frøy and Lille-Frigg to Sture terminal, located 65 kilometres (40 mi) north of Bergen, Norway on Alvøy island. The operation of the pipeline was commenced in 1988. Total investment in the pipeline construction was about 9.8 billion NOK.

== Technical features ==
The pipeline is placed in a tunnel close to the coast line. The tunnel is 2.3 kilometres (1.4 mi) long and its opening is at depth of 80 metres (260 ft). The pipeline diameter is 28 inches (710 mm). The capacity of OTS is 765,000 barrels per day (121,600 m^{3}/d). Operating life is expected to be nearly 40 years

== Ownership ==
The OTS is operated by Statoil and includes other licensees

Company	Share
Petoro AS	48.38%
Norsk Hydro	22.24%
Statoil ASA	14.0%
TOTAL E&P NORGE AS	8.65%
Mobil Development Norway	4.33%
Norske Conoco A/S	2.4%

== See also ==
- Oseberg oil field
- Grane oil field
- Sture terminal
- North Sea oil
