= Economy of Norway =

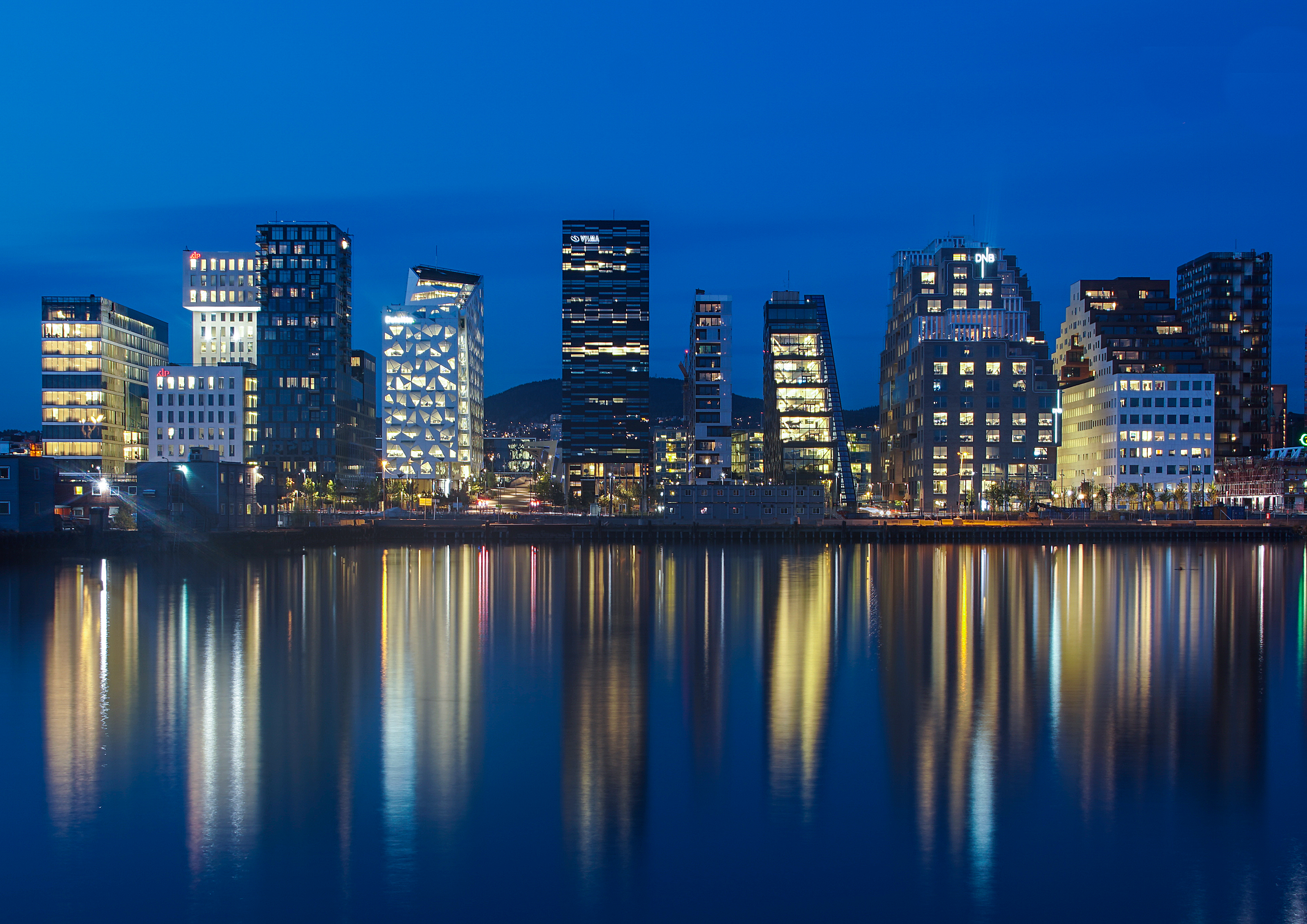
- Barcode, Oslo
- Currency: Norwegian krone (NOK • KR)
- Fiscal year: Calendar year
- Trade organisations: EFTA, OECD, WTO, EEA and others
- Country group: Advanced economy; High-income economy

Statistics
- Population: ▲5,367,580 (2020)
- GDP: ▲$506.470 billion (nominal; 2025 est.); ▲$606.590 billion (PPP; 2025 est.)
- GDP rank: 31st (nominal; 2025); 49th (PPP; 2025)
- GDP growth: 1.5% (2024)
- GDP per capita: ▼$90,320 (nominal; 2025); ▲$107,892 (PPP; 2025)
- GDP per capita rank: 4th (nominal; 2024); 5th (PPP; 2025)
- GDP per capita growth: 0.4% (2025)
- GDP by sector: Agriculture: 1.6%; Industry: 34.7%; Services: 63.5%; (2016 est.)
- Inflation (CPI): 3.3% (2024 est.)
- Population below national poverty line: NA; 15.7% at risk of poverty or social exclusion (AROPE, 2024)
- Gini coefficient: 24.4 low (2024)
- Human Development Index: 0.966 very high (2022) (2nd); 0.903 very high IHDI (2nd) (2022)
- Corruption Perceptions Index: 84 out of 100 points (2023) (4th)
- Labour force: 2.8 million (Q2 2020); ▼80.4% employment rate (2023)
- Labour force by occupation: Agriculture: 2.1%; Industry: 19.3%; Services: 78.6%; (2016 est.)
- Unemployment: 3.9% (Jan. 2024); 12.8% youth unemployment (15 to 24-year-olds; June 2020); 129,000 unemployed (Q2 2020)
- Average gross salary: 63,644 kr / €5,401 monthly (2024)
- Average net salary: 45,772 kr / €3,882 monthly (2024)
- Main industries: Petroleum; natural gas; shipping; fishing; aquaculture; food processing; shipbuilding; pulp and paper; metals; chemicals; timber; mining; textiles

External
- Exports: $102.8 billion (2017 est.)
- Export goods: Petroleum and petroleum products, machinery and equipment, metals, chemicals, ships, fish
- Main export partners: United Kingdom 19%; Germany 19%; Netherlands 8.3%; Sweden 7.7%; Poland 6.1%; France 5.9%; (2023)
- Imports: $95.06 billion (2017 est.)
- Import goods: Machinery and equipment, chemicals, metals, foodstuffs
- Main import partners: Germany 11.4%; China 11.2%; Sweden 10.8%; United States 7.6%; Netherlands 4.8%; Denmark 4.7%; (2023)
- FDI stock: $236.5 billion (31 December 2017 est.); Abroad: $196.3 billion (31 December 2017 est.)
- Current account: $73.13 billion (2024 est.)
- Gross external debt: $642.3 billion (31 March 2016 est.)

Public finance
- Government debt: 36.5% of GDP (2017 est.) (Note: data cover general government debt and include debt instruments issued (or owned) by government entities other than the treasury; the data exclude treasury debt held by foreign entities; the data exclude debt issued by subnational entities, as well as intragovernmental debt; intragovernmental debt consists of treasury borrowings from surpluses in the social funds, such as for retirement, medical care, and unemployment; debt instruments for the social funds are not sold at public auctions)
- Foreign reserves: $65.92 billion (31 December 2017 est.)
- Budget balance: +4.4% (of GDP) (2017 est.)
- Revenue: 217.1 billion (2017 est.)
- Spending: 199.5 billion (2017 est.)
- Economic aid: $4.0 billion (donor), 1.1% of GDP (2017)
- Credit rating: Standard & Poor's: AAA (Domestic) AAA (Foreign) AAA (T&C Assessment) Outlook: Stable; Moody's: Aaa Outlook: Stable; Fitch: AAA Outlook: Stable; Scope: AAA Outlook: Stable
- All values, unless otherwise stated, are in US dollars.

Norway has a highly developed social democratic economy with state-ownership in strategic areas. Although sensitive to global business cycles, the economy of Norway has shown robust growth since the start of the industrial era. The country has a very high standard of living compared with other European countries. Norway's modern manufacturing and welfare system rely on a financial reserve produced by exploitation of natural resources, particularly North Sea oil. Among OECD nations, Norway has a relatively efficient and strong social security system; social expenditure in 2022 was below the OECD average and stood at roughly 20.7% of GDP.

== History ==
=== Pre–industrial revolution ===
Norway was the poorest of the three Scandinavian kingdoms (the others being Denmark and Sweden) during the Viking Age.

Prior to the industrial revolution, Norway's economy was largely based on agriculture, timber, and fishing. Norwegians typically lived under conditions of considerable scarcity, though famine was rare. Except for certain fertile areas in Hedemarken and Østfold, crops were limited to hardy grains, such as oats, rye, and barley; and livestock to sheep, goats, cattle, pigs, and some poultry; in places this was complemented with hunting. In areas of Central and Northern Norway, the Sami subsisted on the nomadic herding of reindeer. Fishing all around the coast was dangerous work, though fish such as herring, cod, halibut, and other cold-water species were found in abundance. The introduction of the potato to Norway, promoted by practical priests and the king in Copenhagen in the 18th century, provided considerable relief and became common food for Norwegians.

All around the coast, the harvesting of fish (including cod, herring, halibut, and other cold water species) was an important supplement to farming and was in many areas in the north and west the primary household subsistence. Fishing was typically supplemented with crop-growing and the raising of livestock on small farms.

The economic conditions in Norway did not lend themselves to the formation of feudal system, though several kings did reward land to loyal subjects who became knights. Self-owning farmers were—and continue to be—the main unit of work in Norwegian agriculture, but leading up to the 19th century farmers ran out of land available for farming. Many agricultural families were reduced to poverty as tenant farmers, and served as the impetus for emigration to North America. Norway, after Ireland, became the country losing the most people to this emigration in percentage relative to its population.

=== Industrial revolution ===
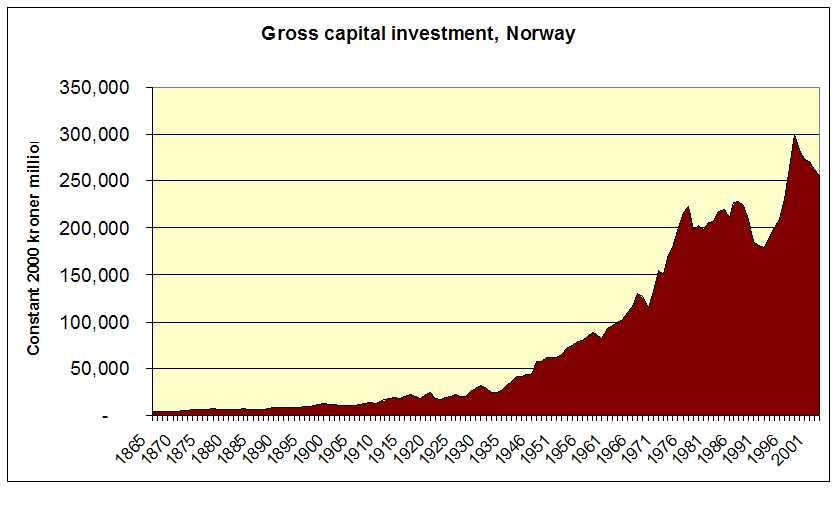
Capital formation (1865–2003). Source: Statistics Norway.

Aside from mining in Kongsberg, Røros, and Løkken, industrialization came with the first textile mills that were built in Norway in the middle of the 19th century. But the first large industrial enterprises came into formation when entrepreneurs' politics led to the founding of banks to serve those needs.

Industries also offered employment for a large number of individuals who were displaced from the agricultural sector. As wages from industry exceeded those from agriculture, the shift started a long-term trend of reduction in cultivated land and rural population patterns. The working class became a distinct phenomenon in Norway, with its own neighborhoods, culture, and politics.

=== Social democratic reforms ===
After World War II, the Norwegian Labour Party, with Einar Gerhardsen as prime minister, embarked on a number of social democratic reforms aimed at flattening the income distribution, eliminating poverty, ensuring social services such as retirement, medical care, and disability benefits to all, and putting more of the nation's capital into public trust.

Highly conservative income taxes, the introduction of value-added tax, and a wide variety of special surcharges and taxes made Norway one of the most heavily taxed economies in the world. Authorities particularly taxed discretionary spending, levying special taxes on automobiles, tobacco, alcohol, cosmetics, etc.

Norway's long-term social democratic policies, extensive governmental tracking of information, and the homogeneity of its population lent themselves particularly well for economic study, and academic research from Norway proved to make significant contributions to the field of macroeconomics during this era. When Norway became a petroleum-exporting country, the economic effects came under further study.

=== Petroleum and post-industrialism ===
==== Oil-exporting country ====
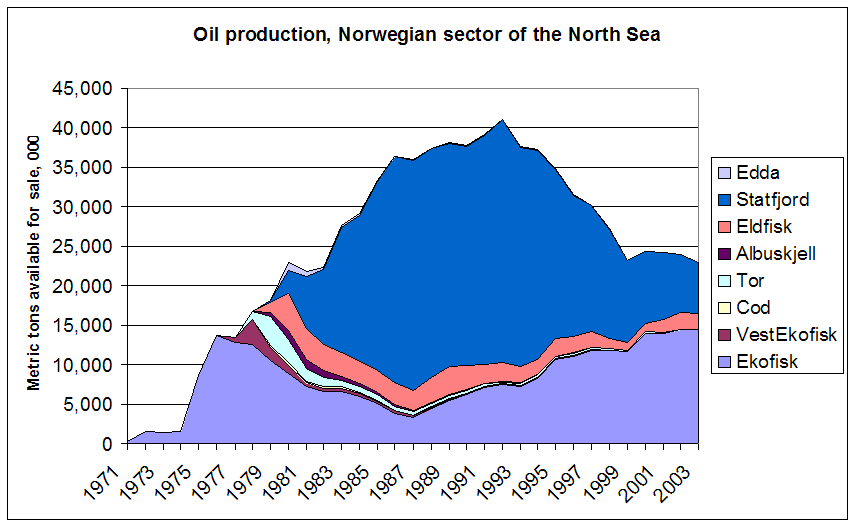
Oil production, Norwegian sector. Source: Statistics Norway.

In May 1963, Norway asserted sovereign rights over natural resources in its sector of the North Sea. Exploration started on 19 July 1966, when Ocean Traveler drilled its first well. Oil was first encountered at the Balder oil field at flank of the Utsira High, about 190 km west of Stavanger, in 1967. Initial exploration was fruitless, until Ocean Viking found oil on 21 August 1969. By the end of 1969, it was clear that there were large oil and gas reserves in the North Sea.

Against the backdrop of the Norwegian referendum to not join the European Union, the Norwegian Ministry of Industry, headed by Ola Skjåk Bræk moved quickly to establish a national energy policy. Norway decided to stay out of OPEC, keep its own energy prices in line with world markets, and spend the revenue – known as the "currency gift" – wisely. The Norwegian government established its own oil company, Statoil (now known as Equinor), and awarded drilling and production rights to Norsk Hydro and the newly formed Saga Petroleum. Petroleum exports are taxed at a marginal rate of 78% (standard corporate tax of 24%, and a special petroleum tax of 54%).

The North Sea turned out to present many technological challenges for production and exploration, and Norwegian companies invested in building capabilities to meet these challenges. A number of engineering and construction companies emerged from the remnants of the largely lost shipbuilding industry, creating centers of competence in Stavanger and the western suburbs of Oslo. Stavanger also became the land-based staging area for the offshore drilling industry. Presently North Sea is past its peak oil production. New oil and gas fields have been found and developed in the large Norwegian areas of the Norwegian Sea and the Barents Sea, including Snøhvit.

==== Reservations about the European Union ====
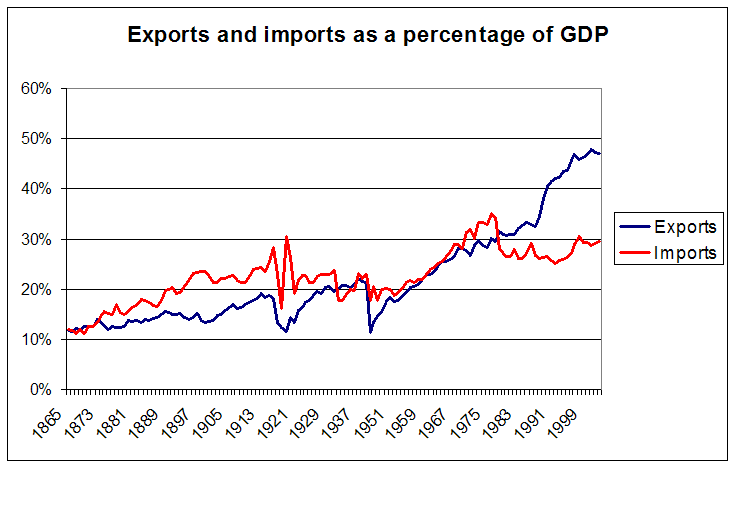
Exports and imports in Norway

In September 1972, the Norwegian parliament put to a referendum the question whether Norway should join the European Economic Community. The proposal was turned down with a slim margin. The Norwegian government proceeded to negotiate a trade agreement with the EU that would give Norwegian companies access to European markets. Over time, Norway renegotiated and refined this agreement, ultimately joining the European Free Trade Association and the European Economic Area.

Although Norway's trade policies have long aimed at harmonizing its industrial and trade policy with the EU's, a new referendum in 1994 gave the same result as in 1972, and Norway remains one of only two Nordic countries outside the EU, the other being Iceland.

Although much of the highly divisive public debate about EU membership turned on political rather than economic issues, it formed economic policy in several important ways:

- Both politicians and the public came to terms with the fact that Norway's economic development was dependent on taking advantage of its comparative advantage by specializing in certain areas for export and relying on import for everything else. This has had a significant effect on Norway's agricultural policy, which has been reshaped to address population patterns rather than self-sufficiency.
- The proceeds from oil revenue could not fuel private or public consumption if Norway were to sustain its prosperity when oil reserves run out.
- In order to participate in European markets, Norway has had to open its domestic markets to European imports. Although some pricing and distribution issues (e.g., alcohol and automobiles) remain unresolved, Norway's consumer, capital, and employment markets are increasingly approaching those of Europe in general.

Norwegians have sought accommodations on a range of specific issues, such as products from fish farms, agricultural products, emission standards, etc., but these do not appear to differ substantially from those sought by bona fide EU members. It is expected that the issue of membership will be brought to a referendum again at some point.

==== Post-industrial economic developments ====
Several issues have dominated the debate on Norway's economy since the 1970s:

- Cost of living. Norway is among the most expensive countries in the world, as reflected in the Big Mac Index and other indices. Historically, transportation costs and barriers to free trade had caused the disparity, but in recent years, Norwegian policy in labor relations, taxation, and other areas have contributed significantly.
- Competitiveness of "mainland" industries. The high cost of labor and other structural features of the Norwegian environment have caused concern about Norway's ability to maintain its standard of living in a post-petroleum era. There is a clear trend toward ending the practice of "protecting" certain industries (vernede industrier) and making more of them "exposed to competition" (konkurranseutsettelse). In addition to interest in information technology, a number of small- to medium-sized companies have been formed to develop and market highly specialized technology solutions.
- The role of the public sector. The ideological divide between socialist and non-socialist views on public ownership has decreased over time. The Norwegian government has sought to reduce its ownership over companies that require access to private capital markets, and there is an increasing emphasis on government facilitating entrepreneurship rather than controlling (or restricting) capital formation. A residual distrust of the "profit motive" persists, and Norwegian companies are heavily regulated, especially with respect to labor relations.
- The future of the welfare state. Since World War II, successive Norwegian governments have sought to broaden and extend public benefits to its citizens, in the form of sickness and disability benefits, minimum guaranteed pensions, heavily subsidized or free universal health care, unemployment insurance, and so on. Public policy still favors the provision of such benefits, but there is increasing debate on making them more equitable and needs-based.
- Urbanization. For several decades, agricultural policy in Norway was based on the premise of minimal self-sufficiency. In later years, this has given way to a greater emphasis on maintaining population patterns outside of major urban areas. The term "district policy" (distriktspolitikk) has come to mean the demand that old and largely rural Norway is allowed to persist, ideally by providing them with a sustainable economic basis.
- Taxation. The primary purpose of the Norwegian tax system has been to raise revenue for public expenditures; but it is also viewed as a means to achieve social objectives, such as redistribution of income, reduction in alcohol and tobacco consumption, and as a disincentive against certain behaviors. Three elements of the tax system seem to attract the most debate:
  - Progressive taxation. At one time one of the most aggressive in the world, the top marginal tax rate on income has been decreased over time. In addition, Norwegians are taxed for their stated net worth, which some have argued discourages savings.
  - Value-added tax. The largest source of government revenue. The current standard rate is 25%, food and drink is 15%, and movie theater tickets and public transportation 12%.
  - Special surcharges and taxes. The government has established a number of taxes related to specific purchases, including cars, alcohol, tobacco, and various kinds of benefits.
  - Svalbard. People living on Svalbard (Spitsbergen) pay reduced taxes due to the Svalbard Treaty.
- Environmental concerns. A number of political issues have had their origins in ecological concerns, including the refineries at Mongstad and the hydroelectric power plant at Alta.

== State ownership role ==
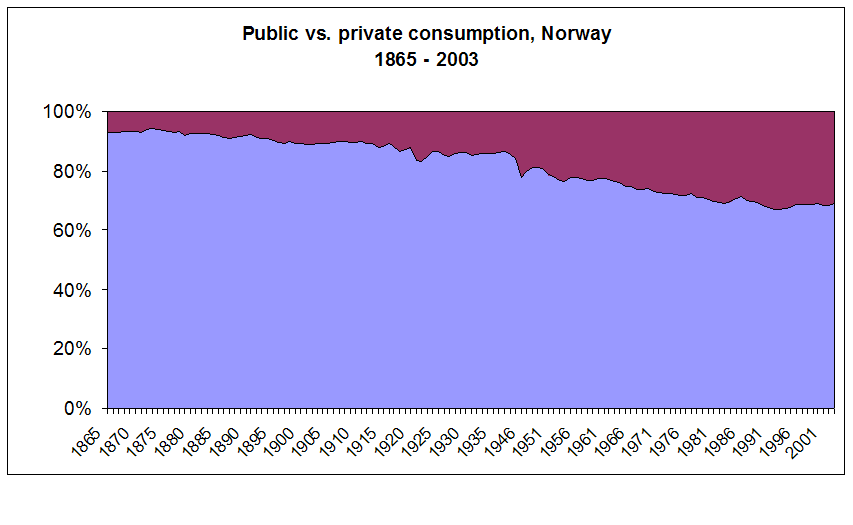
Public vs. private consumption. Source: Statistics Norway.

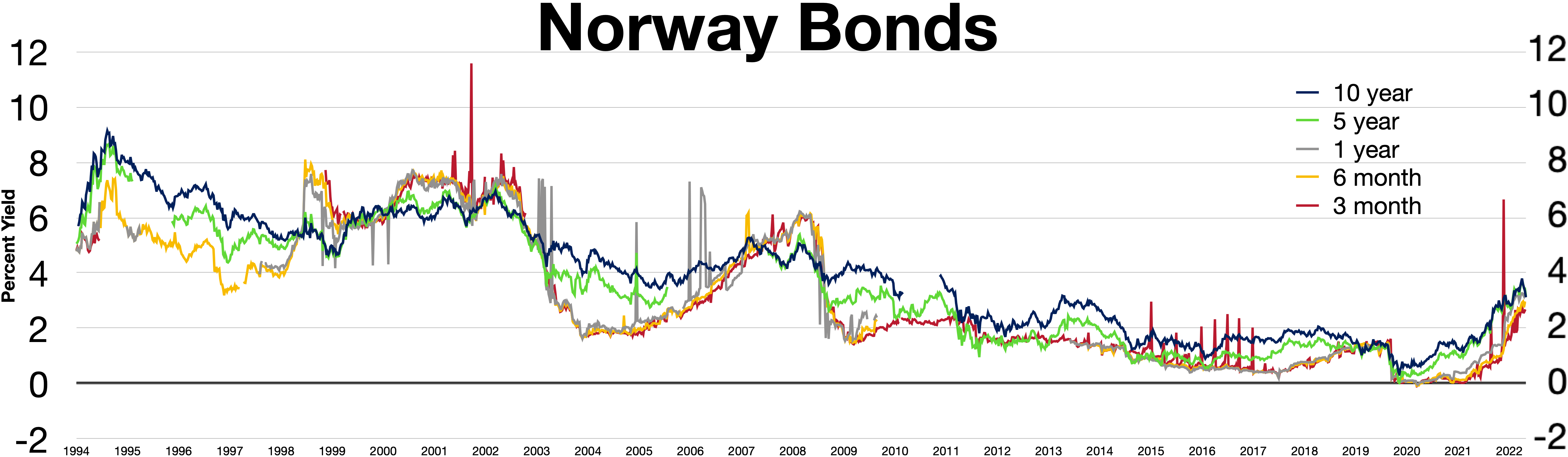
Norway bonds 10 year 5 year 1 year 6 month 3 month

The Norwegian state maintains large ownership positions in key industrial sectors concentrated in natural resources and strategic industries such as the strategic petroleum sector (Equinor), hydroelectric energy production (Statkraft), aluminum production (Norsk Hydro), the largest Norwegian bank (DNB) and telecommunication provider (Telenor). The government controls around 35% of the total value of publicly listed companies on the Oslo stock exchange, with five of its largest seven listed firms partially owned by the state. When non-listed companies are included the state has an even higher share in ownership (mainly from direct oil license ownership). Norway's state-owned enterprises comprise 9.6% of all non-agricultural employment, a number that rises to almost 13% when companies with minority state ownership stakes are included, the highest among OECD countries. Both listed and non-listed firms with state ownership stakes are market-driven and operate in a highly liberalized market economy.

The oil and gas industries play a dominant role in the Norwegian economy, providing a source of finance for the Norwegian welfare state through direct ownership of oil fields, dividends from its shares in Equinor, and licensure fees and taxes. The oil and gas industry is Norway's largest in terms of government revenue and value-added. The organization of this sector is designed to ensure the exploration, development and extraction of petroleum resources result in public value creation for the entire society through a mixture of taxation, licensing and direct state ownership through a system called the State's Direct Financial Interest (SDFI). The SDFI was established in 1985 and represents state-owned holdings in a number of oil and gas fields, pipelines and onshore facilities as well as 67% of the shares in Equinor. Government revenues from the petroleum industry are transferred to the Government Pension Fund of Norway Global in a structure that forbids the government from accessing the fund for public spending; only income generated by the funds' capital can be used for government spending.

The high levels of state ownership have been motivated for a variety of reasons, but most importantly by a desire for national control of the utilization of natural resources. Direct state involvement began prior to the 20th century with the provision of public infrastructure, and expanded greatly into industry and commercial enterprises after the Second World War through the acquisition of German assets in several manufacturing companies. The largest expansion of state ownership occurred with the establishment of Statoil in 1972. Industries and commercial enterprises where the state owns stakes are and market-driven, with marketization extending to public service providers as well as industry.

== Economic structure and sustained growth ==
Exports of Norway by product category (2019) Chemical products Transportation Machines Mineral products Plastics and rubbers Metals Foodstuffs Precious metals Textiles Instruments Animal products Vegetable products Paper goods Footwear and headwear Miscellaneous Stone and glass Wood products Animal and vegetable bi-products Animal hides Arts and antiques Weapons

The emergence of Norway as an oil-exporting country has raised a number of issues for Norwegian economic policy. There has been concern that much of Norway's human capital investment has been concentrated in petroleum-related industries. Critics have pointed out that Norway's economic structure is highly dependent on natural resources that do not require skilled labor, making economic growth highly vulnerable to fluctuations in the demand and pricing for these natural resources. The Government Pension Fund of Norway is part of several efforts to hedge against dependence on petroleum revenue.

Because of the oil boom since the 1970s, there has been little government incentive to help develop and encourage new industries in the private sector, in contrast to other Nordic countries like Sweden and particularly Finland. However the last decades have started to see some incentive on national and local government levels to encourage formation of new "mainland" industries that are competitive internationally. In addition to aspirations for a high-tech industry, there is growing interest in encouraging small business growth as a source of employment for the future. In 2006, the Norwegian government formed nine "centers of expertise" to facilitate this business growth. Later in June 2007, the government contributed to the formation of the Oslo Cancer Cluster (OCC) as a center of expertise, capitalizing on the fact that 80% of cancer research in Norway takes place in proximity to Oslo and that most Norwegian biotechnology companies are focused on cancer.

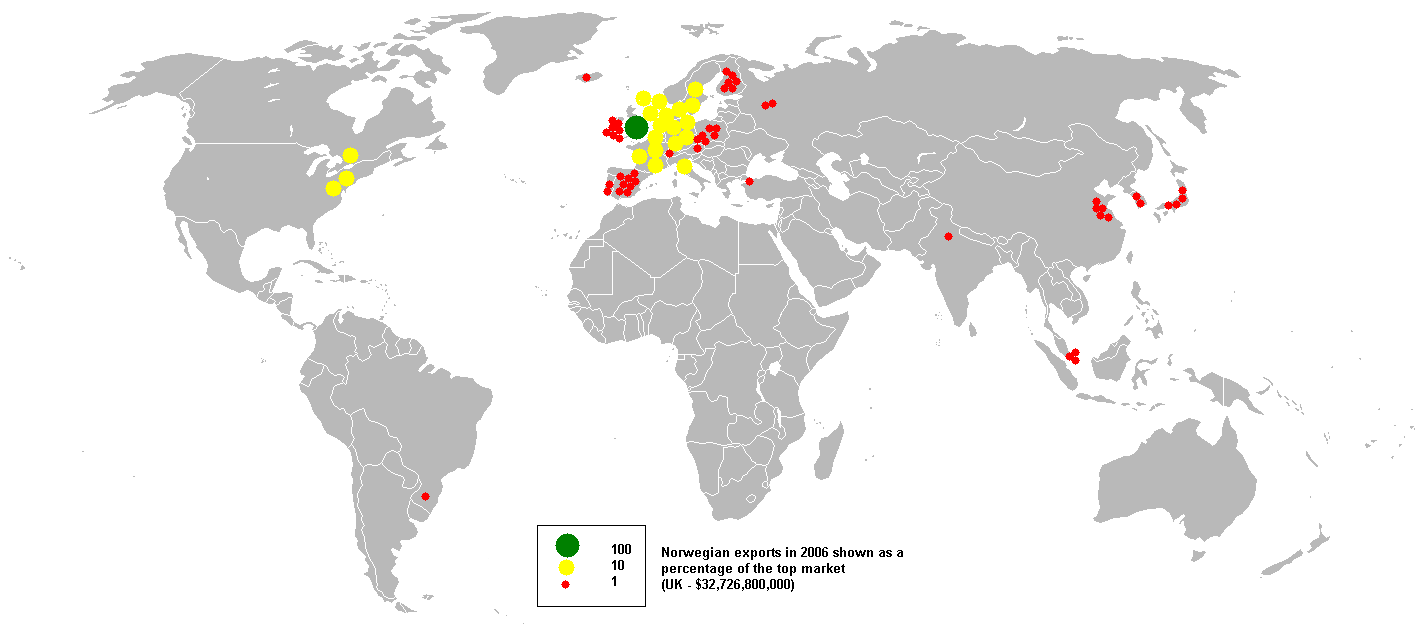
Norwegian exports in 2006

== Macroeconomic statistics ==
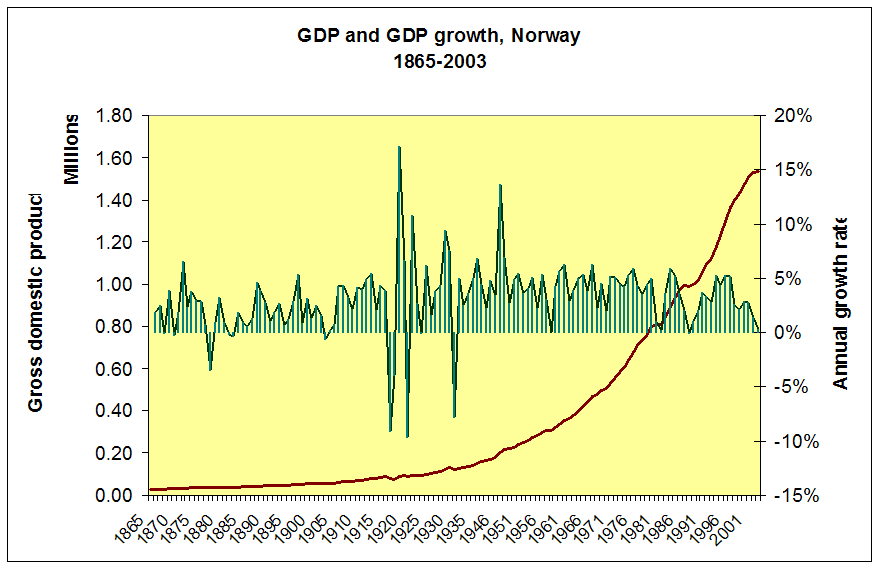
GDP growth (1865–2004)

GDP per capita development in Norway, Iceland, Denmark, Sweden and Finland

The following table shows the main economic indicators in 1980–2025 (with IMF staff estimates in 2026–2031). Inflation under 5% is in green.

Year	GDP (in Bil. US$PPP)	GDP per capita (in US$ PPP)	GDP (in Bil. US$nominal)	GDP per capita (in US$ nominal)	GDP growth (real)	Inflation rate (in Percent)	Unemployment (in Percent)	Government debt (in % of GDP)
1980	54.6	13,353.6	64.2	15,682.1	▲4.5%	▲10.9%	1.7%	47.9%
1981	▲60.8	▲14,808.5	▼63.4	▼15,435.0	▲1.7%	▲13.6%	▲2.0%	▼43.5%
1982	▲64.7	▲15,702.6	▼62.5	▼15,149.2	▲0.2%	▲11.4%	▲2.6%	▼38.6%
1983	▲69.9	▲16,912.0	▼61.4	▼14,855.5	▲3.9%	▲8.4%	▲3.4%	▼35.5%
1984	▲76.8	▲18,535.5	▲61.9	▲14,922.5	▲6.1%	▲6.2%	▼3.1%	▼35.3%
1985	▲83.7	▲20,120.2	▲65.2	▲15,678.9	▲5.6%	▲5.7%	▼2.6%	▲37.0%
1986	▲88.8	▲21,280.3	▲78.4	▲18,792.0	▲4.0%	▲7.2%	▼2.0%	▲46.1%
1987	▲92.6	▲22,059.7	▲93.9	▲22,369.6	▲1.7%	▲8.8%	▲2.1%	▼38.6%
1988	▲95.6	▲22,641.5	▲101.5	▲24,047.7	▼−0.3%	▲6.6%	▲3.1%	▼32.6%
1989	▲100.3	▲23,701.8	▲102.2	▲24,149.4	▲1.0%	▲4.6%	▲4.9%	▼32.5%
1990	▲106.1	▲24,971.9	▲119.3	▲28,082.0	▲2.0%	▲4.1%	▲5.2%	▼29.1%
1991	▲112.9	▲26,404.2	▲121.1	▲28,345.3	▲2.9%	▲3.4%	▲5.5%	▲39.5%
1992	▲119.5	▲27,804.5	▲130.0	▲30,237.7	▲3.6%	▲2.4%	▲5.9%	▲45.3%
1993	▲125.9	▲29,108.1	▼119.8	▼27,710.1	▲2.9%	▲2.3%	5.9%	▲54.0%
1994	▲135.1	▲31,058.4	▲126.3	▲29,050.8	▲5.0%	▲1.4%	▼5.4%	▼51.0%
1995	▲143.6	▲32,863.5	▲151.1	▲34,573.5	▲4.2%	▲2.4%	▼4.9%	▼32.9%
1996	▲153.5	▲34,946.3	▲162.4	▲36,976.6	▲5.0%	▲1.3%	▼4.8%	▼28.6%
1997	▲164.1	▲37,184.8	▼160.0	▼36,257.1	▲5.1%	▲2.5%	▼4.0%	▼26.0%
1998	▲170.5	▲38,390.6	▼153.0	▼34,445.1	▲2.7%	▲2.3%	▼3.2%	▼23.8%
1999	▲176.7	▲39,492.2	▲161.3	▲36,059.3	▲2.2%	▲2.3%	3.2%	▲25.1%
2000	▲186.9	▲41,522.5	▲170.6	▲37,908.6	▲3.4%	▲3.1%	▲3.4%	▲28.8%
2001	▲195.2	▲43,197.4	▲173.6	▲38,410.4	▲2.2%	▲3.0%	▲3.5%	▼27.3%
2002	▲201.2	▲44,235.0	▲195.4	▲42,961.9	▲1.5%	▲1.3%	▲3.9%	▲34.0%
2003	▲207.4	▲45,347.4	▲229.2	▲50,119.5	▲1.1%	▲2.5%	▲4.5%	▲43.1%
2004	▲222.2	▲48,305.6	▲265.7	▲57,762.7	▲4.3%	▲0.5%	4.5%	▲43.8%
2005	▲235.9	▲50,938.8	▲311.4	▲67,234.8	▲3.0%	▲1.5%	▲4.6%	▼42.1%
2006	▲250.1	▲53,541.6	▲349.8	▲74,867.6	▲2.8%	▲2.3%	▼3.4%	▲52.2%
2007	▲265.7	▲56,273.8	▲407.8	▲86,372.2	▲3.4%	▲0.8%	▼2.5%	▼48.9%
2008	▲273.1	▲57,039.7	▲472.1	▲98,612.7	▲0.8%	▲3.7%	▲2.7%	▼46.8%
2009	▼270.3	▼55,816.7	▼395.7	▼81,703.3	▼−1.6%	▲2.2%	▲3.3%	▼41.7%
2010	▲276.3	▲56,301.7	▲440.1	▲89,673.9	▲1.0%	▲2.4%	▲3.8%	▲42.1%
2011	▲285.9	▲57,499.1	▲512.9	▲103,130.1	▲1.4%	▲1.3%	▼3.4%	▼28.9%
2012	▲299.5	▲59,445.4	▲525.1	▲104,221.9	▲2.8%	▲0.7%	▼3.3%	▲30.2%
2013	▲308.5	▲60,528.0	▲540.1	▲105,985.3	▲1.3%	▲2.1%	▲3.8%	▲30.6%
2014	▲320.4	▲62,139.0	▼515.8	▼100,035.8	▲2.1%	▲2.1%	▼3.6%	▼28.8%
2015	▲330.0	▲63,395.6	▼400.7	▼76,971.2	▲2.0%	▲2.2%	▲4.5%	▲33.2%
2016	▲337.4	▲64,247.8	▼383.3	▼72,976.4	▲1.3%	▲3.5%	▲4.7%	▲36.7%
2017	▲352.7	▲66,660.5	▲415.7	▲78,572.8	▲2.7%	▲1.9%	▼4.2%	▲36.9%
2018	▲385.7	▲72,454.3	▲454.6	▲85,386.0	▲1.1%	▲2.7%	▼3.9%	▲38.1%
2019	▲393.8	▲73,507.9	▼424.2	▼79,197.7	▲1.5%	▲2.2%	▼3.7%	▲39.0%
2020	▼375.4	▼69,713.2	▼382.3	▼70,990.3	▼−1.4%	▲1.3%	▲4.6%	▲44.3%
2021	▲499.9	▲92,322.1	▲521.6	▲96,320.6	▲4.1%	▲3.5%	▼4.4%	▼40.1%
2022	▲557.5	▲101,821.5	▲617.3	▲112,747.9	▲4.1%	▲5.8%	▼3.3%	▼34.8%
2023	▲580.4	▲104,894.0	▼502.2	▼90,754.5	▲0.4%	▲5.5%	▲3.6%	▲42.4%
2024	▲603.8	▲108,107.0	▼500.9	▼89,683.5	▲1.4%	▲3.2%	▲4.0%	▲52.8%
2025	▲626.2	▲111,461.7	▲530.1	▲94,360.1	▲1.1%	▲3.0%	▲4.5%	▲54.0%
2026	▲657.3	▲116,168.7	▲651.7	▲115,188.4	▲1.5%	▲3.2%	▲4.6%	▼40.0%
2027	▲687.0	▲120,576.3	▼646.5	▼113,474.0	▲1.3%	▲2.8%	▼4.3%	40.0%
2028	▲709.1	▲123,595.7	▲647.6	▼112,869.6	▲1.1%	▲2.3%	▼4.2%	▼36.5%
2029	▲730.8	▲126,484.9	▲648.1	▼112,166.3	▲1.1%	▲2.0%	▼4.1%	▼33.0%
2030	▲752.9	▲129,399.9	▲651.2	▼111,914.8	▲1.1%	▲2.0%	▼4.0%	▼29.5%
2031	▲774.7	▲132,212.4	▲656.2	▲111,995.5	▲1.1%	▲2.0%	4.0%	▼26.0%

=== Companies ===
In 2022, the sector with the highest number of companies registered in Norway is Services with 296,849 companies followed by Finance, Insurance, and Real Estate with 118,411 companies respectively.

== Agriculture of Norway ==
=== Pest ===
Pesticide usage information for the entire country is available from Statistics Norway.

=== Antimicrobial resistance ===
Overall the risk of antimicrobial resistance in the food supply chains is "negligible". Specifically cattle, milk/dairy products, fish, seafood, drinking water, and pork are considered to be negligible risks. On the other hand, there is a more-than-negligible risk from contact with live pigs (farming and processing them), live poultry, and poultry meat.

== Economic impacts of climate change ==
==== Agriculture ====
A warmer climate will have its pros and cons for the Norwegian agriculture. Higher temperatures combined with new types of plants adapted to the milder climate may yield larger harvests and possibly making two harvests possible per year. The impact of climate change will vary between regions as there are already today a lot of local differences in precipitation etc. An earlier time of snow melting in areas with a dry climate may lead to crops drying out and dying. In wetter regions, further increased precipitation may cause outbreaks of fungus invasion on crops.

==== Forestry ====
The productive forest in Norway is expected to increase considerably due to climate change, but not without complications. Mild winters will reduce the resistance of trees and their frost tolerance. Freeze-thaw cycles will also be more frequent during mild winters, damaging the trees. Pest invasions and diseases are expected to be more frequent as new pests can move rapidly northwards. It is also possible that insects will be able to reproduce one more generation per summer due to higher temperatures, so that for instance the European spruce bark beetle may damage spruce trees with an extra invasion per summer.

== Regional variation ==
	Region	GDP per capita 2015	
	Region	in euros	As % of EU-28 average
European Union		29,000	100%
Norway		46,300	160%
Richest	Oslo and Akershus	51,800	178%
	Agder and Rogaland	40,600	140%
	Vestlandet	39,400	136%
	Trøndelag	35,500	122%
	Nord-Norge	33,500	115%
	Sør-Østlandet	30,000	103%
Poorest	Hedmark and Oppland	29,100	100%

Source: Eurostat

== See also ==
- Economy of Europe
- Nordic model

== References and further reading ==
- Aldridge, Susan (1 June 2008), "Norway's Oncology Efforts are Coalescing", Genetic Engineering & Biotechnology News, Clinical Research & Diagnostics, vol. 28, no. 11, Mary Ann Liebert, Inc., pp. 58, 60, ISSN 1935-472X, OCLC 77706455, archived from the original on 26 April 2012
- Dackling, Martin. "Traditional or modern peasants? odelsrett and bördsrätt in parliamentary debates, 1810–1860" Scandinavian Journal of History 46.1 (2021): 63-83. online
- Eitrheim, Øyvind, Jan Tore Klovland, and Lars Fredrik Øksendal. A monetary history of Norway, 1816–2016 (Cambridge University Press, 2016).
- Grytten, Ola. "Revising growth history: new estimates of GDP for Norway, 1816–2019" Economic History Review (Feb 2022, 75#pp 181–20 excerpt
  - Grytten, Ola Honningdal. "Revising price history: consumer price index for Norway 1492–2018." Scandinavian Economic History Review 68.2 (2020): 129-144. online
- Hutchison, Ragnhild. "Exploring an early cross-border trade system: Norwegian copper in the 18th century." Scandinavian Journal of History 44.3 (2019): 261-286.
- Ikonomou, Haakon A., and Christos Tsakas. "Crisis, capitalism and common policies: Greek and Norwegian responses to common shipping policy efforts in the 1960s and 1970s." European Review of History: Revue européenne d'histoire 26.4 (2019): 636-657. online
- Loftsgarden, Kjetil. "Mass Production and Mountain Marketplaces in Norway in the Viking and Middle Ages." Medieval Archaeology 64.1 (2020): 94-115 online.
- Nelsen, Brent F. "Explaining Petroleum Policy in Britain and Norway, 1962‐90." Scandinavian political studies 15.4 (1992): 307-328. online
- Stenersen, Øivind and Ivar Libæk. History of Norway from the Ice Age to the Oil Age (3rd ed. Dinamo Forlag 2007), ISBN 9788250418523
- Vinje, Victor Condorcet. The Versatile Farmers of the North; The Struggle of Norwegian Yeomen for Economic Reforms and Political Power, 1750–1814 (Nisus Publications, 2014) ).
