= Petoro =

Norwegian state-owned company

Petoro AS
- Company type: State owned
- Industry: Petroleum
- Founded: 2001
- Headquarters: Stavanger, Norway
- Area served: Norway
- Key people: Grethe Moen (CEO); Gunn Wærsted (Chair)
- Revenue: NOK 214,585 billion (2008)
- Operating income: NOK 157,843 billion (2008)
- Net income: NOK 155,420 billion (2008)
- Number of employees: 60+
- Parent: Government of Norway
- Website: http://www.petoro.no/

Petoro is a company that is wholly owned by the Government of Norway. Established in 2001, it manages the Government's portfolio—collectively called State's Direct Financial Interest (SDFI)—of exploration and production licenses for petroleum and natural gas on the Norwegian continental shelf. The company also has a control function surveying Equinor's production on behalf of the Government. Petoro is not an operator of any fields and does not directly own the licenses.

In 2021, Petoro was ranked no. 33 out of 120 oil, gas, and mining companies involved in resource extraction north of the Arctic Circle in the Arctic Environmental Responsibility Index (AERI).
