= Hydro Oil & Gas =

Norwegian Petroleum And Oil Company

- Industry: Petroleum
- Founded: 1965; 61 years ago
- Defunct: 2007; 19 years ago
- Fate: Merged With Statoil To Form StatoilHydro
- Successor: StatoilHydro
- Headquarters: Oslo, Norway
- Products: Petroleum; Natural gas
- Parent: Norsk Hydro

Hydro Oil & Gas was a division of Norsk Hydro that operated within the oil and gas industry. On October 1, 2007 it merged with Statoil to form the new corporation StatoilHydro.

== Operations ==
Hydro's main operations in petroleum were on the Norwegian continental shelf, but also operates in Angola, Canada, Russia and Libya. Hydro was the operator of 13 oil fields and had a production of 563,000 barrels of oil equivalents.

=== Downstream ===
Hydro also operated gas stations in Sweden under the brand name Hydro and operates in Norway and Denmark with the name HydroTexaco in joint venture with Chevron. In 2006 there were 460 stations in Norway and 550 in Denmark. Also the brands Uno-X and Rema Bensin were operated by this venture.

== History ==
In 1965 Hydro joined Elf Aquitaine and six other French companies to form Petronord to perform search for oil and gas in the North Sea. Hydro soon became a large company in the North Sea petroleum industry, and also became operator of a number of fields, the first being Oseberg.

The center-right government under prime minister Per Borten increased the Norwegians States ownership in Hydro to 51% in 1971. This was done under the aegis of establishing a national oil company for Norway. The next year the Labour party won the general election. As a result of this in a unanimous decision in the Storting later that year, Statoil was established as the official national oil company for Norway. Despite this the Norwegian state kept its shares and stakeholder majority in Hydro.

Hydro Oil & Gas was part of a three-company arrangement regarding the extraction of oil on the Norwegian continental shelf. The other parts of this arrangement were Statoil and Saga Petroleum. These companies were given preferential treatment by the Norwegian government in the distribution of oil & gas operating licenses on the Norwegian continental shelf. This preferential treatment largely favored Statoil in the 1970s, but this changed to some degree when Hydro was awarded an operating license in the highly coveted Troll-field. The Troll-field was highly profitable for Hydro and helped finance Hydro's operations during the financial turbulence it experienced during the late 1980s. Hydro's less than stellar financial performance during the late 1980s, Hydro CEO Egil Myklebust steered the company towards a policy of consolidating their business around three core sectors. These sectors were production of oil and gas, metals (especially aluminium) and agriculture. In pursuing this strategy Hydro started to consolidate the corporations key focus area's by selling out assets that didn't belong in the three core sectors and acquiring assets that strengthened them.

Hydro acquired in the late 1980s the Mobil service stations in Norway, Sweden and Denmark, changing their name to Hydro. In 1995 Hydro merged its stations in Norway and Denmark with the Texaco, creating the joint venture HydroTexaco. The service station chain was sold in 2006 to Reitangruppen and the stations changed name to YX Energi. In 1999 Hydro acquired Norway's third largest petroleum company Saga Petroleum, who had major upstream operations primarily in Norway and the United Kingdom. The British operations were later sold. This acquisition marked the end of the three-company arrangement and was thus seen as politically controversial at the time. Politicians from especially the Norwegian Conservative party reacted to the partly state-owned company acquiring a wholly private company without the approval from Norwegian regulators. The Saga acquisition proved in time to be a sound investment on Hydro's part. Hydro has bought Saga at a time when the Oil price was at one of its lowest points during the 1990s and the consistent rise in the Oil price ensured steady profits from the investment.

The merger proposal with Statoil was announced in December 2006. Under the rules of the EEA the merger was approved by the European Union on May 3, 2007 and by the Norwegian Parliament on June 8, 2007. The Norwegian Government, the biggest shareholder in both Statoil and Norsk Hydro, holds 62.5% of the company. Jens Stoltenberg, the Prime Minister of Norway commented that he views the merger as "the start of a new era. We are creating a global energy company and strengthening Norway's oil and gas industry."
