= Lerkendal Stadion =

Football stadium at Lerkendal in Trondheim, Norway

Lerkendal
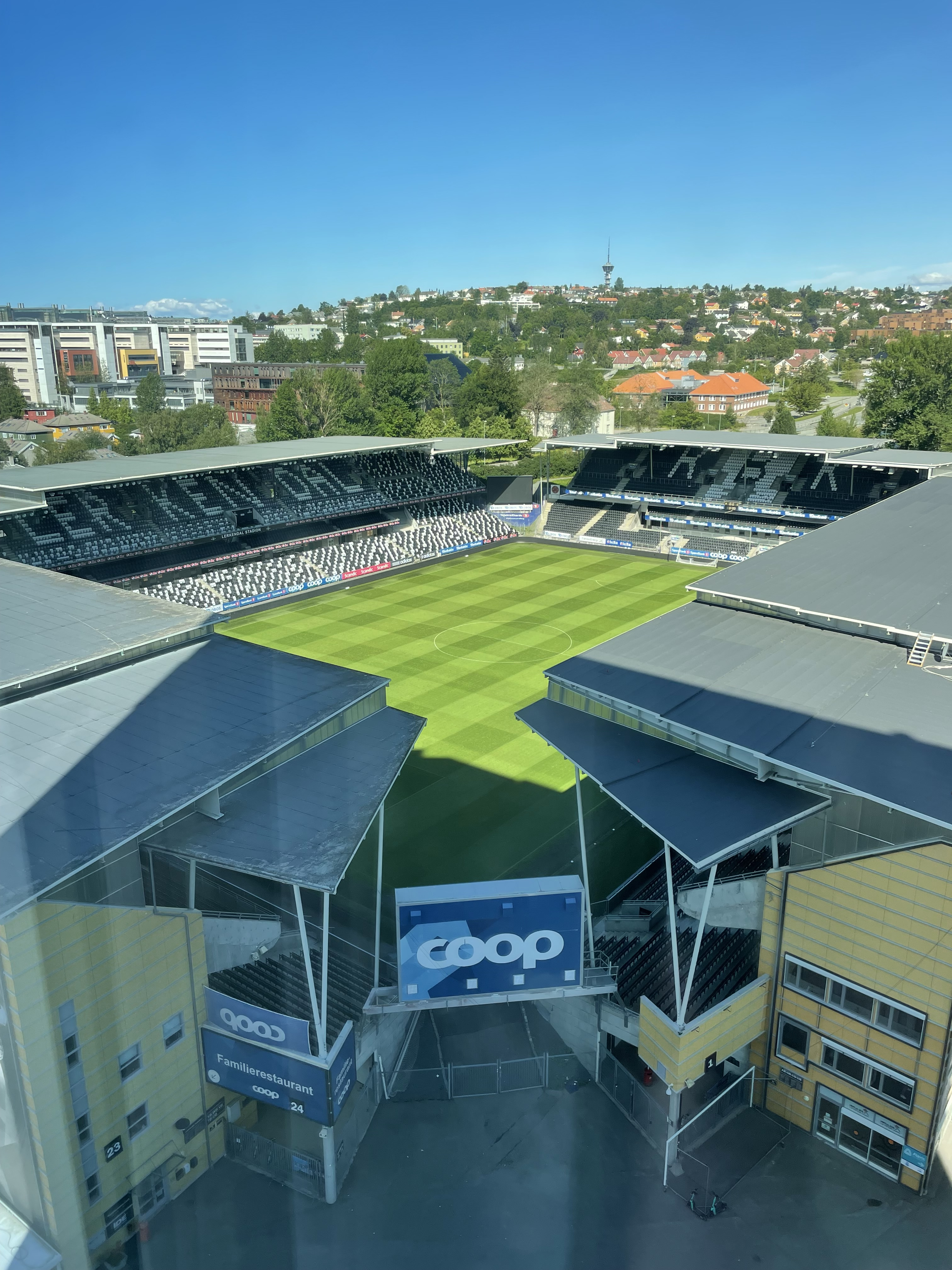
- UEFA
- Interactive map of Lerkendal
- Full name: Lerkendal Stadion
- Location: Trondheim, Norway
- Coordinates: 63°24′44″N 10°24′16″E
- Owner: Rosenborg BK
- Operator: Lerkendal Stadion AS
- Capacity: 21,423
- Surface: Desso GrassMaster
- Record attendance: 28,569
- Field size: 105 m × 68 m (115 yd × 74 yd)

Construction
- Groundbreaking: 1947
- Opened: 10 August 1947
- Renovated: 1949, 1961–1963, 1968, 1996, 2000–2002
- Cost: NOK 335 million (1996–2002)

Tenants
- SK Freidig (1947–1964); FK Kvik (1947–2000); Rosenborg BK (1957–present); Strindheim IL (1984, 1995)

The Lerkendal Stadion (Urban East Norwegian: [ˈlæ̂rkn̩dɑːɫ ˈstɑ̀ːdɪɔn]) is an all-seater association football stadium located at Lerkendal in Trondheim, Norway. The home ground of the Eliteserien (2017) side Rosenborg BK, it has a capacity for 21,405 spectators, making it the second-largest football stadium in the country.

Lerkendal opened as a multi-purpose stadium on 10 August 1947, as the main football and athletics stadium in Trondheim. Originally the venue was mostly used by the football teams SK Freidig and FK Kvik, and Rosenborg did not become a tenant until 1957. A new grandstand with roof was completed in 1962, and floodlights were installed in 1968. The oldest of the current stands were built in 1996, along with new lighting. Three more grandstands were built between 2000 and 2002, which also saw the removal of the athletics facilities and the sale of the stadium from Trondheim Municipality to Rosenborg. Further expansions plans have been launched, to increase capacity by filling in the corners and possibly by building a retractable roof.

The record attendance of 28,569 dates from the decisive Tippeligaen match against Lillestrøm in 1985. Ten international matches were held at Lerkendal between 1951 and 1990. One domestic cup final has been held at Lerkendal; the Women's Cup Final in 1986.

== History ==
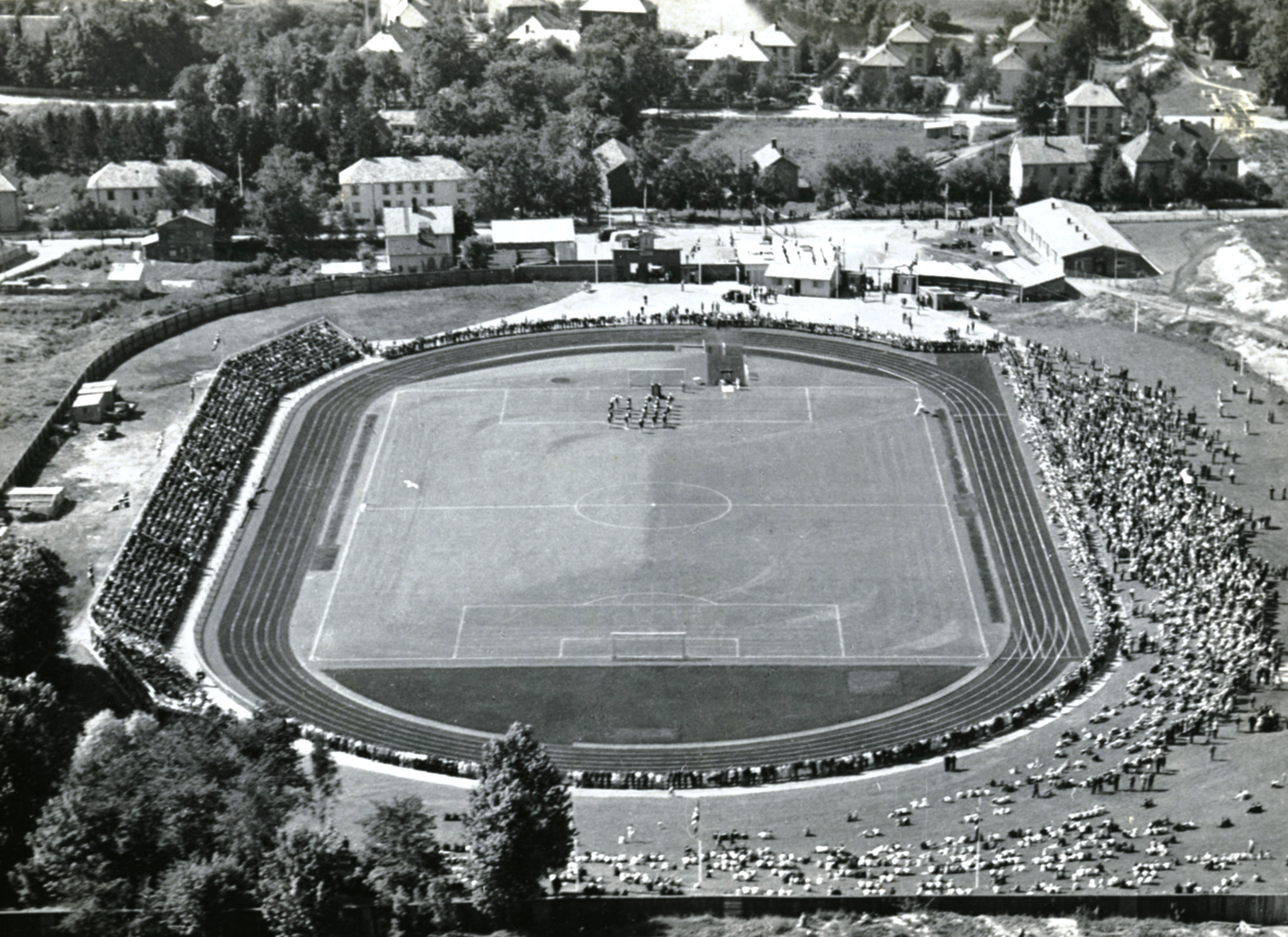
The opening of the stadium on 10 August 1947.

Construction of Lerkendal started as a public works during the 1930s, as a measure to create jobs. It opened on 10 August 1947, and consisted of a main grass field, two gravel fields, two handball courts and two tennis courts. The main field had a spectator capacity for 37,000 on temporary stands, making it the second-largest stadium in the country. The long sides consisted of temporary wooden stands, with seating on the south stand and standing places on terraces on the north stand. The end sides of the stadium consisted of grass embankments at a 30 percent angle, allowing for standing space for spectators without having to build stands. Changing rooms were located in a nearby German-built barracks dating from the Second World War.

The venue hosted significant motorcycle speedway events from 1952 to 1956. It staged a qualifying round of the Speedway World Championship in 1955 and the finals of the Norwegian Individual Speedway Championship in 1952 and 1953. Other speedway events also took place during the period.

The first major rebuilding of the venue took place ahead of the 1962 season, when the wooden stands were torn and replaced with concrete stands on both long sides. On the south side, a wave-shaped roof was built; originally designed to be self-supporting, the contractor, Reinertsen, did not trust their own calculations and made a last-minute decision to install support columns. The new stands were taken into use on 3 May 1962. Floodlighting was installed in 1968 to allow UEFA club tournament matches to be held at the venue. An all-weather running track was subsequently also laid. On 1 December 1988, Lerkendal Station opened, allowing train passengers a short walk to the stadium. In 1994, the first pitch with Desso GrassMaster was laid.

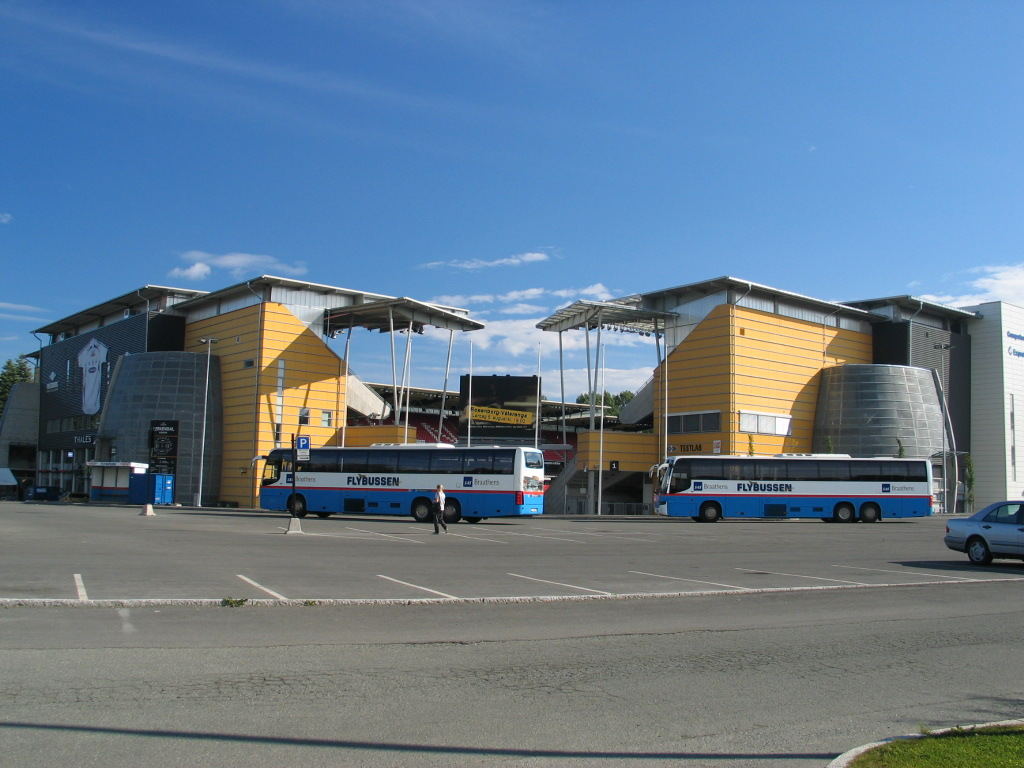
Exterior view of the Rema Stand (left) and EiendomsMegler1 Stand (right).

By the time Rosenborg had qualified for the 1995–96 UEFA Champions League, UEFA had for security reasons introduced restrictions which reduced Lerkendal's capacity to 12,200 spectators. In addition, a total ban on standing places would be introduced from 1997. In 1995, a debate arose between Rosenborg and Trondheim Municipality regarding the construction of a new grandstand, to be located on the north side of the stadium. Rosenborg's Nils Skutle stated that if it was not built ahead of the 1997–98 season, Rosenborg would only be allowed to sell 2,800 tickets to their home Champions League matches, and that they instead would be forced to play their games at Ullevaal Stadion in Oslo. The new grandstand cost 32 million, and opened in 1996 season. The upgrades also included a new floodlight and public announcement system.

Rosenborg started laying plans for further construction, at first looking at construction of a new grandstand on the east end. In May 1998, Lerkendal Eiendom AS, owned 44% by Rosenborg, was established to build three new grandstands, including removing the running track to make it a football-only stadium. An alternative was to move and build an all-new stadium at Ranheim. Following the announcement of the Ranheim plans, Mayor Anne Kathrine Slungård stated that she did not want to sell Lerkendal, as she wanted public ownership of cultural infrastructure. In April 1999, Trondheim Municipality's chief of administration, Knut Sæther, recommended that the municipality sell Lerkendal to Rosenborg, who would then along with private investors be free to construct the necessary facilities. At the time, the municipality estimated the value of Lerkendal to between NOK 50 and 100 million. The football district stated they were in favor of conversion of Lerkendal, and that they feared that if Rosenborg moved Lerkendal would incur high costs on the municipality, giving Granåsen as an example of a little used skiing facility which used half the municipal funding for sports venues.

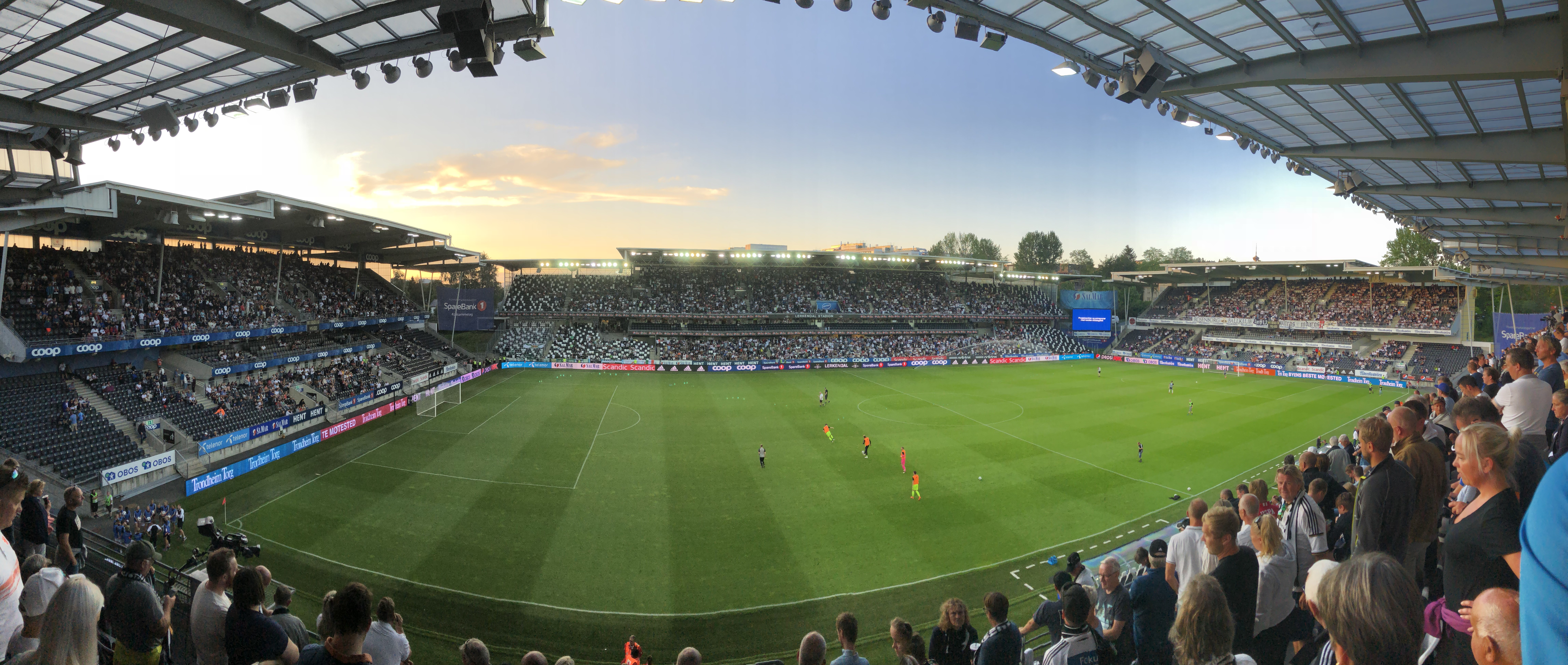
A panorama picture of Lerkendal in August 2018.

On 5 October 1999, the club and the municipality signed a letter of intent which indicated that the two would cooperate constructing a new venue along with private investors. The final contract was made with Reinertsen on 20 April 2000, and other involved investors included Fokus Bank, Gjensidige NOR, I. K. Lykke, Eiendomspar, Siemens and Trondheims Næringsbygg. The club received a 47% share of the stadium company, while the municipality received 14% in exchange for the company taking over the ownership of the land and existing structure. As compensation for losing Lerkendal as an athletics venue, the municipality spent NOK 32 million upgrading Øya stadion as the city's new main athletics stadium. NOK 20 million was financed by Rosenborg, while the remainder was spent using public funds.

Construction of the end stands started in January 2001, and they were completed in November. The demolition of the 1962 stand started on 24 October 2001, and the new stand was completed on 30 September 2002. The cost of constructing the new Lerkendal, including all four stands from 1996 to 2002, was NOK 335 million, of which NOK 253 million was for the 2001 and 2002 work. To give optimal conditions for the turf, the corners were not built out and the south stand was built with a transparent roof. However, the harsh climate forced the turf to be replaced two years later. In a 2012 survey carried out by the Norwegian Players' Association among away-team captains, Lerkendal was found to be the league's second-best stadium, with a score of 4,40 on a scale from one to five.

== Facilities ==
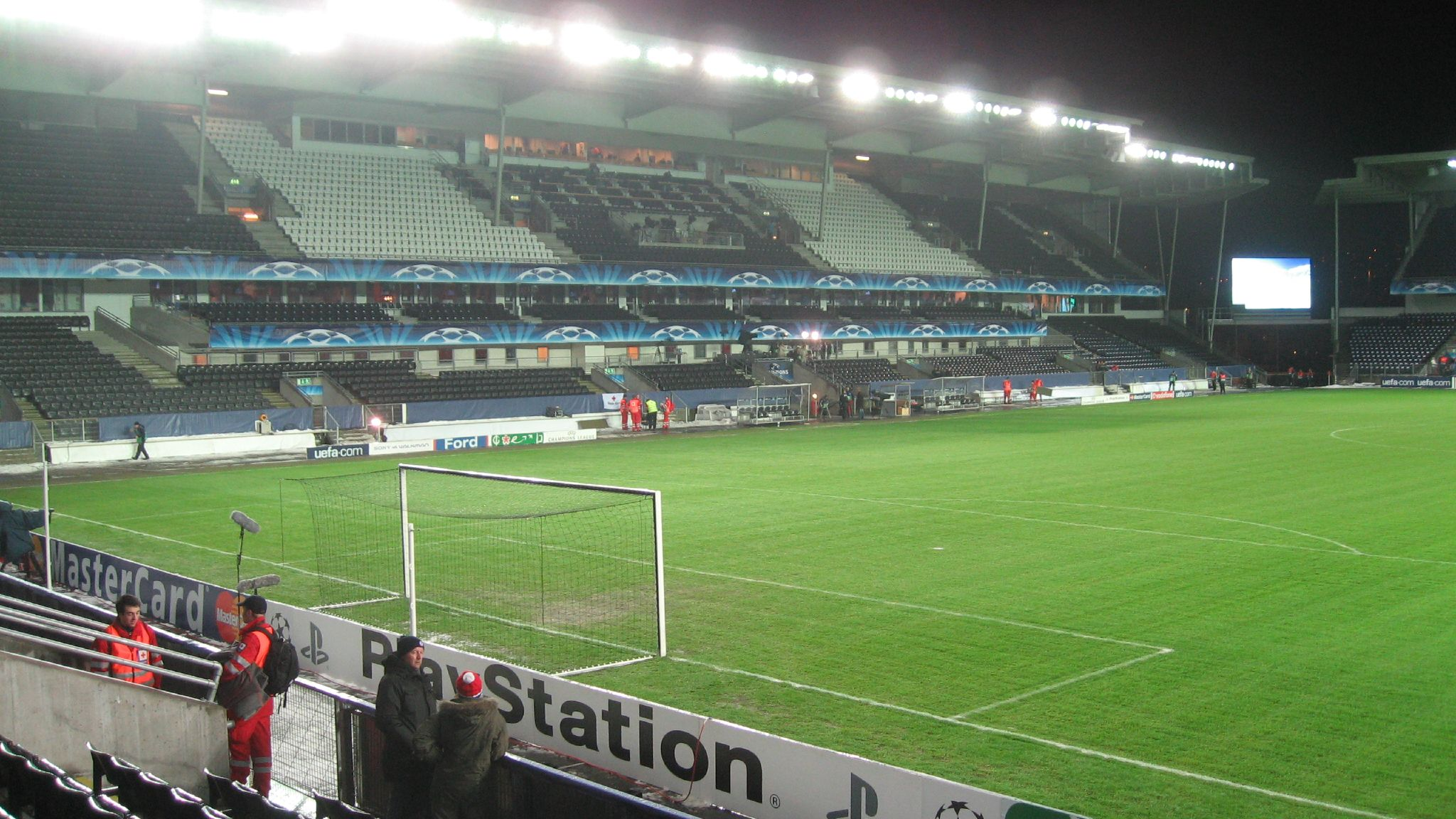
The EiendomsMegler1 Stand was built in 2002.

Lerkendal Stadion consists of four, three-tier grandstand without corners. The stadium has a capacity for 21,405 spectators, of which 1,338 are in club seating and luxury boxes on the center tier of all four stands. The Hent Stand on the north side of the pitch, built in 1996, is the largest and the only to have red seats. It holds a capacity of 7,457 spectators. Originally named the Adidas Stand, it was renamed before the 2013-season. Opposite lies the EiendomsMegler1 Stand, which was completed in 2002. In addition to change rooms and an honor stand, it has a capacity for 6,194 spectators. The Rema Stand to the west, opened in 2001, houses the supporter shop, a pizza restaurant and commercial offices. The upper tier has since its opening been used as a family tier. While the lower tier was used by Kjernen, Rosenborg's singing supporters. Since Kjernen in 2009 moved to the upper tier of the opposite Adressa Stand, the whole Rema Stand has been used as a family stand. The Adressa Stand opened at the same time, and both have a seating capacity for 3,810 people. The latter hosts office space for Rosenborg Arena and the football district, as well as change rooms for the training pitch. The upper tier is used by Kjernen, Rosenborg's supporter club. The lower tier was earlier used by the away fans. But after Kjernen's move to the upper tier, the away fans was moved to the western end of the Hent stand. The pitch has Desso GrassMaster, a natural grass pitch with artificial fibers sown in for increase strength. This includes an automatic watering system and a built-in heating 25 centimeters (9.8 in) below the surface.

The stadium is part of Lerkendal idrettspark, which also consists of three training pitches, two in full size and of which one has artificial turf. The main training pitch is the natural grass Skoglunden, while the artificial turf venue is Lerkendal kunstgress. The two pitches both have flood lighting, heating and are often used for matches by Rosenborg's recruit and reserve teams. The team has a health club located within the south stand. The club's offices are located in Brakka, a German-built barracks dating from World War II.

The stadium is located at Lerkendal, 3 kilometers (2 mi) south of the city center. It is located on the southern main road into town, with good bus service. In addition, it is located next to Lerkendal Station, the southern terminus of the Trøndelag Commuter Rail. Parking near the stadium is very limited, and ad-hoc park and ride are established on matchdays at Stavset and City Syd.

== Events ==
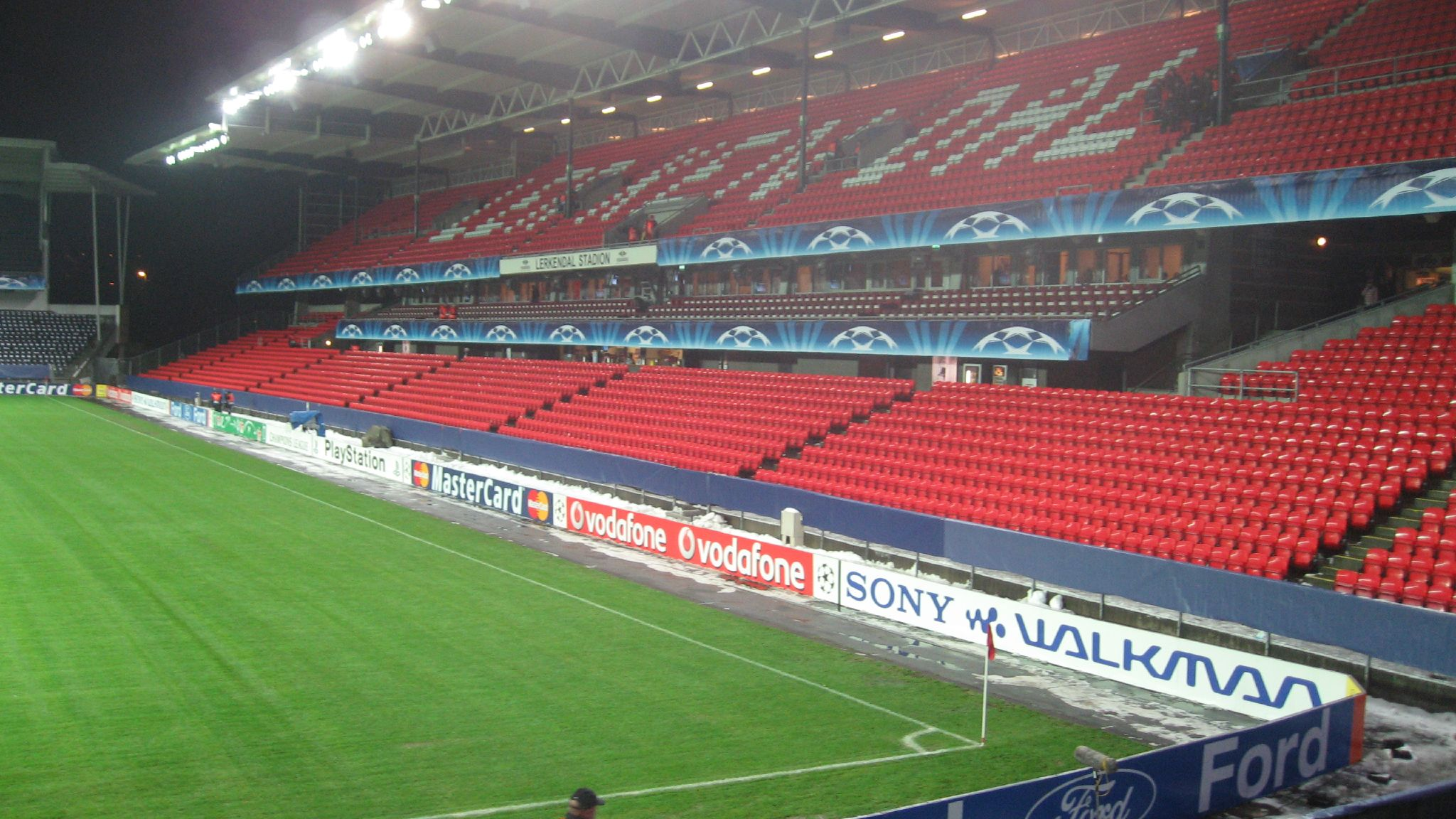
The Hent Stand was built in 1996 and is the oldest remaining part of the stadium.

The venue was opened with a friendly football match between the Trondheim city team and the Vestfold county team, which Trondheim won 4–3. The opening, attended by 8,000 spectators, also saw several track and field events. The original main football tenants were SK Freidig and FK Kvik. The latter played in the Main League in 1951–52 and 1955–56, and otherwise remained in the Second Division throughout most of the 1950s and 60s. A record 18,000 spectators watched Freidig lose the 1948 Norwegian Football Cup semifinal against Viking. On 18 October 1950, Lerkendal hosted a friendly between Kvik and Spartak Moscow.

Lerkendal hosted its first international on 26 June 1951, when Norway beat Iceland 3–1. On 28 August 1953 it hosted a B international game against Finland. Later national games consist of 5–0 against Malta on 3 July 1962, 2–0 against Finland on 20 August 1964, 4–2 against Luxembourg on 27 May 1965, with the record international audience of 22,319, 2–1 against Iceland on 21 July 1969, 0–1 against Denmark on 23 September 1973, 2–0 against West Germany on 26 September 1979, 1–0 against Wales on 6 June 1984, 1–0 against Bulgaria on 26 May 1987. and 1–2 against Denmark on 6 June 1990, The Football Association of Norway no longer plays international matches elsewhere than Ullevaal Stadion because of the conditions in its sponsorship agreements. On 26 May 1977, the Norway national under-21 football team lost 2–3 against Sweden at Lerkendal.

Rosenborg took Lerkendal into use from the 1957–58 season, when they were promoted to the Regional League. The season ended in relegation and Rosenborg played the following season at their old home ground, Rosenborgbanen. With the promotion ahead of the 1959–60 season, Rosenborg returned to Lerkendal and have remained there since. In 1959, Lerkendal was the venue of a neutral quarter final in the cup between Nessegutten from Levanger and Viking, which attracted 25,043 spectators, mostly from Innherred, setting a new stadium record. From the 1960–61 season, Rosenborg established itself in the Main League.

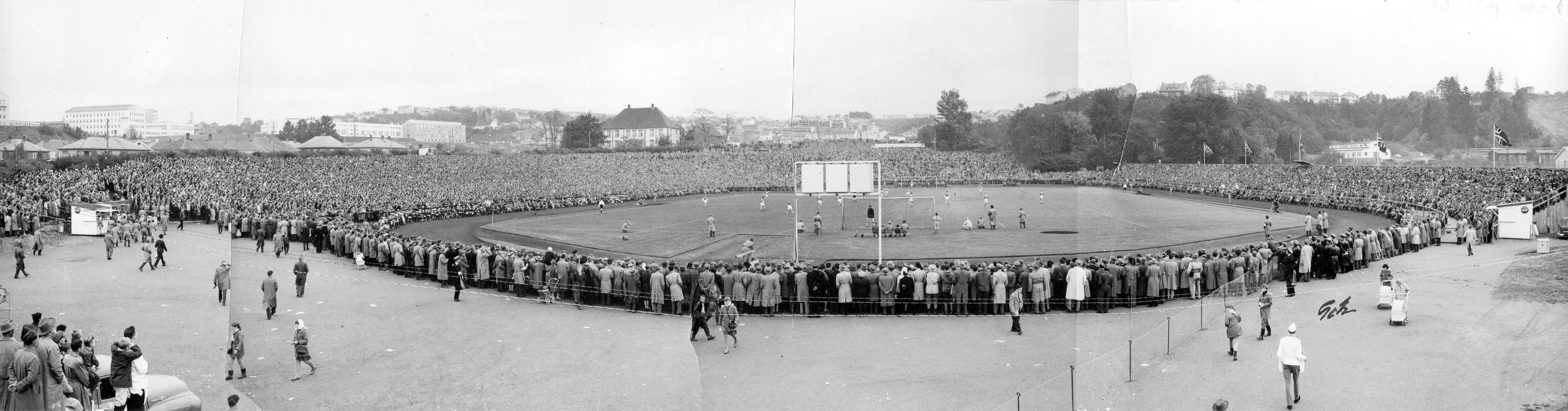
27 September 1959 quarter final between Nessegutten and Viking, which attracted 25,043 spectators.

The opening game of the new stands on 3 May 1962 was a Rosenborg friendly against Dunfermline Athletic. Freidig moved to Eberg idrettsanlegg when it was completed ahead of the 1965 season. A new stadium spectator record was set in the cup semifinal against Brann in 1967, which was watched by 25,551 people. Rosenborg qualified for the 1968–69 European Cup and met SK Rapid Wien in the first round. The game was spectated by 22,492 and remains the record for UEFA tournaments. Per-season average attendance for Rosenborg's league matches lay between five and ten thousand people during the 1970s and early 1980s, with an all-time low of 2,549 in 1978, when Rosenborg played in the Second Division. The venue hosted the Norwegian Athletics Championships four times, in 1963, 1967, 1973 and 1983. Lerkendal hosted the Women's Cup Final in 1986, where Sprint-Jeløy beat Trondheims-Ørn. Strindheim IL played in the top division in 1984 and 1995, both times playing their home games at Lerkendal. Kvik remained at Lerkendal until the upgrades started in 2000, after which they moved to Øya stadion. Bodø/Glimt played their home game in the 1999–2000 UEFA Cup against Werder Bremen at Lerkendal, attracting 1,425 spectators.

The official all-time record at Lerkendal is the final game of the 1985 season, when Rosenborg won the league in the last game against Lillestrøm in a league final which attracted 28,569. Starting with Rosenborg's success in the late 1980s, attendance rose and lay between eleven and thirteen thousand until 2001. After the opening of the new stadium in 2002, attendance again rose, peaking at an average 19,903 in 2007, although it has fallen somewhat since. The high of most seasons is the 16 May game held every year: the 1994 edition against Tromsø saw 27,661 spectators, and in 1985 as many as 30,000 may have seen the game, as the gates were opened. Since the opening of the current stadium, the attendance record is 22,330, set in the 2006 edition against Odd Grenland. Between 1995 and 2007, Rosenborg played 11 seasons and 37 home matches in UEFA Champions League. The venue has been used for numerous concerts, including A-ha, Iron Maiden and Kiss.

== Attendance ==
Attendance
Season	Avg	Min	Max	Rank	Ref
2018	16,424	13,668	21,201	1	
2019	12,704	10,040	17,799	3	

== Future ==
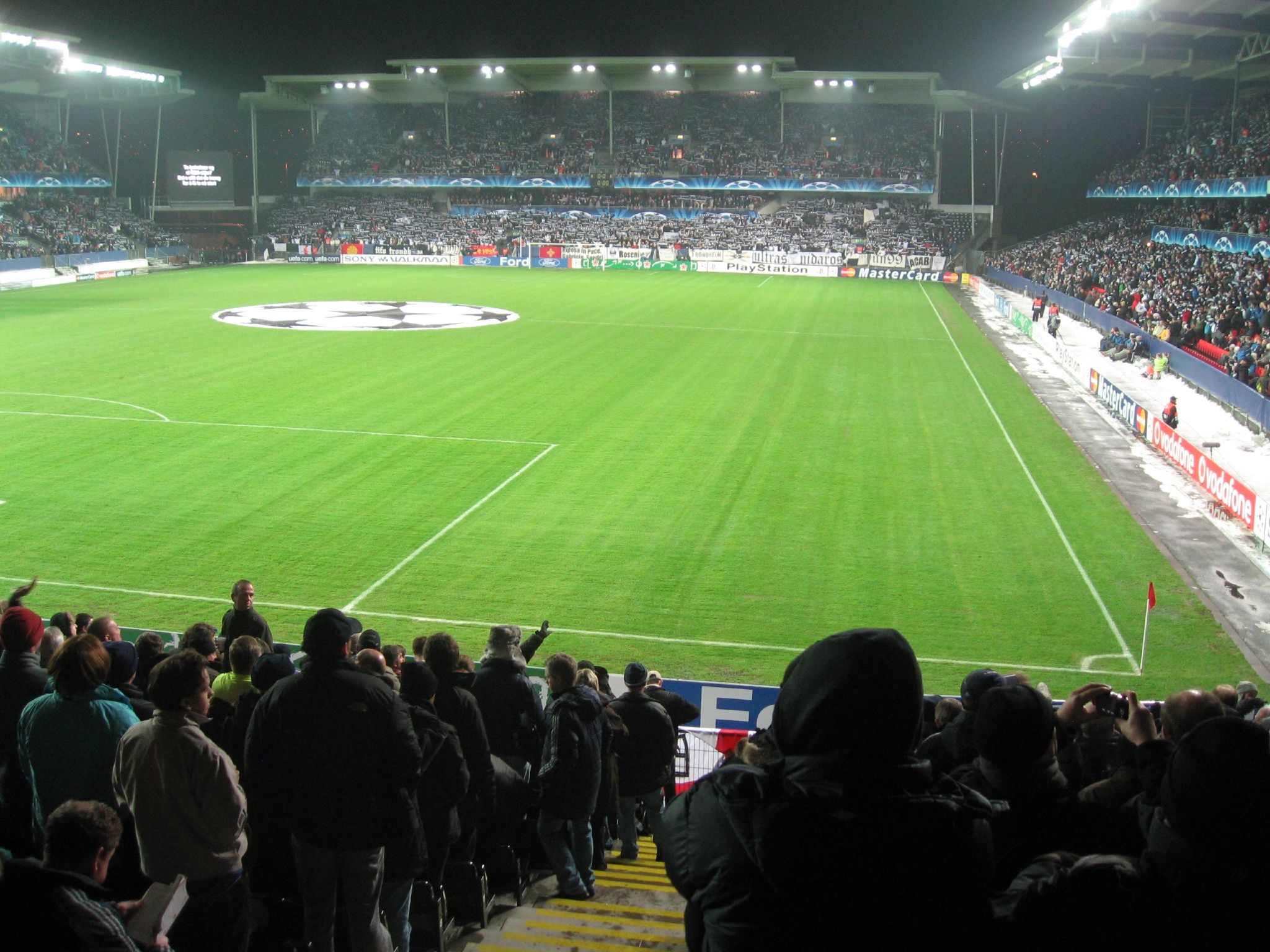
Lerkendal during a Rosenborg home UEFA Champions League match against Chelsea in 2007.

Ahead of the failed Nordic bid to host the Euro 2008, Lerkendal was, along with Ullevaal Stadion, proposed as Norwegian venues. To reach the required spectator capacity of 30,000 seats, the plans called for the roof of the Adidas stand to be removed to allow for a temporary third tier. Additional seating would be created by adding a single row at the bottom of the four stands, and building capacity in the corners. The proposal would have given a spectator capacity of 30,849, although it would have been reduced after the championship by removing the extra tier. Similar plans were launched for the Norwegian–Swedish bid for Euro 2016, where the cost of the stadium upgrades was estimated at NOK 800 million. In 2007, the club management stated that they wanted to sell out all matches before they made further expansions to the stadium, independent of the plans to host the Euro. Construction of stands in the corners could give 4,000 additional seats, although these would be the most costly to build and at the same time give the worst view of the pitch. Construction could be done by first building two of the corners. Since then, Rosenborg has experienced a significant drop in attendance. The failed Trondheim bid for the 2018 Winter Olympics, launched in 2007, called for Lerkendal to be the Olympic Stadium and host the opening and closing ceremonies.

Rosenborg had originally planned to build additional commercial facilities and a tower hotel during the 2002 construction, but this was canceled. At the 2011 annual meeting, the plans were again launched by Skutle, who stated that construction might start as early as 2011. In March 2005, Rosenborg announced plans to build a retractable roof over the pitch and lay artificial turf. The roof was estimated to cost NOK 100 million, and the club estimated that it could generate NOK 30 million per year in increased revenue from concerts and events. By 2007, the roof plans were delayed, with management stating that it would be necessary to complete the construction of all stands before a roof was built, and that they believed the stadium would soon be expanded.

On 19 September 2014, Lerkendal was awarded the right to host the 2016 UEFA Super Cup, marking the first time a Norwegian stadium would host a European final.

== See also ==
- List of football stadiums in Norway
- Lists of stadiums

Preceded by Boris Paichadze Dinamo Arena; Tbilisi	UEFA Super Cup; Match venue 2016	Succeeded by Philip II Arena; Skopje
