= Ole Robert Reitan =

Norwegian businessperson (born 1971)

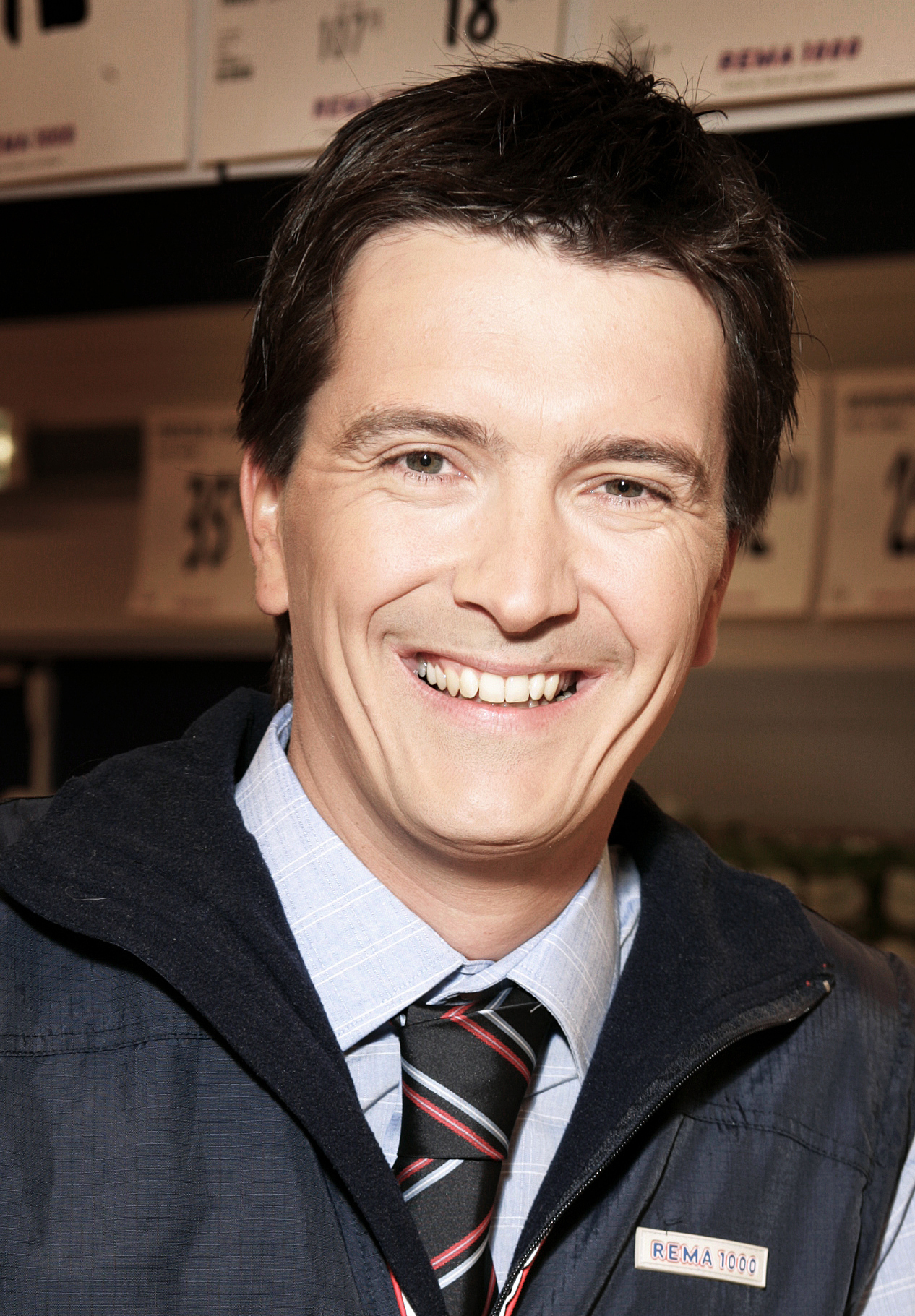
- Reitan in 2006
- Born: 5 October 1971 (age 54)
- Occupation: merchant
- Parent: Odd Reitan

Ole Robert Reitan (born 5 October 1971) is a Norwegian businessman. He is a son of merchant Odd Reitan, and co-owner of REITAN AS, along with his father and brother. He is the CEO of Reitan Retail, which includes the business areas REMA 1000 Norway, REMA 1000 Denmark, Reitan Convenience and Uno-X Mobility. Ole Robert Reitan has been director of Reitan Narvesen and of the franchise supermarket chain Rema 1000.
