= Hydro (fuel-station chain) =

Former Swedish fuel station chain

- Company type: Fuel station
- Number of locations: 500
- Area served: Sweden
- Owner: StatoilHydro
- Website: www.norskhydro.se

Hydro was a chain of fuel stations throughout Sweden owned by Statoil. The chain had more than 500 stations, as well as some unmanned Uno-X stations. The company also operated in retailing natural gas, electricity and heating oil.

== History ==
The Hydro chain was created in the 1980s–early 1990s when Norsk Hydro bought the Mobil stations in Norway, Sweden, and Denmark to transform itself to a vertically integrated petroleum company. The stations were rebranded Hydro in all three countries. In 1994 the Norwegian and Danish stations were converted to Hydro Texaco when Hydro merged its stations in the two countries with Texaco's stations. In 2007 the ownership of Hydro was transferred to StatoilHydro when Norsk Hydro's oil and gas division merged with Statoil. When StatoilHydro was renamed Statoil in November 2009, the use of the Hydro-brand was discontinued, and ownership of 198 filling stations was transferred to St1.
