= Grans Brewery =

Brewery in Sandefjord, Norway

Coordinates: 59°07′47″N 10°14′31″E

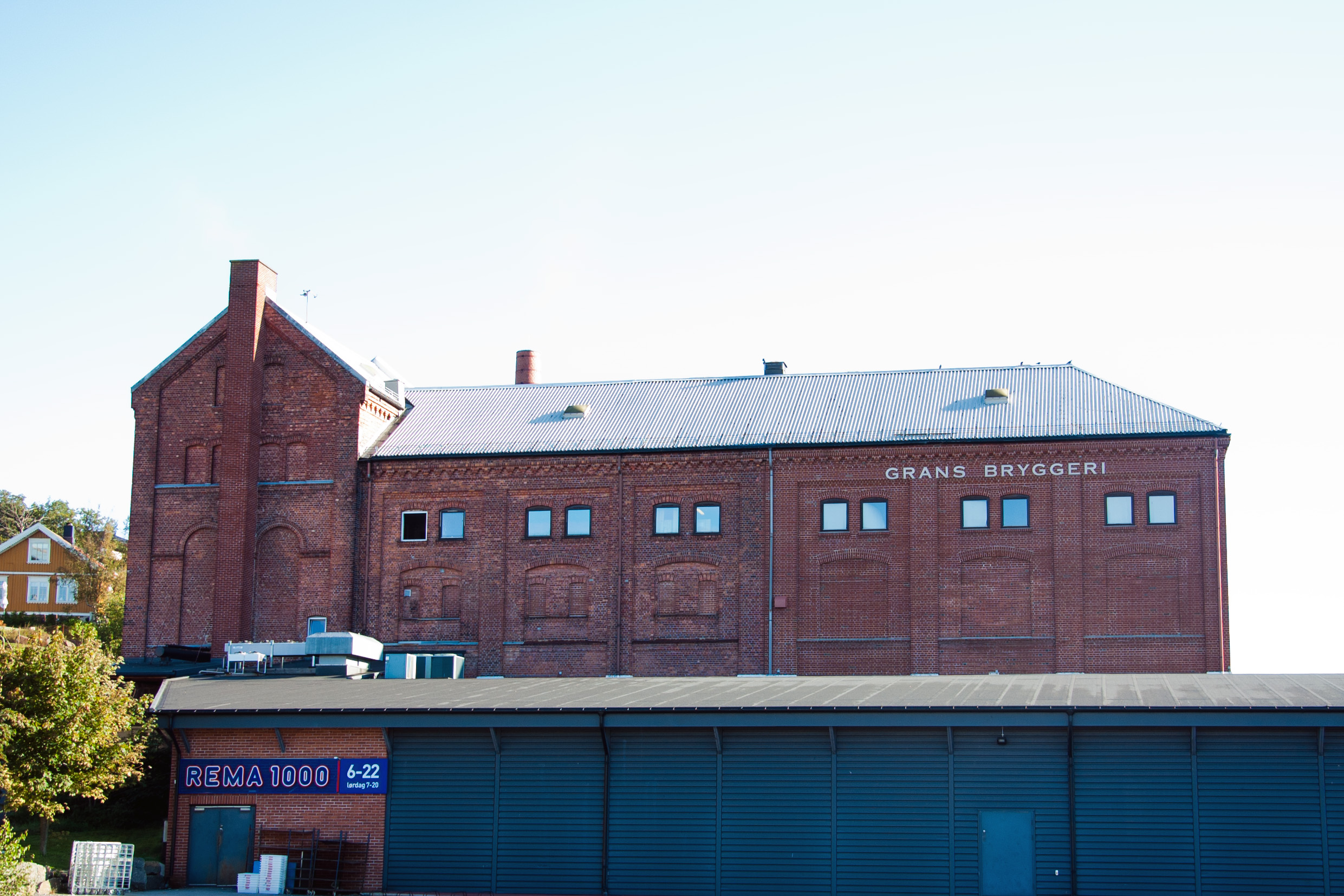
- Grans Brewery with a REMA 1000 store in front.
- Type: Aksjeselskap
- Industry: Beverages
- Founded: 1899; 127 years ago
- Founder: Jørgen Martin Osmundsen
- Headquarters: Sandefjord, Norway
- Area served: Norway, Denmark
- Key people: Guttorm Gran
- Products: Beers, ciders, soft drinks, bottled water
- Number of employees: 57 (2005)
- Website: www.grans.no

The Grans Brewery (Grans Bryggeri AS) is a brewery founded in 1899 in Sandefjord, Norway. The name was Sandefjord Bryggeri og Mineralvandfabrik A/S until 1965. After two generations of Guttorm Gran (senior and junior) in the management, Trygve Christophersen was employed as CEO in 2001.

In 2019, the brewery sold 55 million liters of drinks, which was a four percent increase from 2018. 80 percent of their production consists of soda and mineral water, while beer and other alcoholic beverages make up 20 percent of the production. As of 2020, Grans is the fifth-largest brewery in Norway.

It distributes most of its products domestically through the REMA 1000 chain stores.

The brewery was not a member of Norwegian Brewers & Soft Drank Association ("Den norske bryggeriforening") from 1965 to 1996. It withdrew in 1966 in order to compete outside its designated sales area. The organization organized a nationwide boycott of Grans products following their decision to withdraw.

== Facts ==
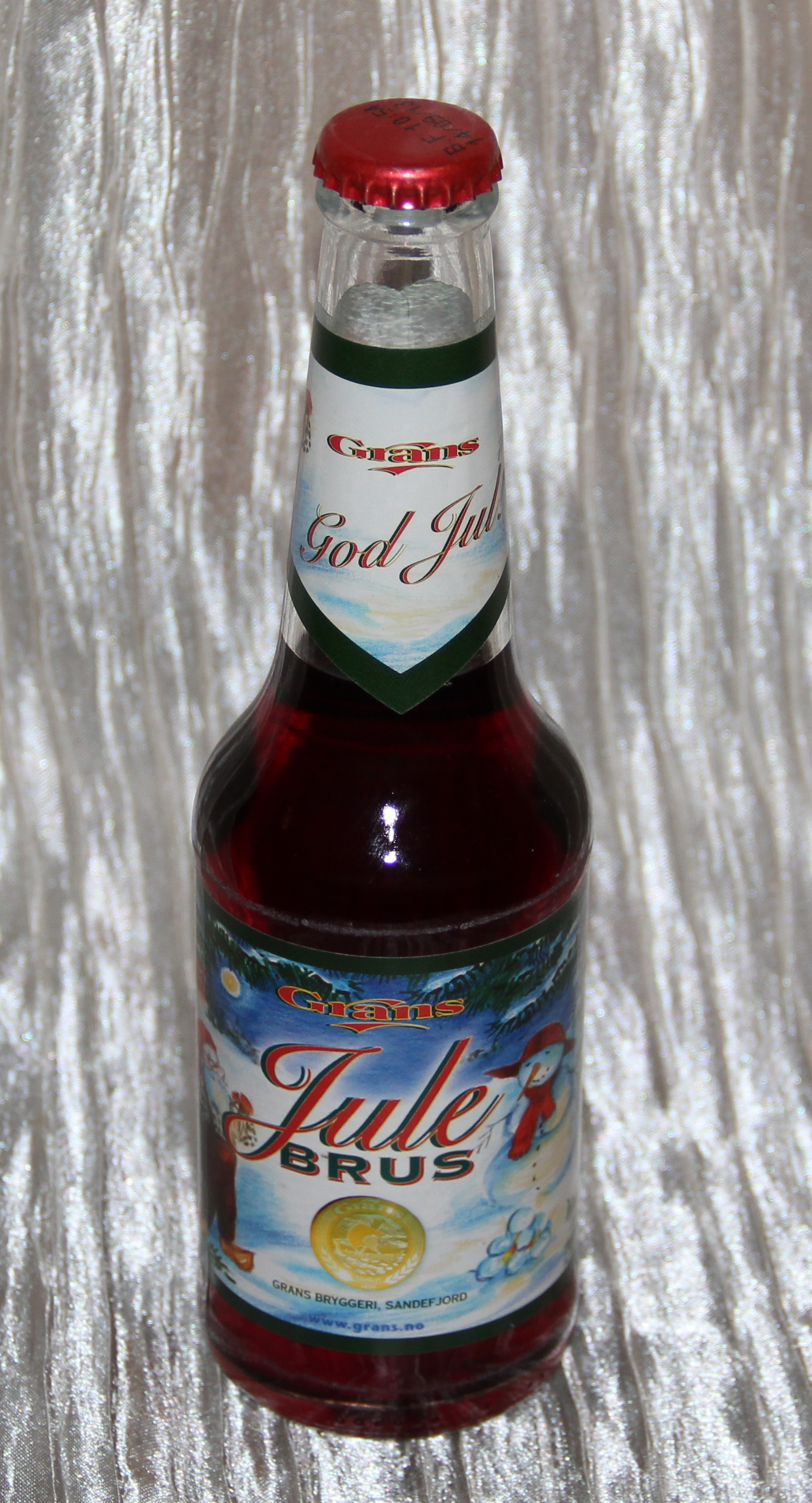
Seasonal red Christmas soda from Grans.

- Owners are Guttorm Gran Jr. and Reitangruppen (50% each)
- 57 employees (2005)
- Approximately 18 million liters beer and 18 million liters soft drinks produced in 2004
- Turnover 151 million NOK (2004)
- Distribution deal with the store chain REMA 1000

=== Names ===
Some former names for the brewery have been:

- Sandefjord Bryggeri og Mineralvandfabrik A/S (1899-1949)
- Sandefjords Bryggeri (1949-1966)
- Grans Bryggeri AS (1965-)

== History ==
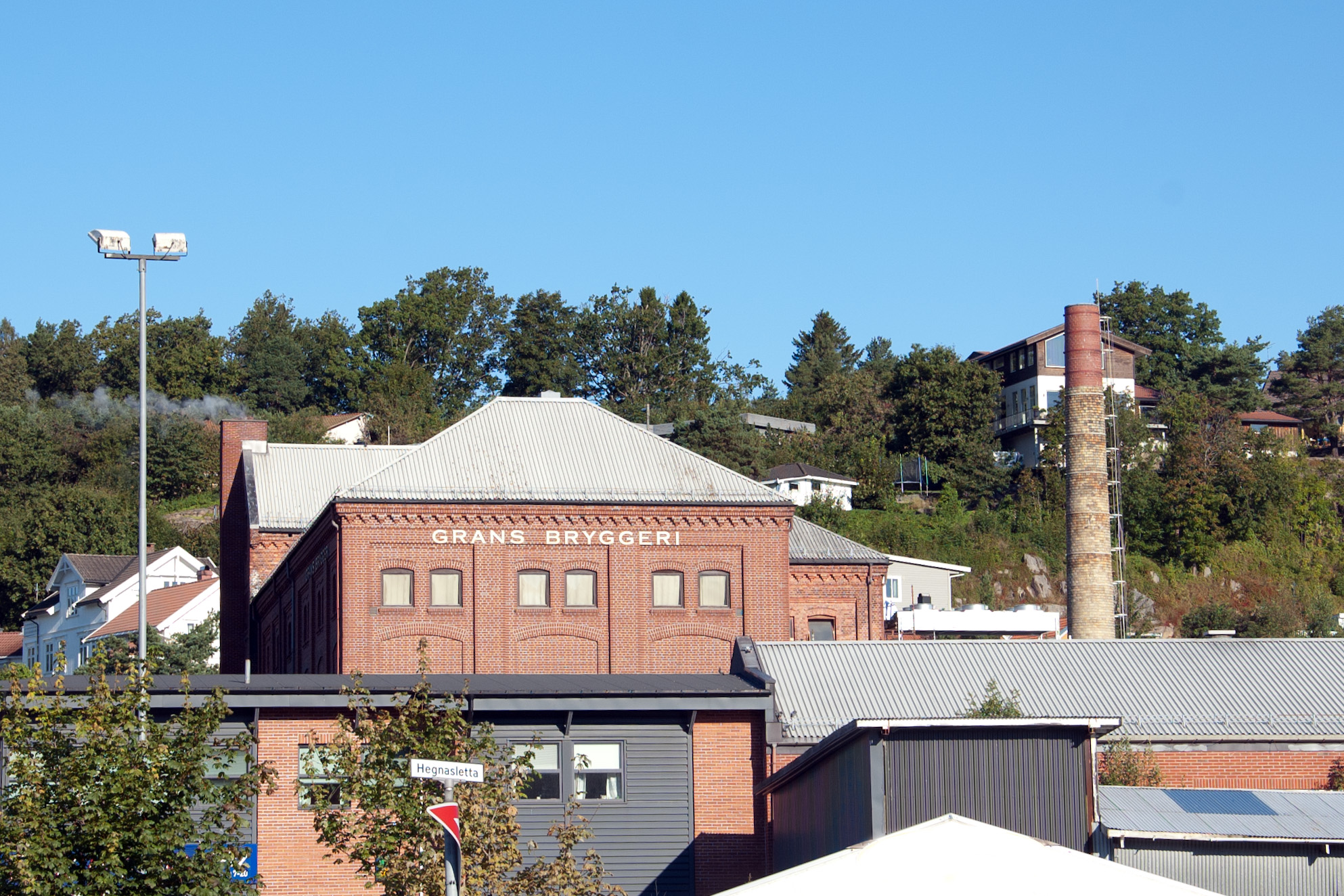
Grans Brewery in 2011.

Grans was established at Grønli in Sandefjord in 1899 under the name Sandefjords Bryggeri og Mineralvannfabrikk. Its first Chairman was Anton F. Klaveness and its first manager was Reidar Due. Peder Bugge Bull became a major shareholder in 1903. After Bull sold his shares in 1949, Guttorm Gran took over all stocks and renamed the brewery Sandefjords Bryggeri. In 1966, Guttorm Gran took his brewery out of the Norwegian Brewers & Soft Drank Association ("Den norske bryggeriforening") and renamed the brewery Grans Bryggeri (Grans Brewery). The brewery established its own grocery store chain in 1982. It established a distribution deal with REMA 1000 in the spring of 1996. As of 1996, the brewery operated 36 stores and its beer was not sold in any other stores besides REMA 1000 and the brewery's own stores. The brewery does not deliver products to bars or restaurants. The brewery became a family company ("familieaksjeselskap") in 1969. Guttorm Gran died in 1979 and his soon Guttorm Gran, Jr. took over the brewery in 1989. It had 50 employees as of 1996 and an annual beer production of 4.5 million liters.

Guttorm Gran took over Sandefjord Brewery (Sandefjord bryggeri) in 1949 when the company was doing badly both production-wise and economically. When Gran resigned from the brewery association in 1965, the brewery went its own way and became hugely popular. Soda brands and beer variations from Grans Brewery are now found throughout the Oslo Fjord region. As of 2000, the brewery produced 30 million bottles per year.

In 1966, the brewery acquired a new bottling plant with a four times higher production capacity. In its early years, the brewery presented itself as a more affordable alternative to its competition. In 1968, Grans Brewery began delivering its products to Oslo, and its products were sold throughout Eastern Norway, from Porsgrunn to Oslo. The brewery saw a large expansion in 1979. In the 1980s, Grans Brewery acquired the chain of grocery stores known as Grans Mini-kjøp. As of 1984, Grans operated three stores in Sandefjord and 35 shops in other cities. Gunnar Olav Hildrum was the brewmaster and brewery manager at Grans Brewery from the late 1960s until his retirement in 2003.

In 1997, the brewery began exporting its products throughout all of Norway, and in 2012, the brewery began exporting three brands of beer to Denmark.
