= Gaumina =

Lithuanian marketing company

Gaumina Ltd
- Company type: Independent
- Industry: Interactive Marketing, Online Advertising
- Founded: 1998
- Headquarters: Vilnius, Lithuania
- Number of locations: 2 offices in 3 countries
- Key people: CEO: Darius Bagdžiūnas
- Number of employees: 90
- Website: http://www.gaumina.co.uk

Gaumina is the largest interactive agency in the Baltics, providing services of web design, web development, online advertising, video, multimedia, mobile and viral.

The company works on projects for Procter & Gamble, Nokia, Nissan, Unilever, YX Energi, 7 Up, Vodafone, MTV, Dunnes Stores, Philip Morris, FIBA Europe as well as Irish public sector.

== History ==
Founded in 1998, Gaumina accounts for 39 percent of the Lithuanian interactive market and has completed more than 2,000 online projects.

Since 2004 the company has been operating in the UK and Ireland as Gaumina.co.uk.

In 2007 Gaumina gained wide media coverage for winning three awards in three days. A website developed by Gaumina won the Best Social Networking website award at the same the Irish Golden Spiders awards. A website developed by Gaumina was named among the 21 best European multimedia projects of 2007 in the final of Europrix Top Talent Award in Austria. The company was also named one of the winners of the national Innovation Prize 2007, awarding the Lithuania's most innovative companies, in the category of Innovative Enterprise.

The agency was named "Digital Agency of the Year" by International advertising festival Golden Hammer in September 2008. The agency also won the main prize at the best at Best Use of Film, Digital Animation or Motion Graphics category by the Irish Golden Spider awards in November 2008.

Gaumina is currently managed by CEO Darius Bagdžiūnas.
