= Alexela =

Estonian company

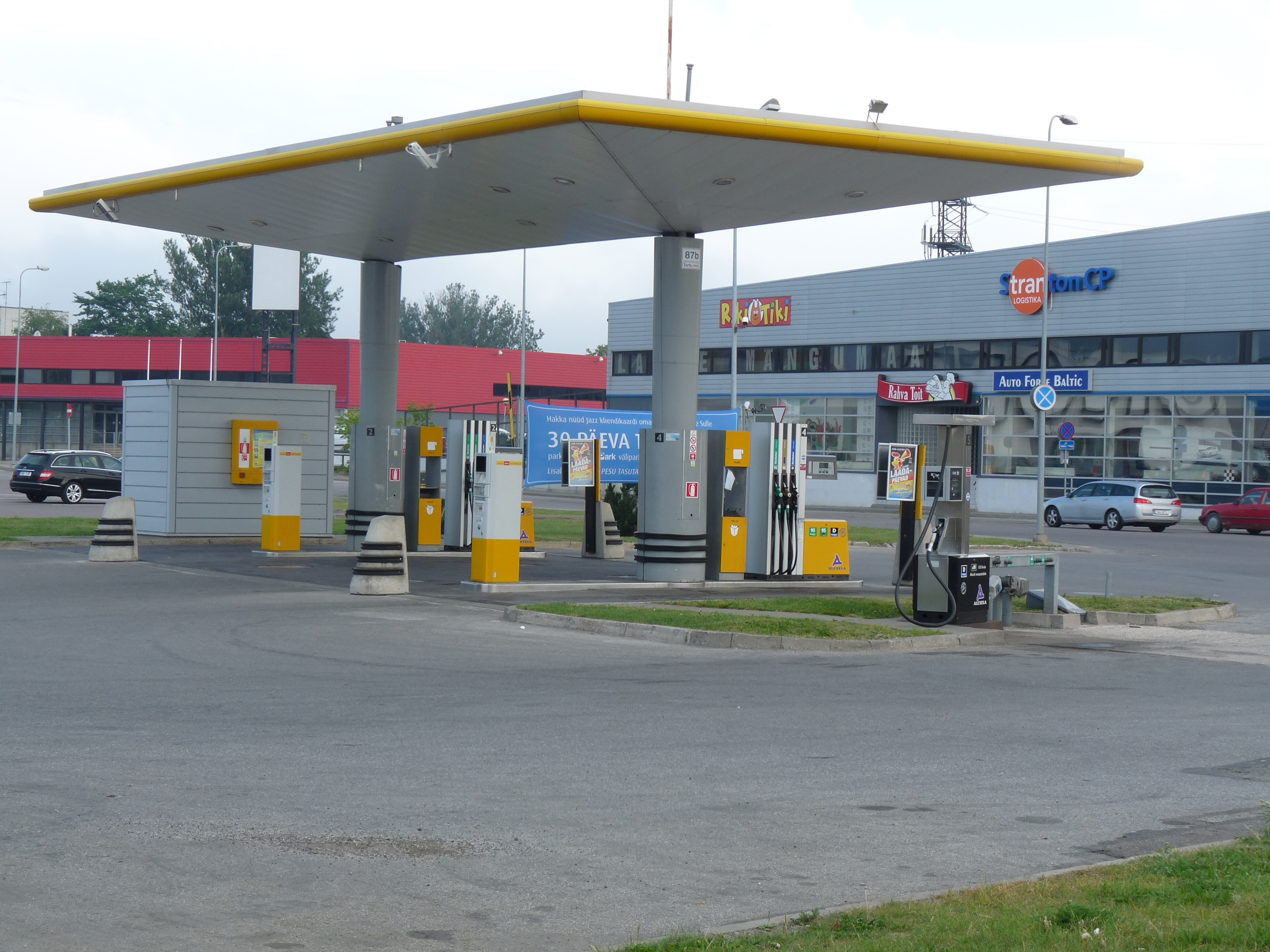
An Alexela Petroleum Station in Tallinn, Estonia

AS Alexela (formerly known as Reola Gaas and Alexela Energia AS) is an Estonian company primarily engaged in the energy sector. Alexela's product portfolio includes electricity, natural gas, cylinder gas, tank gas, and automotive fuels. The company employs over 1000 people, and owns more than a hundred gas stations in Estonia.

The majority owner is Heiti Hääl, with Marti Hääl as the CEO since 2023. The board of directors includes Marti Hääl, Aivo Adamson, and Karmo Piikmann. Alexela operates within the AVH Grupp AS group.

The company produces biomethane and builds solar and wind farms for renewable energy promotion. Operating an bioLNG terminal in Hamina port, Finland, Alexela engages in large scale projects like pumped hydro renewable energy storage and peak load biogas power plant. With 100+ gas stations and 43 convenience stores in Estonia, it offers electricity, natural gas, and various fuels.

== History ==
The first company of the group, trailer manufacturer AS Bestnet, was established in 1990. The fuel retail company fuel retailer AS Alexela Oil was established in 1993. In 2002, a petroleum product terminal was opened in Paldiski, Estonia, and in 2007, in Sillamäe, Estonia. In March 2006, Alexela Oil purchased from YX Energi the Uno-X chain in Estonia, Latvia, and Lithuania. In 2009–2010, it sold its service stations in Lithuania to Neste Oil and in Latvia to LR īpašumu aģentūra.

In 2006, a hot dip galvanising services provider AS Paldiski Tsingipada (Zincpot) was established. In May 2007, Alexela Logistics bought the Norwegian oil terminal Vest Tank (now Alexela Slovaag) in Sløvåg in Gulen Municipality, Sogn og Fjordane county, Norway. On 24 May 2007, one day after the acquisition entered into force, an explosion occurred in a tank having severe environmental and health consequences for people living nearby. According to the court ruling, the former owner of Vest Tank had to pay 160 million Norwegian krone to Alexela Solvaag to cover the costs of emptying the containers, renovating the terminal and liquidating the pollution caused by the explosion.

The LNG terminal developer AS Balti Gaas was established in 2009. In 2011, Alexela bought a majority stake in the liquid gas retailer Reola Gaas from Neste. In December 2011, Alexela bought a 50% stake in Kiviõli Keemiatööstus, a shale-oil producer. In 2014, remaining stakes in Reola Gaas and Kiviõli Keemiatööstus, as also Gasum's Estonian business were acquired by Alexela. In 2012, it created an electricity retailer Elektrimüügi AS.

The group was reorganized as a holding company in summer 2012. That time the group was controlled by Heiti Hääl and Kazakhstan's businessman Igor Bidilo who together owned 73.8% of the shares. In 2014, Bidilo was bought out from the company and the main owners became brothers Heiti and Marti Hääl.

In 2015, Reola Gaas was merged into Alexela Energia. In 2018, Alexela purchased the electricity retailer 220 Energia.

== Operations ==
=== Energy ===
Alexela Group's energy-companies are Alexela Oil, Alexela Energia, Kiviõli Keemiatööstus, Alexela Logistics, and Balti Gaas. Alexela Oil is an operator of service stations chain in Estonia. Alexela Energia is a seller of electricity and gas. Kiviõli Keemiatööstus is a producer of shale oil. Balti Gaas is planning an LNG terminal in Paldiski. Together with Haminan Energia and Wärtsilä Alexela develops a LNG terminal in Hamina, Finland.

Alexela Logistics is an oil transportation and logistics company, which through its daughter companies owns and operates oil terminals in Paldiski, Sillamäe (both in Estonia) and Sløvåg (Norway). The company had a stake also in the terminal in Murmansk (Russia); however, this stake was sold in October 2007. In addition to Heiti Hääl and management of the company, the major shareholder is Puma Energy, a subsidiary of Trafigura.

=== Metal industry ===
AS Bestnet is a trailer manufacturer and S Paldiski Tsingipada (Zincpot) is a hot dip galvanising services provider.

=== Property development ===
AS OmaKoduMaja is a developer of industrial parks. Baltic Exchange is an owner of the historical building of the Baltic Exchange. The building was disassembled and transported to Estonia, where it was planned to be assembled in Tallinn.

== See also ==
- Energy in Estonia
