= Odd Reitan =

Norwegian businessman

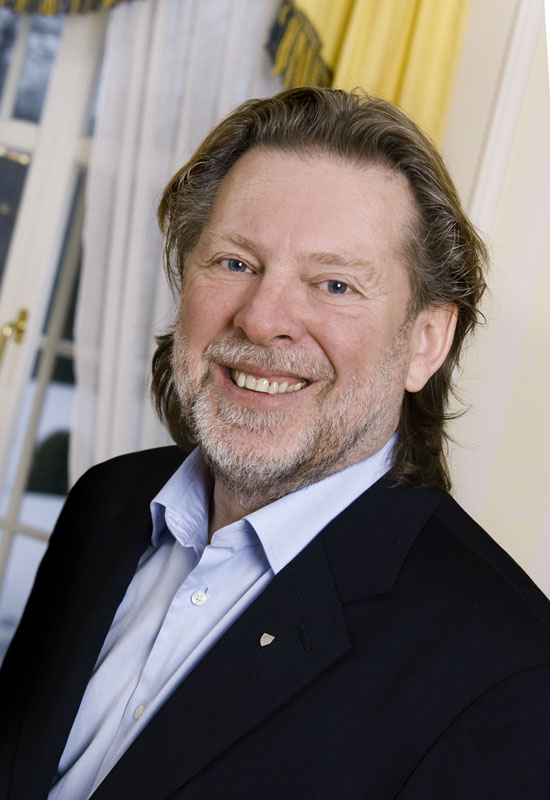
- Reitan in 2010
- Born: 11 September 1951 (age 74); Trondheim, Norway
- Occupation: Businessman
- Known for: Founder, CEO and co-owner of Reitan AS
- Spouses: Marit Arntsen (m. 1972, divorced) Hilde Undlien (m. 2018)
- Children: Ole Robert Reitan and Magnus Reitan
- Relatives: Kristoffer Reitan (grandson)
- Website: www.reitangruppen.no

Odd Reitan (born 11 September 1951) is a Norwegian billionaire businessman. He was born in Trondheim. He is co-owner and CEO of the Reitan AS.

== Early life ==
Reitan is the son of "single-store grocers", Ole Reitan and Margit Aarhaug.

== Career ==
Reitan established his first shop in Trondheim in 1972, in cooperation with his father. In 1979 he established the grocery chain store REMA 1000, which came to be a great success. By 1990 every village in Norway with more than 10,000 inhabitants had a Rema 1000 shop. During the 1990s the chain expanded in Denmark, Sweden, Poland, Hungary and Slovakia.

Reitan played keyboard in the music group Four Jets in the 1960s.

== 2012 book ==
He and his 2012 book, Hvis jeg var president ("If I was president"), was the subject of an editorial in Klassekampen. The editorial highlighted his idea of him governing Norway without being elected by popular vote. His idea is that he could be appointed by Norway's king. The editorial described these ideas as "undemocratic dirt".

== Philanthropy ==
In 2013 he awarded Norwegian kroner 2 million to Anlov Mathiesen (chief editor of =Oslo), saying that Mathiesen's work contributes to "increased self-respect for the vendors of the street magazines."

== Personal life ==
In 1972, he married Marit Arntsen (born 1952). They have the two sons, Ole Robert Reitan (born 1971), and Magnus Reitan. Reitan is the grandfather of golfer Kristoffer Reitan.

In June 2018, he married Hilde Undlien in Nidaros Cathedral in Trondheim. They had been in a relationship since 2012. He resides in Trondheim.
