= Bertrand Narvesen =

Norwegian businessman and merchant (1860–1939)

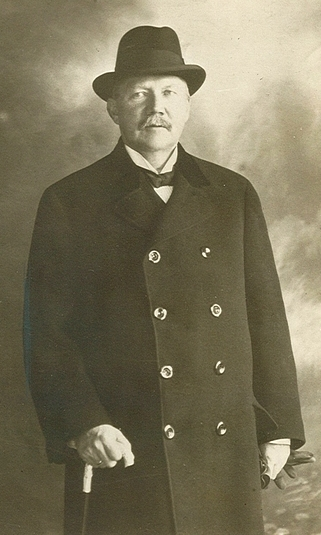
- Born: April 29, 1860; Brunlanes, Norway
- Died: March 7, 1939 (aged 78); Ringebu, Norway
- Occupations: Businessman; merchant

Bertrand Narve Louis Narvesen (April 29, 1860 – March 7, 1939) was a Norwegian businessman and merchant. He was the founder of the Norwegian chain of newsagents Narvesens Kioskkompagni (Later shortened to Narvesen). Today, Narvesen is one of the largest chains of convenience stores in Norway, and Norway's leading retailer of international newspapers and periodicals.

Bertrand Narvesen was born in the parish of Brunlanes Municipality in Vestfold county, Norway. Narvesen first joined the National Postal Service (Posten Norge). In 1887 he applied, and received the railway's permission to run a news agency at Larvik station and to sell Kristiania based newspapers. Narvesen left the postal service in 1893. In 1894, he received approval from the Norwegian State Railways to take over the sale of newspapers, magazines and travel literature on the national railways. Narvesens Kioskkompagni became a nationwide company and a joint stock company in 1928. Narvesen retired from the daily management in 1902, and continued as chairman until his death in Ringebu Municipality on March 7, 1939.
