= YX Energi =

Norwegian and Danish gas station chain

- Type: Fuel station
- Number of locations: 650
- Area served: Norway; Denmark
- Owner: Reitangruppen
- Website: www.yxenergi.no www.yxenergi.dk

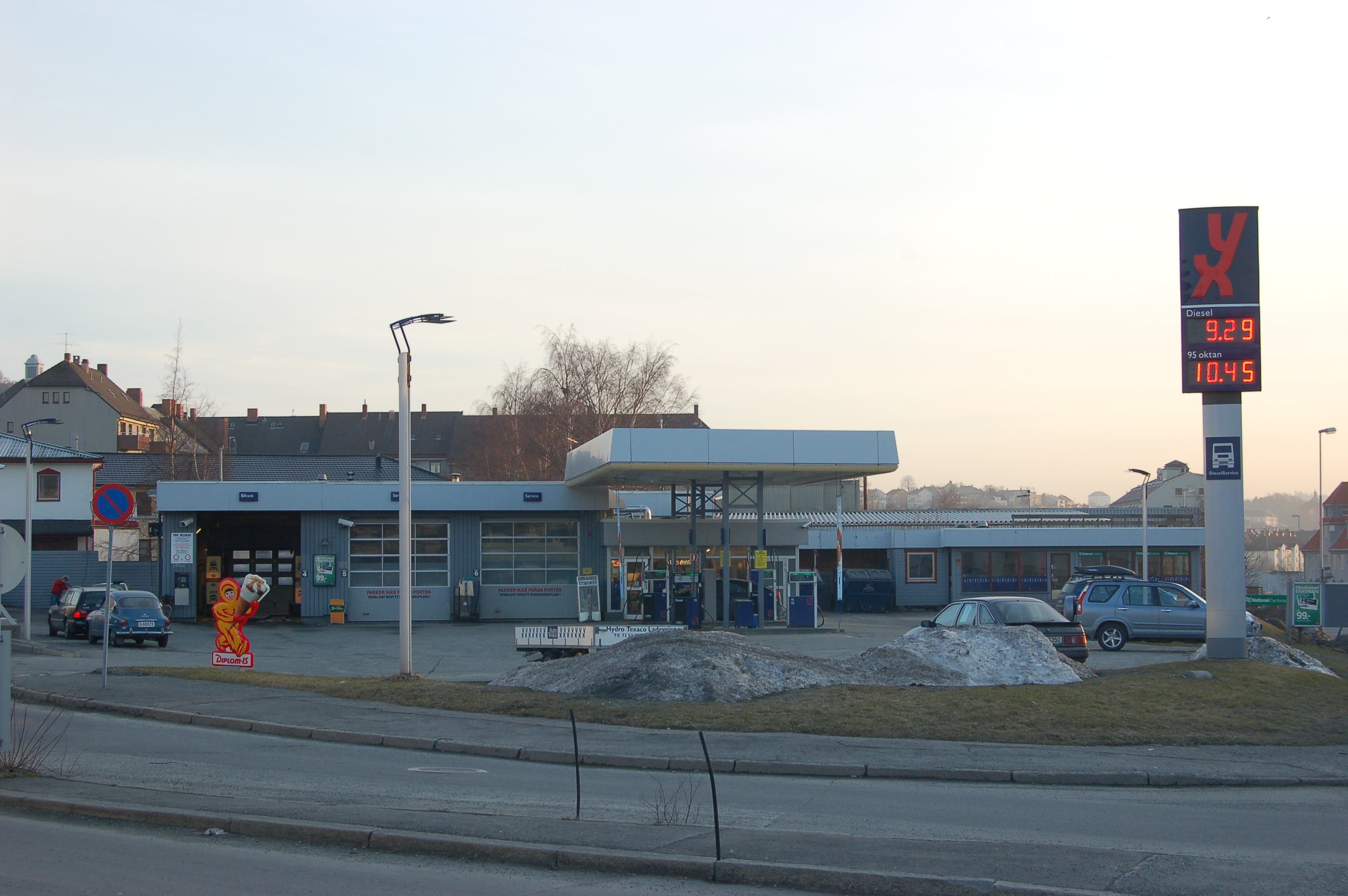
A HydroTexaco fuel station at Lade in Trondheim, Norway

YX Energi, formerly known as Hydro Texaco, is a Norwegian and Danish gas station chain formed after the merge of the Hydro and Texaco gas station chains in 1995. In 2006 the company was bought by Reitangruppen and incorporated into their chain including the implementation of 7-Eleven brand on the service stations. Uno-X and Rema Bensin are low-cost brand names of YX.

== Operations ==
YX operates 750 gas stations in Norway and Denmark, including the low price brands Uno-X and Rema Bensin. In addition the chain has DieselService stations for truck diesel. Hydro Texaco operates in addition a service for household paraffin distribution. Hydro Texaco has about a 20% market share in automotive fuels in Norway.

	Norway	Denmark
YX	300	73
Uno-X	110	200
DieselService	47	

== History ==
Hydro Texaco was a result of a merger between the Hydro and Texaco gas station chains in Norway and Denmark on January 1, 1995, with Norsk Hydro and Texaco each owning 50%. The Hydro chain had been created in the early 1990s when Norsk Hydro acquired the Mobil gas stations in Norway and Sweden and the operations of Uno-X in Denmark. In the mid of 1990s Hydro Texaco started business in the Baltic countries under brands of Hydro Texaco and later Uno-X. Texaco's ownership in Hydro Texaco was transferred to Chevron as a result of the two companies merger in 2001. In 2003 Hydro Texaco took over the operations of 35 Rema Bensin in Norway from Reitangruppen and changed them to the brand Uno YX. The chain was acquired by the Norwegian Reitangruppen in 2006. The gas stations chain in the Baltic countries was bought by Estonian company Alexela Oil.

From October 1, 2006 the chains were owned by Reitangruppen, who rebranded to YX. At the same time Coop NKL announced that it would withdraw the membership bonus on YX stations, due to REMA 1000, also owned by Reitangruppen, being a major competitor to Coop's stores.

In 2007 an agreement was made between Reitan and Shell, converting 91 Norwegian and 63 Danish YX outlets to Shell with 7-eleven stores, still owned and operated by Reitan. It has been announced that the remaining YX outlets in Denmark will be converted to Uno-X, some will still have a convenience store attached but apparently in the future with no possibility of paying for petrol in the store. As of 1 January 2009 there's 69 YX outlets and 250 Uno-X outlets in Denmark with apparently only one more to be rebranded 'Shell'.

As Shell at the same time rebranded their unmanned Metax gas-stations 'Shell Express', 12 poorly performing outlets were switched the other way to Uno-X.
