= Uno-X =

Scandinavian fuel station chain

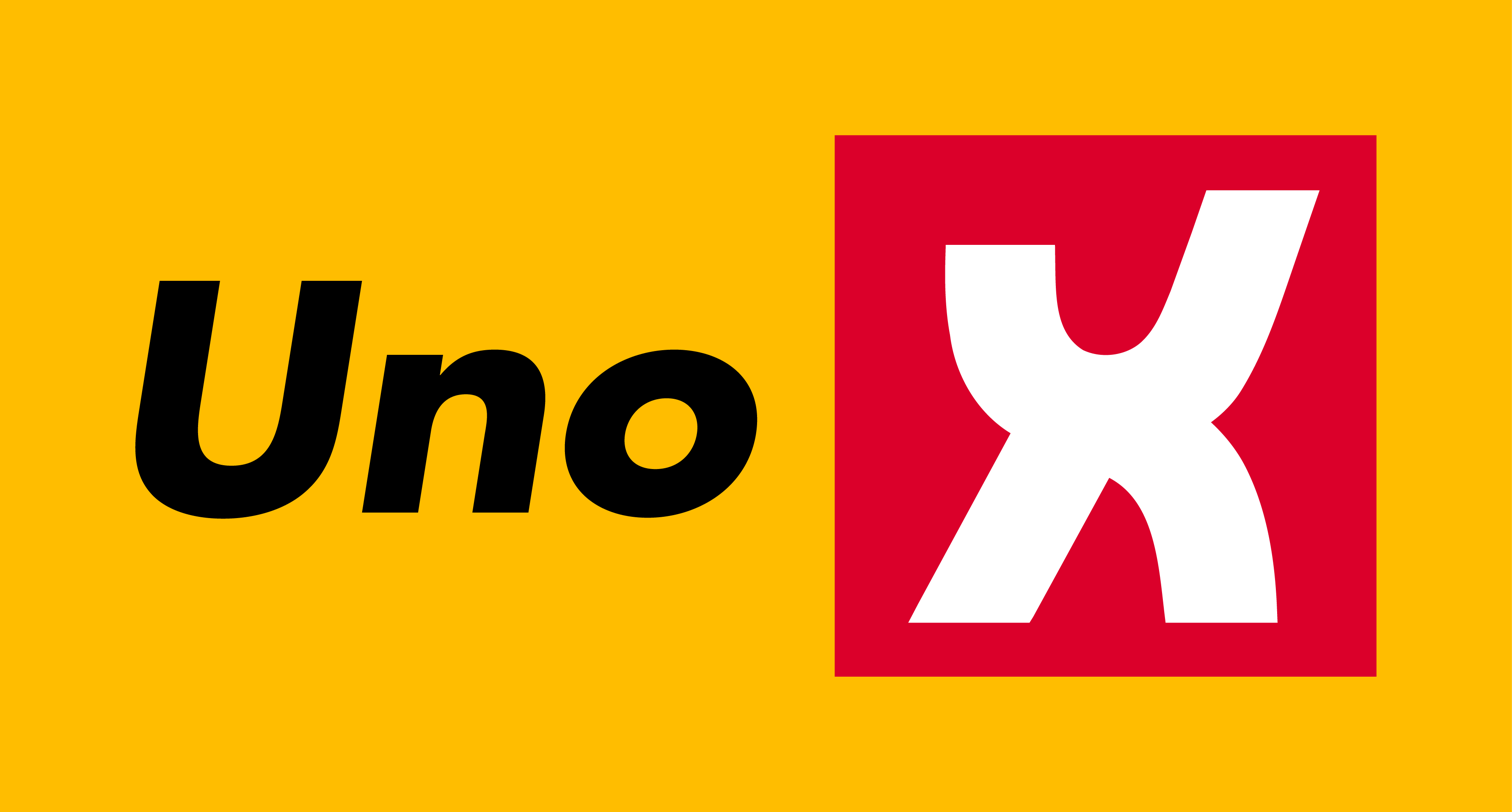
- Type: Fuel station
- Defunct: 6 November 2023
- Headquarters: Oslo
- Number of locations: 560
- Area served: Denmark; Norway
- Owner: Reitan Retail
- Website: unoxmobility.com

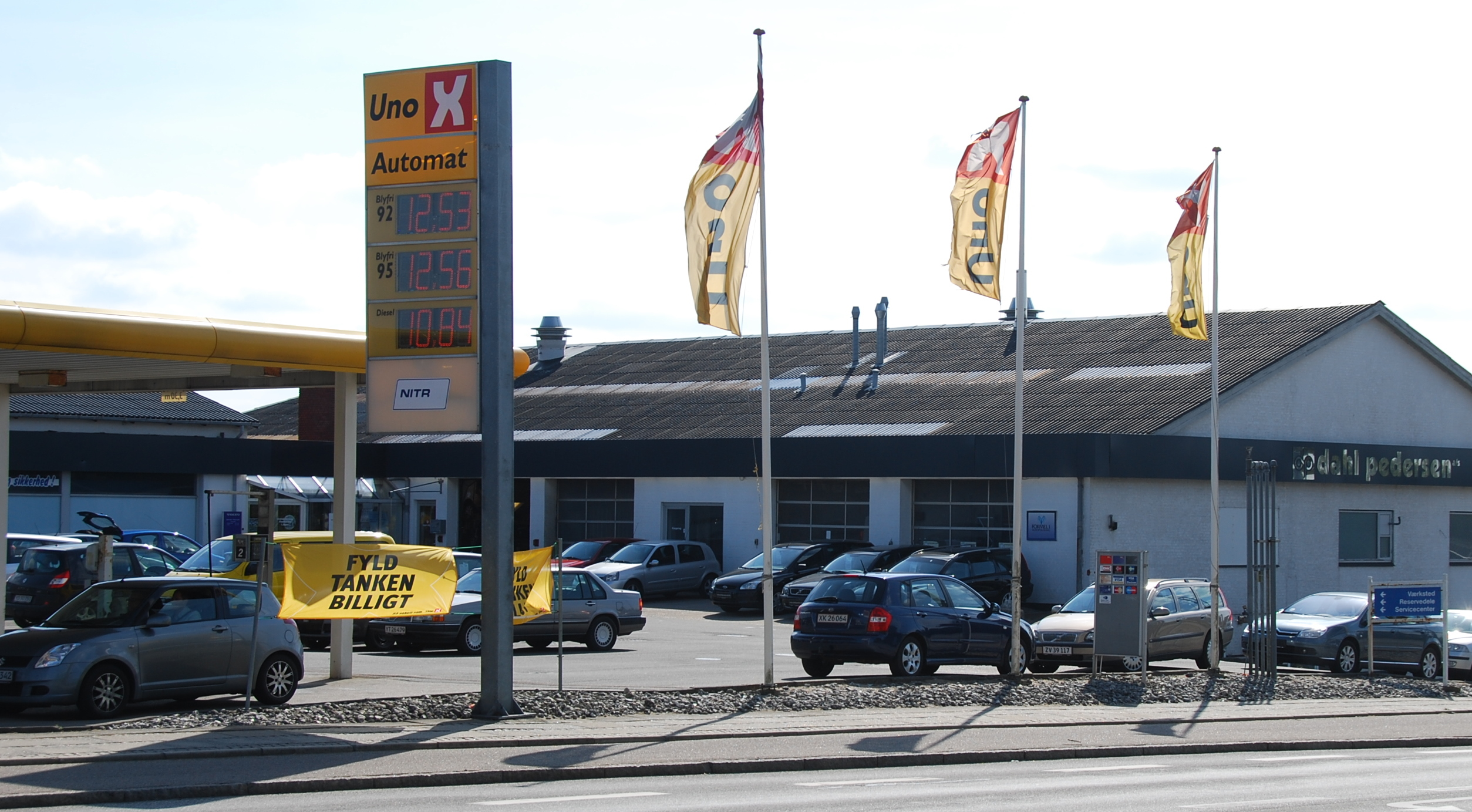
Uno-X fuel station in Viborg, Denmark (Photo: Lars Schmidt)

Uno-X is a chain of unmanned fuel stations throughout Norway and Denmark. It is operated as the low-cost section of YX Energi. The chain was originally created as a low cost chain in Denmark in the late 1950s. The rights to use the name in Sweden were sold to Britain's Burmah Oil. In 1991 Norsk Hydro acquired the 330 outlets of the Danish operation and five years later it bought the Swedish Uno-X chain from Burmah.

After Norsk Hydro merged its operations in Denmark and Norway with Texaco, the chain was repositioned on wholly unmanned sites under a new yellow, black and red logo, and now has around 110 stations in Norway and 200 stations in Denmark. The Danish chain includes the architecturally well known Skovshoved Petrol Station designed in 1936 by Arne Jacobsen.

Following Norsk Hydro's acquisition by Statoil, the 250 stations in Sweden were sold in December 2009 to St1 and the Norwegian and Danish operations to the retail group Reitangruppen, now Reitan Retail. As St1 rebranded or closed all the Swedish stations the brand has since had presence in Denmark and Norway only.
