= Narvesen =

Norwegian convenience store chain

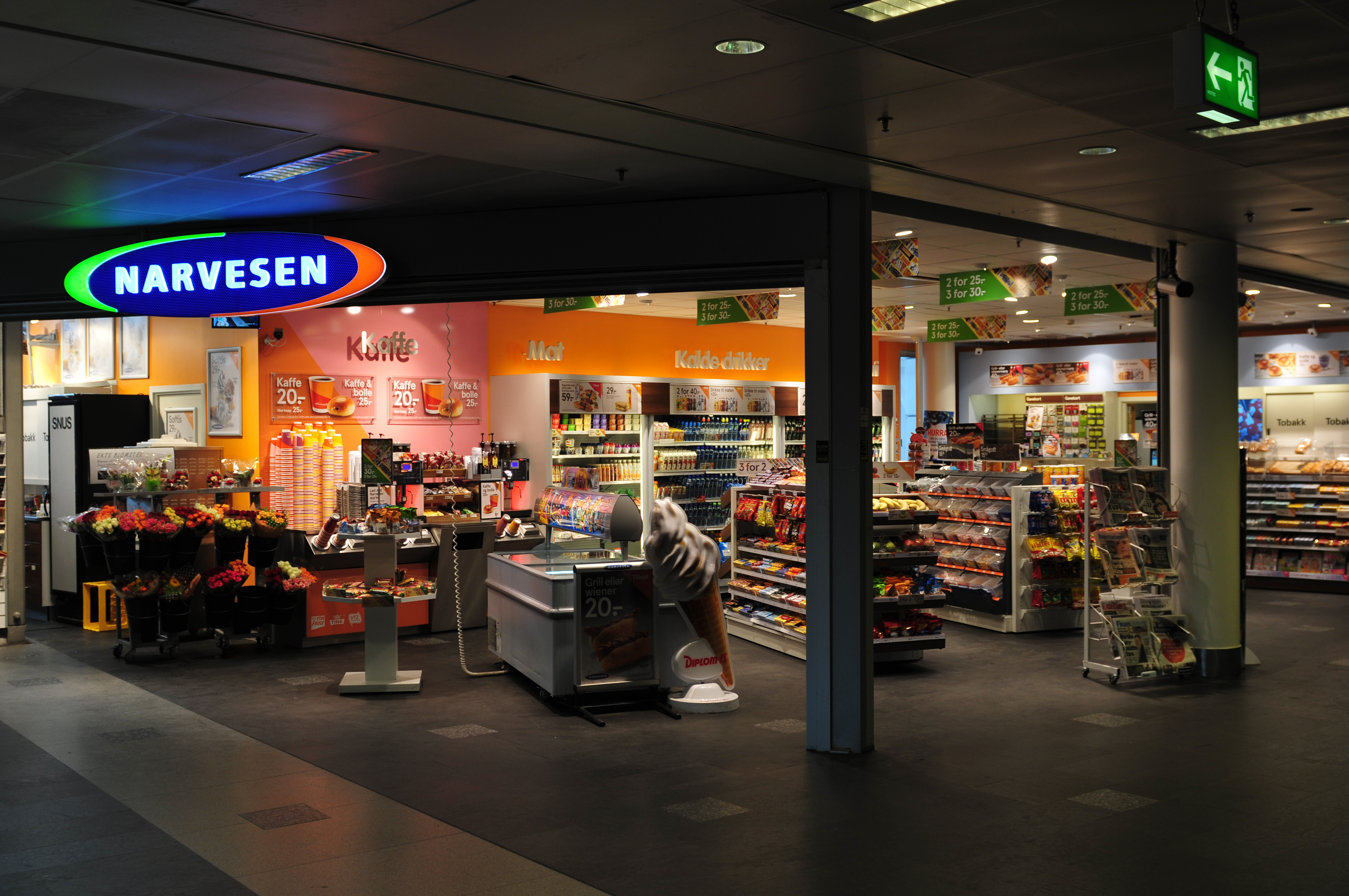
- Narvesen in Oslo
- Industry: Retailing
- Founder: Bertrand Narvesen
- Area served: Norway, Latvia, Lithuania
- Revenue: €80.725 million (2019)
- Parent: Reitan
- Website: narvesen.no

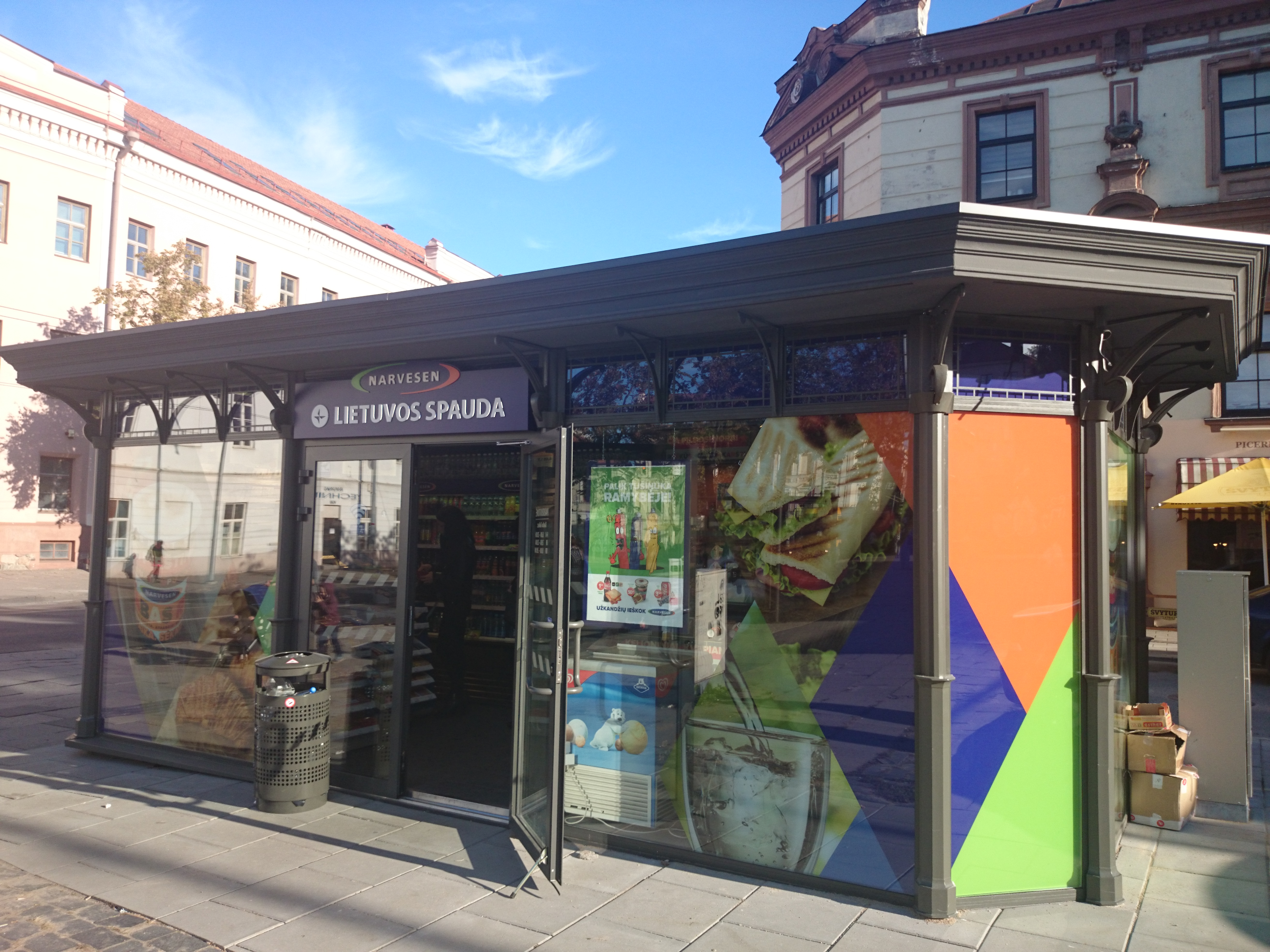
A Narvesen store in Vilnius, Lithuania

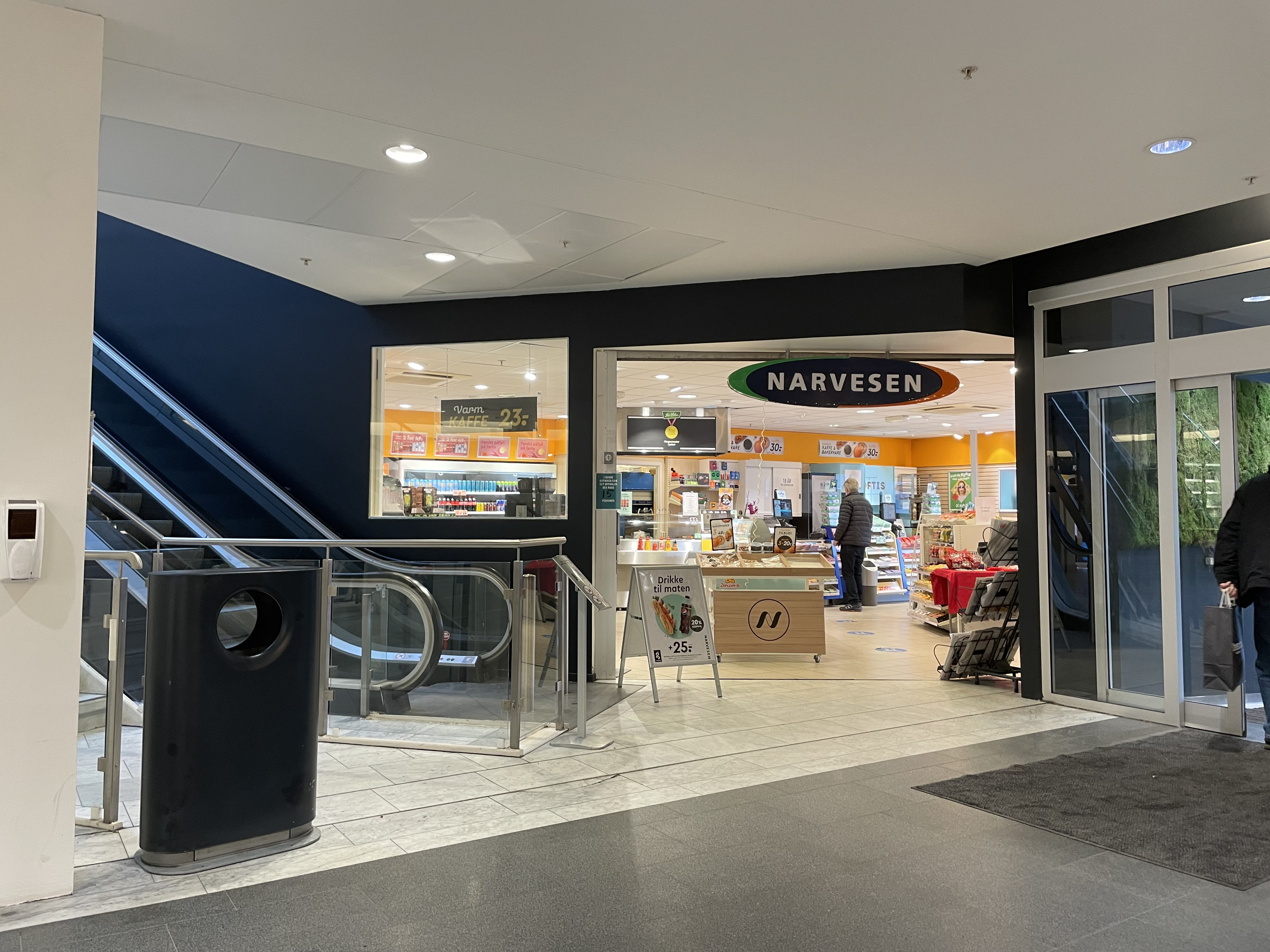
A Narvesen store in Hønefoss, Norway

Narvesen is a Norwegian chain of newsagents / convenience stores which, with its 370 outlets nationwide, is one of Norway's largest retailers. The company has since 2000 been part of Reitan.

Narvesens Kioskkompagni (the name later shortened to Narvesen) was established by the businessman and merchant Bertrand Narvesen (1860–1939) who in 1894 received approval from Norwegian State Railways to take over the sale of all newspapers, magazines, and travel literature at its stations. Narvesen became a nationwide joint stock company in 1928.

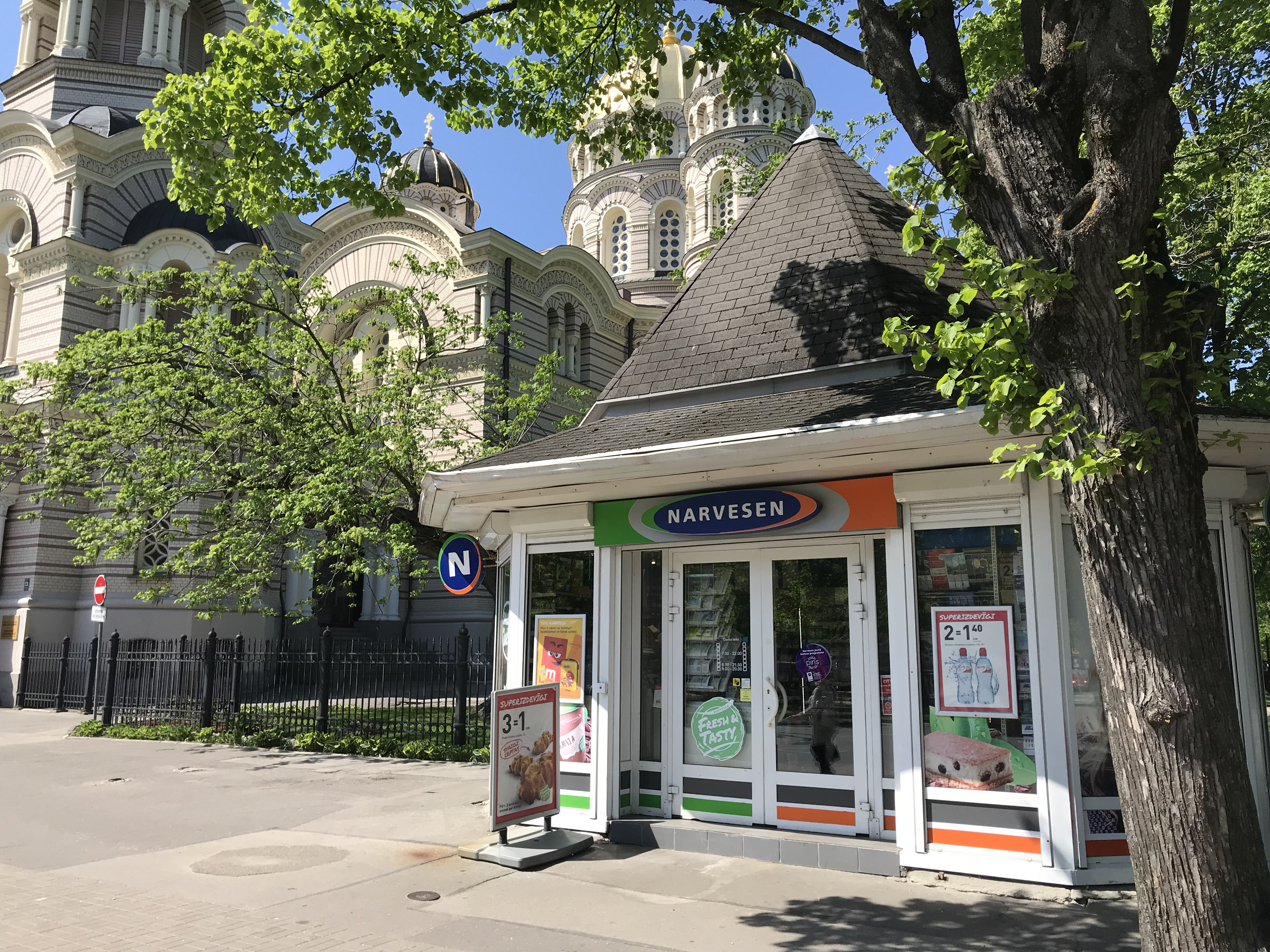
A Narvesen in Riga

Today Narvesen also operates 249 stores in Latvia and a further 260 stores in Lithuania, where it shares market with Lietuvos spauda, also owned by Reitan since 2012.

Narvesen's presence in Latvia began in 1997, and greatly expanded when the company acquired the Preses apvienība chain of kiosks in 2000. The chain had a market share of 41% in 2020.
