= Knut Sæther =

Knut Sæther (born 25 May 1954) is a Norwegian jurist, civil servant and pig farmer.

He was chief administrative officer in Sør-Trøndelag County Municipality, then chief administrative officer in Trondheim. While chief administrative officer in Trondheim, he was under police investigation for an attempt to purchase a municipal lot next to his own. In 2000, he asked to purchase a lot in Reppe, which he was granted from the municipality. But the County Governor rejected the transaction, as the lot was within a recreational area. The politicians then passed a new area plan, which stated that the lot would be allowed to be used for building. The city administration did an error and colored the official planning maps green, for recreational areas, and then afterwards made a technical correction to change it to yellow. When the sale of the lot was voted over again in 2004, after Sæther was no longer chief of administration, and Sæther was again permitted to purchase the lot. But the County Governor again terminated the sale, stating that the correction was not valid. This resulted in arguing between the municipality and the County Governor, and the politicians and the municipal administration. Sæther was never allowed to purchase the lot and was instead reported to the police for corruption, nepotism and forgery. The charges were dropped by the police.

In 2002 he was appointed as director of the Norwegian National Courts Administration. In 2004, Sæther and colleagues traveled to Strasbourg to test the hotel possibilities. The issue resulted in media attention and whether such investigations were necessary. Shortly afterwards, the administration issued a tender for a new contract as travel agent, and the company who organized the Strasbourg trip won the tender. The board concluded that nothing was worth criticizing.

In 2008 he was nominated to the job as chair of Nortura, but was not appointed after opposition from the cooperative's members.

Preceded by position created	Director of the Norwegian National Courts Administration; 2002–2008	Succeeded by Tor Langbach
