= Øya stadion =

Sports venue in Trondheim, Norway

Coordinates: 63°25′36″N 10°22′48″E

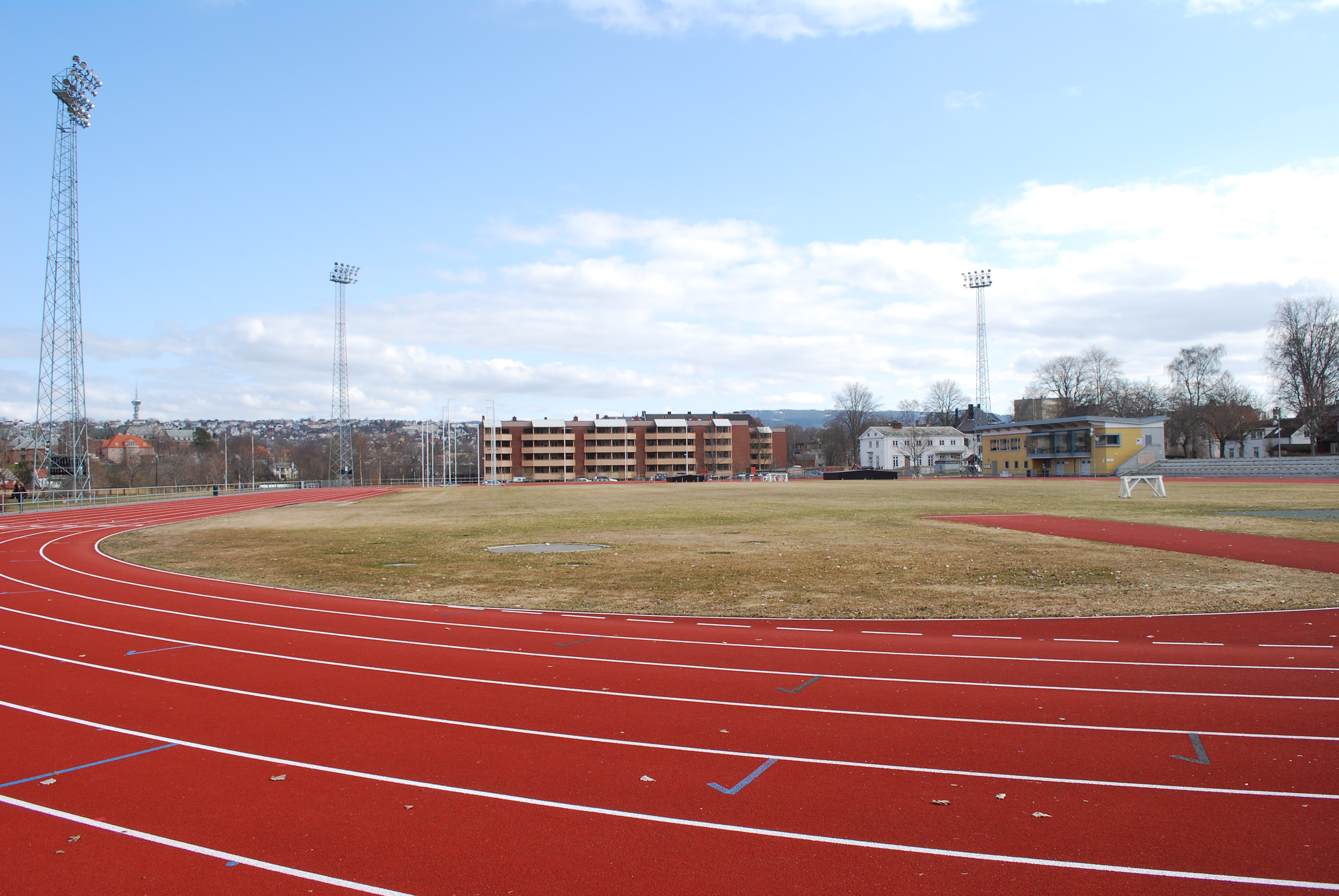
Øya stadion.

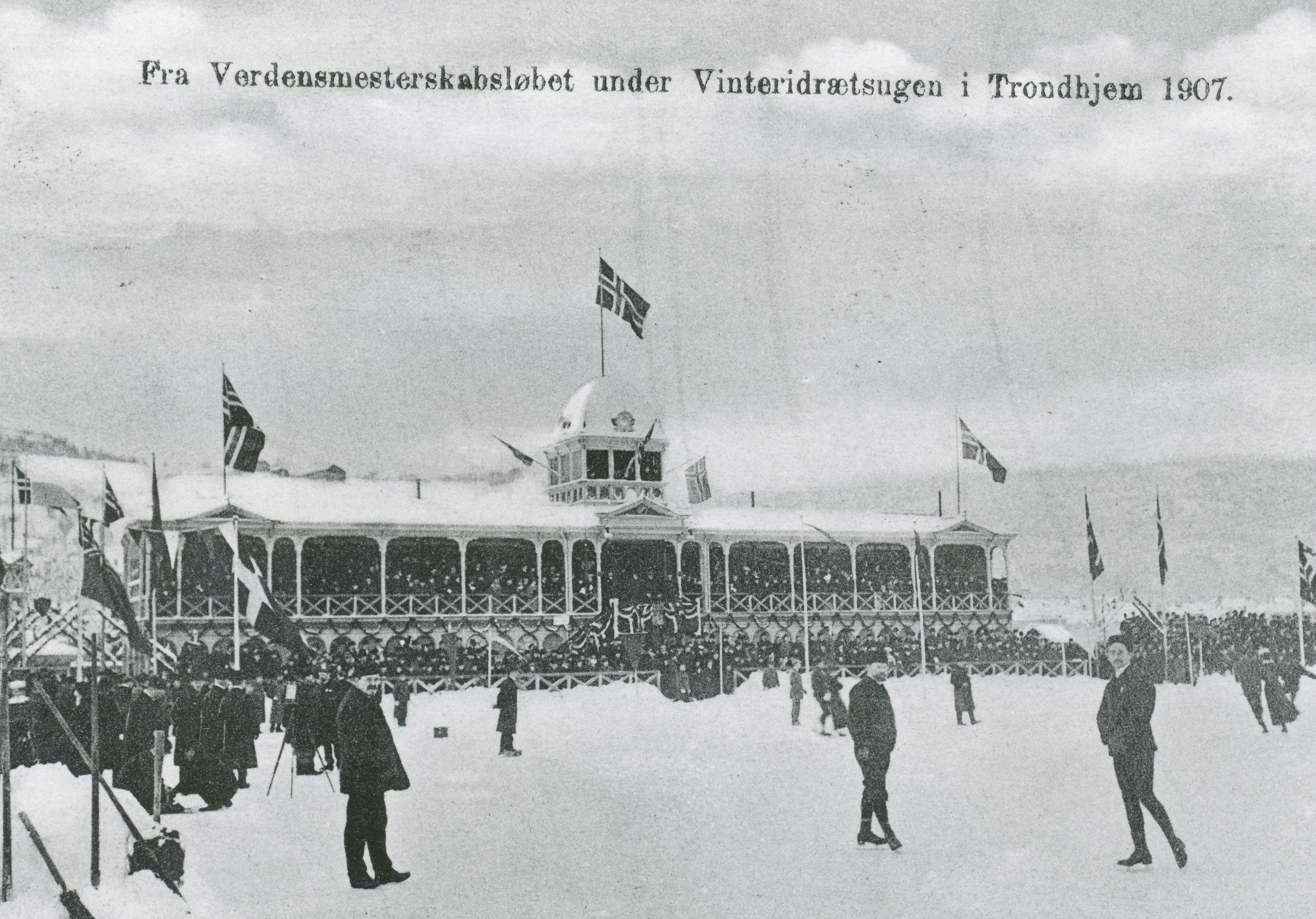
Øya stadion (1907).

Øya stadion, also known as Trondheim stadion, is an athletics facility in Nidarø, Trondheim, Norway. The field was established as "Øen stadion" in 1900 as a combined athletics field and skating rink.

== Skating ==
From the opening in 1900 up until the war, Øen stadion in Trondheim was one of Norway's main facilities for speed skating, where Trondhjems Skøiteklub was the coordinator of a series of championships.

The first large event at Øya was the European championship in 1901, where Kristiania-born skater Rudolf Gundersen won. In 1907, the first world championship was arranged at Øya, and would also hold the event in 1911, 1926, and 1933. Øya stadion would also later hold another European championship in 1930. After the war there were only two more championships held at Øya, the unofficial European championship in 1946, and a women's world championship in 1966.

Øya was abandoned as a skating rink after the new Leangen Ice Hall was completed in 1979.

There are three notable world records in long distance held at Øya. In 1917, Oscar Mathisen broke the record for the 10,000 m race with a time of 17:36.4. In 1917 Kristian Strøm broke the 5,000 m record in a time of 8:33.7. The last, in 1951, Hjalmar Andersen broke Kornel Pajor's to year old record from Davos by six seconds with a time of 8:07.3 at Øya.

== Athletics ==
The venue has hosted the Norwegian Athletics Championships in 1902, 1909, 1916, 1925, 1948, 1953, 1958 and 2008.
