= St1 =

Finnish energy company

St1 Suomi Oy
- Type: Private
- Founded: Station 1 Finland Oy was founded in 1997
- Headquarters: Helsinki, Finland
- Key people: Henrikki Talvitie (CEO); Mika Anttonen (Chairman of the Board)
- Owner: Mika Anttonen
- Parent: St1 Nordic Oy
- Website: www.st1.fi

St1 Suomi Oy is a Finnish energy company and a part of St1 Nordic group that operates in Finland, Sweden, Norway and the United Kingdom. In Finland St1 Suomi Oy has a sister company called St1 Lähienergia Oy, focused on ground source heating solutions. In September 2025 St1 announced that St1 Suomi Oy will merge its subsidiary, Lämpöpuisto Oy.

== Retail station network ==
St1’s retail network offers marketplaces with fuels, growing number of EV charging and biogas filling points for heavy-duty transport and car wash, alongside stand-alone convenience stores and restaurants.

St1 has previously operated both St1- and Shell-branded networks under a long-term licence agreement. With the current license agreement period coming to an end, St1 has fully transitioned to its own brand. The rebranding of the station network started in April 2025. 2025. By December 2025, more than 170 Shell-branded stations in Finland have been converted into St1 stations, creating a nationwide network of around 470 sites. At the same time, the company has unified its service offering and expanded both its EV charging and heavy-duty biogas networks.

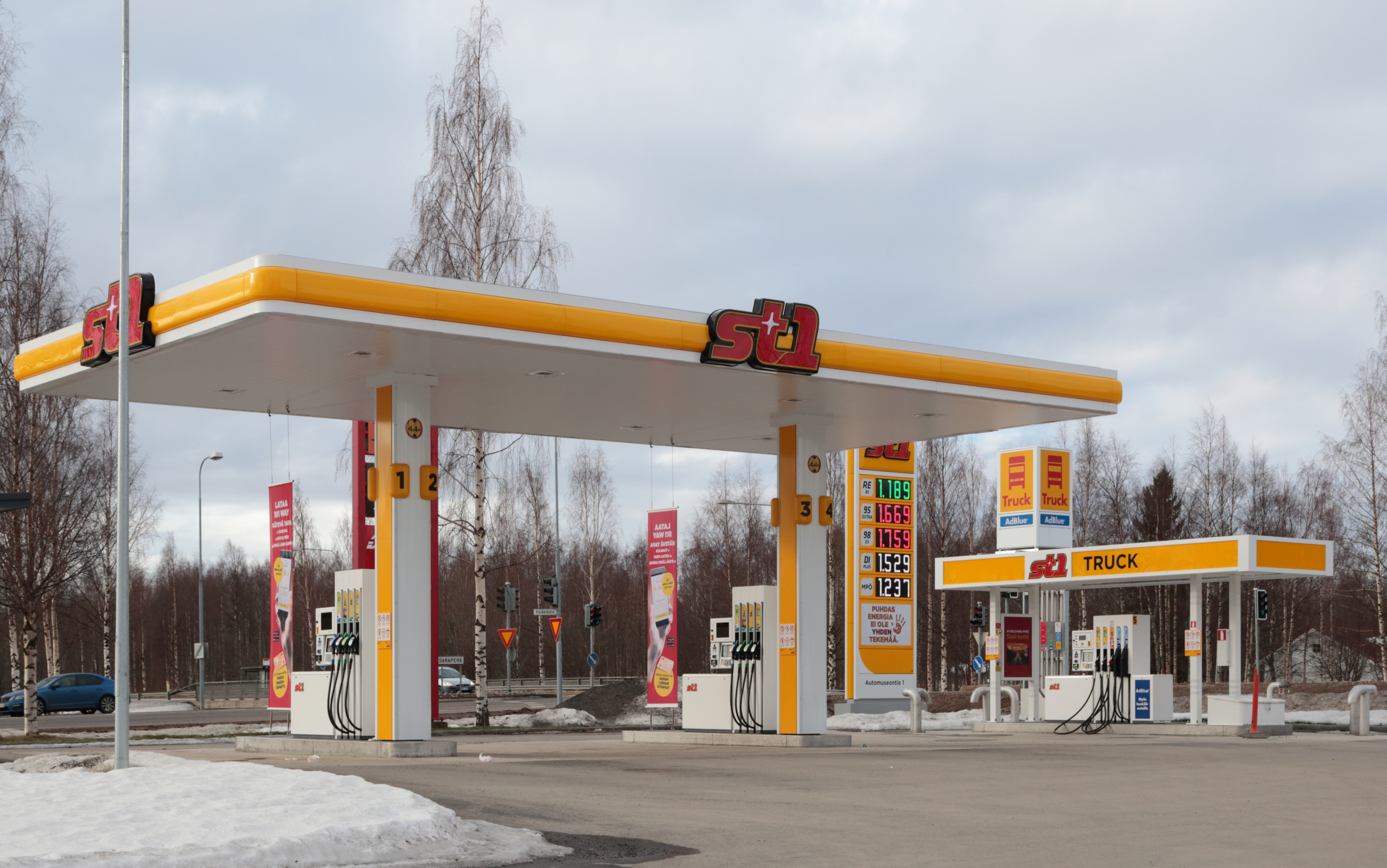
St1 retail station in Oulu, Finland

St1 has strong market positions in all Nordic countries. In 2024 the company’s market share was 23.4% in petrol and 19.5% in diesel in Finland.

== Fuels ==
The main source of petrol and diesel sold in St1’s retail station network is the St1 refinery in Gothenburg, Sweden. The goal of St1 is to reduce fossil CO_{2} emissions in traffic step-by-step by bringing high-quality fuels with a lower environmental impact into the market.

In 2021 St1 launched on the Finnish market Hydrotreated Vegetable Oil diesel. Renewable HVO diesel reduces greenhouse gas emissions by as much as 90% compared to fossil diesel. St1 has also developed and introduced waste-based RE85 high-blend ethanol fuel in Finland.

St1 is building liquefied biogas (LBG) refueling station network for heavy transport around Finland. LBG is a renewable fuel that can be produced e.g. from the manure and other agricultural by-products of cattle farms – as St1 is planning to do in Finland in cooperation with food company Valio.

== History ==
St1 traces its origins to the mid-1990s, when former Neste oil trader Mika Anttonen founded Greenergy Baltic (in partnership with Greenergy) together with Ilkka Kokko in 1995-1996 to trade fuels with private dealers in Finland. The operating company Station 1 Finland Oy was incorporated in 1997 to develop the business beyond trading into distribution and retail channels. Early growth in the late 1990s and 2000s saw the emergence of the St1 retail brand in Finland and a shift from wholesale supply to operating a branded station network through acquisitions that built national scale; in the same period the company began piloting waste-based ethanol concepts (Etanolix and Bionolix) alongside its retail expansion.

St1 moved into a new phase of Nordic expansion and vertical integration in 2010 by acquiring Shell’s downstream operations in Finland and Sweden, including the Gothenburg refinery and approximately 565 filling stations, under a long-term licence to continue using the Shell brand at the acquired retail sites. In 2015 St1 acquired Shell’s Norwegian marketing company Smart Fuel AS, adding more than 400 retail sites, nationwide logistics and a substantial direct sales business. The deal included a retail brand licence to keep the Shell name at stations and an aviation fuelling joint venture with Shell in Norway.

During the 2010s the portfolio was diversified further into renewables and heat. St1 delivered an Etanolix waste-to-ethanol unit in Gothenburg in 2015 and commissioned a Cellunolix demonstration plant in Kajaani in 2017 to produce advanced ethanol from softwood sawdust, complementing earlier Finnish Etanolix/Bionolix plants. The Kajaani unit later ceased operations. In parallel, the group developed ground‑source heating through St1 Lähienergia Oy and piloted deep geothermal heat in Espoo (Otaniemi). Although the deep‑heat pilot was not commercialized, its wells were opened for research use in 2024.

== See also ==
- Energy in Finland
