= Reitan (company) =

Norwegian conglomerate

Reitan AS
- Type: Private
- Industry: Retailing
- Founded: 1948; 78 years ago
- Headquarters: Trondheim, Norway
- Area served: Northern Europe
- Key people: Odd Reitan (CEO)
- Revenue: ▲NOK 116 billion €11.5 billion (2022)
- Number of employees: 38,000 (2019)
- Website: reitan.no/en

Reitan AS, formerly known as Reitangruppen (Reitan Group), is a Norwegian conglomerate comprising three business areas: Reitan Retail, Reitan Eiendom (Reitan Real Estate) and Reitan Kapital.

Reitan's head office is at Lade Gaard in Trondheim, Reitan's cultural and financial center. Reitan Retail and Reitan Kapital has its operational center in Oslo, while Reitan Eiendom is based in Trondheim.

Reitan had a turnover in 2018 (including franchise sales) of 95 billion NOK, and employs 38,000 people in Scandinavia and the Baltic region. Reitan's mission is to manage strong and independent business areas in retailing and real estate.

== History ==
The company started in 1948 when Ole Reitan opened the O. Reitan Kolonial store in Nonnegata in Trondheim.

In 1972, Ole's son Odd Reitan started his own shop. He had returned from his education at the Retailing institute (Kjøpmannsinstituttet, now BI Retail) in Bærum outside Oslo, and started the shop Sjokkpris ("shock price") in St. Olav's street in Trondheim. Father and son ran the business together as partners, and more shops were opened during the 70s. Based on an idea from abroad, Odd Reitan then established the retail chain REMA 1000 (REitan MAt, "Reitan food") in 1979. The chain concept consisted of a standardised range of goods (in principle 1,000), a simple shop design and low prices. REMA 1000 was a breakthrough for discount grocery chains in Norway.

In 1994, the first REMA 1000 store opened in Denmark. In 1995, Reitan Eiendom was established.

In 2000, Rema 1000 and Narvesen merged. In coming years Reitan took control over Reitan Narvesen AS and in 2004 Reitan Convenience was in charge of the brands Narvesen and 7-Eleven. In 2006, Reitan bought Hydro Texaco in Norway and Denmark and established a focused corporate structure based on the Uno-X and YX station networks in each country. In 2007, Reitan Convenience cooperated with Shell and the convenience part of the gas stations became 7-Eleven. In 2012, Reitan Convenience bought R-Kioski with stores in Finland, Estonia and Latvia and Lietuvos Spauda in Lithuania. In 2016, the fifth business area, Reitan Kapital was established.

In 2017, The first YX/7-Eleven opened in Norway. In 2019, Reitan Convenience bought Caffeine Roasters with stores in Estonia, Latvia and Lithuania. In 2019, after three years of refurbishing, Odd Reitan fulfill his childhood dream by opening Britannia Hotel, a five star hotel in Trondheim.

In 2021, Reitangruppen changed its name to Reitan. At the same time, five business areas became three: Reitan Retail, Reitan Eiendom and Reitan Kapital.
