= REMA 1000 =

Norwegian multinational discount grocery chain owned by Reitan Group

- Type: Discount shop
- Founded: 15 February, 1979; 47 years ago in Trondheim, Norway
- Founder: Odd Reitan
- Headquarters: Oslo, Norway
- Number of locations: 980 (2023)
- Area served: Norway, Denmark
- Revenue: NOK 28.3 billion €2.8 billion (2022)
- Owner: REITAN
- Number of employees: 20,252 (2016)
- Website: www.rema.no

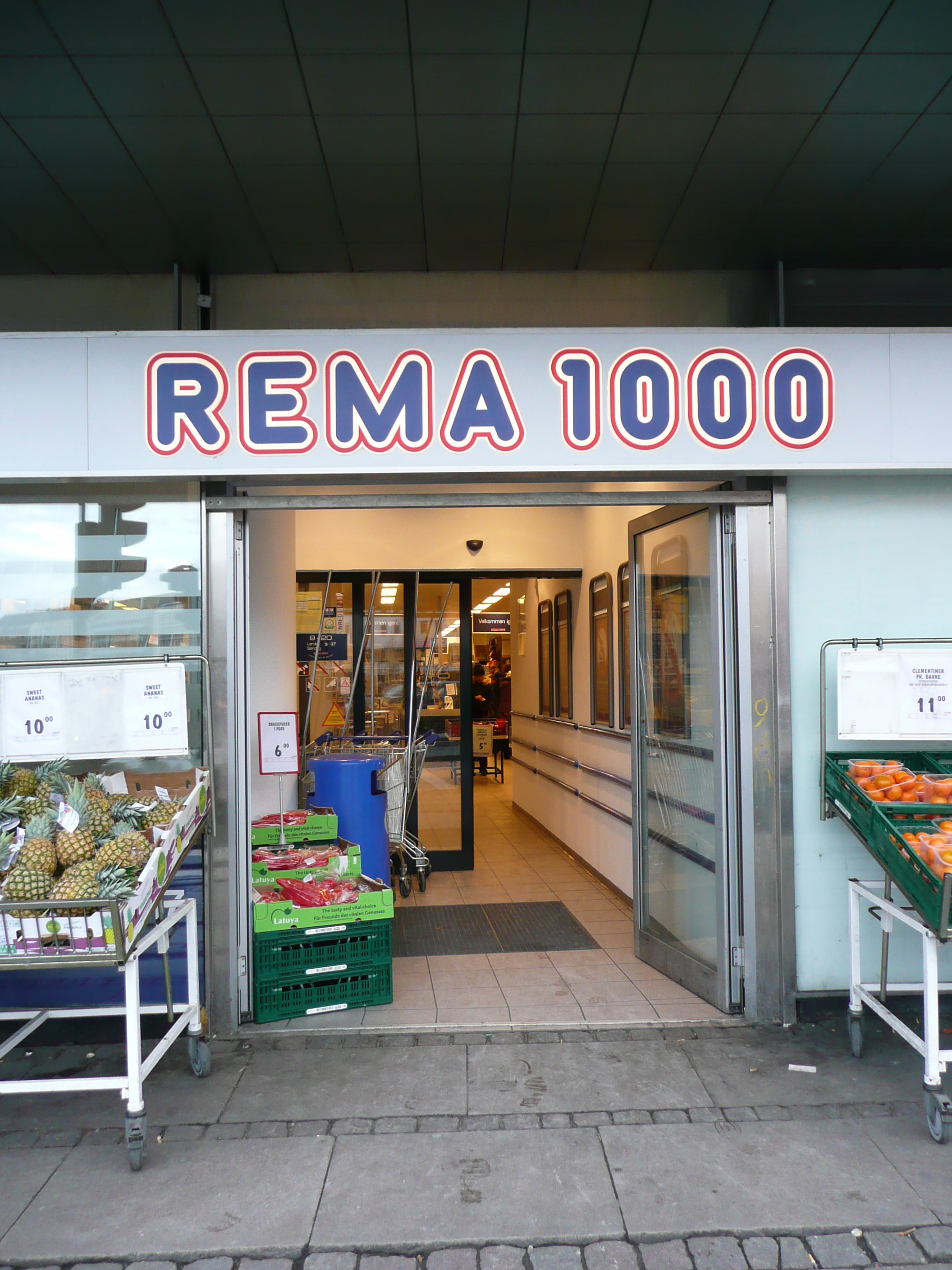
REMA 1000 shop at Vesterport Copenhagen, Denmark

REMA 1000 (Bokmål: Rema tusen) is a Norwegian multinational no-frills soft-discount grocery chain owned entirely by REITAN. REMA is a short for Reitan Mat (Reitan Food), referring to Odd Reitan (founder of the company). 1000 refers to offering a selection of only one thousand different products (see the history section).

With their headquarters located in Oslo, Norway, REMA 1000 includes businesses in Norway and Denmark. The chain is based on a franchised discount concept: buying large quantities of a limited range of products and offering these to semi-independent owners under their brand. By the end of 2016, Rema 1000 had a total of 868 shops spread across Norway and Denmark.

By 2016, the retailer captured 24.2% of the total revenue by all Norwegian grocers, taking the lead over its closest rival Kiwi.

In July 2023, a YouGov poll found that it was the preferred supermarket in Denmark.

== The shops ==
REMA 1000 shops are known for not spending large sums on aesthetics. As a matter of fact one of the chain's slogans is "The simple is often the best" (Norwegian: "Det enkle er ofte det beste") and this reflects on the layout concept in the shops. Products are often positioned by crate or even by pallet to save the cost of positioning them in a more attractive way, a strategy not unique to REMA. It is still REMA 1000's official policy of not letting cost-saving damage the basic idea of simplicity (in accordance with the slogan). Wide corridors and informative signs are therefore present to simplify the shopping.

== History ==
Odd Reitan, the founder of the company, opened the first REMA shop in Trondheim, Norway, 15 February 1979. Originally some shops were named 'REMA 600', indicating its breadth of food variety (later to be expanded). The owners had recently visited Germany where they had been impressed by the Albrecht brothers (Theo and Karl) hard-discount chain ALDI's success. They wanted to adapt the ALDI concept to Norwegian conditions.

Originally REMA attempted success with a selection of only 500–600 different products, but soon realised that this selection was too narrow. The success of the third REMA shop (opened in Mo i Rana, 8 May 1980) with a selection of 1,000 different products, paved way for the REMA 1000 brand. Since then, REMA 1000 have expanded their selection to more than 2,500 different products, but the name does not reflect this development.

In 2004, the chain celebrated its 25-year anniversary.

In August 2023, it was announced the Danish Competition and Consumer Authority had approved REMA 1000's acquisition of 114 Aldi stores in Denmark.

=== Animal welfare ===
In April 2010, REMA 1000 decided to stop selling eggs from cage hens by the year 2012, to coincide with the scheduled EU-wide prohibition on battery cages.

REMA 1000 met the Better Chicken Commitment, adopting higher welfare standards for broiler chickens across its Norwegian supply, ahead of their 2026 deadline.

== Countries with REMA 1000 shops ==
Shops	Country	Employees	Revenue	Market share	Debut year	Comment
681 (2024)	Norway	20,252 (2016)	NOK 17,621 mill (▲4.6%) (2004)	24.2% (2016)	1979	Headquarters are located in Oslo
363 (2023)	Denmark	14,000+ (2023)	NOK 2,935 mill (▲10.2%) (2004)	15% (2020)	1994	Danish headquarters are located in Horsens
0	Sweden	—	—	—	2003	Only in Svinesund, close to the Norwegian border, closed in 2012
0	Slovakia	—	—	—	1993	sold in 2003
0	Poland	—	—	—	1993	sold in 2003
0	Hungary	—	—	—	1998	sold in 2002
