= Baltic pipeline =

Baltic pipeline may refer to:

- Balticconnector, a gas pipeline between Estonia and Finland
- Baltic Gas Interconnector, a planned gas pipeline between Germany, Denmark and Sweden
- Baltic Pipe, a gas pipeline between Denmark and Poland
- Baltic Pipeline System, a Russian oil transport system
- Nord Stream 1, an operating gas pipeline between Russia and Germany
