= Skanled =

Location
- Country: Norway; Sweden; Denmark
- Direction: north–south
- Start: Kårstø, Norway
- Passes through: Rafnes; Lysekil; Vallby Kile; Bua
- To: Jutland, Denmark

General information
- Type: natural gas
- Owner: Skanled Project Group
- Partners: Petoro; Skagerak Energi; E.ON Ruhrgas; PGNiG; Energinet.dk; VNG - Verbundnetz Gas AG; Gasunie; Göteborg Energi
- Operator: Gassco
- Expected: suspended

Technical information
- Maximum discharge: 7 billion cubic meter per year

Skanled was a planned natural gas offshore pipeline connecting Norway to Sweden and Denmark.

== Technical features ==
The submarine pipeline was to start in the Kårstø natural gas processing plant in western Norway, where it was to be connected with the Europipe II. It was to be run to eastern Norway, western Sweden and Denmark with exit points in Rafnes (Norway), Lysekil, Vallby Kile, Bua (Sweden) and Jutland (Denmark). It consist of:

- A 24 inches (610 mm) or 26 inches (660 mm) gas pipeline from Kårstø to Rafnes
- Ethane injection facilities at Kårstø
- Ethane extraction facilities at Rafnes
- A 20 inches (510 mm) or 22 inches (560 mm) gas pipeline from Rafnes with branches to pressure reduction stations in Sweden and Denmark.

As part of the project, the pipeline was to transport also ethane, which would injected into the natural gas at Kårstø and transported with the natural gas to Rafnes, where it would separated and extracted from the gas. The separation facilities at Rafnes and the installations downstream the reduction stations in Sweden and Denmark were not part of the project.

The originally planned capacity of the pipeline was 6 billion cubic meter (bcm) of natural gas per year. The plans were upgraded to 7 bcm. The likelihood of greater future demand from Denmark and Poland, which plan to connect Skanled through Denmark with other planned pipeline, the Baltic Pipe between Denmark and Poland, may lead to widen the diameter of the pipe from the initial design.

The pipeline was to be operational by October 2012. It was designed for 50 years of operation. It expected to cost 10 billion Norwegian kroner.

== Suspension ==
The final investment decision depended on decisions by Yara International and Ineos, major potential consumers of gas provided by Skanled. In April 2009, the Skanled Project Group announced that they had decided to suspend the project "due to increased commercial risk combined with the global economic developments that have given an uncertain view on future gas demand."

== Contractors ==
The IKM Gruppen was selected for design activities related to the pipeline system with associated subsea structures, landfalls, and receiving and metering stations.

== Project company ==
The project was developed by the Skanled Project Group. Shareholders of the consortium were:

- Petoro
- Skagerak Energi
- E.ON Ruhrgas
- PGNiG
- Energinet.dk
- VNG - Verbundnetz Gas AG

Gasunie accepted the invitation to join the project to replace Swedegas and, in part, Göteborg Energi in the consortium.

The project was managed by Gassco with Swedegas and Energinet.dk participating as partners. The Skanled project director is Thor Otto Lohne.
