= Miechowice Duże =

- Village
- Location within Poland
- Coordinates: 52°37′13″N 18°50′25″E
- Country: Poland
- Voivodeship: Kuyavian-Pomeranian
- County: Włocławek
- Gmina: Brześć Kujawski

Miechowice Duże [mjɛxɔˈvit͡sɛ ˈduʐɛ] is a village in the administrative district of Gmina Brześć Kujawski, within Włocławek County, Kuyavian-Pomeranian Voivodeship, in north-central Poland.
