= Witoldowo, Gmina Brześć Kujawski =

Witoldowo
- Village
- Location within Poland
- Coordinates: 52°41′57″N 18°52′47″E
- Country: Poland
- Voivodeship: Kuyavian-Pomeranian
- County: Włocławek
- Gmina: Brześć Kujawski

Witoldowo [vitɔlˈdɔvɔ] is a village in the administrative district of Gmina Brześć Kujawski, within Włocławek County, Kuyavian-Pomeranian Voivodeship, in north-central Poland.
