= Wieniec, Włocławek County =

Wieniec
- Village
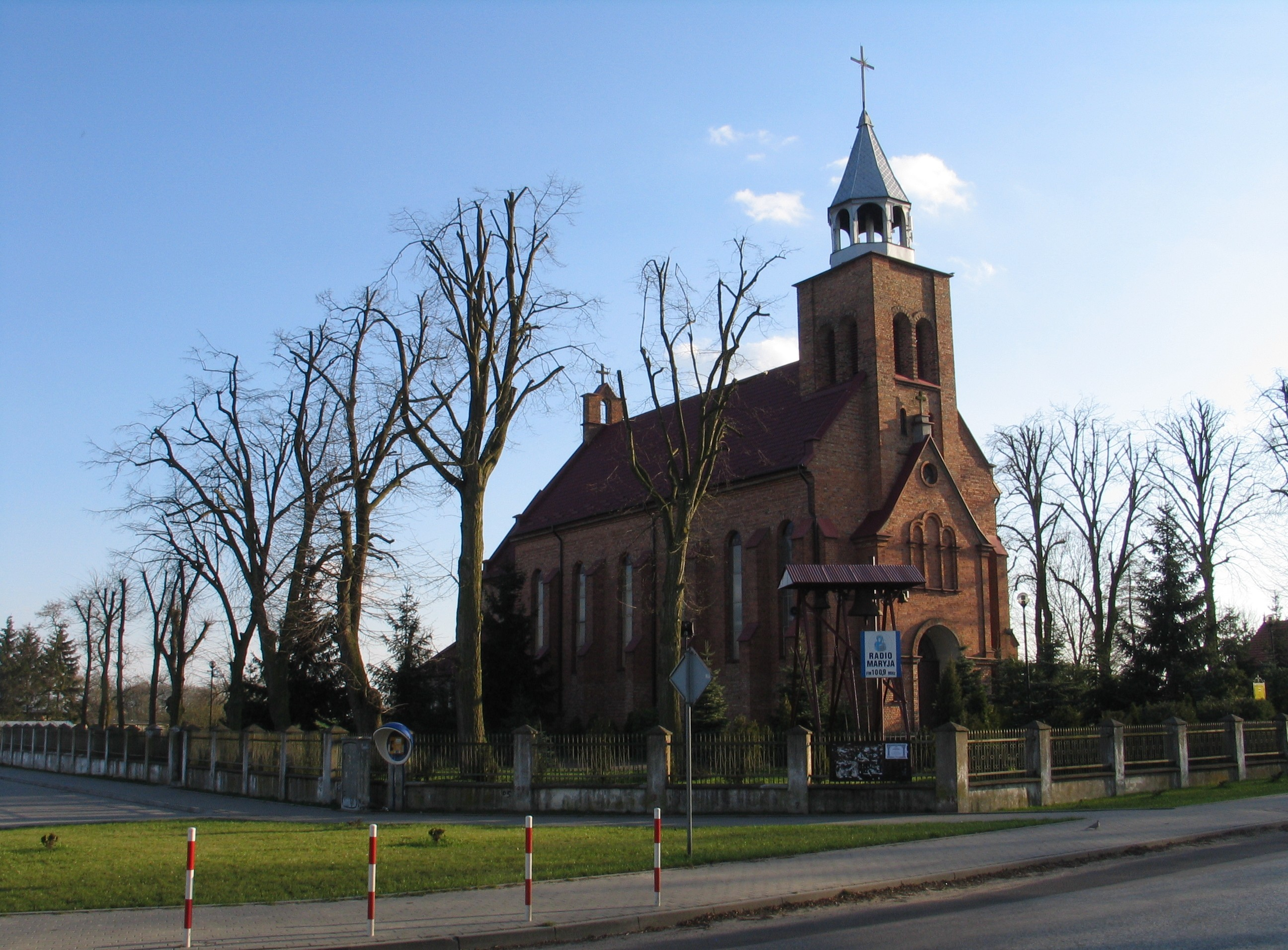

- Location within Poland
- Coordinates: 52°38′58″N 18°55′51″E
- Country: Poland
- Voivodeship: Kuyavian-Pomeranian
- County: Włocławek
- Gmina: Brześć Kujawski
- Population: 790

Wieniec [ˈvjɛɲɛt͡s] is a village in the administrative district of Gmina Brześć Kujawski, within Włocławek County, Kuyavian-Pomeranian Voivodeship, in north-central Poland.
