= Pikutkowo =

- Village
- Location within Poland
- Coordinates: 52°37′15″N 18°57′11″E
- Country: Poland
- Voivodeship: Kuyavian-Pomeranian
- County: Włocławek
- Gmina: Brześć Kujawski
- Population: 250

Pikutkowo [pikutˈkɔvɔ] is a village in the administrative district of Gmina Brześć Kujawski, within Włocławek County, Kuyavian-Pomeranian Voivodeship, in north-central Poland.
