= Börnicke =

- Ortsteil of Nauen
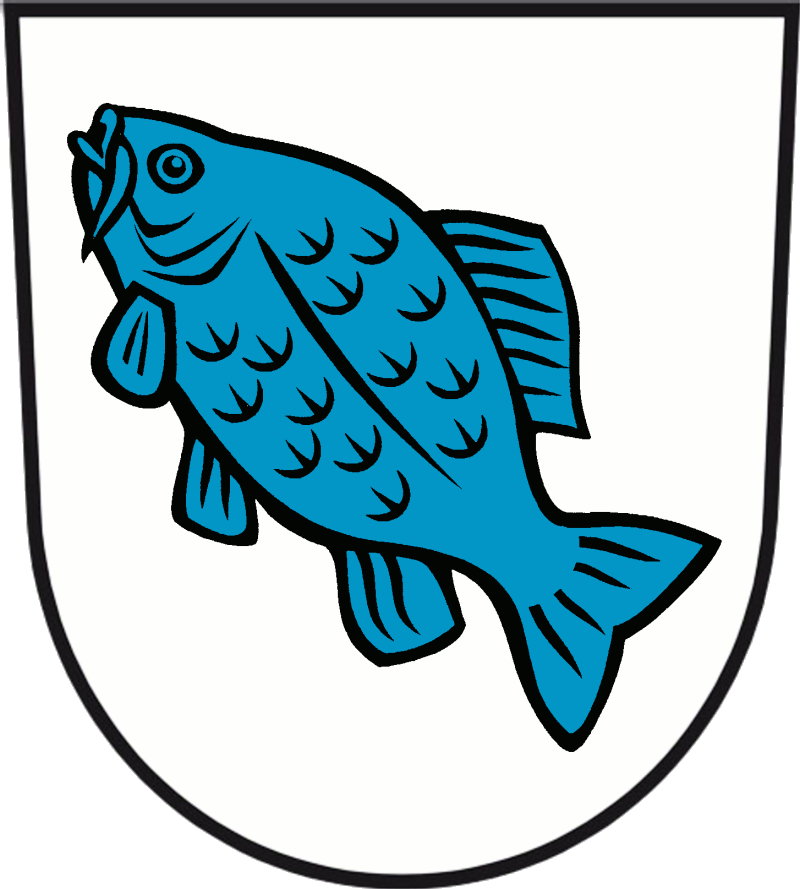
- Coat of arms
- Interactive map of Börnicke
- Location within Germany Location within Brandenburg
- Coordinates: 52°41′9″N 12°56′9″E
- Country: Germany
- State: Brandenburg
- Town: Nauen

Area
  - Total: 19.07 km^{2} (7.36 sq mi)
- Elevation: 34 m (112 ft)

Population (2017)
  - Total: 850
  - Density: 45/km^{2} (120/sq mi)
- Time zone: UTC+01:00 (CET)
  - Summer (DST): UTC+02:00 (CEST)
- Postal codes: 14641
- Dialling codes: 033230

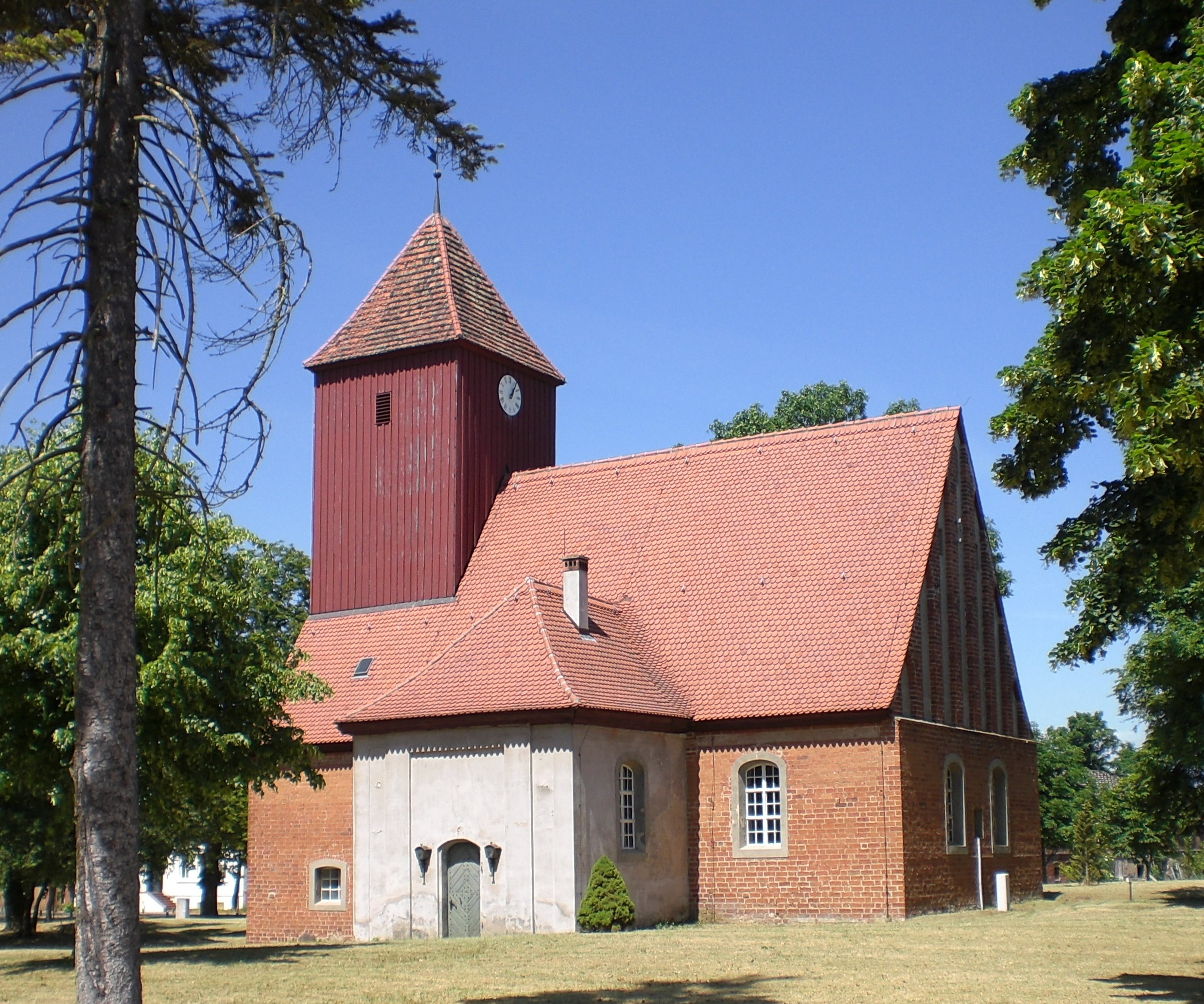
Evangelical-Lutheran chapel with steeple and clock in the village of Börnicke

Börnicke is a component locality (Ortsteil) of the town of Nauen in the Landkreis Havelland district of Brandenburg, Germany.

The Shlosspark Börnicke (Börnicke Palace Park), designed in the 20th century, is a local landmark. Another local landmark is the Dorfkirche (village church).

== Neighbouring towns ==
Neighbouring towns include Staffelde and Fehrbellin.

== Geography ==
Börnicke lies 34m above sea-level, 10 km north-east from the town Nauen. The town's area is around 19.07 km².

== History ==
The town's name is from the Eastphalian for "small well".
