= Parcele Sokołowskie =

- Village
- Location within Poland
- Coordinates: 52°34′11″N 18°55′13″E
- Country: Poland
- Voivodeship: Kuyavian-Pomeranian
- County: Włocławek
- Gmina: Brześć Kujawski

Parcele Sokołowskie [parˈt͡sɛlɛ sɔkɔˈwɔfskʲɛ] is a village in the administrative district of Gmina Brześć Kujawski, within Włocławek County, Kuyavian-Pomeranian Voivodeship, in north-central Poland.
