= Machnacz, Kuyavian-Pomeranian Voivodeship =

Machnacz
- Village
- Location within Poland
- Coordinates: 52°38′55″N 18°57′0″E
- Country: Poland
- Voivodeship: Kuyavian-Pomeranian
- County: Włocławek
- Gmina: Brześć Kujawski

Machnacz [ˈmaxnat͡ʂ] is a village in the administrative district of Gmina Brześć Kujawski, within Włocławek County, Kuyavian-Pomeranian Voivodeship, in north-central Poland.
