= Świnoujście LNG terminal =

LNG terminal in Poland

Coordinates: 53°54′33″N 14°17′41″E

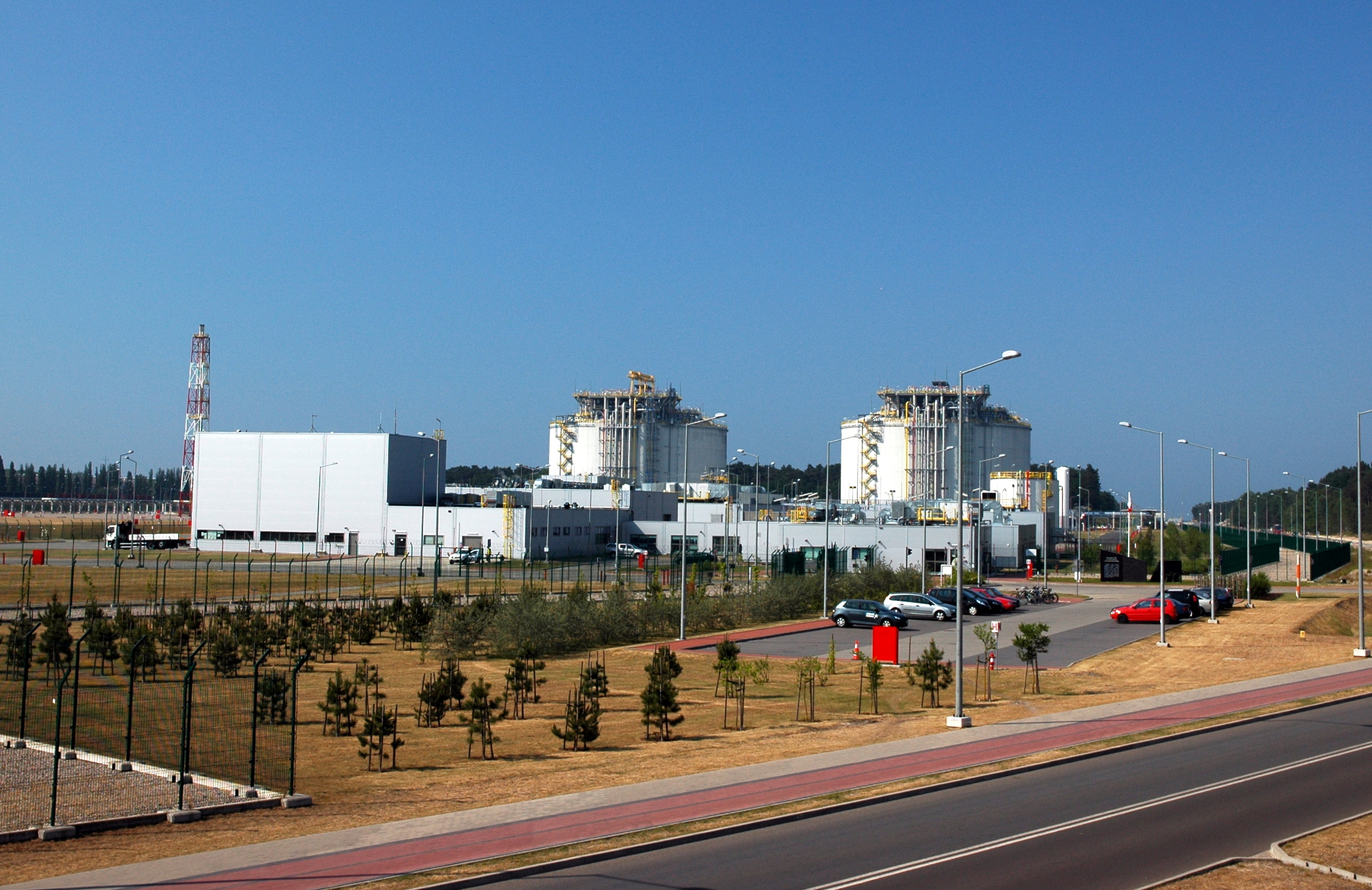
The Świnoujście LNG Terminal in 2018

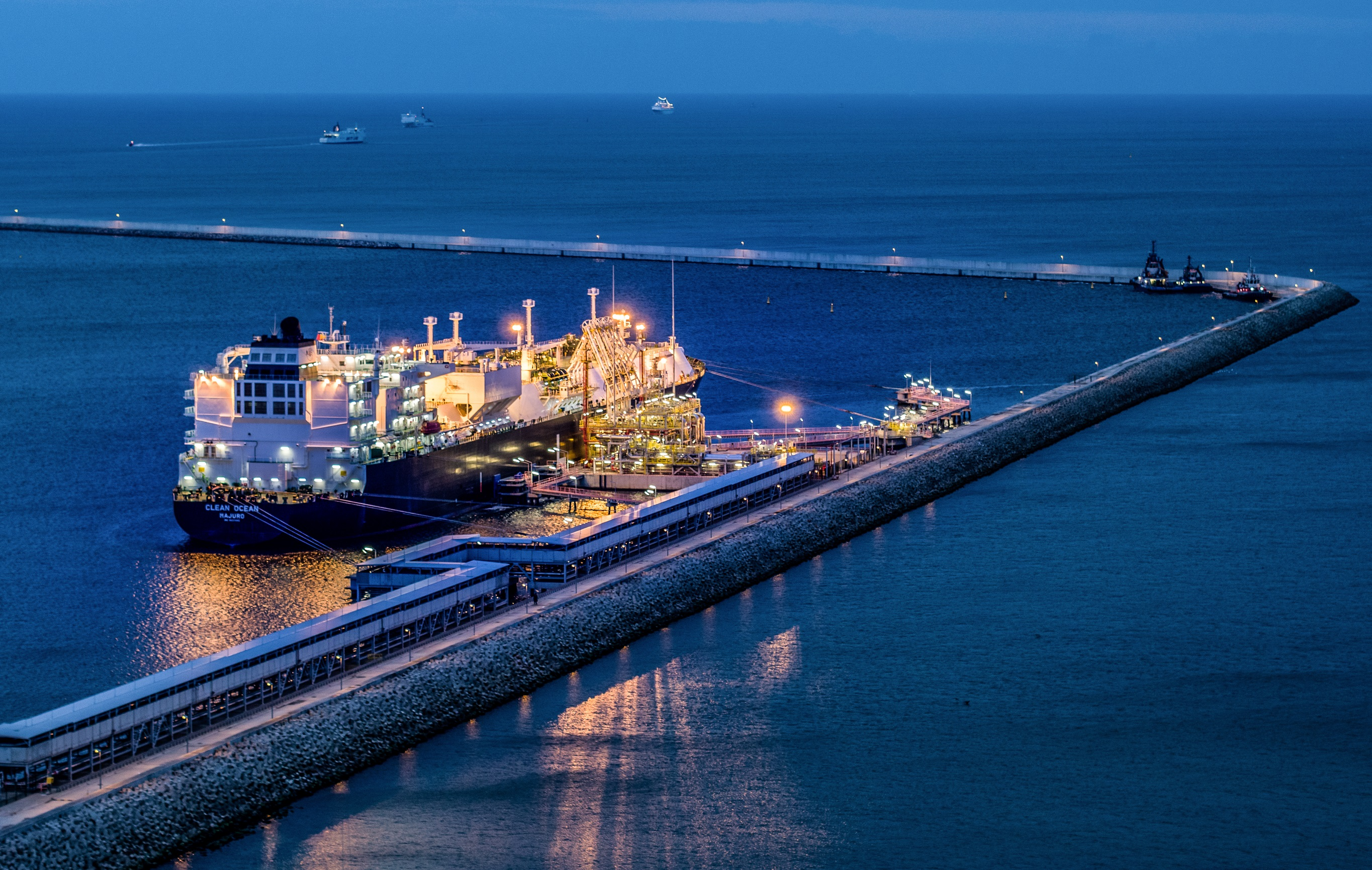
A tanker docked at the terminal in 2020

The Świnoujście LNG terminal (also referred as Terminal LNG in Świnoujście, Polskie LNG Baltic LNG, or gazoport) is a liquefied natural gas (LNG) import terminal at Świnoujście, in the extreme north-west of Poland near the Polish-German border. The LNG terminal was operated by Polskie LNG S.A. (a subsidiary of Gaz-System), then by Gaz-System since 2022. The cornerstone for construction was laid on 23 March 2011 and it took its first LNG delivery on 11 December 2015. The terminal's regasification capacity is 5 billion cubic metres per annum (180 billion cubic feet per annum). The terminal is currently being expanded and once the expansion is complete in 2023, it will have a capacity of 7.5 billion cubic metres per annum (260 billion cubic feet per annum) and be able to satisfy about half of Poland's annual natural gas demand. Together with the 10 bcm of natural gas that Poland will (starting in 2023) receive annually from Norway via the Baltic Pipe natural gas pipeline, the Świnoujście LNG terminal will allow Poland to achieve its long-term goal of becoming fully independent of Russian natural gas, which had previously been the source of almost all of the country's natural gas.

== History ==
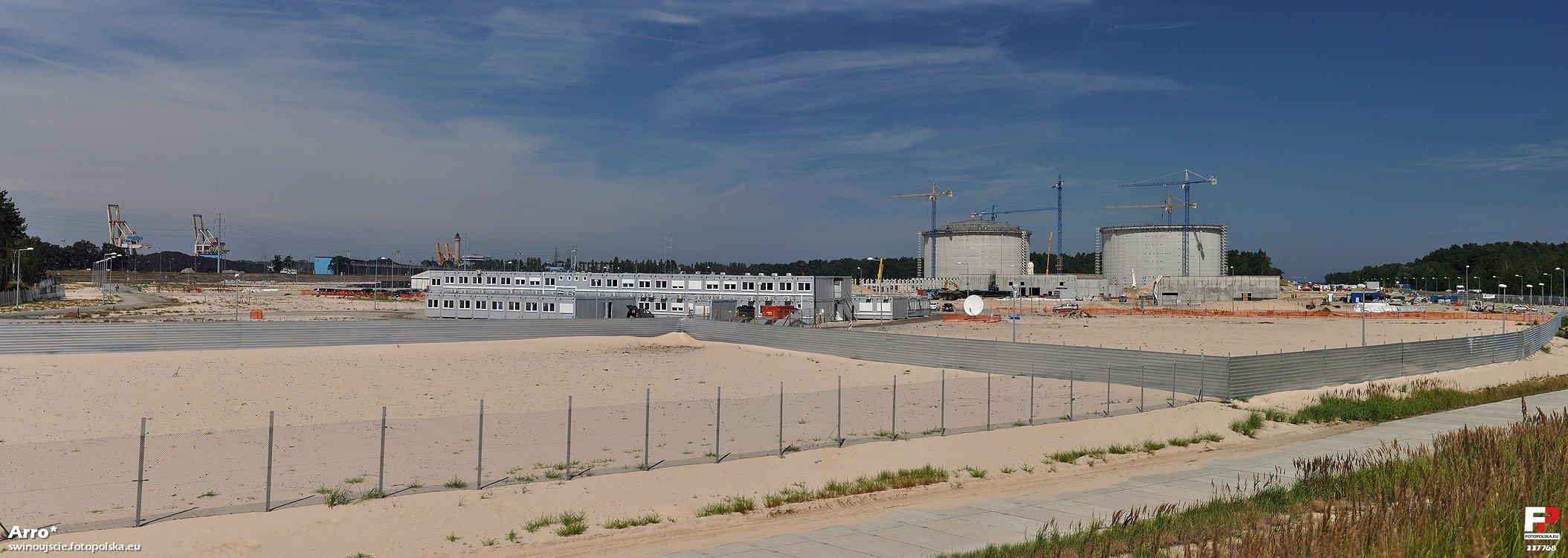
Construction of the Świnoujście LNG terminal

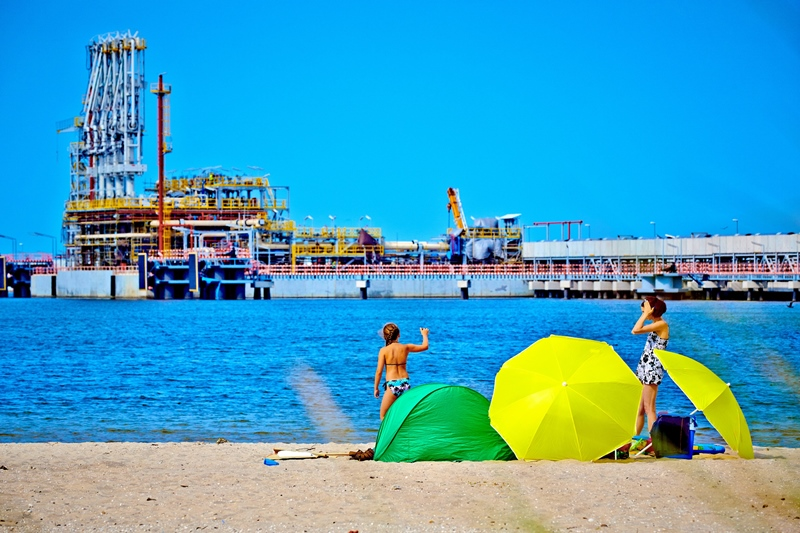
The terminal seen from the beach in 2014

Discussions about the project started in 2006. The project was originally developed by PGNiG through its subsidiary Polskie LNG S.A. In January 2008, SNC-Lavalin was chosen for the front-end engineering design. The engineering, procurement and construction contract was signed with a consortium of Saipem, Techint, Snamprogetti, and PBG. Construction started in March 2011. The first LNG delivery to the terminal was expected on 11 December 2015. After creation of Gaz-System and its separation from PGNiG, the newly created company took over the ownership of Polskie LNG S.A. The terminal was inaugurated by prime minister Ewa Kopacz on 12 October 2015. The gas carrier has delivered the first order on 11 December 2015.

The total cost of the terminal is €950 million (PLN 3.638 billion), including PLN 888 million in grants, subsidies, and loans from the European Union.

== Technical description ==
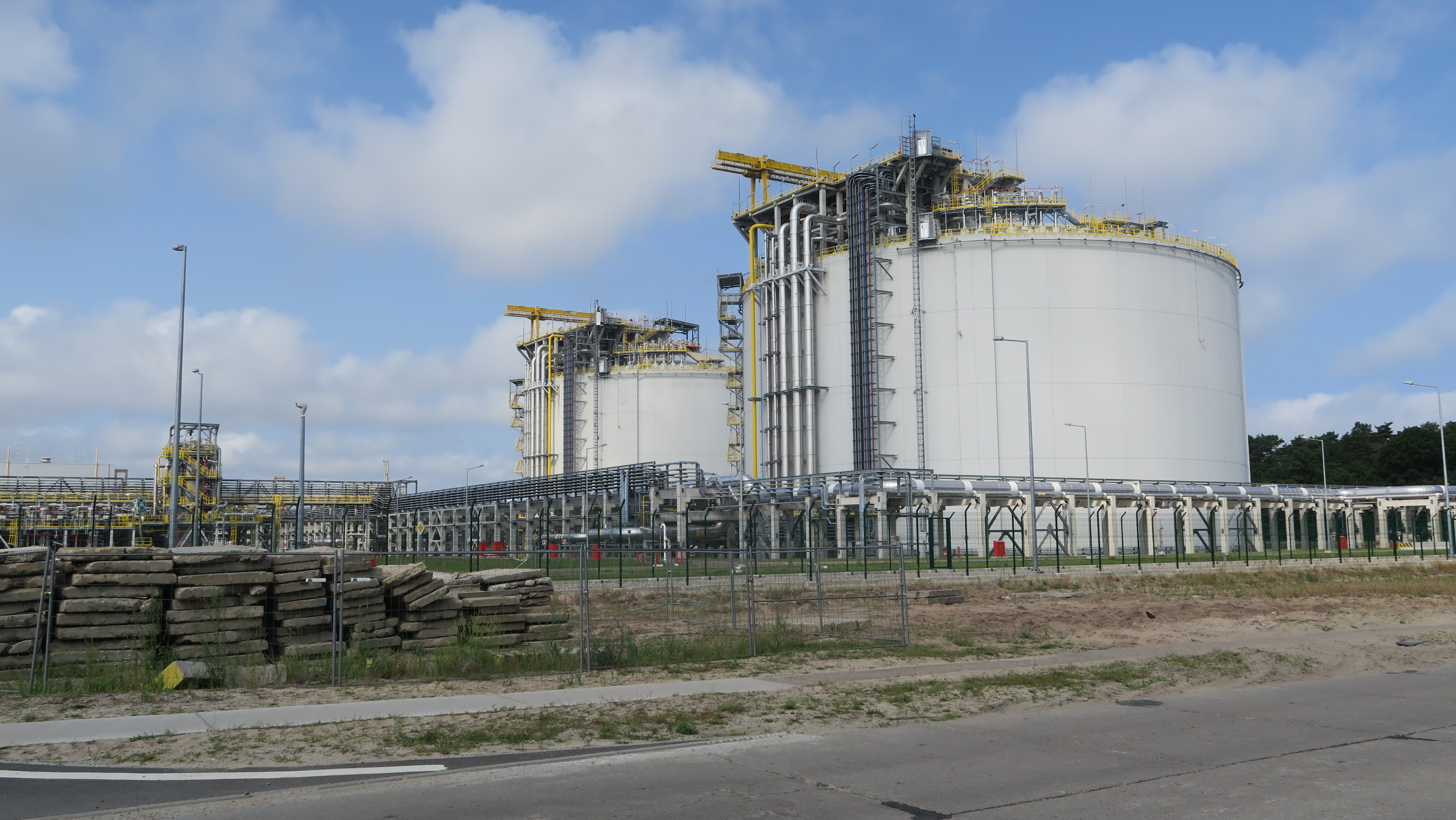
Storage tanks in 2016

The terminal has unloading jetty for large LNG tankers, two storage tanks and regasification train. The terminal's initial regasification capacity is 5 billion cubic metres per annum (180 billion cubic feet per annum), and this is expected to reach 7.5 billion cubic metres per annum (260 billion cubic feet per annum) in 2023 once its expansion is complete.

== Expansion ==
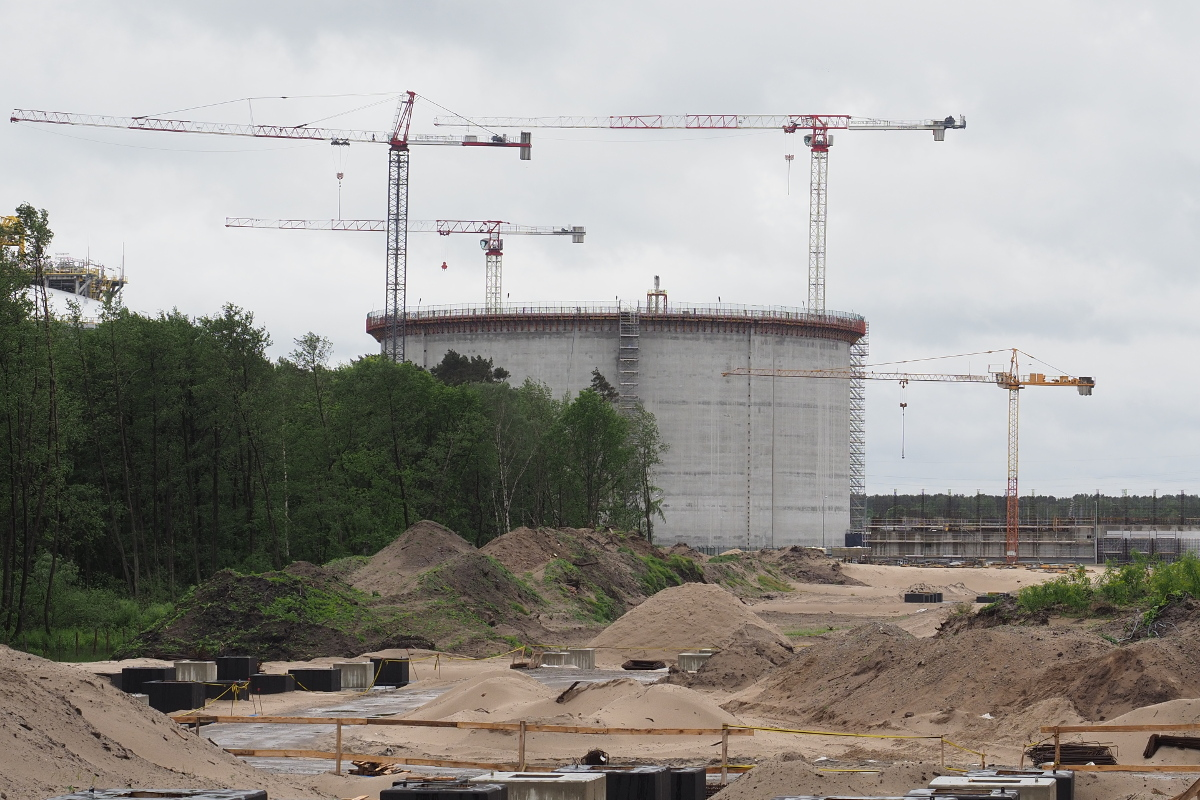
Construction of the third storage tank in 2022

In June 2020, Polskie LNG and the Szczecin and Świnoujście Seaports Authority signed agreements with the consortium of PORR SA and TGE Gas Engineering GmbH for the expansion of the LNG terminal. The construction of the third tank will increase the terminal's capacity from 5 billion cubic metres per annum (180 billion cubic feet per annum) to 7.5 billion cubic metres per annum (260 billion cubic feet per annum), satisfying approximately 50% of Poland's annual gas demand. The agreements concern the expansion of the land and sea parts of the terminal. Polskie LNG will be responsible, inter alia, for the construction of a new LNG tank with a capacity of approximately 180 thousand cubic metres (6.4 million cubic feet) and construction of the technological part of the new ship berth for unloading, loading and bunkering LNG. Upon completion of the works, the nominal regasification capacity of the terminal will increase to 7.5 billion cubic metres per annum (260 billion cubic feet per annum). The construction of the third tank is expected to be completed by 2023 and will cost approximately PLN 1.9 billion.

There is a plan to create a gas corridor from the Świnoujście terminal to Adria LNG terminal in Croatia,. A pipeline between Poland and Slovakia was opened in 2022.

== See also ==
- 2022 Russia–European Union gas dispute – Fossil fuel financing-related conflicts
- Baltic Pipe – Natural gas pipeline from Europipe II to Poland
- Energy in Poland
- Gas Interconnection Poland–Lithuania – Natural gas pipeline
- Klaipėda LNG terminal – LNG terminal in Lithuania
- List of LNG terminals
