= Stary Brześć =

- Village
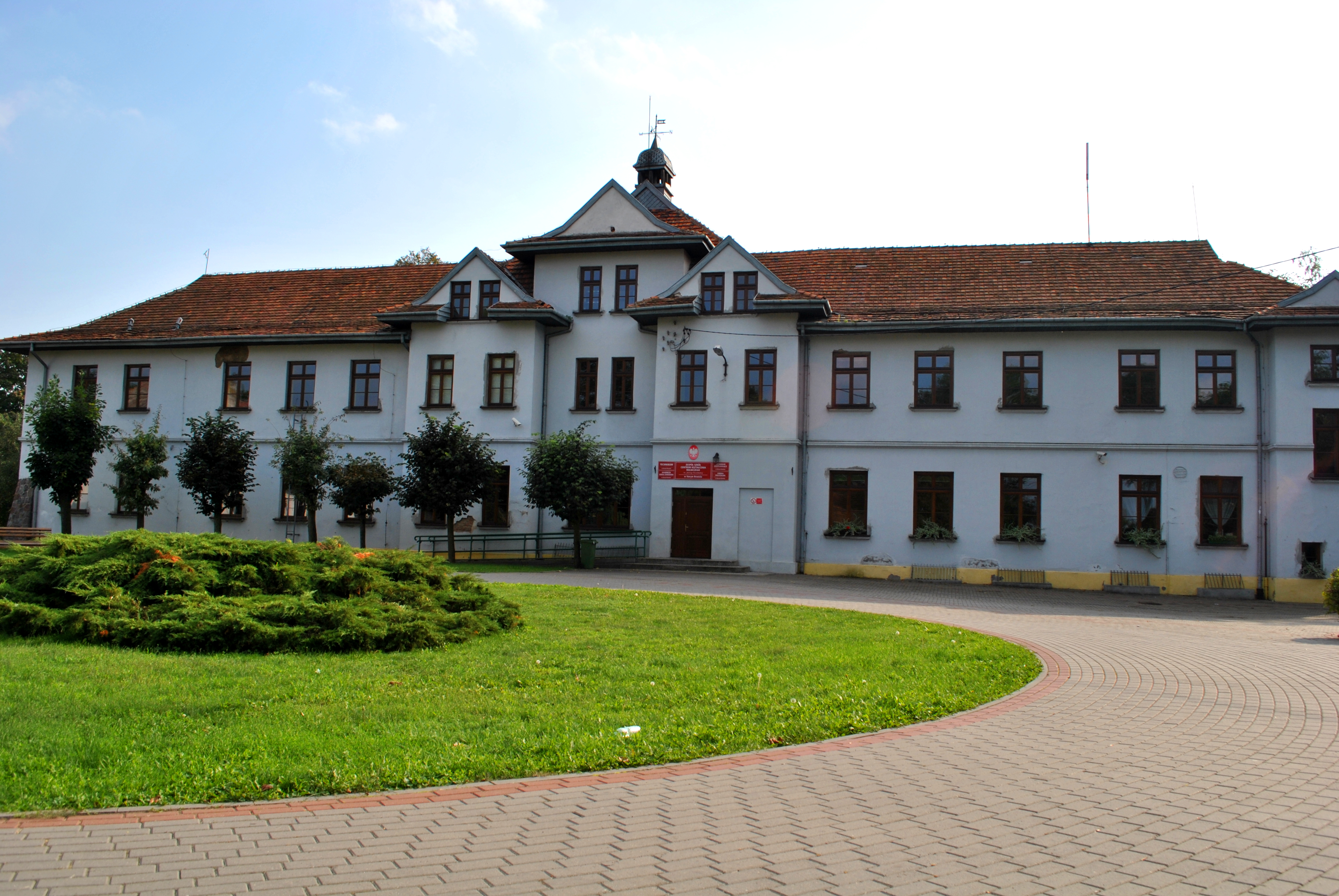

- Location within Poland
- Coordinates: 52°37′18″N 18°54′03″E
- Country: Poland
- Voivodeship: Kuyavian-Pomeranian
- County: Włocławek
- Gmina: Brześć Kujawski

Stary Brześć [ˈstarɨ ˈbʐɛɕt͡ɕ] is a village in the administrative district of Gmina Brześć Kujawski, within Włocławek County, Kuyavian-Pomeranian Voivodeship, in north-central Poland.
