= Wieniec-Zdrój =

- Spa
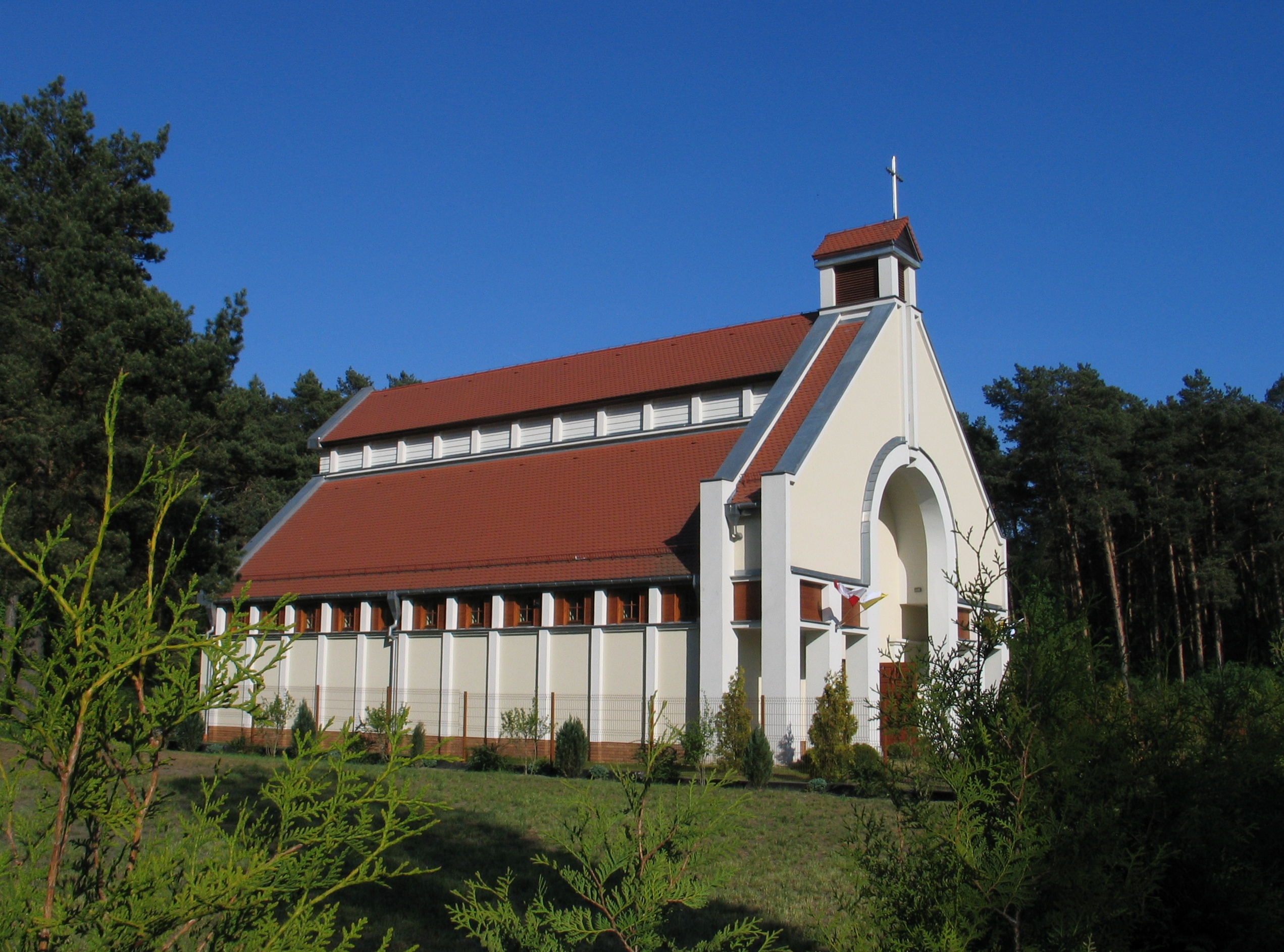
- Divine Mercy church in Wieniec-Zdrój

- Location within Poland
- Coordinates: 52°39′24″N 18°59′18″E
- Country: Poland
- Voivodeship: Kuyavian-Pomeranian
- County: Włocławek
- Gmina: Brześć Kujawski
- Population: 120

Wieniec-Zdrój [ˈvjɛɲɛt͡s ˈzdrui̯] is a spa in the administrative district of Gmina Brześć Kujawski, within Włocławek County, Kuyavian-Pomeranian Voivodeship, in central Poland.

== History ==
Following the joint German-Soviet invasion of Poland, which started World War II in September 1939, the village was occupied by Germany. Shortly before their withdrawal, on January 18, 1945, the Germans committed a massacre of nine Poles in Wieniec-Zdrój (see Nazi crimes against the Polish nation).
