= Miechowice, Włocławek County =

Miechowice
- Village
- Location within Poland
- Coordinates: 52°38′N 18°50′E
- Country: Poland
- Voivodeship: Kuyavian-Pomeranian
- County: Włocławek
- Gmina: Brześć Kujawski

Miechowice [mjɛxɔˈvit͡sɛ] is a village in the administrative district of Gmina Brześć Kujawski, within Włocławek County, Kuyavian-Pomeranian Voivodeship, in north-central Poland.
