= Brzezie, Kuyavian-Pomeranian Voivodeship =

Brzezie
- Village
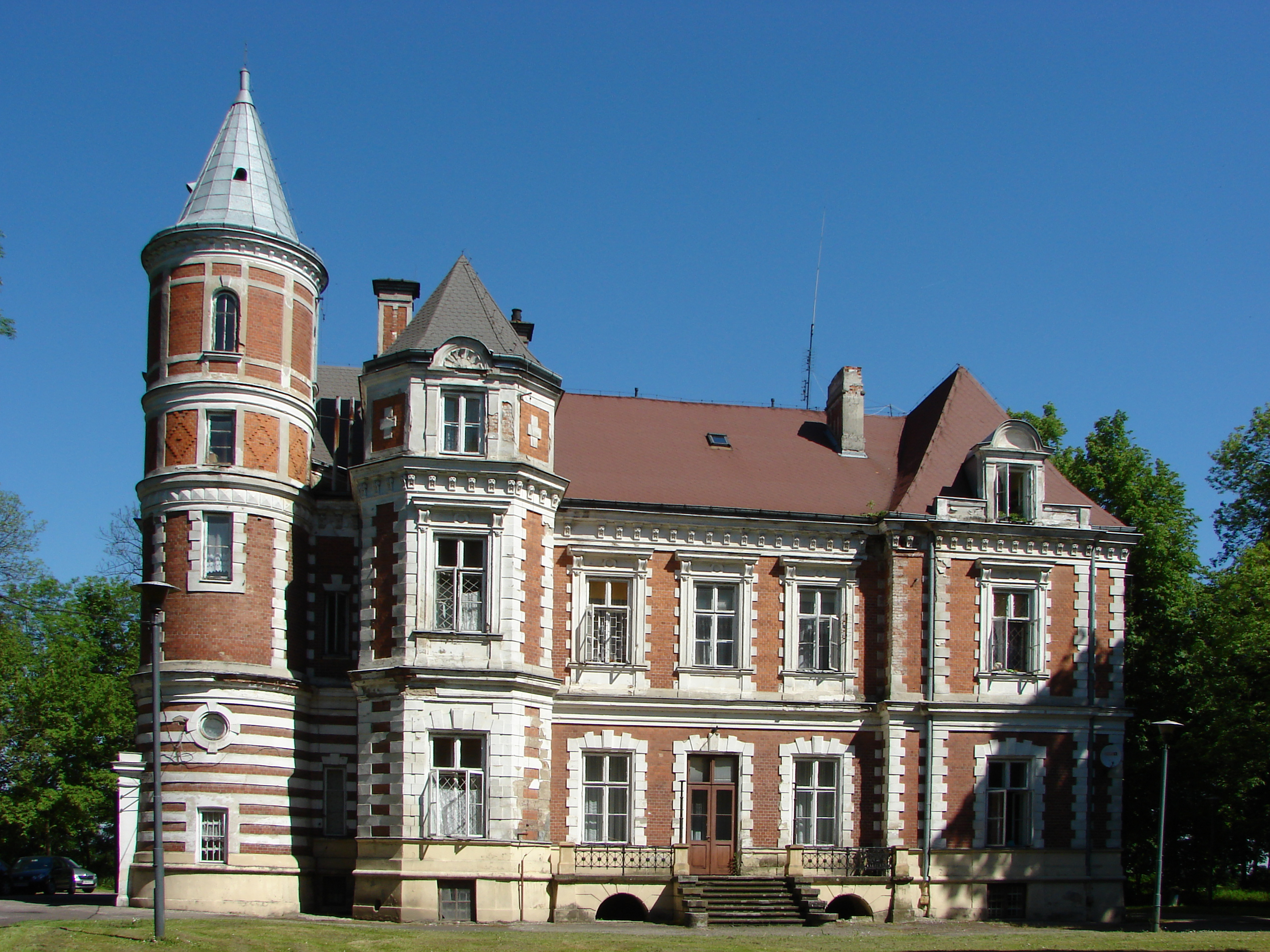
- The Kronenberg Palace, built 1873.

- Location within Poland
- Coordinates: 52°41′16″N 18°53′18″E
- Country: Poland
- Voivodeship: Kuyavian-Pomeranian
- County: Włocławek
- Gmina: Brześć Kujawski

Brzezie [ˈbʐɛʑɛ] is a village in the administrative district of Gmina Brześć Kujawski, within Włocławek County, Kuyavian-Pomeranian Voivodeship, in north-central Poland.
