= Kąkowa Wola =

- Village
- Location within Poland
- Coordinates: 52°35′47″N 18°49′27″E
- Country: Poland
- Voivodeship: Kuyavian-Pomeranian
- County: Włocławek
- Gmina: Brześć Kujawski

Kąkowa Wola [kɔnˈkɔva ˈvɔla] is a village in the administrative district of Gmina Brześć Kujawski, within Włocławek County, Kuyavian-Pomeranian Voivodeship, in north-central Poland.
