= Kąkowa Wola-Parcele =

- Village
- Location within Poland
- Coordinates: 52°35′00″N 18°49′00″E
- Country: Poland
- Voivodeship: Kuyavian-Pomeranian
- County: Włocławek
- Gmina: Brześć Kujawski

Kąkowa Wola-Parcele [kɔnˈkɔva ˈvɔla parˈt͡sɛlɛ] is a village in the administrative district of Gmina Brześć Kujawski, within Włocławek County, Kuyavian-Pomeranian Voivodeship, in north-central Poland.
