= Aleksandrowo, Włocławek County =

Aleksandrowo
- Village
- Location within Poland
- Coordinates: 52°40′28″N 18°52′21″E
- Country: Poland
- Voivodeship: Kuyavian-Pomeranian
- County: Włocławek
- Gmina: Brześć Kujawski
- Time zone: UTC+1 (CET)
  - Summer (DST): UTC+2 (CEST)
- Vehicle registration: CWL

Aleksandrowo [alɛksanˈdrɔvɔ] is a village in the administrative district of Gmina Brześć Kujawski, within Włocławek County, Kuyavian-Pomeranian Voivodeship, in central Poland.
