= Kąty, Gmina Brześć Kujawski =

Kąty
- Village
- Location within Poland
- Coordinates: 52°38′10″N 18°55′17″E
- Country: Poland
- Voivodeship: Kuyavian-Pomeranian
- County: Włocławek
- Gmina: Brześć Kujawski

Kąty [ˈkɔntɨ] is a village in the administrative district of Gmina Brześć Kujawski, within Włocławek County, Kuyavian-Pomeranian Voivodeship, in north-central Poland.
