= Baltic Pipe =

Natural gas pipeline from Europipe II to Poland

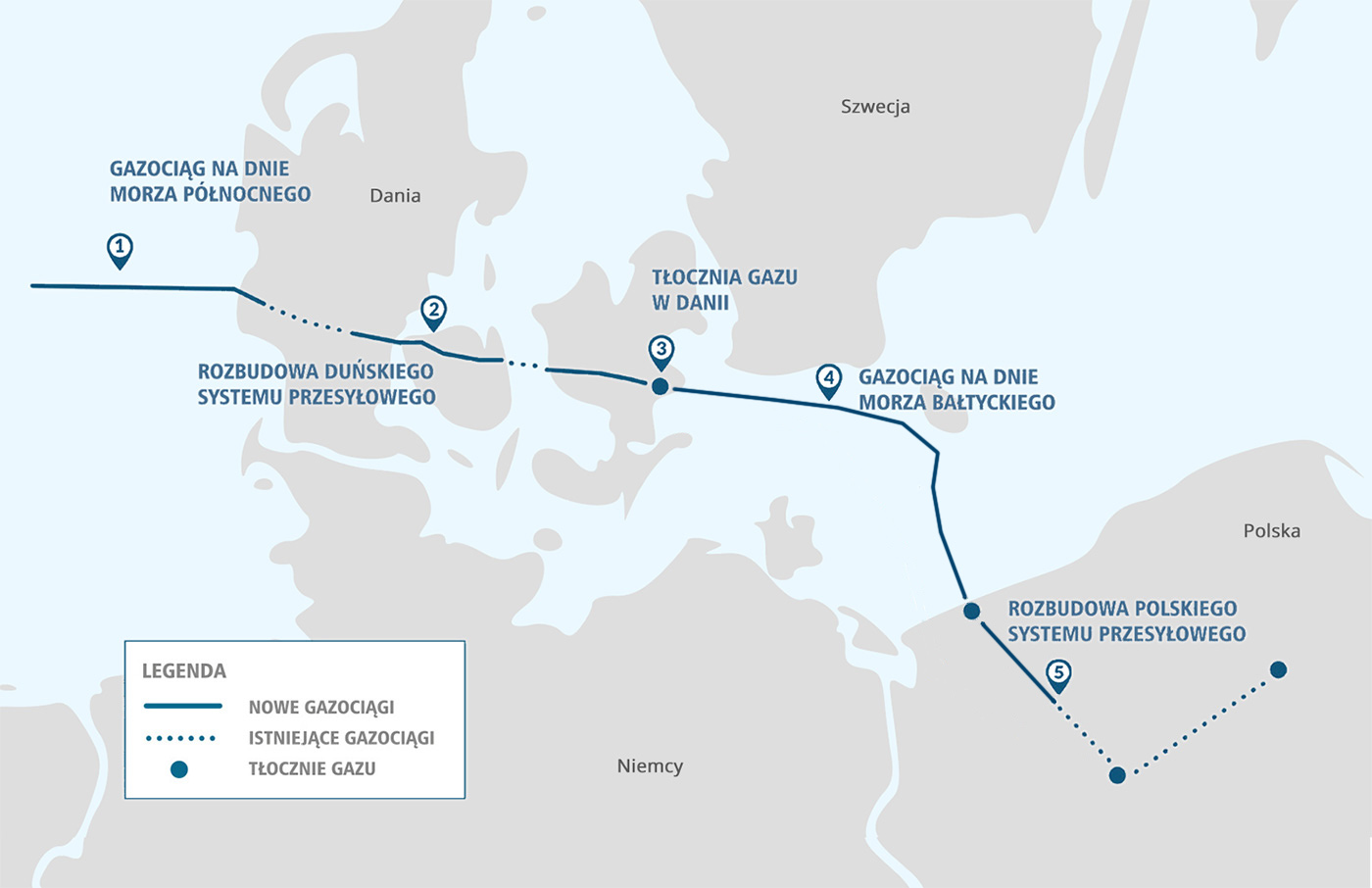
- Location of Baltic Pipe

Location
- Country: Norway; Denmark; Poland
- Start: Europipe II, North Sea
- Passes through: North Sea; Denmark; Baltic Sea
- To: Poland

General information
- Type: natural gas
- Operator: Energinet; Gaz-System
- Commissioned: 27 September — 30 November 2022

Technical information
- Length: 900 km (560 mi)
- Maximum discharge: 10 billion m^{3}/a (350 billion cu ft/a) (Norway–Denmark–Poland); 3 billion m^{3}/a (110 billion cu ft/a) (Poland–Denmark)

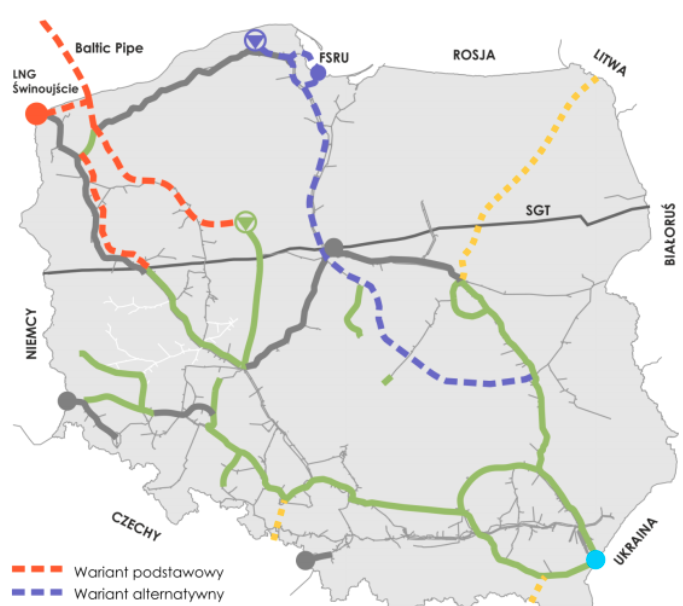
The target network of Polish gas pipelines

Polish electricity generation by source

The Baltic Pipe is a natural gas pipeline connecting Norway (through Europipe II), Denmark and Poland. It is a strategic infrastructure project to create a new European gas supply corridor.

The Baltic Pipe transports natural gas from the North Sea to Poland via Denmark at up to 10 billion cubic metres (350 billion cubic feet) per year. The project was developed by the Danish gas and electricity transmission system operator Energinet and the Polish gas transmission system operator Gaz-System. The project is recognised as a Project of Common Interest of the European Union.

The Baltic Pipe officially became operational on 27 September 2022.

== History ==
The project started in 2001, when Danish oil and gas company DONG and Polish oil and gas company PGNiG signed an agreement on construction of the pipeline and Danish gas supply to Poland. It was agreed to establish a pipeline consortium with two-thirds of the shares belonging to DONG and one-third to PGNiG with possible Statoil participation. However, shortly afterward the project was suspended, because of economic feasibility.

The project was revived in 2007. On 2 May 2007, PGNiG and Energinet, a Danish transmission system operator, which was taken over Danish natural gas transmission network from DONG, signed an agreement to explore the possibility of constructing the Baltic Pipe using Skanled as a feeder line from Norway. In August 2008, the Polish Government replaced PGNiG with the fully state-owned pipeline operator Gaz-System as the project partner.

On 18 May 2009, the European Commission launched a call for proposals for grants in the framework of the European Energy Programme for Recovery. It proposed to allocate about €150 million for implementation of Skanled and Baltic Pipe projects. The European Commission provided €3.2 million for technical design of the pipeline. However, on 16 June 2009 Gaz-System suspended the implementation of the project due to the suspension of the Skanled project and insufficient demand for natural gas in Poland. The project was reactivated by Poland in February 2010 after reviewal, to reduce its use of coal and eastern gas.

The current project was initiated in 2016 when a new feasibility study was conducted. The project was included in the first list of projects of common interest by the European Commission in 2013, and the binding list on 18 November 2015. On 24 November 2017, it was included for the third time. In mid-2017, Energinet and Gaz-System (each owning half of the project) launched the open season procedure. In January 2018, they signed 15-year capacity agreements with market participants. In 2018, public hearings took place in Denmark, Sweden, Germany and Poland. In July 2018, a €18.3 million subsidy was granted from the Connecting Europe Facility. In April 2019, €214.9 million funding was granted to the project by the European Commission.

In 2018, Denmark and Poland ended 40 years of maritime border dispute when they signed an agreement concerning 3,600 km^{2} (1,400 sq mi) of Baltic Sea between Bornholm and Poland, with Denmark receiving 80% of the area. This paved the way for Baltic Pipe.

Between 2018 and 2020, analytical, survey and design works were carried out in order to obtain the required permits for construction and operation of the Baltic offshore pipeline. Routes through Swedish and German waters were possible, and the Swedish route was chosen.

In 2018, 48% of electricity produced in Poland came from hard coal, 29% from brown coal, 13% from renewable sources (mostly wind power) and 7% from natural gas.

On 3 June 2021, the Danish Environmental and Food Appeals Board announced that it had repealed a land permit issued in 2019 for Baltic Pipe. According to the appeals board, a permit for the project given by the Danish Environmental Protection Agency did not sufficiently lay out the measures that would be taken to protect dormice, Nordic birch mice and bats during construction of the 210-kilometre (130-mile) pipeline across Denmark. The decision meant that Denmark's environmental agency needed to carry out more studies.

On 19 June 2021, the Danish Environmental Protection Agency informed that the Baltic Pipe Project can resume construction works in specific parts of the 210-kilometre (130 mi) route across Denmark. It is expected that the overall project will be delayed by 3 months, but that it will be able to deliver a large part of the agreed upon capacity by October 2022 working towards delivering full capacity by the end of 2022.

On 21 December 2021, the Danish Environmental Protection Agency began the 8 weeks long hearing period for the Baltic Pipe Environmental Impact Assessment Report and the draft hearing for the project.

On 1 March 2022, the Danish Environmental Protection Agency has issued a new environmental permit for the Baltic Pipe gas pipeline after the original permit was repealed by the Danish Environmental and Food Appeals Board in 2021. With the new permit, Energinet can restart construction on parts of the project in the eastern part of the Jutland peninsula and on the western part of the island of Funen.

In April 2022, the North Sea connection was made. Work still remained onshore.

Energinet commenced commissioning the Baltic Pipe on 27 September 2022, using parts of the existing gas transmission system in Denmark as temporary replacement for the parts that have been delayed. The entire project is expected to be operational at full annual capacity of up to 10 billion cubic metres per annum (350 billion cubic feet per annum) by 1 January 2023. By August, the pipeline had been welded, tested and cleaned between Denmark and Poland. On 15 September, PGNiG announced that no hydrocarbons were found in the Norwegian Copernicus oil and gas field, of which they own 50%. On 23 September, PGNiG and Equinor announced a 10-year gas supply contract through Baltic Pipe at 2.4 billion cubic metres per annum (85 billion cubic feet per annum), from 2023 to 2033. The opening of Baltic Sea section took place in Szczecin, Poland on 27 September 2022, and the North Sea section opened on 1 November 2022. Full capacity was ready on 30 November 2022.

== Technical features ==
The original 275-kilometre (171 mi) submarine pipeline was to connect Faxe South in Denmark and Niechorze-Pogorzelica in Poland. The cost of building that pipeline was estimated at €335-350 million, depending on the diameter of the pipe. It was planned to be built allowing gas flows in both directions.

The current project consists of five major segments:

- The North Sea offshore pipeline – An offshore pipeline between the Norwegian gas system in the North Sea and the Danish gas transmission system, branching off Europipe II that connects Norway and Germany. Its landfall is on the west coast of Denmark near Blaabjerg. The offshore pipeline was built and operated by Energinet.
- Onshore Denmark – Expansion of the existing Danish transmission system from west to east, including 200 kilometres (120 mi) of new pipelines. The expansions in Denmark included construction of a new pipeline from Blaabjerg to Nybro, construction of a receiving plant at Nybro, construction of a new pipeline from Egtved to the Little Belt, construction of a new pipeline across the Little Belt, construction of a new pipeline over Fyn from the Little Belt to Nyborg, and construction of a new pipeline on Zealand from Kongsmark to the Baltic Sea offshore landfall at the southeaster part of Zealand. It is built and operated by Energinet.
- A compressor station in Denmark located on the eastern part of Zealand, which is necessary for the pipeline between Denmark and Poland. It also ensures the reverse flow. It is built and operated by Energinet, and it is co-financed by Gaz-System.
- The Baltic Sea offshore pipeline of 275 kilometres (171 mi) between Denmark and Poland providing bi-directional transmission of gas. The route goes through the Danish and Polish maritime areas and Swedish exclusive economic zone with the preferred landfalls in Faxe South Denmark and in Niechorze–Pogorzelica in Poland. The offshore pipeline is built and operated by Gaz-System.
- Onshore Poland – expansion of the Polish gas transmission system, including 230 to 340 kilometres (140 to 210 mi) new pipeline and three gas compressor stations. It consists of construction of the onshore gas pipeline connecting the offshore gas pipeline to the national transmission system, construction of the Goleniów–Lwówek pipeline, extension of the Goleniów gas compressor station, construction of the Gustorzyn gas compressor station, and extension of the Odolanów gas compressor station. It is built and operated by Gaz-System.

At fully operational in December 2022, it has a gas transportation capacity of 10 billion cubic metres per annum (350 billion cubic feet per annum) from Norway to Denmark and Poland, and 3 billion cubic metres per annum (110 billion cubic feet per annum) from Poland to Denmark. The pipeline from the North Sea to Poland has a total length of 800–950 kilometres (500–590 mi).

The Baltic Pipe has the capacity to replace the roughly 60% of Polish gas imports coming from Russia via the Yamal pipeline.

== See also ==
- 2022 Russia–European Union gas dispute – Fossil fuel financing-related conflicts
- Nord Stream 1 and Nord Stream 2
- Energy in Poland
- Gas Interconnection Poland–Lithuania – Natural gas pipeline
- List of natural gas pipelines
- Świnoujście LNG terminal – LNG terminal in Poland
