= Baltic Gas Interconnector =

Location
- Country: Germany; Denmark; Sweden
- Start: Rostock
- Passes through: Baltic Sea
- To: Avedøre and Trelleborg

General information
- Type: natural gas
- Partners: DONG Energy; HNG; VNG - Verbundnetz Gas AG; E.ON Sverige; Göteborgs Energi; Lunds Energi; Öresundskraft
- Expected: cancelled

Technical information
- Length: 200 km (120 mi)
- Maximum discharge: 3 billion cubic metres (110×10^{9} cu ft)
- Diameter: 32 in (813 mm)

The Baltic Gas Interconnector was a 2001 project of a natural gas submarine pipeline in the Baltic Sea between Germany, Denmark and Sweden. The pipeline would connect the existing pipeline networks of southern Scandinavian and Continental European countries in order to secure uninterrupted supply of natural gas.

== Route ==
In Germany, landfall of the pipeline was to be in Rostock area in the north-eastern part of Germany. The German onshore section was to include a compressor station and a connection to the existing gas network. The length of planned offshore section was around 200 kilometres (120 mi). The Danish landing point was to be in Avedøre in the eastern part of Denmark, and the pipeline was planned to connect with the Avedøre power plant. In Sweden, the landing point was to be in Trelleborg on the southern tip of Sweden, and the Swedish onshore section was to continue approximately 20 kilometres (12 mi) to the existing gas grid.

== Technical features ==
The pipeline was designed for a pressure of 150 bars (15 MPa) with a diameter of 28 to 32 inches (710 to 810 mm). The planned annual capacity was 3 billion cubic metres (110 billion cubic feet) with option for later increase up to 10 billion cubic metres (350 billion cubic feet).

The consortium to build the Baltic Gas Interconnector consisted of DONG Energy (originally Energi E2), Hovedstadsregionens Naturgas (HNG), VNG - Verbundnetz Gas AG, E.ON Sverige AB, Göteborgs Energi, Lunds Energi and Öresundskraft.

== Feasibility study ==
The feasibility study which was completed in 2001 included market assessment, seabed survey, offshore and onshore installations estimated total cost to be €225 million ($202.3 million). The pipeline was scheduled to become operational circa 2004–2005. Environmental impact assessment started in 2002. Authorization from Swedish government was given in 2004, by Denmark – in 2005. The last phase of authorization was to come from Germany, in 2006. The project was not implemented.

During the initial stages of the project, gas was planned to be transported from the North Sea which is now in depletion. Consequently, Russian gas was considered as an alternative source for the pipeline, and implementation of BGI was revisited in 2007 and the Nord Stream 1 pipeline was considered to be connected to the Swedish pipeline network.
