= Gmina Brześć Kujawski =

Gmina Brześć Kujawski Brześć Kujawski Commune
- Gmina
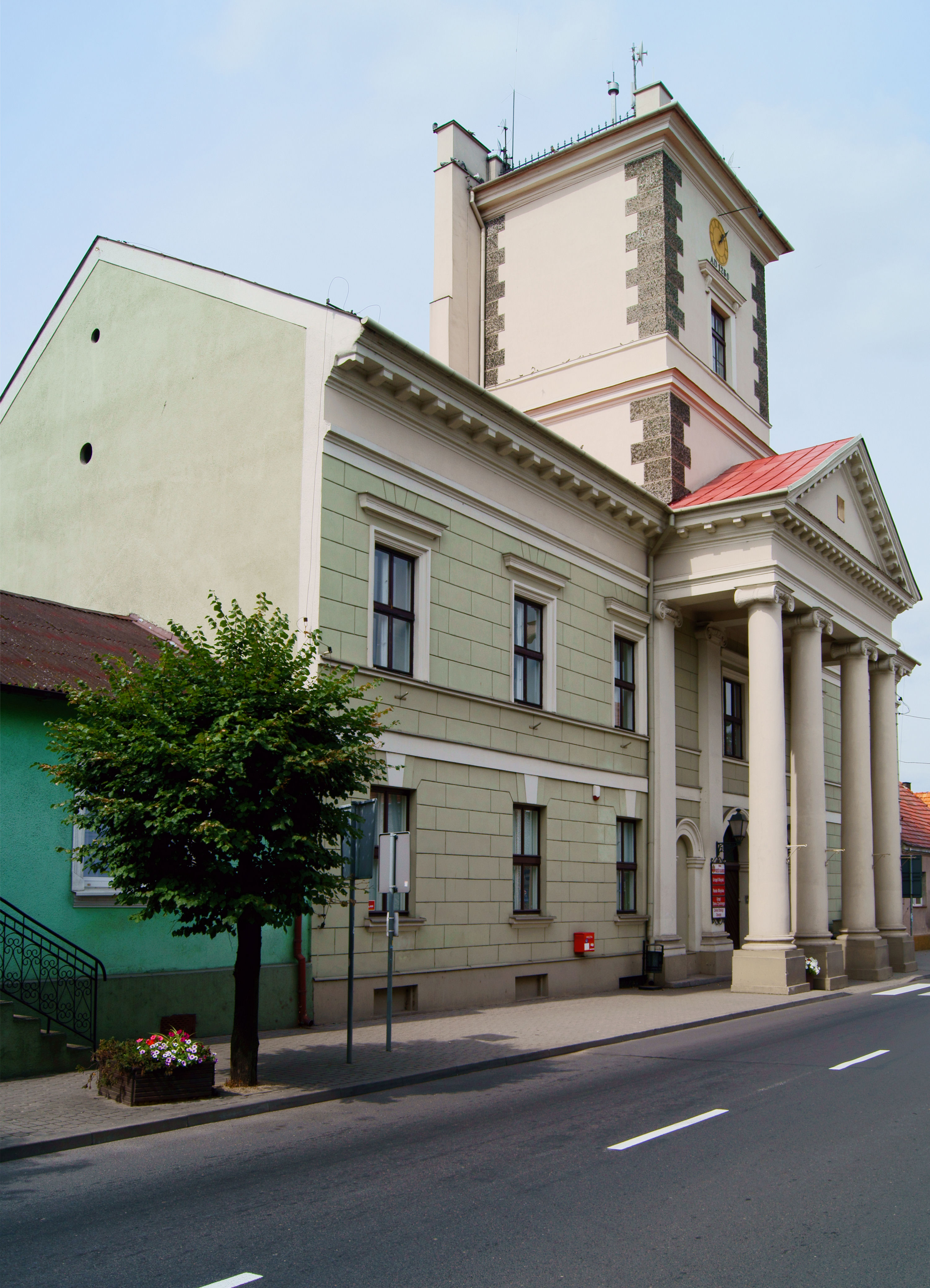
- Town Hall in Brześć Kujawski, seat of the gmina office

- Flag Coat of arms
- Interactive map of Gmina Brześć Kujawski
- Coordinates (Brześć Kujawski): 52°36′18″N 18°53′53″E
- Country: Poland
- Voivodeship: Kuyavian-Pomeranian
- County: Włocławek County
- Seat: Brześć Kujawski

Area
  - Total: 150.44 km^{2} (58.09 sq mi)

Population (2006)
  - Total: 11,066
  - Density: 73.558/km^{2} (190.51/sq mi)
  - Urban: 4,522
  - Rural: 6,544
- Time zone: UTC+1 (CET)
  - Summer (DST): UTC+2 (CEST)
- Vehicle registration: CWL
- Website: http://www.brzesckujawski.pl

Gmina Brześć Kujawski is an urban-rural gmina (administrative district) in Włocławek County, Kuyavian-Pomeranian Voivodeship, in central Poland. Its seat is the town of Brześć Kujawski, which lies approximately 12 kilometres (7 mi) south-west of Włocławek and 52 km (32 mi) south of Toruń.

The gmina covers an area of 150.44 square kilometres (58.1 sq mi), and as of 2006 its total population is 11,066, of which the population of Brześć Kujawski is 4,522, and the population of the rural part of the gmina is 6,544.

== Villages ==
Apart from the town of Brześć Kujawski, Gmina Brześć Kujawski contains the villages and settlements of Aleksandrowo, Brzezie, Falborek, Falborz, Falborz-Kolonia, Gustorzyn, Guźlin, Jądrowice, Jaranówek, Kąkowa Wola, Kąkowa Wola-Parcele, Kąty, Kuczyna, Machnacz, Miechowice, Miechowice Duże, Parcele Sokołowskie, Pikutkowo, Redecz Krukowy, Rzadka Wola, Rzadka Wola-Parcele, Słone, Sokołowo-Kolonia, Starobrzeska Kolonia, Stary Brześć, Wieniec, Wieniec-Zalesie, Wieniec-Zdrój, Witoldowo and Wolica.

== Neighbouring gminas ==
Gmina Brześć Kujawski is bordered by the city of Włocławek and by the gminas of Bądkowo, Lubanie, Lubraniec, Osięciny and Włocławek.
