= Słone, Kuyavian-Pomeranian Voivodeship =

Słone
- Village
- Location within Poland
- Coordinates: 52°38′N 18°56′E
- Country: Poland
- Voivodeship: Kuyavian-Pomeranian
- County: Włocławek
- Gmina: Brześć Kujawski

Słone [ˈswɔnɛ] is a village in the administrative district of Gmina Brześć Kujawski, within Włocławek County, Kuyavian-Pomeranian Voivodeship, in north-central Poland.
