= Gaz-System =

GAZ-SYSTEM S.A.
- Company type: public
- Industry: oil and gas industry
- Founded: 16 April 2004
- Founder: PGNiG
- Headquarters: Warsaw, Poland
- Services: natural gas transmission
- Revenue: 551,000,000 euro (2018)
- Net income: 120,000,000 euro (2018)
- Owner: Ministry of Industry, Poland
- Number of employees: 2,975 (2018)

OGP Gaz-System S.A. (Polish: Operator Gazociągów Przesyłowych GAZ-SYSTEM S.A.) is a designated natural gas transmission system operator in Poland.

The company was established on 16 April 2004 as a wholly owned subsidiary of PGNiG (Polish Petroleum and Gas Mining Co.) under the name PGNiG – Przesył Sp. z o.o. On 28 April 2005, all shares of the company were transferred to the State Treasury of Poland and the current name of the company was adopted on 8 June 2005.

Gaz-System owns and operates all gas transmission pipelines in Poland, the terminal LNG at Świnoujście and the Baltic Pipe pipeline between Poland and Denmark, it owns the underground gas storage facilities operated by Gas Storage Poland Sp. z o. o. (a company from the Gaz-System Capital Group) and it operates the Yamal–Europe pipeline owned by EuRoPol Gaz S.A.
