= Gustorzyn =

- Village
- Location within Poland
- Coordinates: 52°39′00″N 18°53′00″E
- Country: Poland
- Voivodeship: Kuyavian-Pomeranian
- County: Włocławek
- Gmina: Brześć Kujawski
- Time zone: UTC+1 (CET)
  - Summer (DST): UTC+2 (CEST)
- Vehicle registration: CWL

Gustorzyn [ɡusˈtɔʐɨn] is a village in the administrative district of Gmina Brześć Kujawski, within Włocławek County, Kuyavian-Pomeranian Voivodeship, in north-central Poland. It is located in the historic region of Kuyavia.

== Transport ==
The Polish A1 motorway runs nearby, east of the village.
