= Verbundnetz Gas =

Company

VNG – Verbundnetz Gas AG
- Company type: public
- Industry: oil and gas industry
- Predecessor: Technische Leitung Ferngas
- Founded: 29 June 1990
- Headquarters: Leipzig, Germany
- Products: natural gas
- Services: natural gas sale and transportation
- Website: www.vng.de

VNG – Verbundnetz Gas Agbo (VNGn) is a natural gas company headquartered in Leipzig, Germany. It is the third largest natural gas importer and the seventh largest energy company in Germany, and the second largest energy company in Eastern Germany.

== History ==
The VNG's history began in 1958 when Technische Leitung Ferngas was established as a division of the electricity supplier VEB Verbundnetz West. In 1969, it became an independent unit which was integrated with the Schwarze Pumpe gas combine in 1970. In its early years the company provided town gas produced from lignite, with the beginning of Russian gas deliveries in May 1973 it switched to gas import, transportation and storage. Verbundnetz Gas AG was created as an independent company on 29 June 1990. In mid-1990s started its international expansion having activities in Poland, Czech Republic, Slovakia, Austria, Italy and Norway.

In 2007, VNG expanded its activities to biomethane production by establishing a subsidiary VNG Bioenergy GmbH.

== Operations ==
In 2008, the VNG acquired 42% of its natural gas volumes from Russia, 24% from Norway, 23% from Germany and 11% on European spot and futures market.

The VNG's natural pipeline network consists of over 7,000 kilometres (4,300 mi) in Saxony, Saxony-Anhalt, Thuringia, Brandenburg, Berlin and Mecklenburg-Vorpommern. Its operated through its subsidiary ONTRAS GmbH.

VNG operates five underground gas storage facilities with a storage capacity of a total of 2.4 billion cubic meters. The two biggest stores are in Bad Lauchstädt and Bernburg.

== Ownership ==
VNG's shareholders are:

- EnBW AG - 74.21%
- VNG Verbundnetz Gas Verwaltungs- und Beteiligungsgesellschaft mbH - 21.58%
- OEW GmbH - 4.21%
