= Bolsøy =

Bolsøy may refer to:

== Places ==
- Bolsøya (older spelling: Bolsøy), an island in Molde Municipality in Møre og Romsdal county, Norway
- Bolsøy Municipality, a former municipality in Møre og Romsdal county, Norway
- Bolsøy Church, an older name for a church in Molde Municipality in Møre og Romsdal county, Norway
- Bolsøya, Nordland (older spelling: Bolsøy), an island in Hamarøy Municipality in Nordland county, Norway
