= Bolsøy Municipality =

Former municipality in Møre og Romsdal, Norway

Bolsøy Municipality Bolsøy herred
- Former municipality
- Bolsø herred (historic name)
- Møre og Romsdal within Norway

- Bolsøy within Møre og Romsdal
- Coordinates: 62°46′49″N 07°29′33″E
- Country: Norway
- County: Møre og Romsdal
- District: Romsdal
- Established: 1 Jan 1838
  - Created as: Formannskapsdistrikt
- Disestablished: 1 Jan 1964
  - Succeeded by: Molde Municipality
- Administrative centre: Bolsøya

Government
  - Mayor (1960–1963): Leif J. Lunder

Area (upon dissolution)
  - Total: 270.7 km^{2} (104.5 sq mi)
  - Rank: #304 in Norway
- Highest elevation: 1,127.7 m (3,700 ft)

Population (1963)
  - Total: 7,888
  - Rank: #97 in Norway
  - Density: 29.1/km^{2} (75/sq mi)
  - Change (10 years): ▲ +30.9%
- Demonym: Bolsøy-folk

Official language
  - Norwegian form: Neutral
- Time zone: UTC+01:00 (CET)
  - Summer (DST): UTC+02:00 (CEST)
- ISO 3166 code: NO-1544

Bolsøy is a former municipality in Møre og Romsdal county, Norway. The 271-square-kilometre (105 sq mi) municipality existed from 1838 until its dissolution in 1964. The area is now part of Molde Municipality in the traditional district of Romsdal. The administrative centre was Bolsøy on the island of Bolsøya where the Bolsøy Church is located.

Prior to its dissolution in 1964, the 270.7-square-kilometre (104.5 sq mi) municipality was the 304th largest by area out of the 689 municipalities in Norway. Bolsøy Municipality was the 97th most populous municipality in Norway with a population of about 7,888. The municipality's population density was 29.1 inhabitants per square kilometre (75/sq mi) and its population had increased by 30.9% over the previous 10-year period.

== General information ==
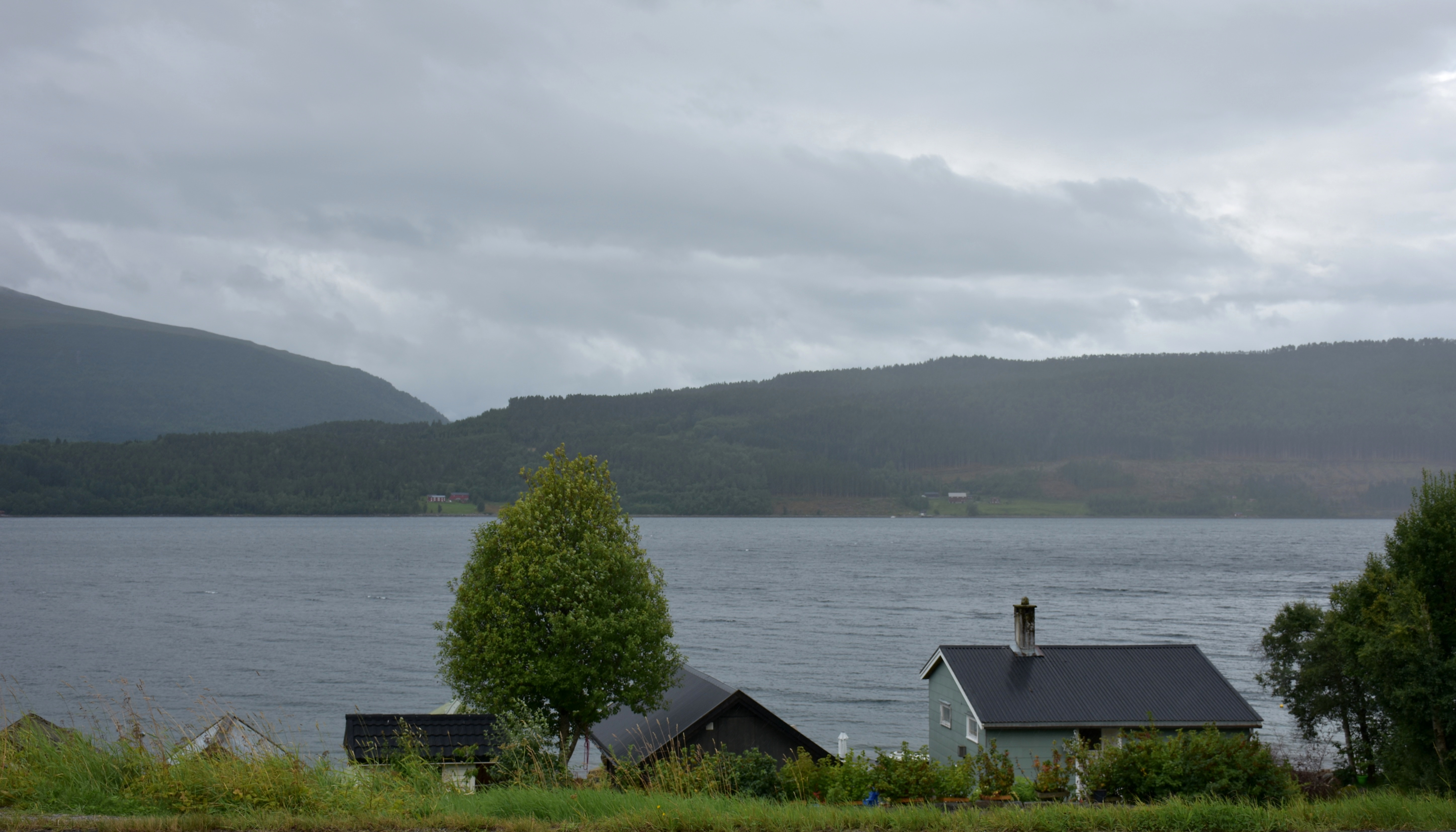
Bolsøy included the areas surrounding the Fannefjorden

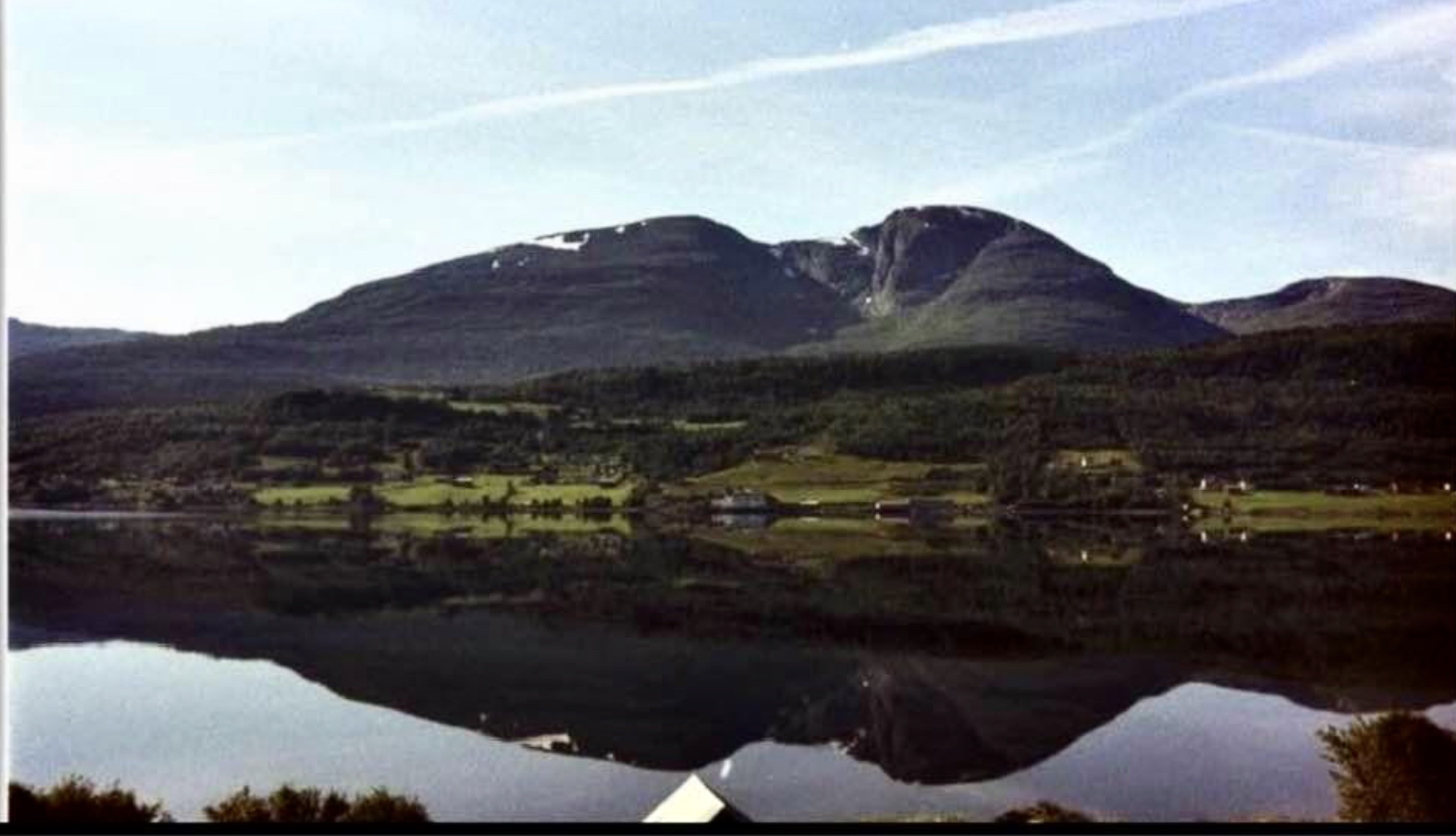
View of Kortgarden, a small village in Bolsøy

The parish of Bolsøy was established as a municipality on 1 January 1838 (see formannskapsdistrikt law). According to the 1835 census, Bolsøy had a population of 2,391. On 1 January 1877, the Sotnakken farm (population: 19) was transferred to Bolsøy Municipality from Nesset Municipality. In 1915, a part of Bolsøy Municipality with 183 inhabitants was transferred to the growing town of Molde. Again in 1952, another part of Bolsøy Municipality (population: 1,913) was transferred to the town of Molde.

During the 1960s, there were many municipal mergers across Norway due to the work of the Schei Committee. On 1 January 1964, the following areas were merged to form a new, larger Molde Municipality:

- all of Bolsøy Municipality (population: 7,996)
- the town of Molde (population: 8,239)
- the northern part of Veøy Municipality (population: 756)
- the Mordal area of Nord-Aukra Municipality (population: 77)

=== Name ===
The municipality (originally the parish) is named after the island of Bolsøya (Old Norse: Bylingsøy) since the first Bolsøy Church was built there. The first element comes from the old name for the island. The island's name is uncertain, but it may come from the word boli which means "bull". The last element is øy which means "island". Historically, the name of the municipality was spelled Bolsø. On 3 November 1917, a royal resolution changed the spelling of the name of the municipality to Bolsøy.

=== Churches ===
The Church of Norway had three parishes (sokn) within Bolsøy Municipality. At the time of the municipal dissolution, it was part of the Bolsøy prestegjeld and the Ytre Romsdal prosti (deanery) in the Diocese of Nidaros.

Churches in Bolsøy Municipality
Parish (sokn)	Church name	Location of the church	Year built
Bolsøy	Bolsøy Church	Røbekk	1896
Kleive	Kleive Church	Kleive	1858
Røvik	Røvik Church	Røvika	1905

== Geography ==
The municipality was centered around the Moldefjorden and Fannefjorden, surrounding the town of Molde. Fræna Municipality and Øre Municipality were to the north, Nesset Municipality was to the southeast, Veøy Municipality was to the south, and Nord-Aukra Municipality was to the west. The highest point in the municipality was the 1,127.7-metre (3,700 ft) tall mountain Skåla, located about 10 kilometres (6.2 mi) to the northeast of the village of Nesjestranda.

== Government ==
While it existed, Bolsøy Municipality was responsible for primary education (through 10th grade), outpatient health services, senior citizen services, welfare and other social services, zoning, economic development, and municipal roads and utilities. The municipality was governed by a municipal council of directly elected representatives. The mayor was indirectly elected by a vote of the municipal council. The municipality was under the jurisdiction of the Frostating Court of Appeal.

=== Municipal council ===
The municipal council (Herredsstyre) of Bolsøy Municipality was made up of 35 representatives that were elected to four year terms. The tables below show the historical composition of the council by political party.

Bolsøy herredsstyre 1959–1963
Party name (in Norwegian)	Number of representatives
Labour Party (Arbeiderpartiet)	15
Conservative Party (Høyre)	3
Christian Democratic Party (Kristelig Folkeparti)	8
Centre Party (Senterpartiet)	4
Liberal Party (Venstre)	5
Total number of members:	35
Note: On 1 January 1964, Bolsøy Municipality became part of Molde Municipality.

Bolsøy herredsstyre 1955–1959
Party name (in Norwegian)	Number of representatives
Labour Party (Arbeiderpartiet)	15
Conservative Party (Høyre)	2
Christian Democratic Party (Kristelig Folkeparti)	8
Farmers' Party (Bondepartiet)	5
Liberal Party (Venstre)	5
Total number of members:	35

Bolsøy herredsstyre 1951–1955
Party name (in Norwegian)	Number of representatives
Labour Party (Arbeiderpartiet)	13
Conservative Party (Høyre)	1
Christian Democratic Party (Kristelig Folkeparti)	8
Farmers' Party (Bondepartiet)	4
Liberal Party (Venstre)	5
Local List(s) (Lokale lister)	1
Total number of members:	32

Bolsøy herredsstyre 1947–1951
Party name (in Norwegian)	Number of representatives
Labour Party (Arbeiderpartiet)	10
Conservative Party (Høyre)	1
Communist Party (Kommunistiske Parti)	2
Christian Democratic Party (Kristelig Folkeparti)	0
Farmers' Party (Bondepartiet)	1
Liberal Party (Venstre)	3
Joint List(s) of Non-Socialist Parties (Borgerlige Felleslister)	6
Total number of members:	32

Bolsøy herredsstyre 1945–1947
Party name (in Norwegian)	Number of representatives
Labour Party (Arbeiderpartiet)	13
Conservative Party (Høyre)	1
Communist Party (Kommunistiske Parti)	2
Christian Democratic Party (Kristelig Folkeparti)	8
Liberal Party (Venstre)	3
Joint List(s) of Non-Socialist Parties (Borgerlige Felleslister)	4
Local List(s) (Lokale lister)	1
Total number of members:	32

Bolsøy herredsstyre 1937–1941*
Party name (in Norwegian)	Number of representatives
Labour Party (Arbeiderpartiet)	13
Conservative Party (Høyre)	1
Farmers' Party (Bondepartiet)	2
Liberal Party (Venstre)	6
Joint list of the Farmers' Party (Bondepartiet) and the Liberal Party (Venstre)	5
Joint List(s) of Non-Socialist Parties (Borgerlige Felleslister)	2
Total number of members:	32
Note: Due to the German occupation of Norway during World War II, no elections were held for new municipal councils until after the war ended in 1945.

=== Mayors ===
The mayor (Norwegian: ordfører) of Bolsøy Municipality was the political leader of the municipality and the chairperson of the municipal council. The following people have held this position:

- 1838–1840: Hans Jørgen Synnestvedt
- 1841–1843: Løve Sørensen Schevik
- 1844–1845: Lars Knudsen Hungnæs
- 1846–1849: Ebbe Carsten Tønder Astrup
- 1850–1851: Løve Sørensen Schevik
- 1852–1853: Ole Olsen Aarøe
- 1854–1857: Wollert Danckertsen Krohn
- 1858–1860: Petter Anton Møller
- 1860–1860: Ole Olsen Aarøe
- 1861–1875: Thomas Talseth
- 1876–1879: Lars Hungnes
- 1880–1885: Thomas Talseth
- 1886–1907: Lars Hungnes
- 1908–1919: Ole Thorvik
- 1920–1922: Christian Johannessen
- 1923–1928: Knut Kringstad
- 1929–1931: Aslak Hagen
- 1932–1936: Mathias A. Lervik
- 1937–1939: Knut Valved
- 1939–1941: Knut Kringstad
- 1946–1947: Ansgar Berild
- 1948–1951: Gunnar Solli
- 1952–1955: Ansgar Berild
- 1956–1957: Rolf Møller
- 1958–1959: Ingolf L. Pedersen
- 1960–1963: Leif J. Lunder

== See also ==
- List of former municipalities of Norway
