= Molde =

Town in Møre og Romsdal, Norway

- Town
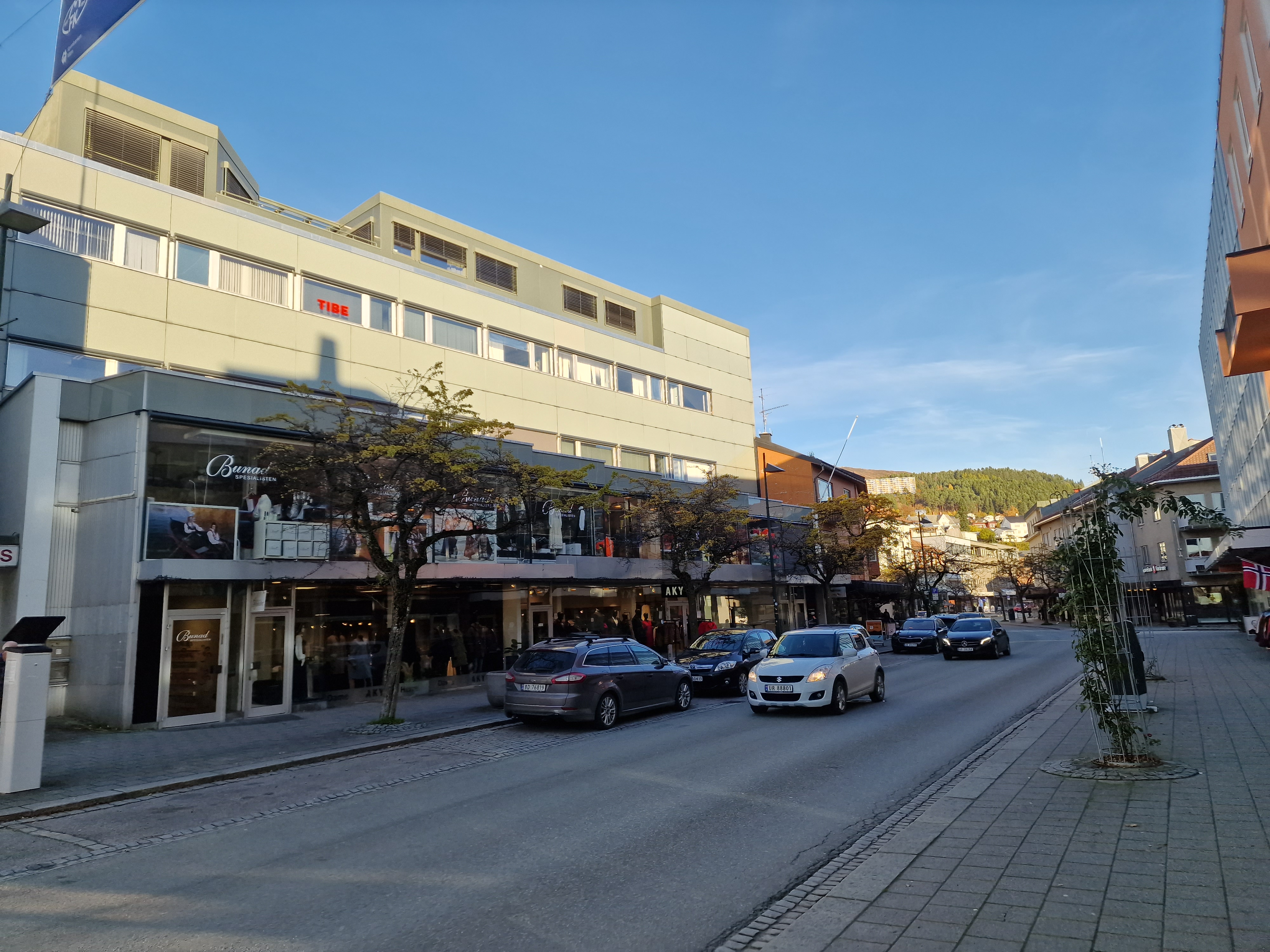
- Downtown Molde
- Nickname: Rosenes by (Town of Roses)
- Interactive map of Molde
- Location within Møre og Romsdal Location within Norway
- Coordinates: 62.7375°N 7.1591°E
- Country: Norway
- Region: Western Norway
- County: Møre og Romsdal
- District: Romsdal
- Municipality: Molde Municipality
- Established as
- Ladested: 1614
- Kjøpstad: 1742

Area
  - Total: 9.48 km^{2} (3.66 sq mi)
- Elevation: 4 m (13 ft)

Population (2024)
  - Total: 22,410
  - Density: 2,364/km^{2} (6,120/sq mi)
- Demonyms: Moldenser; Moldensar
- Time zone: UTC+01:00 (CET)
  - Summer (DST): UTC+02:00 (CEST)
- Post Code: 6400 Molde

Molde (Norwegian pronunciation: [ˈmɔ̂ɫdə]) is a town, an Urban Area, and the seat of Molde Municipality in Møre og Romsdal county, Norway. It is located in the traditional district of Romsdal. It is located on the Romsdal Peninsula, surrounding the Fannefjord and Moldefjord.

Molde has a maritime, temperate climate, with cool-to-warm summers, and relatively mild winters. It is nicknamed The Town of Roses.

The settlement emerged as a shipping port for lumber to the Netherlands in the late 1500s. Formal trading rights were granted at some point before 1604, and the town was incorporated through a royal charter in 1742. Bolsøy Municipality, which later merged with Molde town, was established on 1 January 1838 (see formannskapsdistrikt law).

The town continued to grow throughout the 17th to 19th centuries, becoming a centre for the Norwegian textile and garment industry, as well as the administrative centre for the region, and was a major tourist destination until World War I. After World War II, Molde experienced accelerated growth, merging with Bolsøy Municipality and parts of Veøy Municipality and Nord-Aukra Municipality on 1 January 1964, making the municipality much larger than the urban area of the town of Molde. On 1 January 2020, the municipality was expanded again through the incorporation of the neighboring Midsund Municipality and Nesset Municipality, making the area of the municipality quite large in comparison to the town.

The town has a population of 22,410 (2024) and a population density of 2,364 inhabitants per square kilometre (6,120/sq mi).

== History ==
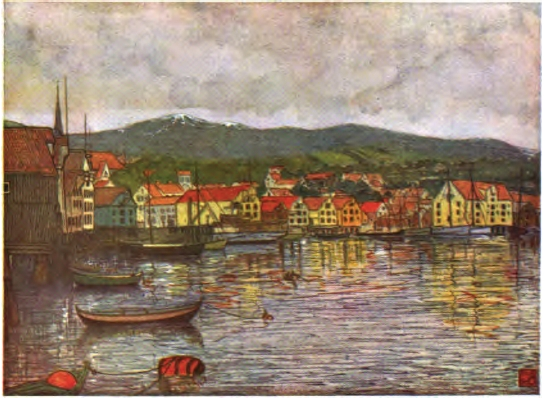
Illustration of Molde, painting by Nico Wilhelm Jungmann, 1904

The city's current location dates from the late Medieval times but is preceded by an earlier Medieval township on Veøya, an island to the south of present-day Molde. The settlement at Veøya probably dates from the Migration Period, but is first mentioned in the sagas by Snorri Sturluson as the location of the Battle of Sekken in 1162, where king Håkon the Broad-shouldered was killed fighting the aristocrat Erling Skakke, during the Norwegian civil wars. However, settlement in the area can be traced much further back in time—evidence given by two rock slabs carved with petroglyphs found at Bjørset, west of the city center.

At the eve of the 15th century, the influence of Veøya waned, and the island was eventually deserted.

Originating from the two farms Reknes and Molde (later Moldegård), a minor port called Moldefjæra (Molde Landing) emerged around 1600, based on trade with timber and herring.

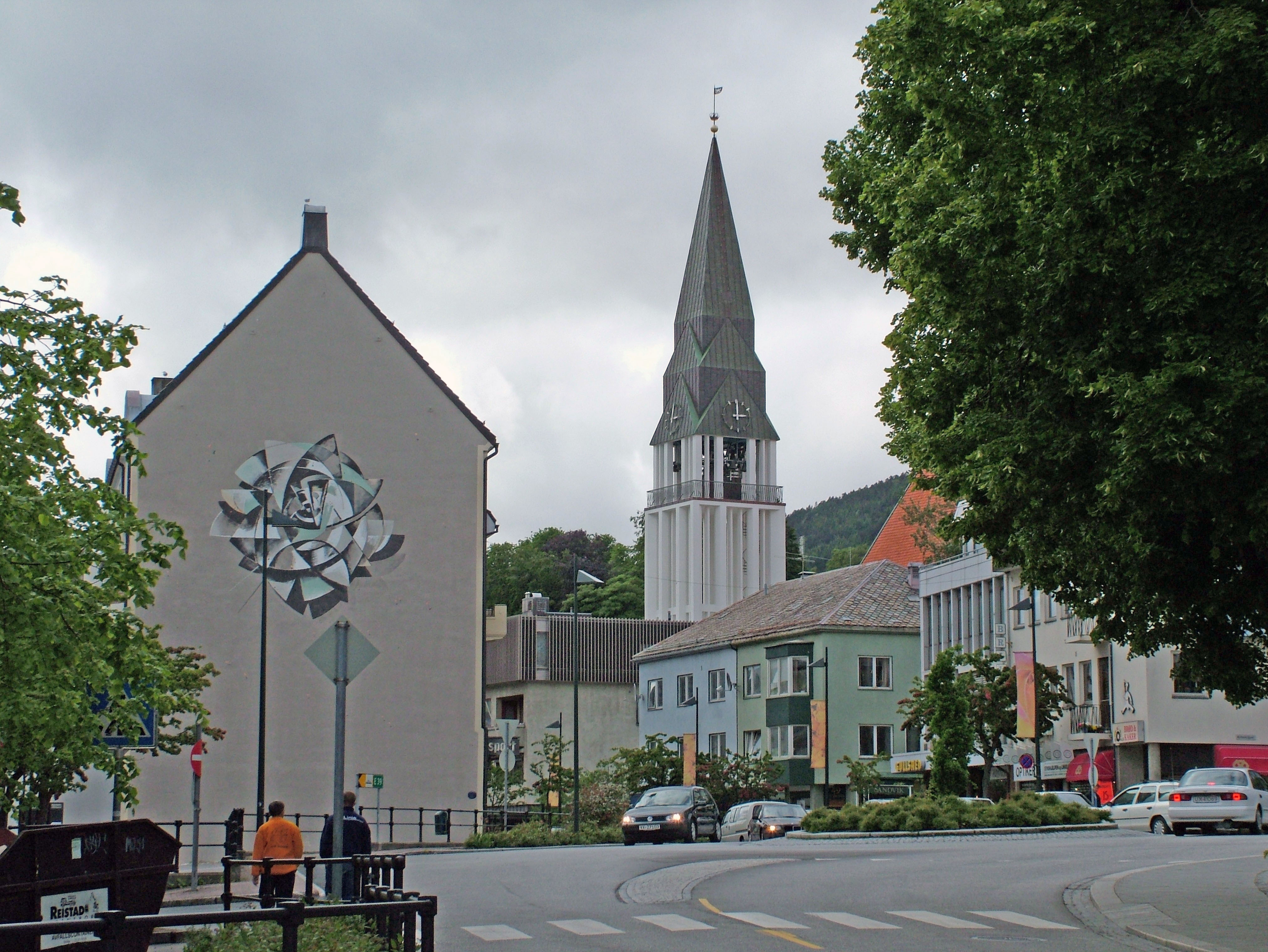
Molde's main street and commercial center. Molde Cathedral (orange roof on the far right) with its freestanding bell tower replaced the church that was destroyed during World War II

The town gained formal trading rights before 1604 under the supervision of Trondheim. After the Treaty of Copenhagen in 1660, Molde became the administrative center of Romsdal amt, and was incorporated as a city through a royal charter in 1742. Molde continued to grow throughout the 18th and 19th centuries, becoming a center for the Norwegian textile and garment industry. Tourism later became a major industry, and Molde saw notabilities such as the German emperor Wilhelm II of Germany and the Prince of Wales as regular summer visitors. Molde consisted of luxurious hotels surrounding an idyllic township with quaint, wooden houses, lush gardens, and parks, esplanades, and pavilions, earning it the nickname the Town of Roses. This was interrupted when one-third of the city was destroyed in a fire on 21 January 1916. However, Molde recovered and continued to grow in the economically difficult interbellum period.

A second fire, or series of fires, struck from the German air-raids in April and May 1940, which destroyed about two-thirds of the town. Molde was in effect the capital of Norway for a week after King Haakon, Crown Prince Olav, and members of the government and parliament arrived at Molde on April 23, after a dramatic flight from Oslo. They were put up at Glomstua, then at the western outskirts of the town, and experienced the bombing raids personally. The Norwegian gold reserve was also conveyed to Molde, and was hidden in a clothing factory.

However, German intelligence was well aware of this, and on April 25 the Luftwaffe initiated a series of air-raids. For a week the air-raid siren on the chimney of the dairy building announced the repeated attacks. April 29 turned out to be the worst day in the history of Molde, as the city was transformed into a sea of flames by incendiary bombs. Until then the church had escaped undamaged, but in the final sortie a firebomb became stuck high up in the tower, and the wooden church was obliterated by fire.

After World War II, Molde experienced tremendous growth. As the modernization of the Norwegian society accelerated in the post-reconstruction years, Molde became a center for not only administrative and public services, but also academic resources and industrial output. After the consolidation of the town itself and its adjacent communities in 1964, Molde became a modern city, encompassing most branches of employment, from farming and fisheries to industrial production, banking, higher education, tourism, commerce, health care, and civil administration.

=== Municipality ===
The town of Molde was established as an urban municipality on 1 January 1838 (see formannskapsdistrikt law). It was surrounded by the rural Bolsøy Municipality. On 1 July 1915, a part of Bolsøy Municipality (population: 183) was transferred into the city of Molde. On 1 January 1952, another part of Bolsøy Municipality (population: 1,913) was transferred into the city of Molde.

During the 1960s, there were many municipal mergers across Norway due to the work of the Schei Committee. On 1 January 1964, the Molde (town) (population: 8,289) merged with the Sekken, Veøya, and Nesjestranda parts of Veøy Municipality (population: 756), all of Bolsøy Municipality (population: 7,996), and the Mordal area of Nord-Aukra Municipality (population: 77) to form a new, larger Molde Municipality.

On 1 January 2020, the neighbouring Midsund Municipality and Nesset Municipality merged with Molde to form a much larger Molde Municipality.

== Name ==
The municipality (originally the town and parish) is named after the old Molde farmstead (Old Norse: Moldar) since this was where the town was built. The name's origin is somewhat uncertain. It could be the plural form is mold which means "fertile soil" or "earth". The other possibility is that it comes from the word moldr which means "skull" or "mold" (referring to the rounded peaks in Moldemarka). Pronunciation varies between the standard Molde and the rural Molle (pronounced with thick "l"). A person from Molde will refer to themself as a Moldenser.

== Geography ==
Molde Municipality includes part of the Romsdal peninsula as well as many islands including the islands of Otrøya and Midøya. To the southeast, Molde Municipality stretches about 75 kilometres (47 mi) inland. The town of Molde consists of a 10 kilometres (6.2 mi) long and 1 to 2 kilometres (0.62 to 1.24 mi) wide strip of urban land running east–west along the north shore of the Moldefjord, an arm of the Romsdalsfjord, on the Romsdal peninsula. The city is sheltered by Bolsøya and the Molde archipelago, a chain of low-lying islands and islets, to the south, and the wood-clad hills of Moldemarka to the north. The city centre is located just west of the river Moldeelva, which runs into the city from the north, originating in the Moldevatnet lake, through the valley Moldedalen. Despite the river being minor and seasonal, it supported several sawmills in the 16th and 17th centuries. This gave rise to the original town itself through a combination of a good harbour, proximity to the sea routes, vast timber resources, and a river capable of supporting mills. In 1909, the river housed the first hydro electric power plant capable of providing sufficient electricity for the city, and the upper reaches of the river still provide drinking water for most of the city.

The highest point in the municipality is the 1,964.92-metre (6,446.6 ft) tall mountain Kleneggen. Its panoramic view of some 222 partly snow-clad peaks, usually referred to as the Molde panorama, is one of Molde's main attractions, and has drawn tourists to the city since the 19th century. Molde is nicknamed the Town of Roses, a name which originated during Molde's era as a tourist destination of international fame in the late 19th century.

Neighbouring municipalities are Aukra, Gjemnes, and Hustadvika (to the north); Ålesund (to the southwest); Vestnes and Rauma (to the south); and Tingvoll and Sunndal (to the east).

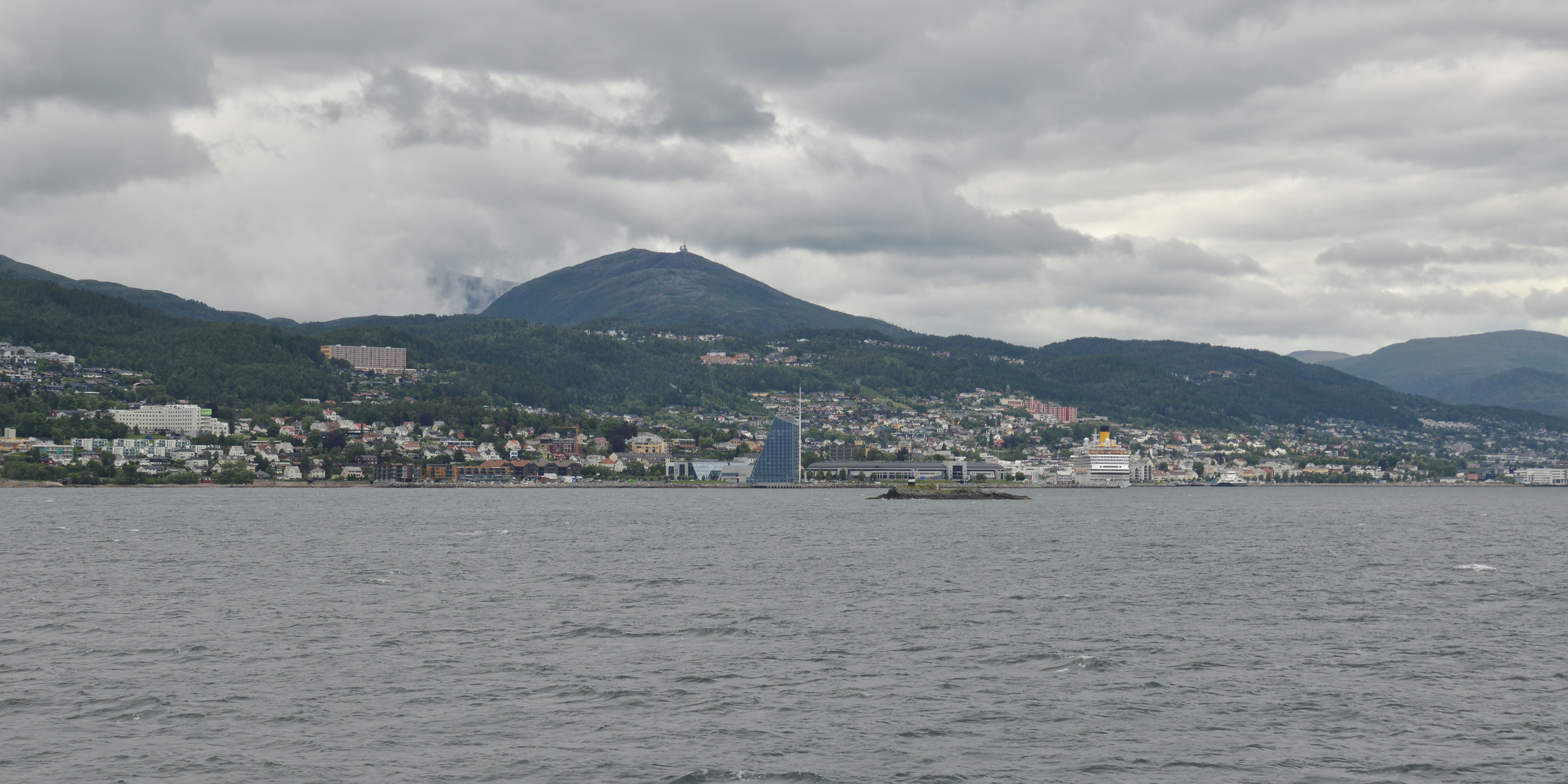
Panoramic view of Molde

=== Points of interest ===
Some points of interest in and near Molde Municipality:

- Salmon, sea trout and sea char are found in the rivers throughout the area, especially the Rauma, Driva, and Eira, already legendary among the British gentry in the mid-19th century. Trout is abundant in most lakes. Cod, pollock, saithe, mackerel and other species of saltwater fish are commonly caught in the Romsdalsfjord, both from land and from boat. Skiing is a common activity among the inhabitants of Molde in the winter, on groomed tracks, in resorts or by own trail. There are several rock climbing, ice climbing, bouldering, glacier and basejumping areas in the immediate vicinity of Molde.
- The Atlantic road was voted the Norwegian Construction of the Century in 2005. It is built on bridges and landfills across small islands and skerries, and spans from the small communities of Vikan and Vevang to Averøya, an island with several historic landmarks, such as the Bremsnes cave with Mesolithic findings from the Fosna culture, the mediaeval Kvernes stave church, and Langøysund, now a remote fishing community, but once a bustling port along the main coastal route. Langøysund was the site of the compromise between King Magnus I and the farmers along the coast in 1040. The compromise is regarded as Norway's Magna Carta, and is commemorated though the Pilespisser (English: Arrowheads) monument.
- Trollkirka (lit. 'Troll Church') is a marble grotto leading up to an underground waterfall. The grotto is situated 30 minutes outside Molde, followed by a 1-hour hike up a steep trail. Trollveggen is Europe's tallest vertical, overhanging mountain face, with several very difficult climbing routes. Trollstigen is the most visited tourist road in Norway. The road twists and turns its way up an almost vertical mountainside through 11 hairpin bends to an altitude of 858 m (2,814.96 ft). Mardalsfossen is the highest waterfall in Northern Europe and the fourth highest waterfall in the world, cascading 297 metres down into the valley. The total height of the waterfall is 655 m (2,148.95 ft).
- Bud is a fishing village on the very tip of the Romsdal peninsula. It gained importance during the Middle Ages as a trading post, and hosted the last free Privy Council of Norway in 1533, a desperate attempt to save the country's independence and stave off the Protestant Reformation, led by Olav Engelbrektsson, archbishop of Nidaros (today Trondheim). The massive Ergan coastal defences, a restored German coastal fort from World War II, and a part of the Atlantic Wall, is situated in Bud. The fishing communities of Ona, Bjørnsund and Håholmen are located on remote islands off the coast, only accessible by boat or ferry.

=== Moldemarka ===
View from the top of Varden

Moldemarka, the hilly woodland area north of the city, is public land. The area has an extensive network of paths, walking trails and skiing tracks. Forest roads enter the area from several directions. Bulletin boards and maps provide information regarding local plants and wildlife, as well as signposts along the trails. Marked trails lead to a number of peaks, sites and fishing lakes and rivers. A national fishing licence is required to fish in the lakes and streams.

Varden, 407 metres (1,335 ft) above sea level is a viewpoint directly above Molde, with a good view of the city, the fjord with the Molde archipelago and the Molde panorama.

=== Climate ===
Molde has a temperate oceanic climate (Cfb) also known as marine west coast climate. Molde holds the national high for the month of October, with 25.6 °C or 78.1 °F recorded on 11 October 2005. Due to its geographic location, Molde experiences frequent snowfalls in winter, but this snow is usually wet as the winters tend to be mild. The record high 32.2 °C or 90.0 °F was recorded 13 July 2025. The record low −17 °C or 1 °F was recorded in both January and February 2010.

A natural phenomenon occurring in Molde and the adjacent district, are frequent winter days with temperatures above 10 °C (50 °F), sometimes even above 14 °C (57 °F). This is due to the foehn wind from south and south-east. The sheltered location of the city, facing south with hills to the north, mountains to the east and mountainous islands to the west, contributes to Molde's climate and rich plant life, especially among species naturally growing on far lower latitudes, like chestnut, oak, tilia (lime or linden), beech, yew, and others.

Climate data for Molde Airport 1991–2020 (3 m, precipitation from Nøisomhed, extremes 2003–2025)
Month	Jan	Feb	Mar	Apr	May	Jun	Jul	Aug	Sep	Oct	Nov	Dec	Year
Record high °C (°F)	14.5 (58.1)	14.8 (58.6)	15.9 (60.6)	22.8 (73.0)	29.7 (85.5)	30.4 (86.7)	32.2 (90.0)	28.8 (83.8)	24.3 (75.7)	25.6 (78.1)	18.7 (65.7)	14.4 (57.9)	32.2 (90.0)
Mean daily maximum °C (°F)	3 (37)	4 (39)	6 (43)	10 (50)	14 (57)	17 (63)	19 (66)	19 (66)	15 (59)	11 (52)	6 (43)	4 (39)	11 (51)
Daily mean °C (°F)	1.1 (34.0)	0.9 (33.6)	2.4 (36.3)	5.7 (42.3)	9.2 (48.6)	12.5 (54.5)	15.4 (59.7)	14.7 (58.5)	11.4 (52.5)	6.7 (44.1)	3.9 (39.0)	1.3 (34.3)	7.1 (44.8)
Mean daily minimum °C (°F)	−1 (30)	0 (32)	0 (32)	2 (36)	6 (43)	10 (50)	12 (54)	12 (54)	9 (48)	5 (41)	2 (36)	1 (34)	5 (41)
Record low °C (°F)	−17 (1)	−17 (1)	−12.8 (9.0)	−6.7 (19.9)	−3 (27)	0.9 (33.6)	4.4 (39.9)	2.7 (36.9)	0.5 (32.9)	−6.4 (20.5)	−11.6 (11.1)	−14.2 (6.4)	−17 (1)
Average precipitation mm (inches)	181 (7.1)	164 (6.5)	118 (4.6)	98 (3.9)	95 (3.7)	89 (3.5)	99 (3.9)	132 (5.2)	185 (7.3)	189 (7.4)	144 (5.7)	173 (6.8)	1,667 (65.6)
Source 1: Norwegian Meteorological Institute
Source 2: Weatheronline Molde climate robot

== Government ==
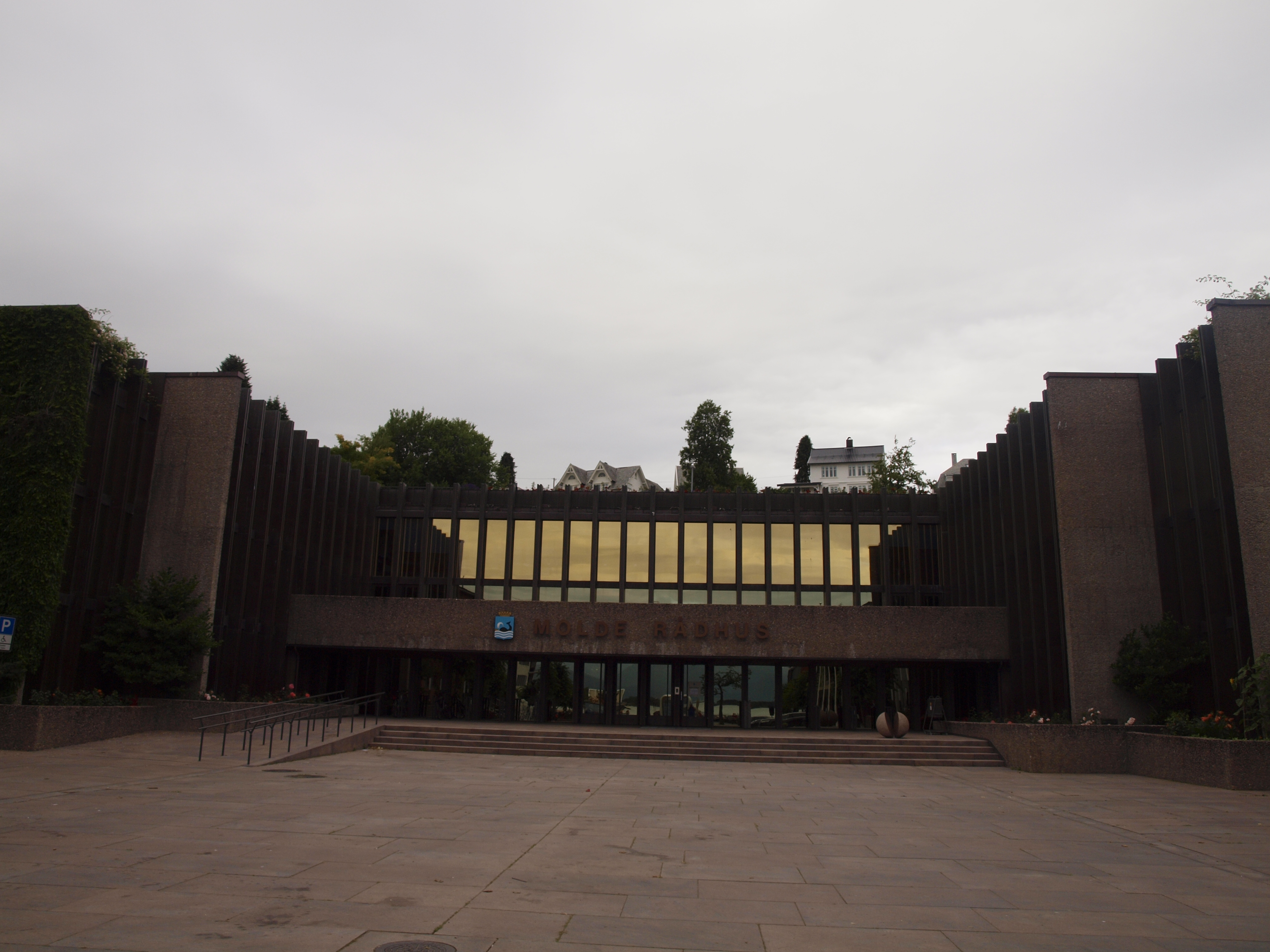
Molde town hall in 2018

Molde Municipality is responsible for primary education (through 10th grade), outpatient health services, senior citizen services, welfare and other social services, zoning, economic development, and municipal roads and utilities. The municipality is governed by a municipal council of directly elected representatives. The mayor is indirectly elected by a vote of the municipal council. The municipality is under the jurisdiction of the Møre og Romsdal District Court and the Frostating Court of Appeal.

== Culture ==
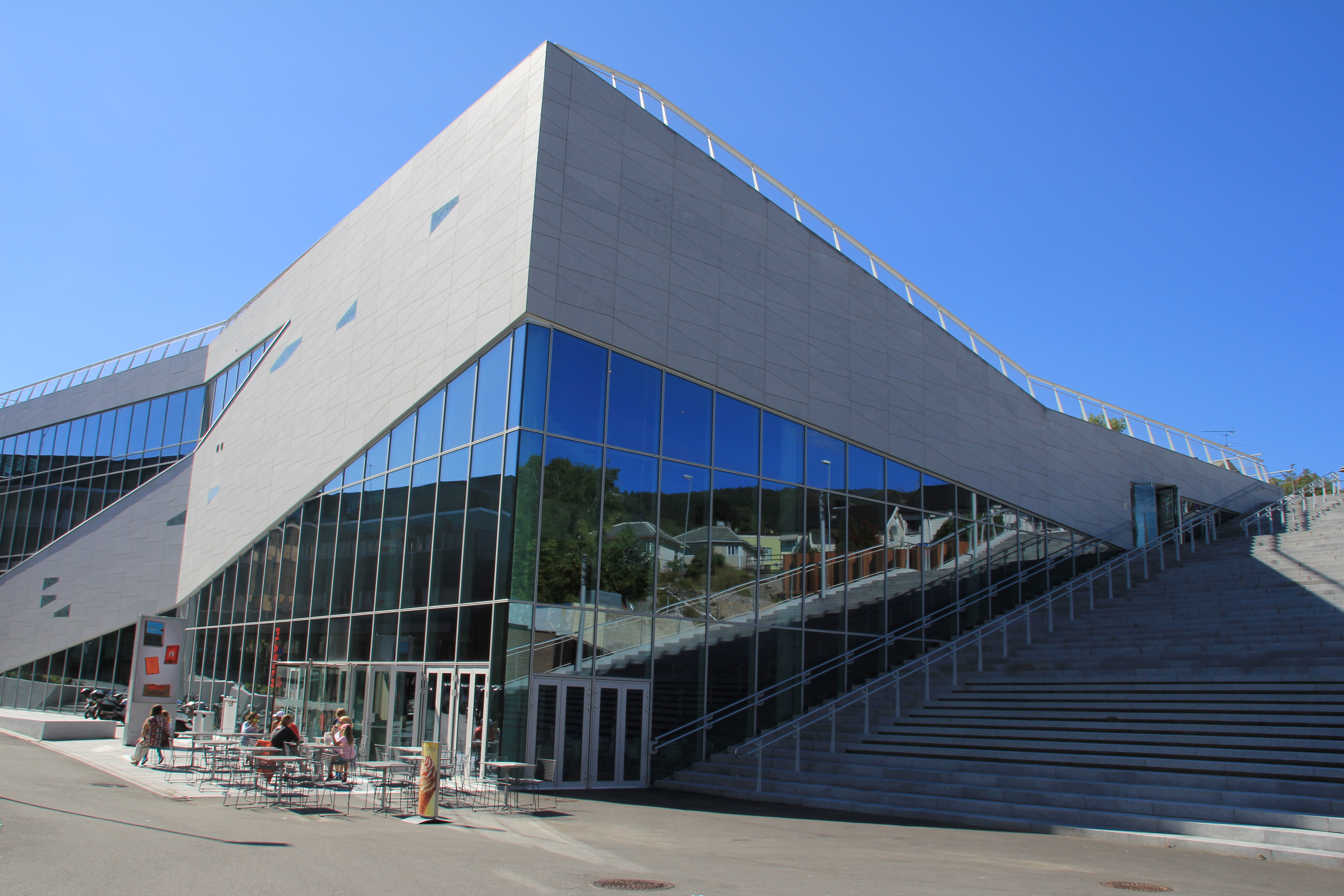
Cultural building, Plassen

Three of the four great Norwegian authors are connected to Molde. Bjørnstjerne Bjørnson spent his childhood years at Nesset Municipality outside Molde, and attended school in the city. Henrik Ibsen frequently spent his vacations at the mansion Moldegård visiting the family Møller; and Alexander Kielland resided in the city as the governor of Romsdals amt. Ibsen's play Rosmersholm is generally thought to be inspired by life at the mansion Moldegård, and The Lady from the Sea is also believed to be set in the city of Molde, although never actually mentioned. Other authors from or with ties to Molde include Edvard Hoem, Jo Nesbø, Knut Ødegård, and Nini Roll Anker, a friend of Sigrid Undset.

The Romsdal Museum, one of Norway's largest folk museums, was established in 1912. Buildings originating from all over the region have been moved here to form a typical cluster of farm buildings including "open hearth" houses, sheds, outhouses, smokehouses and a small chapel. The "town street" with Mali's Café shows typical Molde town houses from the pre-World War I period. The Museum of the Fisheries is an open-air museum located on the island of Hjertøya, 10 minutes from the centre of Molde. A small fishing village with authentic buildings, boats and fishing equipment, the museum shows local coastal culture from 1850 onwards.

The local newspaper is Romsdals Budstikke.

=== Churches ===
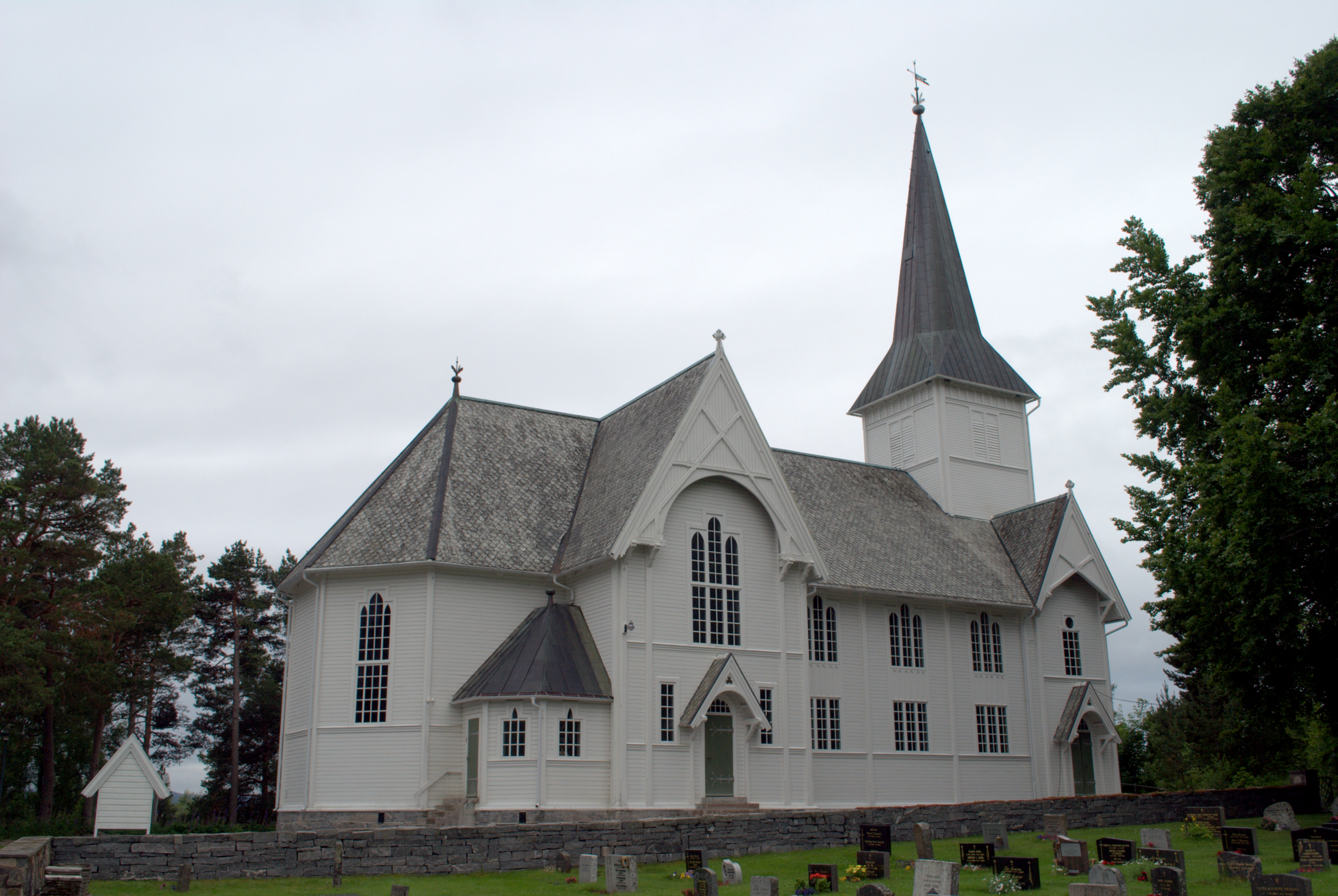
Røbekk Church

The Church of Norway has ten parishes (sokn) within Molde Municipality. It is part of the Molde domprosti (arch-deanery) in the Diocese of Møre.

Churches in Molde
Parish (sokn)	Church name	Location of the church	Year built
Molde	Molde Cathedral	Molde	1957
Bolsøy	Røbekk Church	Røbekk	1898
Bolsøy	Nordbyen Church	Molde	2006
Bolsøy	Bergmo Church	Molde	1982
Eikesdal	Eikesdal Church	Eikesdalen	1866
Eresfjord	Sira Church	Eresfjord	1869
Kleive	Kleive Church	Kleive	1858
Midsund	Otrøy Church	Uglvik, Otrøya	1878
Midsund	Nord-Heggdal Chapel	Nord-Heggdal	1974
Nesset	Nesset Church	Eidsvåg	1878
Røvik og Veøy	Røvik Church	Røvika	1905
Røvik og Veøy	Veøy Church	Sølsnes	1907
Røvik og Veøy	Old Veøy Church	Veøya	c. 1200
Sekken	Sekken Church	Sekken	1908
Vistdal	Vistdal Church	Myklebostad	1869

=== Festivals ===
The Moldejazz jazz festival is held in Molde every July. Moldejazz is one of the largest and oldest jazz festivals in Europe, and one of the most important. An estimated 40,000 tickets are sold for the more than a hundred events during the festival. Between 80,000 and 100,000 visitors visit the city during the one-week-long festival.

Every August, Molde Municipality hosts to the Bjørnson Festival, an international literature festival (Prior to 2020, it was hosted by both Molde and Nesset Municipality – Nesset has since become part of Molde). Established by the poet Knut Ødegård in connection with the 250-year anniversary of Molde, the festival is named in honour of the Nobel Prize in Literature laureate Bjørnstjerne Bjørnson (1832–1910). It is the oldest and the most internationally acclaimed literature festival in Norway.

In addition to the two major events, a number of minor festivals are held annually. Byfest, the city's celebration of incorporation, is an arrangement by local artists, coinciding with the anniversary of the royal charter of 29 June 1742.

== Education ==
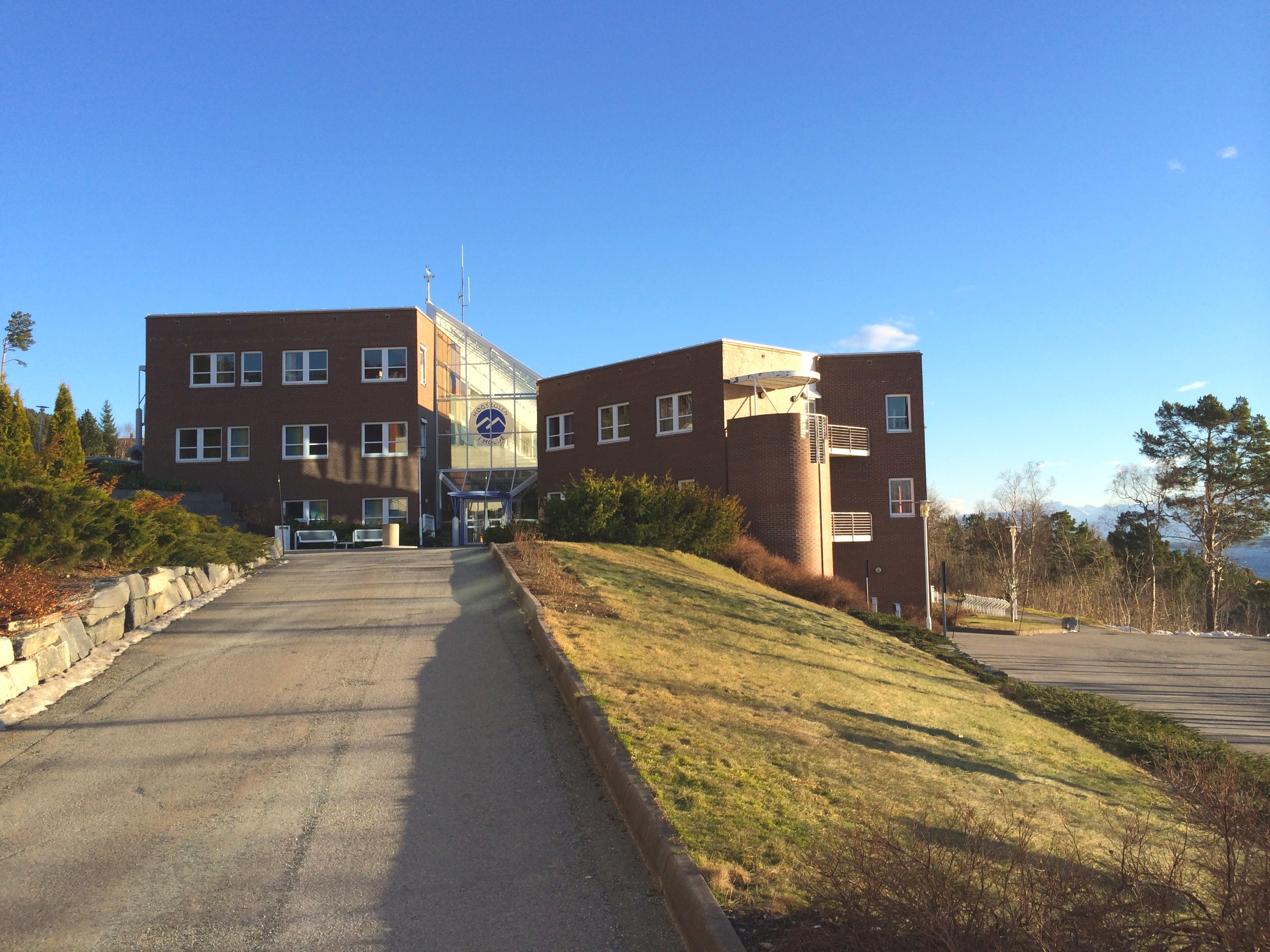
Molde University College in 2014

Molde University College offers a wide range of academic opportunities, from nursing and health-related studies, to economics and administrative courses. The school is Norway's leading college in logistics, and well established as a centre for research and academic programmes in information technology, with degrees up to and including PhD.

== Transportation ==
Hurtigruta calls on Molde every day, on its journey between Bergen and Kirkenes. The nearest railway station is Åndalsnes, the terminus for the Rauma Line.

The local airport is Molde Airport which has several daily flights to Oslo, Bergen, and Trondheim, as well as weekly flights to other domestic and international destinations.

The European route E39 and Norwegian County Road 64 both pass through the municipality. The city of Molde is connected to Fræna Municipality (to the north) by the Tussen Tunnel. The city is connected to the Røvika and Nesjestranda part of the municipality by the Fannefjord Tunnel and Bolsøy Bridge, significantly shortening the drive by avoiding driving all the way around the Fannefjorden. The proposed Langfjord Tunnel would connect Molde Municipality to Rauma Municipality via a tunnel under the Langfjorden.

== Sports ==
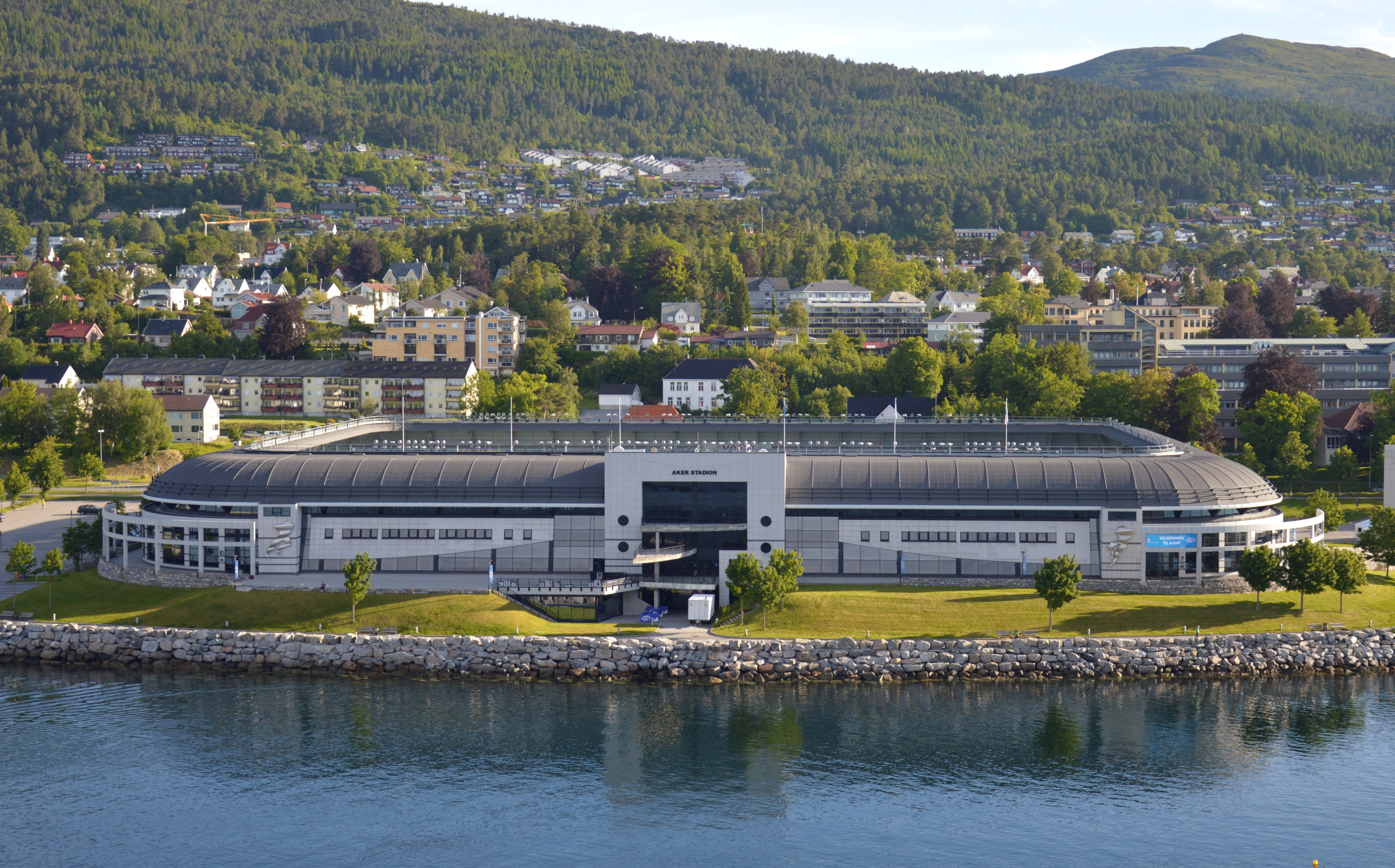
The stadium to Molde FK

Molde hosts a variety of sports teams, most notably the football team, Molde FK, which plays in the Eliteserien, the top division in the Norwegian football league system. Their home matches are played at Aker stadion, inaugurated in 1998, which holds a record attendance of 13,308. The team is five-time league champions (2011, 2012, 2014, 2019 and 2022), five-time Norwegian Cup winners (1994, 2005, 2013, 2014 and 2021–22), and has made numerous appearances in European tournaments, including the UEFA Champions League. The club was founded in 1911, during Molde's period of great British and Continental influx, and was first named "International", since it predominantly played teams made up from crews of foreign vessels visiting the city.

In addition to a number of international players, the city has also produced several ski jumpers, cross-country skiers and alpine skiers of international merit.

Other sports include the accomplished team handball clubs (Molde Elite, SK Træff, SK Rival), athletics teams (IL Molde-Olymp), skiing clubs, basketball and volleyball teams.

== International relations ==
=== Twin towns – sister cities ===
Molde has three sister cities. They are:

- Borås, Sweden
- Mikkeli, Finland
- Vejle, Denmark

== Gallery ==
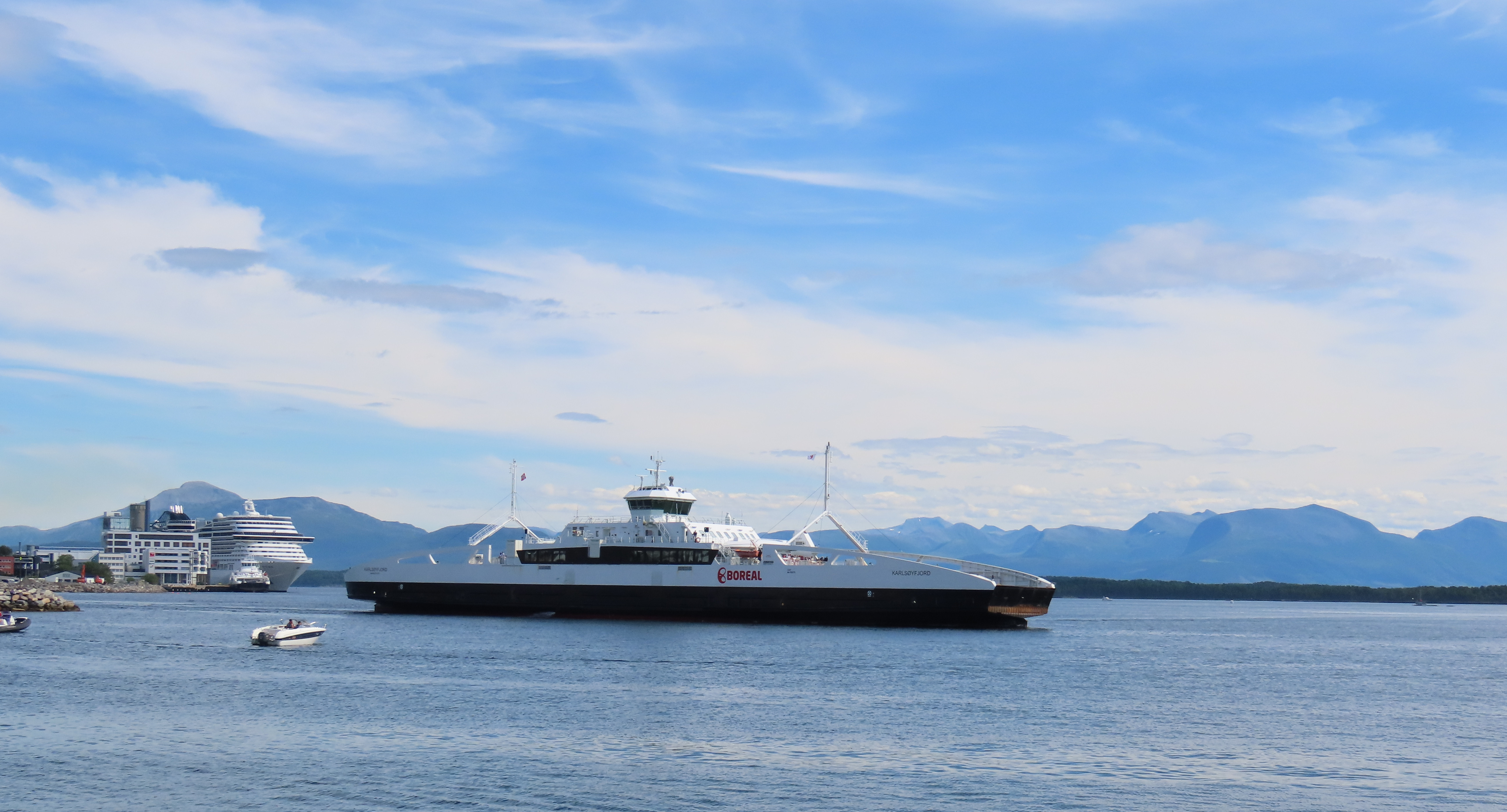
Ferry in Molde in 2024

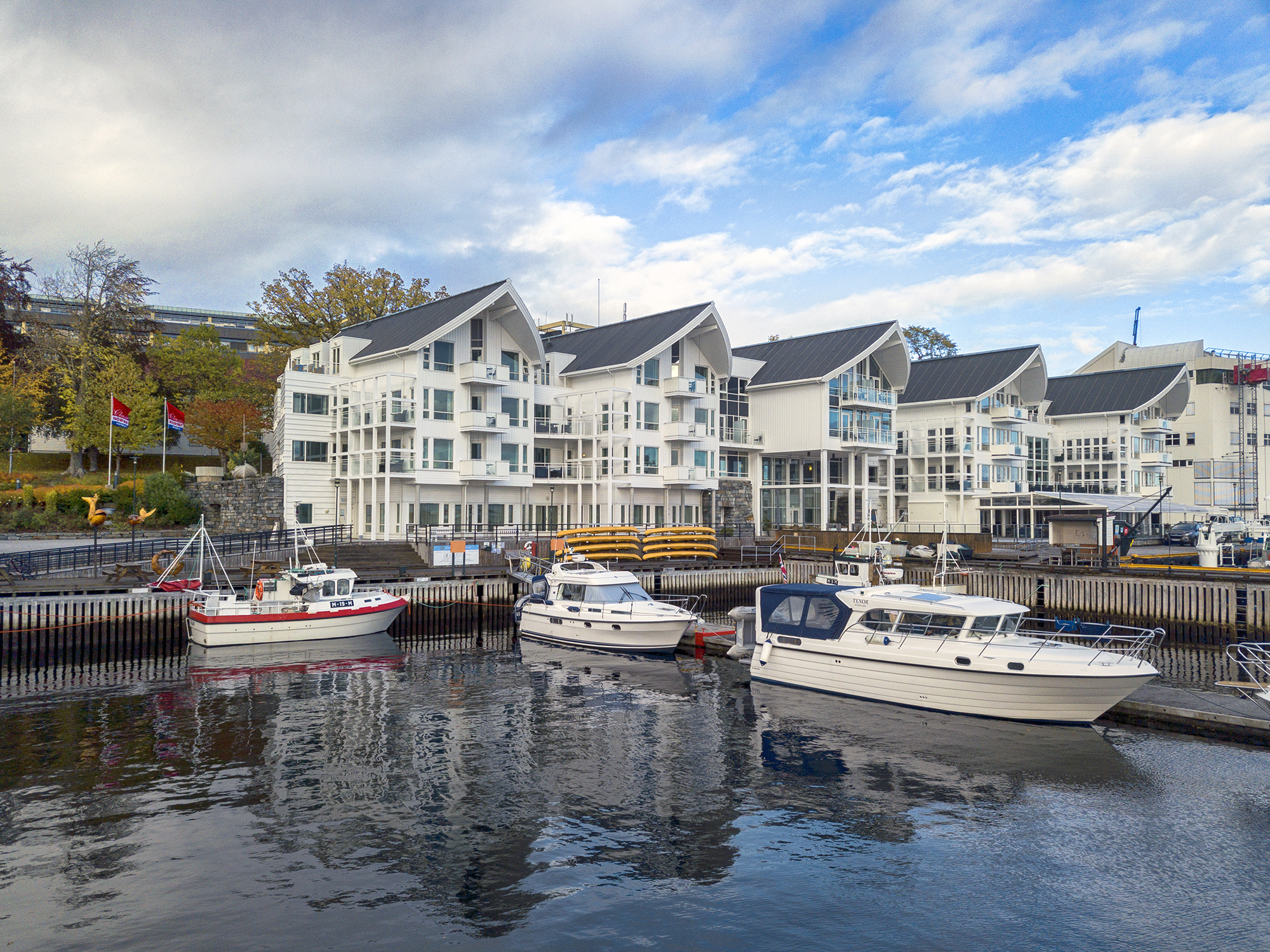
Molde Fjordhotell

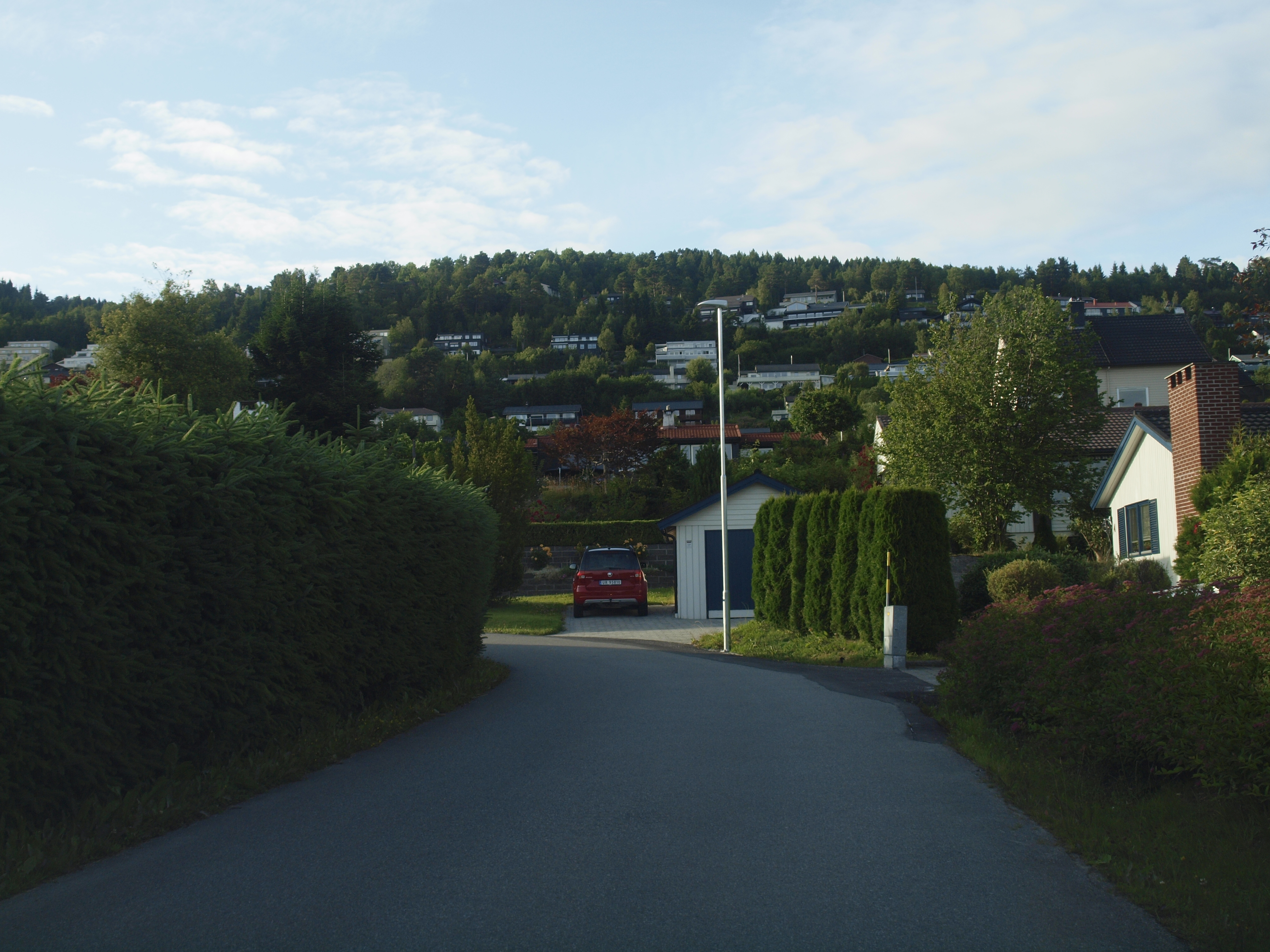
A neighborhood in molde

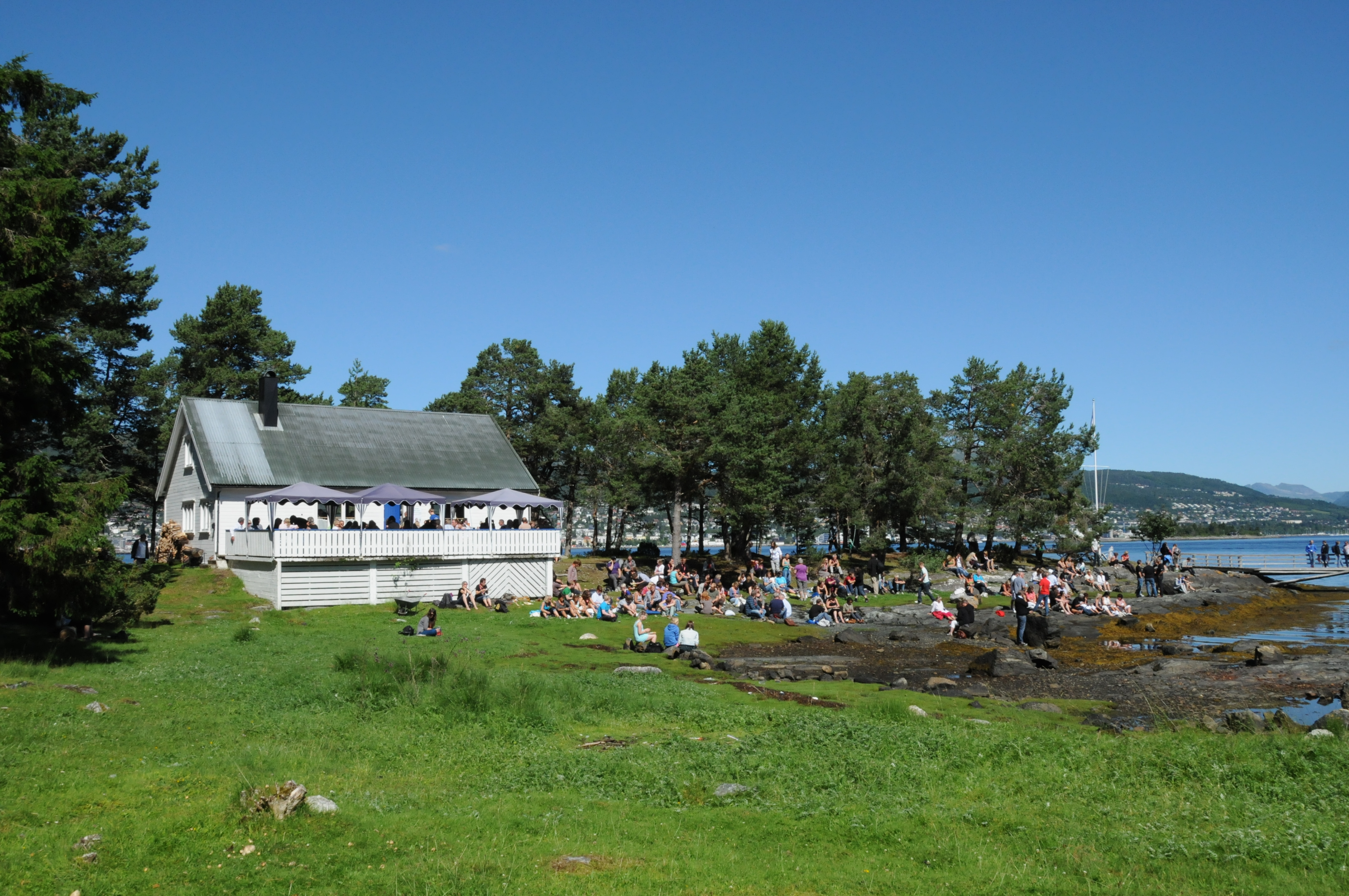
Hjertøya, an island just outside Molde

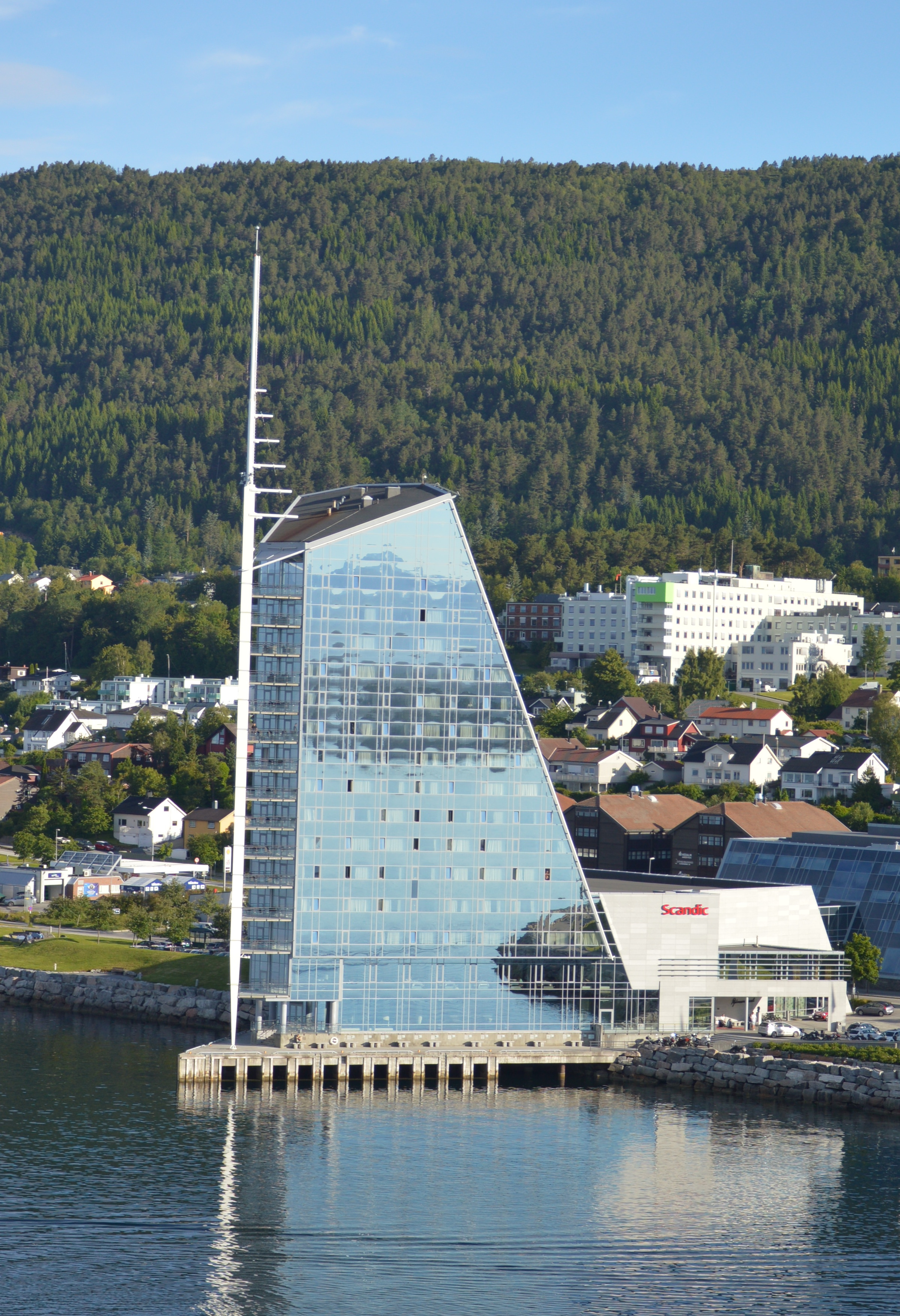
The sixteen-storey Scandic Seilet Hotel in 2017

== Notable people ==
=== Public service and business ===
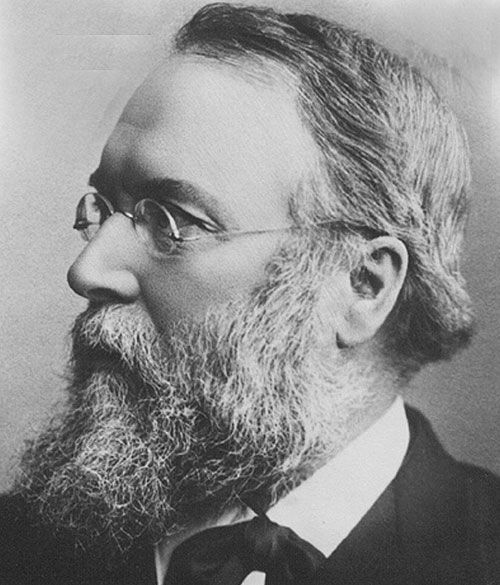
O.A.Qvam, ca.1900

- Nicholas Lawson (1790–1851) Vice governor of Galápagos for Ecuador, born on Sekken
- Ole Anton Qvam (1834–1904) lawyer, politician and Prime Minister of Norway 1902/03
- Dorothea Christensen (1847–1908) a domestic science proponent and politician
- Jacob Tanner, (1865–1964) Norwegian American Lutheran educator and religious author
- Johan Scharffenberg (1869–1965) a psychiatrist, politician, speaker and writer
- Olav Kavli (1872–1958) a businessman who founded the Kavli company
- Jens Arup Seip (1905–1992) medieval historian and interpreter of 1800s political history
- Eystein Fjærli (1917–1987) lieutenant colonel, defence strategist, author and politician
- Arne Solli (1938–2017) Norwegian Army general & Chief of Defence of Norway
- Kjell Magne Bondevik (born 1947) politician, Prime Minister of Norway, 2001–2005
- Bjørn T. Grydeland (born 1949) President of EFTASA & EU Ambassador
- Torgeir Dahl (born 1953) politician and Mayor of Molde since 2011
- Kjell Inge Røkke (born 1958) a Norwegian billionaire

=== The Arts ===
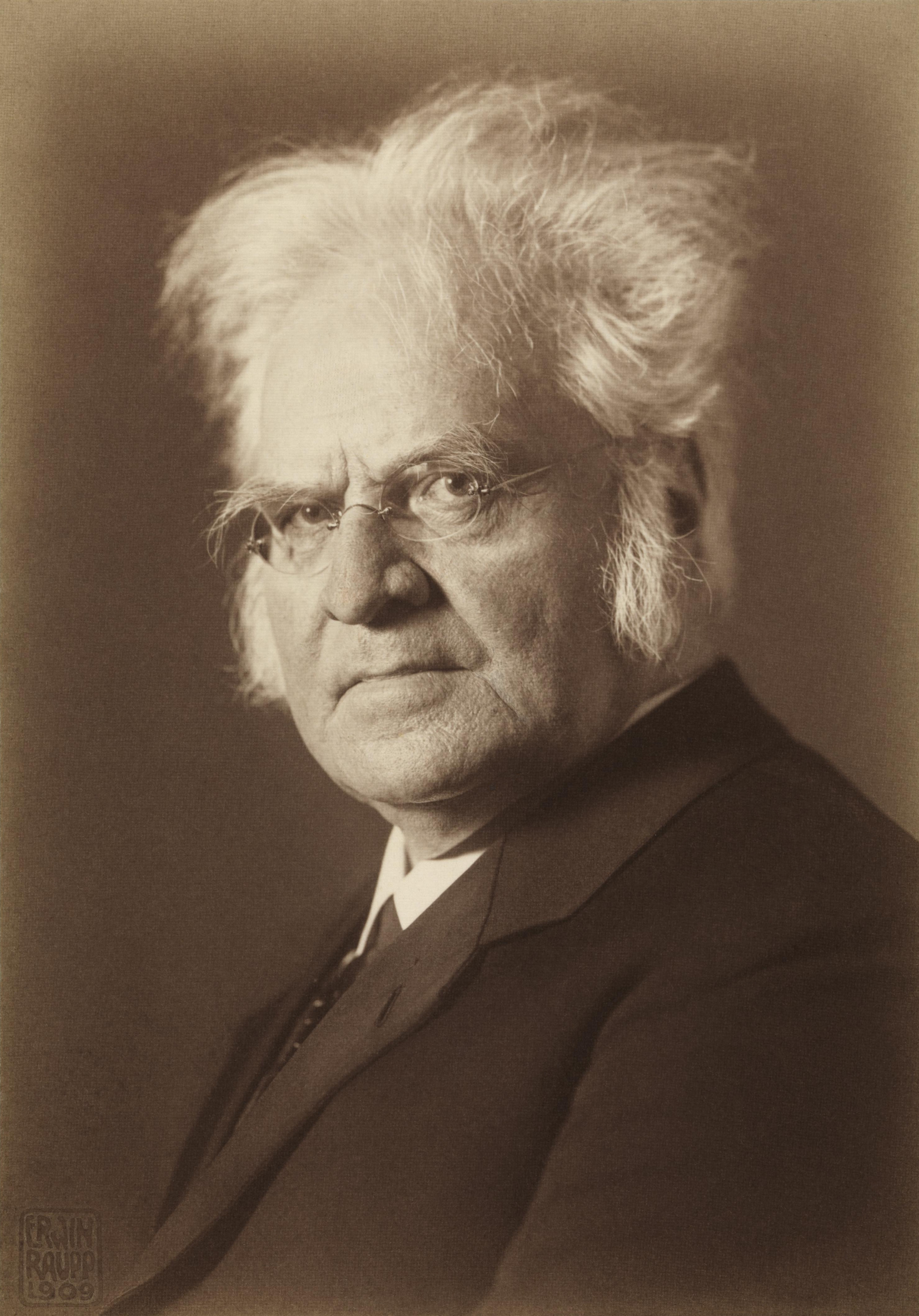
Bjørnstjerne Bjørnson, 1909

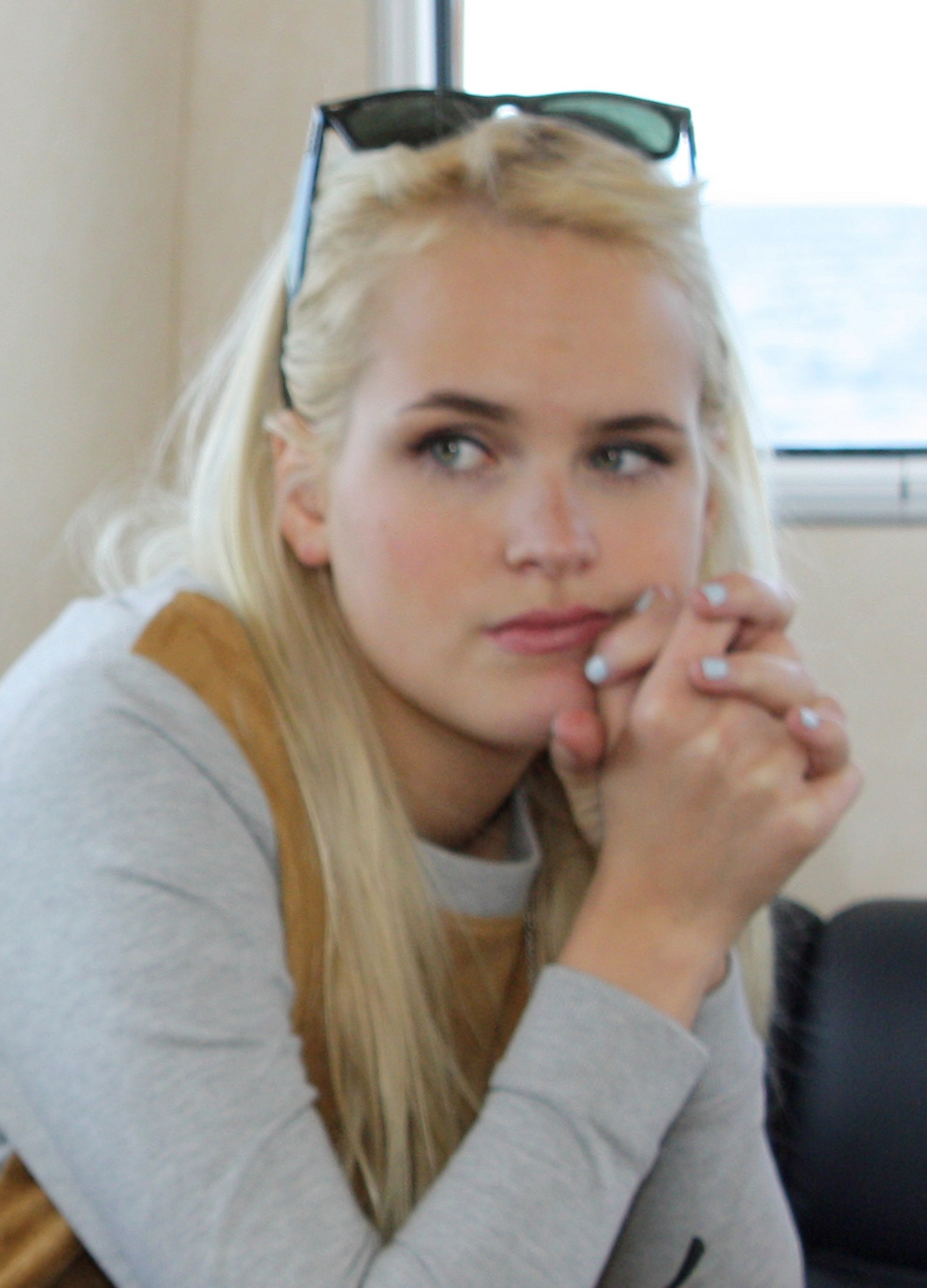
Linnéa Myhre, 2011

- Karen Splid Møller (1800–1880) a Norwegian handwritten cookbook writer
- Bjørnstjerne Bjørnson (1832–1910) writer of noble, magnificent and versatile poetry, won the 1903 Nobel Prize in Literature, brought up in Nesset
- Maurycy Gottlieb (1856–1879) a Polish realist painter of the Romantic period, lived in Molde
- Hanna Hoffmann (1858–1917), Danish sculptor and silversmith
- Rasmus Rasmussen (1862–1932) a Norwegian actor, folk singer and theatre director
- Nini Roll Anker (1873–1942) novelist and playwright about women within different social classes
- Kurt Schwitters, (1887–1948) German artist using dadaism, constructivism and surrealism, had a hut on Hjertøya pre-WWII
- Terje Fjærn (1942–2016) musician, orchestra leader and musical conductor
- Knut Ødegård (born 1945) poet, also lives in Reykjavík, Iceland
- Terje Venaas (born 1947) a Norwegian jazz musician (upright bass)
- Edvard Hoem (born 1949) a Norwegian novelist, dramatist, lyricist and psalmist
- Jo Nesbø (born 1960) a Norwegian writer, musician and economist; grew up in Molde
- Arne Nøst (born 1962) a Norwegian graphic artist and theatre director
- John Arne Sæterøy (born 1965) pen name Jason, cartoonist of silent animal characters
- Ann-Helen Moen (born 1969) a Norwegian lyric soprano
- Paal Nilssen-Love (born 1974) a Norwegian drummer and composer in jazz and free improvisation
- Ane Brun (born 1976) a Norwegian songwriter, guitarist, and vocalist of Sami origin
- Ola Kvernberg (born 1981) a jazz violinist
- Daniel Herskedal (born 1982) a Norwegian jazz tuba player
- Hayden Powell (born 1983) a jazz trumpeter and composer, grew up in Molde
- Mari Kvien Brunvoll (born 1984) a Norwegian folk and jazz singer
- Linnéa Myhre (born 1990) a Norwegian author and blogger
- Tuva Halse (born 1999) a Norwegian violinist, keyboard player, vocalist and composer

=== Sport ===
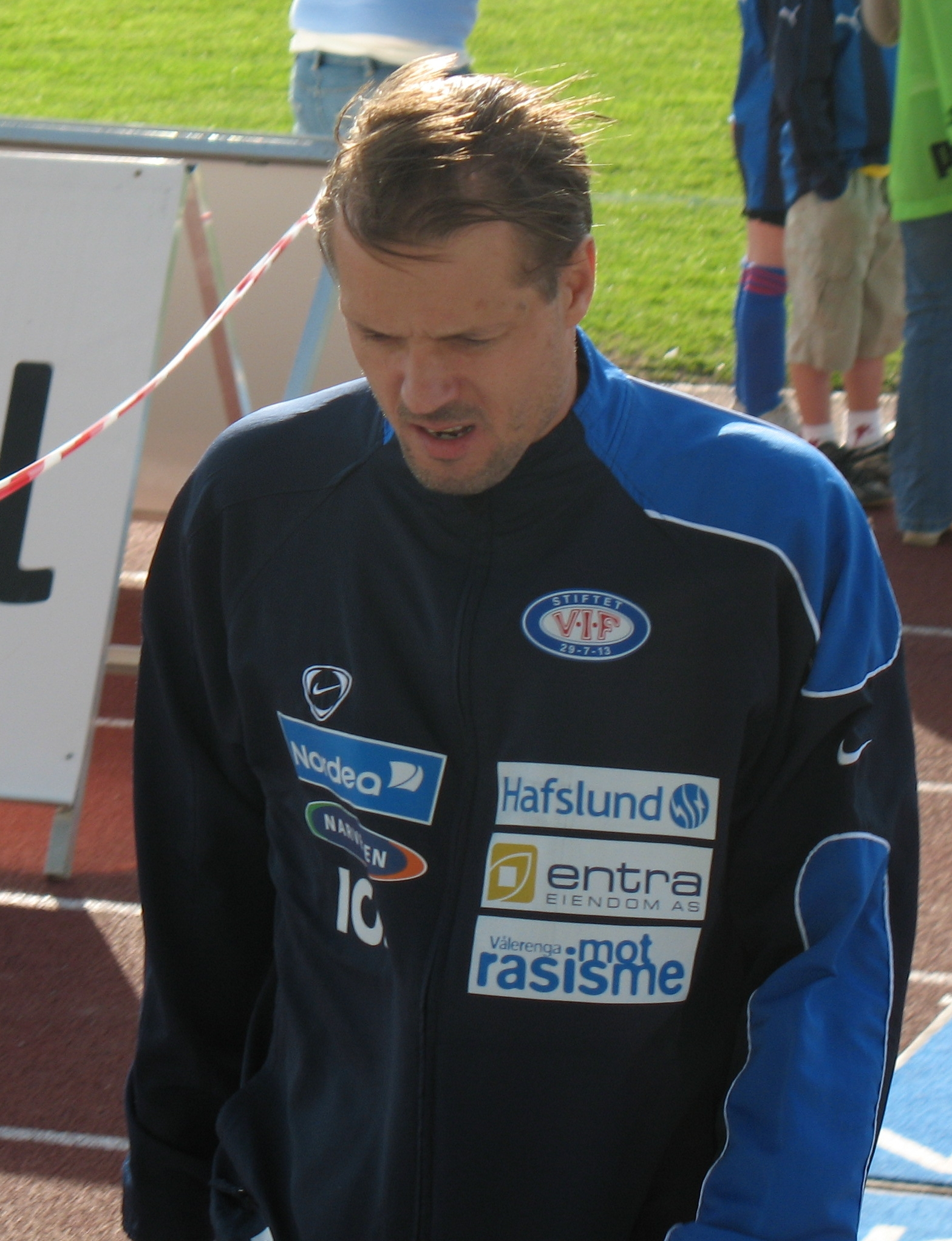
Kjetil Rekdal, 2006

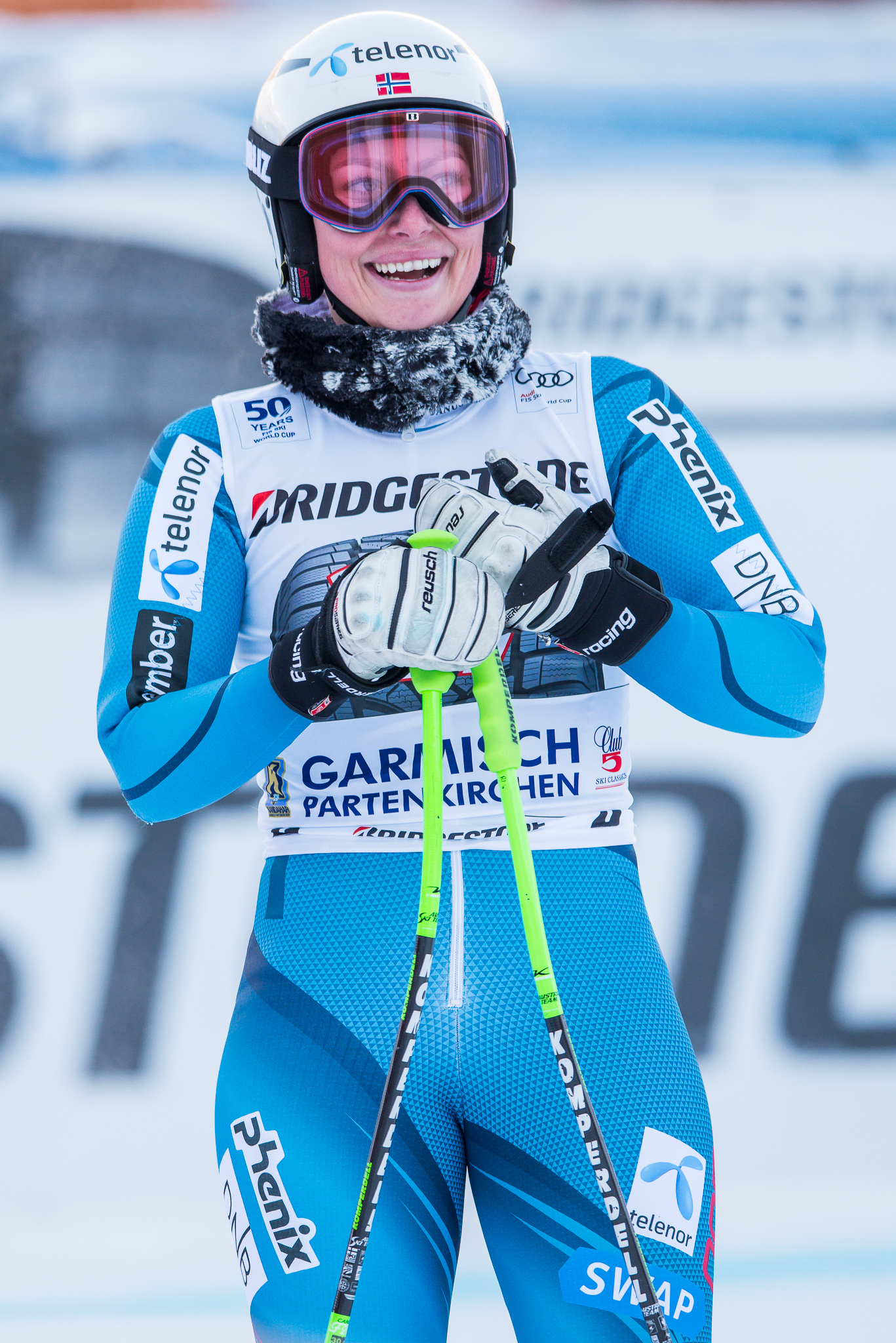
Ragnhild Mowinckel, 2017

- Otto Berg (1906–1991) a long jumper, competed at the 1936 Summer Olympics
- Arne Legernes (born 1931) a retired Norwegian footballer with 41 caps for Norway
- Einar Halle (born 1943) a Norwegian former UEFA football referee and referee observer
- Harry Hestad (born 1944) a former footballer and coach with 412 club caps and 31 for Norway
- Jan Fuglset (born 1945) a former footballer with over 288 club caps and 20 for Norway
- Ingolf Mork (1947–2012) ski jumper, winner of Four Hills Tournament 1971/72
- Arild Monsen (born 1962) cross-country skier, World Champion 1985
- Kjetil Rekdal (born 1968) a football manager and a former player with 484 club caps and 83 for Norway
- Trond Strande (born 1970) a former footballer with 275 caps with Molde FK
- Petter Rudi (born 1973) a retired footballer with 350 club caps and 46 for Norway
- Mette Solli (born 1974) a Norwegian kickboxer, World Champion 2001, 2004, 2007
- Andrine Flemmen (born 1974) a retired giant slalom alpine skier, won three World Cup races
- Kurt Asle Arvesen (born 1975) a Norwegian former professional road bicycle racer
- Daniel Berg Hestad (born 1975) a football manager and a former player with 557 club caps
- John Arne Riise (born 1980) a former footballer with 546 club caps and 110 for Norway
- Christian Gauseth (born 1984) a Norwegian footballer with over 320 club caps
- Johan Remen Evensen (born 1985) ski jumper, former world record-holder in ski flying
- Magnus Wolff Eikrem (born 1990) footballer with over 220 club caps and 17 for Norway
- Ragnhild Mowinckel (born 1992) alpine skier, twice silver medallist at the 2018 Winter Olympics
- Ada Hegerberg (born 1995) a footballer with over 220 club caps and 80 for Norway
