= Røvika =

Village in Molde Municipality, Norway

Røvika Geitnes
- Village
- Interactive map of Røvika; Geitnes
- Location within Møre og Romsdal Location within Norway
- Coordinates: 62.7289°N 7.4208°E
- Country: Norway
- Region: Western Norway
- County: Møre og Romsdal
- District: Romsdal
- Municipality: Molde Municipality

Area
  - Total: 0.3 km^{2} (0.12 sq mi)
- Elevation: 8 m (26 ft)

Population (2024)
  - Total: 356
  - Density: 1,187/km^{2} (3,070/sq mi)
- Time zone: UTC+01:00 (CET)
  - Summer (DST): UTC+02:00 (CEST)
- Post Code: 6456 Skåla

Røvika or Geitnes is a village in Molde Municipality in Møre og Romsdal county, Norway. The village is located at the end of the Karlsøyfjorden on the Romsdal Peninsula, about 10 kilometres (6.2 mi) southeast of the town of Molde and about 3 to 4 kilometres (1.9 to 2.5 mi) north of the villages of Nesjestranda and Sølsnes. The village sits along the Norwegian County Road 64, at the eastern end of the Bolsøy Bridge. Røvik Church is located in the village.

The 0.3-square-kilometre (74-acre) village has a population (2024) of 356 and a population density of 1,187 inhabitants per square kilometre (3,070/sq mi).
