= Jacob Tanner =

Norwegian American Lutheran minister (1865-1964)

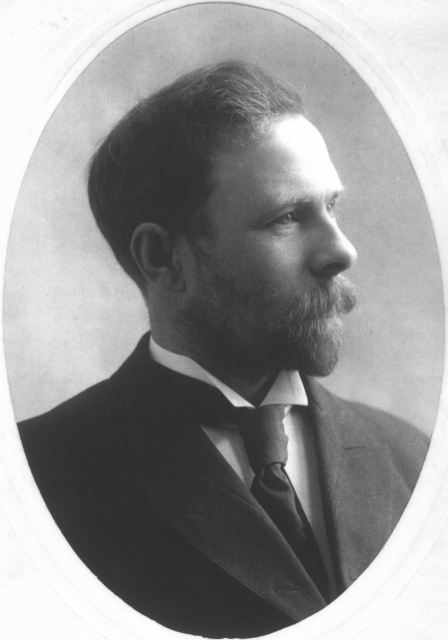
Jacob Tanner

Jacob Tanner (15 October 1865 – 25 January 1964) was a Norwegian American Lutheran minister, educator and religious author. He spent most of his life in the United States and became a naturalized citizen.

== Biography ==
He was born at the farm Leirgrovvik in Bolsøy Municipality (now Molde), Norway, as the eldest son of Swiss dairyman Johannes Tanner (a Zwinglian) and native farmer's daughter Anne Birgitte (née Innholm), who taught her children how to read and instructed them in the Catechism. Jacob was confirmed 24 April 1881, receiving high grades. He was educated in Molde and Kristiania, and became a theologian in 1892. At 27 years of age, he departed from the port of Kristiansand, arriving in New York City, USA, on 19 May 1893.

Jacob served as pastor for congregations in Iowa and New York, and taught at Concordia College in Moorhead, Minnesota from 1916 to 24. In 1924 Tanner became the editor of Lutheraneren – the Norwegian-language organ of the NLCA, where he also served on the Board of Elementary Christian Education. From 1925 to 38, Tanner was a professor of theology at Luther Seminary in Saint Paul, Minnesota. He assembled a collection of small catechisms in translations from around the world, and the Jacob Tanner Catechism Collection forms part of the special collections in the Luther Seminary Library.

After retiring, he taught theology as professor emeritus of Iowa's Waldorf College, whose Tanner Hall is named for him.

He married Ingeborg Sophie Aarøe in April 1893. They had five children. Jacob Tanner dictated his autobiography in 1960. He died at 98 years of age in a nursing home in Minnesota.

== Selected works ==
He published several books on the Lutheran faith. Some of his works are translated into other languages, including Chinese.

- Ten Studies in the Catechism (1927)
- Ten Studies on the Child (1929)
- Ten Studies in Church Doctrines (1930)
- Ten Studies in Religious Pedagogy (1932)
- Ten Studies in Biblical History (1935)
- The Senior Confirmation Book (1941)
- The Junior Confirmation Book (1943)
- Atonement and Forgiveness: a Re-Orientation (1948)
- Ten Studies in the Creed (1950)
- Exploring God's Word: a Study Guide to Bible Teachings (1950)

== Literature ==
- E. Clifford Nelson, Eugene L. Fevold, The Lutheran Church among Norwegian-Americans: a History of the Evangelical Lutheran Church (Augsburg Publishing House, Minneapolis 1960, ISBN B0007E9B54)
