= Molde panorama =

View from the town of Molde, Norway

Coordinates: 62.7375°N 7.1591°E

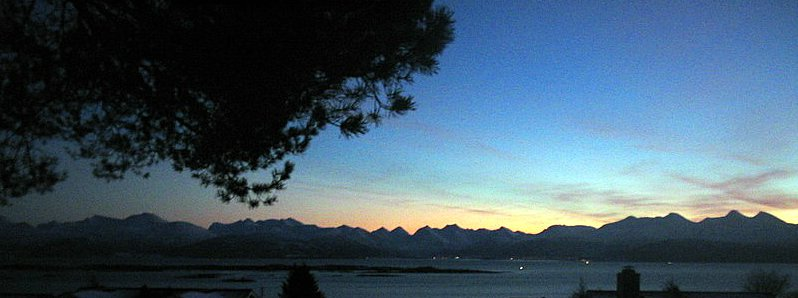
December night in Molde.

The Molde panorama is the renowned panoramic view of some 222 partly snow-clad peaks, seen from the town of Molde in Molde Municipality in Møre og Romsdal county, Norway. It can be observed from all over the town, but the viewpoint from the top of Varden, a 404-metre (1,325 ft) tall hill behind the city, is generally considered to offer the best view.

The mountains of the panorama are located about 15–40 kilometres (9.3–24.9 mi) to the south, southeast, and southwest of Molde, and therefore often creates dramatic displays of changing colors and contrasts in the shifting light throughout the day, and when reflecting in the Romsdalsfjord.

The panorama has been a major tourist attraction for over 150 years.
