= Nesjestranda =

Village in Molde Municipality, Norway

- Village
- Interactive map of Nesjestranda
- Location within Møre og Romsdal Location within Norway
- Coordinates: 62.6971°N 7.4318°E
- Country: Norway
- Region: Western Norway
- County: Møre og Romsdal
- District: Romsdal
- Municipality: Molde Municipality

Area
  - Total: 0.44 km^{2} (0.17 sq mi)
- Elevation: 18 m (59 ft)

Population (2024)
  - Total: 539
  - Density: 1,225/km^{2} (3,170/sq mi)
- Time zone: UTC+01:00 (CET)
  - Summer (DST): UTC+02:00 (CEST)
- Post Code: 6456 Skåla

Nesjestranda is a small village situated along Romsdal Fjord in Molde Municipality, Møre og Romsdal county, Norway. It is located along Norwegian County Road 64 on the Romsdal Peninsula facing the islands of Sekken and Veøya, just north of the mouth of the Langfjorden.

The 0.44-square-kilometre (110-acre) village has a population (2024) of 539 and a population density of 1,225 inhabitants per square kilometre (3,170/sq mi).

Since 1991, it has been connected to the town of Molde via the Bolsøy Bridge, the island of Bolsøya, and the undersea Fannefjord Tunnel. Prior to this, the inhabitants were dependent on a ferry between Lønset and Grønnes or a long drive around the entire Fannefjorden. One of the most important industries in Nesjestranda is a furniture factory called Nesje, formerly called Nesjestranda Møbelfabrikk.

Veøy Church is located just south of Nesjestranda in the village of Sølsnes.

== Notable residents ==
- Leo Eitinger, a fugitive who hid here during World War II
- Rikke Flovikholm, one of the longest working church organists (once noted in the Guinness Book of Records)
