= Røvik Church =

Church in Møre og Romsdal, Norway

- Røvik kyrkje
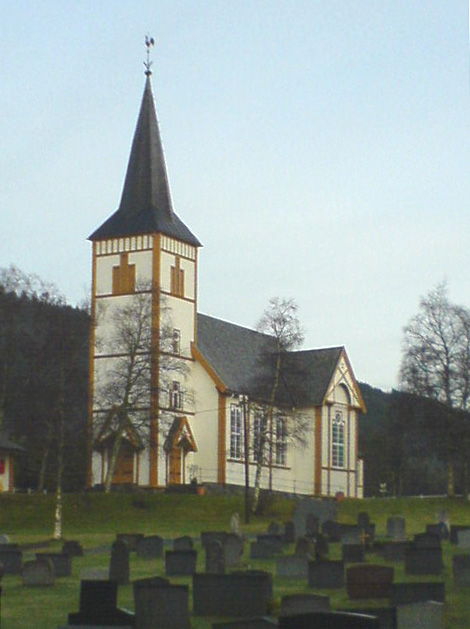
- View of the church
- Røvik Church
- 62°43′57″N 7°25′30″E
- Location: Molde Municipality, Møre og Romsdal
- Country: Norway
- Denomination: Church of Norway
- Churchmanship: Evangelical Lutheran

History
- Status: Parish church
- Founded: 1905
- Consecrated: 1905

Architecture
- Functional status: Active
- Architect: Gabriel Smith
- Architectural type: Long church
- Style: Swiss chalet style
- Completed: 1905 (121 years ago)

Specifications
- Capacity: 200
- Materials: Wood

Administration
- Diocese: Møre bispedømme
- Deanery: Molde domprosti
- Parish: Røvik og Veøy
- Norwegian Cultural Heritage Site
- Type: Church
- Status: Listed
- ID: 85347

Røvik Church (Norwegian: Røvik kyrkje) is a parish church of the Church of Norway in Molde Municipality in Møre og Romsdal county, Norway. It is located in the village of Røvika. It is an annex church for the Røvik og Veøy parish which is part of the Molde domprosti (arch-deanery) in the Diocese of Møre. The white, wooden church was built in a long church design in the Swiss chalet style in 1905 by the architect Gabriel Smith. The church seats about 200 people.

== History ==
Prior to the 20th century, the Bolsøy Church served most of the area around what is now the town of Molde. The church sat on the island of Bolsøya. By the 1890s, discussions were had on moving the church to the mainland. Eventually, it was decided to build two new churches, a new Røbekk Church on the mainland north of the island of Bolsøya and another new church at Røvika to serve the mainland to the southeast of the island of Bolsøya. On 2 May 1896, the Røvika area established as its own parish after it was split off from the Bolsøy Church parish. Bolsøy Church continued to be used until both new churches were completed. The new Røbekk Church was built first, and when that was completed, planning began for the Røvik Church. The architect Gabriel Smith was hired to make designs for the building and Eirik Sylte from Tresfjord was hired as the lead builder. The church was completed and consecrated in 1905. Most of the furniture from the old church on Bolsøya was moved to the new Røvik Church. The old Bolsøy Church was torn down in 1907.

== See also ==
- List of churches in Møre
