= Bolsøy Bridge =

Bridge in Møre og Romsdal, Norway

Bolsøy Bridge Bolsøybrua
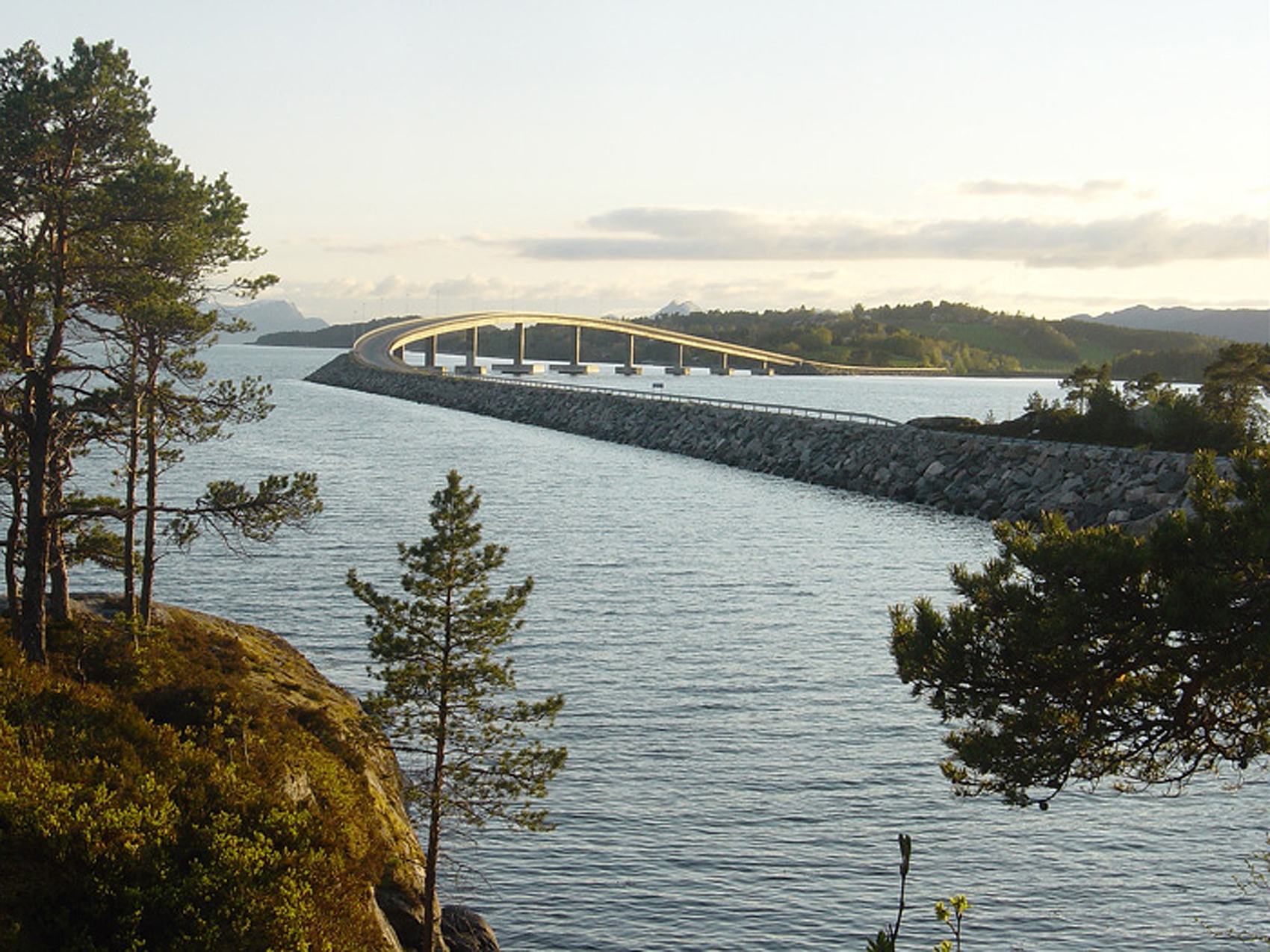
- View of the Bolsøy Bridge
- Coordinates: 62°43′52″N 07°21′23″E
- Carries: Fv64
- Locale: Molde, Møre og Romsdal, Norway

Characteristics
- Design: Beam bridge
- Material: Concrete
- Total length: 555 metres (1,821 ft)
- Longest span: 55 metres (180 ft)
- No. of spans: 11
- Clearance below: 16 metres (52 ft)

History
- Opened: 1991

Bolsøy Bridge (Norwegian: Bolsøybrua) is a concrete beam bridge in Molde Municipality, Møre og Romsdal county, Norway. The bridge crosses the Bolsøysund strait between the mainland and the island of Bolsøya. Bolsøy Bridge was opened in 1991 as part of County Road 64, and together with the Fannefjord Tunnel, they form a ferry-free connection from the town of Molde and the island of Bolsøya to the village of Nesjestranda on the mainland.

The 555-metre-long (1,821 ft) bridge is located 10 kilometres (6.2 mi) southeast of the town of Molde. The bridge has 11 spans, the longest of which is 55 metres (180 ft) long and the maximum clearance to the sea is 16 metres (52 ft).

== See also ==
- List of bridges in Norway
- List of bridges in Norway by length
- List of bridges by length
