= Molde Archipelago =

Archipelago in Møre og Romsdal, Norway

Molde Archipelago Moldeøyene; Moldeholmene
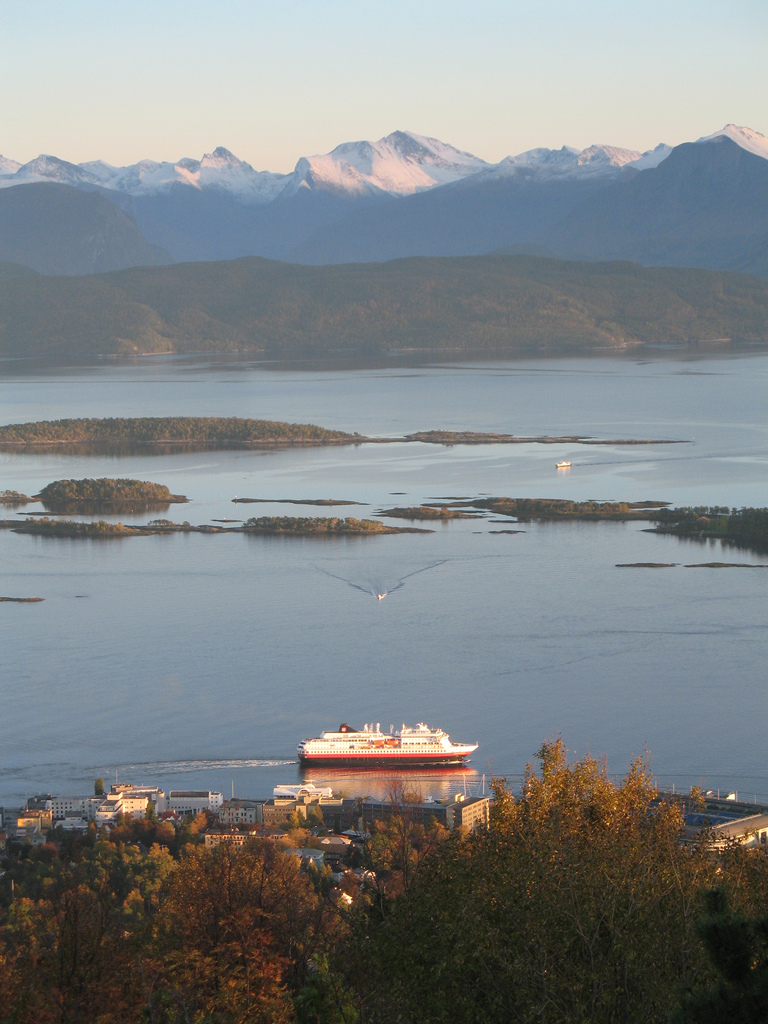
- View of some of the islands off of Molde
- Interactive map of Molde Archipelago; Moldeøyene; Moldeholmene

Geography
- Location: Møre og Romsdal, Norway
- Coordinates: 62°43′6″N 7°10′10″E
- Adjacent to: Moldefjorden
- Total islands: 50
- Major islands: Hjertøya, Seterøya

Administration
- Norway
- County: Møre og Romsdal
- Municipality: Molde Municipality

The Molde Archipelago (Norwegian: Moldeøyene; Moldeholmene) is a chain of about 50 tree-clad islands and islets, about 2 kilometres (1.2 mi) south the town of Molde in Molde Municipality, Møre og Romsdal county, Norway. The islands lie across the Moldefjorden from the town of Molde.

The archipelago is public, protected land, and a recreational resort. The main island, Hjertøya, hosts the Museum of Fisheries, a collection of maritime culture from the 17th-19th centuries, and is serviced by water taxi from Molde.

Access to the islands is free and unrestricted, but in compliance with the guidelines from Molde's municipal park and environmental department.
