= Bolsøya =

Island in Møre og Romsdal, Norway

- Interactive map of Bolsøya

Geography
- Location: Møre og Romsdal, Norway
- Coordinates: 62.7307°N 7.3275°E
- Area: 5.2 km^{2} (2.0 sq mi)
- Highest elevation: 69 m (226 ft)
- Highest point: Farøyura

Administration
- Norway
- County: Møre og Romsdal
- Municipality: Molde Municipality

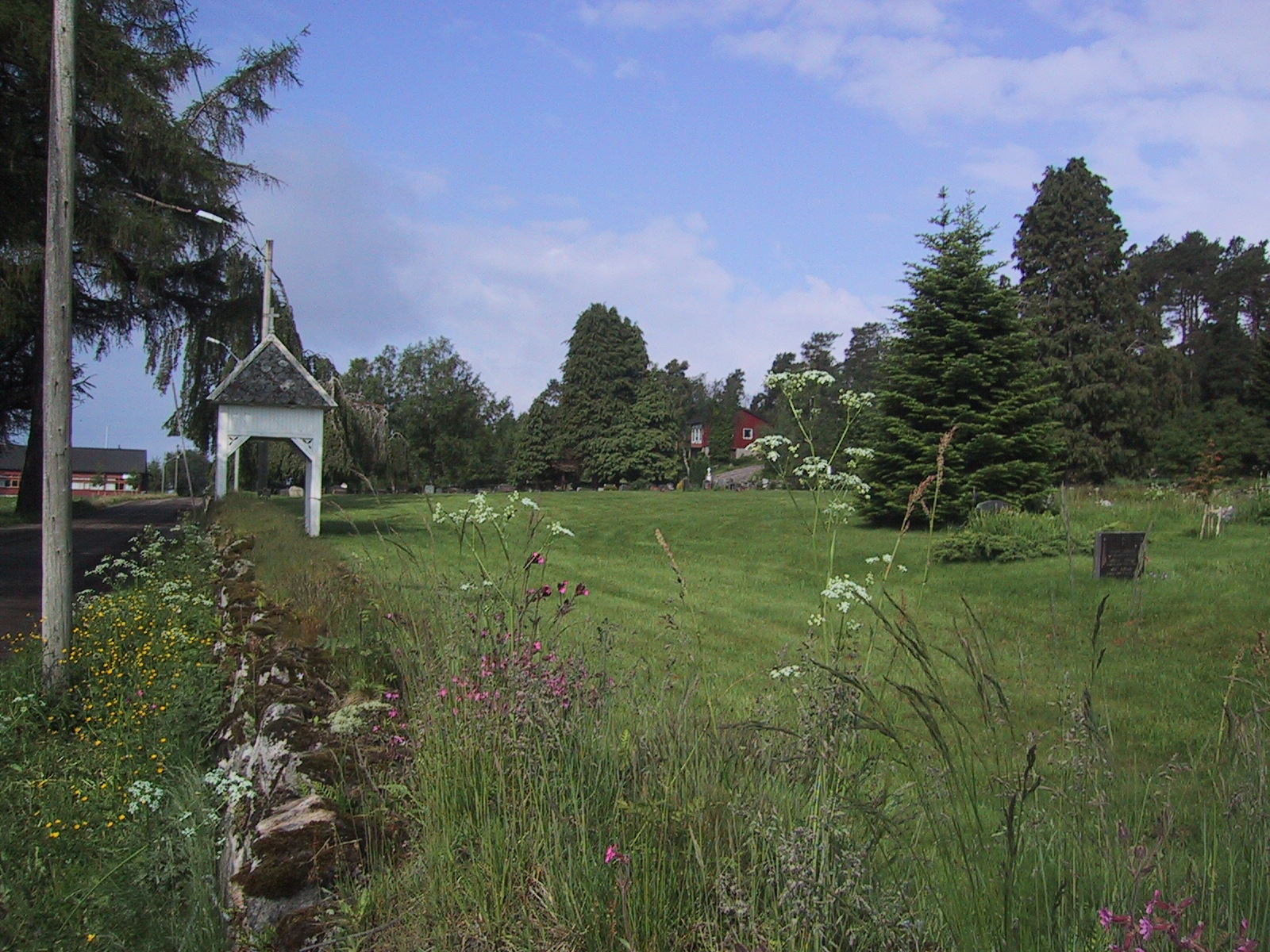
Bolsøy old church site in Bolsøya

Bolsøya is an island in Molde Municipality in Møre og Romsdal county, Norway. The 5.2-square-kilometre (2.0 sq mi) island lies in the Romsdalsfjorden at the entrance to the Fannefjorden. The island is connected to the mainland by the Bolsøy Bridge and to the town of Molde by the Fannefjord Tunnel, both on County Road 64.

The island is unique due to its 6-kilometre-long (3.7 mi) finger-shaped peninsula that is only 400 metres (1,300 ft) wide at its widest. The Molde archipelago lies just to the west of the island and the islands of Sekken and Veøya lie about 4 kilometres (2.5 mi) to the south. The island was the namesake of the old Bolsøy Municipality (which was merged into Molde Municipality in 1964). The historic site of Bolsøy Church was on this island, but the church was moved to Røbekk on the mainland and the old church was torn down in 1906.

== See also ==
- List of islands of Norway
