= Røbekk Church =

Church in Møre og Romsdal, Norway

- Røbekk kirke Historic name: Bolsøy kirke
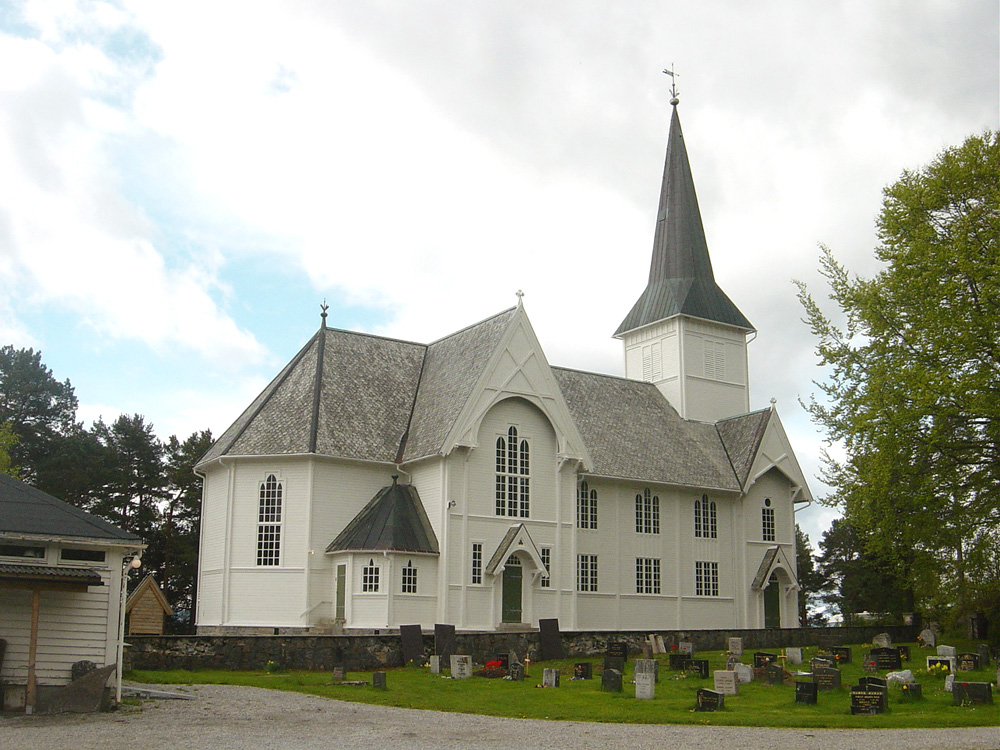
- View of the church
- Røbekk Church
- 62°45′10″N 7°17′38″E
- Location: Molde Municipality, Møre og Romsdal
- Country: Norway
- Denomination: Church of Norway
- Churchmanship: Evangelical Lutheran

History
- Status: Parish church
- Founded: 14th century
- Consecrated: 30 September 1898

Architecture
- Functional status: Active
- Architect: Gabriel Smith
- Architectural type: Long church
- Completed: 1898 (128 years ago)

Specifications
- Capacity: 300
- Materials: Wood

Administration
- Diocese: Møre bispedømme
- Deanery: Molde domprosti
- Parish: Bolsøy
- Norwegian Cultural Heritage Site
- Type: Church
- Status: Not protected
- ID: 85330

Røbekk Church (Norwegian: Røbekk kirke, historic: Bolsøy kirke) is a parish church of the Church of Norway in Molde Municipality in Møre og Romsdal county, Norway. It is located in the village of Røbekk, an eastern suburb of the town of Molde. It is the main church for the Bolsøy parish which is part of the Molde domprosti (arch-deanery) in the Diocese of Møre. The white, wooden church was built in a long church design in 1898 by the architect Gabriel Smith. The church seats about 300 people.

== History ==
The earliest existing historical records of the church date back to the year 1589, but that was not the year it was built. The first church here was likely a wooden stave church that was built in the 14th century. Historically, the church was known as Bolsøy Church. The church was originally built on the island of Bolsøya, about 2.5 kilometres (1.6 mi) south of the present church site. Originally, the building was a long church, but around the year 1660, the church was expanded by adding transepts to the north and south to create a cruciform building. By the 1720s, the old church was no longer in good condition. In 1727, a new wooden, timber-framed church was constructed about 30 metres (98 ft) east of the old church. After the new building was completed, the old church was torn down.

In 1814, this church served as an election church (Norwegian: valgkirke). Together with more than 300 other parish churches across Norway, it was a polling station for elections to the 1814 Norwegian Constituent Assembly which wrote the Constitution of Norway. This was Norway's first national elections. Each church parish was a constituency that elected people called "electors" who later met together in each county to elect the representatives for the assembly that was to meet at Eidsvoll Manor later that year.

By the 1890s, discussions were had on moving the church to the mainland. Eventually, it was decided to build two new churches. The old Bolsøy Church site would be moved to Røbekk on the mainland north of the island of Bolsøya and the church would be known as Røbekk Church. The southeastern part of the parish would be split off as an annex church (Røvik Church) at Røvika on the mainland to the southeast of the island of Bolsøya. The old Bolsøy Church would continue to be used until both new churches were completed. On 2 May 1896, the new annex parish was created for the soon-to-be-built Røvik Church. The new Røbekk Church was built first, being completed in 1898. The church was designed by Gabriel Smith and built by the carpenter Sivert Erstad. It was consecrated on 30 September 1898. The new Røvik Church was built second, begin completed in 1905. The old Bolsøy Church was torn down in 1907. Since the old Bolsøy Church was torn down, the Røbekk Church has also been referred to as Bolsøy Church since it is the main church for the Bolsøy parish.

== Media gallery ==
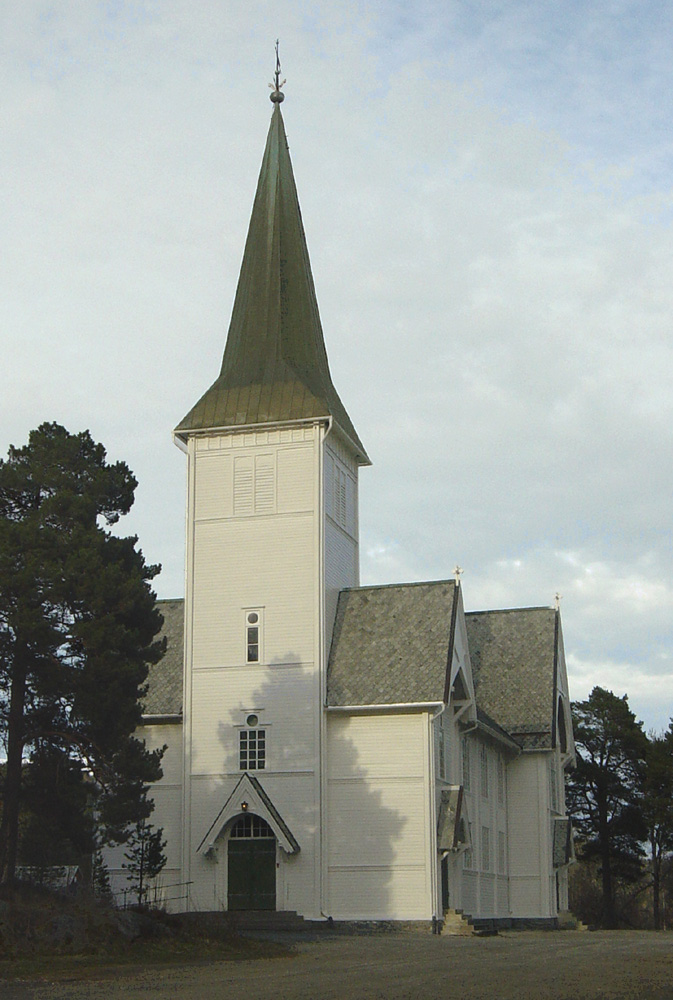
Front view

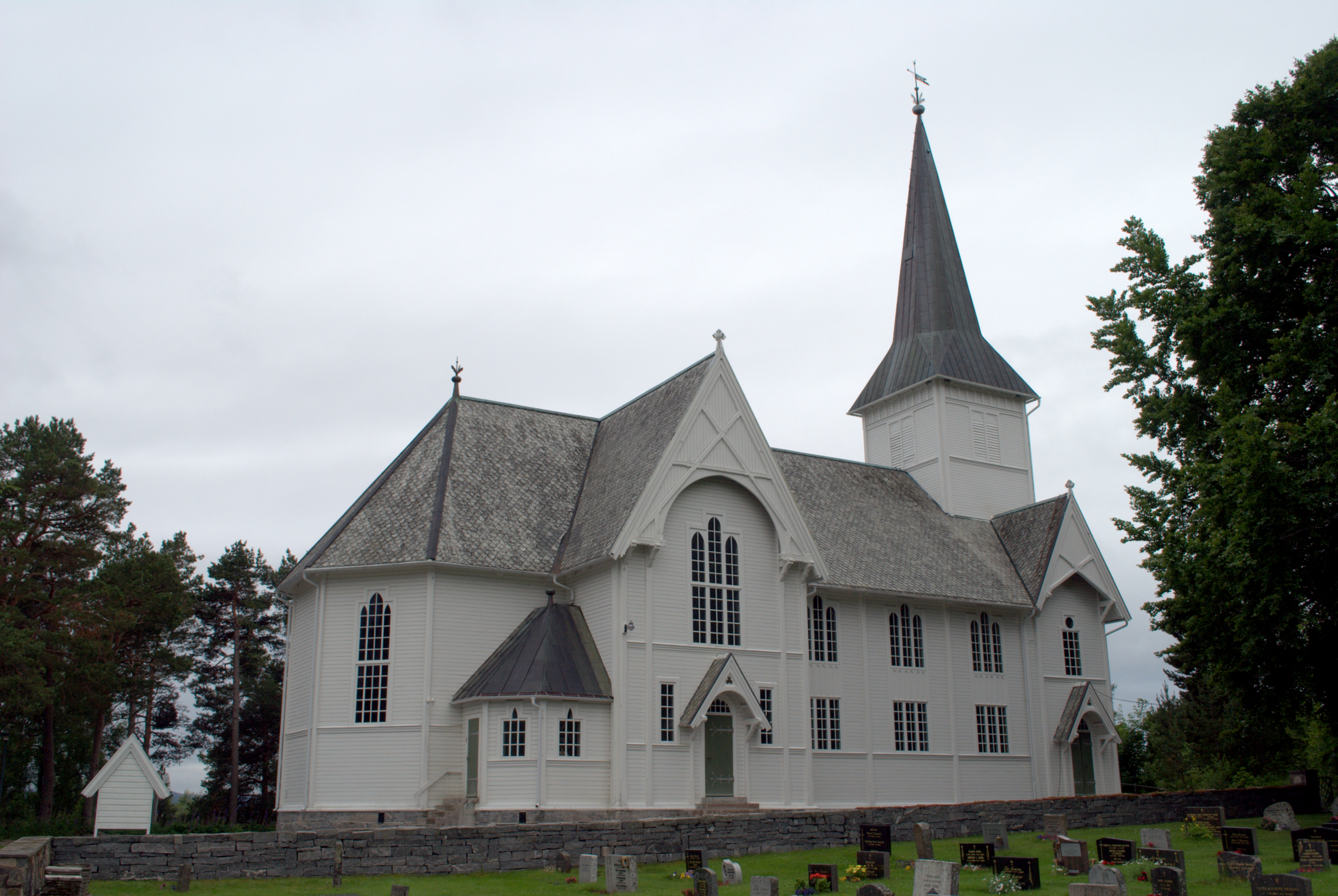
Side view

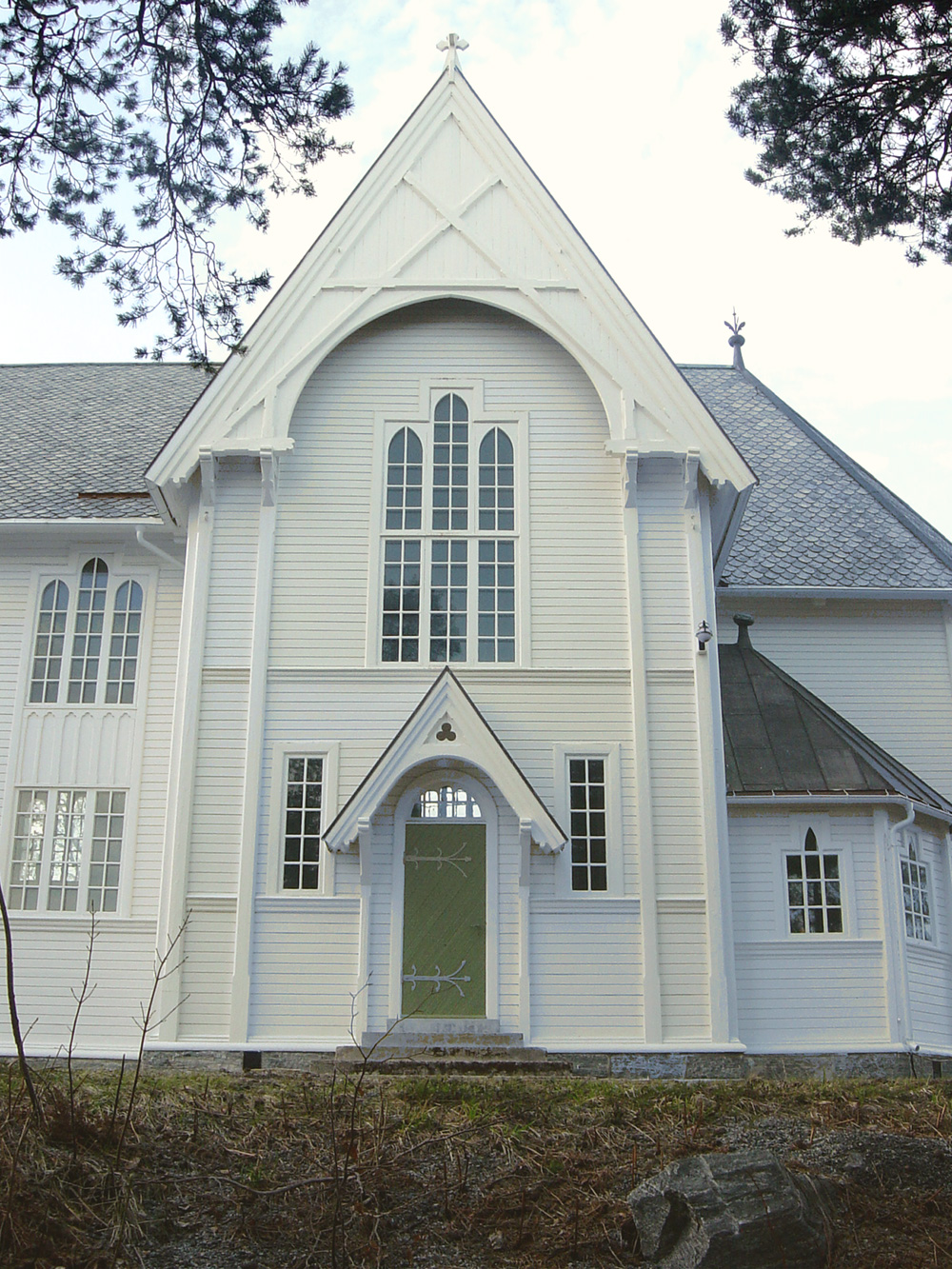
Close up side view

== See also ==
- List of churches in Møre
