= Røbekk =

Village in Molde Municipality, Norway

- Neighborhood in Molde
- Interactive map of Røbekk
- Location within Møre og Romsdal Location within Norway
- Coordinates: 62.7537°N 7.2995°E
- Country: Norway
- Region: Western Norway
- County: Møre og Romsdal
- District: Romsdal
- Municipality: Molde Municipality

Area
  - Total: 0.21 km^{2} (0.081 sq mi)
- Elevation: 25 m (82 ft)

Population (2007)
  - Total: 310
  - Density: 1,476/km^{2} (3,820/sq mi)
- Time zone: UTC+01:00 (CET)
  - Summer (DST): UTC+02:00 (CEST)
- Post Code: 6421 Molde

Røbekk is a neighborhood on the eastern edge of the town of Molde which is located in Molde Municipality in Møre og Romsdal county, Norway. The neighborhood is located on the northern shore of the Fannefjorden, about 7 kilometres (4.3 mi) east of the centre of the town of Molde. Røbekk Church has been located in this village since 1898.

The Årø neighborhood (and the location of Molde Airport, Årø) lies immediately to the west of Røbekk. The European route E39 highway runs through the village on its way from the town of Molde towards the village of Batnfjordsøra in Gjemnes Municipality.

The 0.21-square-kilometre (52-acre) village had a population (2007) of 310 and a population density of 1,476 inhabitants per square kilometre (3,820/sq mi). Since 2007, the village has been considered to be part of the town of Molde so the population and area data for this area has not been separately tracked by Statistics Norway.
