= Fannefjord Tunnel =

Undersea road tunnel in Møre og Romsdal, Norway

Fannefjord Tunnel Fannefjordtunnelen
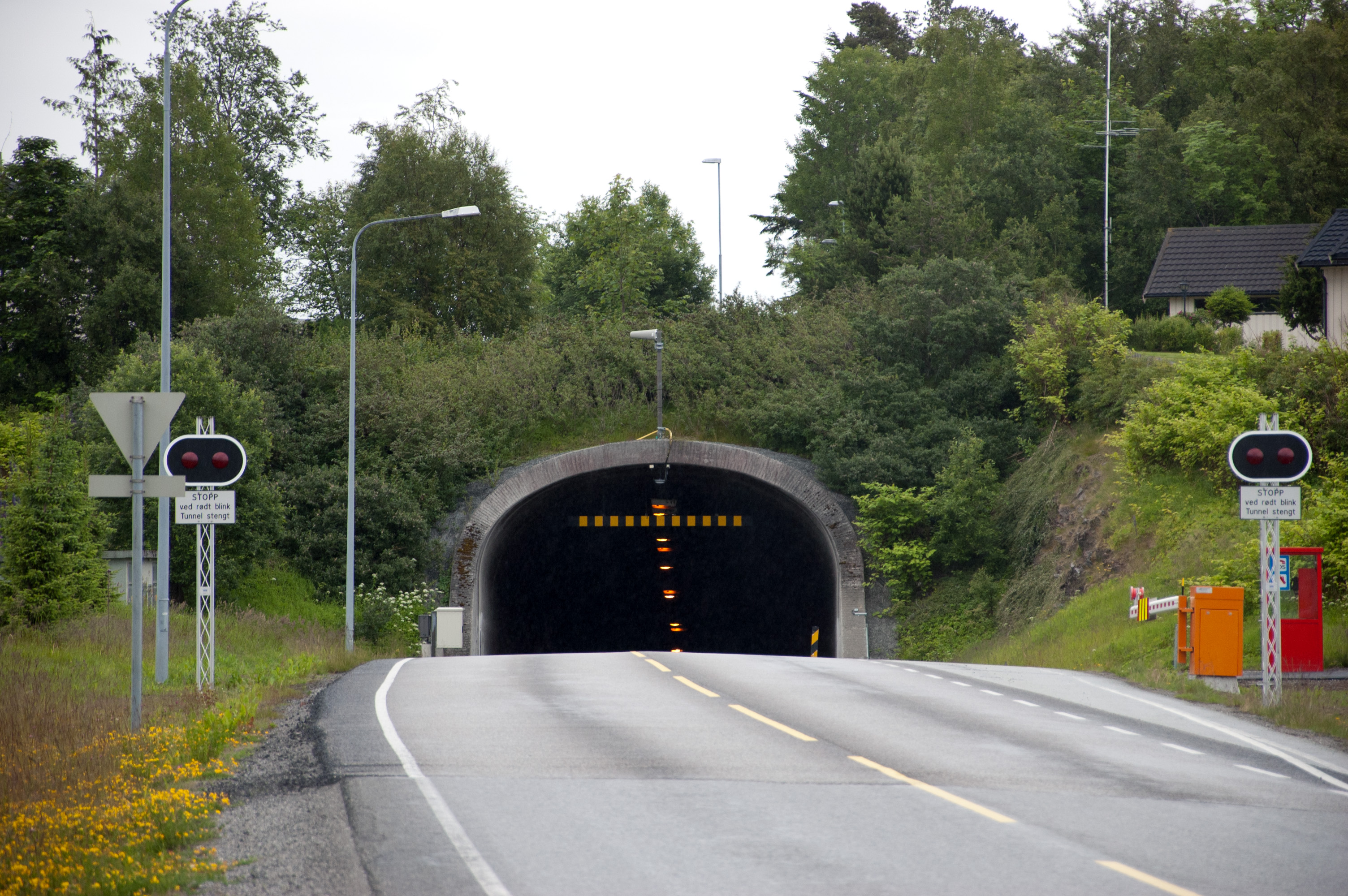
- View of the tunnel
- Interactive map of Fannefjord Tunnel; Fannefjordtunnelen

Overview
- Location: Møre og Romsdal, Norway
- Coordinates: 62.7398°N 7.2686°E
- Route: Fv64

Operation
- Opened: 24 May 1991
- Traffic: Automotive
- Vehicles per day: 4 115 (2019)

Technical
- Length: 2,743 metres (8,999 ft)
- Min elevation: −101 metres (−331 ft)
- Grade: 10%

Fannefjord Tunnel (Norwegian: Fannefjordtunnelen) is a 2,743-meter (8,999 ft) long subsea road tunnel in Molde Municipality in Møre og Romsdal county, Norway. The tunnel is part of County Road 64 and it goes under the Fannefjorden, connecting the island of Bolsøya to the mainland at Årø, where it intersects with the European route E39 highway. The tunnel reaches a depth of −101 metres (−331 ft) in elevation with a maximum 10% grade.

The tunnel was part of the Skåla Fixed Link, which also included new roads on the island of Bolsøya and the Bolsøy Bridge from Bolsøya to Skåla Peninsula. The tunnel opened on 24 May 1991 and was partially financed as a toll road. Toll collection remained until 15 June 2005. The tunnel replaced the Molde–Bolsøy Ferry and the Lønset–Grønnes Ferry.
