= Sølsnes =

Village in Molde Municipality, Norway

- Village
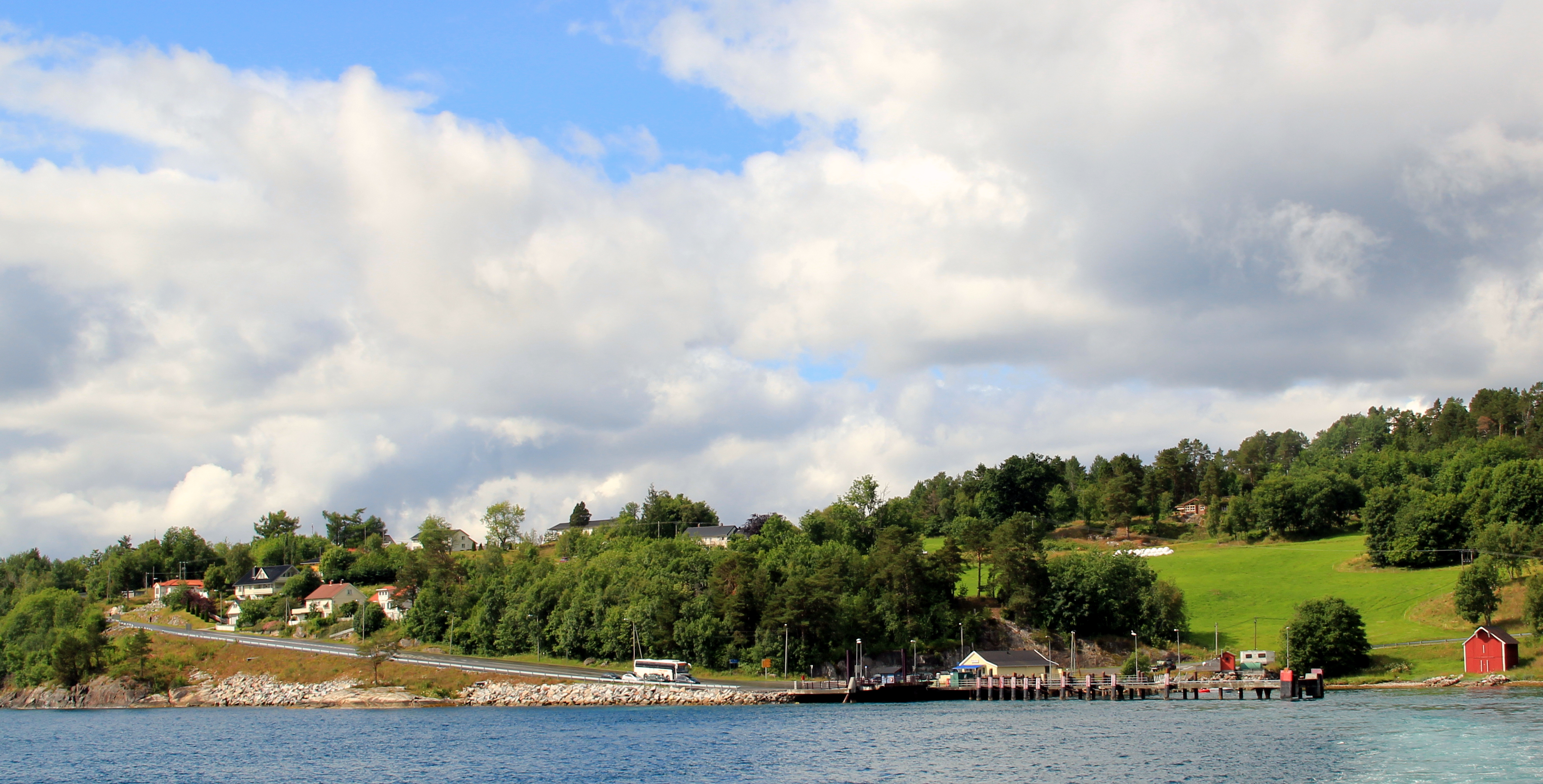
- View of the village (Photo: Chell Hill)
- Interactive map of Sølsnes
- Location within Møre og Romsdal Location within Norway
- Coordinates: 62.6856°N 7.4548°E
- Country: Norway
- Region: Western Norway
- County: Møre og Romsdal
- District: Romsdal
- Municipality: Molde Municipality
- Elevation: 34 m (112 ft)
- Time zone: UTC+01:00 (CET)
  - Summer (DST): UTC+02:00 (CEST)
- Post Code: 6456 Skåla

Sølsnes is a village in Molde Municipality in Møre og Romsdal county, Norway. The village is located on the Romsdal Peninsula at the confluence of the Karlsøyfjorden and the Langfjorden. The village of Nesjestranda lies about 2.5 kilometres (1.6 mi) north of Sølsnes. The Old Veøy Church is located on the island of Veøya, off the coast from Sølsnes. That church is now a museum and it was replaced in 1907 by a new Veøy Church which was built in Sølsnes.

The Norwegian County Road 64 runs through the village to a ferry quay on the south side of the village. The ferry crosses the Langfjorden to the south and connects to the village of Åfarnes in Rauma Municipality. The proposed Langfjord Tunnel would have its northern entrance near Sølsnes, replacing the Sølsnes-Åfarnes ferry.
