= Åfarnes =

Village in Rauma Municipality, Norway

- Village
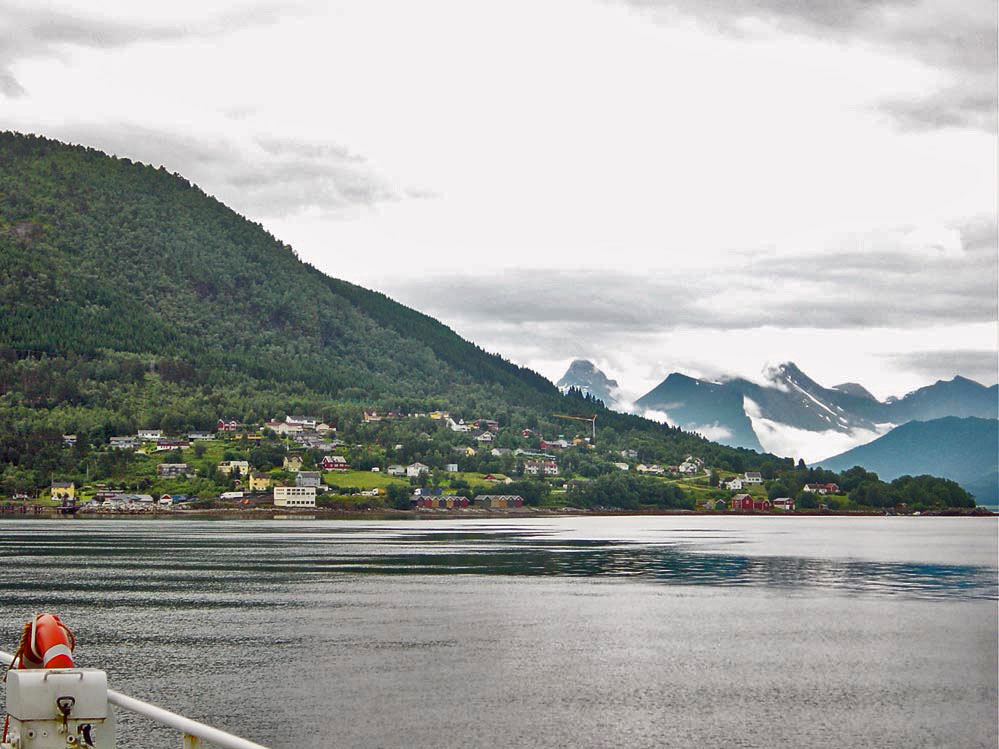
- View of the village
- Interactive map of Åfarnes
- Location within Møre og Romsdal Location within Norway
- Coordinates: 62.6616°N 7.5013°E
- Country: Norway
- Region: Western Norway
- County: Møre og Romsdal
- District: Romsdal
- Municipality: Rauma Municipality
- Elevation: 14 m (46 ft)
- Time zone: UTC+01:00 (CET)
  - Summer (DST): UTC+02:00 (CEST)
- Post Code: 6360 Åfarnes

Åfarnes (historically, Aafarnes) is a village in Rauma Municipality in Møre og Romsdal county, Norway. The village is located at the confluence of the three fjords: Romsdal Fjord, Langfjorden, and Rødvenfjorden. The local Church of Norway parish is based at Holm Church, located about 4 kilometres (2.5 mi) east of the village.

The Norwegian County Road 64 runs through the village on its way from the town of Åndalsnes (to the south) and the town of Molde (to the north). There is a ferry quay in Åfarnes with regular ferries across the Langfjorden to the village of Sølsnes in Molde Municipality to the north. The proposed Langfjord Tunnel would connect Åfarnes and Sølsnes as part of County Road 64.
