= Holm Church =

Church in Møre og Romsdal, Norway

- Holm kyrkje
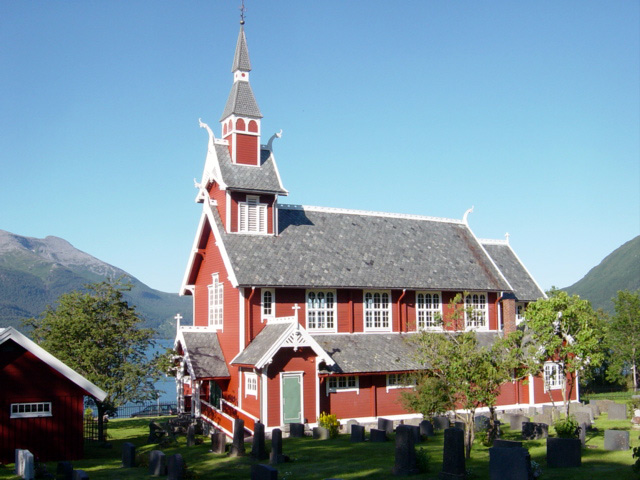
- View of the church
- Holm Church
- 62°40′37″N 7°34′05″E
- Location: Rauma Municipality, Møre og Romsdal
- Country: Norway
- Denomination: Church of Norway
- Churchmanship: Evangelical Lutheran

History
- Status: Parish church
- Founded: 1907
- Consecrated: 1907

Architecture
- Functional status: Active
- Architect: Karl Norum
- Architectural type: Long church
- Style: Dragestil
- Completed: 1907 (119 years ago)

Specifications
- Capacity: 220
- Materials: Wood

Administration
- Diocese: Møre bispedømme
- Deanery: Indre Romsdal prosti
- Parish: Eid og Holm
- Norwegian Cultural Heritage Site
- Type: Church
- Status: Not protected
- ID: 84600

Holm Church (Norwegian: Holm kyrkje) is a parish church of the Church of Norway in Rauma Municipality in Møre og Romsdal county, Norway. It is located in the village of Holm, about halfway between the villages of Åfarnes and Mittet. It is one of the churches for the Eid og Holm parish which is part of the Indre Romsdal prosti (deanery) in the Diocese of Møre. The red, wooden church was built in a long church design and in the dragestil style in 1907 using plans drawn up by the architect Karl Norum. The church seats about 220 people.

== History ==
The people of the Holm area were part of the Old Veøy Church parish for centuries. On 14 May 1901, a royal resolution separated it out as its own parish. Soon after, plans were made to build a new, large church in Holm. Karl Norum was hired to design the new church. It was manufactured and partially built in a factory setting and then its parts were somewhat disassembled and shipped to the building site.

== Media gallery ==
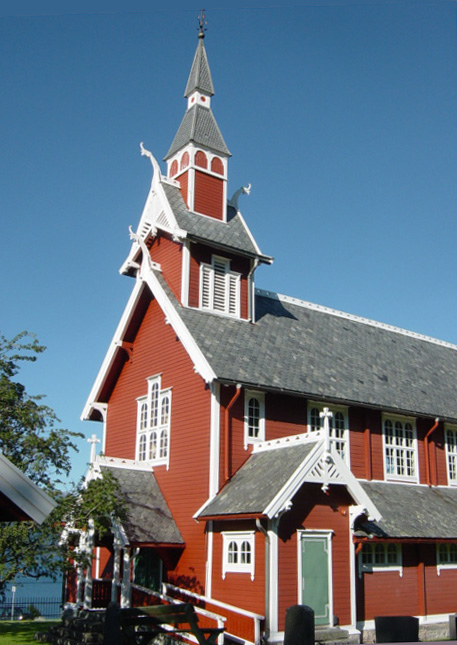
Exterior front

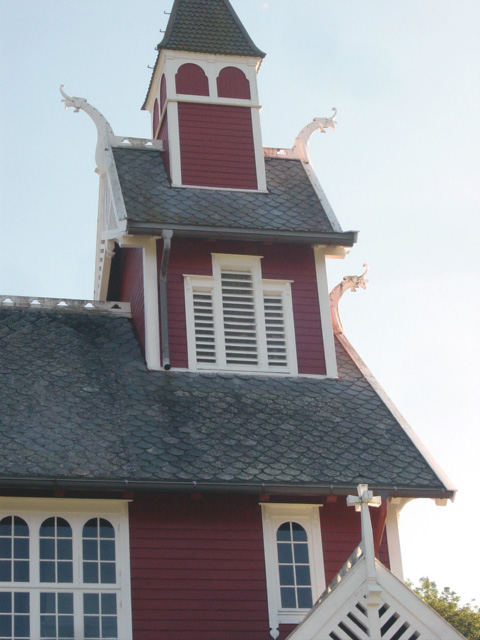
Close up of steeple

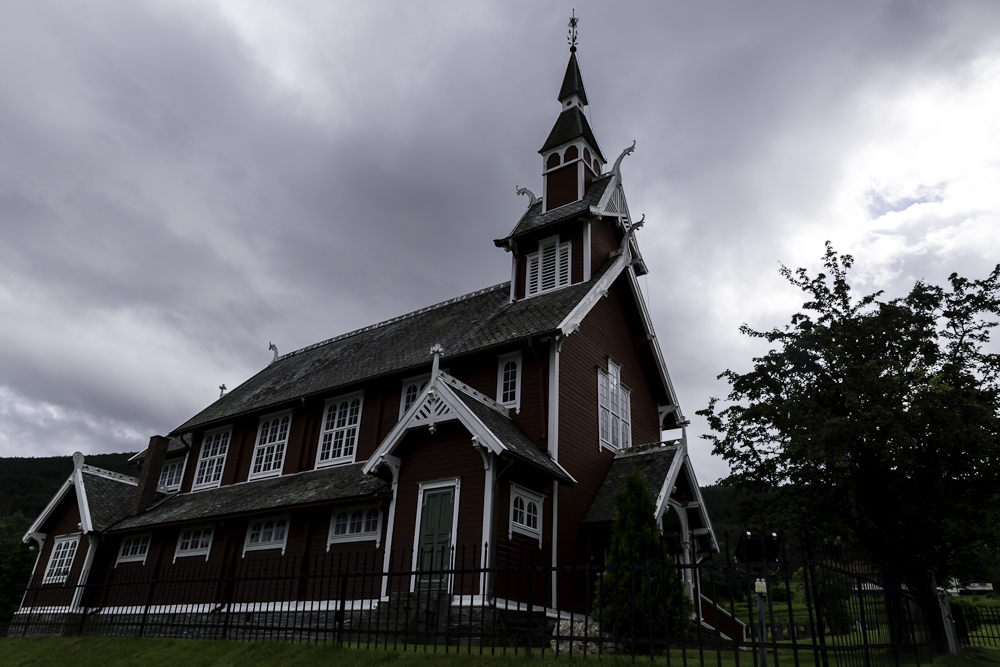
Alternate exterior view

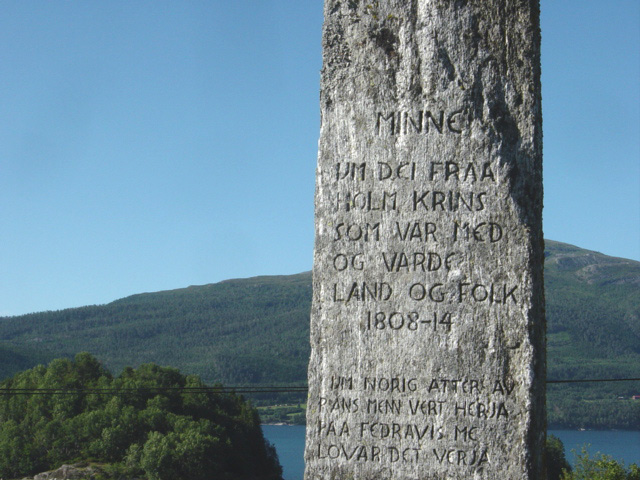
War memorial at the church

== See also ==
- List of churches in Møre
