= Karl Norum =

Norwegian architect

Karl Martin Norum
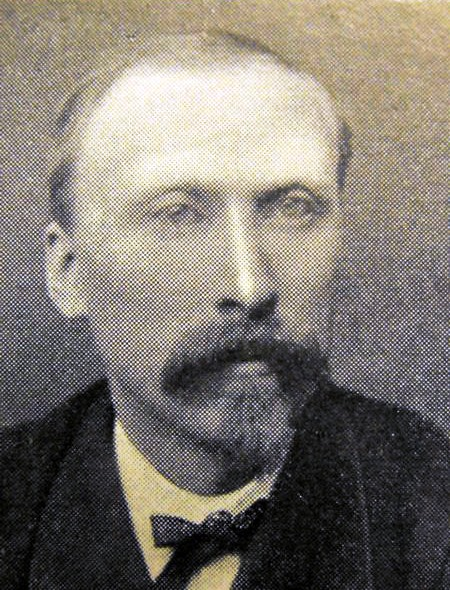
- Born: 16 February 1852; Levanger, Norway
- Died: 9 October 1911 (aged 59); Trondheim, Norway
- Occupation: Architect
- Spouse: Anna Othilie Gotaas
- Parent(s): Magnus Christoffersen and Karen Pedersdatter

Karl Martin Norum (1852—1911) was a Norwegian architect, best known for his many church buildings, as well as contributions to the reconstruction after the fire in the city of Ålesund in 1904. Norum is well known for his Art Nouveau and Dragestil designs.

Norum was born in 1852 in Levanger, Norway. He was educated at the Trondheim Technical College from 1872 to 1875. From 1875 to 1880, he worked for the Rørosbanen railway line as a surveyor during the construction of the railway line. In 1880, he was hired as a draftsman for the architectural firm of Jakob Digre in Trondheim. In 1884, he was hired as an assistant in the engineering office for the city of Trondheim.

In 1886, he was hired as the chief architect and designer for the architectural firm of Jakob Digre, where he worked earlier in his career. The firm had several architects and Norum worked here for 25 years. During this time, Norum was known for the dragestil style of many of the church buildings he designed such as Stangvik Church (1896), Frei Church (1897), Sortland Church (1901), Steinkjer Church (1902), Neiden Church (1902), Levanger Church (1902), Namsos Church (1903), Buksnes Church (1905), Veøy Church (1907), Holm Church (1907). He was also involved in the renovation of the Hammerfest Church in 1892.

In Trondheim, Norum was also the designer of a number of public and industrial buildings such as the Britannia Hotel (1895), Mathesongården (1898), Hjorten Revue and Variety Theater restaurant (1899), the Bødtker family's villa Kvernbekken (1902), the local Masonic Lodge, Trondheim hospital on Øya (1902), the main post office (1911), and Tollboden (1911). Most were in designed in an Art Nouveau and built out of stone.

While working in Ålesund (1904–1907) to rebuild after a city-wide fire, he was the architect of almost ten buildings, perhaps the most famous being the 2.94-metre (9 ft 8 in) wide apartment building (located at Kongens gt. 10B) which is the country's narrowest apartment building. He also designed the commercial building "Carl E. Rønneberg & Sønner" on Noteneset.

== Media gallery ==
Buildings designed by Norum

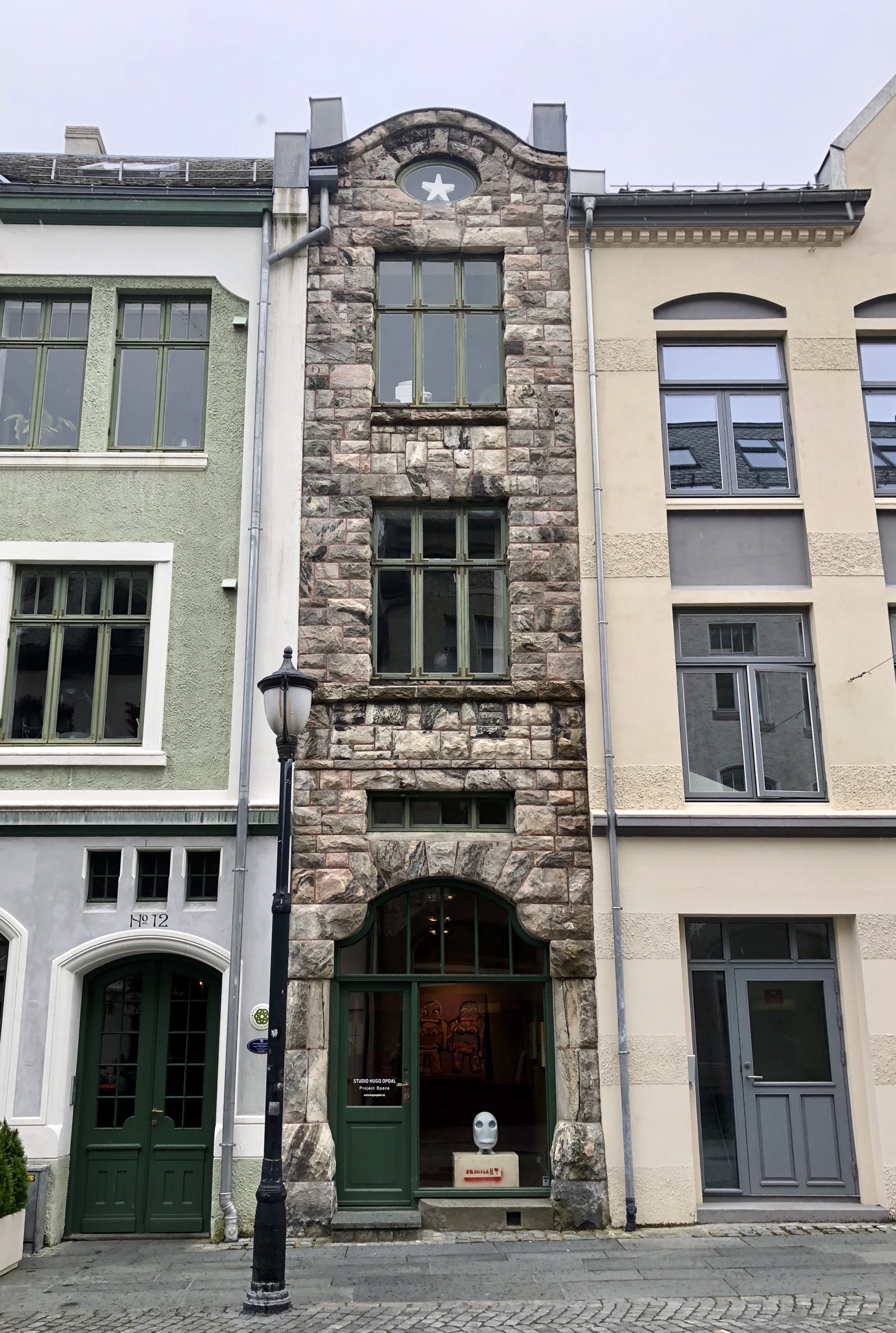
Narrow building in the town of Ålesund

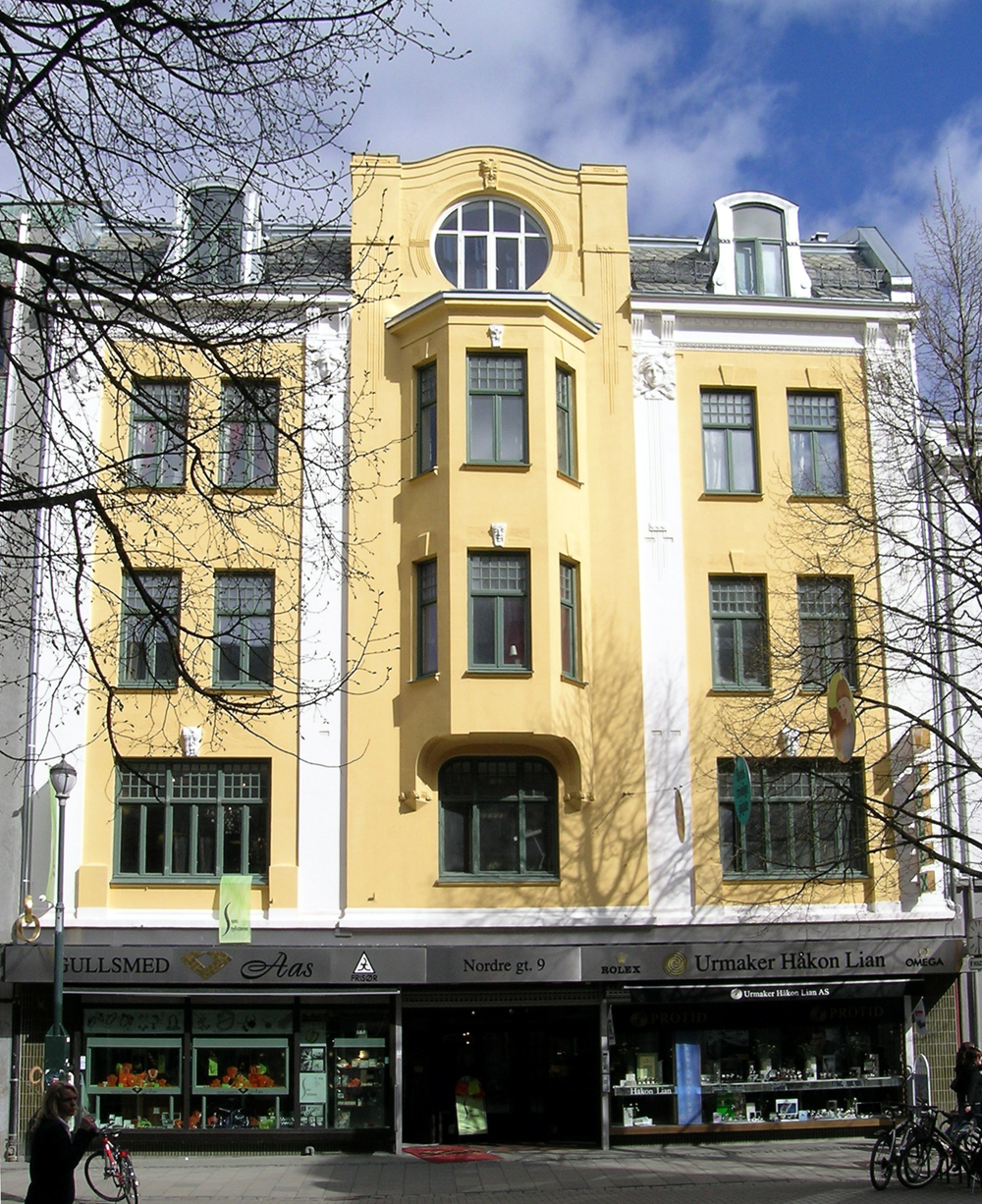
Nordre gate 9 in the city of Trondheim

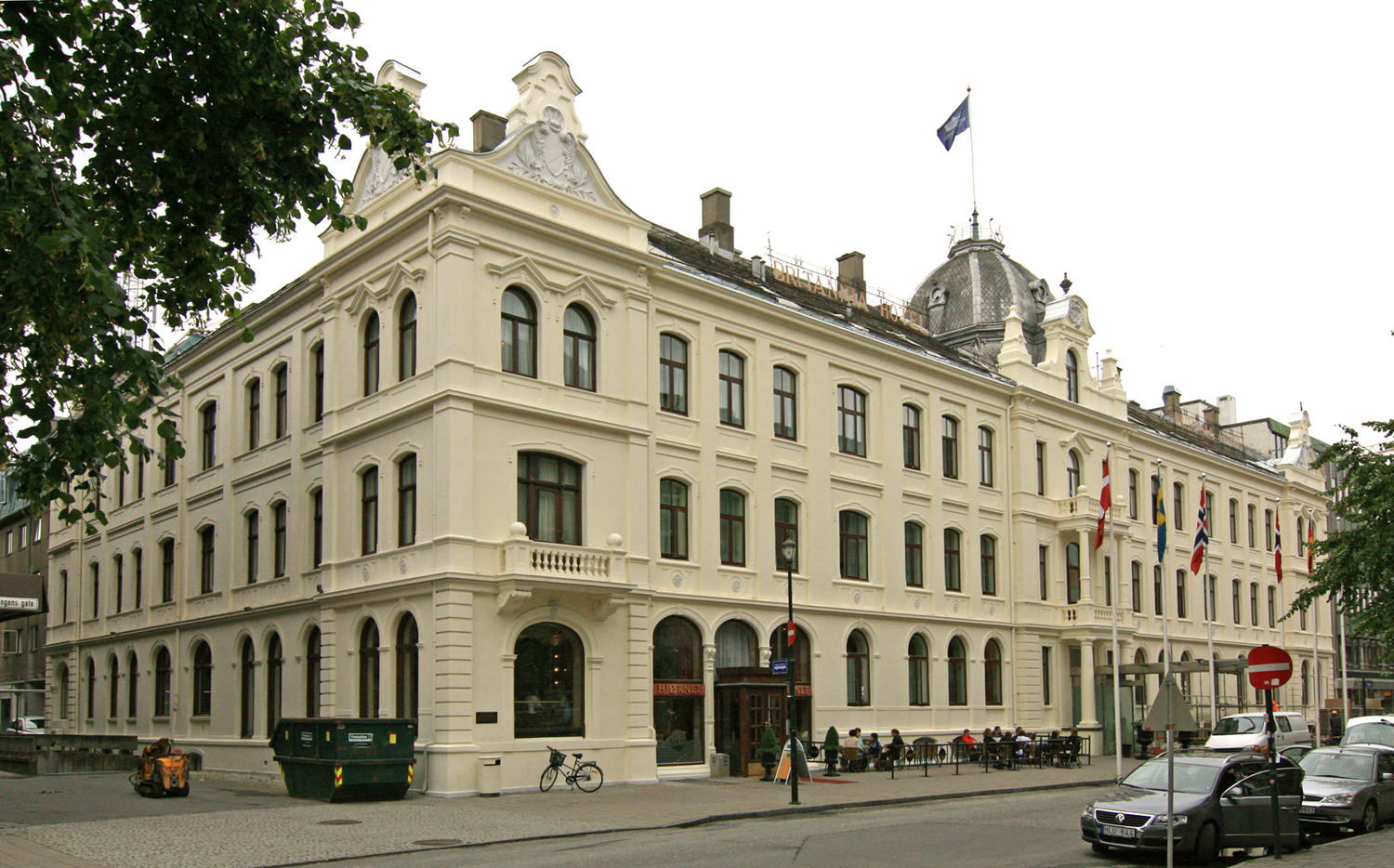
Britannia Hotel in Trondheim

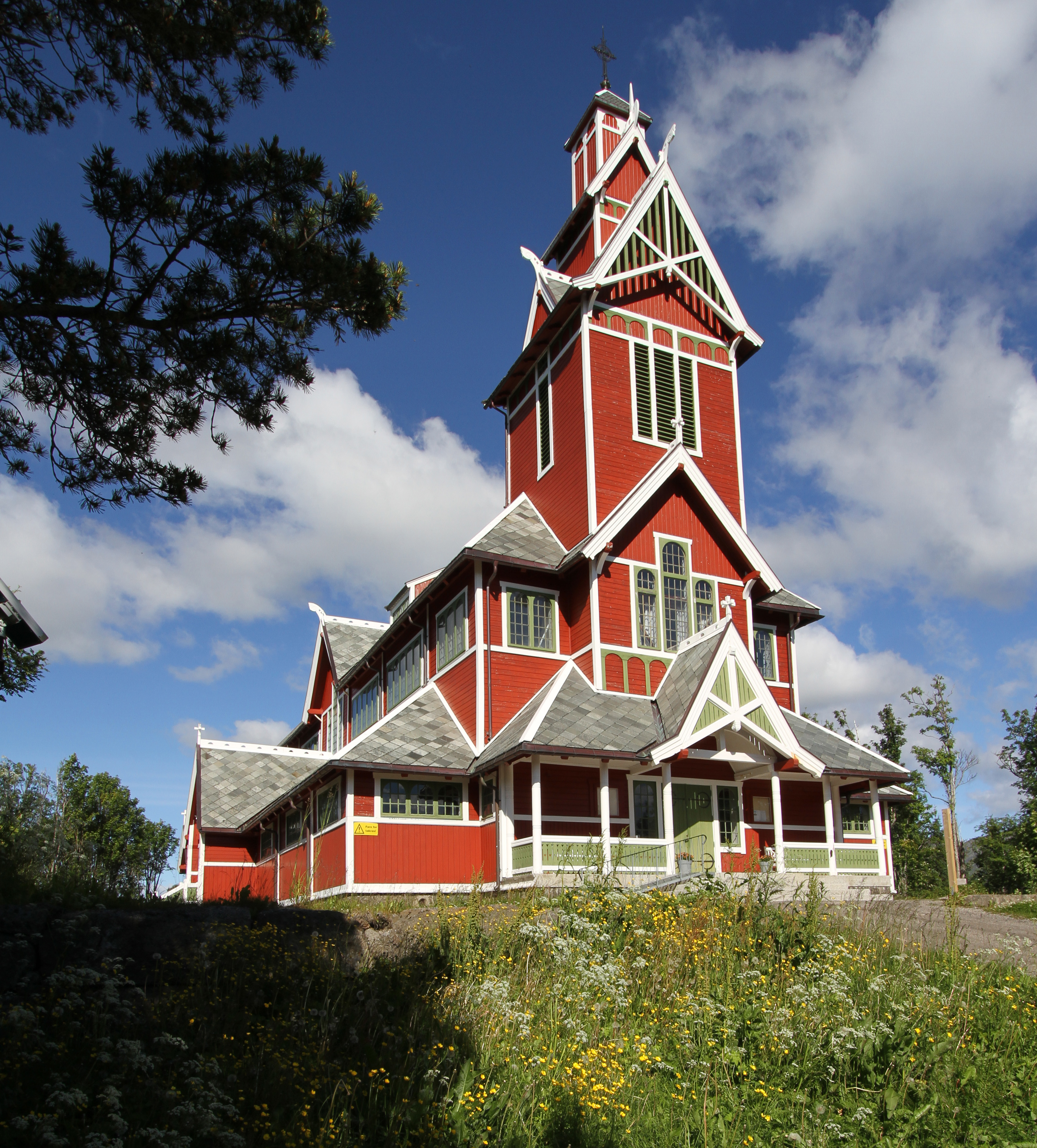
Buksnes Church in Vestvågøy Municipality

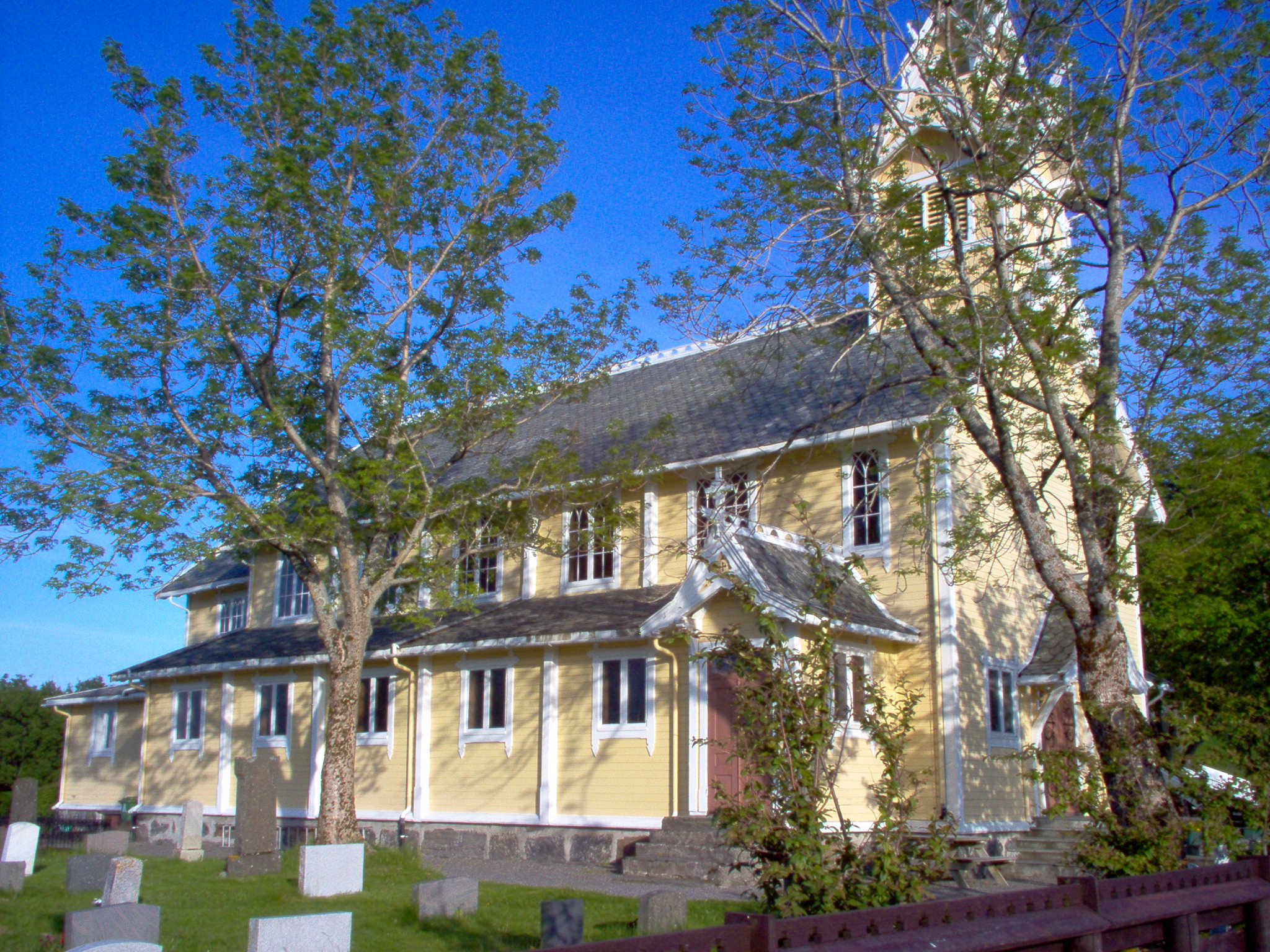
Frei Church in Kristiansund Municipality

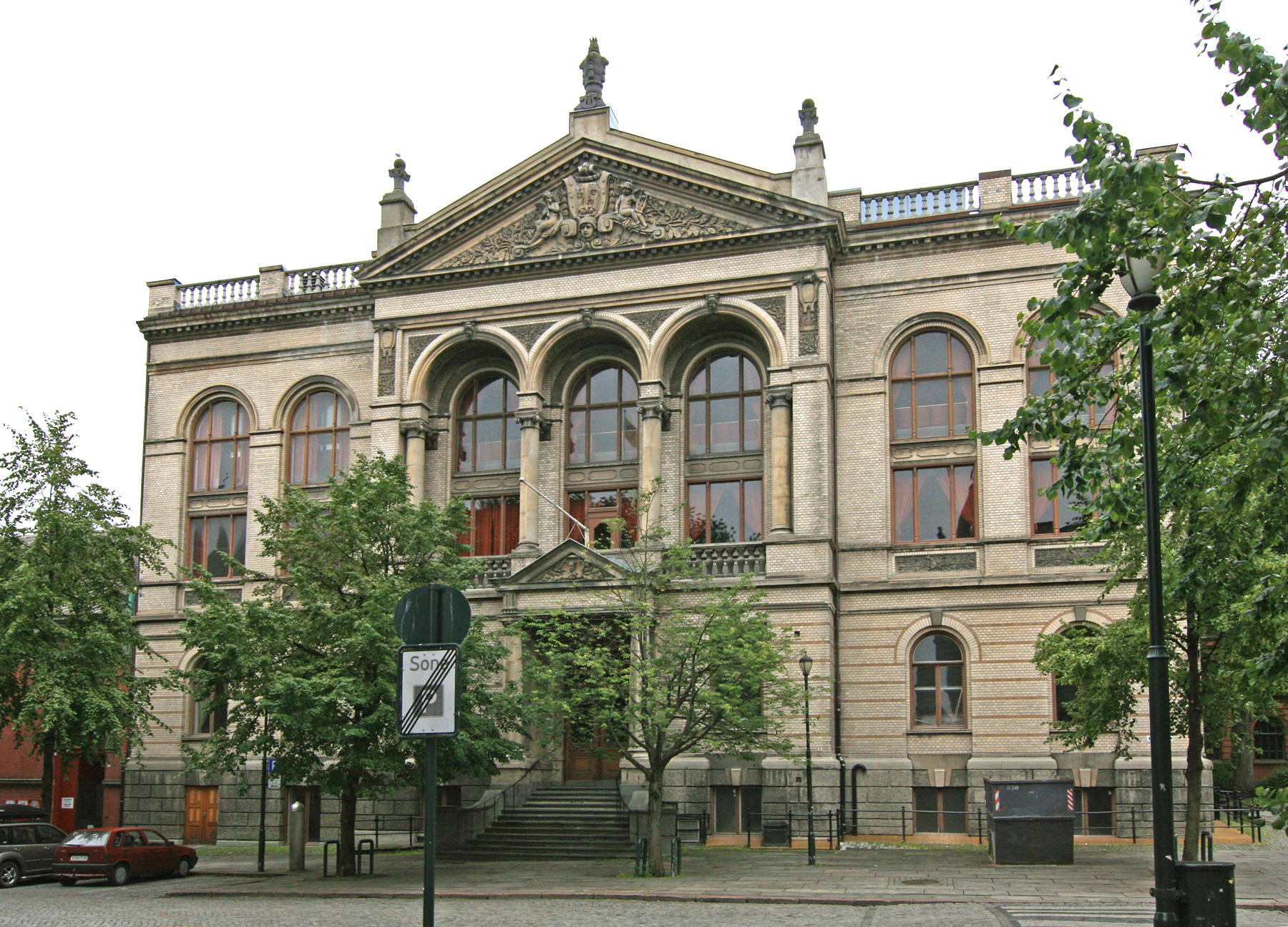
Trondheim Masonic Lodge

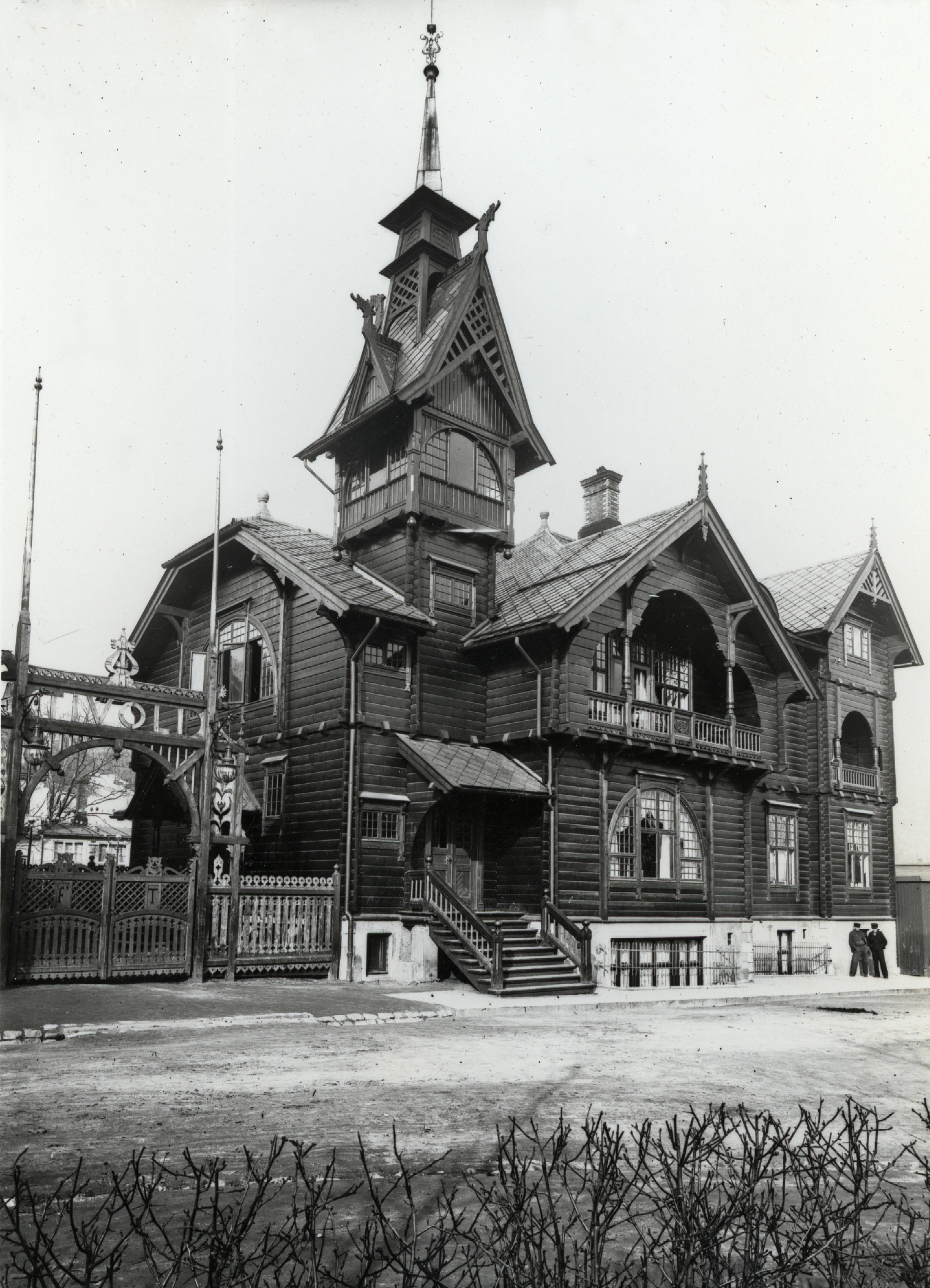
Hjorten Revue and Variety theatre

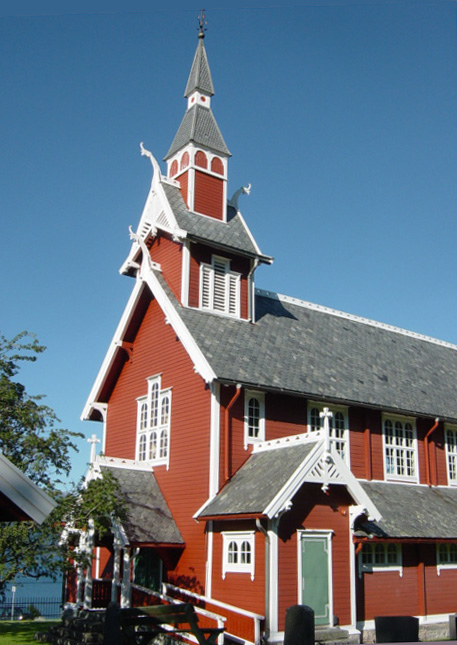
Holm Church in Rauma Municipality

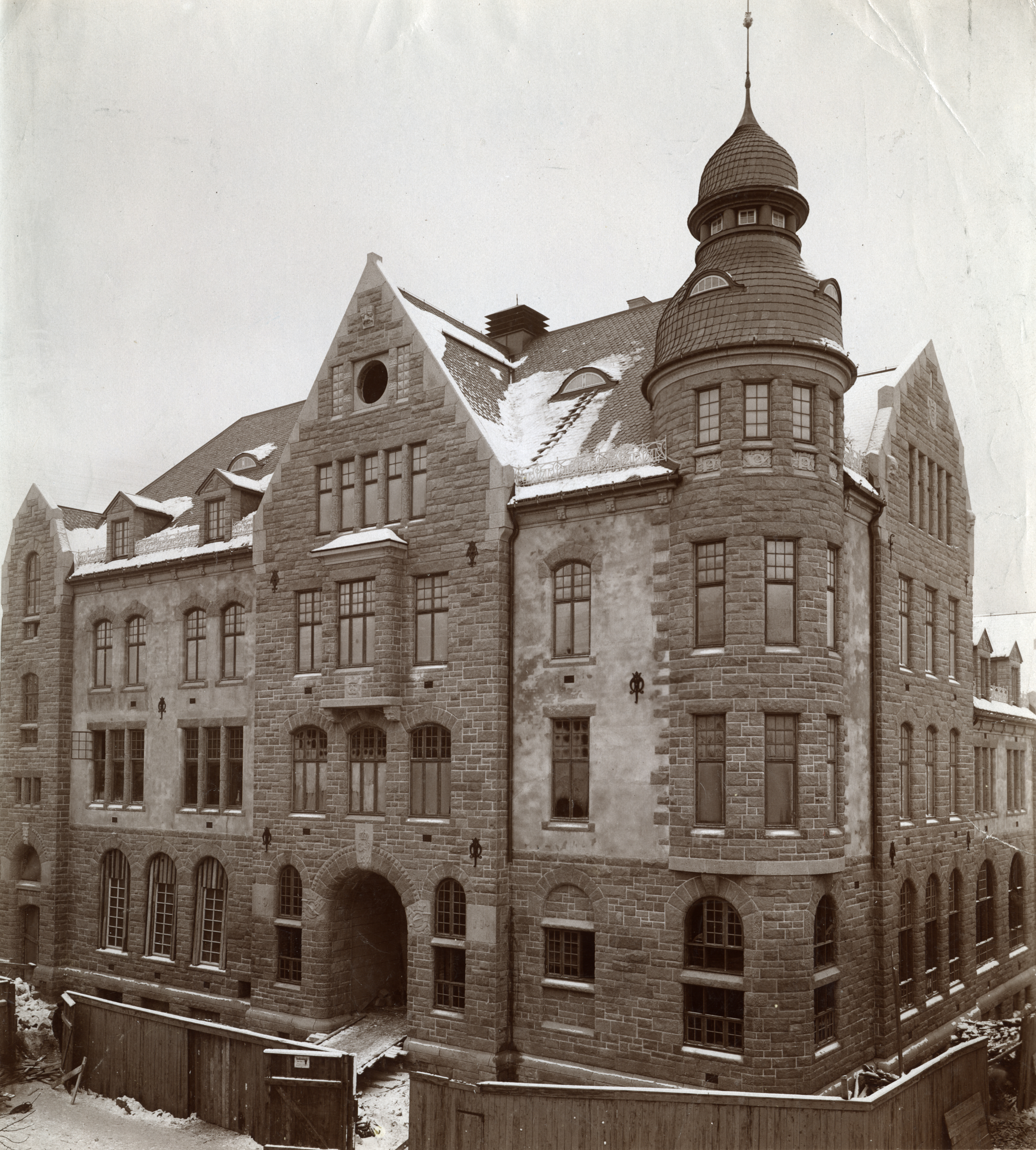
Main post office in Trondheim

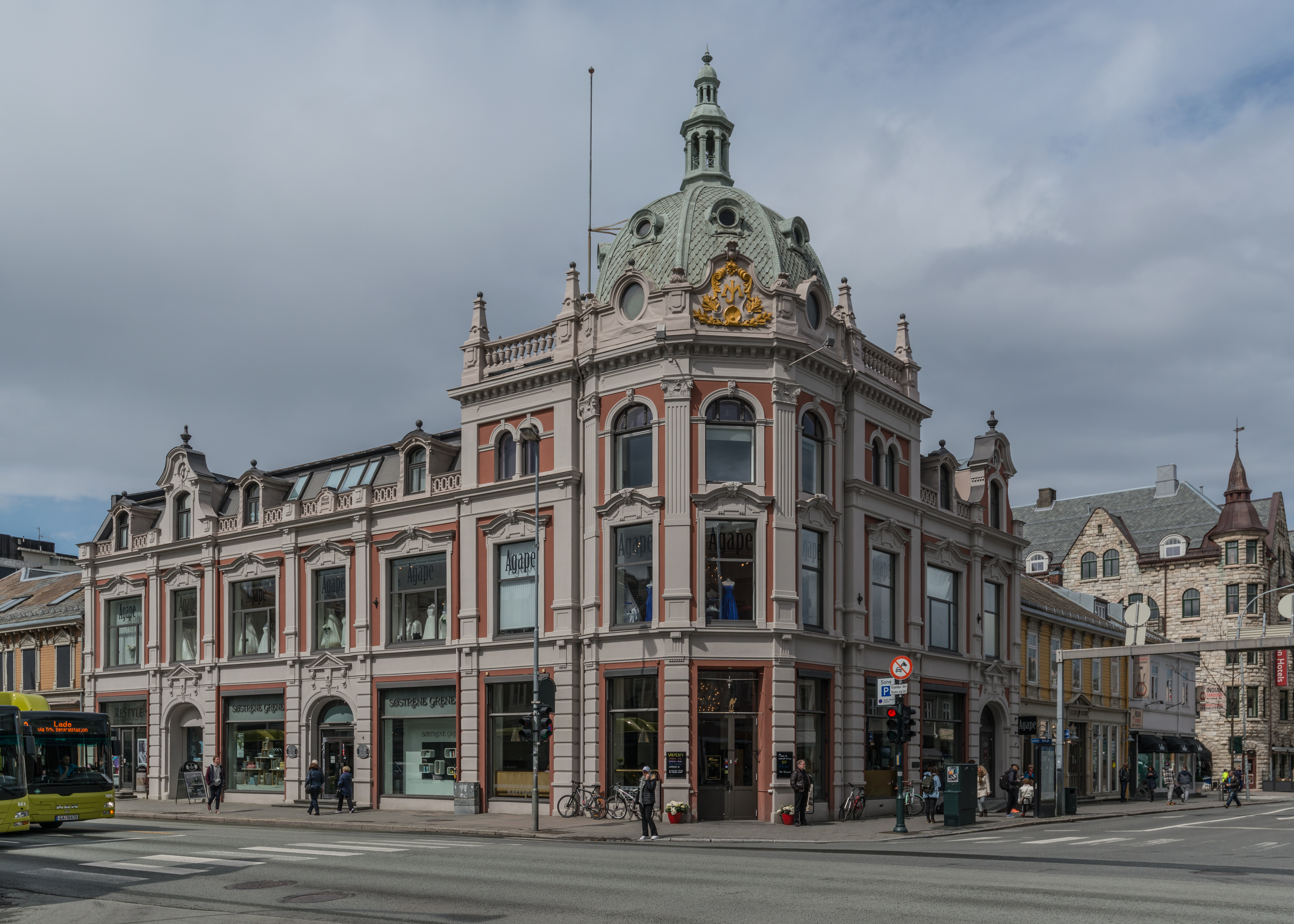
Mathesongården building in Trondheim

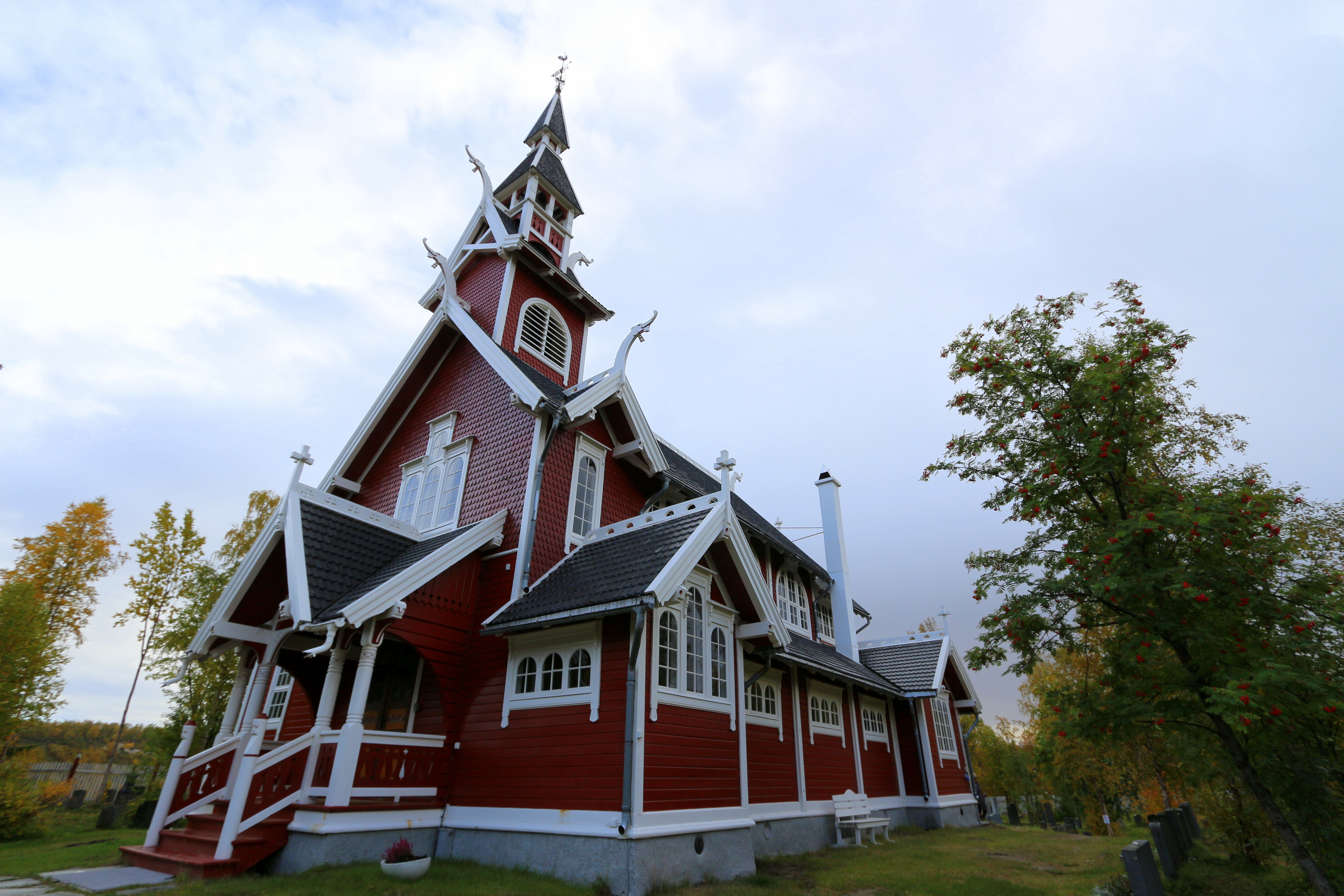
Neiden Church in Sør-Varanger Municipality

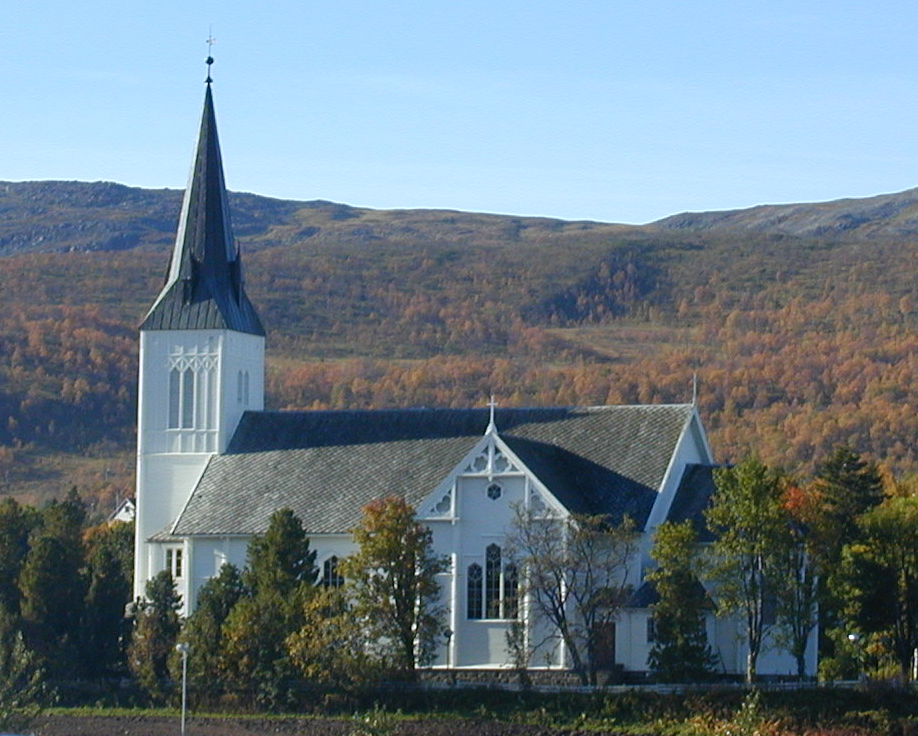
Sortland Church in Sortland Municipality

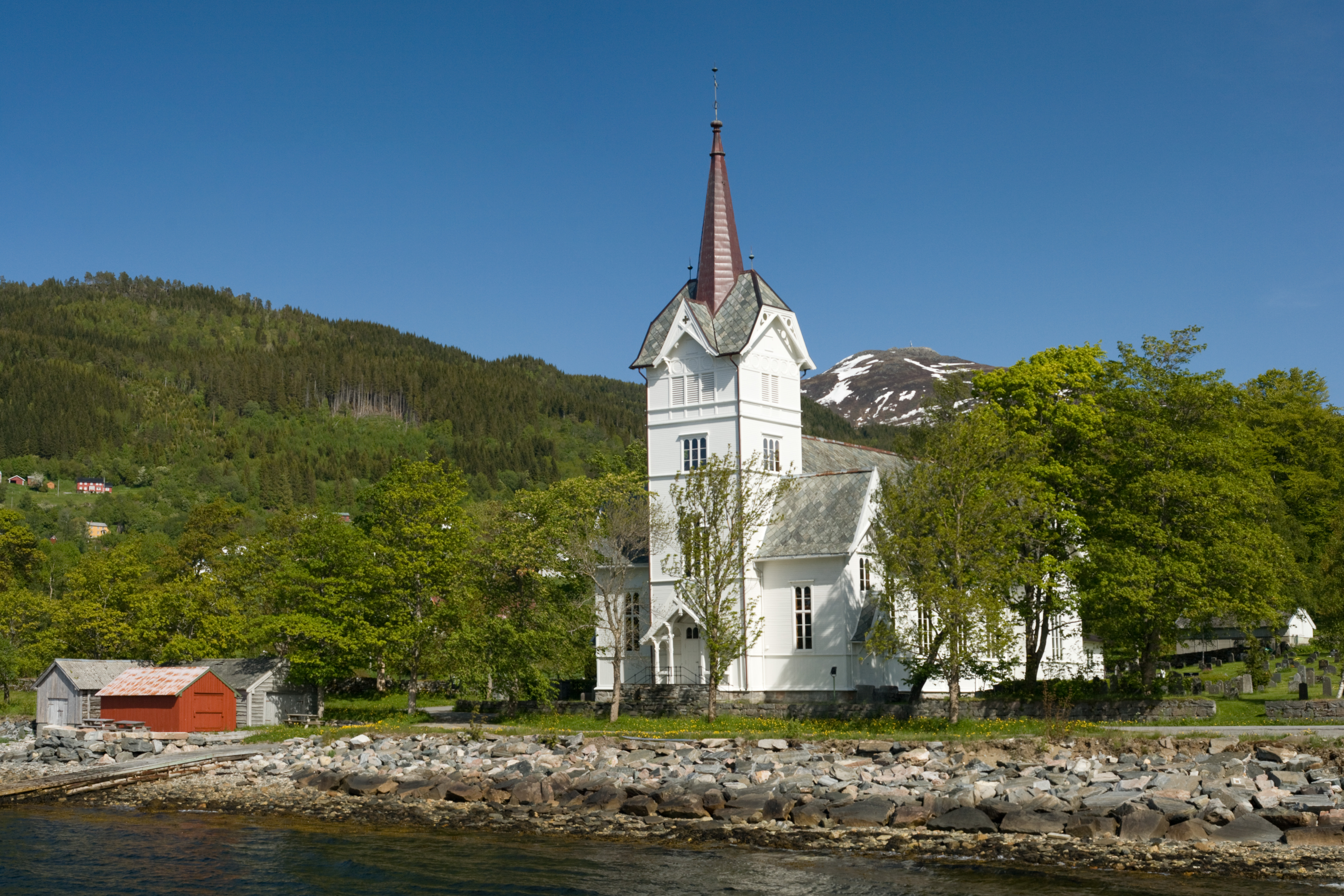
Stangvik Church in Surnadal Municipality

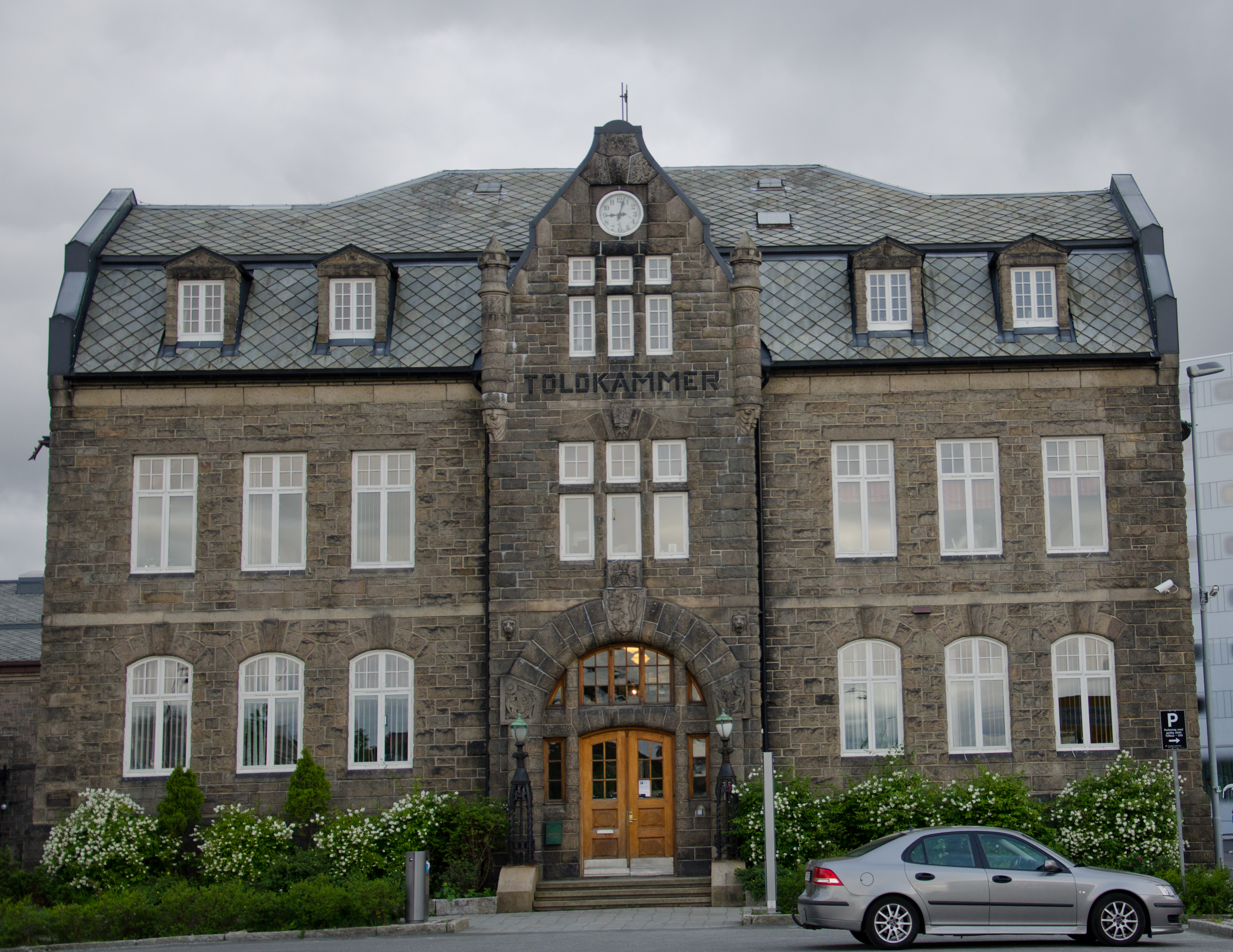
Tollboden building in Trondheim

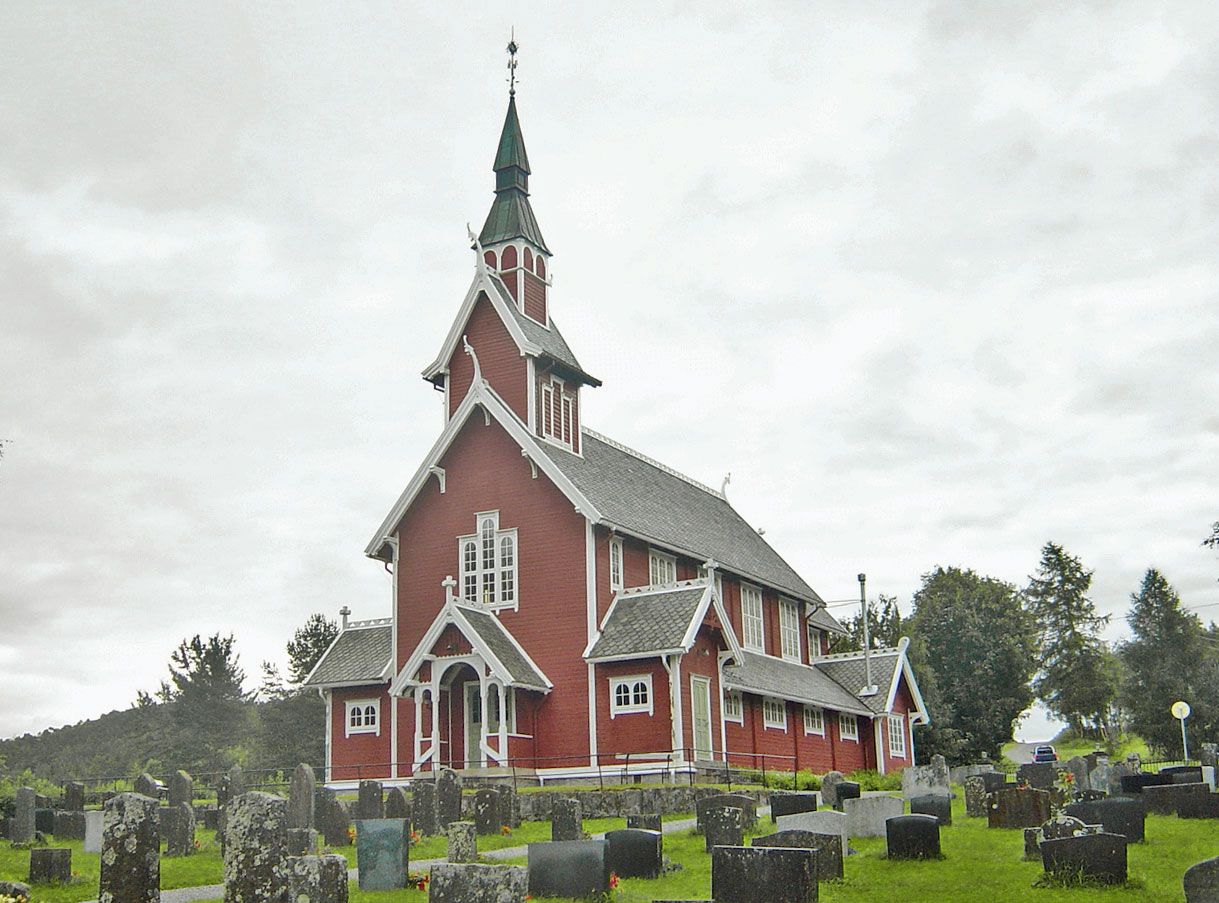
Veøy Church in Molde Municipality
