= Neiden Chapel =

- Neiden kapell
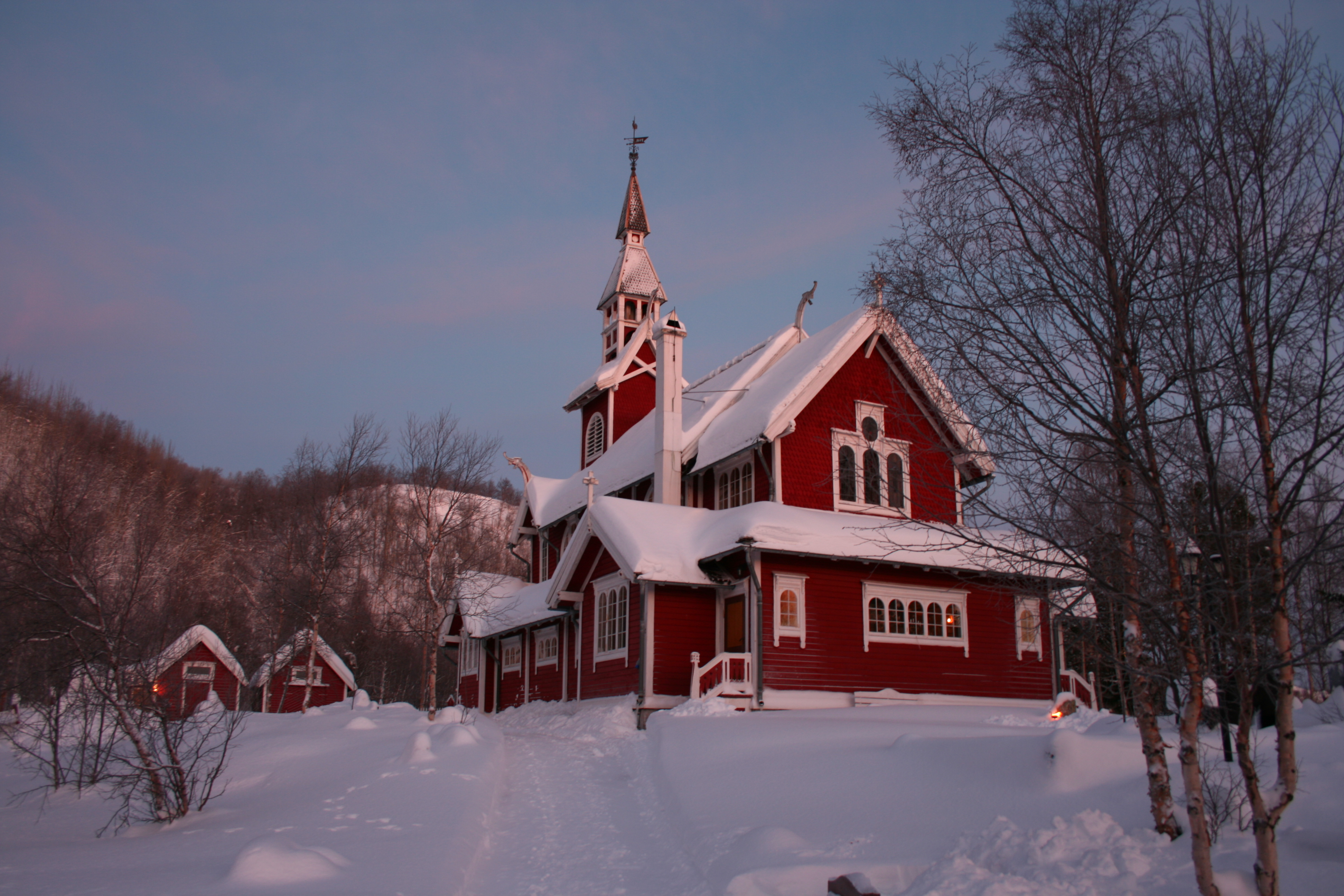
- View of the church
- Neiden Chapel
- 69.7019°N 29.3884°E
- Location: Sør-Varanger, Finnmark
- Country: Norway
- Denomination: Church of Norway
- Churchmanship: Evangelical Lutheran

History
- Status: Parish church
- Founded: 1902
- Consecrated: 13 July 1902

Architecture
- Functional status: Active
- Architect: Karl Norum
- Architectural type: Long church
- Style: Dragestil
- Completed: 1902 (124 years ago)

Specifications
- Capacity: 155
- Materials: Wood

Administration
- Diocese: Nord-Hålogaland
- Deanery: Varanger prosti
- Parish: Sør-Varanger
- Norwegian Cultural Heritage Site
- Type: Church
- Status: Listed
- ID: 85100

Neiden Chapel (Norwegian: Neiden kapell) is a parish church of the Church of Norway in Sør-Varanger Municipality in Finnmark county, Norway. It is located in the village of Neiden. It is one of the churches for the Sør-Varanger parish which is part of the Varanger prosti (deanery) in the Diocese of Nord-Hålogaland. The red and white, wooden church was built in a long church format in the style called dragestil in 1902 by the architect Karl Norum. The church seats about 155 people.

== History ==
In 1898, many farmers in Neiden made a request to the Ministry of Church and Education to have a church and a cemetery built in Neiden. Only four years later, the church was finished. The residents' desire to have a church coincided with the government's desire to secure the border from Finnish-Russian expansion, and a Norwegian church near the border would help. Architect Karl Norum was very keen on old Norwegian stave churches, and he created a dragestil building that would be an expression of Norwegian culture and national cohesion in a border area. The chapel had 155 seats and it cost 32,900 kr at that time. The chapel was consecrated on 13 July 1902.

=== Russian Orthodox chapel ===
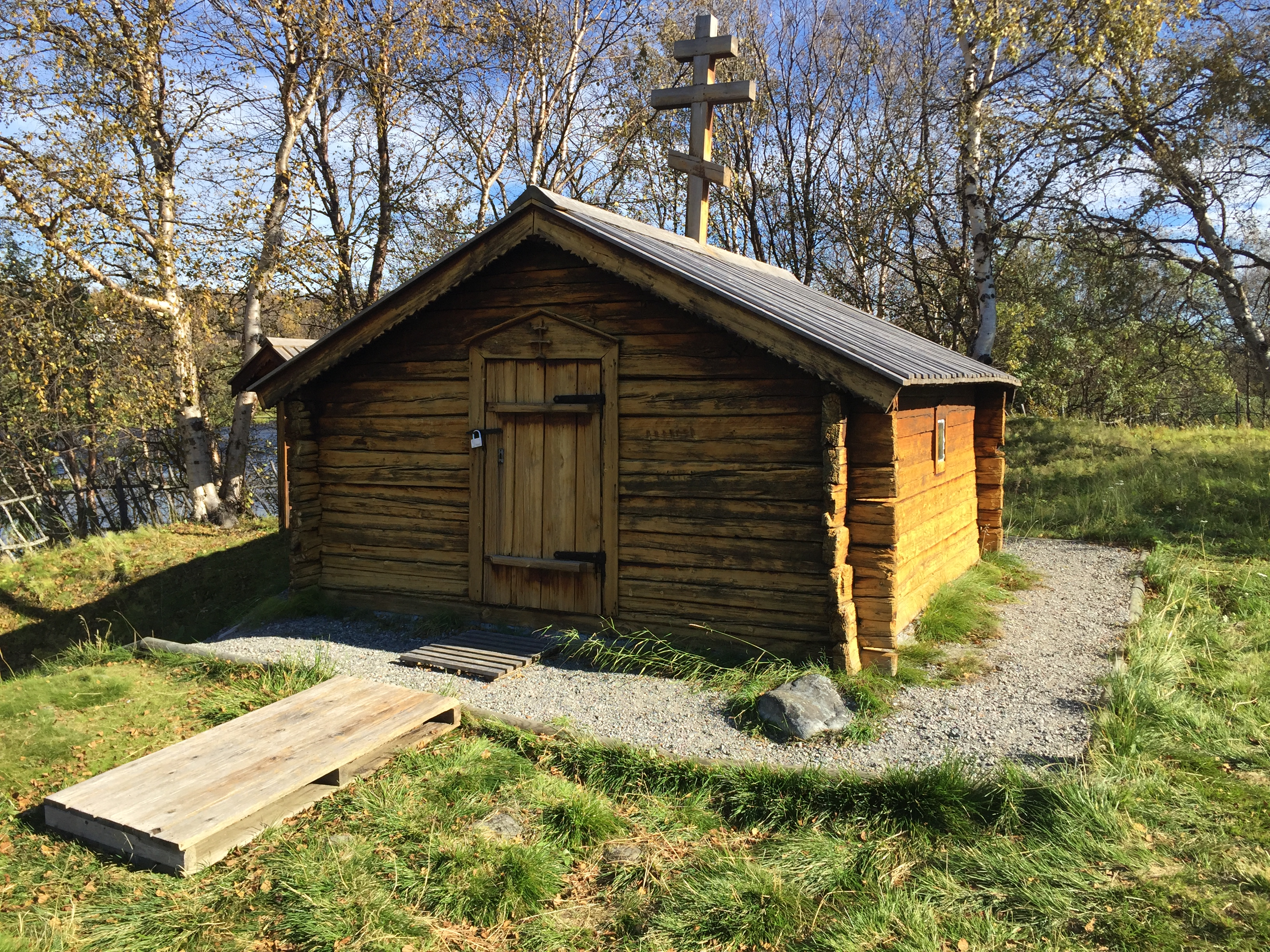
The Russian Saint George chapel

There is also a Russian Orthodox chapel located nearby in Neiden, built in the 16th century as a part of Russian Christianisation of the Skolt samis who were the inhabitants of the area at that time.

== Media gallery ==
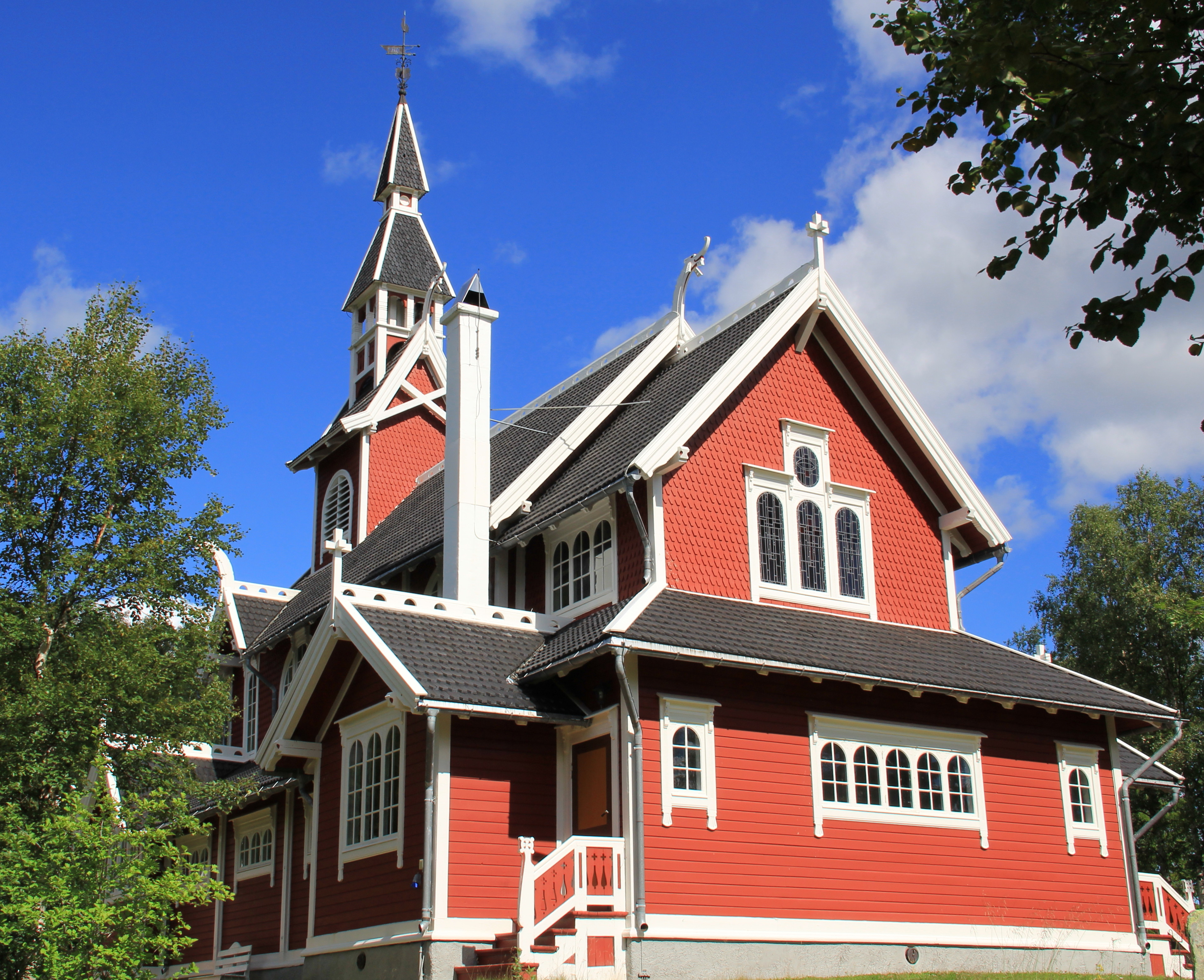

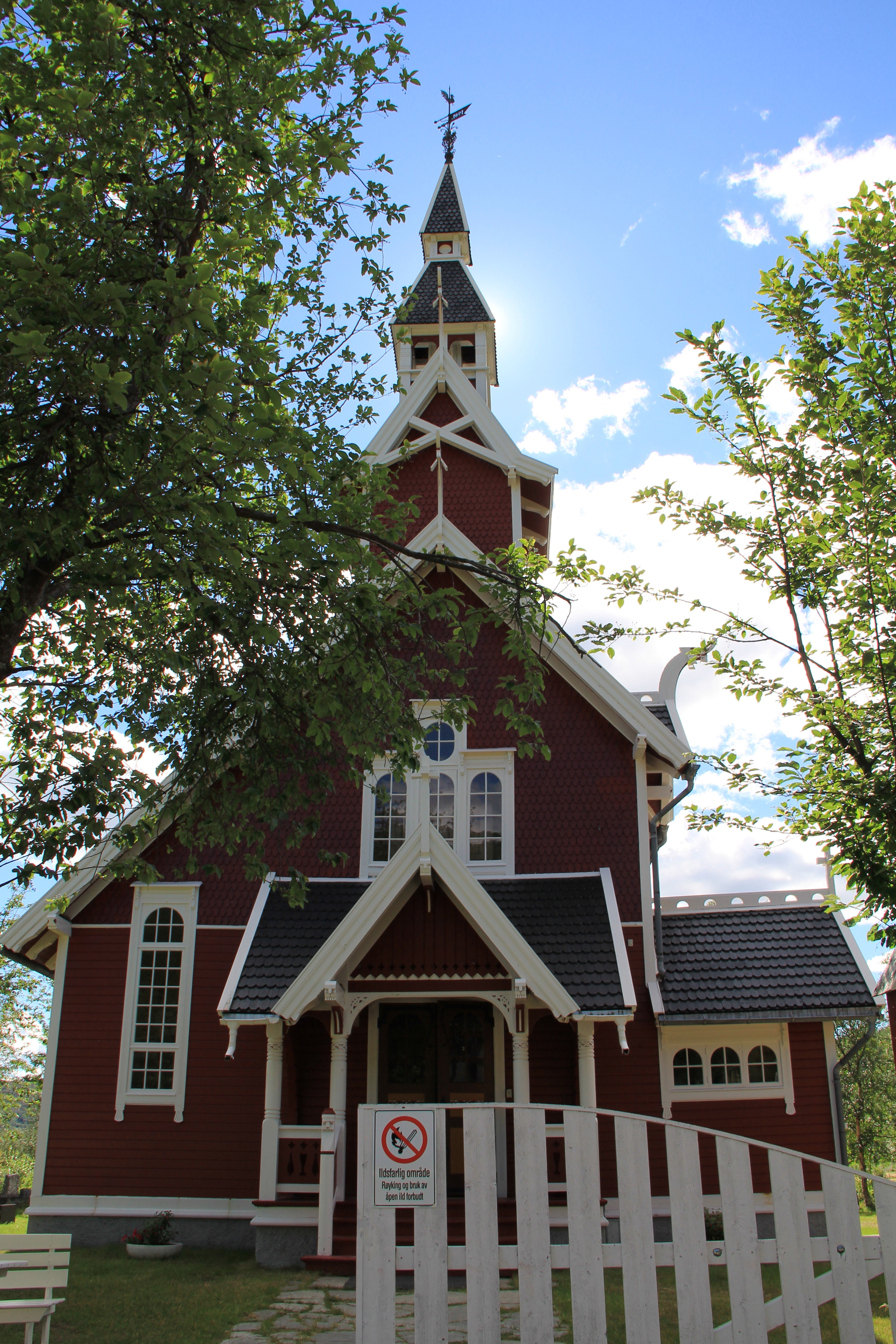

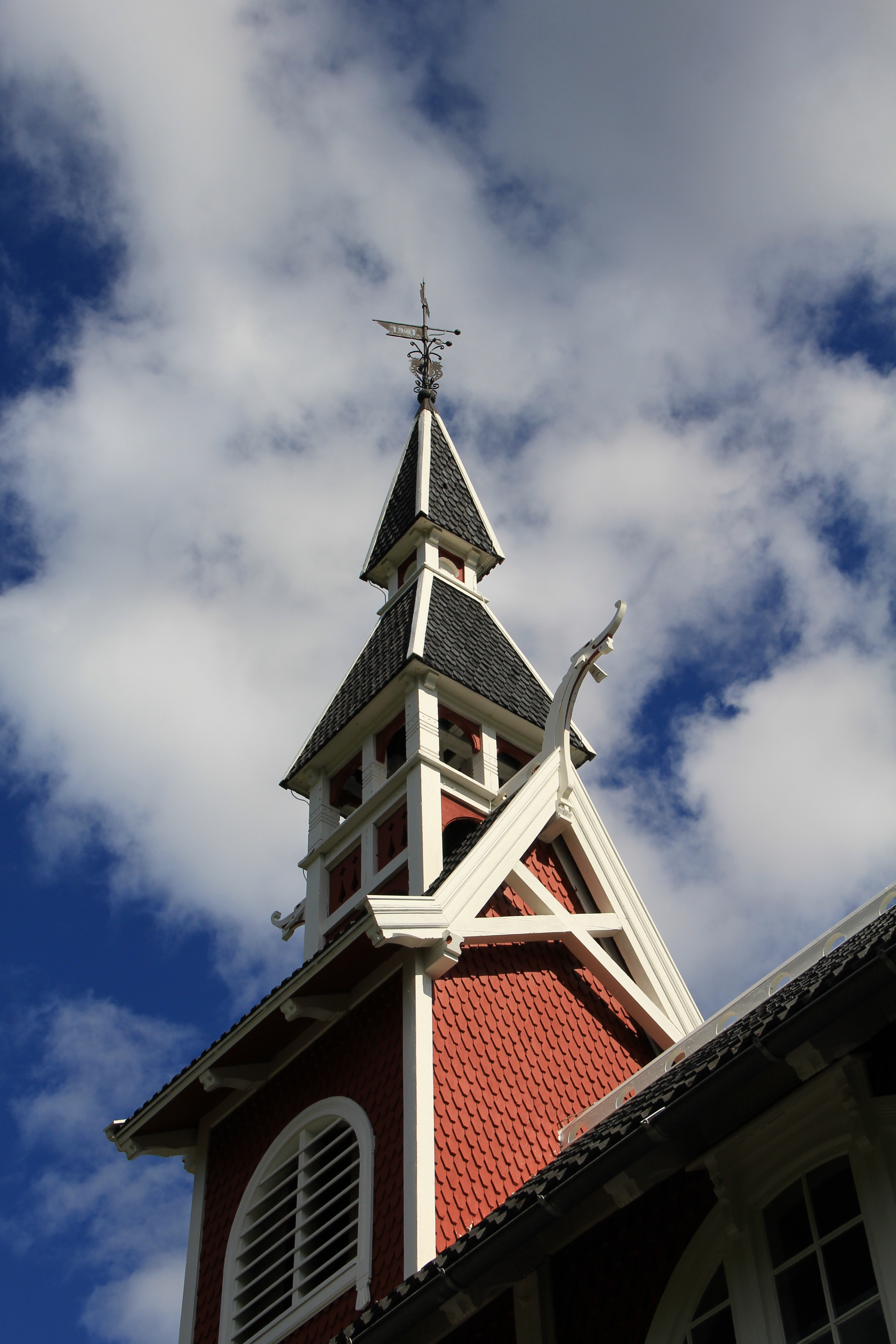

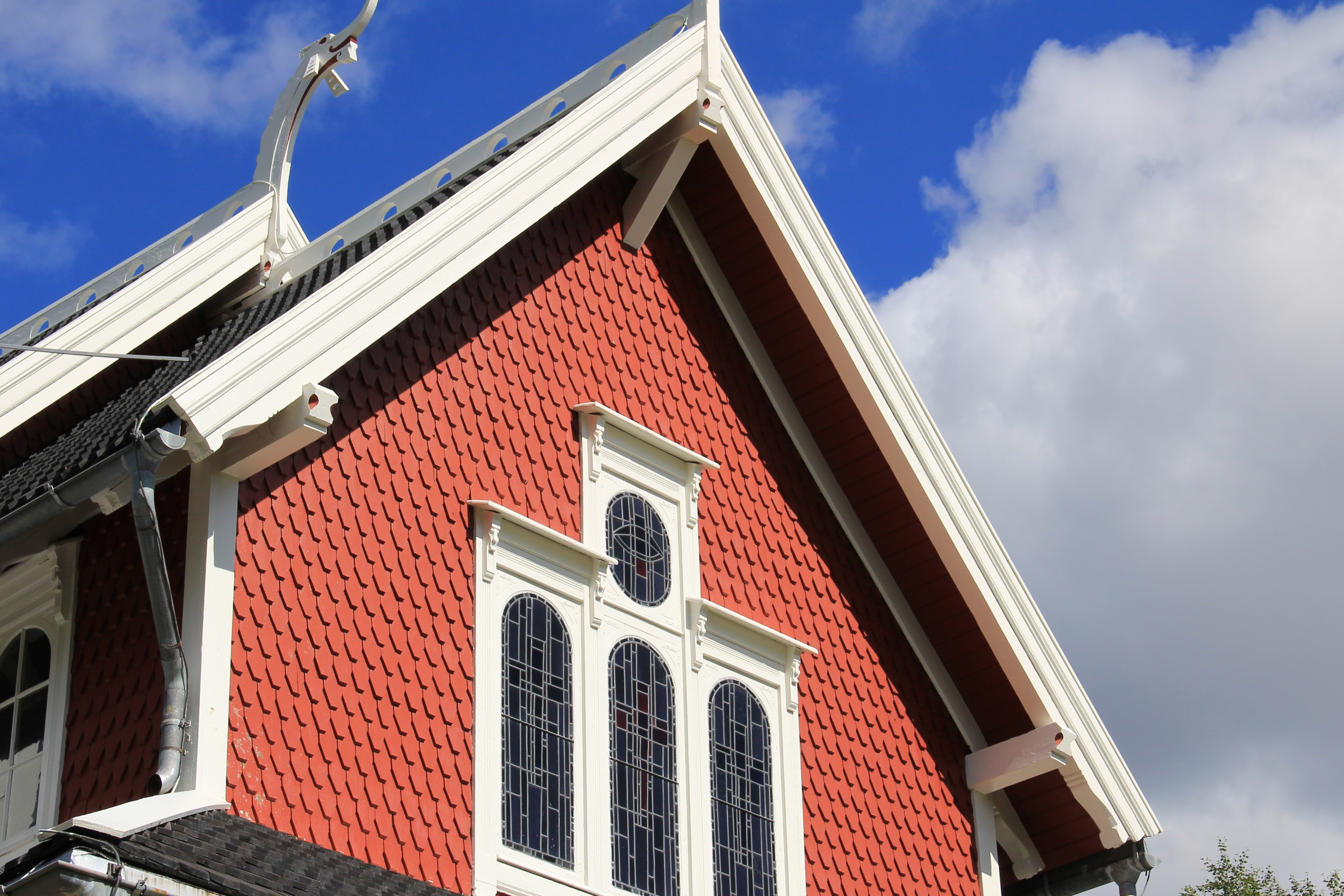

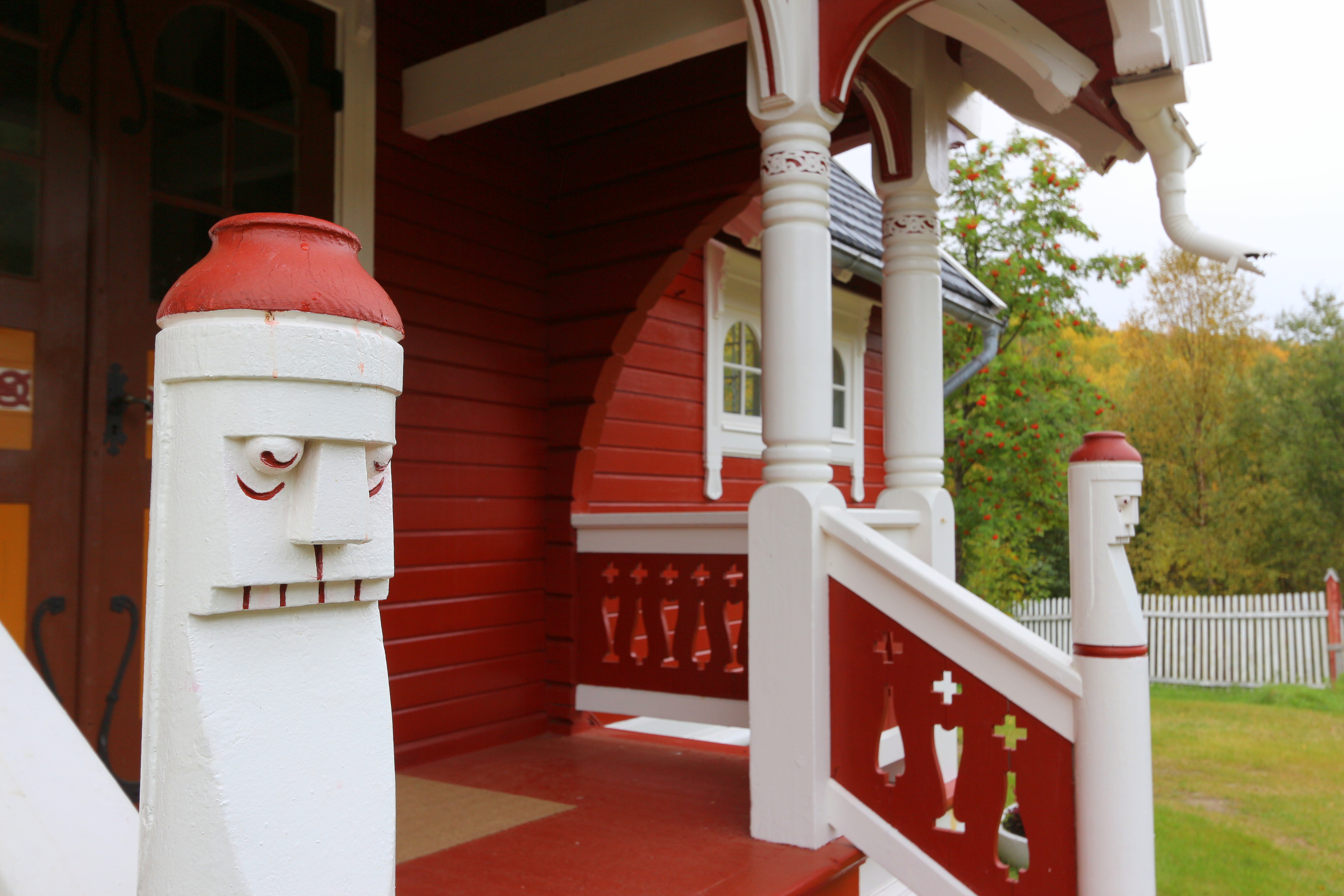

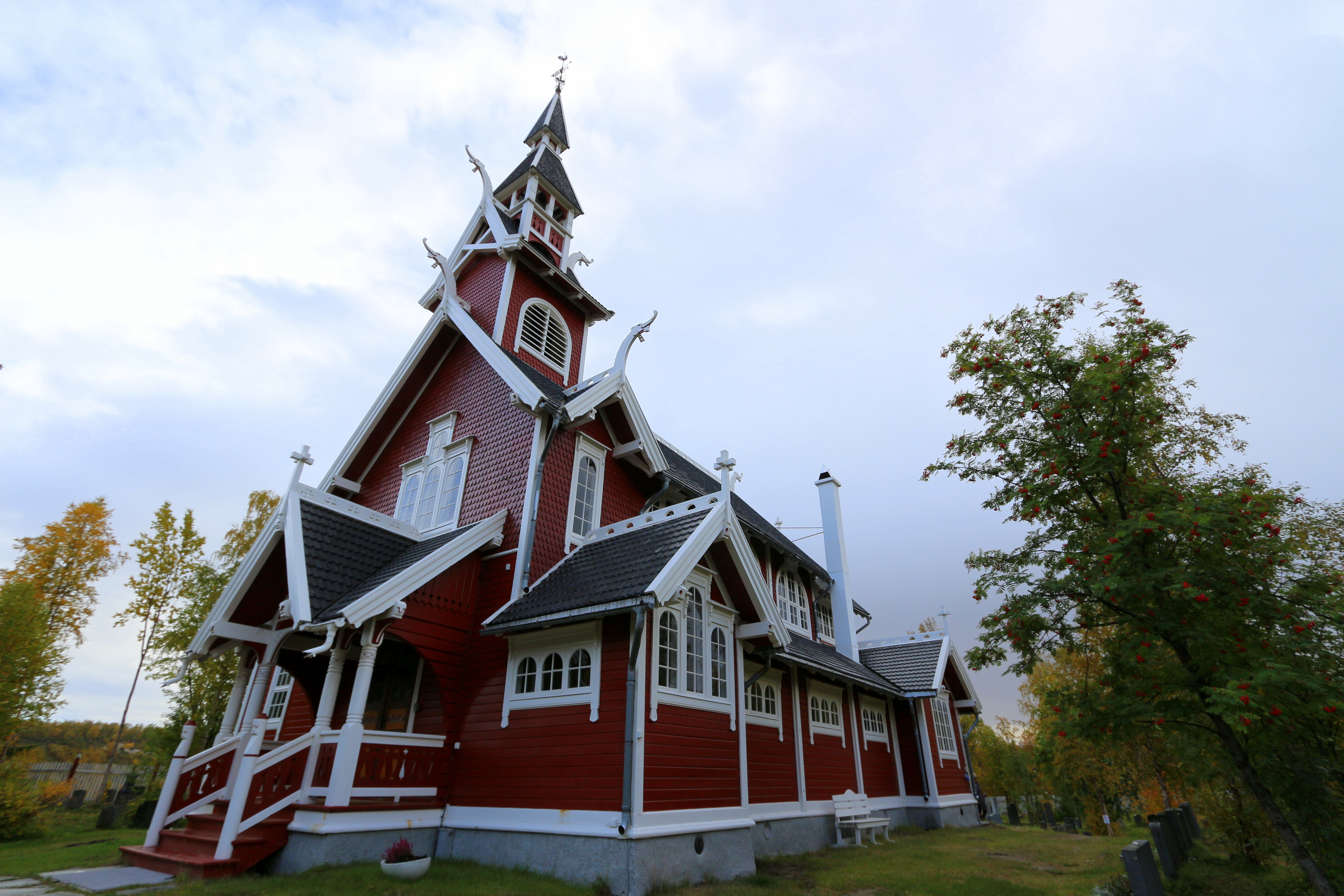

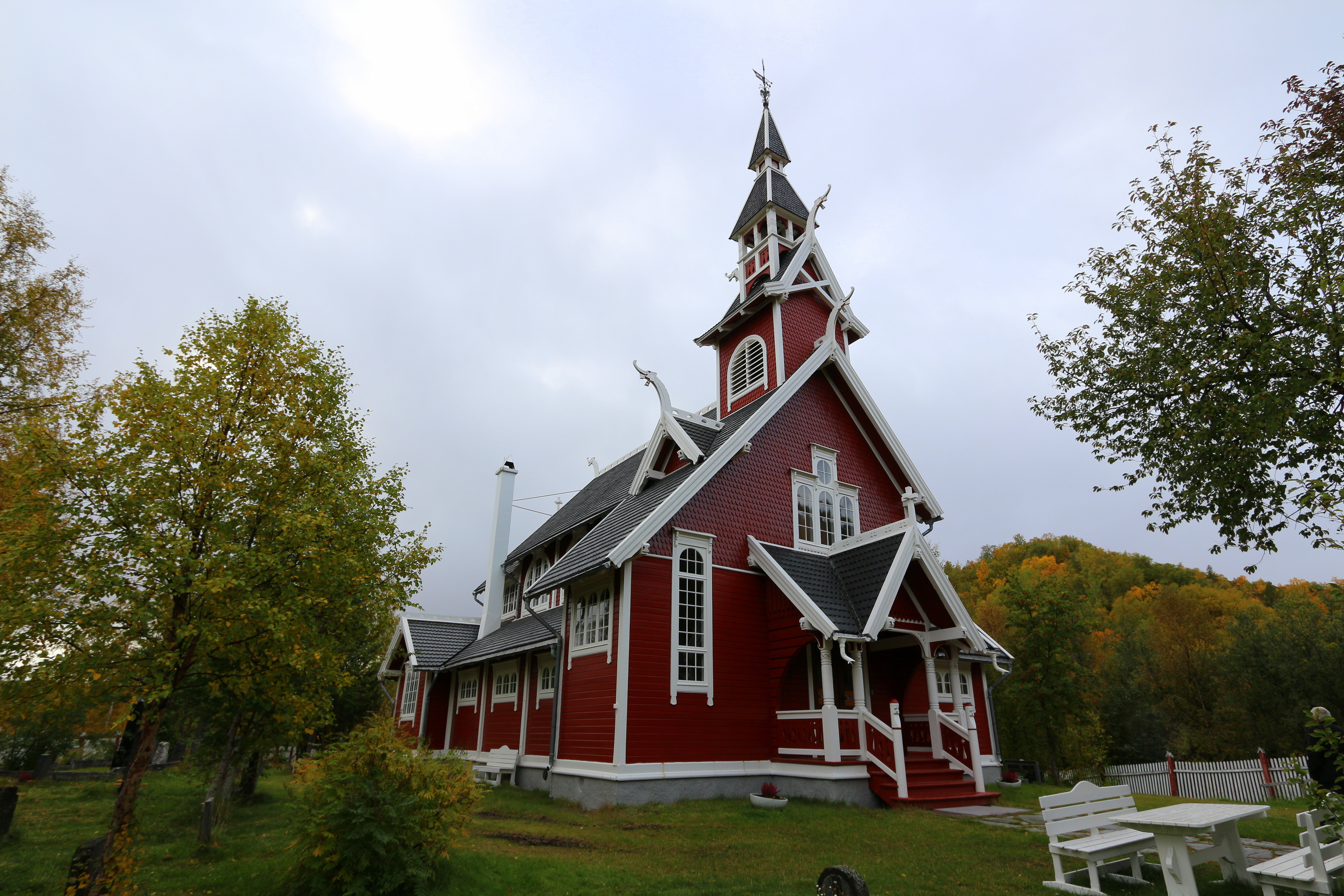

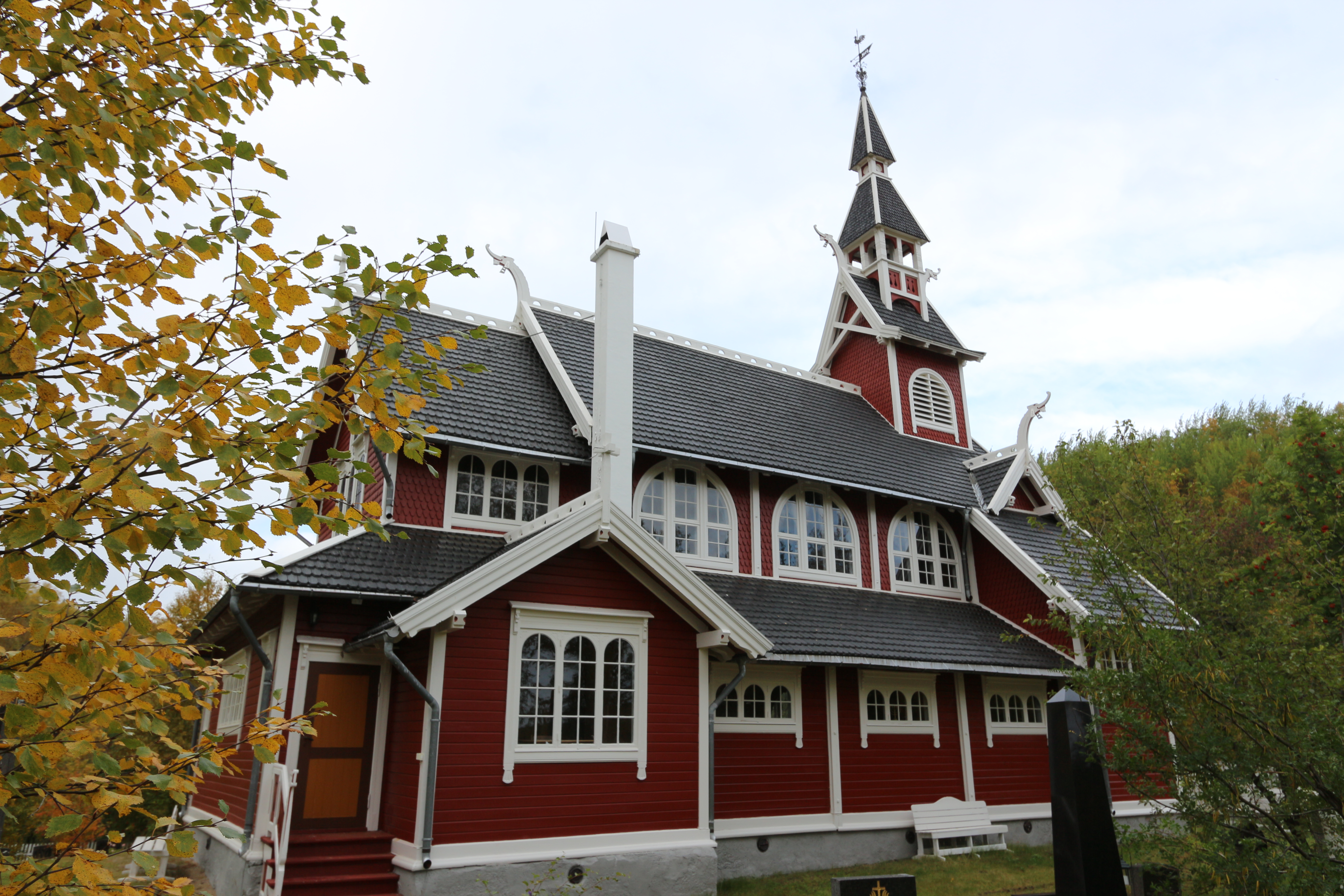

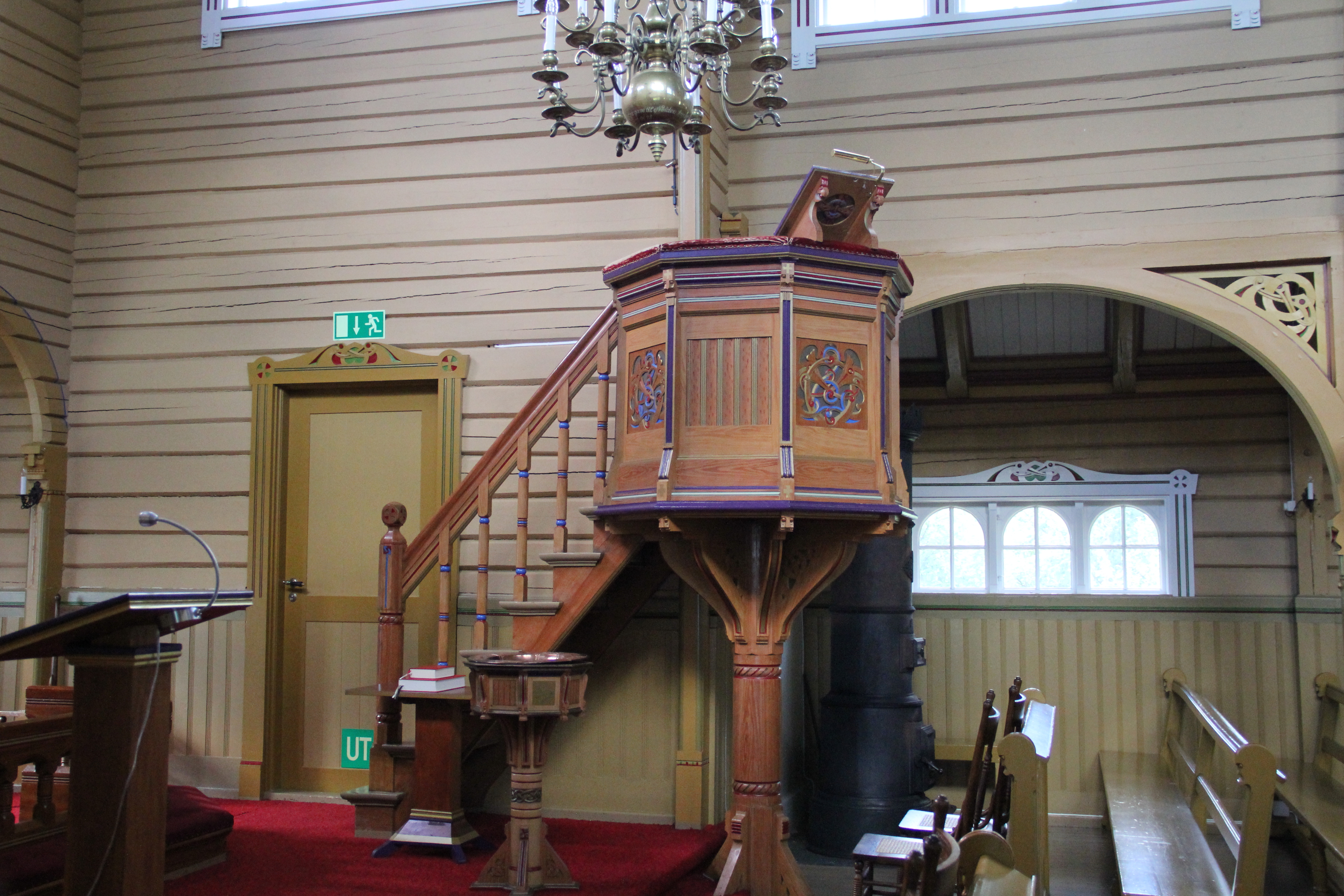

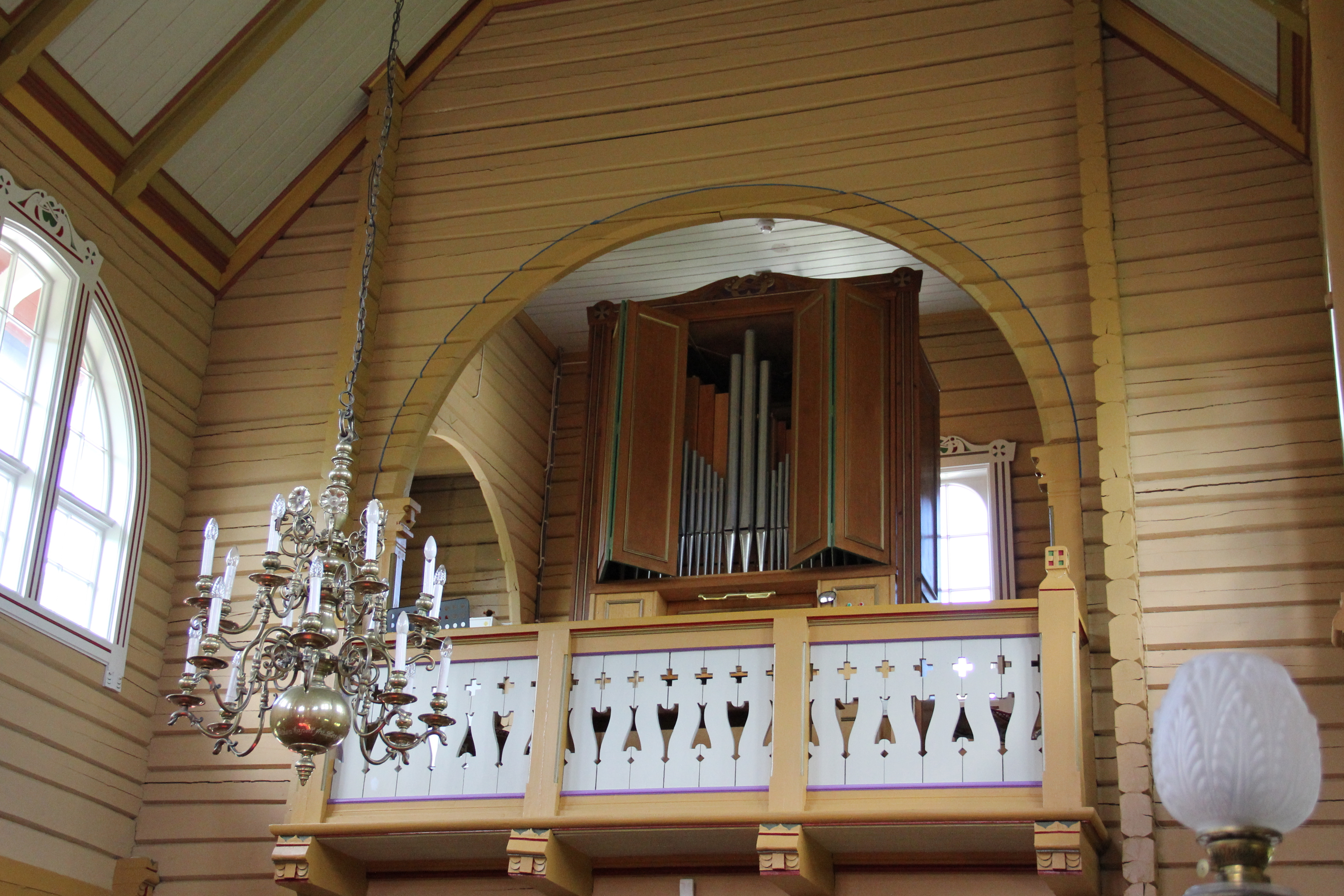

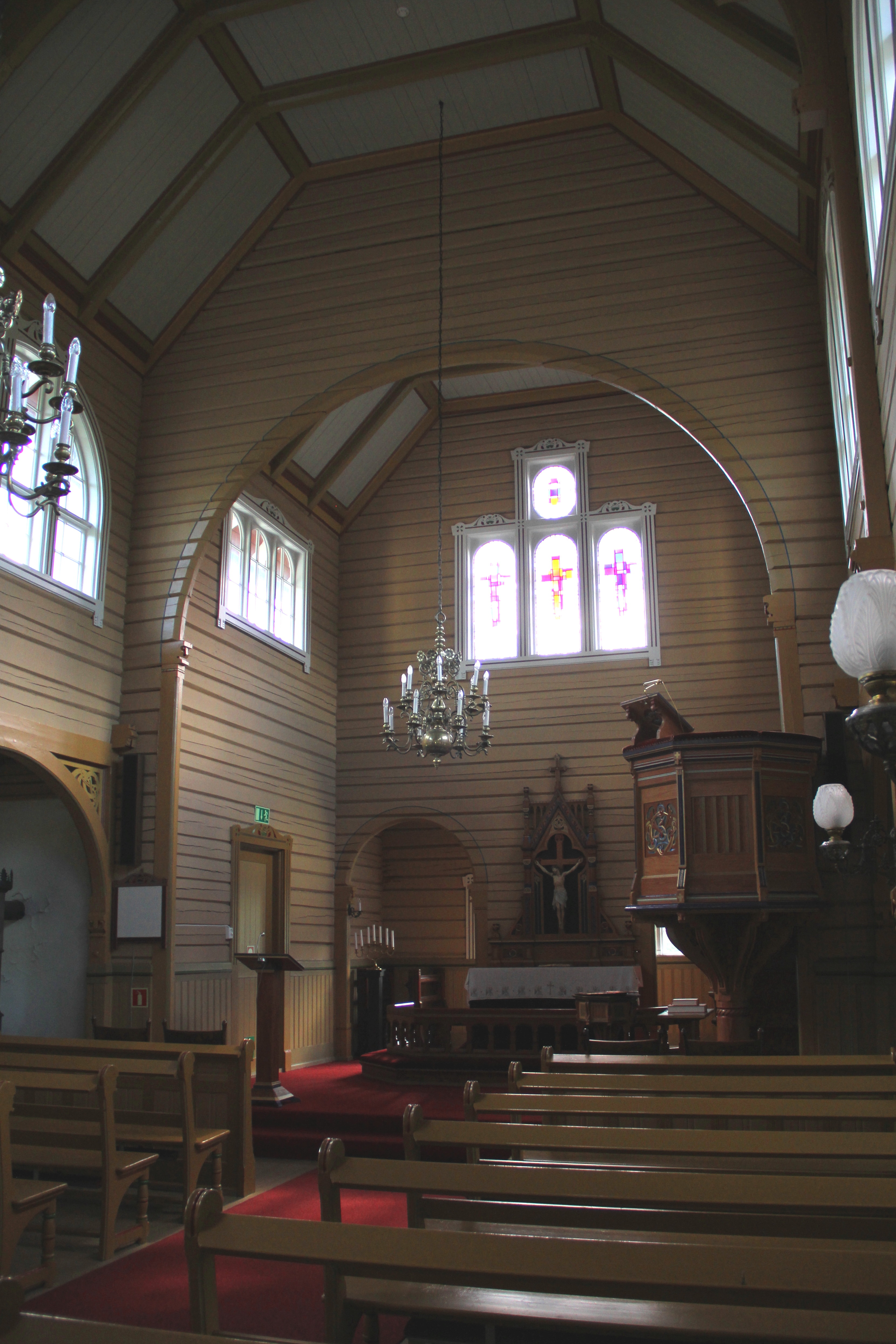

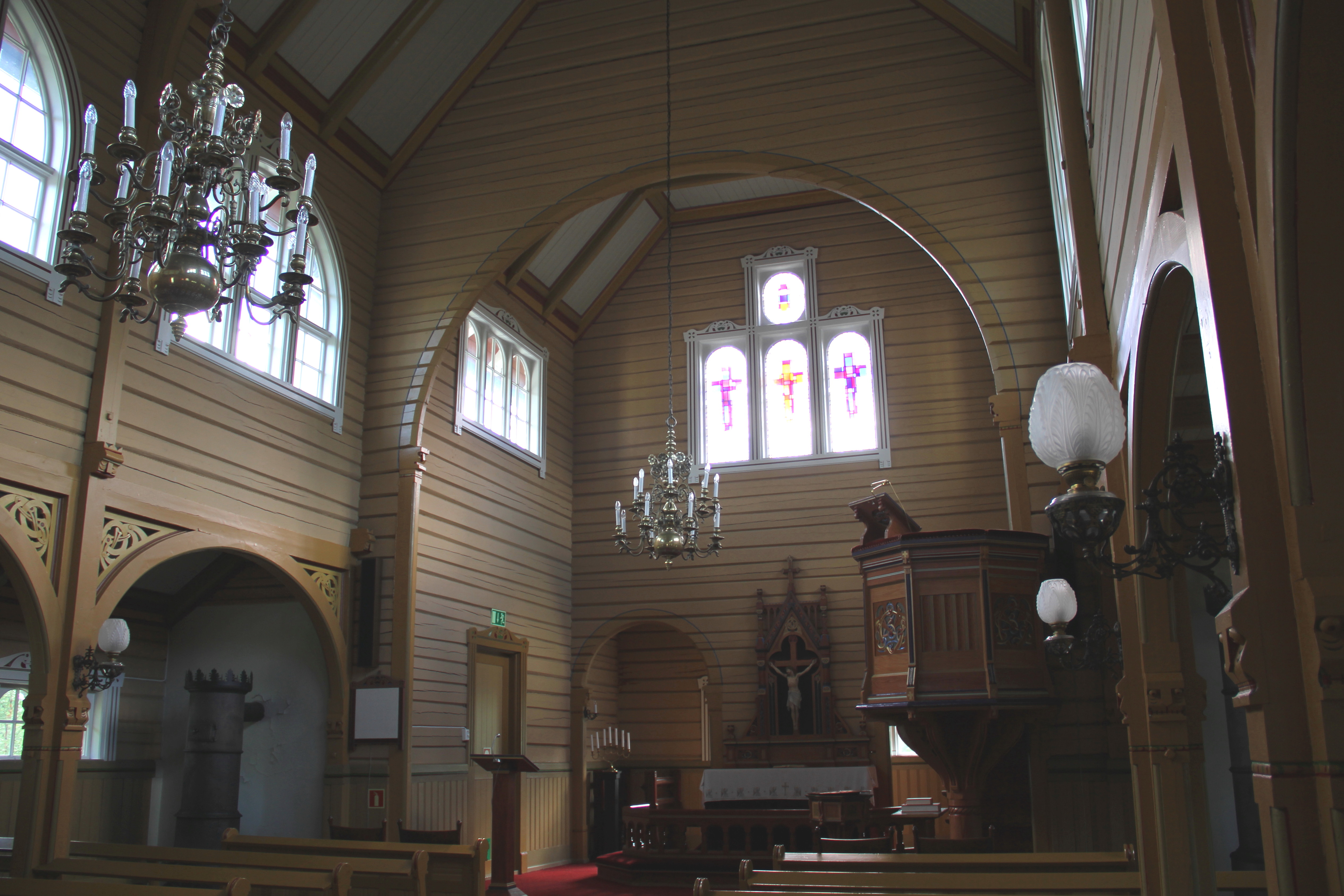

== See also ==
- List of churches in Nord-Hålogaland
