= Sortland Church =

Church in Nordland, Norway

- Sortland kirke
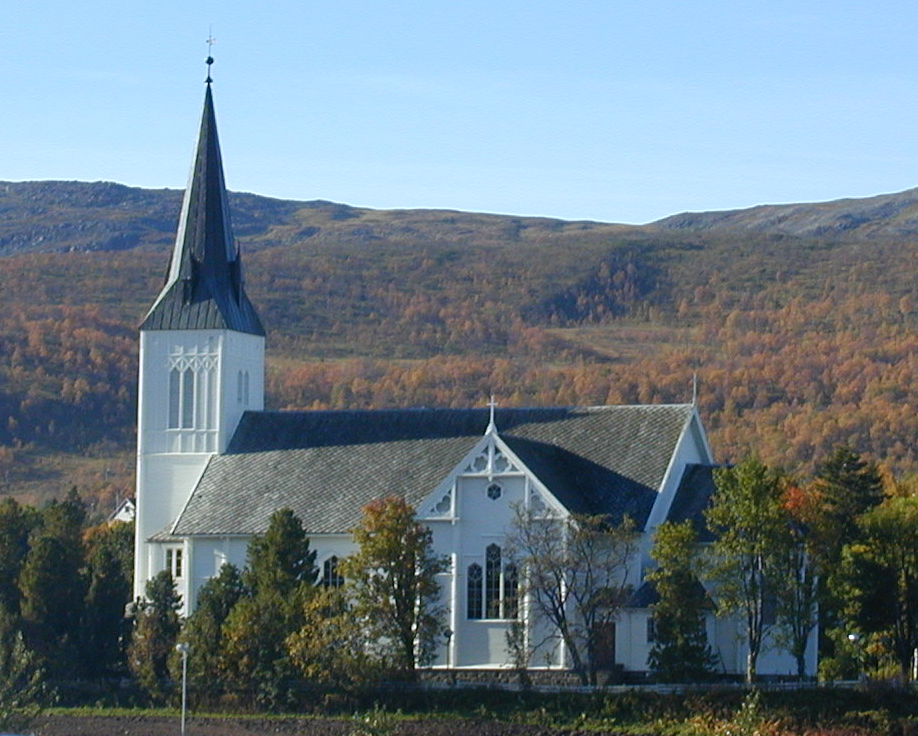
- View of the church
- Sortland Church
- 68.7002884°N 15.4122667°E
- Location: Sortland Municipality, Nordland
- Country: Norway
- Denomination: Church of Norway
- Churchmanship: Evangelical Lutheran

History
- Status: Parish church
- Founded: 14th century
- Consecrated: 1901

Architecture
- Functional status: Active
- Architectural type: Cruciform
- Style: Neo-Gothic
- Completed: 1901 (125 years ago)

Specifications
- Capacity: 696
- Materials: Wood

Administration
- Diocese: Sør-Hålogaland
- Deanery: Vesterålen prosti
- Parish: Sortland
- Norwegian Cultural Heritage Site
- Type: Church
- Status: Listed
- ID: 85528

Sortland Church (Norwegian: Sortland kirke) is a parish church of the Church of Norway in Sortland Municipality in Nordland county, Norway. It is located in the town of Sortland. It is one of the three churches for the Sortland parish which is part of the Vesterålen prosti (deanery) in the Diocese of Sør-Hålogaland. The white, wooden, neo-Gothic church was built in a cruciform style in 1901 using plans drawn up by the architects Carl Julius Bergstrøm and Karl Norum. The church seats about 696 people.

== History ==
The earliest existing historical records of this church date back to 1381, but the church was not new at that time. There have been several churches in Sortland over the centuries. The first churches in Sortland were located about 300 metres (980 ft) southeast of the present-day church, closer to the fjord. Not much is known about the medieval churches in Sortland, but records show a new church was built in 1676. It was a log building in a cruciform design. In 1803, the church was heavily renovated.

In 1814, this church served as an election church (Norwegian: valgkirke). Together with more than 300 other parish churches across Norway, it was a polling station for elections to the 1814 Norwegian Constituent Assembly which wrote the Constitution of Norway. This was Norway's first national elections. Each church parish was a constituency that elected people called "electors" who later met together in each county to elect the representatives for the assembly that was to meet at Eidsvoll Manor later that year.

By the early 1900s, the church was in poor condition. A new church site was chosen, about 300 metres (980 ft) northwest of the church. The new church was completed in 1902 and it seats nearly 700 people. After the new church was completed, the old church was torn down. The site of the old church was marked with a small building with the old church steeple and church bell on top and the area was made into a park.

== Media gallery ==
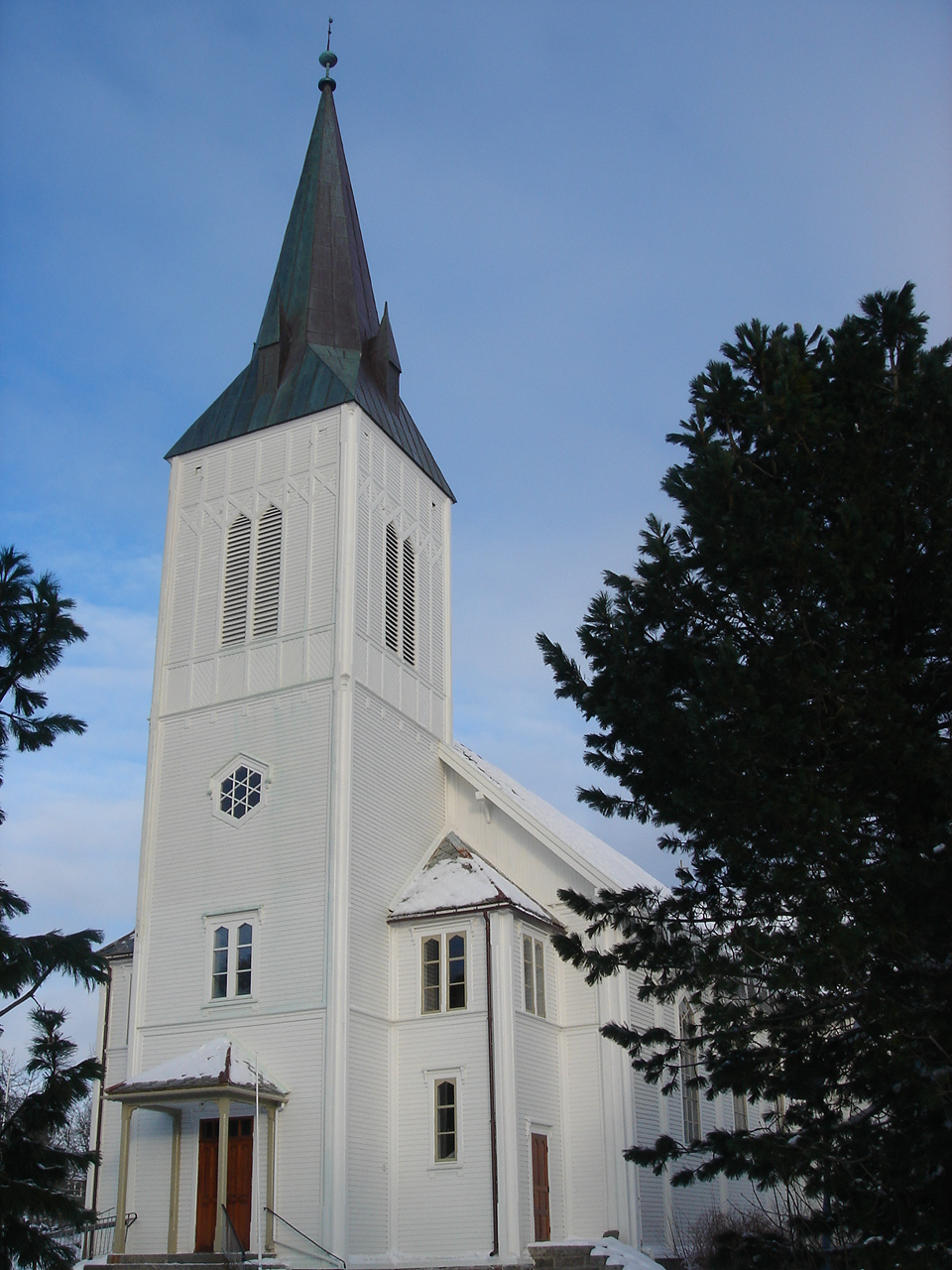

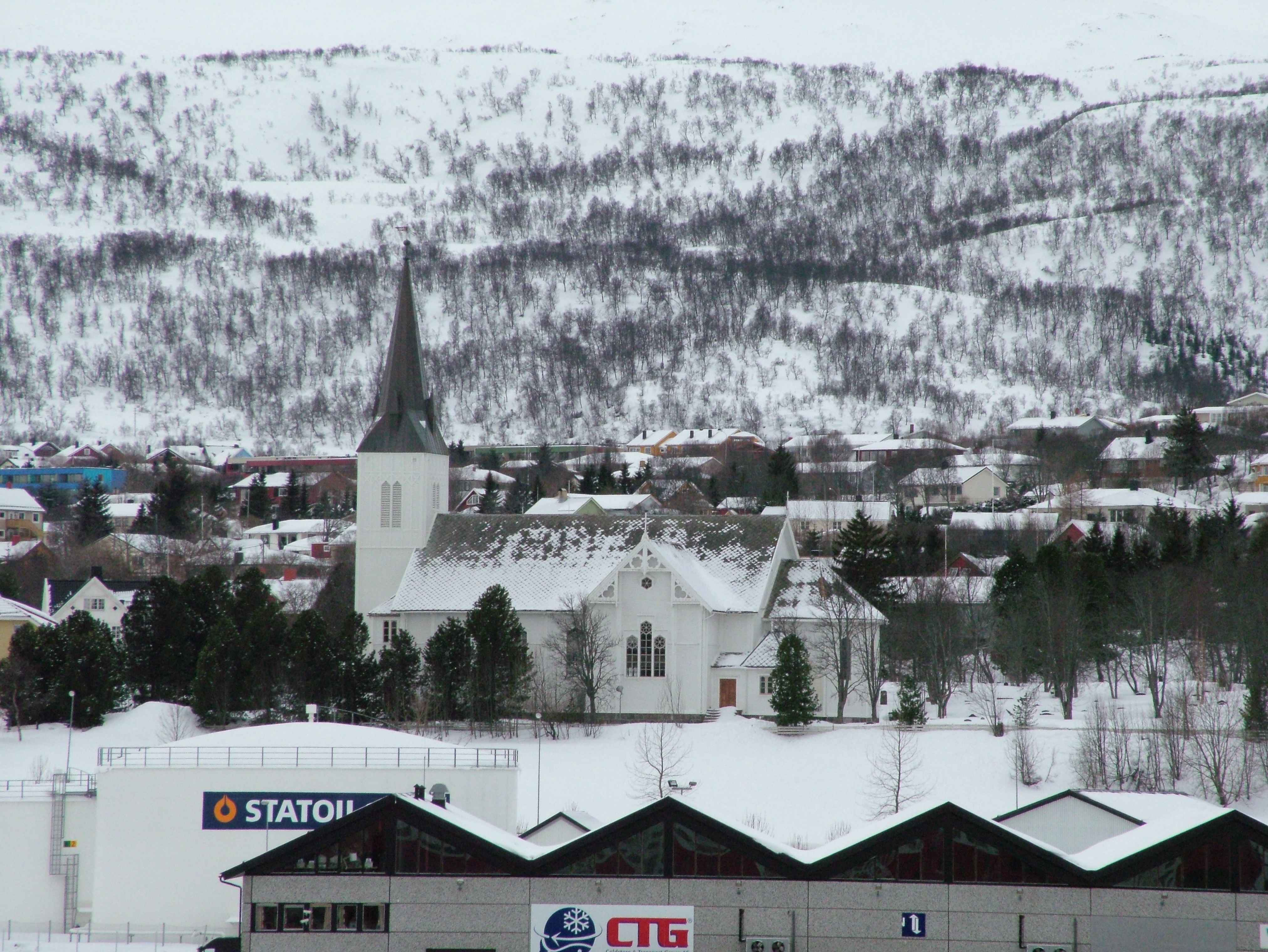

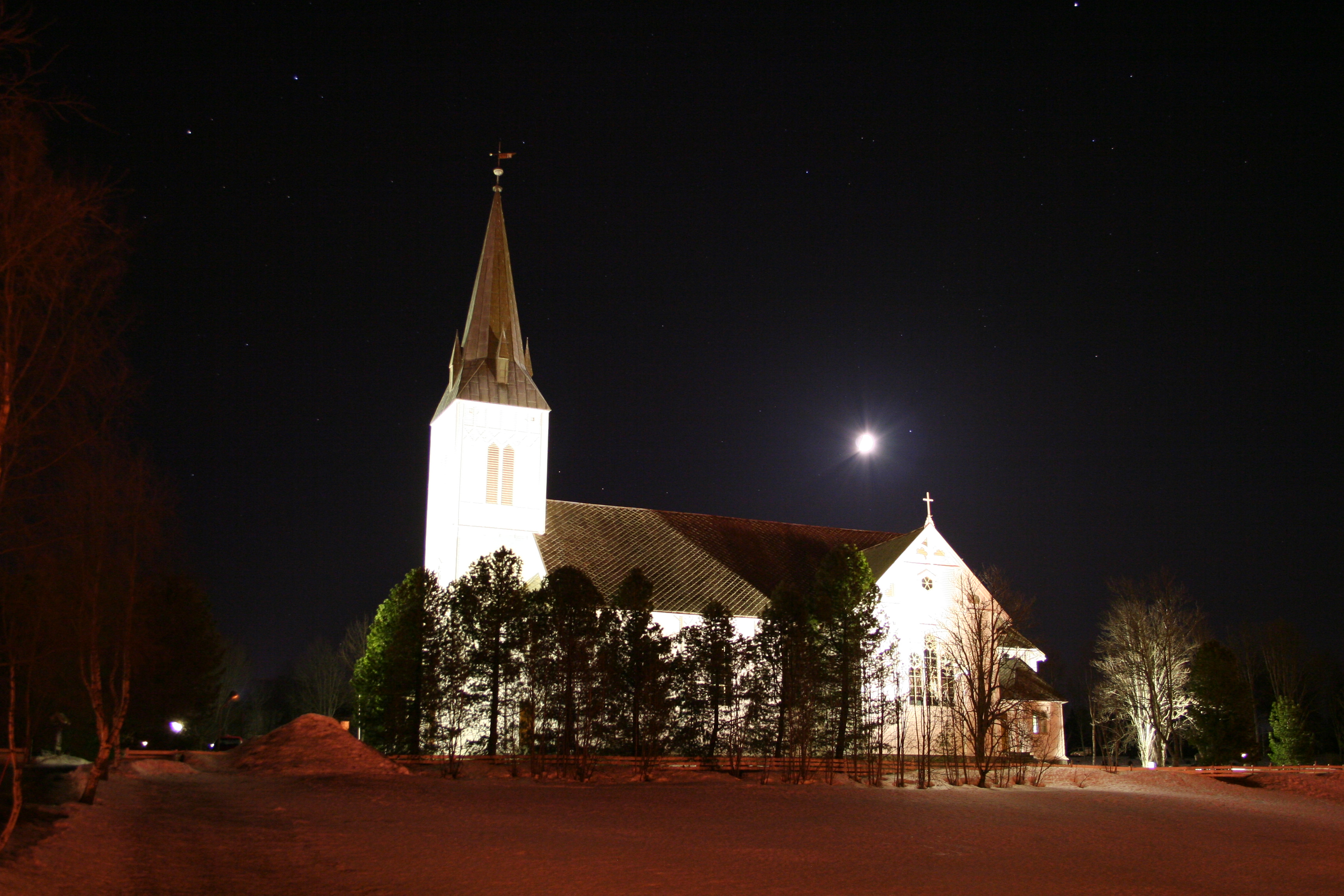

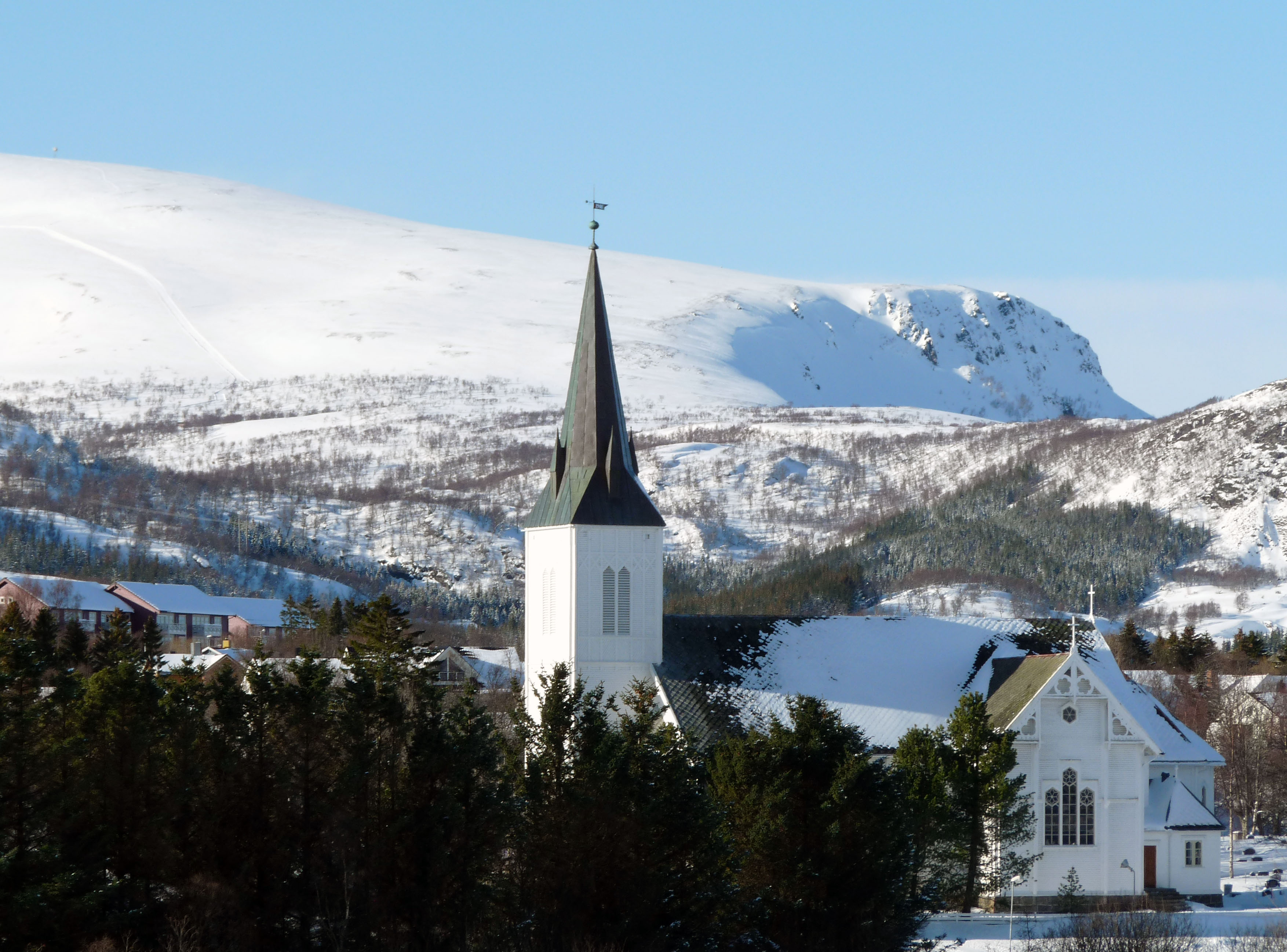

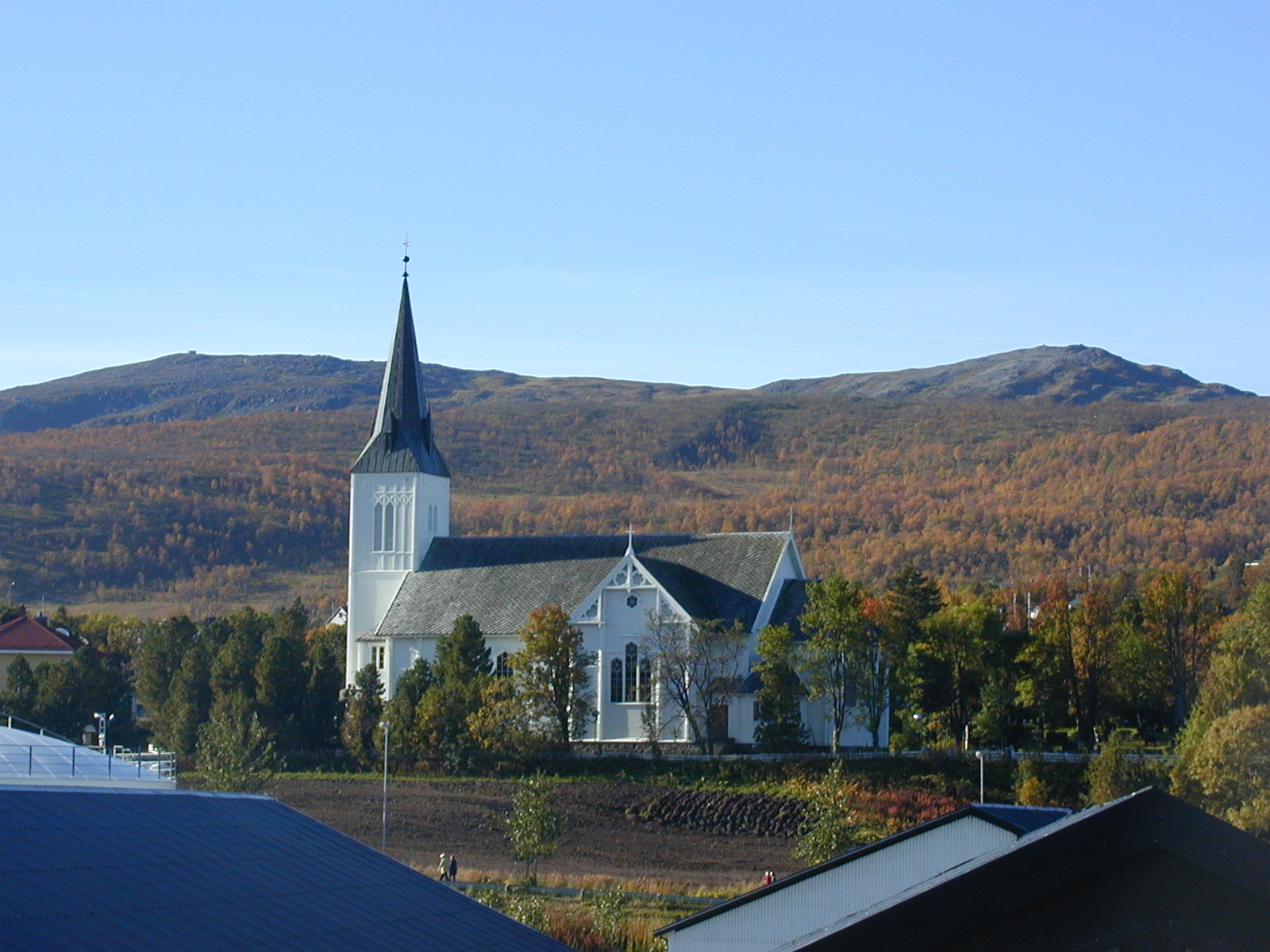

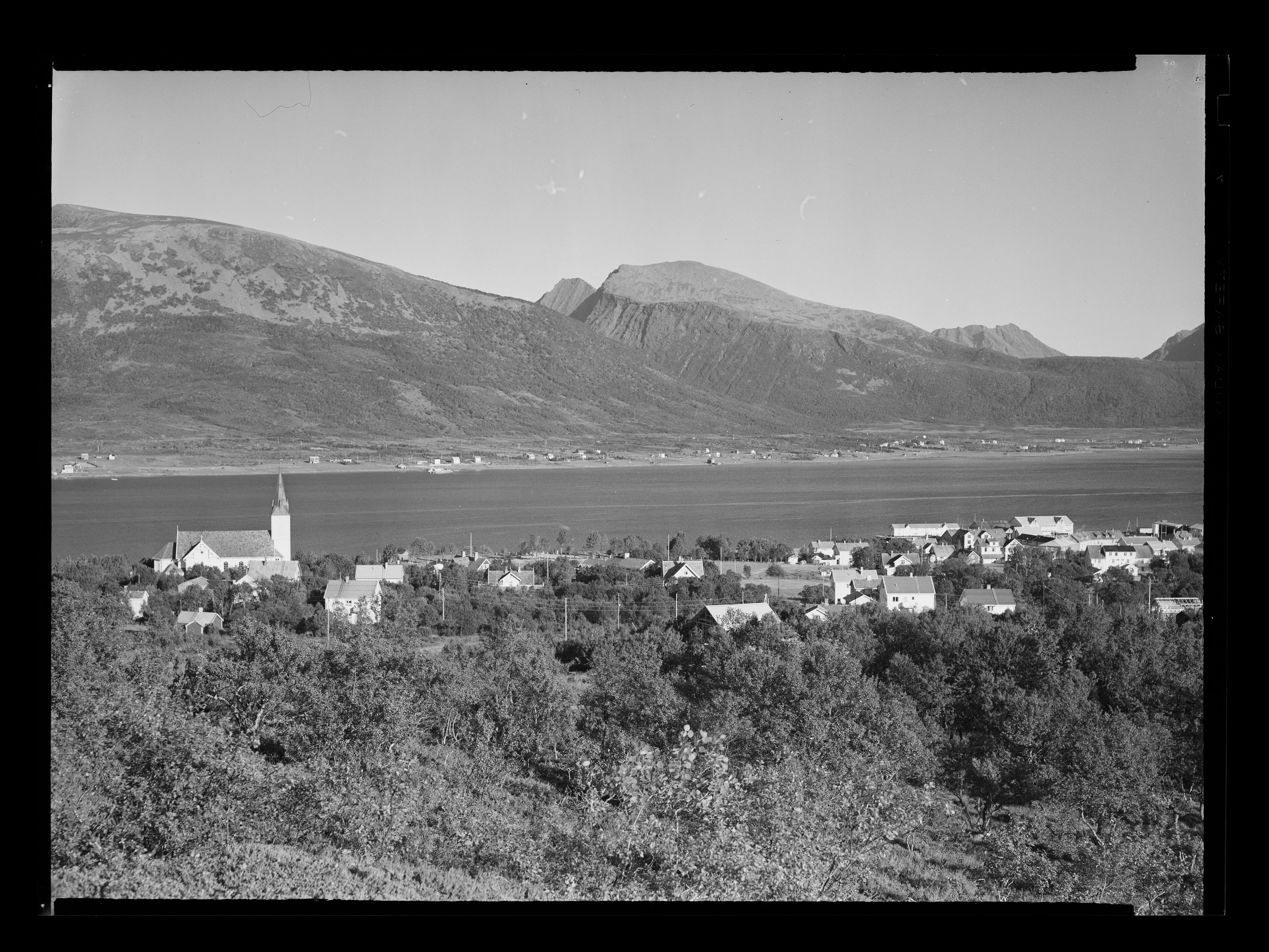

== See also ==
- List of churches in Sør-Hålogaland
