= Mittet =

Village in Rauma Municipality, Norway

- Village
- Interactive map of Mittet
- Location within Møre og Romsdal Location within Norway
- Coordinates: 62.7001°N 7.6911°E
- Country: Norway
- Region: Western Norway
- County: Møre og Romsdal
- District: Romsdal
- Municipality: Rauma Municipality
- Elevation: 6 m (20 ft)
- Time zone: UTC+01:00 (CET)
  - Summer (DST): UTC+02:00 (CEST)
- Post Code: 6363 Mittet

Mittet is a small village in the northern part of Rauma Municipality in Møre og Romsdal county, Norway. It is located on the south shore of the Langfjorden. Mittet has a population of about 150. It has a grocery store, gas station, and a camping site. Holm Church is located about 7 kilometres (4.3 mi) to the west of the village.

The Mittetelva river runs through the village into the Langfjorden. The river runs through the nearby Mittet valley and the river contains trout and salmon.
