= List of populated places in Morobe Province =

Morobe Province

A List of populated places in Morobe Province, Papua New Guinea:

== A ==
- Afong
- Agaganda
- Ago
- Aimolau
- Ainsi
- Aiogi
- Aiogwei
- Aiuwo
- Aiwamba
- Akandang
- Akwangi
- Akwanje
- Aluki
- Amelingan
- Amien
- Amoa
- Ana
- Anandea
- Anandor
- Andandora
- Andorora
- Angabena
- Angabu
- Angau
- Angeiwunga
- Anggaie
- Angweta
- Aningi
- Antiguran
- Antiragin
- Apalap
- Apo
- Arabuka
- Aregenang
- Arifiran
- Arifogo
- Aringi
- Aringona
- Aro
- Aseki
- Asini
- Asolani
- Atapaura
- Atsuk
- Atsunas
- Atwara
- Aupo
- Au
- Auno
- Aven
- Avenggu
- Awaiepa
- Aweaka

== B ==
- Badibo
- Badzuluo
- Baime
- Bain'nu
- Baiune
- Bakaia Number 1
- Bakaia Number 2
- Bakia
- Bakokono
- Bakon
- Balangko
- Balilaua
- Balum
- Bamurufto
- Bangalum Bridge
- Bangdap
- Bantamu
- Bapi (7°'0"S 146°59'0"E)
- Bapi (7°49'0"S 147°'0"E)
- Barang
- Barim
- Batoro
- Bau
- Beding
- Belombibi
- Beluok
- Beni
- Benula
- Berakwaiyu
- Besibong
- Biaboli
- Biauwa
- Biawaria
- Biaweng
- Bibera
- Bilga
- Bilimang
- Birik
- Biring
- Bitoi
- Biuingen
- Black Cat
- Boana
- Bobadu
- Bogabuang
- Bogasu
- Bogeba
- Boisi
- Bokasu
- Bolimang
- Bolingbongen
- Boneia
- Bonga
- Bongganko
- Bonggi
- Bopirumpum
- Boroke
- Bua
- Buakup
- Buangi
- Buengim
- Bugaim
- Bugang
- Bugwer
- Buharu
- Buiambum
- Buiane
- Bukaua
- Bukauasip
- Buki
- Bukum
- Bulamanong
- Bulantim
- Bulcara
- Bulolo
- Bulu (6°2'0"S 147°'0"E)
- Bulu (7°6'0"S 146°5'0"E)
- Bulwat
- Bumayong
- Bumba
- Bumbu (5°59'0"S 145°5'0"E)
- Bumbu (6°'0"S 147°10'0"E)
- Bungalamba
- Bupu
- Busama
- Buseng
- Busian
- Busiga
- Buso
- Busung
- Butala
- Butaweng
- Butibum 1
- Buwai
- Bwakugu
- Bwambi
- Bwasia
- Bwussi

== C-D ==
- Chimbuluk
- Chivasing
- Dahu
- Daia
- Daku
- Dakum
- Dali
- Dalugilomon
- Danatum
- Daudoro
- Dawong
- Dawot
- Dengalu
- Dengando
- Derim
- Derongge
- Doing
- Dokalang
- Dolo
- Domut
- Dona
- Drong
- Dubi
- Dungatung

== E-F ==
- Ebabang
- Edie Creek
- Efafan
- Eiba
- Eipa
- Embewanang
- Emengwaning
- Erap
- Erendengan
- Esianda
- Etaitno
- Etep
- Etobanga
- Ewok
- Ezanko
- Faseu
- Finschhafen
- Finungwa
- Fior
- Fofragen
- Fondengko

== G ==
- Gabagata
- Gabensis
- Gabmatzung
- Gabsonkek
- Gaieng
- Galawo
- Gamarok
- Ganma
- Gantisap
- Ganzegan
- Garaina
- Garambon
- Garawaria
- Garli
- Gasam
- Gatseng
- Gauinlabu
- Gauru
- Gawan
- Gehan
- Gemaheng (6°2'0"S 147°30'0"E)
- Gemaheng (6°25'0"S 147°'0"E)
- Gena
- Gene
- Geraun
- Gerepo
- Gerup
- Gewak
- Gilang
- Gingala
- Gingora
- Gitua
- Gitukia
- Gobadik
- Godowa
- Gofan
- Golangke
- Gom (5°35'0"S 147°47'0"E)
- Gom (6°19'0"S 146°38'0"E)
- Gomando
- Gombwato
- Gomena
- Gomlongon
- Gorgiok
- Gori
- Gotet
- Gowa
- Guabagusal
- Gubu
- Gumana
- Gumi
- Gumun
- Gunabosing
- Gunazaking
- Guruf
- Gurukor
- Gurunkor
- Gusak
- Gusap
- Guswei
- Gwado
- Gwaloik
- Gwang
- Gwinlankor

== H ==
- Hamaronong
- Hamdingnan
- Hamoronong
- Hamuni
- Hapahondong
- Hawata
- Hawaweto
- Hekwangi
- Hem
- Hemang
- Hendeneng
- Hengune
- Hiakwata
- Hiakwoto
- Hikwak
- Himerka
- Hiwabri
- Hompua
- Hongo
- Honpato
- Honziuknan
- Hoperang
- Hota
- Hote
- Hubegong
- Hudewa

== I-J ==
- Iagobei
- Ibagei
- Igerua
- Ikyaua
- Ilavu
- Iloko (6°'0"S 147°'0"E)
- Iloko (6°16'0"S 147°10'0"E)
- Imon
- Indagen
- Indum
- Intoap
- Isan
- Isosargan
- Iwapu
- Iwatimna
- Jivevaneng

== K ==
- Kabakini
- Kabong
- Kabum
- Kabwum
- Kaiapit
- Kainye
- Kaisenik
- Kaisia
- Kakalo
- Kalasu
- Kaletta
- Kamanahai
- Kamari, Papua New Guinea
- Kamaua, Papua New Guinea
- Kamiaturn
- Kamloa
- Kampepe
- Kangarua
- Kanomi
- Kanzarua
- Kapin Number 1
- Kapin Number 2
- Kapiso
- Karakwa
- Karangan (6°'0"S 147°'0"E)
- Karangan (6°20'0"S 146°38'0"E)
- Kasanga
- Kasangari
- Kasangari Number 1
- Kasangari Number 2
- Kasanombe
- Kasin
- Kasu
- Kasu 2
- Kasuma
- Kataipa
- Katika
- Katumani Hamlet
- Kaumanga
- Kaunangisi
- Kaungko
- Kaunkiol
- Kaura
- Kaurau
- Kawaren
- Keili
- Kekewana
- Kelanoa
- Kelkel
- Kemb
- Kembakn
- Kemburum
- Kesin
- Kieta
- Kinalakna
- Kindupu
- Kingfaringau
- Kip
- Kipu
- Kisengam
- Kisituen
- Kiwsawa
- Kobau
- Kobia
- Kobiak
- Kobio
- Koi Iavi
- Koi Iopo
- Koi'ioro
- Koilil
- Koiyan
- Koki
- Kolem
- Komagowatta
- Komalakatcha
- Komban
- Komiatum
- Komutu
- Kondolop
- Konimbo
- Kopa
- Koparaka
- Kor
- Korbau
- Korenga
- Korepa
- Kornade
- Korteio
- Koru
- Korumba
- Kotkin
- Krututa
- Kudjeru
- Kukuya
- Kulami
- Kulavi
- Kumbip
- Kumdarong
- Kumisi
- Kumukio
- Kurin
- Kusi
- Kwadungwi
- Kwagaga
- Kwalansam
- Kwampiang
- Kwamu
- Kwandagogi
- Kwapsanek
- Kwasang
- Kwasang 2
- Kwasimerga
- Kwatomane
- Kwekwendangu
- Kwembu
- Kwembung
- Kwenliki
- Kwenzenzeng
- Kwietta

== L ==
- Lababia
- Labisap
- Lae
- Lakala
- Lakona
- Lalang
- Lama
- Langa
- Lanitzera
- Latep
- Laumgei
- Laundi
- Laurepo
- Lebangande
- Lega
- Leklu
- Leko
- Lengbati
- Lewamon
- Logui
- Lokanu
- Lomalam
- Longmon
- Lumbaip

== M ==
- Magazain
- Magedzetzu
- Mainyanda
- Malahang Mission
- Malangata
- Malanpipi
- Malasiga
- Mama
- Mamaringan
- Mambump
- Mami
- Mangam
- Mange
- Mangga
- Maniag
- Manki
- Mape
- Mapos
- Maran
- Mararamu
- Mararuo
- Mari (6°12'0"S 146°17'0"E)
- Mari (6°39'0"S 146°'0"E)
- Marilinan
- Masa
- Masangko
- Mawaning
- Meiawa
- Mek
- Mekini
- Melandum
- Menya
- Menyamya
- Menyi
- Meri Creek
- Merikeo
- Mimi
- Mindik
- Mismis
- Missim
- Mo
- Moikisung
- Momalili
- Morago
- Moreng
- Motete
- Mouini
- Mula
- Mumeng
- Mumeng 2
- Mumengtein
- Mumum
- Mumunggan
- Mundala
- Mungo
- Muniau
- Muniwa
- Munkip
- Munum
- Mup
- Musep
- Musom

== N ==
- Nabak
- Nadzab
- Nako
- Nama
- Namie
- Nanda
- Nanduo
- Narawapum
- Nariawang
- Narowaine
- Nasawasiang
- Nasingalatu
- Nauti (7°16'0"S 146°'0"E)
- Nauti (7°19'0"S 146°35'0"E)
- Neiet'nda
- Nemau Hamlet
- Nemnem
- Nengit
- New Yunzain
- Ngaragooma
- Ngasawapum
- Nguzi
- Nima
- Nimbako
- Nineia
- Nomanene
- Nuk Nuk
- Numbut
- Numenga
- Nuzen

== O ==
- Ogeramnang
- Oiwa
- Old Bangalum
- Old Yunzain
- Oligadu
- Omalai
- Omili
- Omisuan
- Ondatera
- Onga
- Onggake
- Onuk
- Oomsis
- Opai
- Orarako
- Oropot
- Otibanda

== P ==
- Pafiu
- Pagua
- Papekani
- Parorora
- Passaia
- Patep Number 1
- Patep Number 2
- Pauamunga
- Paukwanga
- Peawa
- Peila
- Peisu
- Pelenkwa
- Pendeng
- Perakles
- Pesen
- Pilimung
- Pinang
- Pindiu
- Pingamunga
- Pobung
- Podzorong
- Poiyu
- Popoi
- Posei
- Puahom Yanga
- Puleng

== Q-S ==
- Qaga
- Rarabo
- Rebafu
- Ririwo
- Ros Kar
- Rua
- Sadou
- Safifi (6°29'0"S 147°32'0"E)
- Safifi (6°'0"S 147°36'0"E)
- Sagaiyo
- Saiko
- Sakam
- Samantiki
- Samanzing
- Sambangan
- Sambe
- Samberang
- Sambiang
- Sambio
- Sambori
- Sambue
- Samep
- Sam Sam Number 1
- Sam Sam Number 2
- Sananga
- Sanaronong
- Sangan
- Sangas
- Sanon
- Sanzeng
- Sapa
- Sapanda
- Sape
- Satneng
- Satop
- Satpagna
- Satwag
- Saungne
- Saureli
- Scharnhorst
- Selebop
- Selepet
- Selimbeng
- Semgeta
- Serepo
- Shon'hau
- Siaga
- Siang (5°59'0"S 146°58'0"E)
- Siang (6°25'0"S 146°'0"E)
- Siapan
- Sikam
- Sikikia
- Sikwong
- Sililio
- Silimana
- Simbang
- Simbeng
- Singaua
- Singeiapa
- Singor
- Singorokai
- Sipa
- Sisi
- Siu (6°22'0"S 147°2'0"E)
- Siu (7°5'0"S 147°37'0"E)
- Sivebo
- Siwea
- Siyugei
- Slate Creek
- Sokaneng
- Sokelen
- Songgin
- Sopa
- Sorong
- Sosoninko
- Soweng
- Suewitne
- Sugan
- Sugu
- Sukurum
- Sumu
- Sunde
- Sunshine
- Sutang

== T ==
- Tahmas
- Taiak
- Takop
- Tali
- Tamigudu
- Tamoi
- Tarawe
- Tareko
- Tau'inni
- Tauknawe
- Tauris
- Tekadu
- Tereran
- Tiferan
- Tigedu
- Tikeling
- Tiku
- Timanogosa
- Timne
- Timowong
- Tipsit
- Tiren
- Tirimure
- Titauwawi
- Tobaigo
- Tokanin
- Tori
- Totomea
- Towat
- Tsile Tsile
- Tsinjangogwi
- Tumbuna (6°35'0"S 146°9'0"E)
- Tumbuna (6°37'0"S 146°5'0"E)
- Tumnang
- Tumung
- Tunge

== U-V ==
- Ubaneng
- Ukilim
- Ulugudu
- Uluor
- Umba (7°'0"S 145°58'0"E)
- Umba (7°2'0"S 145°58'0"E)
- Umdamna
- Ungesu
- Ununu
- Upat
- Vemop

== W ==
- Wabazeira
- Wagang
- Waganluhu
- Wagazaring
- Wago
- Waiganda
- Wain Camp
- Wainsodina
- Waipali
- Walingai
- Wampangan
- Wamuri
- Wanam
- Wandini
- Wandokai
- Wandumi
- Wanimbun
- Wantoat
- Wap
- Wapalala
- Waran
- Wareo
- Wasin
- Wau
- Wauit
- Wauwoga
- Wavit
- Wekae
- Were Were
- Wetna
- Wideru
- Windowi
- Winima
- Wisi
- Woimbo
- Wompul
- Wongat
- Worin
- Wowas
- Wudjini
- Wudzi
- Wunangapan
- Wununga
- Wuru
- Wuruf
- Wuwu
- Waria

== Y ==
- Yagepa
- Yagoine
- Yakot
- Yalu
- Yamanzako
- Yambo
- Yambong
- Yampua
- Yandu
- Yanga
- Yangla
- Yanta
- Yanuf
- Yapang
- Yari
- Yasingli
- Yatsing
- Yauwipu
- Yawan
- Yeggie
- Yeiweni
- Yelaua
- Yemli
- Yinimba
- Yokua
- Yowong
- Yunggu

== Z ==
- Zafilio
- Zagahemi
- Zakubep
- Zalimpa
- Zanggung
- Zankoa
- Zare
- Zenag
- Zengaren
- Zenguru
- Zewitzan (6°25'0"S 147°20'0"E)
- Zewitzan (6°'0"S 147°2'0"E)
- Zezaging
- Zinaba
- Zingko
- Zitari
- Zongafifi
- Zoroge
- Zunzumua
