= Aro =

Aro or ARO may refer to:

== People ==
- Aro (surname)
- Aro people, an Igbo subgroup in West Africa
- Aro (murderer) (died 1957), last person executed in Papua New Guinea
- Aro (Twilight), a character in the Twilight saga by Stephenie Meyer
- Aro, a deity in Igbo mythology
- ARO, stage name for actress/musician Aimee Osbourne (birth name Aimee Rachel Osbourne)

== Places ==
- Årø (Denmark), a small island in the Lillebælt in Denmark
- Årø, Norway, a neighborhood of Molde
- Aro, Papua New Guinea, a village in Morobe Province
- Aro River, a tributary of the Orinoco River in Venezuela

== Other ==
- ARO (company) (Auto Romania), defunct off-road vehicle manufacturer
- ARO (building), one of the tallest buildings in New York City
- Aro Confederacy, a precolonial Igbo trading oligarchy in West Africa
- Aro gTér, a lineage within Tibetan Buddhism
- Abbreviation of aromantic, a lack of romantic orientation
- Algonquin Radio Observatory, a radio telescope research facility in Ontario, Canada
- Arctic Research Office, a division of the US NOAA
- Army Research Office, a department of the United States Army Research Laboratory
- Average rate option, a type of financial instrument
- Annual rate of occurrence, risk management term for yearly number of times an event occurs
- Asset retirement obligation, a financial liability which provides for future disposal of assets
- Authentic Renewal Organization, a Venezuelan political party
- Agricultural Research Organization, of the Israeli Ministry of Agriculture
- American Riviera Orchard, an American lifestyle brand
- the former stock ticker symbol for Aéropostale
- Azure Red Hat OpenShift, a computer server type runtime platform for cloud based software projects
- The Aari language, an Omotic language of Ethiopia
- ATS Reporting Office, a component of the air traffic service

== See also ==
- Aero (disambiguation)
- Årø (disambiguation)
- Aros (disambiguation)
