= Kleive =

Kleive may refer to:

== People ==
- Iver Kleive (born 1949), a Norwegian composer and organist
- Audun Kleive (born 1961), a Norwegian musician

== Places ==
- Kleive, Buskerud, a village in Ål municipality, Buskerud county, Norway
- Kleive, Møre og Romsdal, a village in Molde municipality, Møre og Romsdal county, Norway
- Kleive Church, a church in Molde municipality, Møre og Romsdal county, Norway
