= Aros =

Aros may refer to:

- Aros (Middle-earth), a river in J. R. R. Tolkien's Middle-earth legendarium
- Aros, Mull, the location of Aros Castle, a ruined 13th-century castle on the Isle of Mull, Scotland
- AROS Research Operating System, a free software implementation of AmigaOS
- Aros, the original Viking name of Aarhus, the second largest city in Denmark
- ARoS Aarhus Kunstmuseum, an art museum in Aarhus
- Aros Centre, a cultural centre on the Isle of Skye
- Asia Regional Organic Standard (AROS)
- Aros, farm in Kintyre, Scotland, birthplace of William McTaggart senior, Scottish painter

== Åros ==
Åros (with the letter Å) may refer to:

- Åros, a village in Asker, Norway
- Åros, Søgne, a village in Southern Norway

== See also ==
- Aro (disambiguation)
