= Langfjorden =

Langfjorden (literally "The Long Fjord") may refer to:

- Langfjorden (Alta), arm of the Altafjord in Alta, Finnmark county, Norway
- Langfjorden (Loppa), a continuation of the Nordre and Søndre Bergsfjord, in Loppa, Finnmark county, Norway
- Langfjorden (Møre og Romsdal), arm of the Romsdalsfjord near Molde, Møre og Romsdal county, Norway
- Langfjorden (Nordland), fjord near Velfjord in Brønnøy, Nordland county, Norway
- Langfjorden (Troms), fjord near Arnøy in Skjervøy, Troms county, Norway
- Langfjorden (Sør-Varanger), arm of the Bøkfjord in Sør-Varanger, Finnmark county, Norway
- Langfjorden (Tana), arm of the Tanafjord in Deatnu-Tana, Finnmark county, Norway
- Langfjord Tunnel, proposed to cross the fjord in Møre og Romsdal
