= Årø, Norway =

Village in Molde Municipality, Norway

Årø
- Neighborhood in Molde
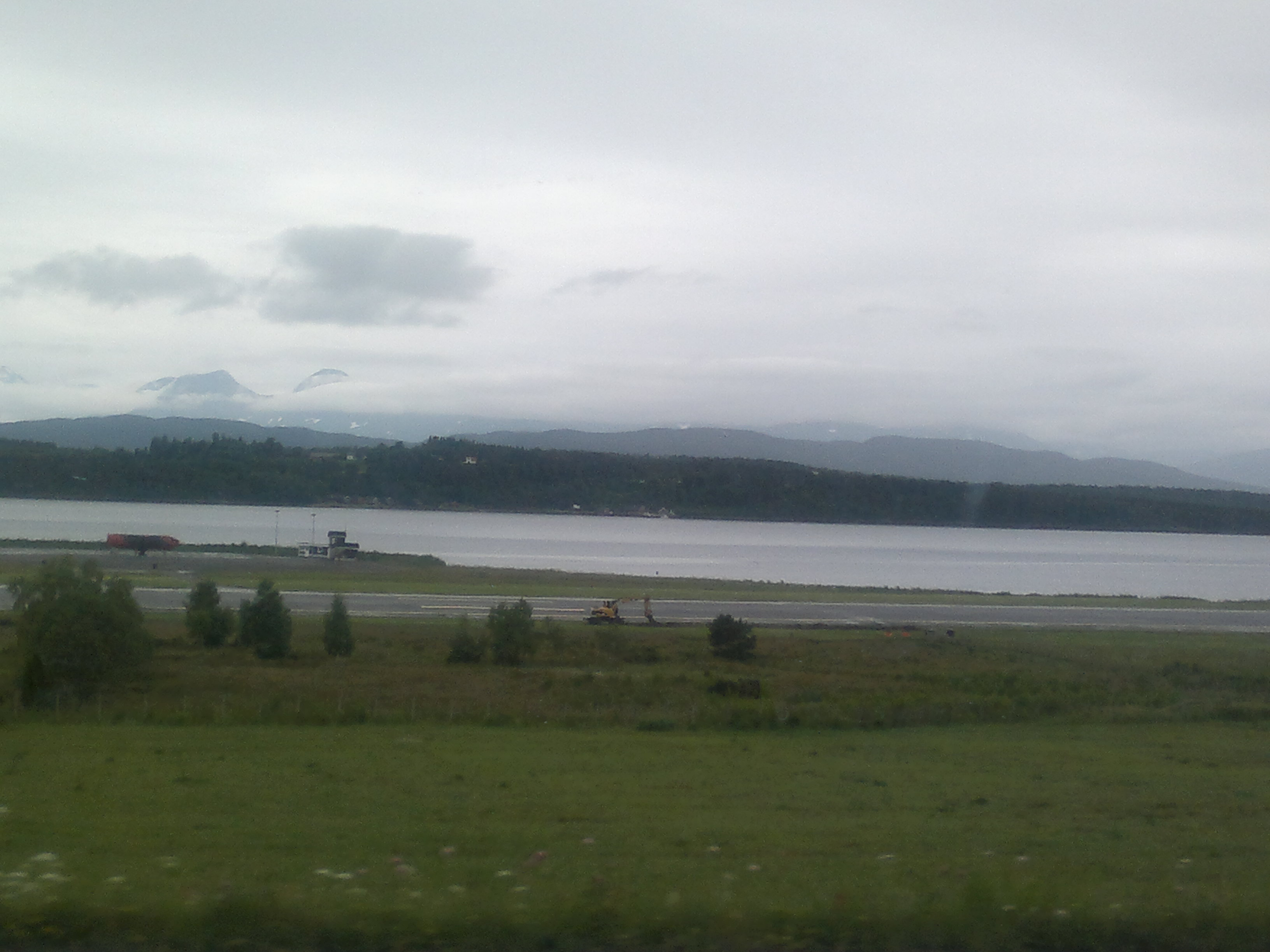
- View of the airport looking out to the fjord
- Interactive map of Årø
- Location within Møre og Romsdal Location within Norway
- Coordinates: 62.7453°N 7.25699°E
- Country: Norway
- Region: Western Norway
- County: Møre og Romsdal
- Municipality: Molde Municipality
- Elevation: 4 m (13 ft)
- Time zone: UTC+01:00 (CET)
  - Summer (DST): UTC+02:00 (CEST)
- Post Code: 6421 Molde

Årø is a neighborhood near the eastern edge of the town of Molde which is located in Molde Municipality in Møre og Romsdal county, Norway. The area is dominated by industry and it is the location of Molde Airport, Årø, the main airport for the Romsdal district.

Årø is located at the intersection of European Route E39, which runs west into the town centre and eastwards towards the villages of Røbekk, Hjelset, and Kleive and then on to Gjemnes Municipality, and Norwegian County Road 64, which runs north towards the Tussen Tunnel and south towards the Fannefjord Tunnel.
