= Årø =

Årø may refer to:

== Places ==
- Årø (Denmark), an island off Jutland, Denmark
- Årø, Norway, a neighborhood in the town of Molde in Møre og Romsdal, Norway
- Molde Airport, Årø, an airport in Molde, Norway

== See also ==
- Aro (disambiguation)
