= Aro (surname) =

Aro is a Finnish surname. Notable people with the surname include:

- Carlos Aro (1939–2017), Argentine boxer
- Elizabeth Aro (born 1961), Argentine artist
- Johan Emil Aro (1874–1928), Finnish entomologist
- Jori Aro, Finnish curler
- Markku Aro (born 1950), Finnish singer
- Samuli Aro (born 1975), Finnish enduro rider
- Toivo Aro (1887–1962), Finnish diver
- Hasse Aro (born 1957), Swedish television host and producer
