= Gegan =

Gegan is a surname. Notable people with this surname include:

- James Gegan Miller (born 1942), American physicist, engineer, and inventor
- Judy Gegan (born 1944), British swimmer
- Walter Gegan (1899–1931), American middle-distance runner

== See also ==
- The Gegan, the islet near Seacliff Harbour, North Berwick, Scotland
- Nicholas McGegan (born 1950), British harpsichordist, flutist, conductor and early music expert
- Gehan
