= Kleive Church =

Church in Møre og Romsdal, Norway

- Kleive kyrkje
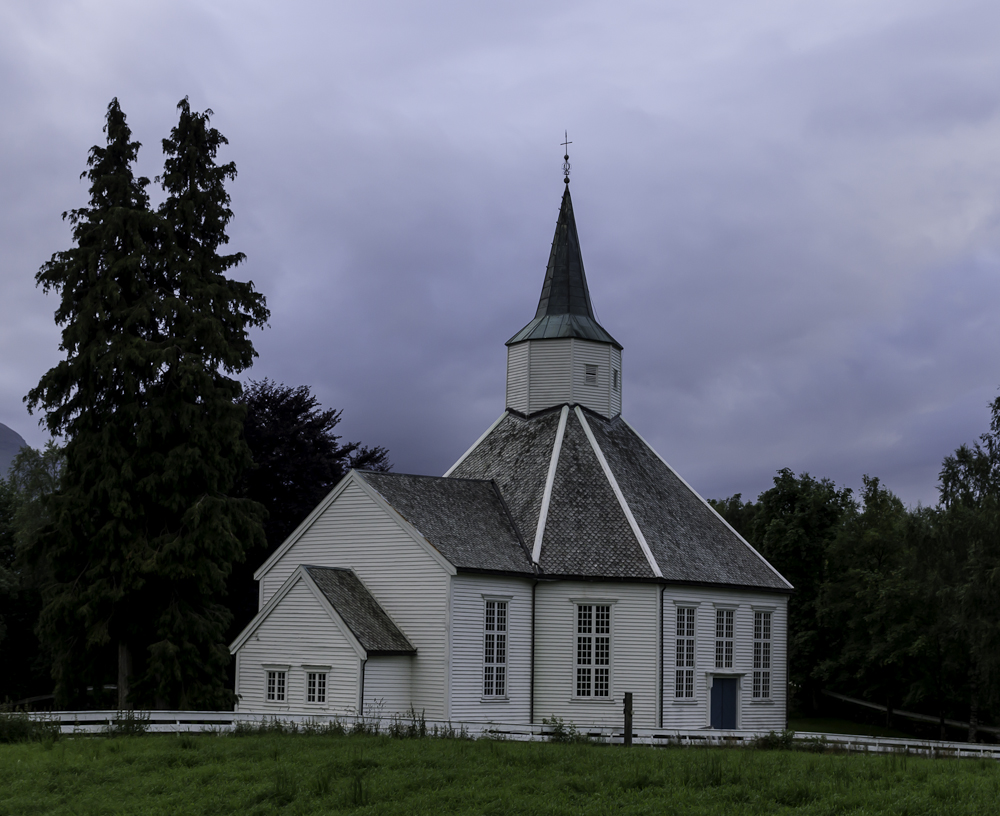
- View of the church
- Kleive Church
- 62°47′57″N 7°39′18″E
- Location: Molde Municipality, Møre og Romsdal
- Country: Norway
- Denomination: Church of Norway
- Churchmanship: Evangelical Lutheran

History
- Status: Parish church
- Founded: 14th century
- Consecrated: 20 August 1858

Architecture
- Functional status: Active
- Architectural type: Octagonal
- Style: Empire style
- Completed: 1858 (168 years ago)

Specifications
- Capacity: 270
- Materials: Wood

Administration
- Diocese: Møre bispedømme
- Deanery: Molde domprosti
- Parish: Kleive
- Norwegian Cultural Heritage Site
- Type: Church
- Status: Listed
- ID: 84790

Kleive Church (Norwegian: Kleive kyrkje) is a parish church of the Church of Norway in Molde Municipality in Møre og Romsdal county, Norway. It is located in the village of Kleive, at the eastern end of the Fannefjorden. It is the church for the Kleive parish which is part of the Molde domprosti (arch-deanery) in the Diocese of Møre. The white, wooden church was built in an octagonal design in the Empire style in 1858 by an unknown architect. The church seats about 270 people.

== History ==
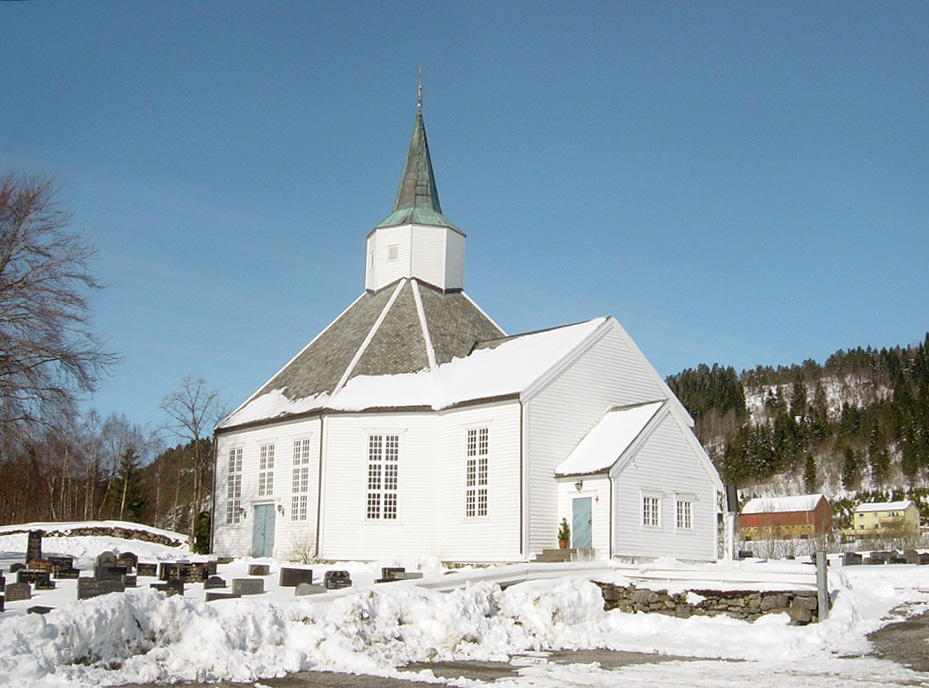
View of the church

The earliest existing historical records of the church date back to the year 1589, but the church was not new that year. The first church in Kleive was a stave church that was located a little to the southwest of the present-day building. The first church may have been constructed in the 14th century. The medieval church was repaired and renovated many times over the centuries, the final time was in 1682, but by then the church was in very poor condition that it was in danger of collapsing. In 1697, the old church was torn down and a new church was constructed to replace it. The new building was a wooden, cruciform building.

In 1814, this church served as an election church (Norwegian: valgkirke). Together with more than 300 other parish churches across Norway, it was a polling station for elections to the 1814 Norwegian Constituent Assembly which wrote the Constitution of Norway. This was Norway's first national elections. Each church parish was a constituency that elected people called "electors" who later met together in each county to elect the representatives for the assembly that was to meet at Eidsvoll Manor later that year.

In 1857, that cruciform church was torn down because it was getting too small for the parish. A new church was constructed in 1857-1858 by an unknown architect, although there is some evidence that it could have been Christian H. Grosch. The church was built in an Empire style with an octagonal design. There is a rectangular church porch on the west end of the octagonal nave and a choir and sacristy on the east end of the building. There is a tower on the roof above the centre of the octagonal nave. The new building was consecrated on 20 August 1858.

== See also ==
- List of churches in Møre
