= Kotkin =

Kotkin is a surname. Notable people with the surname include:

- David Copperfield (born in 1956 as David Seth Kotkin), American magician
- Joel Kotkin (born 1952), American demographer
- Sergey Kotkin (born 1956), Russian politician
- Stephen Kotkin (born 1959), American historian, academic, and author

== See also ==
- Kotin
