= Afong =

Afong is a given name and surname. Notable people with the name include:

- Afong Moy (fl. 1834–1850), first known female Chinese immigrant to the United States
- Chun Afong (c. 1825–1906), Chinese businessman
- Julia Fayerweather Afong (1840–1919), Hawaiian high chiefess
