= Afong Moy =

First female Chinese immigrant to the U.S.

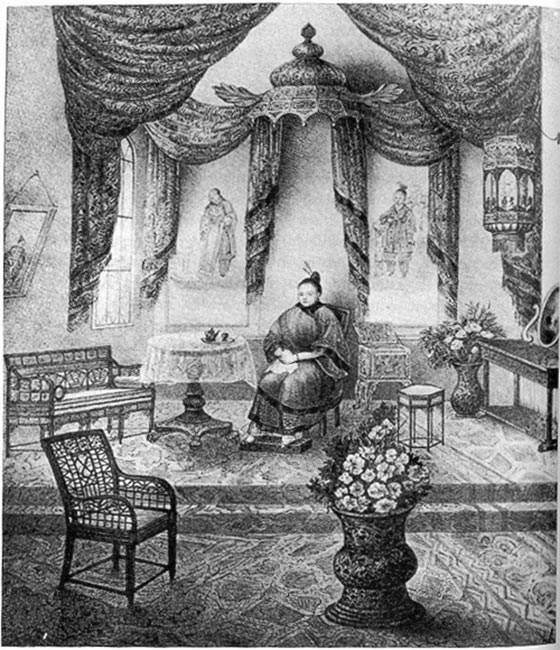
- Afong Moy, exhibited among "various Chinese curiosities"
- Born: c. 1815 – c. 1820; Guangzhou (Canton City), China
- Died: Unknown
- Known for: First female Chinese immigrant to the United States
- Height: 4 ft 10 in (147 cm)

Afong Moy was the first known female Chinese immigrant to the United States. In 1834, Moy was brought from her hometown of Guangzhou to New York City by traders Nathaniel and Frederick Carne, and exhibited as "The Chinese Lady". Announcements of her exhibitions advertised her clothing, her language, and her four-inch "little feet", a result of foot binding.

Moy was the first Chinese woman to achieve fame throughout the U.S. She toured the United States, was given press coverage, and met U.S. President Andrew Jackson. In 1835, the New York firm Risso and Browne published a lithograph of Moy, titled "The Chinese Lady".

However, Moy's popularity waned in the 1840s and records of her disappeared in 1850. Moy was not mentioned again in the newspapers and it is unclear what became of her. Moy was the first Chinese woman that many Americans interacted with, and influenced their perceptions of Asian women and Chinese culture.

== Early life ==
Afong Moy came from Canton City, China (now known as Guangzhou). She was reported to be the daughter of a "distinguished citizen", suggesting her parents had higher socio-economic status. Her father reportedly lived "in the suburbs of Canton".

== Journey to the United States ==
In 1760, the Qianlong Emperor adopted a closed border policy in response to the increasing influence of Westerners in China. This policy was in effect until the mid-1800s, and meant that Westerners were only allowed to set foot on the southern port of Canton.

While it is not clear how Moy was able to leave China and find her way to the U.S., her journey is widely attributed to two American merchants, the brothers Nathaniel and Frederic Carne. In the early 1800s, the Carne brothers worked with ship captain B. T. Obear to start a new business and draw further attention to Chinese goods in New York. Debating on a means to elevate their business, the Carne brothers concluded that exhibiting a Chinese woman in New York among a decor of Chinese furnishings would be an effective marketing strategy. They hoped that interacting with an exotic Chinese woman would lead Westerners to develop a fascination with Chinese goods.

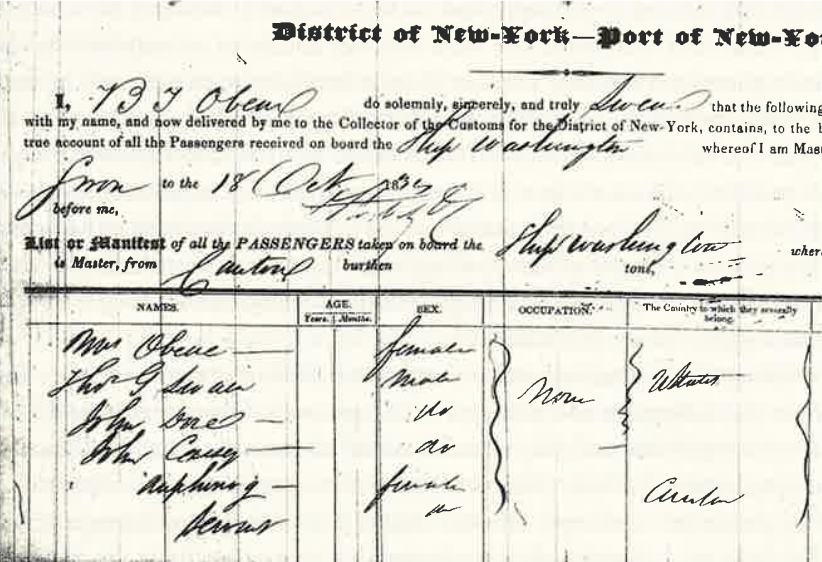
The ship manifest for the Washington listed "Auphinoy" or "Auphmoy" from Canton.

It is believed that through newspapers and promotional materials, Captain Obear contacted Moy's father, and succeeded in reaching an agreement to bring Moy to the U.S. Some sources suggest that Moy was the daughter of a privileged family, and that her father accepted payments for her temporary move to the United States. Other sources hint that she had left China to earn money to send back to her parents in Guangzhou, who were unable to support her. Obear promised to return Moy on his next voyage to Canton in two years (however, Captain Obear re-embarked to Canton in April 1835, and Moy did not accompany him). On October 17, 1834, Moy arrived in the United States aboard Captain Obear's ship, the Washington. She was listed on the passenger list as "Auphinoy"/"Auphmoy".

Upon her arrival in New York, Moy was identified by local newspapers as "Julia Foochee ching-chang king", the daughter of "Hong wang-tzang tzee-king"; "Miss Ching-Chang-foo"; "Miss Keo-O-Kwang King"; and other variations. It was after her arrival to the United States that she adopted the name Afong Moy, possibly on the request of the Carne brothers. This may have been a romanization of a nickname with the Chinese prefix a- (阿). Initially, Moy could not speak English, but could communicate effectively through her interpreter, a Chinese man named "Atung" or "Acong".

=== Experience in the United States ===
==== Early years and fame ====
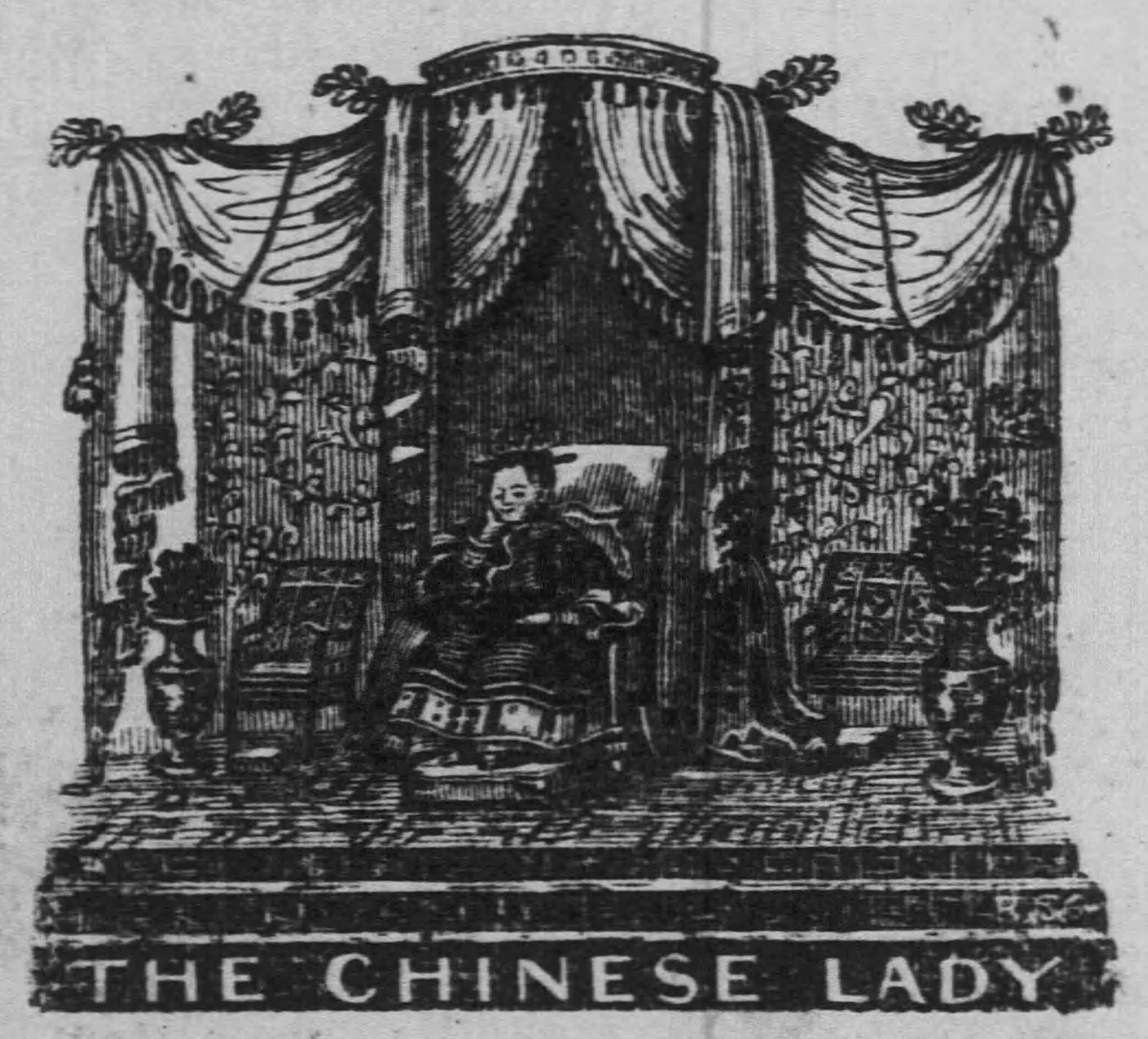
Afong Moy as depicted in an 1835 advertisement in The Charleston Mercury

On November 6, 1834, Moy gave her first performance at an exhibition hall at No. 8 Park Palace, and advertisements of her performance soon began to appear in local newspapers. These advertisements described Moy as 19 years of age, 4 feet 10 inches in height, "dressed in her national costume", with feet that were "but four inches in length". One paper advertised Moy as a Chinese lady "in native costume who showed New York belles how different ladies could look in widely separated regions". From November 10 onwards, Moy was exhibited to the general public between 10 am and 2 pm, and then again from 5 pm to 9 pm, for the price of 50 cents. She would sit upon a throne of "rich and costly materials" in a Chinese setting, the centerpiece of a room of Chinese furnishings, handicrafts, and decorative objects. On stage, she would use chopsticks, explain Chinese social practices, and sing traditional Chinese songs. She would sometimes display her bound feet by elevating them on a cushion or walking around the room. She performed at various venues in 1834, including the American Museum, Peale's Museum, and the Brooklyn Institute.

Evidence suggests that Moy's opinions were respected in her exhibitions, and that Moy had the agency to reject audience requests.

As her exhibition in New York gained fame, Moy embarked on a trip across the United States, visiting major cities including New Haven, Philadelphia, Washington, Baltimore, Richmond, Norfolk, Charleston, New Orleans, and Boston. In March 1835, she performed in Washington for an entire month, where her exhibition was hailed as an "unprecedented novelty". In Washington, Moy met U.S. President Andrew Jackson in early March. The New York firm Risso and Browne published a lithograph of her, titled "The Chinese Lady".

In 1836, an advertisement in The Evening Post said that Moy had visited "nearly every City in the Union" and was returning to New York to "say farewell" before returning to China. By this point she could speak some English. An advertisement in The Pittsburgh Gazette said that she intended to return to China soon on the Mary Ballard. But in December, she was still in the United States; supposedly she had not been able to find a ship back to China, but more likely the claimed plans for departure were just an advertising tactic to increase ticket sales. She reappeared in New York in April 1837, as advertised in The Long-Island Star, which said again that she planned to return to China soon. She is not mentioned again until the following year.

==== Decline ====
In April 1838, the media reported that Moy was faced with financial difficulties. Rumors were circulated that she had been discarded in New Jersey by her guardians, who had "stolen" her from China and feared prosecution if they brought her back. Descriptions of her situation were distressing to the extent that local residents considered financing her return to China. Moy's guardian, Caleb E. Taylor, rebuked these claims, although Moy did not continue to put on exhibitions.

Following press coverage of Moy's situation, the authorities of Monmouth County, New Jersey, boarded her in the local poorhouse at public expense. She remained there until sometime before April 1848, when "a company of persons redeemed her, by defraying the expenses of her maintenance and giving security for the future". Moy's removal from the poorhouse was intended to return her to the exhibition hall. In 1847, the public were once again able to attend her shows.

After more shows in New York, Boston, and Philadelphia, Moy performed at a venue on Pennsylvania Avenue, Washington, D.C., in November 1849. In this performance, her name was advertised as Afong Moy Nanchoy, suggesting that she had been married, possibly to a man who was also of Cantonese origin. Her last recorded exhibition was in the New York City Hotel in April 1850. Following this performance, records of Moy completely disappear. Some sources suggest that she had left the United States to tour Europe.

== Image and appearance ==
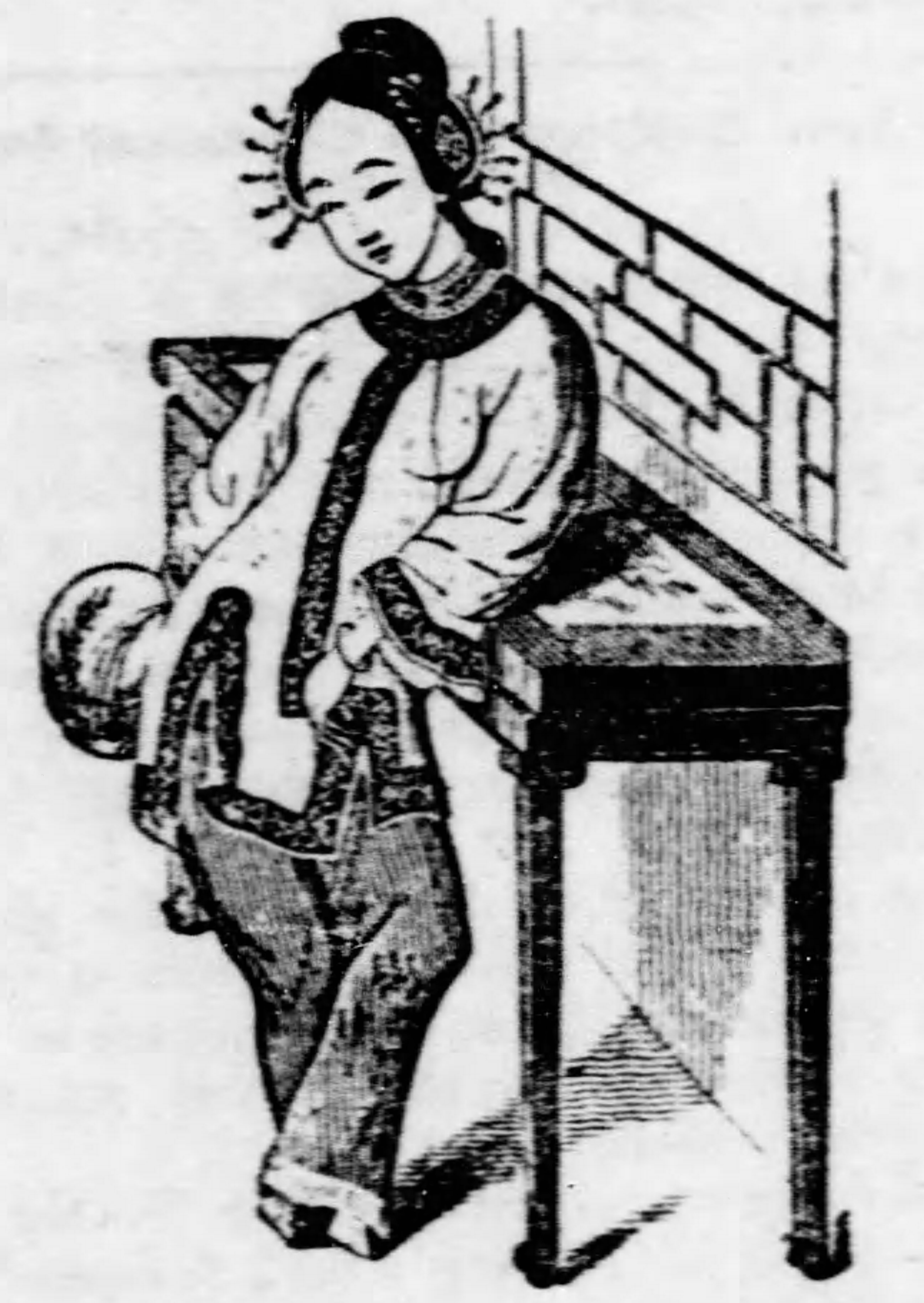
Moy as depicted in an advertisement in The Pittsburgh Gazette in 1836

The New-York Commercial Advertiser described Moy as a "healthy, bouncing girl", with a "complexion tinged with copper but sufficiently transparent, revealing that roses are blooming beneath her skin". She wore a costume befitting a lady "of her rank"—wherever she appeared in public, she would dress in Chinese attire. During her first days in the United States, Moy mainly wore a mantle of blue silk with pantalets of yellow silk. In her later displays, Moy was said to dress in "her native costume, composed of [the] most superb Chinese Embroidery". In 1847, her dress was said to be beautiful, elaborate, and expensive, with satin, lace, and gold embroidery.

Moy spent long hours perfecting her appearance each day. She was said to spend her time either "at her toilet, or at her tambour". She was known to spend four to five hours at her toilette.

Moy had undergone the process of foot binding as a child, and her feet were said to measure 4.75 inches (121 mm) from the heel to the end of the great toe, 2.125 inches (54 mm) from the heel to the end of the small toe, and 6.60 inches (168 mm) around the ankle. Several physicians examined Moy's bound feet and published their findings in newspapers.

== Legacy ==
=== Influence on Western perceptions of China and Chinese women ===
Moy's influence and regular interaction with the American public provided her a platform to counter particular stereotypes of Chinese women, even as she struggled for her survival in the United States. Scholars have argued that Moy blurred the lines between the dominant "Lotus Blossom" and "Dragon Lady" stereotypes of Asian women. Moy had the amiability of a "Lotus Blossom", yet she demonstrated the resolve and determination of a "Dragon Lady".

Moy's experience with American society has also been interpreted as an expression of America's mentality towards Chinese residents before Chinese exclusion engulfed the country, as a predecessor to the segregated treatment of the Chinese. Americans looked down upon the Chinese practice of foot-binding for women, and Moy's exhibitions led some Americans to decry China as culturally backward.

=== In literature ===
Playwright Lloyd Suh wrote a two-person play, The Chinese Lady, featuring Moy and her assistant Atung, The play premiered in July 2018 at the St. Germain Stage, Pittsfield, MA. Since then it has been produced in many other venues from coast to coast.

Jamie Ford's 2022 novel The Many Daughters of Afong Moy follows seven generations of Chinese women, including a fictionalized version of Moy.

== See also ==
- Chinese American history
- Chinese emigration
- Titia Bergsma, first European woman to visit Japan, who attracted intense interest

== Bibliography and further reading ==
- Bonner, Arthur. Alas! What Brought Thee Hither? The Chinese in New York, 1800-1950. Fairleigh Dickinson University Press, 1997. Print.
- Carpenter, Cari M., and K. Hyoejin Yoon. "Rethinking Alternative Contact in Native American and Chinese Encounters: Juxtaposition in Nineteenth-Century US Newspapers." College Literature, vol. 2014, no. 1, 2014, pp. 7–42., doi:10.1353/lit.2014.0008.
- Cheng, Anne Anlin. "Yellow Skin, White Gold." IDEAS Journal, Jan 2020. https://aaa.org.hk/en/ideas/ideas/yellow-skin-white-gold
- Davis, Nancy E. "The Chinese Lady: Afong Moy in early America", Oxford University Press, 2019.
- Haddad, John. The Chinese Lady and China for the Ladies - CHSA. www.chsa.org/wp-content/uploads/2012/01/2011HP_02_Haddad.pdf.
- Lee, Lily Xiao Hong, et al. "Biographical Dictionary of Chinese Women: v. 1: The Qing Period, 1644-1911." Taylor & Francis, Routledge, 17 July 2015, www.taylorfrancis.com/books/9781317475880.
- Mao, LuMing, and Morris Young. Representations: Doing Asian American Rhetoric. Utah State University Press, 2008. Print.
- Moon, Kystyn. Yellowface: Creating the Chinese in American Popular Music and Performance, 1850s-1920s. Rutgers UP, 2006, ACLS Humanities E-Book, .
- Moy, James S. Marginal Sights: Staging the Chinese in America. University of Iowa, 1996. Print.
- Yoshihara, Mari. "John Rogers Haddad. The Romance of China: Excursions to China in U.S. Culture, 1776–1876.Gutenberg-e. New York: Columbia University Press. 2008. pp. Xxii, 321. $60.00." The American Historical Review, vol. 114, no. 4, 2009, pp. 1080–1081., doi:10.1086/ahr.114.4.1080.
- Zhang, Tao. "The Start of American Accommodation of the Chinese: Afong Moys Experience from 1834 to 1850." Journal of American Studies, vol. 49, no. 03, 2014, pp. 475–503., doi:10.1017/s0021875814001819.
