= Aero =

Aero is a Greek prefix relating to flight and air. In British English, it is used as an adjective related to flight (e.g., as a shortened substitute for aeroplane).

Aero, Ærø, or Aeros may refer to:

== Aeronautics ==
=== Airlines and companies ===
- Aero (American airline), an American airline operating public charter flights
- Aero (Polish airline), a Polish airline founded in 1925 which later was merged into LOT
- Aero Airlines, an Estonian airline owned by Finnair
- Aero Commander, formerly known as Aero, a division of Rockwell International
- Aero Cóndor, an airline based in Lima, Peru
- Aero Contractors (Nigeria), a scheduled airline from Nigeria
- Aero Contractors (United States), private charter company based in Smithfield, North Carolina
- Aero O/Y, former name of Finnair
- Aero Vodochody, a Czech aircraft manufacturer founded in 1919
- Aerocondor, Portuguese airline
- Aeroflot, the flag carrier of the Russian Federation
- Aerolíneas Argentinas, the flag carrier airline of Argentina
- Aeroméxico, the flag carrier airline of Mexico
- Aeroperú, a Peruvian airline
- Aeropostal Alas de Venezuela, an airline based in Caracas in Venezuela
- Aéropostale (aviation), a French aviation company
- Gulfstream Aerospace, an American subsidiary of General Dynamics
- Figeac Aero, French aeronautical equipment manufacturer.

=== Equipment ===
- Aero engine or aircraft engine
- AeroMobil, a Slovak prototype roadable aircraft
- Aeroplane, an alternate spelling of airplane

=== Other aeronautics ===
- AERO Friedrichshafen, an annual German airshow
- Aerodynamics
- Aerospace engineering

== Arts, entertainment, and media ==
=== Music ===
- Aero (rapper), French rapper part of the French hip hop duo PSO Thug
- AERO, a 2004 album by Jean-Michel Jarre
- Aero - Tribute to the Wind, a 2002 concert by Jean Michel Jarre at Aalborg, Denmark
- "Aerodynamic" (instrumental), by Daft Punk
- Aerosmith, an American rock band

=== Other uses in arts, entertainment, and media ===
- Aerobiz, a video game
- Aero (Marvel Comics), a character in the Marvel Universe
- Aero (manhua), a Chinese manhua comic series about the Marvel character of the same name
- Aero the Acro-Bat, a game by Iguana Entertainment
  - Aero the Acro-Bat 2, a game sequel again starring Aero
- Melody Guthrie, also known as Aero, a character in the Marvel Universe
- An aerodactyl in the manga/comic Pokémon Adventures
- A character in the manga/comic 12 Beast
- Frutiger Aero, a design and user interface style

== Computing and technology ==
- .aero, an Internet top-level domain
- Aerohive Networks, an American multinational computer networking equipment company
- Compaq Aero, a PDA (Personal Digital Assistant)
- Dell Aero, the first smartphone from Dell
- Nokia Aero, concept-phone by Nokia
- Windows Aero, a user interface in Windows Vista and Windows 7

== Food ==
- Aero (chocolate bar), a chocolate bar created by Rowntrees and now made by Nestlé
- Aero Biscuits, a biscuit bar made by Nestlé, based on their chocolate bar

== Motor vehicles ==
=== Automobiles and motorcycles ===
- Aero (automobile), a Czechoslovak automobile company
- Aero Minor, a Czechoslovak automobile manufactured by Aero company
- Aero (motorcycle), a 1920s Japanese bike built by Narazo Shamazu
- Aeros, high-performance versions of cars from Saab Automobile
- SSC Aero, a mid-engine sports car by Shelby Super Cars
- Willys Aero, a line of passenger cars manufactured from 1952 to 1971

=== Buses and monorails ===
- Aerobus, a form of transport which uses a non-typical monorail system on a cable system, similar to the one used by suspension bridges
- Hyundai Aero, a bus built by the Hyundai Motor Company
- Mitsubishi Fuso Aero Bus series

== Other uses ==
- Ærø, Danish island
- Aero (color), a shade of Air Force blue
- Aero (mythology), princess of Chios, Greece
- Akron Aeros, former name of Akron RubberDucks, a Minor League Baseball team in Akron, Ohio, U.S.

== See also ==
- Aereo, TV service, now defunct
- Aéropostale (clothing), a US clothing store
