= Gehan =

Gehan is a name. Notable people with this name include:

- Gehan Dassanayake, Sri Lankan cricket player
- Gehan Mendis (born 1955), English cricket player
- George H. Gehan (1901-1968), American lawyer and politician
- Mark H. Gehan (1892-1967), American lawyer and politician
- Rodney Gehan (1942–2001), Australian cricket player
