= Langfjord Tunnel =

Proposed subsea tunnel in Møre og Romsdal, Norway

Coordinates: 62°40′N 007°29′E

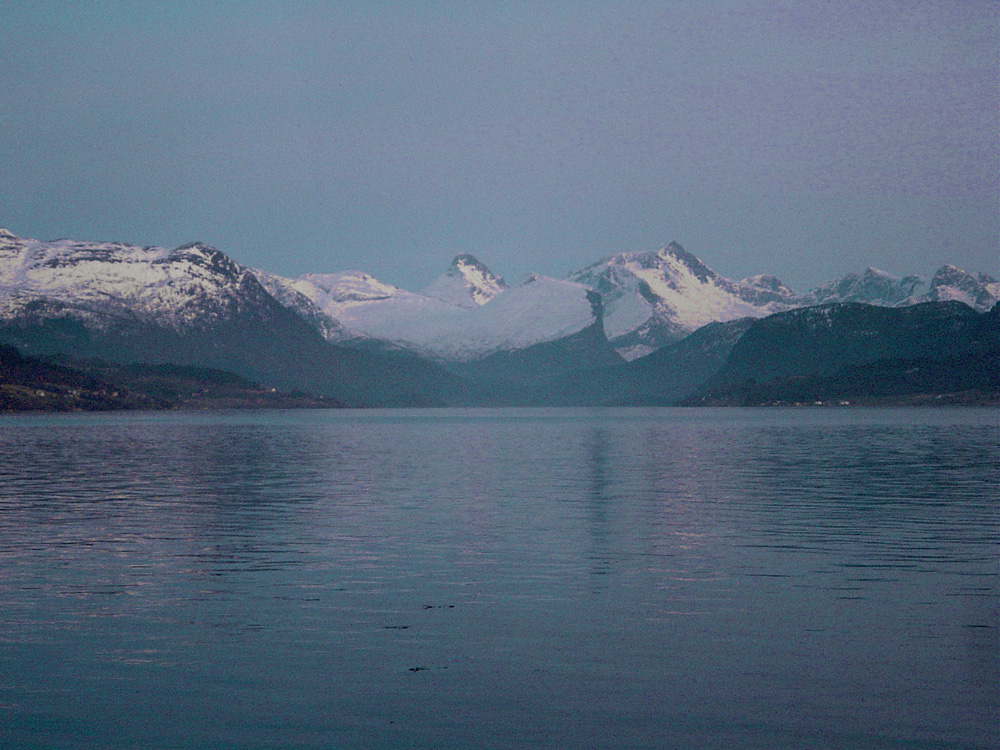
Langfjorden as seen from the ferry quay at Sølsnes

The Langfjord Tunnel is a proposed subsea road tunnel which would cross Langfjorden between Molde Municipality and Rauma Municipality in Møre og Romsdal county, Norway. It may also be built with a branch to the island of Sekken. As part of County Road 64, the tunnel would replace the Åfarnes–Sølsnes Ferry, and allow ferry-free access across the Romsdalsfjorden to Eastern Norway, as well as connect Molde and Rauma. If the branch is built, it would replace the Molde–Sekken Ferry, giving the island a fixed link. The main tunnel would be between 10 and 11 kilometers (6.2 and 6.8 mi) long, which the branch would be slightly shorter than 5 kilometers (3.1 mi) long. The tunnel would reach 330 meters (1,080 ft) below mean sea level, making it the deepest subsea tunnel in the world. It would also be one of the longest subsea tunnels in Norway.

== History ==
The project was originally planned to be self-financed as a toll road, without receiving other state grants than the subsidies which would otherwise have been given to the ferry. However, new requirements changed increased the costs from 910 to 1,370 million Norwegian krone. The requirements included a less steep grading, which would result in a longer tunnel, and three instead of two lanes, to the uphill direction would have a passing lane. Møre og Romsdal County Municipality has prioritized the Langfjord Tunnel third, after the Nordøy Fixed Link and the Trollheim Tunnel. Should the Langfjord Tunnel need public grants, with today's funding level money would not be allocated until the late 2020s. In November 2010, figures from the newly opened Eiksund Tunnel and Atlantic Ocean Tunnel showed an increase of 110% in traffic, compared to the 20% estimate for the Langfjord Tunnel. The new tunnels had an estimated increase of 30% and 60%, respectively. This will result in more tolls, which can handle the increased traffic. However, the county municipality would have to guarantee for this number; should the increased traffic fall short, the county municipality would have to pay the deficit. A public guarantee would also decrease the average interest rate from 6.5% to 5.0%. Should the tunnel not be built, a second ferry will have to be used, which will increase the need for subsidies for the ferry route. This will increase the income for the toll road, as they receive the money which would otherwise be used for the ferry. Should the changes be approved, sufficient funding would be secured for financing the project.
