= Norwegian County Road 64 =

Road in Norway

County Road 64

Route information
- Length: 126.7 km (78.7 mi)

Major junctions
- North end: Fv64 in Kristiansund
- E39 in Årø
- South end: E136 in Åndalsnes

Location
- Country: Norway
- Counties: Møre og Romsdal
- Major cities: Kristiansund, Molde, Åndalsnes

Highway system
- Roads in Norway; National Roads; County Roads
← Fv63	→ Fv65

County Road 64 (Norwegian: Fylkesvei 64) is a 126.2-kilometre (78.4 mi) two-lane highway which runs between the towns of Kristiansund and Åndalsnes in Møre og Romsdal county, Norway. It branches from National Road 70 in Kristiansund, runs through the Atlantic Ocean Tunnel, across the island of Averøya, and across the Atlantic Ocean Road to Eide Municipality. It continues to Årø in Molde Municipality via the Tussen Tunnel, then heads under Fannefjorden in the Fannefjord Tunnel, across the island of Bolsøya then over the Bolsøy Bridge to the Skåla Peninsula. It then crosses Langfjorden on the Åfarnes–Sølsnes Ferry, and enters Rauma Municipality. It intersects with the European route E136 highway in the town of Åndalsnes.

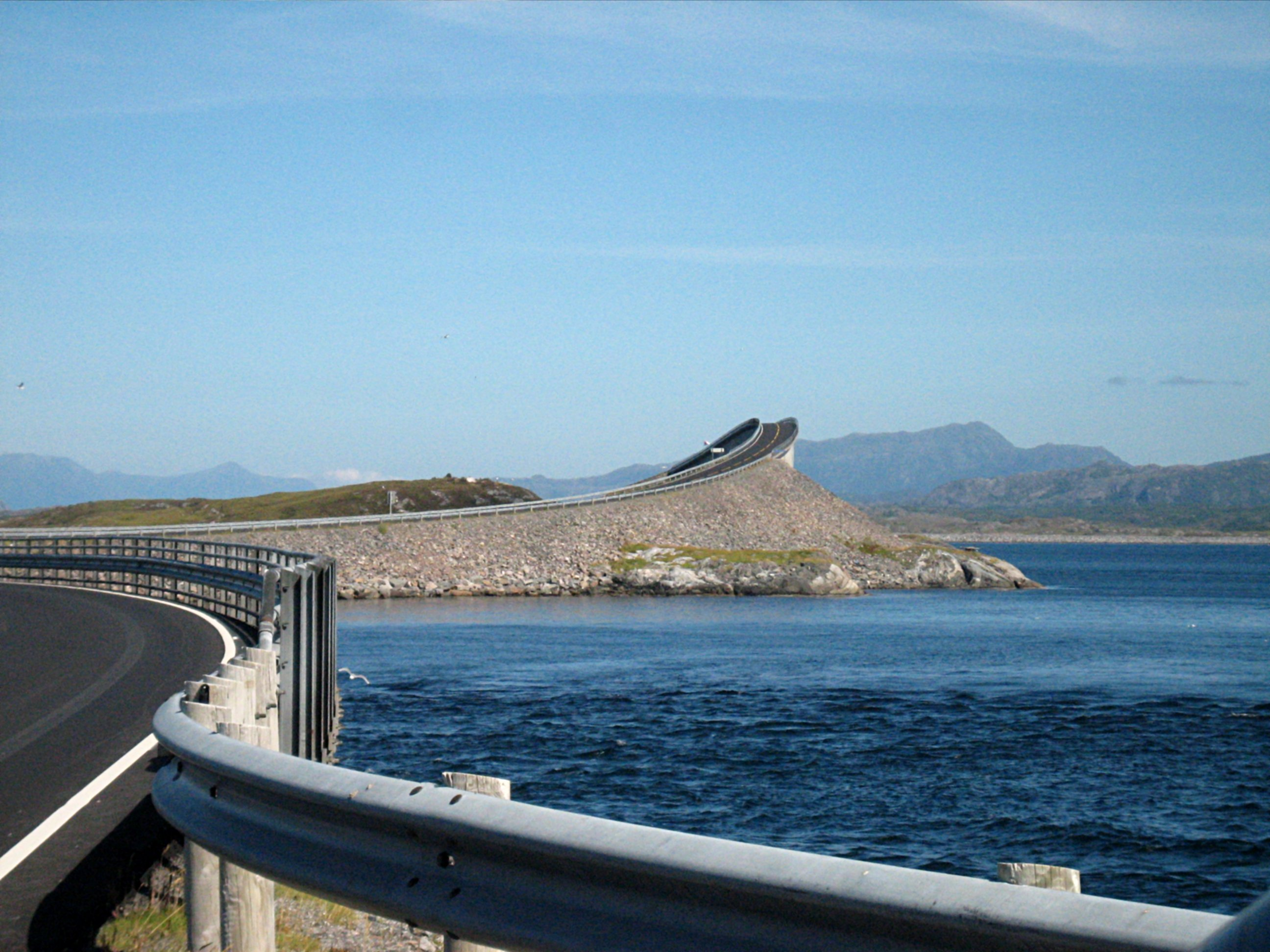
One of many bridges on the Atlantic Ocean Road

The Atlantic Ocean Road was in 2006 described as "the world's best road trip" by The Guardian. There are plans for a subsea tunnel, the Langfjord Tunnel, to replace the ferry.
