= Rodney Gehan =

Australian cricketer

Personal information
- Born: 12 November 1942; Werribee, Victoria, Australia
- Died: 8 February 2001 (aged 58); Hope Island, Queensland
- Source: Cricinfo, 18 February 2020

Rodney Gehan (12 November 1942 – 8 February 2001) was an Australian cricketer. He played in one first-class match for South Australia in 1962/63.

== See also ==
- List of South Australian representative cricketers
