= Trollheim Tunnel =

Proposed road tunnel in Norway

Coordinates: 62.804°N 8.59°E

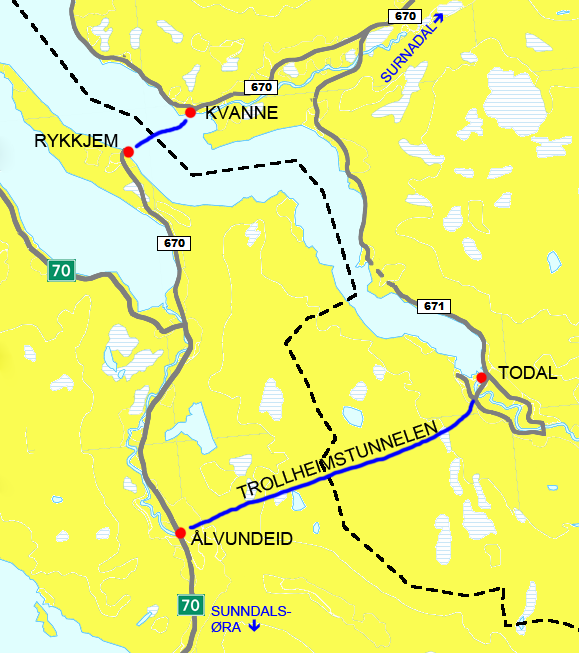
Map of the Trollheim Tunnel

The Trollheim Tunnel (Norwegian: Trollheimstunnelen) is a proposed road tunnel which would run 9.15 kilometers (5.69 mi) from Ålvundeidet to Todalsøra, connecting Sunndal Municipality and Surnadal Municipality. The tunnel would be built as a toll road, and make it possible to close the Kvanne–Rykkjem Ferry. As of 2009, the estimated cost of the project was 925 million Norwegian krone, which would have to be partially financed by Møre og Romsdal County Municipality. In 2021, the county municipality still is considering the project with no formal approval at that point.
