= Åros =

Village in Buskerud, Norway

Coordinates: 59°42′19″N 10°30′25″E

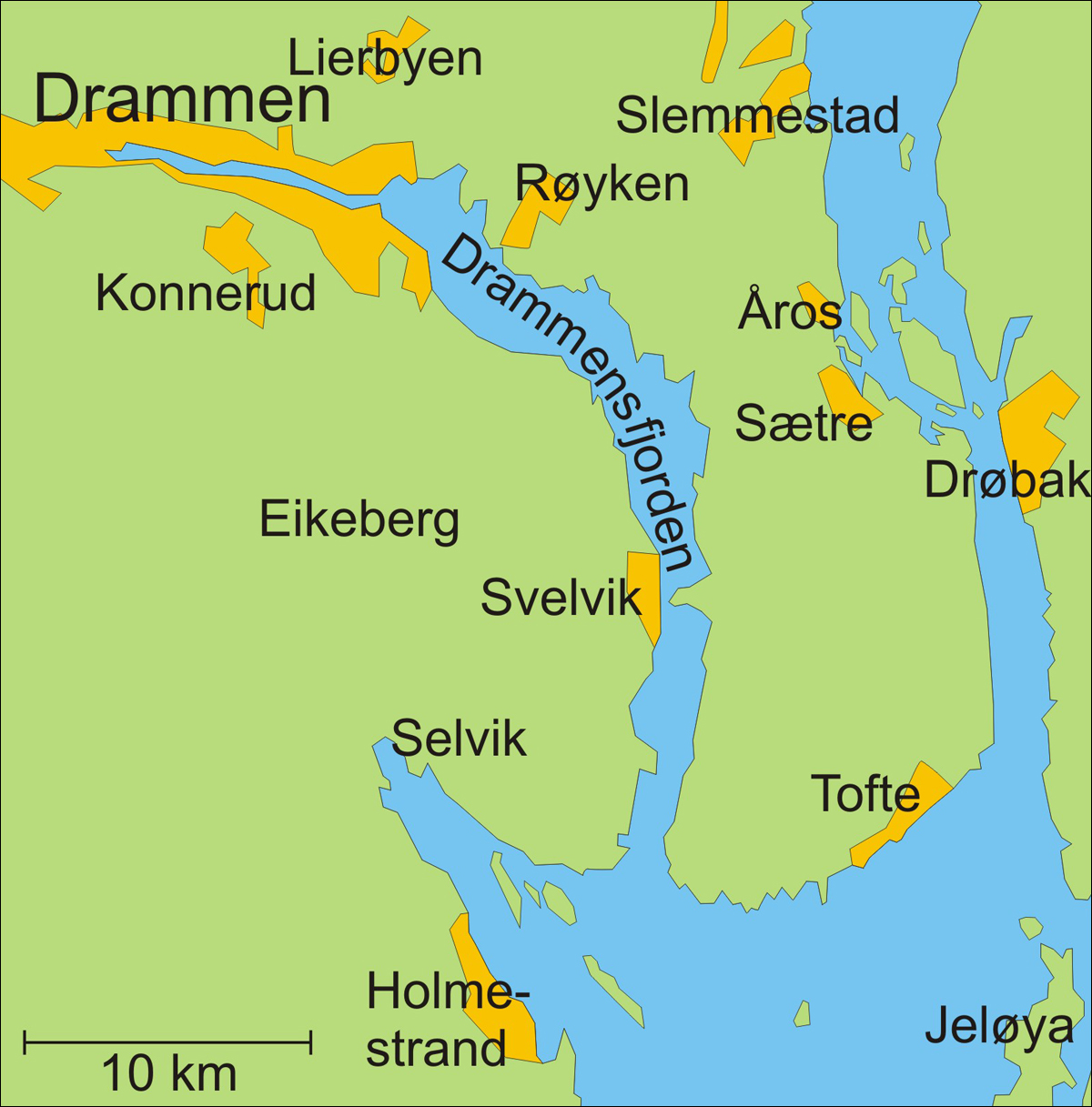
Åros on the western side of the Oslofjord

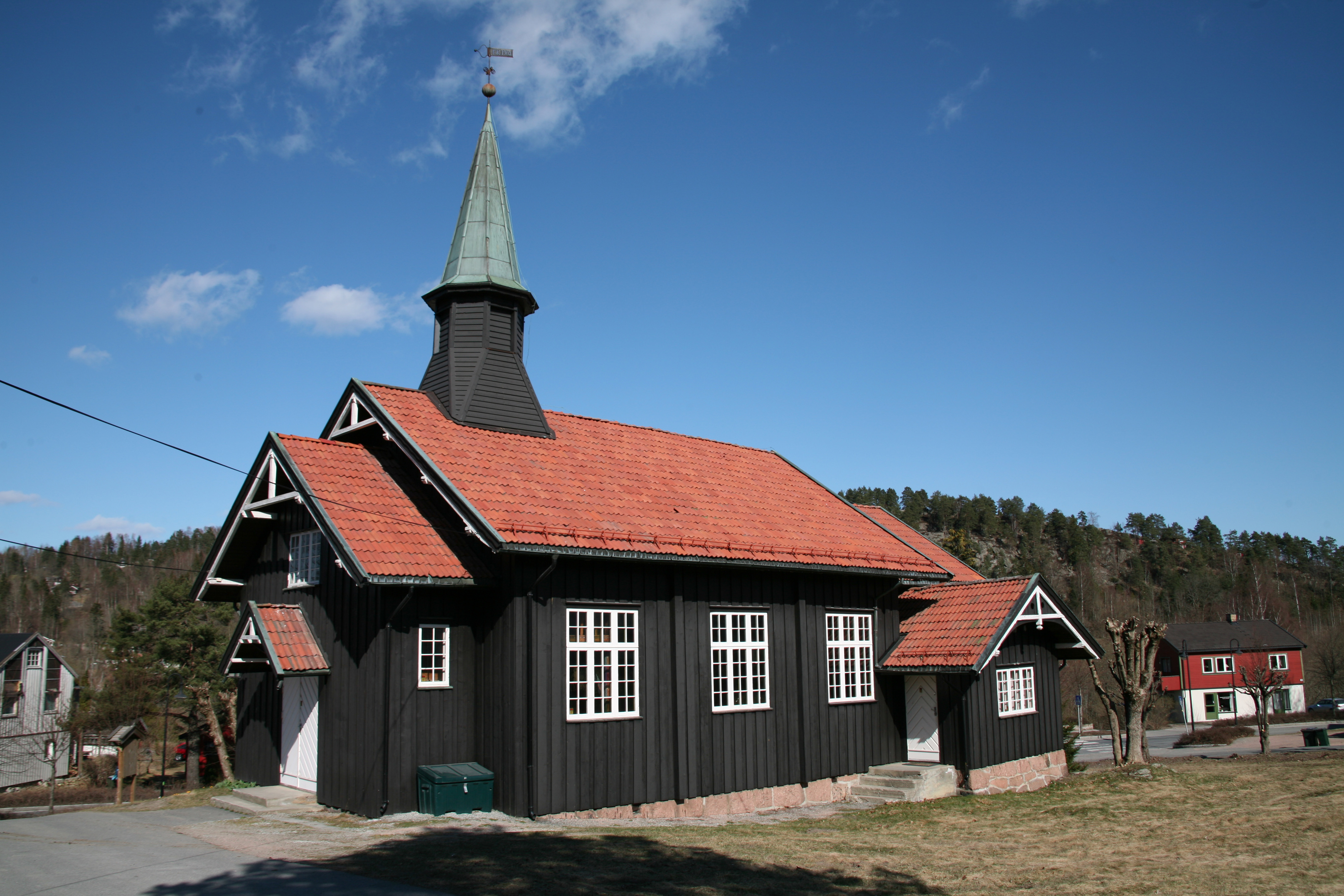
Åros Church

Åros is a village in Røyken in Asker municipality in Akershus county, Norway. The population of Åros (2020) is about 2137.

== Location ==
Åros is located on the peninsula of Hurumlandet along the western side of the Oslofjord. The river Åroselva, which has long been a reliable source of power for sawmills, runs through the village. Åros is situated north of the village of Sætre, about 40 km south of Oslo and 25 km southeast of Drammen. Norwegian County Road 11 (Fylkesvei 11) runs through Åros from Krokodden to Sætre. The closest railway station is located at Røyken.

== Åros Church ==
Åros is the location of Åros Church (Åros kirke) which dates from 1903. The chapel is constructed of wood after plans drawn by architect Alfred Christian Dahl. The building has a rectangular nave and 150 seats. Between 1963 and 1965, major improvements were implemented on the church. It is associated with the Diocese of Tunsberg, with the Church of Norway.
