= Aero (motorcycle) =

Motorcycle built by Narazo Shamazu

- Manufacturer: Narazo Shamazu
- Production: 1925–1927
- Class: Motorcycle
- Engine: 250 cc, 633 cc single-cylinder

The Aero was a motorcycle created by Narazo Shamazu, who had built motorcycles under the NS name prior to World War I. Manufactured between 1925 and 1927, the Aero featured 250 cc and 633 cc single-cylinder engines.
