= Gabensis =

- Village
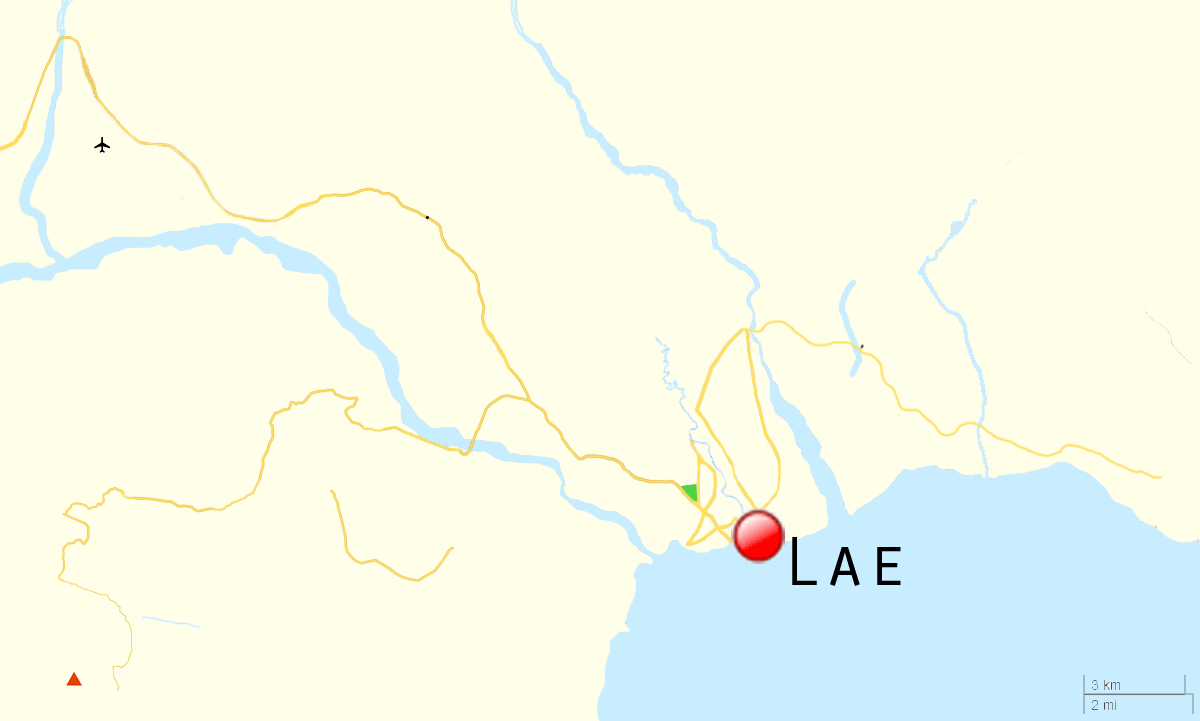
- Location in the Lae area
- Coordinates: 6°43′S 146°46′E
- Country: Papua New Guinea
- Province: Morobe Province
- LLG: Wampar Rural LLG

Population (1999)
  - Total: 1,700
- Time zone: UTC+10 (AEST)
- Climate: Af

Gabensis is a village in Wampar Rural LLG, Morobe Province, Papua New Guinea. It lies to the north-west of Lae, 11.7 kilometres (7.3 mi) from Oomsis. In 1999 it had a population of about 1700 people. There is a stream flowing in the vicinity of the same name, Gabensis Creek.
