= Kotin =

Kotin is a surname. Notable people with the surname include:

- Albert Kotin (1907–1980), American artist
- Josef Kotin (1908–1979), Soviet constructor of tanks
- Nikita Kotin (born 2002), Russian footballer
- Vladimir Kotin (born 1962), Soviet figure skater
- Andrew Kotin (born 2001), American Baseball Player
