= Fannefjorden =

Fjord in Møre og Romsdal, Norway

- Fannen (historic)
- Interactive map of the fjord
- Location: Møre og Romsdal county, Norway
- Coordinates: 62.74°N 7.45°E
- Type: Fjord
- Basin countries: Norway
- Max. length: 20 kilometres (12 mi)
- Settlements: Molde

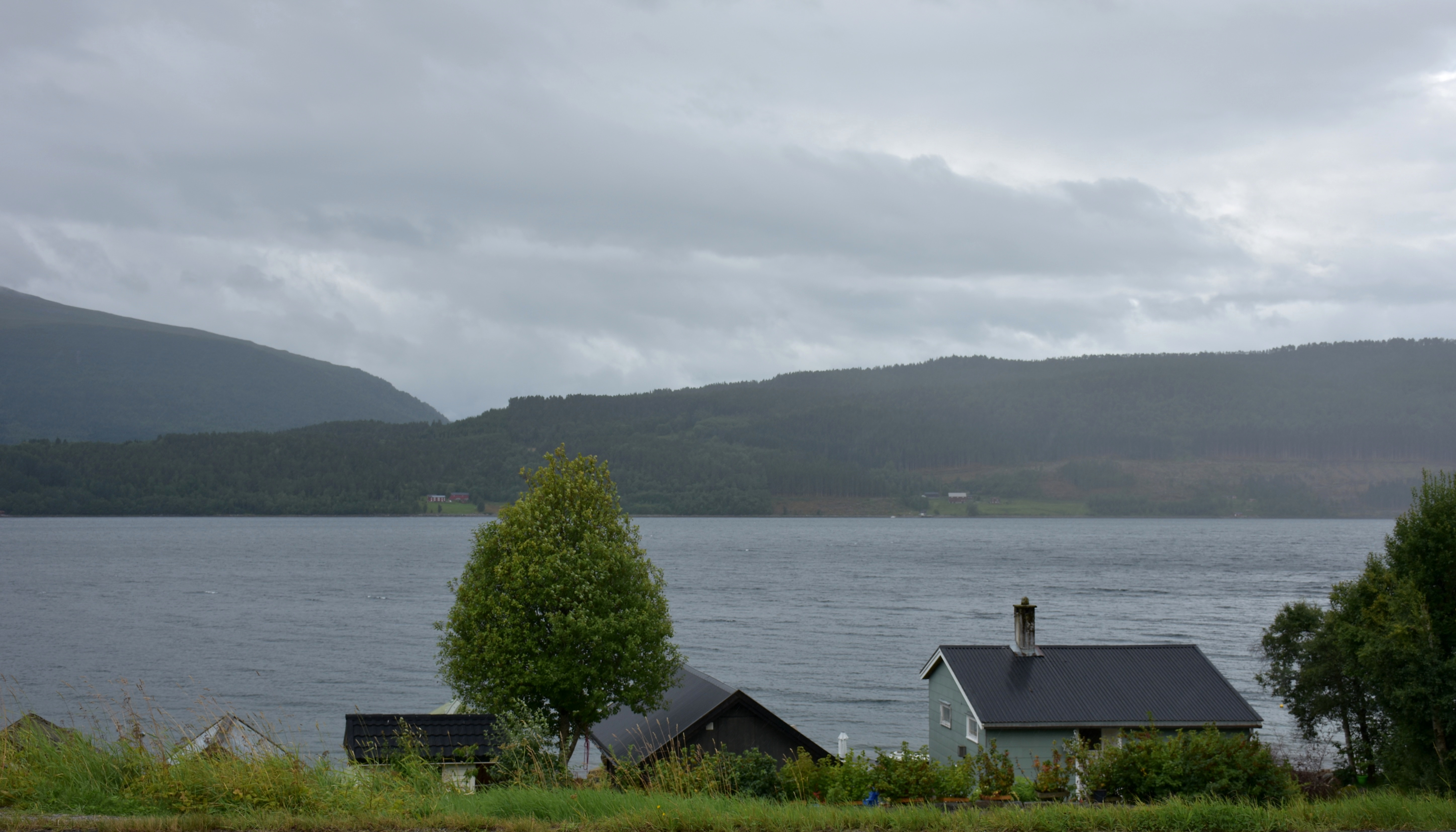
Fannefjorden in August 2018

Fannefjorden is a fjord located in Molde Municipality in Møre og Romsdal county, Norway. It is a 20-kilometre (12 mi) long extension of the Moldefjorden, running east–west near the south side of the Romsdal peninsula. The fjord begins just east of the city of Molde on the north shore with the island of Bolsøya on the south side. It is believed that "Fannefjorden" is very old name, and perhaps a name originally applied to the whole area.

European Route E39 runs along the north side of the fjord from the city of Molde to the village of Hjelset on the northern shore of the fjord, where the road turns northward. The village of Kleive is located near the end of the fjord. County Road 64 crosses under the fjord in the Fannefjord Tunnel.

== See also ==
- List of Norwegian fjords
