= George H. Gehan =

American politician (1901–1968)

George H. Gehan (January 14, 1901 – October 31, 1968) was an American lawyer and politician.

Gehan was born in Saint Paul, Minnesota, and practiced law in Saint Paul. He served in the Minnesota House of Representatives from 1929 to 1934.
