= Anne Anlin Cheng =

American scholar and writer

- Born: Taipei, Taiwan
- Education: Princeton University (BA); Stanford University (MA); University of California, Berkeley (PhD)
- Occupations: Professor of English and American Studies at Princeton University

Anne Anlin Cheng is an American literary scholar and cultural theorist, known for her extensive writings on the intersections of race, gender, aesthetics, American literature, psychoanalysis, Asian American studies, and Black studies. She is currently a Professor of English and American Studies at Princeton University.

== Early life and education ==
Cheng was born in Taipei, Taiwan, and immigrated to the United States at the age of twelve. Cheng has linked, in autobiographical writing, this early transition from Taiwan to the United States at age twelve as her sense of “unbelonging”. The family memory, mixing identities, and the lasting cultural inheritance later inspired her intellectual interests. Cheng graduated with a Bachelor's degree in English and Creative Writing from Princeton University in 1985, earned her Master's in English and Creative Writing at Stanford University in 1987, and received a PhD in Comparative Literature at University California, Berkeley in 1994.

== Research and publications ==
Cheng's first book, The Melancholy of Race (2001), examined melancholia as the very process that forms racial identity the United States. The book weaves a thread between historic moments in the nation's legal system such as the Brown v. Board of Education US Supreme Court case, literature such as Maxine Hong Kingston's Woman Warrior, film such as Flower Drum Song, and conceptual artists such as Theresa Hak Kyung Cha.

Her research often returns to 20th century figures such as Anna May Wong and Josephine Baker. Rather than characterize these highly visible "race beauties" as simply empowering or stereotypical, Cheng asks readers to consider them as "severely compromised" and highly fabricated, aestheticized surfaces that trouble our sense of the human. Benjamin Kahan, Professor of English and Women's and Gender Studies at Louisiana State University, wrote of her second book Second Skin: Josephine Baker & the Modern Surface, "it might be easy to miss that this is a monumental work of scholarship, making major interventions into critical race theory and modernist studies."

Her third book, Ornamentalism (2019), aims to formulate the first "feminist theory for the yellow woman." Cheng has described ornamentalism as a theory concerned with how aesthetic surfaces and decoration participate in the making of personhood, especially for minority women. Rather than treating objectification simply as a loss of subjectivity, she examines how racialize femininity is produced through forms that blur the distinction between the human and the object. By centering her critique on the myth of the "yellow" woman rather than more politically correct, ameliorative terms such as Asian-American, Cheng hoped to address the painful and unspoken ways in which Asiatic femininity is constructed rather than necessarily claimed. In a review of the book, scholar Michelle Lee writes, "building on writers such as Mel Chen and Fred Moten, Cheng’s logic of ornamentalism suggests that objectification is no longer the threatening process which removes subjecthood, but rather prioritizes how objects become animated, highlighting how performances of liberation emerge from inorganic, inanimate places." In an interview with Shivani Radhakrishnan for BOMB Magazine, Cheng says, "I think there is obviously a very well-developed critique of the ways in which Western modernists have appropriated racial otherness in their aesthetics. And they’re right. Except, oftentimes the way that critique is offered ends up reproducing a sort of subject-object divide, so that the Western is a subject of intellectual intent who then takes advantage of the racial other who is an object and ready to be used in this way."

Her most recent book, Ordinary Disasters: How I Stopped Being a Model Minority (2024), is a book of essays which focuses on her personal experiences. For Cheng they "represent a way back to [herself], or, more accurately, back to a self [she has] yet to fully own." She expands on some of the topics she has written about in her previous books and articles such as alienation, interracial relationships and the Asian American experience.

Taken together, Cheng's works build upon race theorists such as Saidiya Hartman, Gayatri Spivak, Frantz Fanon, and Hortense Spillers to place Asian-American studies firmly within the discussion surrounding racial formation in the United States, as seen in her previous books such as The Melancholy of Race (2001) and critical reviews for the Los Angeles Review of Books that have covered Ghost in the Shell, Crazy Rich Asians, Minari, and Mulan. Other essays of hers can be found in The Atlantic, The Nation, Hyperallergic, and Huffington Post.

== Political activism ==
=== Comments on Stop Asian Hate ===
Anne Anlin Cheng was vocal during the 2021 Atlanta Spa Shootings, which targeted Asian women and was motivated by sexual desire. For The New York Times, she penned an op-ed that particularly pushed back on popular assumptions that Asian Americans experienced injuries that were too privileged to warrant serious attention, writing, "There is something wrong with the way Americans think about who deserves social justice — as though attention to nonwhite groups, their histories and conditions, is only as pressing as the injuries that they have suffered." For CBS news, she expanded on this, emphasizing that “Mild forms of racist, sexist harassment is on a continuum of what we saw in Atlanta last week, a very lethal expression of that.”

== Selected publications ==
- Ordinary Disasters (Knopf Doubleday, 2024) ISBN 9780593316825
- Ornamentalism (Oxford University Press, 2019)
- Second Skin: Josephine Baker & the Modern Surface (Oxford University Press, 2011)
- The Melancholy of Race: Psychoanalysis, Assimilation, and Hidden Grief (Oxford University Press, 2001)
