= Singor =

Singor Сингорь
- Village
- Location within Vladimir Oblast Location within Russia
- Coordinates: 56°28′N 41°09′E
- Country: Russia
- Region: Vladimir Oblast
- District: Kovrovsky District
- Time zone: UTC+3:00

Singor (Russian: Сингорь) is a rural locality (a village) in Malyginskoye Rural Settlement, Kovrovsky District, Vladimir Oblast, Russia. The population was 7 as of 2010.

== Geography ==
Singor is located on the Singorka River, 22 km northwest of Kovrov (the district's administrative centre) by road. Klimovo is the nearest rural locality.
