= Tussen Tunnel =

Road tunnel in Møre og Romsdal, Norway

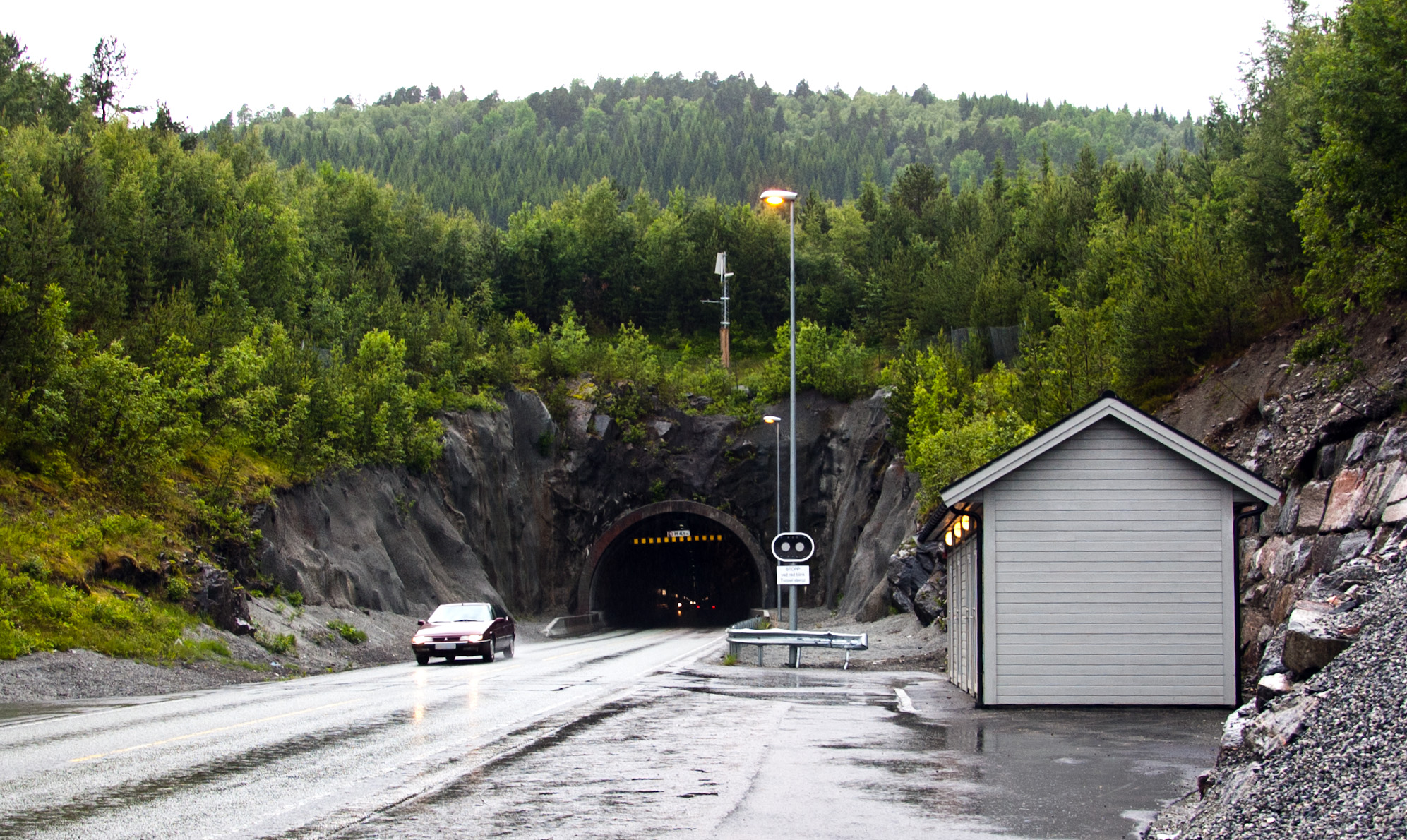
- View of the entrance to the tunnel

Overview
- Location: Møre og Romsdal, Norway
- Coordinates: 62°46′42″N 7°15′10″E
- Status: In use
- Route: Fv64

Operation
- Opened: October 13, 1990
- Traffic: Automotive
- Vehicles per day: 5,000

Technical
- Length: 2,840 m (1.76 mi)

The Tussen Tunnel (Norwegian: Tussentunnelen) is a 2,840-meter (9,320 ft) long road tunnel located on County Road 64 in Møre og Romsdal county, Norway. The tunnel goes through the mountain Tussen and connects Hustadvika Municipality (near the village of Malme) and Molde Municipality (just north of the town of Molde), and it cuts off about 7 kilometres (4.3 mi) from the old road that goes through a valley around the mountain. The tunnel has 5,000 daily vehicles. The tunnel was scheduled to be paid off by 2013.

== History ==
The tunnel opened on 13 October 1990 to shorten the trip on County Road 64 from Fræna Municipality (now part of Hustadvika) to Molde Municipality; however, the tunnel was privately owned. The tunnel was originally not officially part of the county road. The tunnel was owned by Tusten Tunnelselskap AS, which was owned by several local municipalities and banks.

The tunnel was closed for renovation from 15 February to 16 July 2010. During this time, the Norwegian Public Roads Administration upgraded the road and took over the ownership and operation of the tunnel. The upgrades included replacement of all electro-technical equipment, including lights, ventilation, fire equipment; and the laying of new asphalt.
