= Aro (murderer) =

Papua New Guinean murder

Aro (died 16 November 1957) was a Papua New Guinean murderer notable for being the last person executed in Papua New Guinea.

Aro was a young man from Rupamanda, Wabag in the Western Highlands District of the Territory of New Guinea. Aro had suffered a spear injury as a youth, and he was largely unemployed, being supported by his two wives Tipiwan and Ruai, along with his family. On 10 April 1957, he murdered his two wives with an axe. Aro then visited one of his relatives working in a hospital, confessing and asking the relative to take care of his children, and turned himself in at the sub-district headquarters office. According to court testimony, Aro was suspecting his wives of adultery.

On 9 August, Aro was found guilty and sentenced to death. He was flown from Mount Hagen to Lae, where he was executed by hanging on 16 November and buried.

The death penalty in Papua New Guinea was abolished in 1970, five years before Papua New Guinea's independence from Australia. It was reintroduced in 1991, but never applied before being once again abolished in 2022.

== See also ==
- List of most recent executions by jurisdiction
- Use of capital punishment by nation#Oceania
