= Elizabeth Aro =

Argentine artist

- Born: 1961 (age 64–65); Buenos Aires, Argentina
- Known for: Installation Art; Photography
- Website: www.elizabetharo.com

Elizabeth Aro (born 1961) is an Argentine interdisciplinary artist from Buenos Aires. Aro uses fabric to create large-scale site-specific installations, and also uses photographs, drawings, and videos in her exhibitions. Many of her works relate to the perception of space and how individuals define home or where they are from.

== Biography ==
Aro attended the National School of Fine Arts Prilidiano Pueyrredón and the Universidad Nacional de las Artes (UNA), where she majored in art history. Aro was based in Spain for fifteen years and now lives and works in Milan, Italy, though she had been a resident artist at galleries throughout Europe. Many of her pieces are installations that change the narrative of the original work or change the viewer's perception of space. For example, she uses fabric to make roots appear to be going into the space, changing the viewer's perception. Aro's artwork, the "Red Net" series, was used as an example of her time as a migrant outside of Argentina, and to relate and connect to people who have lived in similar conditions. Aro has created many works relating to immigration and opened an exhibition in Spain that featured photographs of immigrants in streets. Much of Aro's work is focused on relationships to home and the effect of relocation upon a person. Aro finds the breaking of gender stereotypes to be important work. She wants to see a change in the view of women as submissive to men, and to break away from the cultural roles men and women often fall into.

== Artworks ==
=== Danza Nocturna, 2022 ===
The installation consists of an old parachute and leaves made with precious jacquard velvet. Velvet is a symbol of luxury and elegance and the leaf shape that Aro gave to the velvet recalls the Amazon rainforest, they are majestic as nature must be, but the color used, black and gray, symbolizes climate change, recalling those images of environments devastated by recent ecological disasters. The heaviness of the dark velvet leaves, in contrast with the lightness of the parachute, create an effect of drama and disquiet. The artwork suggests that despite our indifference, Nature resists and continues to dance and she reminds us that despite the dark times, we too can continue to dance.

=== The fragility of hugs or Raíz de Luz, 2020 ===
Necklace, untreated natural bronze color, CAD design, prototyping with a 3D printer, hand-hammered surfaces alternating with glossy areas and engraved areas 24 × 15 cm.

=== Henry Clew's Cast, 2016 ===
In this art piece, Aro adds brocade fabric to a sculpture by Henry Clew. Aro uses the fabric to make the male subject of the sculpture look to be holding a rope that leads to young children in the base of the sculpture. This art piece is meant to change the narrative of an extant art piece by adding to it in some impermanent way. Before the addition of the fabric, the sculpture had the young children reaching up to the man. With the addition of the fabric, it looks as though the main figure is offering a way for the children to ride up to him.

=== Santa Sangre, 2015 ===
In this piece, Aro uses brocade fabric to create what appears to be reddish-brown roots coming out of a door. This gives the appearance of nature coming indoors and taking over the space. This can be seen through the size of the roots in relation to the size of the room. With the positioning of the fabric piece, it also appears as though the roots are continuing to grow and spread throughout the space.

=== Mundo, 2016 ===
This piece, which is made of layered felt, is a large, white sphere that is meant to represent the world falling apart. The landmasses begin to fall south and merge together.

=== Estudio de Nubes, 2014-2015 ===
Th artwork, which consists of fifty-six pencil drawings of clouds, which the artist uses as a way to demonstrate time and memory. Each column follows one part of the sky as it changes. The artist finds time and memory to be an integral part of her life, and associates time and memory with her experience of moving from one country to another.

=== Ulivo, 2016 ===
The piece consists of brocade fabric and cotton sewn together. This art piece is a sculpture in the shape of a white tree. It is meant to symbolize life and the circle of life. The roots at the bottom of the piece symbolize the tree's connection to the underworld. The high-reaching branches demonstrate the tree's connection to the heavens or the celestial sphere. This art installation piece often dominates the space it occupies.

== Exhibitions ==
=== Solo exhibitions ===
- 2024 Atelier Aro, Gagliardi and Domke, Turin, Italy
- 2023 Labyrinth, Museo Storico Reale Mutua Art Site Fest, Turin, Italy
- 2022 Memoria del Presente, Zaion Gallery, Biella, Italy
- 2022 Danza Nocturna, for Artsite Fest, Principato di Lucedio, Italy
- 2022 Vincerà la Bellezza, Fantastik Lab, Valencia, Spain
- 2022 Open Studio, Rèves, Citè Internationale Des Arts, Paris, France
- 2021 Fiori e Fiamme, Babs Art Gallery, Milan, Italy
- 2019 Dreaming in Red, Chateau La Napoule, Cannes, France
- 2018 Brumas, Nuova Galleria Morone, Milan, Italy
- 2018 Le Fil du Monde, Fondazione Filatoio, Caraglio, Italy
- 2017 Provisorio para Siempre, Galleria Canepaneri, Genoa, Italy
- 2016 Mundo e Los Otros, Gagliardi e Domke, Turin, Italy
- 2015 Los Otros, Ex Chiesa di San Carpoforo, Academy of Brera, Milan, Italy
- 2015 Santa Sangre, Moritzkirche, Augsburg, Germany
- 2013 La trilogia Esistenziale, Galleria Gagliardi e Domke, Turin, Italy
- 2013 Rehenes-Ostaggi Sala Santa Rita, Rome, Italy
- 2012 All Fires, The Fire, Pasajist, Istanbul, Turkey
- 2005 Espacio Uno, Centro de Arte Reina Sofia, Madrid, Spain
- 2003 Quien te ha invitado a esta fiesta?, Diana Lowenstein Fine Arts, Miami, USA
- 2002 Elizabeth Aro. Spazio Erasmus Brera, Milan, Italy
- 2001 De la Gente y el Paisaje, Casa Rivadavia, Cadiz, Spain
- 2000 Instituto de America de Santa Fe, Granada, Spain
- 1999 Galeria Arteara, Madrid, Spain
- 1998 Jacob Carpio - Atma Gallery, San José, Costa Rica

=== Group exhibitions ===
- 2023 Preziose prospettive: sculture e gioielli in dialogo, Kromya Art Gallery, Verona, Italy
- 2022 Bicocca SuperLab, Milan, Italy
- 2019 BienNolo, Milan, Italy
- 2019 Second Biennale of Mountados, Tynos, Greece
- 2017 Sequela, Ex Chiesa San Mattia, Bologna, Italy
- 2016 Biennale Internationale, Casablanca, Morocco
- 2015 Zoom – Fotografia Italiana, Fondazione Remotti, Camogli, Italy
- 2015 Kunst/Stoff Tim Museum, Germany
- 2006 Take me with you, Mori Museum Japan
- 2006 La donna oggeto Castello de Vigevano, Italy
- 2005 Generation of arts, Chiesa de San Francesco Como, Italy
- 2002 I filo raccontato, Museo de Trento y Rovereto, Italy
- 2002 Feria de Bologna, Spazio Erasmus Brera, Milan, Italy
- 2002 Artistas de la Galeria, escritorio de Arte Rosa Barbosa, São Paulo, Brazil
- 2002 Amantes, comisariado por Lorenzo Taiuti, Care of, Milan, Italy
- 2001 Italian Connection, Kunthaus Berna, Switzerland
- 2001 Arco 2001, Diana Lowenstein Fine Arts, Madrid, Spain
- 2001 Kunst Koln Fair Colonia, Galeria Antoni Pinyol, Colonia, Germany
- 2001 Miart 2001, studio Erasmus Brera, Milan, Italy
- 2001 Contemporary Photography, Diana Lowenstein Fine Arts, Miami, USA
- 2000 Artists' Presentation #4, Diana Lowenstein Fine Arts, Miami, USA
- 2000 Quello che non c'e, Curator Gabi Scardi, Spazio Erasmus Brera, Milan, Italy
- 2000 Ciclo de Autor: Guardando il tuo vestito, Museo de Arte Moderno, Buenos Aires, Argentina
- 2000 Domestico '00, residencia Privada, Madrid, Spain
- 2000 Project Room, Territorio Domestico Curador: Fernando Castro Florez
- 2000 Interart 00', Valencia, Spain
- 2000 Benvinguts a la sociatat del I'espectcle ACM Mataro, Barcelona, Spain
- 1999 Supermegadrops, Via Farini, Milan, Italy
- 1998 Fondation Argentine, Cité Internationale Universitaire de Paris, France
- 1997 La otra orilla, Casa de América, Madrid, Spain
- 1996 Argentinien Ursprünge und Erbe, traveling exhibition: Museum Giessen Galerie Am Fischmarkt Erfurt, Galerie Rähnnitzgasse der Landeshauptstadt Dresden, Museum für Völkerkunde Berlin-Dahlem, Germany
- 1991 La Escuela del Sur, el taller de Torres García y su legado, traveling exhibition: USA, Mexico, Spain

== Residencies ==
- 2022 Cité International Des Arts, Paris, France
- 2020 Cité International Des Arts, Paris, France
- 2019 Foundation La Napoule, Mandelieu, Cannes, France
- 2018 Residenza Shared Lambrate, Officine Tamborrino, Italy
- 2016 Centre d'art Contemporain Ifitry, Essaouira, Morocco
- 2016 Foundation La Napoule, Mandeliu, France
- 2007 Fondation Australis, Rotterdam - The Netherlands
- 2002 El Paraiso es de los extranos. Arteleku, San Sebastián, Spain
- 2000 Foundation Rodriguez Acosta, Granada, Spain
- 1996 Fondazione Ratti, Como, Italy

== Collections ==
- Galleria Arte Moderna Torino
- Museum of Contemporary Art of Rosario
- Museum of Modern Art of Buenos Aires

== Bibliography ==
- Redazione. TRINO. Al Principato di Lucedio Danza Nocturna e Figure infinite. 24 October 2022.
- ArtSiteFest. Elizabeth Aro
- Gallo Chiara. Fino al 6.I.2019 Elizabeth Aro Filatoio di Caraglio. 2018.
- Paolo Roggero. Elizabeth Aro: scolpire con ago e filo. 25 October 2018.
- Redazione. Le sculture in tessuto di Elizabeth Aro al Filatoio di Caraglio 26 ottobre. 19 October 2018.
- Paola Stoppina, I mondi onirici di matita e velluto di Elizabeth Aro, 23 April 2018.
- Bria Ginevra, Elizabeth Aro. Los Otros in San Carpoforo. 11 August 2015.
- “Los Otros” si incontrano a Brera. Elizabeth Aro porta in scene geografie del mondo e del cuore, partendo da sud. 2015.
- Redazione. Rehenes - Ostaggi di Elizabeth Aro e Silvia Levenson. 2013.
- Varone Patrizia. Elizabeth Aro. La memoria, l’equilibrio delle forme e l’altro. 2011.
- C’è anche Elizabeth Aro ad Artefiera. In galleria? No, nell’Exibart-stand… 25 January 2011.
- Mather, Frank Jewett. Sherman, Frederic Fairchild. Art in America, Volume 93, Issues 7-11 F.F. Sherman, 2005.
- Aro, Elizabeth, Elizabeth Aro: 10 de noviembre de 2004 al 2 de enero de 2005, Museo Nacional Centro de Arte Reina Sofía. Museo Nacional Centro de Arte Reina Sofía, 2004
- Paternosto, César. The Stone and the Thread: Andean Roots of Abstract Art., University of Texas Press, 1996
