= Johan Emil Aro =

Johan Emil Aro (1874–1928) was a Finnish entomologist.

Aro was a school teacher in Viborg . He worked mainly on Ephemeroptera.

== Works ==
Partial list

- 1910: Piirteitä päiväkorennoisten (Ephemeridae) elämäntavoista ja kehityksestä. - Viipurin suomalaisen realilyseon vuosikertomus, p. 1-32.
- 1928: Suomen päivänkorennoiset (Ephemerida). - Otavan hyönteiskirjasia 3 / Vanamon kirjoja 27:1-68.
