= Hjelset =

Village in Molde Municipality, Norway

- Village
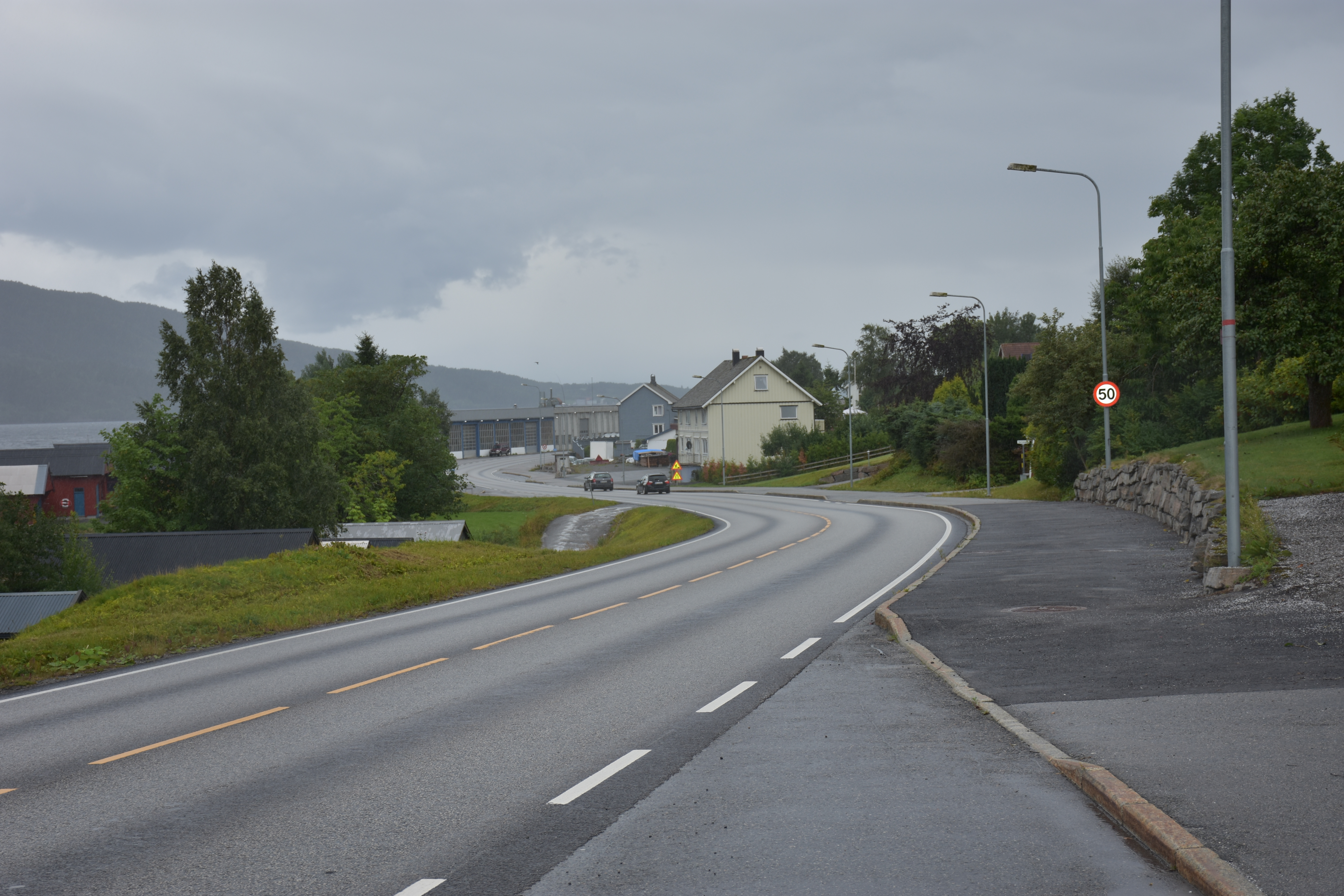
- Hjelset housing and road
- Interactive map of Hjelset
- Location within Møre og Romsdal Location within Norway
- Coordinates: 62.7805°N 7.4928°E
- Country: Norway
- Region: Western Norway
- County: Møre og Romsdal
- District: Romsdal
- Municipality: Molde Municipality

Area
  - Total: 1.04 km^{2} (0.40 sq mi)
- Elevation: 10 m (33 ft)

Population (2024)
  - Total: 1,001
  - Density: 963/km^{2} (2,490/sq mi)
- Time zone: UTC+01:00 (CET)
  - Summer (DST): UTC+02:00 (CEST)
- Post Code: 6450 Hjelset

Hjelset is a village in Molde Municipality in Møre og Romsdal county, Norway. It is located on the north shore of the Fannefjorden, about 8 kilometres (5.0 mi) west of the village of Kleive and about 16 kilometres (9.9 mi) east of the town of Molde. The European route E39 highway runs through the village on its way northeast from the town of Molde to the village of Batnfjordsøra in Gjemnes Municipality.

The 1.04-square-kilometre (260-acre) village has a population (2024) of 1001 and a population density of 963 inhabitants per square kilometre (2,490/sq mi).
