= Asia Regional Organic Standard =

- Abbreviation: AROS
- Formation: 2012; 14 years ago
- Type: NGO
- Headquarters: n/a
- Region served: Asia
- Official language: English
- Main organ: General Assembly
- Parent organization: FAO, IFOAM, UNCTAD

Asia Regional Organic Standard (AROS) is a common regional standard for organic production in East, South-East and South Asia. AROS results from a process intended to harmonize existing organic standards in that region and to promote new ones. It was launched by the Global Organic Market Access (GOMA) project, sponsored by Food and Agriculture Organization of the United Nations (FAO), International Federation of Organic Agriculture Movements (IFOAM), and United Nations Conference on Trade and Development (UNCTAD).

== History ==
In 2002 FAO, IFOAM and UNCTAD began a partnership to promote trade in organic produce by harmonizing the many different organic standards and technical regulations. The partnership created the International Task Force on Harmonization and Equivalence in Organic Agriculture (ITF), which in 2008 issued a set of recommendations to facilitate organic trade. ITF also produced two practical tools to aid in assessing equivalence: the Guide for Assessing Equivalence of Organic Standards and Technical Regulations (EquiTool), concerned with standards for organic production and processing; and the International Requirements for Organic Certification Bodies (IROCB), concerned with criteria for good practice in organic certification bodies.

In 2009 the three partner organizations set up the Global Organic Market Access (GOMA) project, to follow up on the work of the ITF. GOMA’s work up to 2012 included setting up regional initiatives for harmonization and trade, including one for East, South-East and South Asia. GOMA organized a Working Group for Cooperation on Organic Labeling and Trade for Asia, which initiated the Asia Regional Organic Standard (AROS) and developed it through a public-private partnership of stakeholders.

A subgroup of the Working Group, known as the Asia Organic Standards Drafting Group, coordinated development of the Standard. The Working Group approved the final draft at its meeting in Nuremberg, Germany in February 2012.

A task force from ASEAN countries in 2013 agreed to use AROS as a working document to develop an ‘ASEAN Standard for Organic Agriculture’ (ASOA), to work towards equivalence among the five out of 10 member states that had by then established national organic standards, as well as for adoption by the remaining countries. ASOA was finally adopted in late 2014, and incorporates most of the content of AROS.

== The AROS standard ==
The standard states general requirements under the headings of:

- General Requirements for Organic Production and Processing
- Crop Production Management Systems
- Processing and Handling
- Labeling

The standard does not cover procedures for verification, such as inspection or certification of products.

Major sources for the standards include:

- IFOAM Basic Standards for Organic Production and Processing. Version 2005;
- CAC/GL 32, Codex Alimentarius – Guidelines for the production, processing, labelling, and marketing of organically produced foods;
- EquiTool Annex 2 – Common Objectives and Requirements for Organic Standards (COROS), 2012.

== See also ==
- Association of Natural Biocontrol Producers
- List of countries with organic agriculture regulation
- List of organic food topics
- Organic food
- Organic clothing
- Organic cotton
- Standards of identity for food
- Farm assurance
- Certified Naturally Grown
- Chitosan (Natural Biocontrol for Agricultural & Horticultural use qualified for organic use )
- Herbicide
- Pesticide
