= Gilang =

Gilang is a masculine given name from Indonesia. Notable people with the name include:

- Gilang Angga (born 1980), Indonesian footballer
- Gilang Ginarsa (born 1988), Indonesian footballer
- Gilang Ramadhan (born 1995), Indonesian beach volleyball player
