= Oomsis =

Coordinates: 6°41′S 146°48′E

Oomsis is a village in Morobe Province of Papua-New Guinea. It is located east of the valley of the Markham River along the Bulolo Highway Road. It is 51.1 km north of Lae, and 11.7 km southeast of Gabensis. There is a creek of the same name in the area. Oomsis has a forestry station.
