= Kleive, Møre og Romsdal =

Village in Molde Municipality, Norway

Kleive
- Village
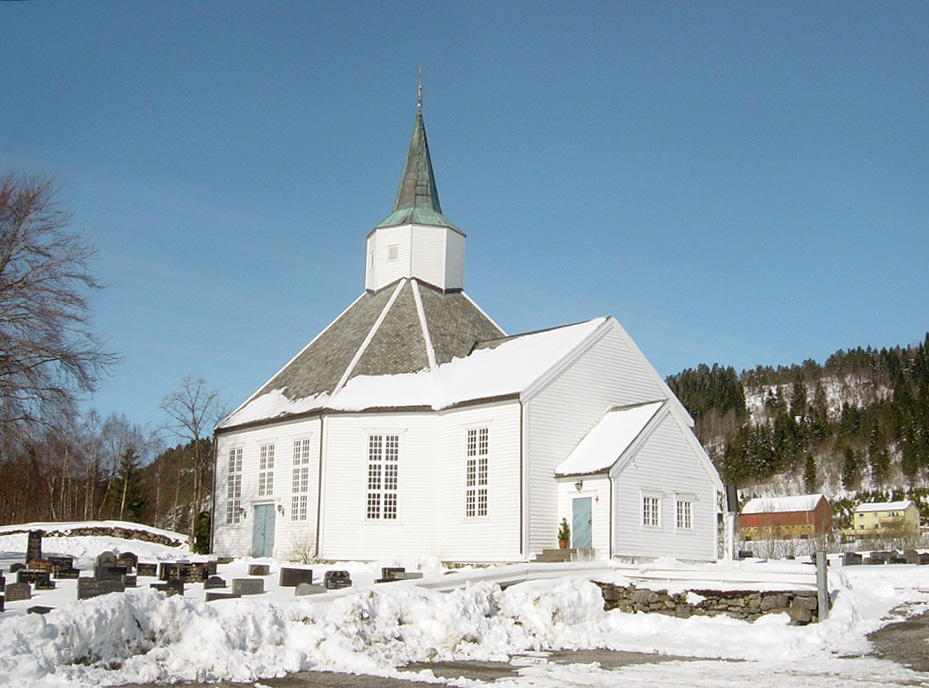
- Interactive map of Kleive
- Location within Møre og Romsdal Location within Norway
- Coordinates: 62.7952°N 7.6369°E
- Country: Norway
- Region: Western Norway
- County: Møre og Romsdal
- District: Romsdal
- Municipality: Molde Municipality

Area
  - Total: 0.5 km^{2} (0.19 sq mi)
- Elevation: 29 m (95 ft)

Population (2024)
  - Total: 422
  - Density: 844/km^{2} (2,190/sq mi)
- Time zone: UTC+01:00 (CET)
  - Summer (DST): UTC+02:00 (CEST)
- Post Code: 6453 Kleive

Kleive is a village in Molde Municipality in Møre og Romsdal county, Norway. It is located at the end of the Fannefjorden, about 25 kilometres (16 mi) east of the city of Molde and about 7 kilometres (4.3 mi) east of the village of Hjelset. Kleive Church is located in the village.

The 0.5-square-kilometre (120-acre) village has a population (2024) of 422 and a population density of 844 inhabitants per square kilometre (2,190/sq mi).
