= Bremsnes =

Bremsnes may refer to:

== Places ==
- Bremsnes, Møre og Romsdal, a village in Averøy Municipality in Møre og Romsdal county, Norway
- Bremsnes Municipality, a former municipality in Møre og Romsdal county, Norway
- Bremsnes Church, a church in Averøy Municipality in Møre og Romsdal county, Norway

== Other ==
- Bremsnes IL, a sports club based in Averøy Municipality in Møre og Romsdal county, Norway
