= Bremsnes Municipality =

Former municipality in Norway

Bremsnes Municipality Bremsnes herred
- Former municipality
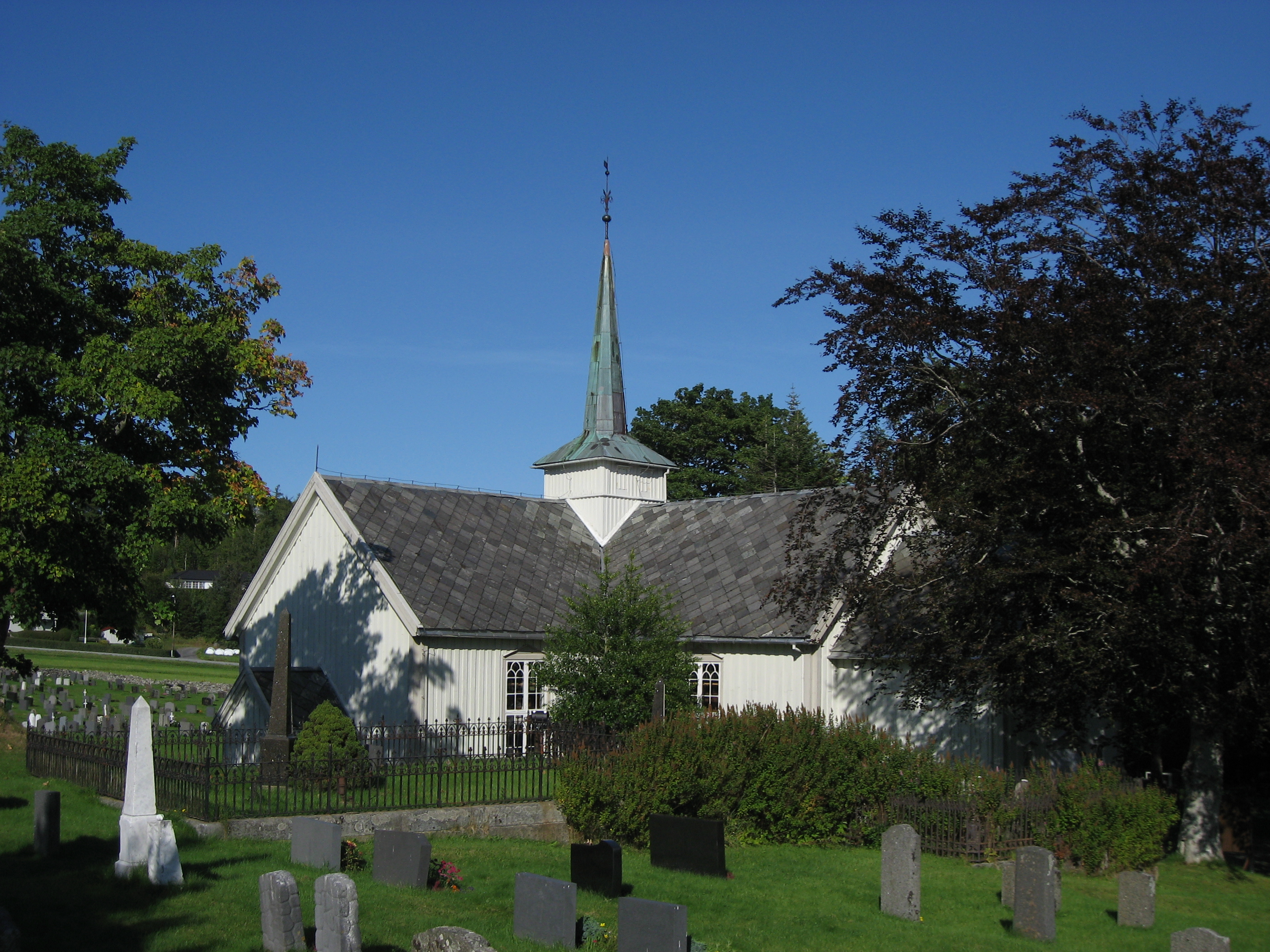
- Church in Bremsnes

- Møre og Romsdal within Norway

- Bremsnes within Møre og Romsdal
- Coordinates: 63°05′18″N 07°39′40″E
- Country: Norway
- County: Møre og Romsdal
- District: Nordmøre
- Established: 1 Jan 1897
  - Preceded by: Kvernes Municipality
- Disestablished: 1 Jan 1964
  - Succeeded by: Averøy Municipality
- Administrative centre: Bremsnes

Government
  - Mayor (1959-1963): Ingolf Junge (Ap)

Area (upon dissolution)
  - Total: 119.7 km^{2} (46.2 sq mi)
  - Rank: #482 in Norway
- Highest elevation: 751.03 m (2,464.0 ft)

Population (1963)
  - Total: 5,071
  - Rank: #179 in Norway
  - Density: 42.4/km^{2} (110/sq mi)
  - Change (10 years): ▼ −6%
- Demonym: Bremsnesing

Official language
  - Norwegian form: Neutral
- Time zone: UTC+01:00 (CET)
  - Summer (DST): UTC+02:00 (CEST)
- ISO 3166 code: NO-1554

Bremsnes is a former municipality in Møre og Romsdal county, Norway. The 120-square-kilometre (46 sq mi) municipality existed from 1897 until its dissolution in 1964. Bremsnes Municipality surrounded the Bremsnesfjorden and it included parts of the islands of Averøya, Frei, and Nordlandet. Bremsnes essentially encircled the town of Kristiansund on the west, south, and east sides. The administrative centre of Bremsnes was the village of Bremsnes, where Bremsnes Church is located.

Prior to its dissolution in 1964, the 119.7-square-kilometre (46.2 sq mi) municipality was the 482nd largest by area out of the 689 municipalities in Norway. Bremsnes Municipality was the 179th most populous municipality in Norway with a population of about 5,071. The municipality's population density was 42.4 inhabitants per square kilometre (110/sq mi) and its population had decreased by 6% over the previous 10-year period.

== General information ==
The municipality of Bremsnes was established on 1 January 1897 when the large Kvernes Municipality was divided into four new municipalities: Eide Municipality (population: 1,552) in the west, Kornstad Municipality (population: 1,599) in the central part, Bremsnes Municipality (population: 2,917) in the north, and (a much smaller) Kvernes Municipality (population: 857) in the southeast. On 8 July 1903, an uninhabited area of Bremsnes Municipality was transferred over to Kvernes Municipality.

During the 1960s, there were many municipal mergers across Norway due to the work of the Schei Committee. On 1 January 1964, Bremsnes Municipality was dissolved. The Bolga and Valen areas on the island of Frei (population: 884) became a part of Frei Municipality. The Dale area on the island of Nordlandet (population: 963) was incorporated into Kristiansund Municipality. The rest of Bremsnes Municipality (population: 3,153) was merged with Kvernes Municipality (population: 693) and most of Kornstad Municipality (population: 1,356) to create the new Averøy Municipality.

=== Name ===
The municipality (originally the parish) is named after the old Bremsnes farm (Old Norse: Brymsnes) since the first Bremsnes Church was built there. The first element is brim which means "surf" or "the surface of the sea". The last element is nes which means "headland".

=== Churches ===
The Church of Norway had one parish (sokn) within Bremsnes Municipality. At the time of the municipal dissolution, it was part of the Kvernes prestegjeld and the Ytre Nordmøre prosti (deanery) in the Diocese of Nidaros.

Churches in Bremsnes Municipality
Parish (sokn)	Church name	Location of the church	Year built
Bremsnes	Bremsnes Church	Bremsnes	1771
Bremsnes	Langøy Chapel	Langøyneset	1935

== Geography ==
The municipality was located on the northern coast of the island of Averøya plus some smaller surrounding islands on both sides of the Bremsnesfjorden. Kristiansund Municipality was to the east, Frei Municipality and Kvernes Municipality were to the south, and Kornstad Municipality was to the west. The highest point in the municipality was the 751-metre (2,464 ft) tall mountain Mekknøken, on the border with Kvernes Municipality.

== Government ==
While it existed, Bremsnes Municipality was responsible for primary education (through 10th grade), outpatient health services, senior citizen services, welfare and other social services, zoning, economic development, and municipal roads and utilities. The municipality was governed by a municipal council of directly elected representatives. The mayor was indirectly elected by a vote of the municipal council. The municipality was under the jurisdiction of the Frostating Court of Appeal.

=== Municipal council ===
The municipal council (Herredsstyre) of Bremsnes Municipality was made up of 29 representatives that were elected to four year terms. The tables below show the historical composition of the council by political party.

Bremsnes herredsstyre 1959–1963
Party name (in Norwegian)	Number of representatives
Labour Party (Arbeiderpartiet)	15
Christian Democratic Party (Kristelig Folkeparti)	5
Centre Party (Senterpartiet)	3
Liberal Party (Venstre)	6
Total number of members:	29

Bremsnes herredsstyre 1955–1959
Party name (in Norwegian)	Number of representatives
Labour Party (Arbeiderpartiet)	15
Christian Democratic Party (Kristelig Folkeparti)	7
Farmers' Party (Bondepartiet)	3
Liberal Party (Venstre)	4
Total number of members:	29

Bremsnes herredsstyre 1951–1955
Party name (in Norwegian)	Number of representatives
Labour Party (Arbeiderpartiet)	9
Christian Democratic Party (Kristelig Folkeparti)	6
Farmers' Party (Bondepartiet)	2
Liberal Party (Venstre)	3
Total number of members:	20

Bremsnes herredsstyre 1947–1951
Party name (in Norwegian)	Number of representatives
Labour Party (Arbeiderpartiet)	9
Christian Democratic Party (Kristelig Folkeparti)	6
Farmers' Party (Bondepartiet)	2
Liberal Party (Venstre)	2
Local List(s) (Lokale lister)	1
Total number of members:	20

Bremsnes herredsstyre 1945–1947
Party name (in Norwegian)	Number of representatives
Labour Party (Arbeiderpartiet)	8
Communist Party (Kommunistiske Parti)	1
Christian Democratic Party (Kristelig Folkeparti)	7
Farmers' Party (Bondepartiet)	2
Liberal Party (Venstre)	2
Total number of members:	20

Bremsnes herredsstyre 1937–1941*
Party name (in Norwegian)	Number of representatives
Labour Party (Arbeiderpartiet)	11
Farmers' Party (Bondepartiet)	3
Liberal Party (Venstre)	4
Joint List(s) of Non-Socialist Parties (Borgerlige Felleslister)	2
Total number of members:	20
Note: Due to the German occupation of Norway during World War II, no elections were held for new municipal councils until after the war ended in 1945.

=== Mayors ===
The mayor (Norwegian: ordfører) of Bremsnes Municipality was the political leader of the municipality and the chairperson of the municipal council. The following people have held this position:

- 1897–1897: Rasmus Pedersen Schmedling
- 1898–1907: Peder Pedersen Grønvig
- 1908–1910: Peder N. Løkke
- 1911–1928: Nikolai Kjønø
- 1928–1930: Peder M. Vaagen
- 1930–1934: Løve Knutsen Vebenstad (Bp)
- 1934–1941: Johan Nygård (Ap)
- 1941–1943: Iver Bjørshol
- 1943–1945: P.E. Bae (NS)
- 1945–1947: Johan Nygård (Ap)
- 1947–1955: Johannes Bae (KrF)
- 1955–1959: Jakob Knutsen (Ap)
- 1959–1963: Ingolf Junge (Ap)

== See also ==
- List of former municipalities of Norway
