= Stavnes Lighthouse =

Coastal lighthouse in Norway

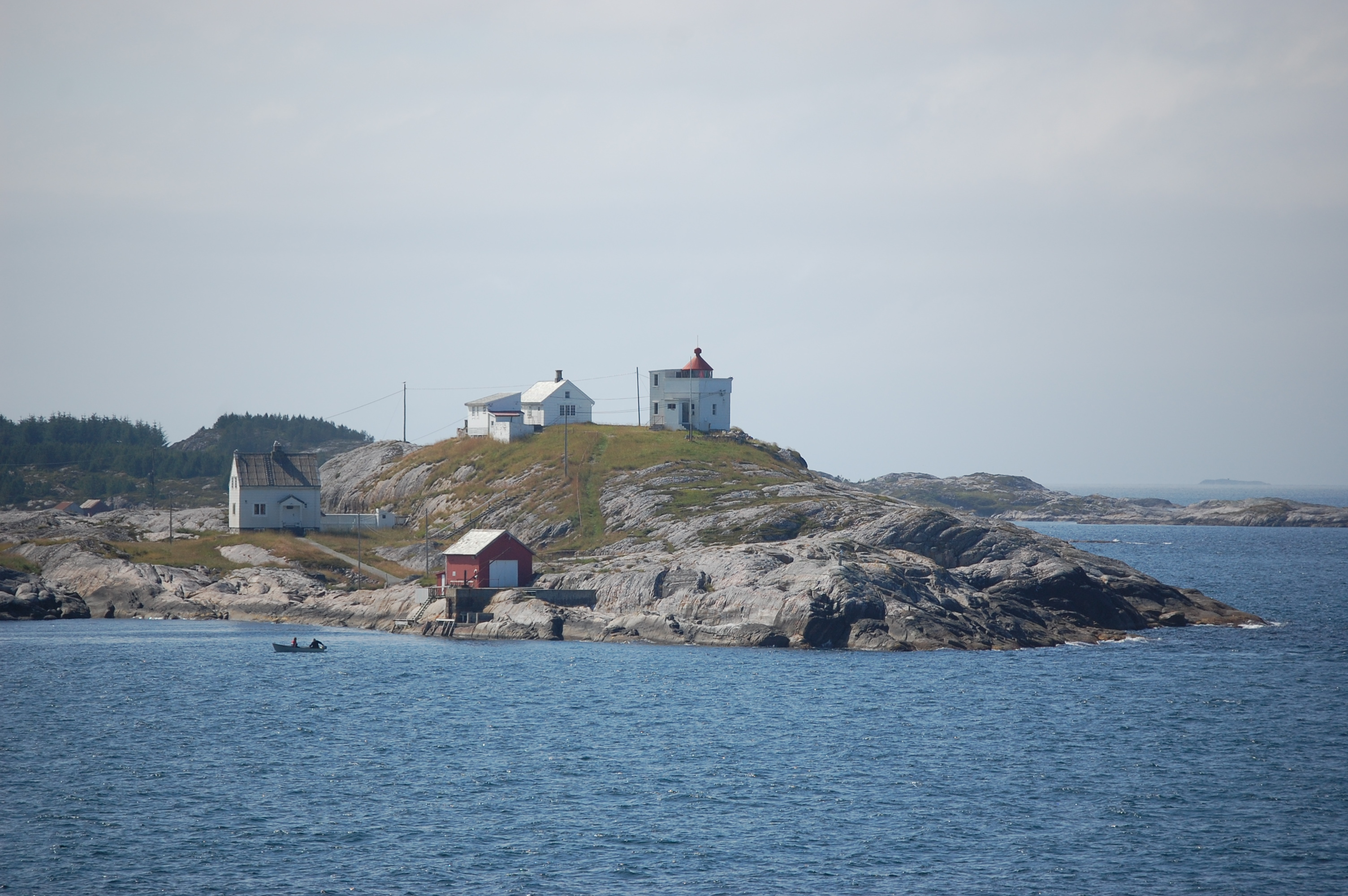
- View of the lighthouse
- Location: Møre og Romsdal, Norway
- Coordinates: 63°06′52″N 07°39′47.1″E

Tower
- Constructed: 1842 (first)
- Construction: masonry tower
- Automated: 1976
- Height: 8 metres (26 ft)
- Shape: square tower with lantern
- Markings: white tower, red lantern
- Heritage: cultural heritage preservation in Norway

Light
- First lit: 1894 (current)
- Focal height: 21.7 metres (71 ft)
- Intensity: 25,900 candela
- Range: 14.3 nmi (26.5 km; 16.5 mi)
- Characteristic: Oc (3) WRG 10s

Stavnes Lighthouse or Stavneset Lighthouse (Norwegian: Stavenes fyr / Stavneset fyr) is a coastal lighthouse in Averøy Municipality in Møre og Romsdal county, Norway. The lighthouse sits on the Stavneset peninsula on the northeastern coast of the island Averøya, along the Bremsnesfjorden. The lighthouse was built to mark the entrance to the fjord, which is near the port of the city of Kristiansund, a few kilometres away.

The lighthouse was originally built in 1842 and it was rebuilt in 1894. The lighthouse was automated in 1976. The light sits at an elevation of 22 metres (72 ft) above sea level and it emits a white, red, or green light (depending on direction) occulting in groups of three every 10 seconds. The light burns from 16 July until 21 May every year, but it does not burn in the summer due to the midnight sun. The lighthouse is painted white with a red top.

== See also ==
- Lighthouses in Norway
- List of lighthouses in Norway
