= Storvatnet (Averøy) =

Lake in Averøy, Norway

Coordinates: 63.045°N 7.607°E

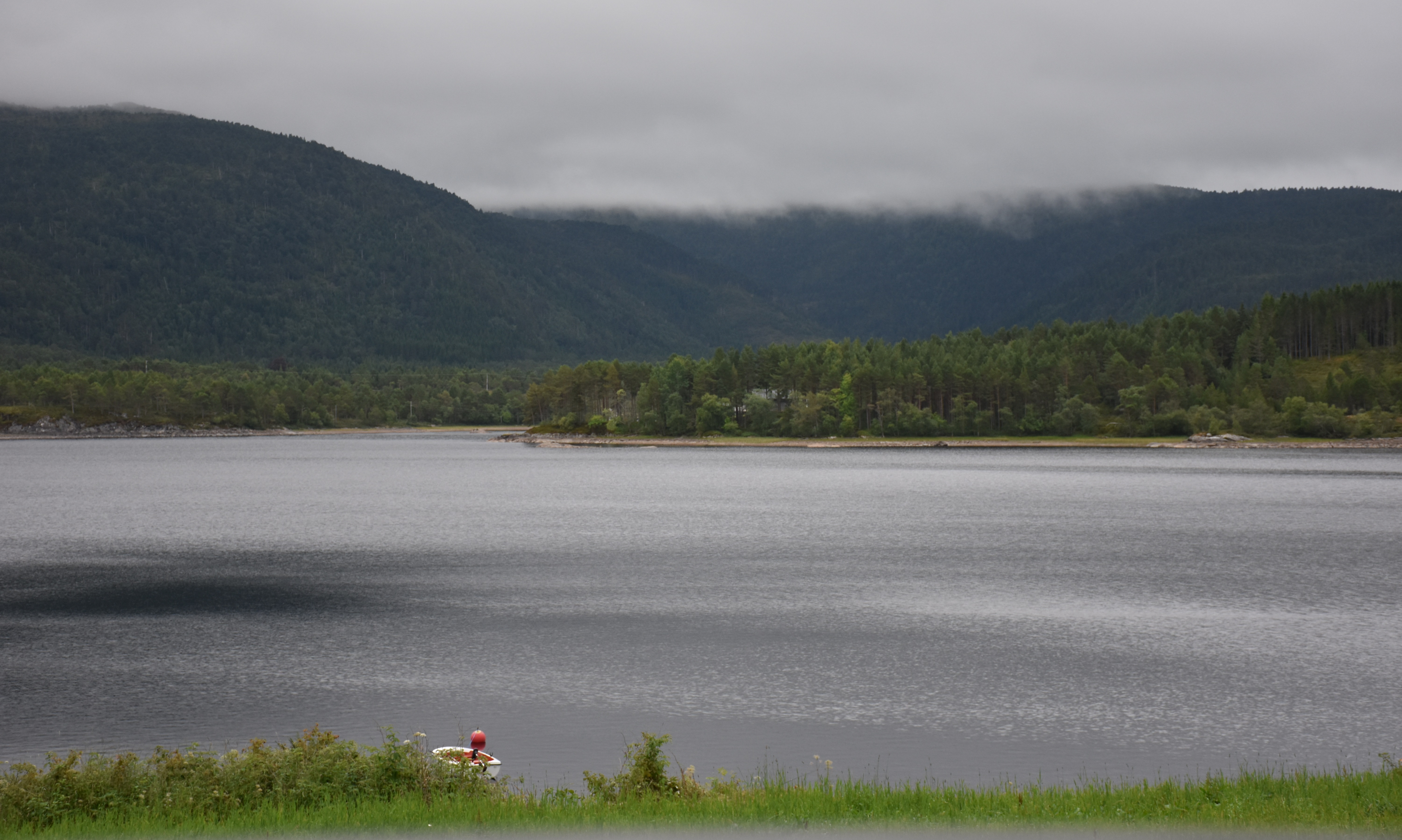
Storvatnet

Storvatnet ("the big lake") is the biggest lake on Averøya island in Norway. It is located between the small urban areas of Bådalen and Bruhagen. Storvatnet has an area of 0,76 km^{2} and its maximum width/length is 1,2 by 1,1 kilometres. Storvatnet is a drinking water reservoir.

== Islets ==
There are two islets on Storvatnet. The first is Storvassholmen ("the islet on the big lake"), also called Ebbelholmen. It is named after the late district doctor, Ebbel, who owned the islet until the 1970s. The other islet is Litjvassholmen (meaning "the small islet on the big lake".) A low uninhabited islet, Grasholmen ("the grass islet") is located to the north in the lake. It is flooded during wet periods.

== Drainage basin and river mouths ==
Storvatnet's biggest drainage basin is located southeast in the area of Haukåsvatnet, Ramsdalen and Straumsetra. Storvatnet and Haukåsvatnet are connected through Stokkåa. The outlying land southwest of the Nørdkullen ("North hill") and the Haukåshaugen ("Hawk hill pile") forms the drainage basin for Storvatnet. Storvatnet's outgoing river mouth in the Gammelfossen waterfall.

== Dam ==
In the late 1800s, Storvatnet was a water reservoir for the mill "Lyhs-mølla", which was built by the Gammelfossen waterfalls. The water level of Storvatnet was controlled in the dam by logs piled to form an adjustable barrier in an opening in the waterfall. In the 70's, the Storvatnet was permanently barraged by the local water company.

== Recreation ==
As a drinking water reservoir, swimming is prohibited. The surrounding areas are popular hiking areas and the lake it is popular for recreational fishing. The only access to the small islets (except via the ice during winter) is by rowing boats. In recent years, small sailing boats have been observed on the Storvatnet.

== Fauna ==
The area surrounding Storvatnet has rich animal and bird life. The population of deer increased in the 60's and 70's, and deer and roe deer are common. Predators such as fox, mink and otter are common as well. Many seabirds species use the Storvatnet and the vicinity for nesting. The white-tailed eagle is often seen there and is their nesting area.
