= Storseisundet Bridge =

Storseisundet Bridge Storseisundbrua
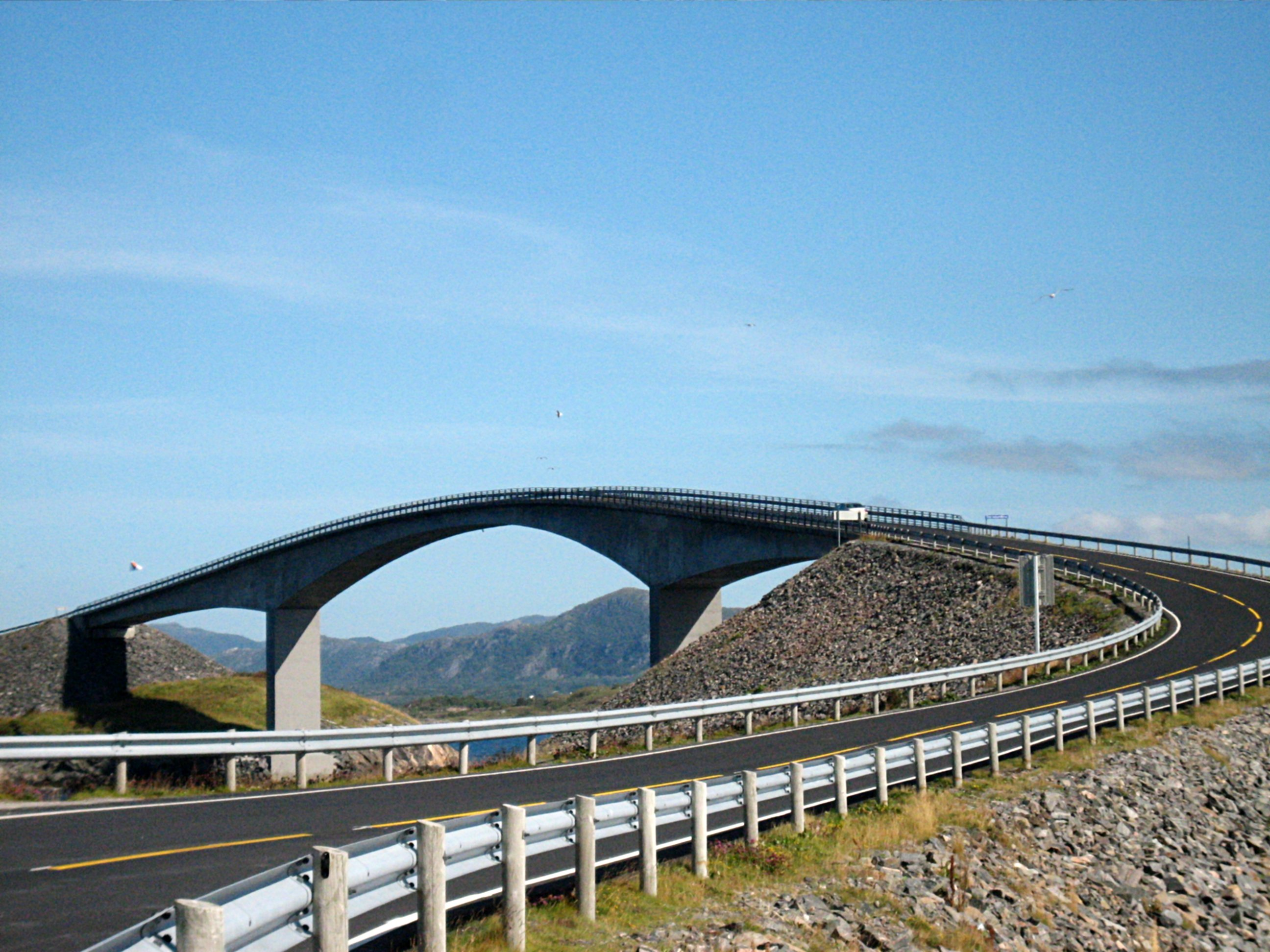
- Coordinates: 63°01′00″N 7°21′16″E
- Carries: Fv64
- Crosses: Storseisund
- Locale: Hustadvika Municipality-Averøy Municipality, Norway

Characteristics
- Design: Cantilever bridge
- Total length: 260 metres (850 ft)
- Longest span: 130 metres (430 ft)
- Clearance below: 23 metres (75 ft)

History
- Opened: 7 July 1989; 36 years ago

Statistics
- Daily traffic: 2000
- Toll: no, only 1989-1999

Location
- Interactive map of Storseisundet Bridge

The Storseisundet Bridge (Norwegian: Storseisundbrua) is the longest of the eight bridges that make up the Atlanterhavsveien ("The Atlantic Road"), the road connection from the mainland Romsdal peninsula to the island of Averøya in Møre og Romsdal county, Norway.

The bridge sits on the border between Hustadvika Municipality and Averøy Municipality and passes through an archipelago as it links mainland Norway with the island of Averoy. It is one of the country's official national tourist routes.

Storseisundet Bridge is a cantilever bridge that is 260 metres (850 ft) long and with a maximum clearance to the sea of 23 metres (75 ft). The length including the embankments on both ends, is around 750 metres (2,460 ft). It was opened on 7 July 1989, and it was a toll road until June 1999.

Over the six years that it took to construct, workers struggled with the region's wild weather and were interrupted by twelve strong wind storms. 122 million kr were spent completing the project, seventy-five percent of which came from public grants. The rest of the funding was recovered with toll fees. The bridge was originally projected to recoup its investment in 15 years, but was completely paid for in ten years.

== See also ==
- List of bridges in Norway
- List of bridges in Norway by length
