= Storvatnet =

Storvatnet, Storavatnet, or Storevatnet are variants of the Norwegian word for "big lake". It may refer to:

== Places ==
- Storvatnet (Averøy), a lake in Averøy Municipality in Møre og Romsdal county, Norway
- Storvatnet (Bykle), a lake in Bykle Municipality in Agder county, Norway
- Storvatnet (Indre Fosen), a lake in Indre Fosen Municipality in Trøndelag county, Norway
- Storvatnet (Narvik), a lake in Narvik Municipality in Nordland county, Norway
- Storvatnet (Nærøy), a lake in Nærøysund Municipality in Trøndelag county, Norway
- Storavatnet, a lake in Bergen Municipality in Vestland county, Norway
- Storavatnet or Byrkjelandsvatnet, a lake in Bjerkreim Municipality in Rogaland county, Norway
