= Kongshaug =

Kongshaug is a Norwegian surname. Notable people with the surname include:

- Erling Kongshaug (1915–1993), Norwegian sport shooter
- Jan Erik Kongshaug (1944–2019), Norwegian sound engineer
- Leif Helge Kongshaug (born 1949), Norwegian politician
- Peder Kongshaug (born 2001), Norwegian speed skater
