= Atlantic Ocean Road =

Road in Møre og Romsdal, Norway

Coordinates: 63.0167°N 7.3545°E

Atlantic Ocean Road
- Bokmål: Atlanterhavsveien; Nynorsk: Atlanterhavsvegen

Route information
- Maintained by Norwegian Public Roads Administration
- Length: 8.3 km (5.2 mi)
- Existed: 7 July 1989–present

Location
- Country: Norway
- Districts: Nordmøre

Highway system
- Roads in Norway; National Roads; County Roads

The Atlantic Ocean Road or the Atlantic Road (Norwegian: Atlanterhavsvegen / Atlanterhavsveien) is an 8.3-kilometer (5.2 mi) long section of County Road 64 that runs through an archipelago that crosses Hustadvika Municipality and Averøy Municipality in Møre og Romsdal county, Norway. It passes by Hustadvika, an unsheltered part of the Norwegian Sea, connecting the island of Averøya with the mainland and the Romsdalshalvøya peninsula. It runs between the villages of Kårvåg in Averøy and Vevang in Hustadvika. It is built on several small islands and skerries, which are connected by several causeways, viaducts and eight bridges—the most prominent being Storseisundet Bridge.

The route was originally proposed as a railway line in the early 20th century, but this was abandoned. Serious planning of the road started in the 1970s, and construction started on 1 August 1983. During construction the area was hit by 12 European windstorms. The road was opened on 7 July 1989, having cost 122 million kr, of which 25 percent was financed with tolls and the rest from public grants. Collection of tolls was scheduled to run for 15 years, but by June 1999 the road was paid off and the toll removed. The road is preserved as a cultural heritage site and is classified as a National Tourist Route. It is a popular site to film automotive commercials, has been declared the world's best road trip, and been awarded the title as "Norwegian Construction of the Century". In 2009, the Atlantic Ocean Tunnel opened, connecting Averøy Municipality to the neighboring Kristiansund Municipality; together they form a second fixed link between the towns of Kristiansund and Molde.

== Route description ==
The road is a 8.274-kilometer (5.141 mi) long section of County Road 64 that connects the island of Averøya (in Averøy Municipality) with the mainland in Hustadvika Municipality. The road runs across an archipelago of partially inhabited islands and skerries. To the north lies Hustadvika, an unsheltered section of the Norwegian Sea, to the south Lauvøyfjorden. The road has a width of 6.5 meters (21 ft) and a maximum gradient of eight percent. It consists of eight bridges and four resting places and viewpoints. Several tourist sites, including dining, fishing and scuba diving resorts, have been established on the islands. Along with the section from Vevang to Bud, the road has been designated one of 18 National Tourist Routes.

The road begins at Utheim on Averøya, close to the village of Kårvåg. It runs onto the island of Kuholmen and then across the 115-meter (377 ft) long Little Lauvøysund Bridge onto the island of Lille Lauvøy. It continues across the 52-meter (171 ft) long Store Lauvholmen Bridge onto Store Lauvøy. Next it crosses the equally long Geitøysund Bridge to Geitøya, which features a viewpoint and parking. It then runs across Eldhusøya and Lyngholmen, before reaching Ildhusøya, where there are a resting place, parking and a viewpoint. Next is Storseisundet Bridge, a cantilever bridge 260 meters (850 ft) long. The municipal boundary between Eide and Averøy runs under the bridge. It then runs across Flatskjæret, where there is a viewpoint, before crossing onto Hulvågen via the three Hulvågen Bridges, which combined are 293-meter (961 ft) long. From there the road runs through Skarvøy and Strømsholmen, both with a resting place. The route reaches the mainland over the 119-meter (390 ft) long Vevangstraumen Bridge.

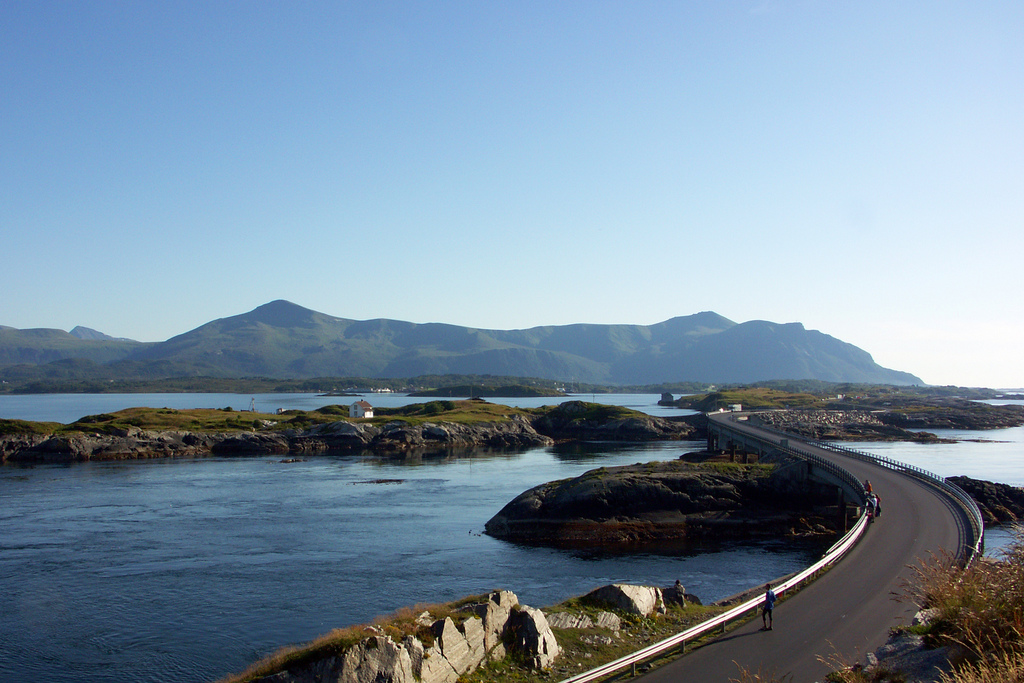
The Hulvågen Bridges looking towards the mainland

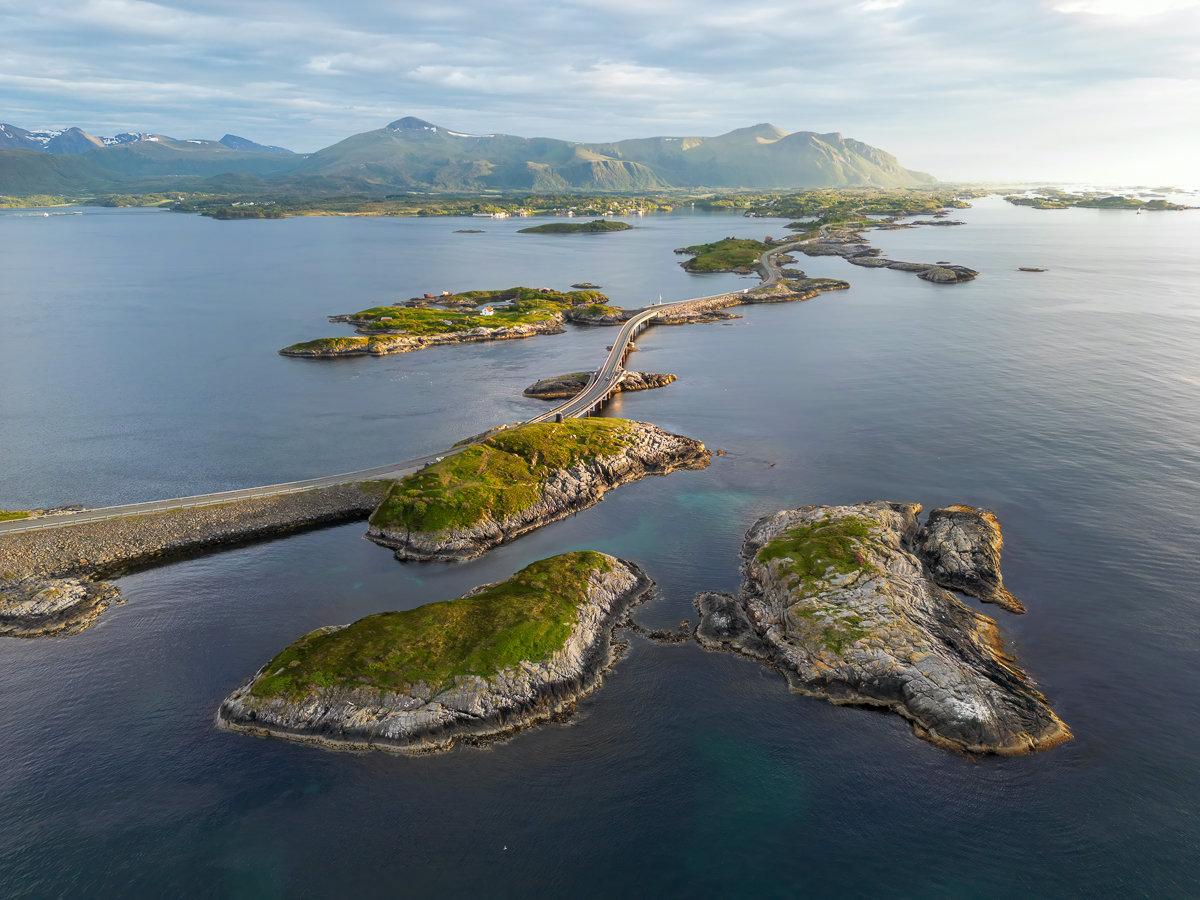
Aerial view of a part of the Atlantic Ocean Road, taken at midnight sun

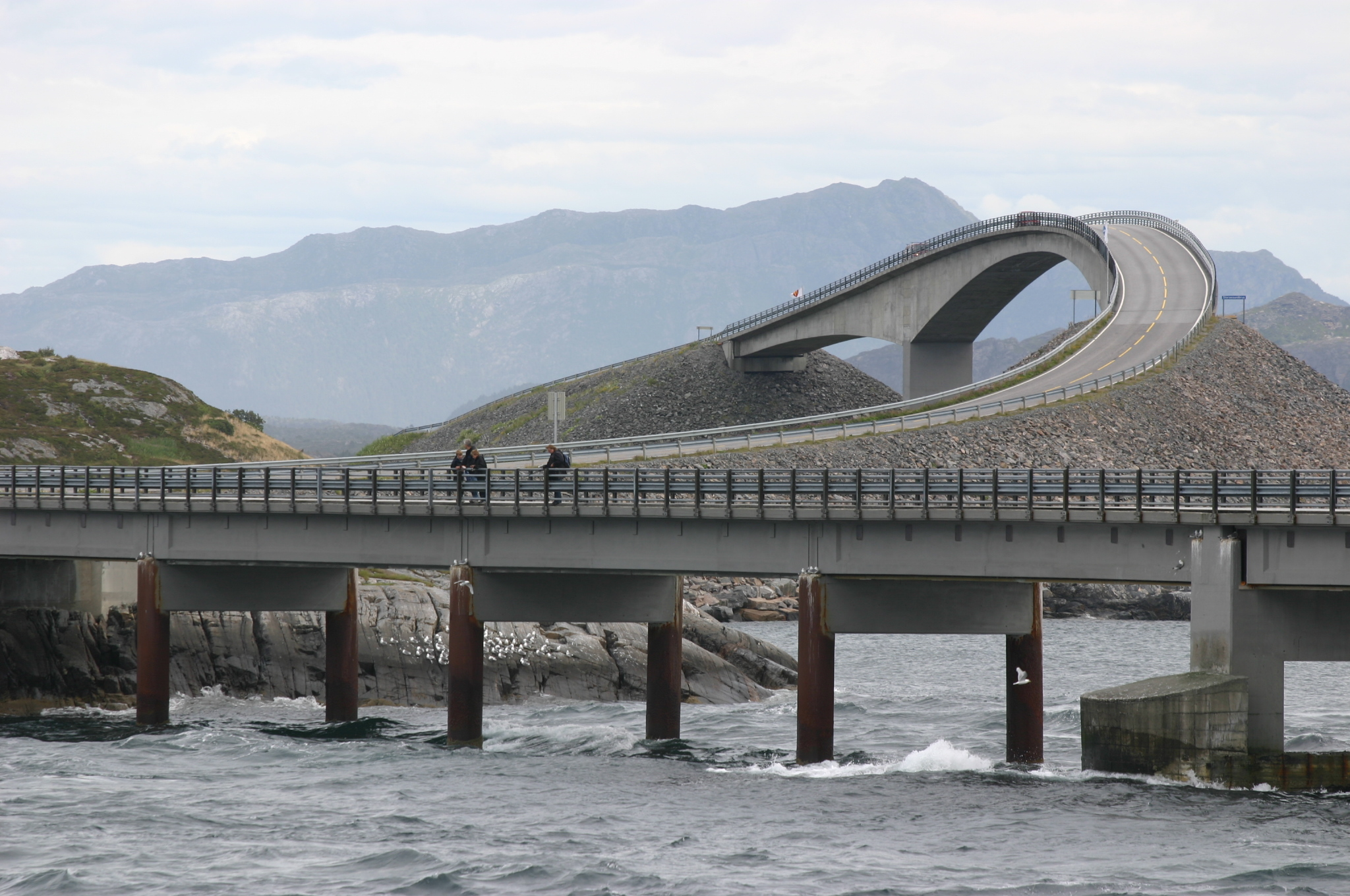
The Hulvågen Bridges with the Storseisundet Bridge in the background

== History ==
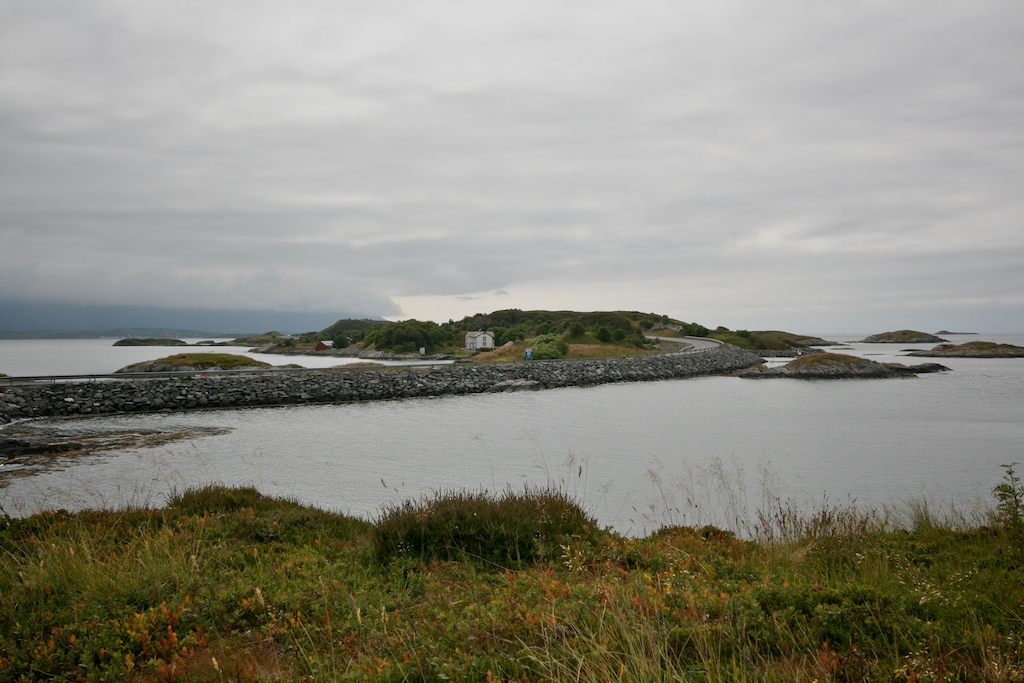
One of the route's causeways

The first proposals to use the route were made in the early 20th century. Planning of the Rauma Line to connect the national railway network to Møre og Romsdal was under way, and several proposals were made to extend it to the coastal towns. In 1921, Møre og Romsdal County Council chose the outer route, which would have followed a path close to that of the road. The Rauma Line was not built beyond Åndalsnes, and in 1935 the Parliament of Norway decided to connect the coastal towns in Møre og Romsdal to Åndalsnes by road instead of rail.

Although the plans were officially shelved, locals continued to work with the idea of a road connecting Averøy with the mainland. The toll company Atlanterhavsveien AS was established in 1970. Arne Rettedal, who was Minister of Local Government and Regional Development in the early 1980s, proposed that job creation funds could be allocated to road projects. The proposal was approved in 1983, after it had been supported by Averøy Municipality, Eide Municipality, and Fræna Municipality (Eide and Fræna merged in 2020 to create Hustadvika Municipality). Construction started as a municipal road project on 1 August 1983, but progressed slowly. From 1 July 1986, the Norwegian Public Roads Administration took over the project, speeding up construction and allowing it to open on 7 July 1989. During construction, the area was hit by 12 hurricanes. The opening of the road allowed the Tøvik–Ørjavik Ferry to be terminated.

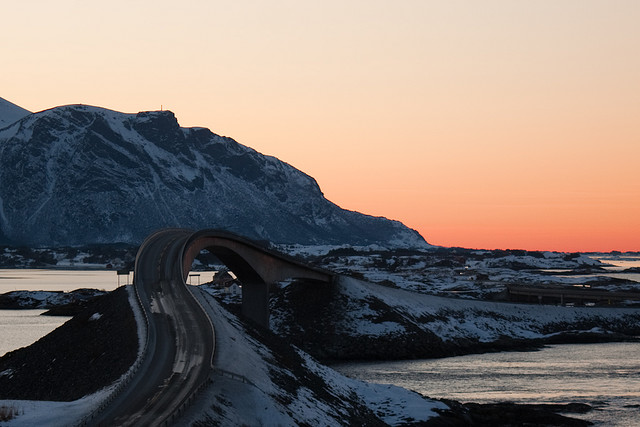
Storseisundet Bridge during winter

Construction cost 122 million kr and was financed 25 percent by debt to be recollected through tolls, 25 percent by job creation funds and 50 percent by ordinary state road grants. There was significant local opposition against toll financing, as few people believed it would be possible to pay off the road in the stipulated 15 years. However, by June 1999 the road was paid off and tolls removed. The accelerated amortization was caused both by greater than predicted local traffic and by large amounts of tourist traffic.

In 2009, the road was Norway's ninth-most-visited natural tourist attraction, with 258,654 visitors from May through August. The route won the title "Norwegian Construction of the Century", awarded by the Norwegian construction industry in 2005. In 2006, The Guardian declared it the world's best road trip. The road has become a popular place for the automotive industry to film advertisements; more than ten manufacturers have made television commercials along the route, often depicting the harsh weather. The Norwegian Directorate for Cultural Heritage preserved the road as a cultural heritage in December 2009. The Atlantic Ocean Tunnel between Averøy and Kristiansund opened on 19 December 2009. In combination with the road it provides a fixed link between Kristiansund and Molde. This is the second fixed link between the two towns, after the 1992 opening of the Kristiansund and Frei Fixed Link.

== Junctions ==
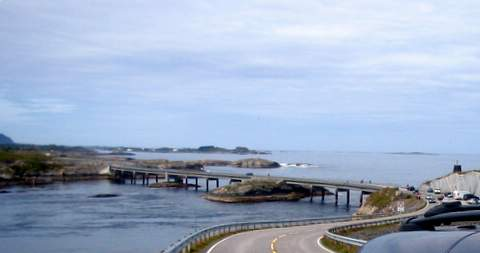
The three Hulvågen Bridges

The following is a list of bridges and major road junctions along the road. For bridges, it lists the name, overall length and clearance below; for junctions, the distance from the starting point and the name of the road it intersects with.

Municipality	km	Length	Clearance	Description
Averøy Municipality	0.000	—	—	Fv247
Averøy Municipality	—	115 m or 377 ft	7 m or 23 ft	Little Lauvøysund Bridge
Averøy Municipality	—	52 m or 171 ft	3 m or 10 ft	Store Lauvøysund Bridge
Averøy Municipality	—	52 m or 171 ft	6 m or 20 ft	Geitøysund Bridge
Averøy Municipality	—	260 m or 850 ft	23 m or 75 ft	Storseisundet Bridge
Hustadvika Municipality	—	260 m or 850 ft	23 m or 75 ft	Storseisundet Bridge
Hustadvika Municipality	—	293 m or 961 ft	4 m or 13 ft	Hulvågen Bridges
Hustadvika Municipality	—	119 m or 390 ft	10 m or 33 ft	Vevangstraumen Bridge
Hustadvika Municipality	8.274	—	—	Fv663
