= Kårvåg =

Village in Averøy Municipality, Norway

- Village
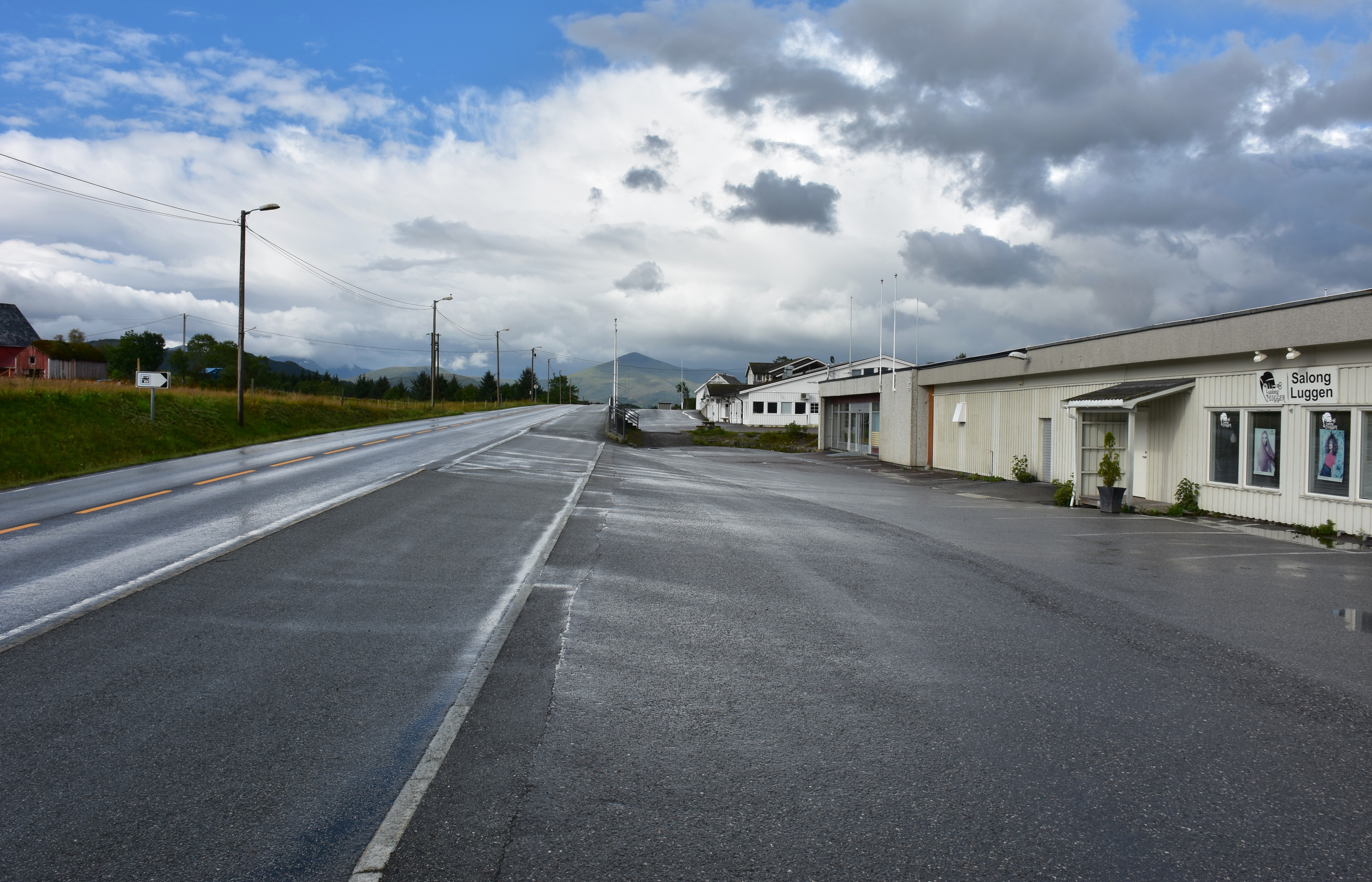
- View of the village area
- Interactive map of Kårvåg
- Location within Møre og Romsdal Location within Norway
- Coordinates: 63.0138°N 7.4454°E
- Country: Norway
- Region: Western Norway
- County: Møre og Romsdal
- District: Nordmøre
- Municipality: Averøy Municipality

Area
  - Total: 0.35 km^{2} (0.14 sq mi)
- Elevation: 24 m (79 ft)

Population (2024)
  - Total: 329
  - Density: 940/km^{2} (2,400/sq mi)
- Time zone: UTC+01:00 (CET)
  - Summer (DST): UTC+02:00 (CEST)
- Post Code: 6530 Averøy

Kårvåg is a village in Averøy Municipality in Møre og Romsdal county, Norway. It is located on the west side of the island of Averøya near the east end of the Atlanterhavsveien road. The village of Kornstad lies to the south and the village of Langøyneset is to the north.

The 0.35-square-kilometre (86-acre) village has a population (2024) of 329 and a population density of 940 inhabitants per square kilometre (2,400/sq mi).
