= Hestskjær Lighthouse =

Coastal lighthouse in Averøy, Norway

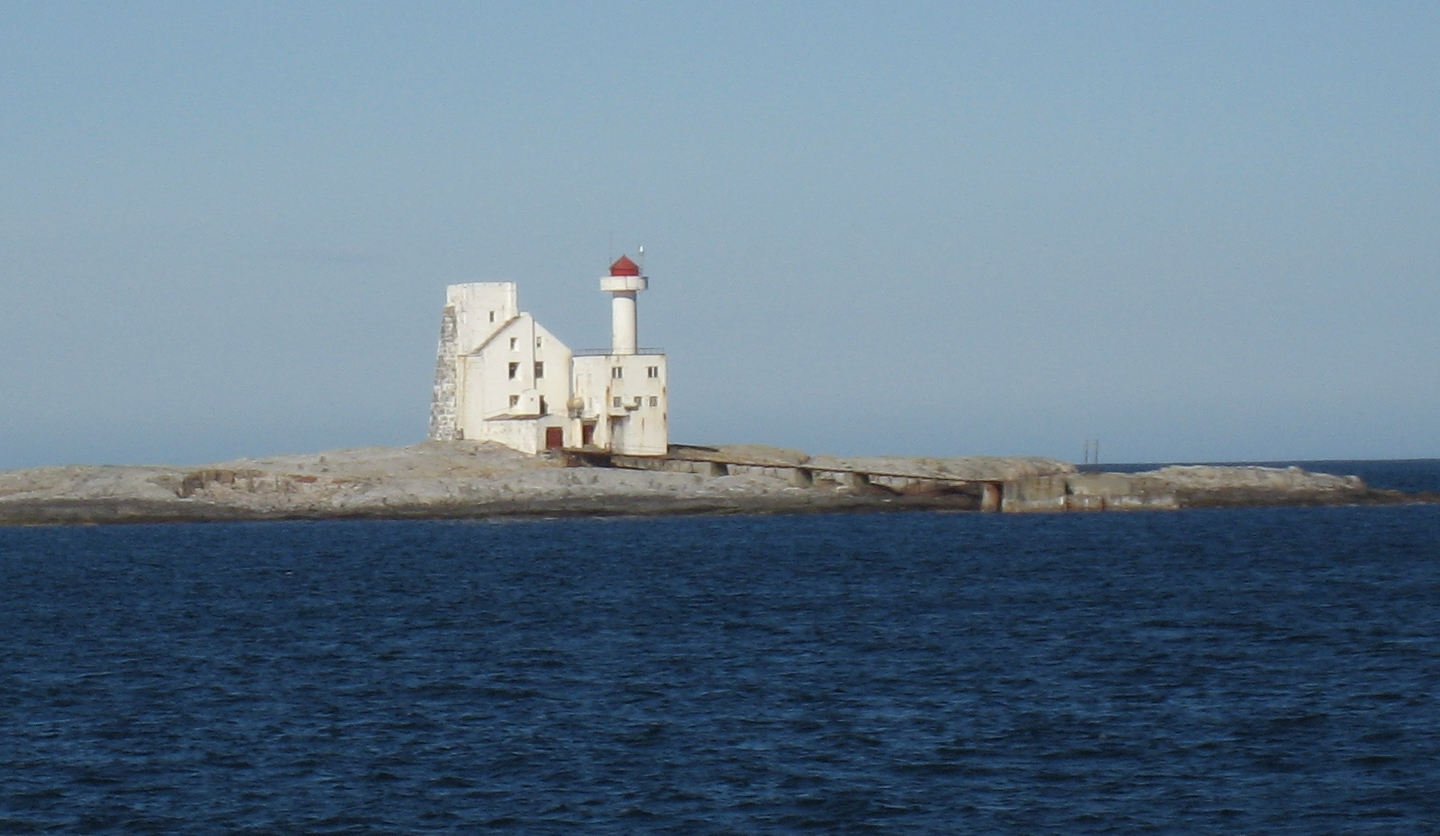
- Hestskjær Lighthouse
- Location: Hestskjær, Langøyneset, Averøy Municipality, Norway
- Coordinates: 63°05′04″N 7°29′32″E

Tower
- Construction: concrete
- Automated: 1986
- Height: 21 m (69 ft)
- Shape: cylinder
- Markings: white (tower), red (lantern)
- Heritage: cultural heritage preservation in Norway
- Racon: K

Light
- First lit: 1986
- Focal height: 24 m (79 ft)
- Intensity: 28,200 candela
- Range: 15 nmi (28 km; 17 mi)
- Characteristic: Oc(2) WRG 8s
- Original light
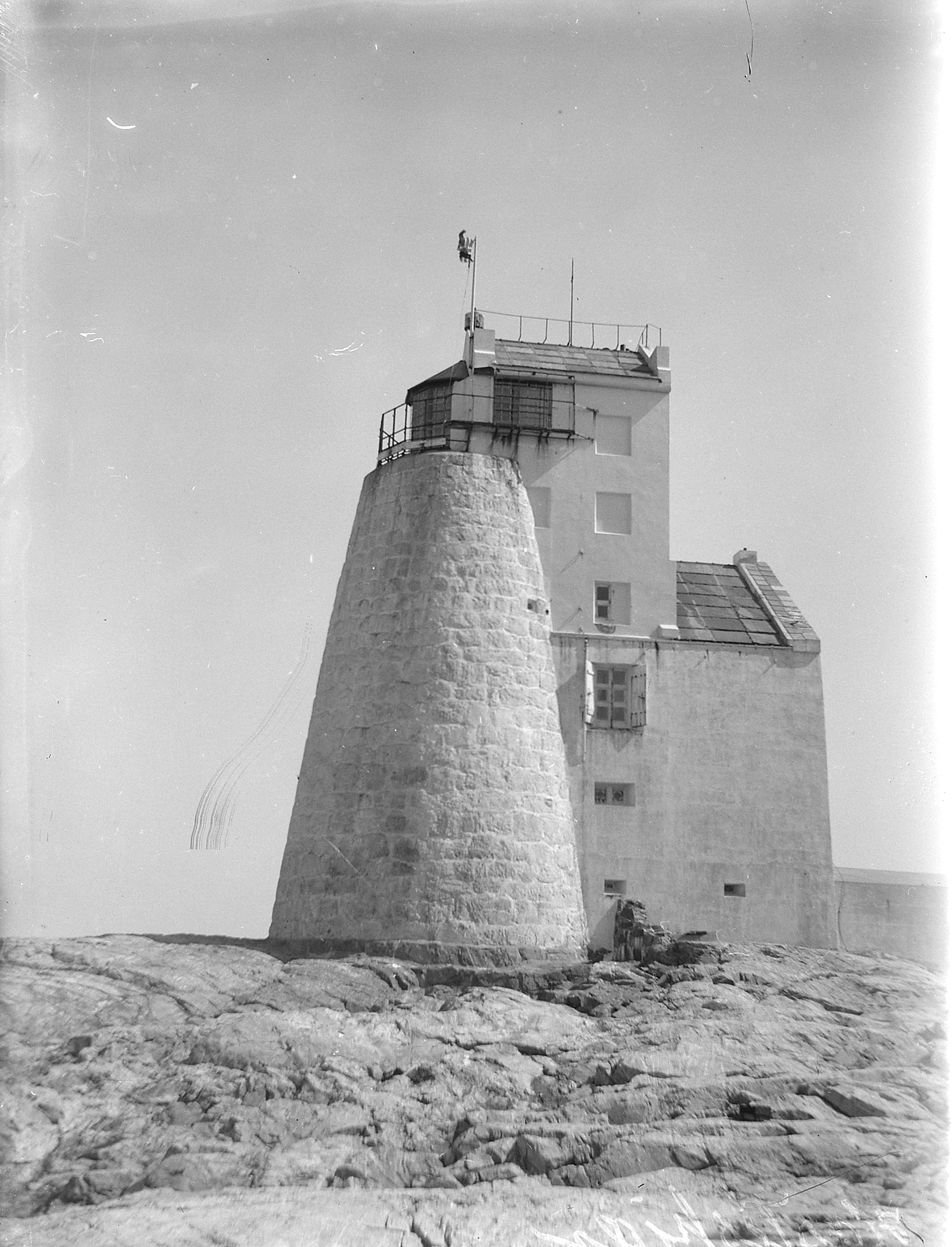
- Constructed: 1879
- Height: 20 m (66 ft)
- Shape: square
- Markings: white
- Heritage: cultural heritage preservation in Norway

Hestskjær Lighthouse (Norwegian: Hestskjær fyr) is a coastal lighthouse located in Averøy Municipality in Møre og Romsdal county, Norway. It is located on a small island about 2 kilometres (1.2 mi) north of the village of Langøy. The lighthouse was established in 1879 and automated in 1986.

The 21-metre (69 ft) tall lighthouse emits a white, red, or green light (depending on direction) occulting twice every 8 seconds. The tower is a round, cylindrical tower that is white with a red top. The 28,200 candela light can be seen for up to 15 nautical miles (28 km; 17 mi).

== World War II ==
On 13 February 1944, the two ships SS Irma and SS Henry were sunk near Hestskjær.

== See also ==
- List of lighthouses in Norway
- Lighthouses in Norway
