= Kornstad Municipality =

Former municipality in Norway

Kornstad Municipality Kornstad herred
- Former municipality
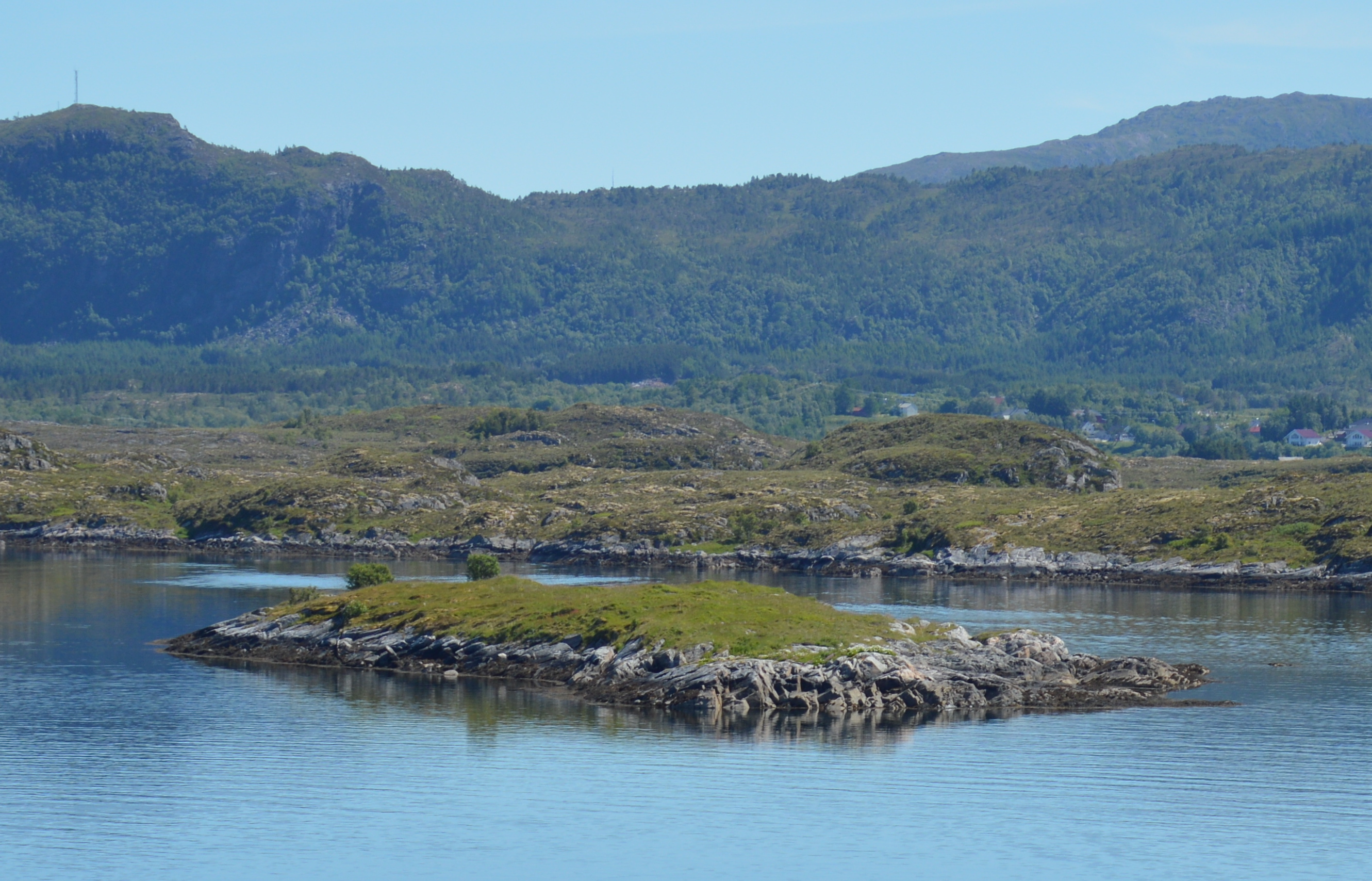
- View of Fånytta (looking south) in northern Kornstad

- Møre og Romsdal within Norway

- Kornstad within Møre og Romsdal
- Coordinates: 62°57′53″N 07°27′10″E
- Country: Norway
- County: Møre og Romsdal
- District: Nordmøre
- Established: 1 Jan 1897
  - Preceded by: Kvernes Municipality
- Disestablished: 1 Jan 1964
  - Succeeded by: Averøy Municipality
- Administrative centre: Kornstad

Government
  - Mayor (1945–1963): Olav Fagereng (Ap)

Area (upon dissolution)
  - Total: 66.2 km^{2} (25.6 sq mi)
  - Rank: #564 in Norway
- Highest elevation: 635 m (2,083 ft)

Population (1963)
  - Total: 1,921
  - Rank: #453 in Norway
  - Density: 29/km^{2} (75/sq mi)
  - Change (10 years): ▲ +6.1%
- Demonym: Kornstad-folk

Official language
  - Norwegian form: Neutral
- Time zone: UTC+01:00 (CET)
  - Summer (DST): UTC+02:00 (CEST)
- ISO 3166 code: NO-1552

Kornstad is a former municipality in Møre og Romsdal county, Norway. The municipality existed from 1897 until its dissolution in 1964. The 66-square-kilometre (25 sq mi) municipality encompassed the western part oft the present-day Averøy Municipality on the island of Averøya, plus a small area in the present-day Hustadvika Municipality on the mainland Romsdal Peninsula to the west of the island. The administrative centre of the municipality was the village of Kornstad where Kornstad Church is located.

Prior to its dissolution in 1964, the 66.2-square-kilometre (25.6 sq mi) municipality was the 564th largest by area out of the 689 municipalities in Norway. Kornstad Municipality was the 453rd most populous municipality in Norway with a population of about 1,921. The municipality's population density was 29 inhabitants per square kilometre (75/sq mi) and its population had increased by 6.1% over the previous 10-year period.

== General information ==
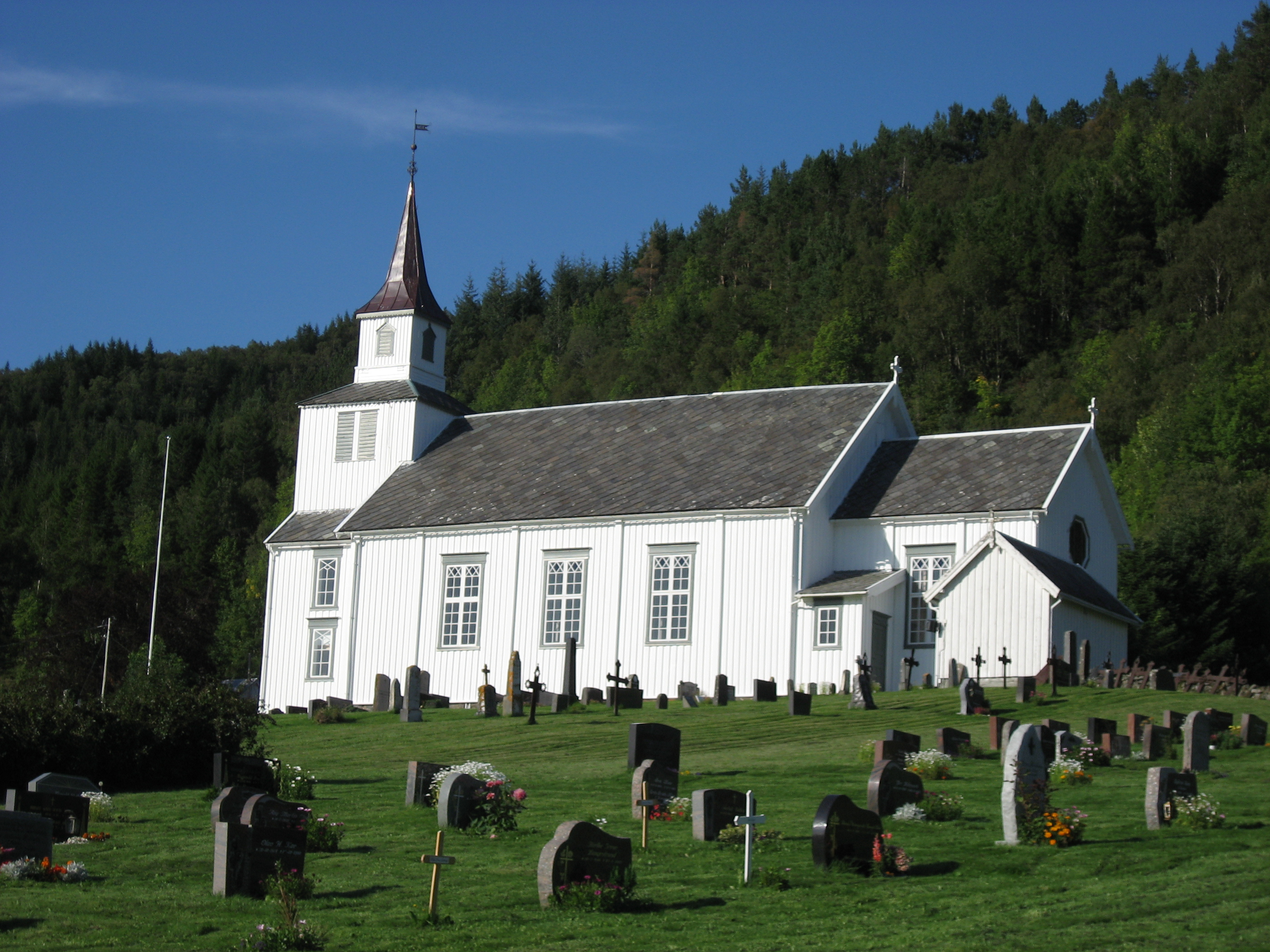
View of the Kornstad Church

The municipality of Kornstad was established on 1 January 1897 when the large Kvernes Municipality was divided into four new municipalities: Eide Municipality (population: 1,552) in the west, Kornstad Municipality (population: 1,599) in the central part, Bremsnes Municipality (population: 2,917) in the north, and (a much smaller) Kvernes Municipality (population: 857) in the southeast.

During the 1960s, there were many municipal mergers across Norway due to the work of the Schei Committee. On 1 January 1964, the mainland district surrounding the village of Vevang (population: 562) was transferred into the neighboring Eide Municipality and the rest of Kornstad Municipality (population: 1,356) was merged with Kvernes Municipality (population: 693) and most of Bremsnes Municipality (population: 3,153) to create the new Averøy Municipality.

=== Name ===
The municipality (originally the parish) is named after the old Kornstad farm (Old Norse: Kornastaðir) since the first Kornstad Church was built there. The meaning of the first element is a little uncertain. It may come from the old male name Korni or it could be a shortened version of íkorni which means "squirrel". The last element is the plural form of staðr which means "place" or "village".

=== Churches ===
The Church of Norway had one parish (sokn) within Kornstad Municipality. At the time of the municipal dissolution, it was part of the Kvernes prestegjeld and the Ytre Nordmøre prosti (deanery) in the Diocese of Nidaros.

Churches in Kornstad Municipality
Parish (sokn)	Church name	Location of the church	Year built
Kornstad	Kornstad Church	Kornstad	1871

== Geography ==
The municipality was located on the southwestern coast of the island of Averøya, plus a small area on the mainland, along the Kornstadfjorden. Bremsnes Municipality was located to the northeast, Kvernes Municipality was to the east, and Eide Municipality was to the west (across the fjord). The highest point in the municipality was the 635-metre (2,083 ft) tall mountain Holstuva, on the border of Bremsnes Municipality.

== Government ==
While it existed, Kornstad Municipality was responsible for primary education (through 10th grade), outpatient health services, senior citizen services, welfare and other social services, zoning, economic development, and municipal roads and utilities. The municipality was governed by a municipal council of directly elected representatives. The mayor was indirectly elected by a vote of the municipal council. The municipality was under the jurisdiction of the Frostating Court of Appeal.

=== Municipal council ===
The municipal council (Herredsstyre) of Kornstad Municipality was made up of 17 representatives that were elected to four-year terms. The tables below show the historical composition of the council by political party.

Kornstad herredsstyre 1959–1963
Party name (in Norwegian)	Number of representatives
Labour Party (Arbeiderpartiet)	5
Christian Democratic Party (Kristelig Folkeparti)	5
Local List(s) (Lokale lister)	7
Total number of members:	17

Kornstad herredsstyre 1955–1959
Party name (in Norwegian)	Number of representatives
Labour Party (Arbeiderpartiet)	4
Christian Democratic Party (Kristelig Folkeparti)	6
Farmers' Party (Bondepartiet)	3
Local List(s) (Lokale lister)	4
Total number of members:	17

Kornstad herredsstyre 1951–1955
Party name (in Norwegian)	Number of representatives
Labour Party (Arbeiderpartiet)	4
Christian Democratic Party (Kristelig Folkeparti)	5
Farmers' Party (Bondepartiet)	3
Local List(s) (Lokale lister)	4
Total number of members:	16

Kornstad herredsstyre 1947–1951
Party name (in Norwegian)	Number of representatives
Labour Party (Arbeiderpartiet)	5
Christian Democratic Party (Kristelig Folkeparti)	5
Joint List(s) of Non-Socialist Parties (Borgerlige Felleslister)	2
Local List(s) (Lokale lister)	4
Total number of members:	16

Kornstad herredsstyre 1945–1947
Party name (in Norwegian)	Number of representatives
Labour Party (Arbeiderpartiet)	6
Christian Democratic Party (Kristelig Folkeparti)	4
Local List(s) (Lokale lister)	6
Total number of members:	16

Kornstad herredsstyre 1937–1941*
Party name (in Norwegian)	Number of representatives
Labour Party (Arbeiderpartiet)	5
List of workers, fishermen, and small farmholders (Arbeidere, fiskere, småbrukere liste)	1
Local List(s) (Lokale lister)	10
Total number of members:	16
Note: Due to the German occupation of Norway during World War II, no elections were held for new municipal councils until after the war ended in 1945.

=== Mayors ===
The mayor (Norwegian: ordfører) of Kornstad Municipality was the political leader of the municipality and the chairperson of the municipal council. The following people have held this position:

- 1897–1897: Jakob Løvø
- 1898–1902: Peder Utheim
- 1902–1904: M. Kristvik
- 1905–1919: Ole J. Løvø
- 1920–1925: Ole Kaarvaag
- 1925–1931: Ole J. Løvø (SmP)
- 1931–1934: Søren Slatlem (Bp)
- 1934–1941: Sigurd Strømsholm
- 1942–1943: Peder Eide (NS)
- 1943–1944: Ole O. Kårvåg (NS)
- 1945–1945: Sigurd Strømsholm
- 1945–1963: Olav Fagereng (Ap)

== See also ==
- List of former municipalities of Norway
