= Leif Helge Kongshaug =

Norwegian politician

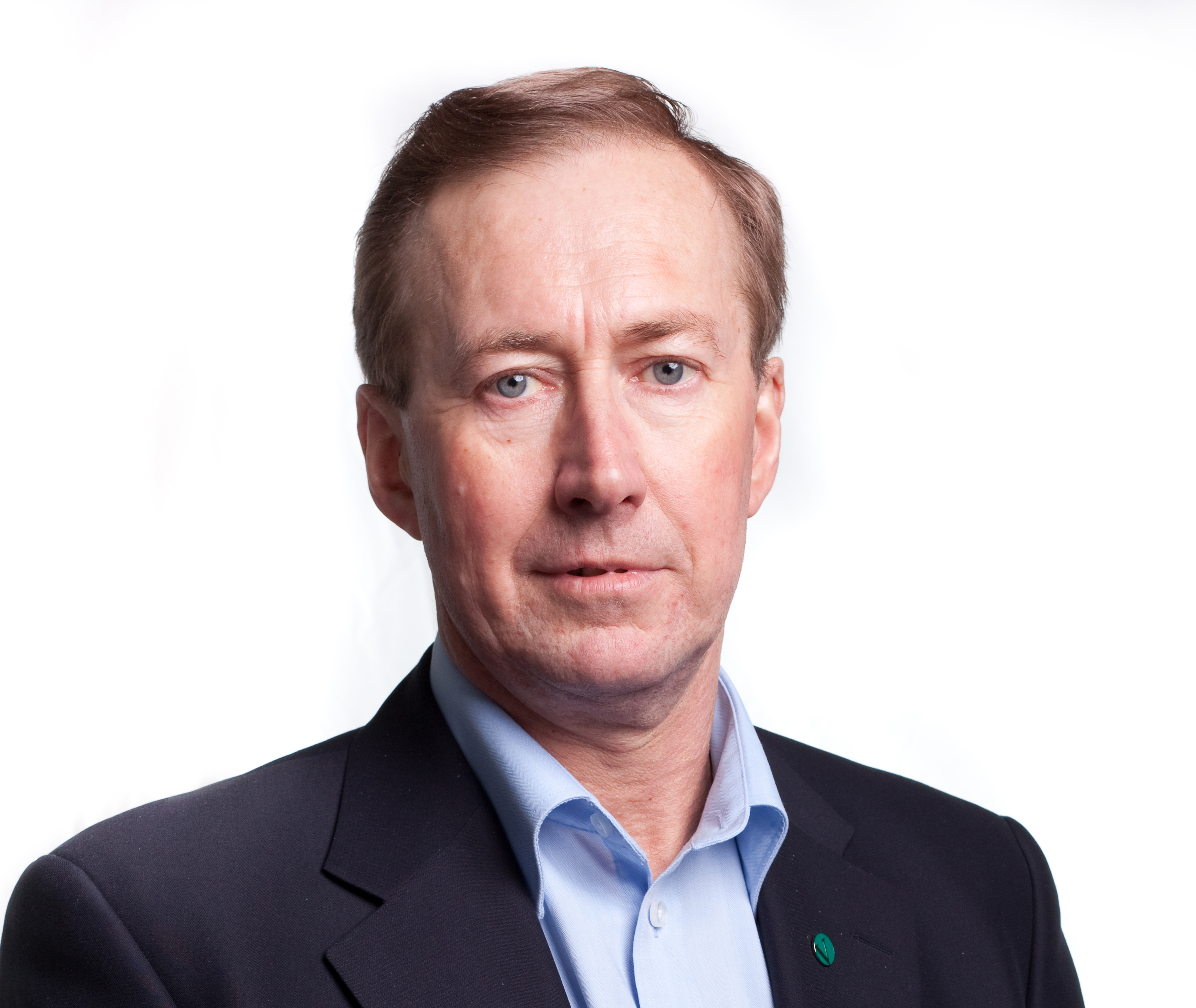

Member of the Norwegian Parliament
- In office 1997–2001

State Secretary in the Ministry of Agriculture and Food
- Incumbent
- Assumed office Second cabinet Bondevik

Member of the Norwegian Parliament
- Incumbent
- Assumed office 2005

Mayor of Averøy Municipality
- Incumbent
- Assumed office 1986

Member of Averøy Municipal Council
- In office 1979–1997

Personal details
- Born: July 31, 1949 (age 76) Averøya, Norway
- Party: Liberal Party
- Occupation: Politician, Teacher, Counselor, Farmer

Leif Helge Kongshaug (born 31 July 1949 in Averøya) is a Norwegian politician for the Liberal Party.

He was elected to the Norwegian Parliament from Møre og Romsdal in 1997, but not re-elected in 2001. During the second cabinet Bondevik, Kongshaug was appointed State Secretary in the Ministry of Agriculture and Food. He was re-elected to a second parliamentary term in 2005.

On the local level he was a member of the municipal council of Averøy Municipality from 1979 to 1997, serving as mayor from 1986.

Outside politics he has worked as a school teacher, counselor, and farmer.
