= Langøyneset =

Village in Averøy Municipality, Norway

Langøyneset Langøya
- Village
- Interactive map of Langøyneset
- Location within Møre og Romsdal Location within Norway
- Coordinates: 63°03′50″N 07°29′50″E
- Country: Norway
- Region: Western Norway
- County: Møre og Romsdal
- District: Nordmøre
- Municipality: Averøy Municipality

Area
  - Total: 0.65 km^{2} (0.25 sq mi)
- Elevation: 10 m (33 ft)

Population (2012)
  - Total: 359
  - Density: 552/km^{2} (1,430/sq mi)
- Time zone: UTC+01:00 (CET)
  - Summer (DST): UTC+02:00 (CEST)
- Post Code: 6530 Averøy

Langøyneset is a village in Averøy Municipality in Møre og Romsdal county, Norway. It is located on the northern part of the island of Averøya and mainly on the small island of Langøya, off the northern coast of the main island of Averøya. The village is west of the village of Bremsnes and northeast of the village of Kårvåg. The Langøy Chapel is located here.

The 0.65-square-kilometre (160-acre) village had a population (2012) of 359 and a population density of 552 inhabitants per square kilometre (1,430/sq mi). Since 2012, the population and area data for this village area has not been separately tracked by Statistics Norway.

The Hestskjær Lighthouse lies about 2 kilometres (1.2 mi) north of this village.
