= SS Henry =

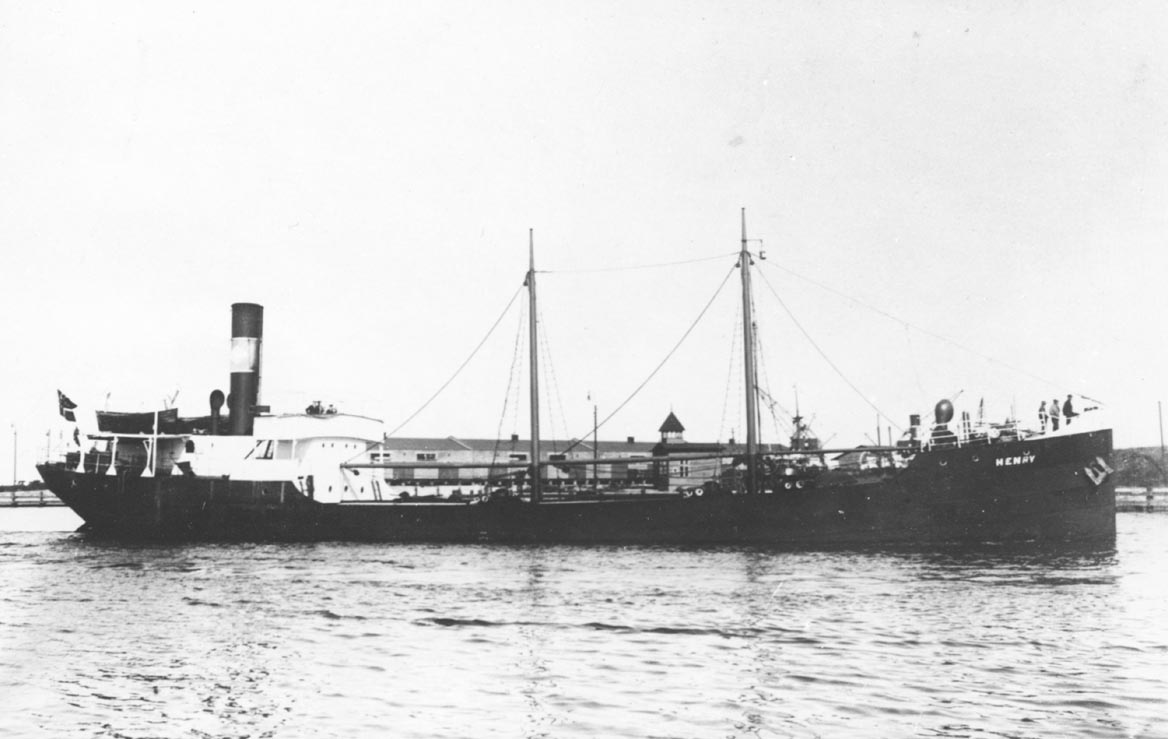

History

Sweden
- Name: Wasa
- Owner: Ångfartygs-A/B Nornan
- Port of registry: Gothenburg
- Builder: Eriksbergs Mekaniska Verkstad, Gothenburg, Sweden
- Yard number: 132
- Launched: 1907
- Completed: June 1907
- Fate: Sold to Egil Krogh in 1925

Norway
- Name: Henry
- Owner: Egil Krogh
- Port of registry: Haugesund
- Acquired: 1925
- Out of service: 13 February 1944
- Fate: Sunk by Royal Norwegian Navy MTBs

General characteristics
- Tonnage: 628 GRT
- Beam: 8.6 m (28.22 ft)
- Propulsion: Steam engine
- Notes: All the above listed information, unless otherwise noted, was acquired from

SS Henry was a Norwegian steam-powered cargo ship best known for being one of the two ships sunk in one of the most controversial incidents in Norway during the Second World War.

== Before the Second World War ==
Henry was built in 1907 for the Swedish company Ångfartygs-A/B Nornan of Gothenburg. She sailed for her original owner until she was sold to Egil Krogh in Norway in 1925. After she was sold to the Norwegian company her tonnage was changed from 604 to 628 gross tons. Following the German invasion of Norway in 1940 she came under German overall control, continuing to sail along the coast of occupied Norway.

== Sinking ==
In the evening of 13 February 1944 Henry was sailing along the coast near Hustadvika Bay by Hestskjær Lighthouse off the port of Kristiansund in Møre og Romsdal county. She was carrying a cargo of rocks from the Aust-Agder town of Risør northwards along the coastline. In addition to the Norwegians on board Henry she carried four German Army Gefreiters. At 1837hrs the SS Irma, a Hurtigruten passenger ship that had just overtaken Henry, was struck and sunk by what later turned out to be torpedoes fired from MTB 627, a Royal Norwegian Navy Motor Torpedo Boat. As Henry launched two of her lifeboats she too was torpedoed, by the other Royal Norwegian Navy Motor Torpedo Boat present, MTB 653. One of the two lifeboats were brought ashore at Hestskjær Lighthouse by the lighthouse keeper and later brought into Kristiansund.

Two of Henry's crewmen were lost in the ship's sinking, her captain John Olav Gustav Dommersnes and the stoker Johan Wåge Larsen.

The loss of the two civilian Norwegian ships were utilised heavily in propaganda by the Germans and the Norwegian national socialist collaborator party Nasjonal Samling. One of the main uses of the incident in Nazi propaganda was in a recruitment drive aimed at convincing Norwegian sailors to join the German Kriegsmarine. The Nazi propaganda machinery blamed the British Royal Navy for sinking Henry and Irma, it only becoming known after the war that Royal Norwegian Navy vessels were behind the operation that sank the two ships.

== Controversy ==
The sinking of Irma and Henry has been controversial ever since the Second World War, with disagreements over the exact nature of the events. The Royal Norwegian Navy remains adamant that Irma and Henry were without lights or national markings and were sailing as a convoy escorted by a German naval trawler. This has been disputed by the survivors of Irma and Henry.

The MTB crews also claimed that Henry took evasive action after Irma was hit, while the survivors claimed that she had stopped to launch two of her lifeboats to assist the survivors from Irma when she herself was hit and sunk.

One explanation for the presence of the naval trawler reported by the crews of MTB 627 and MTB 653 has been fronted by several researchers. In the Hustadvika area was a small tugboat, the Hopplafjord, which rescued survivors after the sinking of the two ships. Hopplafjord, being similar to a naval trawler in size and profile, may have been misinterpreted as an escort vessel by the MTB commander.

== Post-war memorial ==
Henry was honoured together with Irma 16 September 2002 when King Harald V of Norway unveiled a monument to the people lost on the two ships, and led a memorial ceremony at sea near the site of the 1944 sinking of the two vessels.

== Literature ==
- Hegland, Jon Rustung (1989). Angrep i skjærgården – Norske motortorpedobåters operasjoner fra Shetland 1941–1945 (in Norwegian). Oslo: Dreyers Forlag A/S. ISBN 82-09-10533-7.
- Hegland, Jon Rustung; Johan Henrik Lilleheim (1998). Norske torpedobåter gjennom 125 år – MTB våpenets 125 års jubileumsbok 1873–1998 (in Norwegian). Hundvåg: Norsk Tidsskrift for Sjøvesen. ISBN 82-994738-1-0.
- Voksø, Per (1994). Krigens Dagbok – Norge 1940–1945 (in Norwegian). Oslo: Forlaget Det Beste. ISBN 82-7010-245-8.
