= Averøy Municipality =

Municipality in Møre og Romsdal, Norway

Averøy Municipality Averøy kommune
- Municipality
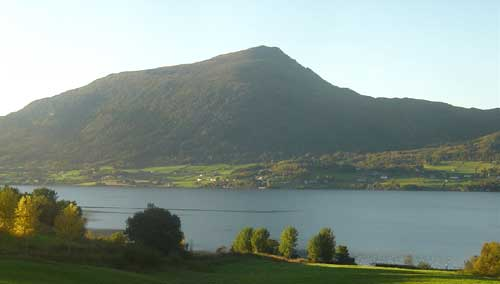
- View of Mekknoken in Averøy

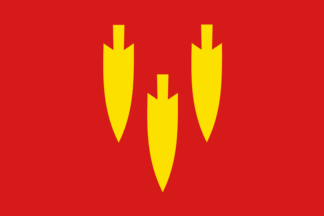
- Flag Coat of arms

- Møre og Romsdal within Norway

- Averøy within Møre og Romsdal
- Coordinates: 62°59′50″N 07°33′19″E
- Country: Norway
- County: Møre og Romsdal
- District: Nordmøre
- Established: 1 Jan 1964
  - Preceded by: Kvernes, Kornstad, and Bremsnes
- Administrative centre: Bruhagen

Government
  - Mayor (2015): Ingrid Ovidie Rangønes (Ap)

Area
  - Total: 175.7 km^{2} (67.8 sq mi)
  - Land: 172.9 km^{2} (66.8 sq mi)
  - Water: 2.8 km^{2} (1.1 sq mi) 1.6%
  - Rank: #313 in Norway
- Highest elevation: 751.03 m (2,464.0 ft)

Population (2024)
  - Total: 5,955
  - Rank: #163 in Norway
  - Density: 33.9/km^{2} (88/sq mi)
  - Change (10 years): ▲ +4.7%
- Demonym: Averøying

Official language
  - Norwegian form: Neutral
- Time zone: UTC+01:00 (CET)
  - Summer (DST): UTC+02:00 (CEST)
- ISO 3166 code: NO-1554
- Website: Official website

Averøy is a municipality in Møre og Romsdal county, Norway. It is part of the region of Nordmøre. The administrative centre of the municipality is the village of Bruhagen. Other villages in the municipality include Bremsnes, Kornstad, Kvernes, Kårvåg, Langøyneset, Sveggen, and Vebenstad.

The 176-square-kilometre (68 sq mi) municipality is the 313th largest by area out of the 357 municipalities in Norway. Averøy Municipality is the 163rd most populous municipality in Norway with a population of 5,955. The municipality's population density is 33.9 inhabitants per square kilometre (88/sq mi) and its population has increased by 4.7% over the previous 10-year period.

The municipality includes the main island of Averøya and the many small islands surrounding it. The Kornstadfjorden, Kvernesfjorden, and Bremsnesfjorden surround the municipality on three sides and the open ocean on the fourth side. The Hestskjær Lighthouse and Stavnes Lighthouse are located in the northern part of the municipality.

== General information ==
View of northwestern Averøy

The municipality of Averøy was established on 1 January 1964 when all of Kvernes Municipality (population: 693), most of Kornstad Municipality (population: 1,356), and most of Bremsnes Municipality (population: 3,153) were merged to form the new Averøy Municipality. On 1 January 1983, the small island of Eldhusøya and the small surrounding islands were transferred from Eide Municipality to Averøy Municipality.

=== Name ===
The municipality is named after the island of Averøya (historically called Averøy; Old Norse: Afrey) since it is the main island in the municipality. The first element is unknown, but it could possibly come from afr which means "great" or "big". The last element comes from the word ey which means "island".

=== Coat of arms ===
The coat of arms was granted on 4 April 1986. The official blazon is "Gules, three downwards-pointing arrowheads Or" (Norwegian: I rødt tre nedvendte gull pilspisser). This means the arms have a red field (background) and the charge is three downwards-pointing arrowheads. The CHARGE has a tincture of Or which means it is commonly colored yellow, but if it is made out of metal, then gold is used. The arrowheads refer to actual Stone Age arrowheads, made of slate, which have been found in the municipality. The arrowheads thus symbolize the long time that the area has been inhabited. The arms were designed by Jarle Skuseth after an idea by Kristoffer Gjøten. The municipal flag has the same design as the coat of arms.

=== Churches ===
The Church of Norway has three parishes (sokn) within Averøy Municipality. It is part of the Ytre Nordmøre deanery in the Diocese of Møre.

Churches in Averøy Municipality
Parish (sokn)	Church name	Location of the church	Year built
Kvernes	Kvernes Church	Kvernes	1893
Kvernes	Kvernes Stave Church	Kvernes	14th century
Kornstad	Kornstad Church	Kornstad	1871
Bremsnes	Bremsnes Church	Bremsnes	1771
Bremsnes	Langøy Chapel	Langøyneset	1935

== History ==
The municipality of Averøy has many historic landmarks, like the Bremsnes cave with Mesolithic findings from the Fosna culture. Langøyneset, now a remote fishing community, was once a bustling port along the main coastal route, and the site of the Compromise of 1040 between King Magnus I and the farmers along the coast. Also, the Medieval Kvernes Stave Church (built around 1300–1350).

== Geography ==
The municipality includes the main island of Averøya plus many smaller surrounding islands. Kristiansund Municipality lies to the east, Gjemnes Municipality is to the south, and Hustadvika Municipality is to the west. The highest point in the municipality is the 751.03-metre (2,464.0 ft) tall mountain Mekknøken, near the southern shore of the island of Averøya.

== Government ==
Averøy Municipality is responsible for primary education (through 10th grade), outpatient health services, senior citizen services, welfare and other social services, zoning, economic development, and municipal roads and utilities. The municipality is governed by a municipal council of directly elected representatives. The mayor is indirectly elected by a vote of the municipal council. The municipality is under the jurisdiction of the Nordmøre og Romsdal District Court and the Frostating Court of Appeal. Waste management was provided by the inter-municipal agency Nordmøre Interkommunale Renovasjonsselskap until 2020, after which it merged into ReMidt. Waste collection has since 2018 been operated by ReTrans Midt.

=== Municipal council ===
The municipal council (Kommunestyre) of Averøy Municipality is made up of 23 representatives that are elected to four year terms. The tables below show the current and historical composition of the council by political party.

Averøy kommunestyre 2023–2027
Party name (in Norwegian)	Number of representatives
Labour Party (Arbeiderpartiet)	10
Progress Party (Fremskrittspartiet)	4
Conservative Party (Høyre)	3
Christian Democratic Party (Kristelig Folkeparti)	1
Centre Party (Senterpartiet)	2
Socialist Left Party (Sosialistisk Venstreparti)	1
Liberal Party (Venstre)	2
Total number of members:	23

Averøy kommunestyre 2019–2023
Party name (in Norwegian)	Number of representatives
Labour Party (Arbeiderpartiet)	12
Progress Party (Fremskrittspartiet)	3
Conservative Party (Høyre)	1
Christian Democratic Party (Kristelig Folkeparti)	1
Centre Party (Senterpartiet)	3
Socialist Left Party (Sosialistisk Venstreparti)	1
Liberal Party (Venstre)	2
Total number of members:	23

Averøy kommunestyre 2015–2019
Party name (in Norwegian)	Number of representatives
Labour Party (Arbeiderpartiet)	9
Progress Party (Fremskrittspartiet)	4
Conservative Party (Høyre)	2
Christian Democratic Party (Kristelig Folkeparti)	2
Centre Party (Senterpartiet)	3
Socialist Left Party (Sosialistisk Venstreparti)	1
Liberal Party (Venstre)	6
Total number of members:	27

Averøy kommunestyre 2011–2015
Party name (in Norwegian)	Number of representatives
Labour Party (Arbeiderpartiet)	8
Progress Party (Fremskrittspartiet)	5
Conservative Party (Høyre)	3
Christian Democratic Party (Kristelig Folkeparti)	2
Centre Party (Senterpartiet)	4
Socialist Left Party (Sosialistisk Venstreparti)	1
Liberal Party (Venstre)	4
Total number of members:	27

Averøy kommunestyre 2007–2011
Party name (in Norwegian)	Number of representatives
Labour Party (Arbeiderpartiet)	6
Progress Party (Fremskrittspartiet)	6
Conservative Party (Høyre)	2
Christian Democratic Party (Kristelig Folkeparti)	2
Centre Party (Senterpartiet)	3
Socialist Left Party (Sosialistisk Venstreparti)	1
Liberal Party (Venstre)	7
Total number of members:	27

Averøy kommunestyre 2003–2007
Party name (in Norwegian)	Number of representatives
Labour Party (Arbeiderpartiet)	8
Progress Party (Fremskrittspartiet)	3
Conservative Party (Høyre)	3
Christian Democratic Party (Kristelig Folkeparti)	2
Centre Party (Senterpartiet)	7
Socialist Left Party (Sosialistisk Venstreparti)	2
Liberal Party (Venstre)	2
Total number of members:	27

Averøy kommunestyre 1999–2003
Party name (in Norwegian)	Number of representatives
Labour Party (Arbeiderpartiet)	12
Progress Party (Fremskrittspartiet)	3
Conservative Party (Høyre)	4
Christian Democratic Party (Kristelig Folkeparti)	4
Centre Party (Senterpartiet)	8
Liberal Party (Venstre)	4
Total number of members:	35

Averøy kommunestyre 1995–1999
Party name (in Norwegian)	Number of representatives
Labour Party (Arbeiderpartiet)	9
Progress Party (Fremskrittspartiet)	2
Conservative Party (Høyre)	2
Christian Democratic Party (Kristelig Folkeparti)	3
Centre Party (Senterpartiet)	6
Socialist Left Party (Sosialistisk Venstreparti)	1
Liberal Party (Venstre)	12
Total number of members:	35

Averøy kommunestyre 1991–1995
Party name (in Norwegian)	Number of representatives
Labour Party (Arbeiderpartiet)	10
Progress Party (Fremskrittspartiet)	1
Conservative Party (Høyre)	3
Christian Democratic Party (Kristelig Folkeparti)	4
Centre Party (Senterpartiet)	7
Socialist Left Party (Sosialistisk Venstreparti)	2
Liberal Party (Venstre)	8
Total number of members:	35

Averøy kommunestyre 1987–1991
Party name (in Norwegian)	Number of representatives
Labour Party (Arbeiderpartiet)	12
Progress Party (Fremskrittspartiet)	2
Conservative Party (Høyre)	3
Christian Democratic Party (Kristelig Folkeparti)	5
Centre Party (Senterpartiet)	4
Liberal Party (Venstre)	9
Total number of members:	35

Averøy kommunestyre 1983–1987
Party name (in Norwegian)	Number of representatives
Labour Party (Arbeiderpartiet)	13
Conservative Party (Høyre)	5
Christian Democratic Party (Kristelig Folkeparti)	5
Centre Party (Senterpartiet)	6
Liberal Party (Venstre)	6
Total number of members:	35

Averøy kommunestyre 1979–1983
Party name (in Norwegian)	Number of representatives
Labour Party (Arbeiderpartiet)	12
Conservative Party (Høyre)	5
Christian Democratic Party (Kristelig Folkeparti)	5
Centre Party (Senterpartiet)	6
Liberal Party (Venstre)	5
Non-party list (Upolitisk liste)	2
Total number of members:	35

Averøy kommunestyre 1975–1979
Party name (in Norwegian)	Number of representatives
Labour Party (Arbeiderpartiet)	13
Conservative Party (Høyre)	1
Christian Democratic Party (Kristelig Folkeparti)	5
New People's Party (Nye Folkepartiet)	1
Centre Party (Senterpartiet)	11
Liberal Party (Venstre)	4
Total number of members:	35

Averøy kommunestyre 1971–1975
Party name (in Norwegian)	Number of representatives
Labour Party (Arbeiderpartiet)	12
Conservative Party (Høyre)	1
Christian Democratic Party (Kristelig Folkeparti)	6
Centre Party (Senterpartiet)	8
Liberal Party (Venstre)	6
Local List(s) (Lokale lister)	2
Total number of members:	35

Averøy kommunestyre 1967–1971
Party name (in Norwegian)	Number of representatives
Labour Party (Arbeiderpartiet)	14
Conservative Party (Høyre)	1
Christian Democratic Party (Kristelig Folkeparti)	6
Centre Party (Senterpartiet)	7
Liberal Party (Venstre)	6
Local List(s) (Lokale lister)	1
Total number of members:	35

Averøy kommunestyre 1963–1967
Party name (in Norwegian)	Number of representatives
Labour Party (Arbeiderpartiet)	14
Conservative Party (Høyre)	2
Christian Democratic Party (Kristelig Folkeparti)	7
Centre Party (Senterpartiet)	7
Liberal Party (Venstre)	5
Total number of members:	35

=== Mayors ===
The mayor (Norwegian: ordfører) of Averøy Municipality is the political leader of the municipality and the chairperson of the municipal council. Here is a list of people who have held this position:

- 1964–1967: Magnar Kjønnøy (KrF)
- 1968–1970: Bjarne Strand (V)
- 1970–1971: Arne Avset (Sp)
- 1972–1973: Jon T. Søbstad (DNF)
- 1974–1978: Ole Kaarvaag (Sp)
- 1978–1979: Torger Hafskjær (KrF)
- 1980–1983: Jarle Haga (V)
- 1984–1985: Eilif Aae (Sp)
- 1986–1997: Leif Helge Kongshaug (V)
- 1997–2003: John Harry Kvalshaug (Sp)
- 2003–2007: Kjell Magne Sandø (Ap)
- 2007–2011: Jarle Haga (V)
- 2011–2015: Ann-Kristin Sørvik (Sp)
- 2015–2025: Ingrid Ovidie Rangønes (Ap)
- 2025–present: Raymond Smenes Kristensen (KrF)

== Transportation ==
Atlantic Ocean Road

The tourist attraction Atlanterhavsveien (lit. 'Atlantic Ocean Road') connects the island and municipality of Averøy to the neighboring Hustadvika Municipality, which is on the mainland to the west. The Storseisundet Bridge crosses the municipal boundary. In 2005, it was awarded the "Building of the Century" prize by the Norwegian Construction Industry. On the other side of the island near the village of Sveggen, Averøy is connected to Kristiansund Municipality via the undersea tunnel. This tunnel, known as Atlanterhavstunnelen (lit. 'Atlantic Ocean Tunnel'), was completed in December 2009, replacing the ferry from Bremsnes on Averøya to the city of Kristiansund.

== Notable people ==
- Erling Kristvik (1882 in Kornstad – 1969), an educator
- Aud Inger Aure (born 1942 in Averøy), a Norwegian politician and Mayor of Kristiansund Municipality
- Gunnar Kjønnøy (born 1947 in Averøy), an economist and County Governor of Finnmark from 1998 to 2016
- Leif Helge Kongshaug (born 1949 in Averøy), a Norwegian politician who was Mayor of Averøy from 1986 to 1997
- Magne Hoseth (born 1980 in Averøy), a coach and former footballer with 423 club caps and 22 for Norway

== Gallery ==
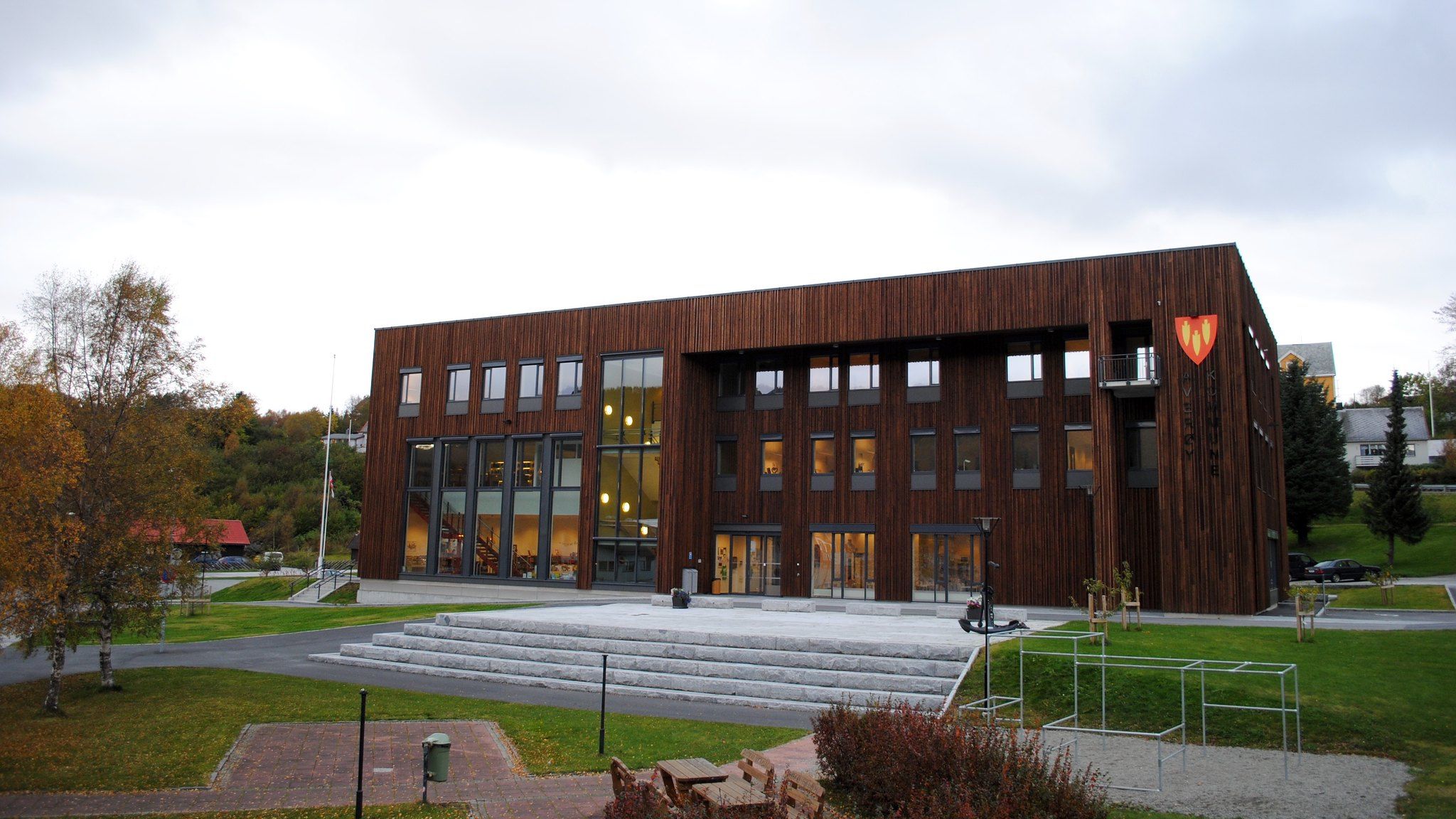
Averøy kommunehus

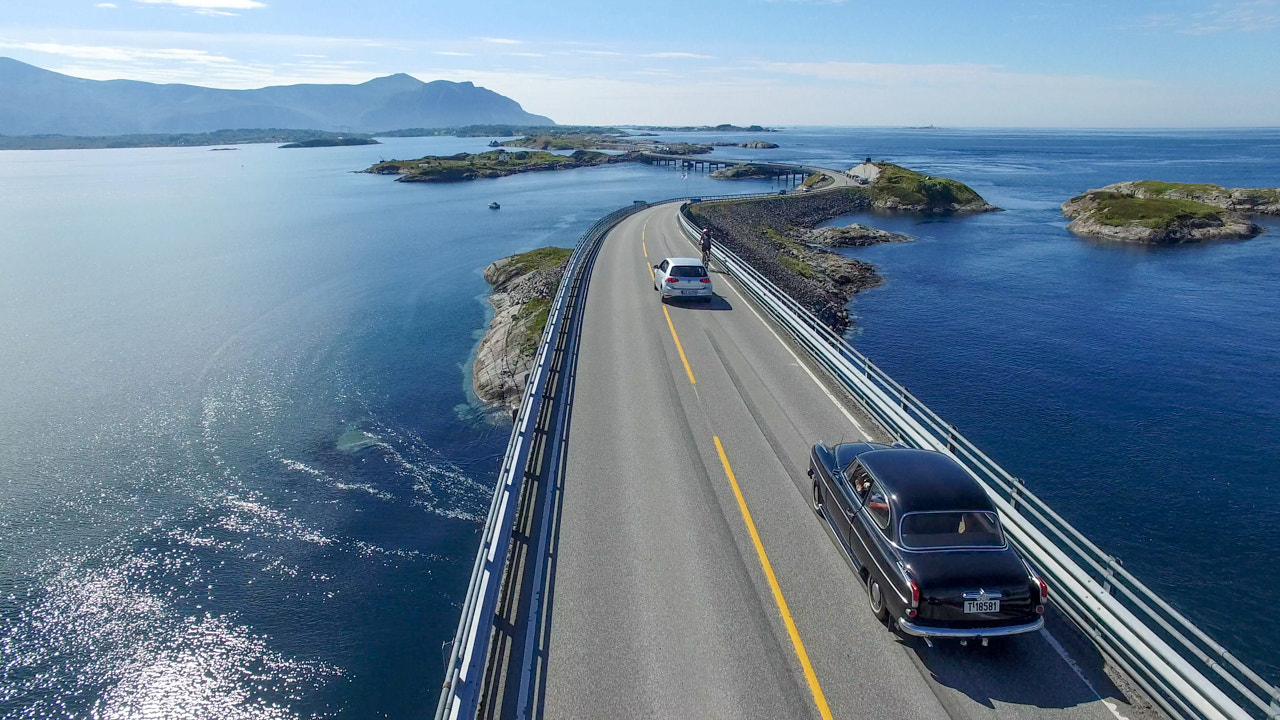
Atlantic Ocean Road

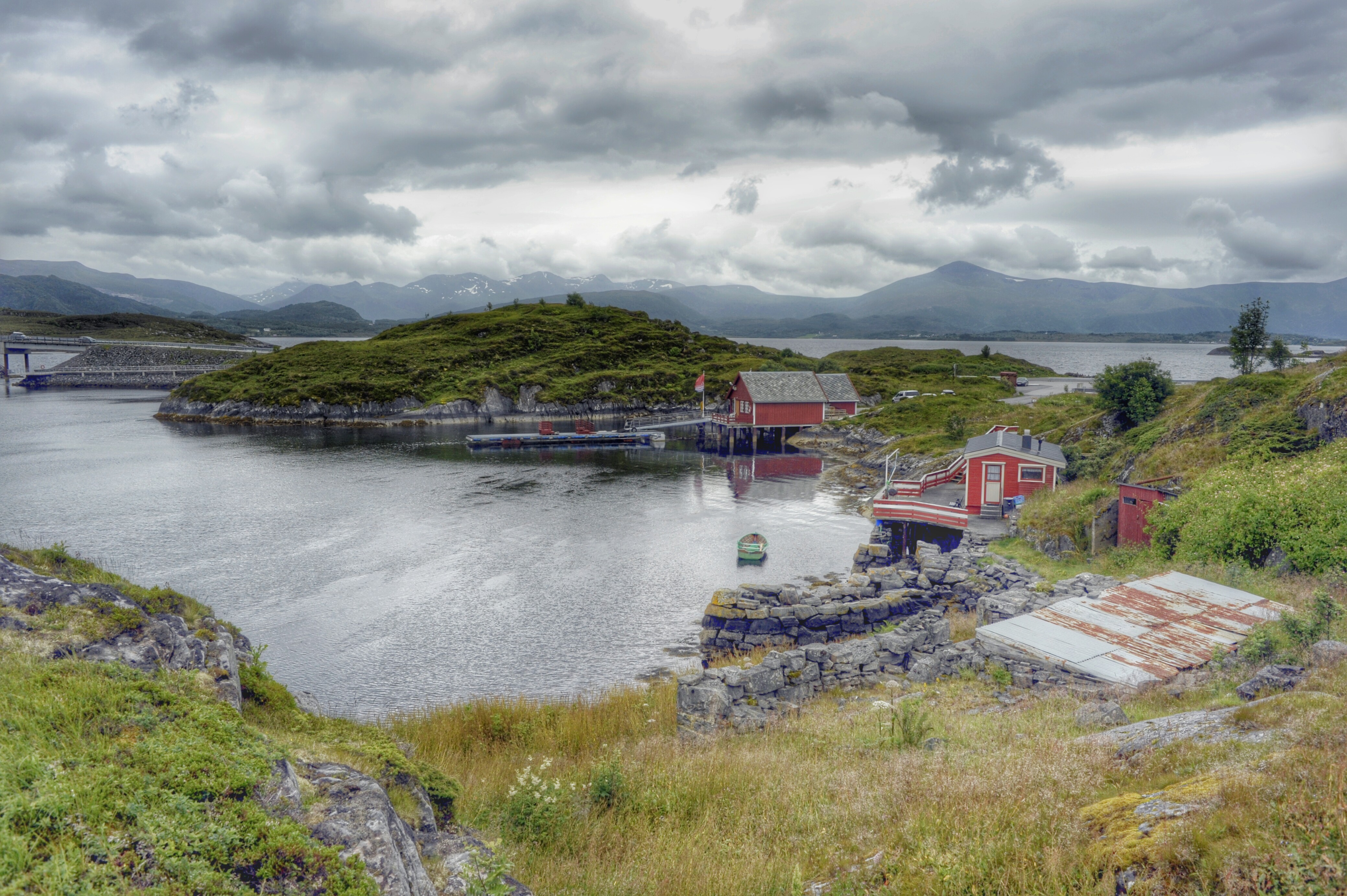
Averøy
