= Atlantic Ocean Tunnel =

Road passage in western Norway

Atlantic Ocean Tunnel Atlanterhavstunnelen
- Interactive map of Atlantic Ocean Tunnel; Atlanterhavstunnelen

Overview
- Location: Nordmøre, Norway
- Coordinates: 63°07′39″N 7°40′30″E
- Route: Rv64
- Start: Averøya island (63°6′30″N 7°38′5″E)
- End: Gomalandet, Kristiansund (63°7′32″N 7°43′26″E)

Operation
- Work began: 2006
- Opened: 19 December 2009
- Traffic: Automobile
- Toll: no

Technical
- Length: 5,727 metres (18,789 ft)
- Min elevation: −250 metres (−820 ft)
- Grade: 10% (maximum)

The Atlantic Ocean Tunnel (Norwegian: Atlanterhavstunnelen) is an undersea tunnel that is part of Norwegian County Road 64 which connects Kristiansund Municipality to Averøy Municipality in Møre og Romsdal county, Norway. The eastern end of the tunnel is on Kirkelandet island in the town of Kristiansund and the western end of the tunnel is on the island of Averøya, just west of the village of Sveggen. The 5,727-metre (18,789 ft) long tunnel runs beneath the Bremsnesfjorden, reaching a depth of 250 metres (820 ft), making it one of the deepest undersea tunnels in the world.

Construction began in 2006, and the tunnel opened on 19 December 2009, later than initially estimated. Breakthrough was in March 2009. Problems with water leaks caused delays and cost overruns.

The name of the tunnel comes from its connection of two islands located at the open Atlantic Ocean, and serves as an extension of the Atlantic Ocean Road (Norwegian: Atlanterhavsveien), a popular tourist attraction. The road runs over a series of small islands with views of sea, fjord, and mountains, connecting Averøya to the mainland near the town of Molde.

As of 1 July 2020, the tunnel is no longer a toll tunnel and driving through the tunnel is free for all types of vehicle.
