= Bremsnes, Møre og Romsdal =

Village in Averøy Municipality, Norway

Bremsnes
- Village
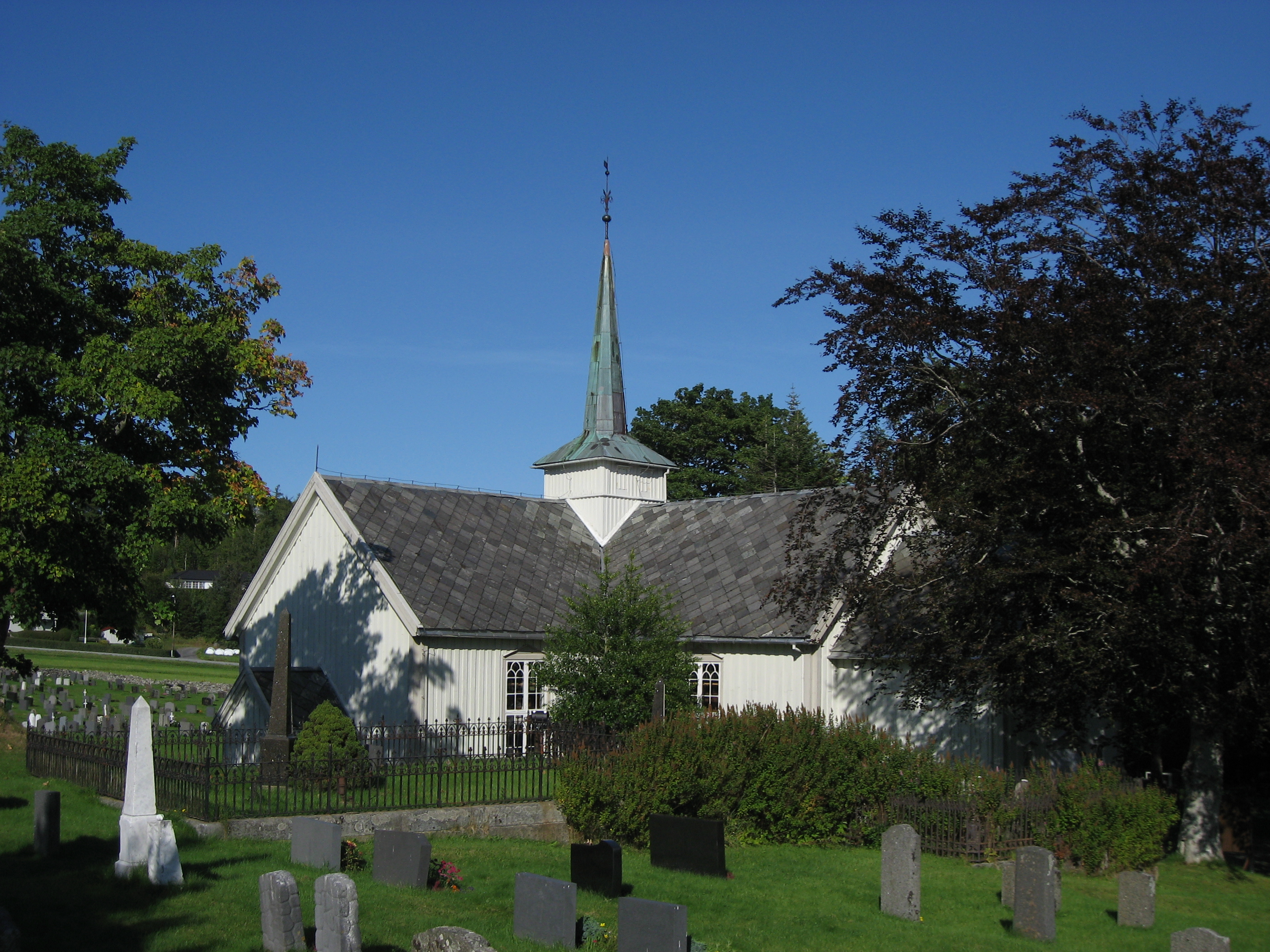
- View of the village church
- Interactive map of Bremsnes
- Location within Møre og Romsdal Location within Norway
- Coordinates: 63.0847°N 7.6621°E
- Country: Norway
- Region: Western Norway
- County: Møre og Romsdal
- District: Nordmøre
- Municipality: Averøy Municipality

Area
  - Total: 1.47 km^{2} (0.57 sq mi)
- Elevation: 29 m (95 ft)

Population (2024)
  - Total: 1,056
  - Density: 718/km^{2} (1,860/sq mi)
- Time zone: UTC+01:00 (CET)
  - Summer (DST): UTC+02:00 (CEST)
- Post Code: 6530 Averøy

Bremsnes is a village in Averøy Municipality in Møre og Romsdal county, Norway. The village is located on the northeastern part of the island of Averøya, about midway between the villages of Sveggen (to the north) and Bruhagen (to the south).

The 1.47-square-kilometre (360-acre) village has a population (2024) of 1,056 and a population density of 718 inhabitants per square kilometre (1,860/sq mi).

The village sits along the Norwegian County Road 64 which goes through the Atlantic Ocean Tunnel just north of Bremsnes. That undersea tunnel connects Averøya to the city of Kristiansund to the east.

== History ==
The village was the administrative centre of the old Bremsnes Municipality which existed from 1897 until 1964.

The historic Bremsnes Church is located in this village.
