= Bremsnes Church =

Church in Møre og Romsdal, Norway

- Bremsnes kyrkje
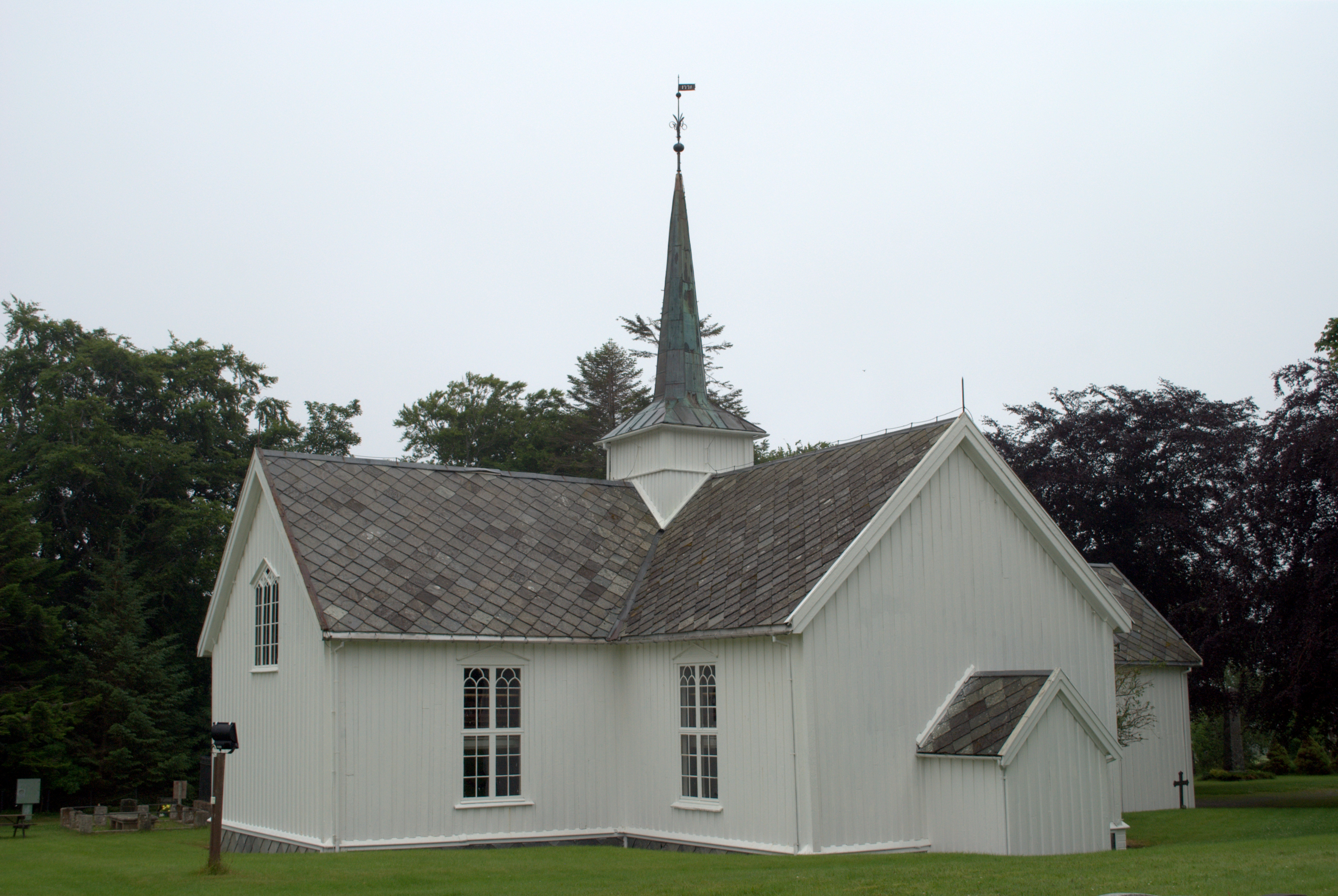
- View of the church
- Bremsnes Church
- 63°05′18″N 7°39′35″E
- Location: Averøy Municipality, Møre og Romsdal
- Country: Norway
- Denomination: Church of Norway
- Churchmanship: Evangelical Lutheran

History
- Status: Parish church
- Founded: 14th century
- Consecrated: 16 October 1771

Architecture
- Functional status: Active
- Architectural type: Cruciform
- Completed: 1771 (255 years ago)

Specifications
- Capacity: 350
- Materials: Wood

Administration
- Diocese: Møre bispedømme
- Deanery: Ytre Nordmøre prosti
- Parish: Bremsnes
- Norwegian Cultural Heritage Site
- Type: Church
- Status: Automatically protected
- ID: 83953

Bremsnes Church (Norwegian: Bremsnes kyrkje) is a parish church of the Church of Norway in Averøy Municipality in Møre og Romsdal county, Norway. It is located in the village of Bremsnes on the eastern coast of the island of Averøya, just west of the town of Kristiansund. It is the church for the Bremsnes parish which is part of the Ytre Nordmøre prosti (deanery) in the Diocese of Møre. The white, wooden church was built in a cruciform style in 1771 by an unknown architect. The church seats about 350 people.

== History ==
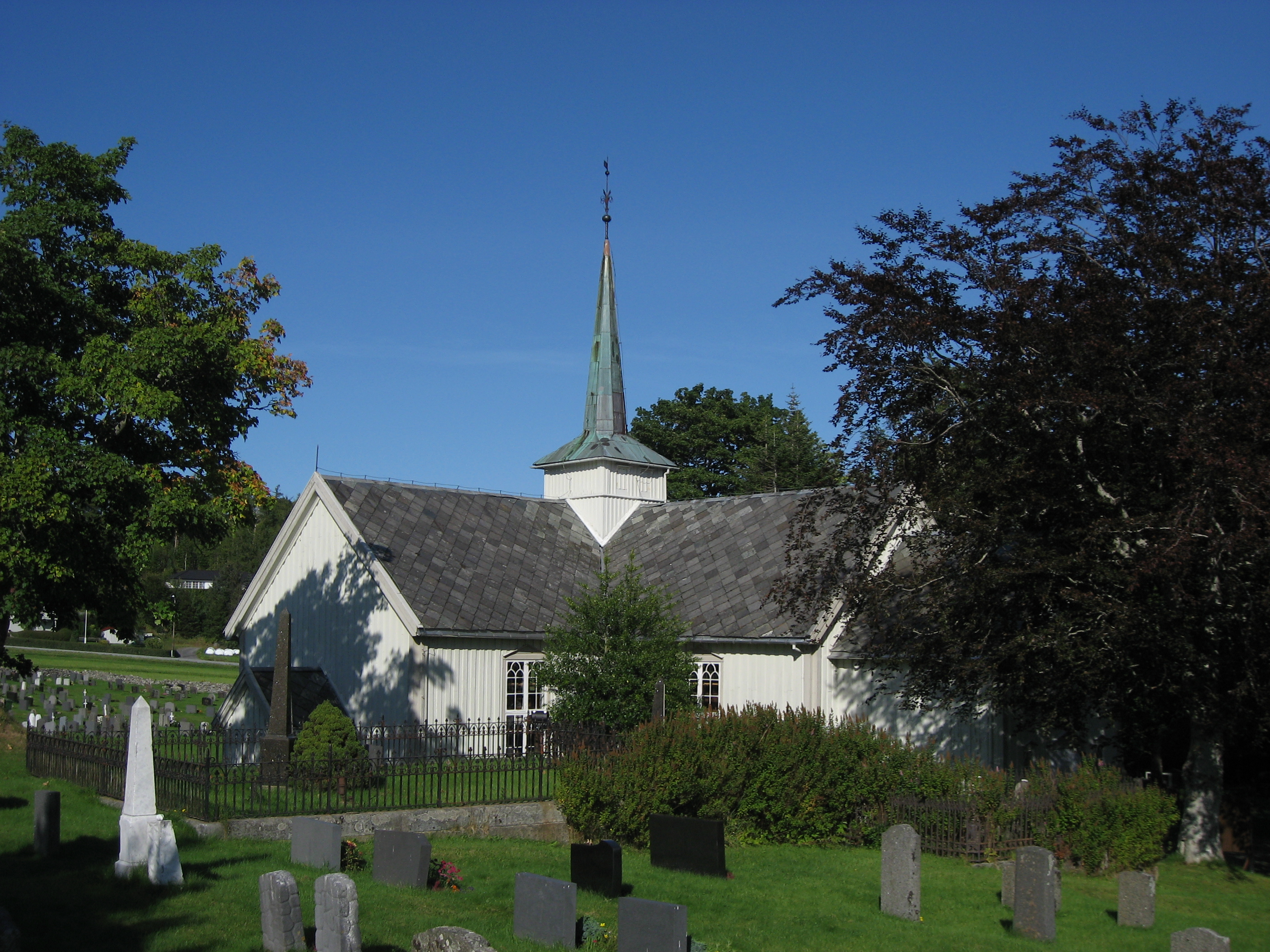
View of the church

Bremsnes has been a church site for centuries. The earliest existing historical records of the church date back to 1533, but it was likely built in the 14th century. The church was a stave church that was said to be dilapidated by the 1600s so there were some renovations done on the old building. In the 1640s, the church was enlarged and more decorations were added to make the building look nicer. In 1650, a new tower was built on the roof of the building. In 1664, the church underwent some more renovations and repairs. In the late-1600s, the nearby ladested of Lille-Fosna was growing, making Bremsnes Church quite important as it was the parish church for the young town. The nearby Grip archipelago was also using Bremsnes Church as their gravesite since they could not bury the dead on the rocky islands where Grip Stave Church was located.

In 1770, Bremsnes Church burned down, likely from a lightning strike. Since the church was used by people from the nearby town of Christianssund and the people from Grip, the church was quickly rebuilt in 1771 on the same site. The new church was a timber-framed, cruciform building with a sacristy on the east end. It was consecrated on 16 October 1771. A new altarpiece was built by Ole Jonsen Kolset in 1771 for the new church.

In 1814, this church served as an election church (Norwegian: valgkirke). Together with more than 300 other parish churches across Norway, it was a polling station for elections to the 1814 Norwegian Constituent Assembly which wrote the Constitution of Norway. This was Norway's first national elections. Each church parish was a constituency that elected people called "electors" who later met together in each county to elect the representatives for the assembly that was to meet at Eidsvoll Manor later that year.

== See also ==
- List of churches in Møre
