= Langøy Chapel =

- Langøy kapell
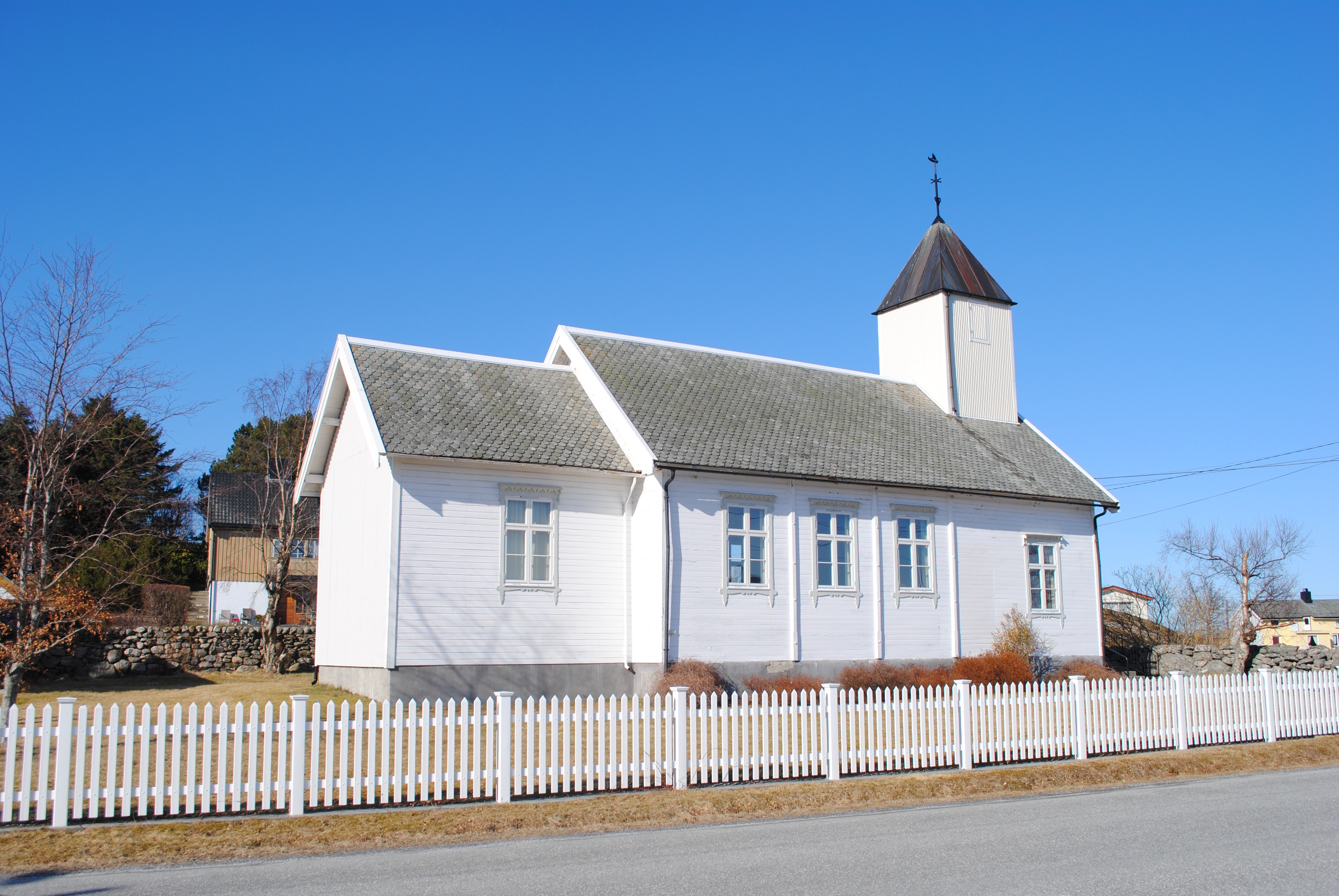
- View of the chapel
- Langøy Chapel
- 63°03′52″N 7°29′57″E
- Location: Averøy, Møre og Romsdal
- Country: Norway
- Denomination: Church of Norway
- Churchmanship: Evangelical Lutheran

History
- Status: Chapel
- Founded: 1935

Architecture
- Functional status: Active
- Architectural type: Long church
- Completed: 1935 (91 years ago)

Specifications
- Materials: Wood

Administration
- Diocese: Møre bispedømme
- Deanery: Ytre Nordmøre prosti
- Parish: Bremsnes
- Norwegian Cultural Heritage Site
- Type: Church
- Status: Not protected
- ID: 84907

Langøy Chapel (Norwegian: Langøy kapell) is a parish church of the Church of Norway in Averøy Municipality in Møre og Romsdal county, Norway. It is located in the village of Langøy. It is an annex chapel for the Averøy parish which is part of the Ytre Nordmøre prosti (deanery) in the Diocese of Møre. The white, wooden chapel was built in a long church design in 1935.

== See also ==
- List of churches in Møre
