= Bruhagen =

Village in Averøy Municipality, Norway

- Village
- Interactive map of Bruhagen
- Location within Møre og Romsdal Location within Norway
- Coordinates: 63.0526°N 7.6342°E
- Country: Norway
- Region: Western Norway
- County: Møre og Romsdal
- District: Nordmøre
- Municipality: Averøy Municipality
- Elevation: 8 m (26 ft)
- Time zone: UTC+01:00 (CET)
  - Summer (DST): UTC+02:00 (CEST)
- Post Code: 6530 Averøy

Bruhagen is the administrative center of Averøy Municipality in Møre og Romsdal county, Norway. The village is located on the east side of the island of Averøya, about midway between the villages of Bremsnes and Kvernes. Norwegian County Road 64 runs through the village.

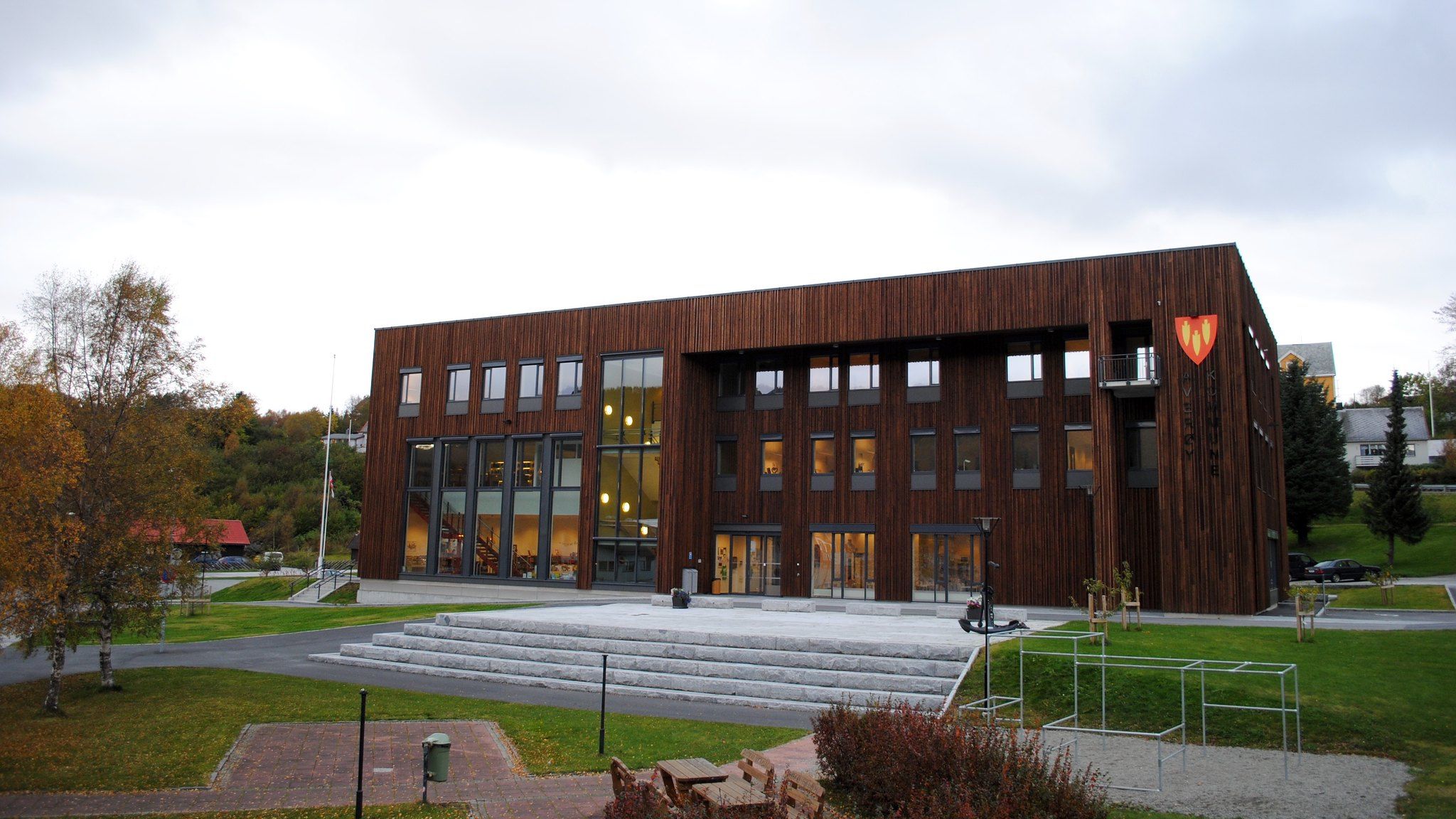
Averøy Municipality offices
