= Bremsnesfjorden =

Fjord in Møre og Romsdal, Norway

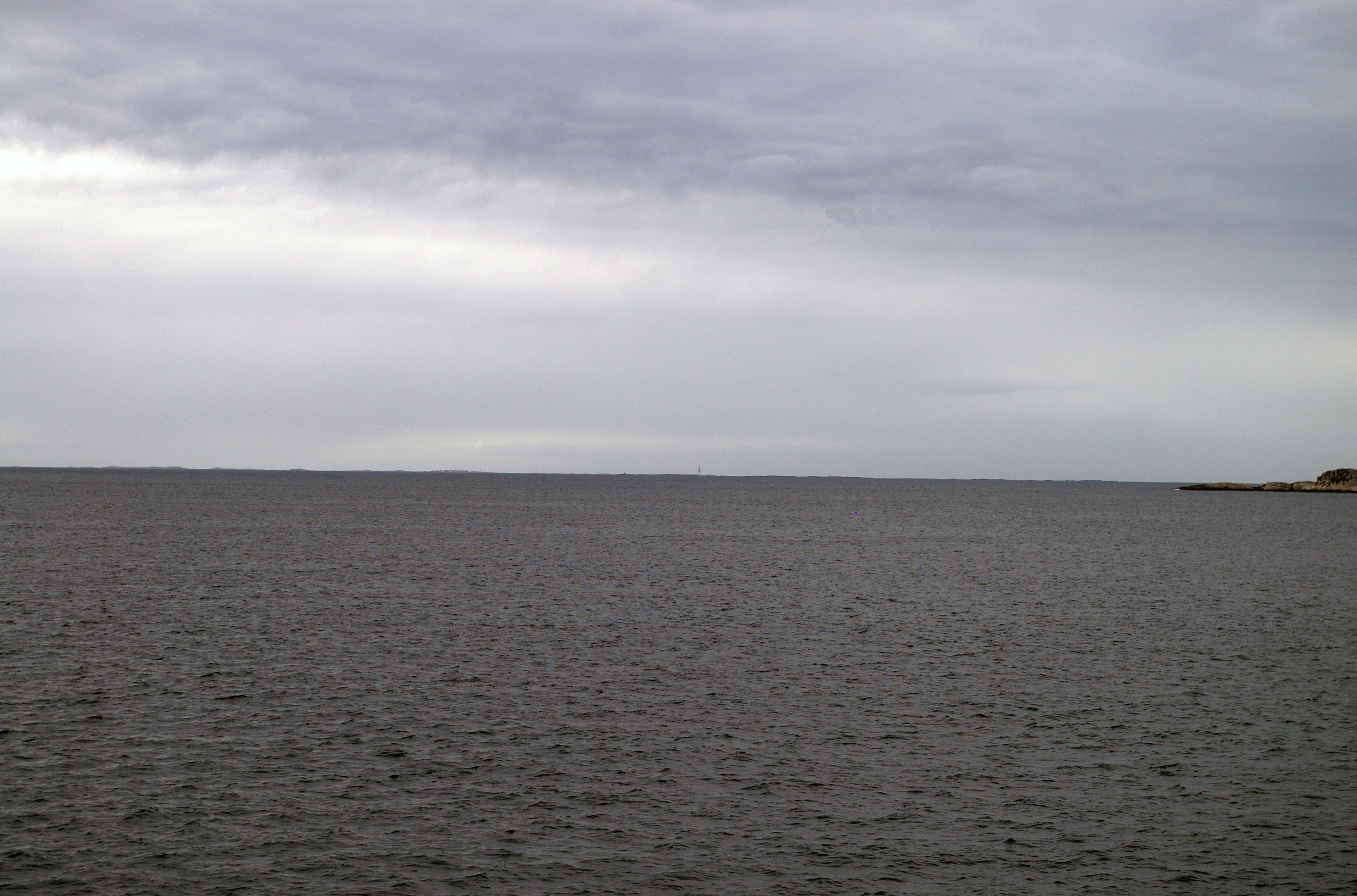
- View of the fjord
- Interactive map of the fjord
- Location: Møre og Romsdal county, Norway
- Coordinates: 63.08804°N 7.68991°E
- Type: Fjord
- Primary inflows: Kvernesfjorden
- Primary outflows: Norwegian Sea
- Basin countries: Norway
- Max. length: 11 kilometres (6.8 mi)

Bremsnesfjorden is a fjord in Møre og Romsdal county, Norway. The 11-kilometre (6.8 mi) long fjord flows between the island of Averøya in Averøy Municipality on the west and the islands of Kristiansund Municipality in the east.

The Atlantic Ocean Tunnel runs under the north end of the Bremsnesfjord, connecting Averøya to the town of Kristiansund.

== See also ==
- List of Norwegian fjords
