= Averøya =

Island in Møre og Romsdal, Norway

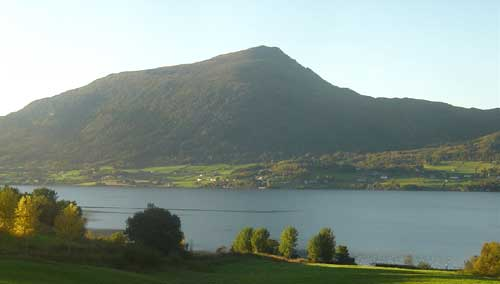
- View of the island
- Interactive map of Averøya

Geography
- Location: Møre og Romsdal, Norway
- Coordinates: 62.9873°N 7.4901°E
- Area: 161 km^{2} (62 sq mi)
- Length: 21 km (13 mi)
- Width: 19 km (11.8 mi)
- Highest elevation: 752 m (2467 ft)
- Highest point: Meekknoken

Administration
- Norway
- County: Møre og Romsdal
- Municipality: Averøy Municipality

Demographics
- Population: 5,872 (2023)
- Pop. density: 36.5/km^{2} (94.5/sq mi)

Averøya is an island in Averøy Municipality in Møre og Romsdal county, Norway. It is located north of the Romsdal peninsula surrounded by the Kornstadfjorden on the west and the Kvernesfjorden on the south and east, and the Bremsnesfjorden on the northeast. The main villages on the 161-square-kilometre (62 sq mi) island include Bruhagen, Kvernes, Kornstad, Kårvåg, Langøyneset, and Bremsnes. The island has a population (2023) of 5,872.

The island is connected to the mainland by the Atlanterhavsveien road, and it is connected to Kristiansund via the Atlantic Ocean Tunnel.

== History ==
Historically, the island was divided between Kvernes Municipality, Kornstad Municipality, and Bremsnes Municipality until 1964 when it became part of the newly-created Averøy Municipality.

== In popular culture ==
Norwegian comedy duo Ylvis made a music video about the island's need for an information sign. The video was recorded with a number of other Norwegian celebrities, (satirically) saying they are trying to raise money for a sign.
