= Eide Municipality (Møre og Romsdal) =

Former municipality in Møre og Romsdal, Norway

Eide Municipality Eide kommune
- Former municipality
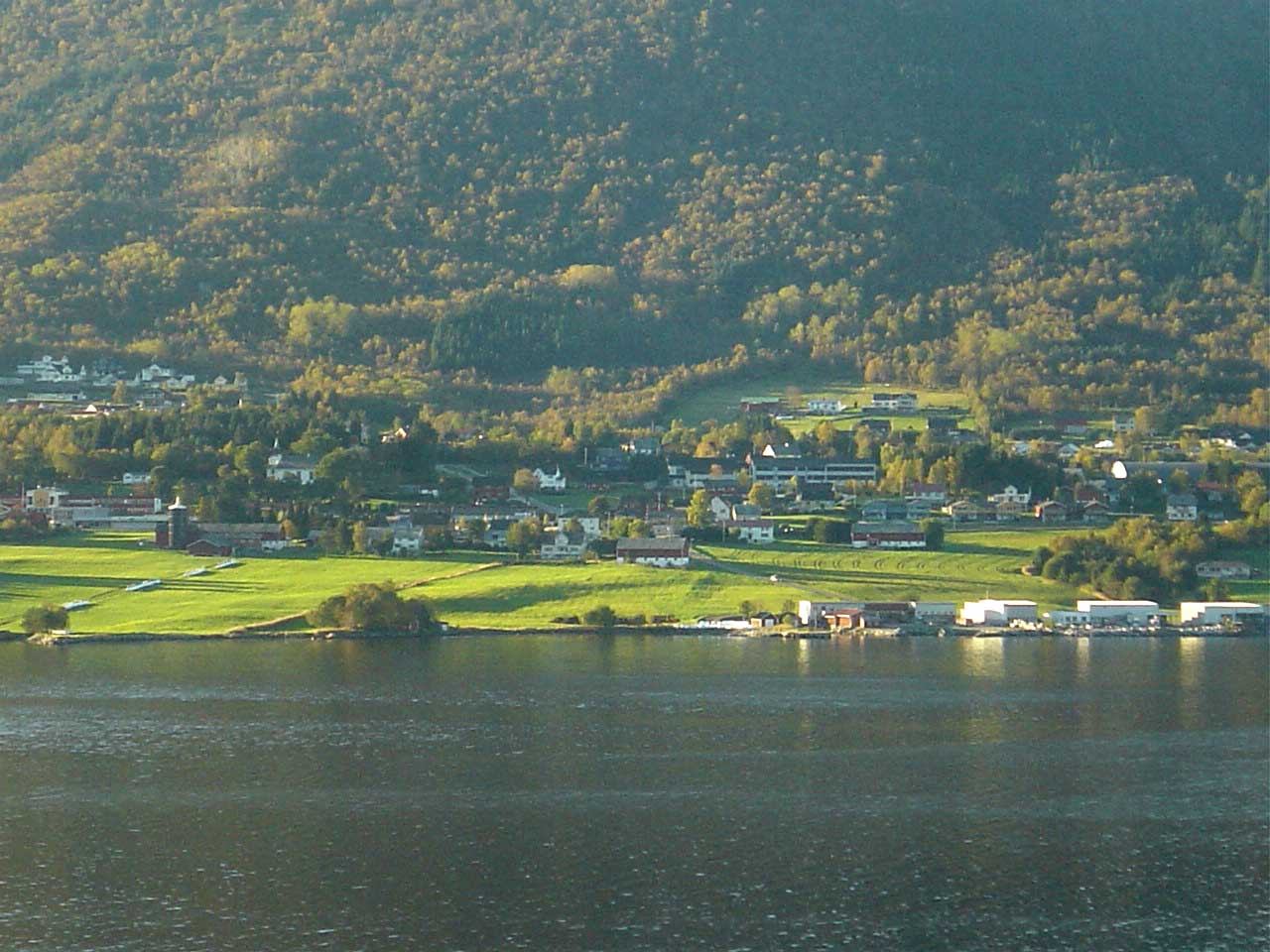
- View of the village of Eide

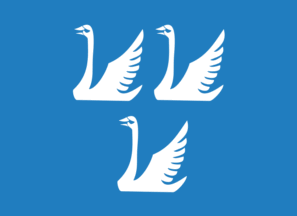
- Flag Coat of arms

- Møre og Romsdal within Norway

- Eide within Møre og Romsdal
- Coordinates: 62°55′41″N 07°22′25″E
- Country: Norway
- County: Møre og Romsdal
- District: Nordmøre
- Established: 1 Jan 1897
  - Preceded by: Kvernes Municipality
- Disestablished: 1 Jan 2020
  - Succeeded by: Hustadvika Municipality
- Administrative centre: Eide

Government
  - Mayor (2015-2019): Egil Karstein Strand (H)

Area (upon dissolution)
  - Total: 152.10 km^{2} (58.73 sq mi)
  - Land: 145.70 km^{2} (56.26 sq mi)
  - Water: 6.40 km^{2} (2.47 sq mi) 4.2%
  - Rank: #353 in Norway
- Highest elevation: 1,026.5 m (3,368 ft)

Population (2024)
  - Total: 3,433
  - Rank: #248 in Norway
  - Density: 22.6/km^{2} (59/sq mi)
  - Change (10 years): ▲ +3.5%
- Demonym: Eidesokning

Official language
  - Norwegian form: Bokmål
- Time zone: UTC+01:00 (CET)
  - Summer (DST): UTC+02:00 (CEST)
- ISO 3166 code: NO-1551

Eide is a former municipality in Møre og Romsdal county, Norway. The 152-square-kilometre (59 sq mi) municipality existed from 1897 until its dissolution in 2020. The area is now part of Hustadvika Municipality in the traditional district of Romsdal. It was located on the Romsdal peninsula, along the Kornstadfjorden and the Kvernesfjorden. The administrative centre of the municipality was the village of Eide. Other villages included Lyngstad, Vevang, and Visnes.

The municipality was known for its traditional and modern limestone (marble) quarries and related crafts industry. The Atlanterhavsveien coastal road connected Eide Municipality to neighboring Averøy Municipality to the east. The municipal border was located at the Storseisundet Bridge on the Atlanterhavsveien road.

Prior to its dissolution in 2020, the 152-square-kilometre (59 sq mi) municipality was the 353rd largest by area out of the 422 municipalities in Norway. Eide Municipality was the 248th most populous municipality in Norway with a population of about 3,433. The municipality's population density was 22.6 inhabitants per square kilometre (59/sq mi) and its population had increased by 3.5% over the previous 10-year period.

== General information ==
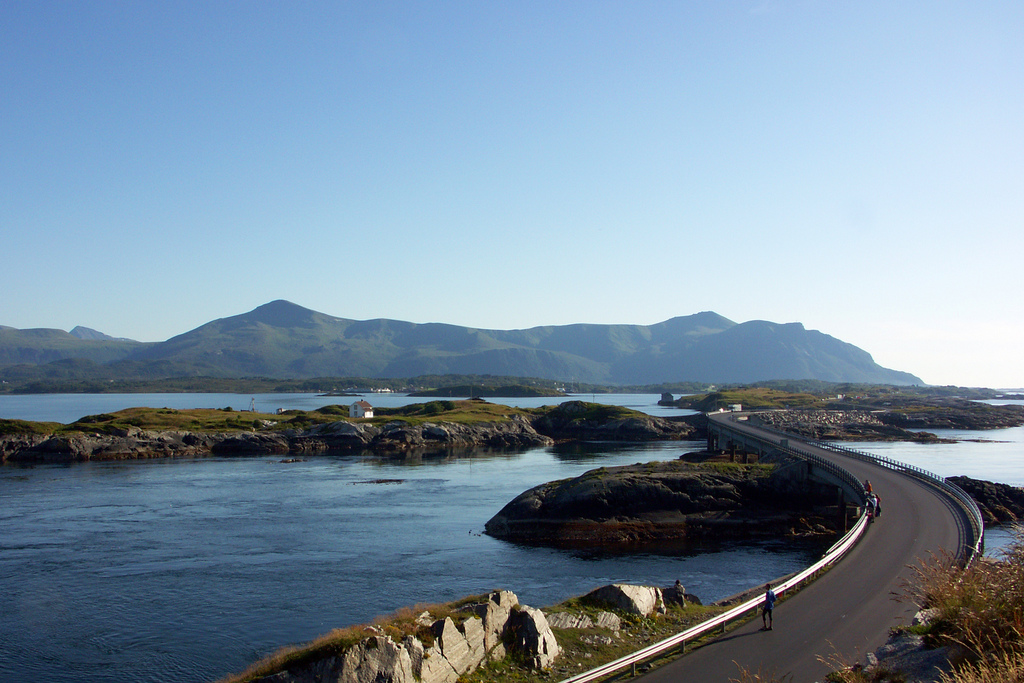
View of the Atlantic Ocean Road

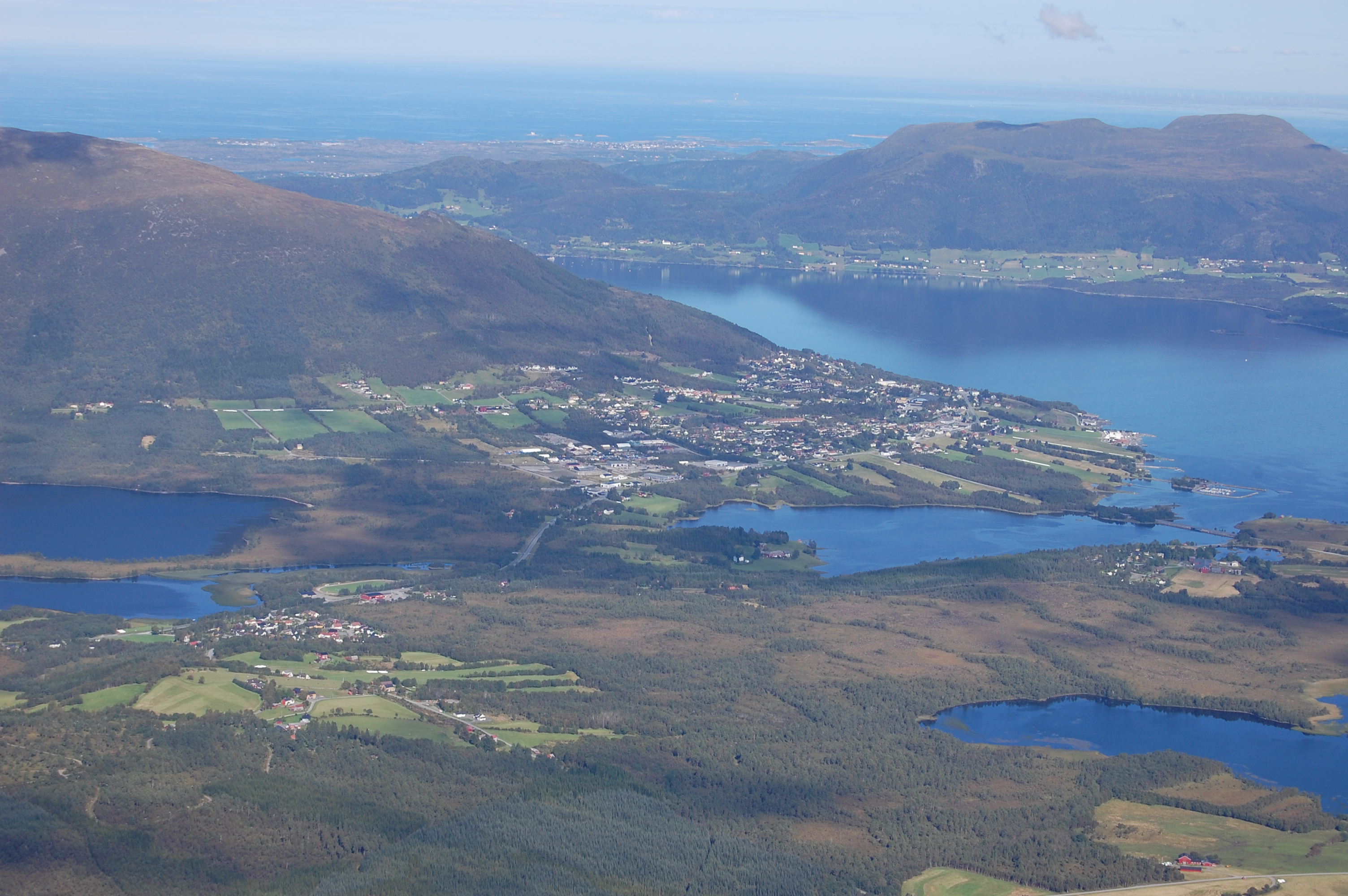
View of the village of Eide

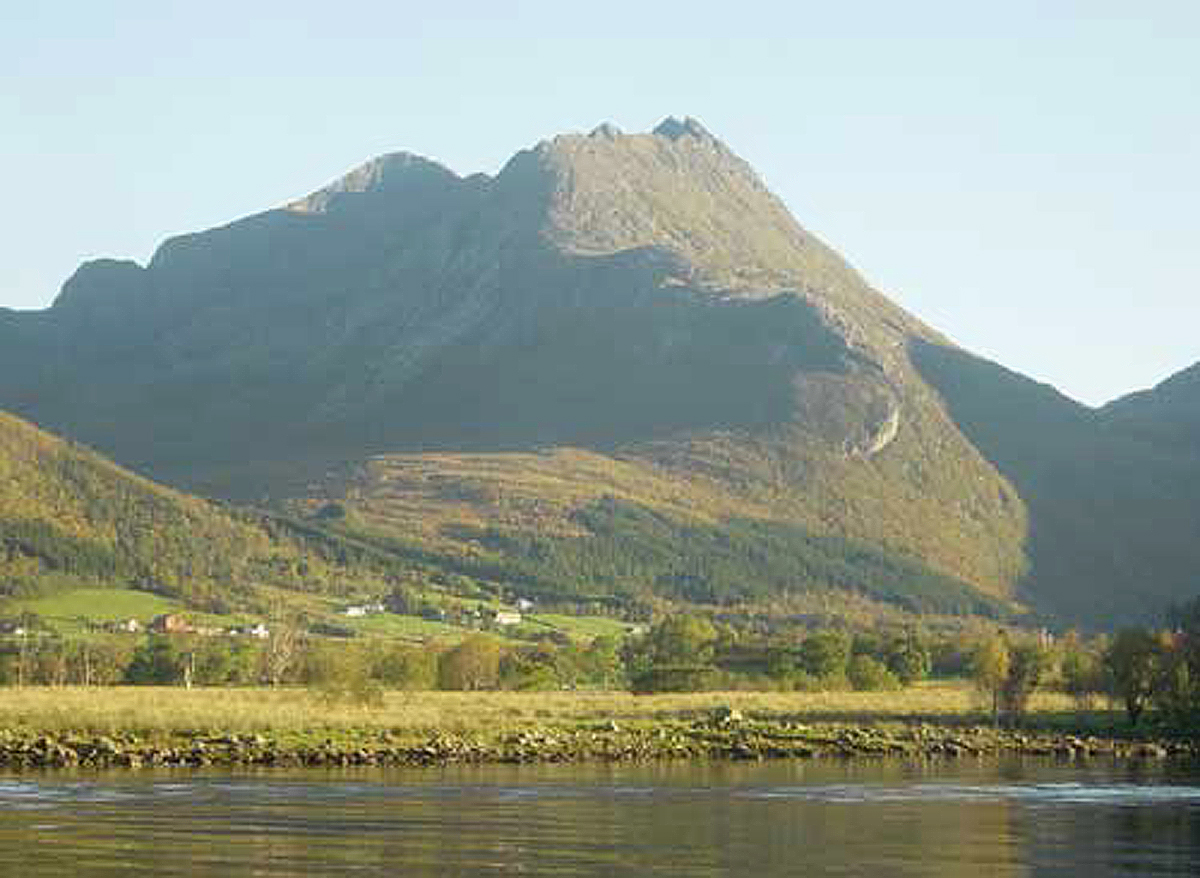
View of the mountain Stortussen

The municipality of Eide was established on 1 January 1897 when the large Kvernes Municipality was divided into four municipalities: Eide Municipality (population: 1,552) in the west, Kornstad Municipality (population: 1,599) in the center, Bremsnes Municipality (population: 2,917) in the northeast, and Kvernes Municipality (population: 857) in the southeast.

During the 1960s, there were many municipal mergers across Norway due to the work of the Schei Committee. On 1 January 1964, the Vevang area (population: 562) was transferred from Kornstad Municipality to Eide Municipality. On 1 January 1983, the uninhabited island of Eldhusøya (now part of the Atlanterhavsveien road) was transferred from Eide Municipality to Averøy Municipality.

On 1 January 2020, Eide Municipality and Fræna Municipality were merged to form the newly-created Hustadvika Municipality.

=== Name ===
The municipality (originally the parish) is named after the old Eide farm (Old Norse: Eið) since the first Eide Church was built there. The name comes from the dative case of the word eið which means "isthmus". This name is not referring to a true isthmus, but rather referring to a small valley area between two large hills and between the fjord and a large lake where the main village of Eide is located.

=== Coat of arms ===
The coat of arms was granted on 9 July 1982. The official blazon is "Azure, three swans argent naiant wings displayed, 2 over 1" (Norwegian: I blått tre svømmende sølv svaner, to over en). This means the arms have a blue field (background) and the charge is three whooper swans (Cygnus cygnus). The swans have a tincture of argent which means they are commonly colored white, but if the arms are made out of metal, then silver is used. The swans are facing dexter in a swimming position. The swans were chosen since they are very common in the many local lakes. Each swan has seven feathers, representing the seven main villages in the municipality. The arms were designed by Jarle Skuseth. The municipal flag has the same design as the coat of arms.

=== Churches ===
The Church of Norway had one parish (sokn) within Eide Municipality. It was part of the Ytre Nordmøre prosti (deanery) in the Diocese of Møre.

Churches in Eide Municipality
Parish (sokn)	Church name	Location of the church	Year built
Eide	Eide Church	Eide	1871
Eide	Gaustad Chapel	Gaustad, near Vevang	2001

== Geography ==
The municipality was located on the northern part of the Romsdal Peninsula, just west of the island of Averøya. Kvitholmen Lighthouse was located just off the northern coast of the municipality, in an area with hundreds of small islands and skerries. Fræna Municipality was located to the west, Gjemnes Municipality was to the southeast, and Averøy Municipality was to the east. The open Norwegian Sea was to the north. The highest point in the municipality was the 1,026.5-metre (3,368 ft) tall mountain Snøtinden.

== Government ==
While it existed, Eide Municipality was responsible for primary education (through 10th grade), outpatient health services, senior citizen services, welfare and other social services, zoning, economic development, and municipal roads and utilities. The municipality was governed by a municipal council of directly elected representatives. The mayor was indirectly elected by a vote of the municipal council. The municipality was under the jurisdiction of the Frostating Court of Appeal.

=== Municipal council ===
The municipal council (Kommunestyre) of Eide Municipality was made up of 21 representatives that were elected to four year terms. The tables below show the historical composition of the council by political party.

Eide kommunestyre 2015–2019
Party name (in Norwegian)	Number of representatives
Labour Party (Arbeiderpartiet)	7
Conservative Party (Høyre)	7
Christian Democratic Party (Kristelig Folkeparti)	1
Centre Party (Senterpartiet)	4
Liberal Party (Venstre)	2
Total number of members:	21

Eide kommunestyre 2011–2015
Party name (in Norwegian)	Number of representatives
Labour Party (Arbeiderpartiet)	7
Progress Party (Fremskrittspartiet)	2
Conservative Party (Høyre)	7
Christian Democratic Party (Kristelig Folkeparti)	1
Centre Party (Senterpartiet)	2
Liberal Party (Venstre)	2
Total number of members:	21

Eide kommunestyre 2007–2011
Party name (in Norwegian)	Number of representatives
Labour Party (Arbeiderpartiet)	6
Progress Party (Fremskrittspartiet)	2
Conservative Party (Høyre)	7
Christian Democratic Party (Kristelig Folkeparti)	1
Centre Party (Senterpartiet)	3
Liberal Party (Venstre)	2
Total number of members:	21

Eide kommunestyre 2003–2007
Party name (in Norwegian)	Number of representatives
Labour Party (Arbeiderpartiet)	6
Progress Party (Fremskrittspartiet)	3
Conservative Party (Høyre)	5
Christian Democratic Party (Kristelig Folkeparti)	2
Centre Party (Senterpartiet)	3
Socialist Left Party (Sosialistisk Venstreparti)	1
Liberal Party (Venstre)	1
Total number of members:	21

Eide kommunestyre 1999–2003
Party name (in Norwegian)	Number of representatives
Labour Party (Arbeiderpartiet)	5
Conservative Party (Høyre)	10
Christian Democratic Party (Kristelig Folkeparti)	1
Centre Party (Senterpartiet)	4
Liberal Party (Venstre)	1
Total number of members:	21

Eide kommunestyre 1995–1999
Party name (in Norwegian)	Number of representatives
Labour Party (Arbeiderpartiet)	5
Progress Party (Fremskrittspartiet)	1
Conservative Party (Høyre)	3
Christian Democratic Party (Kristelig Folkeparti)	2
Centre Party (Senterpartiet)	9
Liberal Party (Venstre)	1
Total number of members:	21

Eide kommunestyre 1991–1995
Party name (in Norwegian)	Number of representatives
Labour Party (Arbeiderpartiet)	7
Progress Party (Fremskrittspartiet)	1
Conservative Party (Høyre)	3
Christian Democratic Party (Kristelig Folkeparti)	2
Pensioners' Party (Pensjonistpartiet)	2
Centre Party (Senterpartiet)	4
Socialist Left Party (Sosialistisk Venstreparti)	1
Liberal Party (Venstre)	1
Total number of members:	21

Eide kommunestyre 1987–1991
Party name (in Norwegian)	Number of representatives
Labour Party (Arbeiderpartiet)	8
Progress Party (Fremskrittspartiet)	2
Conservative Party (Høyre)	3
Christian Democratic Party (Kristelig Folkeparti)	2
Centre Party (Senterpartiet)	3
Socialist Left Party (Sosialistisk Venstreparti)	1
Liberal Party (Venstre)	2
Total number of members:	21

Eide kommunestyre 1983–1987
Party name (in Norwegian)	Number of representatives
Labour Party (Arbeiderpartiet)	8
Progress Party (Fremskrittspartiet)	1
Conservative Party (Høyre)	3
Christian Democratic Party (Kristelig Folkeparti)	3
Centre Party (Senterpartiet)	4
Socialist Left Party (Sosialistisk Venstreparti)	1
Liberal Party (Venstre)	1
Total number of members:	21

Eide kommunestyre 1979–1983
Party name (in Norwegian)	Number of representatives
Labour Party (Arbeiderpartiet)	7
Conservative Party (Høyre)	5
Christian Democratic Party (Kristelig Folkeparti)	2
Centre Party (Senterpartiet)	4
Socialist Left Party (Sosialistisk Venstreparti)	1
Liberal Party (Venstre)	1
Joint list of The New People's Party and independent voters (Fellesliste - Det Nye Folkepartiet og uavhengige velgere)	1
Total number of members:	21

Eide kommunestyre 1975–1979
Party name (in Norwegian)	Number of representatives
Labour Party (Arbeiderpartiet)	5
Christian Democratic Party (Kristelig Folkeparti)	3
Centre Party (Senterpartiet)	6
Socialist Left Party (Sosialistisk Venstreparti)	1
Liberal Party (Venstre)	2
Joint list of the Conservative Party (Høyre) and New People's Party (Nye Folkepartiet)	4
Total number of members:	21

Eide kommunestyre 1971–1975
Party name (in Norwegian)	Number of representatives
Labour Party (Arbeiderpartiet)	7
Conservative Party (Høyre)	1
Christian Democratic Party (Kristelig Folkeparti)	3
Centre Party (Senterpartiet)	5
Liberal Party (Venstre)	3
Local List(s) (Lokale lister)	2
Total number of members:	21

Eide kommunestyre 1967–1971
Party name (in Norwegian)	Number of representatives
Labour Party (Arbeiderpartiet)	7
Conservative Party (Høyre)	2
Christian Democratic Party (Kristelig Folkeparti)	3
Centre Party (Senterpartiet)	6
Liberal Party (Venstre)	3
Total number of members:	21

Eide kommunestyre 1963–1967
Party name (in Norwegian)	Number of representatives
Labour Party (Arbeiderpartiet)	7
Conservative Party (Høyre)	2
Christian Democratic Party (Kristelig Folkeparti)	4
Centre Party (Senterpartiet)	5
Liberal Party (Venstre)	3
Total number of members:	21

Eide herredsstyre 1959–1963
Party name (in Norwegian)	Number of representatives
Labour Party (Arbeiderpartiet)	5
Conservative Party (Høyre)	1
Christian Democratic Party (Kristelig Folkeparti)	2
Centre Party (Senterpartiet)	4
Liberal Party (Venstre)	3
Local List(s) (Lokale lister)	2
Total number of members:	17

Eide herredsstyre 1955–1959
Party name (in Norwegian)	Number of representatives
Labour Party (Arbeiderpartiet)	4
Conservative Party (Høyre)	1
Christian Democratic Party (Kristelig Folkeparti)	4
Farmers' Party (Bondepartiet)	5
Liberal Party (Venstre)	3
Total number of members:	17

Eide herredsstyre 1951–1955
Party name (in Norwegian)	Number of representatives
Labour Party (Arbeiderpartiet)	3
Christian Democratic Party (Kristelig Folkeparti)	3
Farmers' Party (Bondepartiet)	4
Liberal Party (Venstre)	3
Local List(s) (Lokale lister)	3
Total number of members:	16

Eide herredsstyre 1947–1951
Party name (in Norwegian)	Number of representatives
Labour Party (Arbeiderpartiet)	4
Christian Democratic Party (Kristelig Folkeparti)	3
Farmers' Party (Bondepartiet)	5
Liberal Party (Venstre)	4
Total number of members:	16

Eide herredsstyre 1945–1947
Party name (in Norwegian)	Number of representatives
Labour Party (Arbeiderpartiet)	4
Christian Democratic Party (Kristelig Folkeparti)	3
Farmers' Party (Bondepartiet)	4
Liberal Party (Venstre)	3
Local List(s) (Lokale lister)	2
Total number of members:	16

Eide herredsstyre 1937–1941*
Party name (in Norwegian)	Number of representatives
Labour Party (Arbeiderpartiet)	5
Farmers' Party (Bondepartiet)	6
Liberal Party (Venstre)	5
Total number of members:	16
Note: Due to the German occupation of Norway during World War II, no elections were held for new municipal councils until after the war ended in 1945.

=== Mayors ===
The mayor (Norwegian: ordfører) of Eide Municipality was the political leader of the municipality and the chairperson of the municipal council. The following people have held this position:

- 1897–1898: O.M. Sildnes
- 1899–1910: Ole P. Silseth
- 1911–1919: Aslak Øyen
- 1920–1925: Aslak J. Halås
- 1926–1937: Edvard Brandshaug
- 1938–1939: Birger Bergem
- 1940–1951: Iver Dyrhaug
- 1952–1953: Trygve E. Eide (V)
- 1953–1960: Harald Øyen (H)
- 1961–1975: Trygve Sildnes (Sp)
- 1975–1975: Ole Herskedal (KrF)
- 1976–1980: Johannes J. Vaag (Sp)
- 1980–1981: Knut K. Strand (KrF)
- 1982–1983: Paul Husøy (Ap)
- 1984–1985: Ola Krogstad (Sp)
- 1986–1995: Jon Skarvøy (Ap)
- 1995–2003: Oddbjørn Silseth (H)
- 2003–2011: Arnfinn Storvik (H)
- 2011–2015: Ove Silseth (H)
- 2015–2019: Egil Karstein Strand (H)

== See also ==
- List of former municipalities of Norway
