= Kvernes Municipality =

Former municipality in Norway

Kvernes Municipality Kvernes herred
- Former municipality
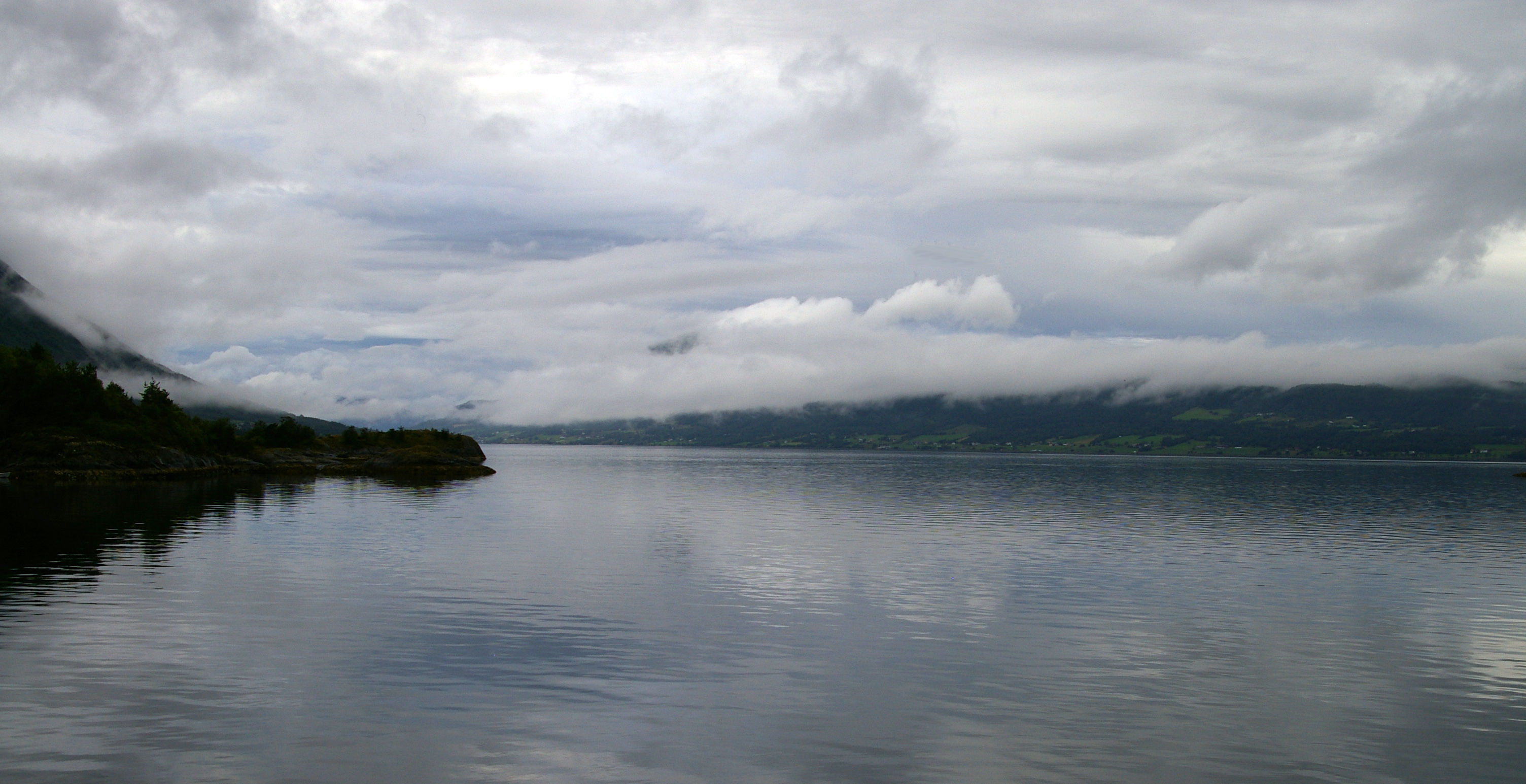
- View of Kvernes in the back-left part of the photo

- Møre og Romsdal within Norway

- Kvernes within Møre og Romsdal
- Coordinates: 63°00′22″N 07°43′31″E
- Country: Norway
- County: Møre og Romsdal
- District: Nordmøre
- Established: 1 Jan 1838
  - Created as: Formannskapsdistrikt
- Disestablished: 1 Jan 1964
  - Succeeded by: Averøy Municipality
- Administrative centre: Kvernes

Area (upon dissolution)
  - Total: 33.5 km^{2} (12.9 sq mi)
  - Rank: #608 in Norway
- Highest elevation: 751.03 m (2,464.0 ft)

Population (1963)
  - Total: 699
  - Rank: #657 in Norway
  - Density: 20.9/km^{2} (54/sq mi)
  - Change (10 years): ▼ −7.7%
- Demonym: Kvernesing

Official language
  - Norwegian form: Neutral
- Time zone: UTC+01:00 (CET)
  - Summer (DST): UTC+02:00 (CEST)
- ISO 3166 code: NO-1553

Kvernes is a former municipality in Møre og Romsdal county, Norway. The municipality existed from 1838 until its dissolution in 1964. Originally, it encompassed the whole island of Averøya, part of the Romsdal peninsula, part of the island of Nordlandet, and part of the island of Frei. Over time it gradually got smaller until 1964, when the 33.5-square-kilometre (12.9 sq mi) municipality was merged into Averøy Municipality. The administrative centre of the municipality was the village of Kvernes where Kvernes Stave Church (built in the 14th century) and the Kvernes Church (built in the 19th century) are both located.

Prior to its dissolution in 1964, the 33.5-square-kilometre (12.9 sq mi) municipality was the 608th largest by area out of the 689 municipalities in Norway. Kvernes Municipality was the 657th most populous municipality in Norway with a population of about 699. The municipality's population density was 20.9 inhabitants per square kilometre (54/sq mi) and its population had decreased by 7.7% over the previous 10-year period.

== General information ==
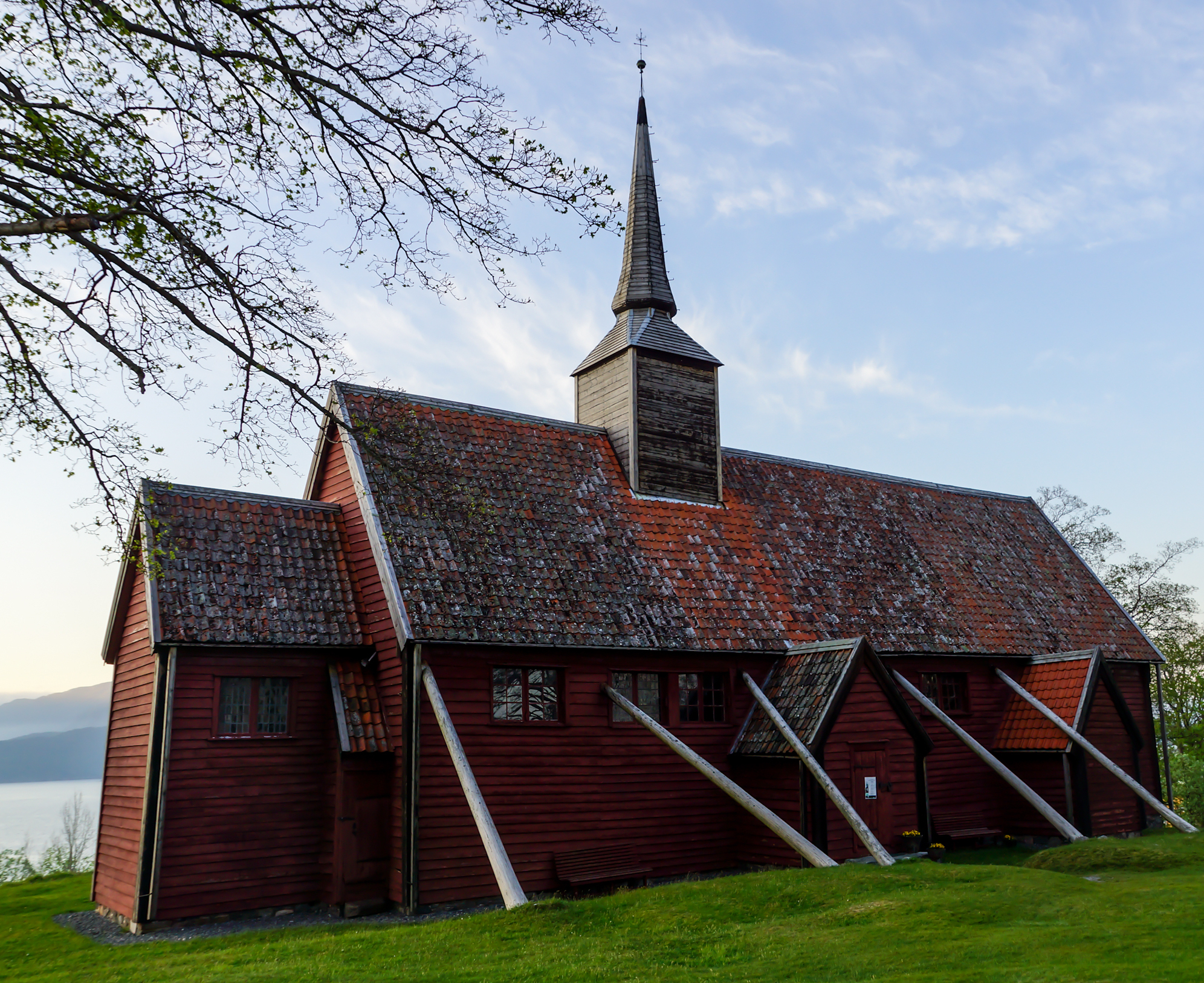
View of the Kvernes Stave Church

The municipality of Kværnes was established on 1 January 1838 (see formannskapsdistrikt law). According to the 1835 census, the municipality initially had a population of about 3,754. On 1 January 1878, a small area in the western part of Bud Municipality (population: 15) was transferred to Kvernes Municipality. Then again on 1 January 1891, the Bollien farm (population: 15) was transferred from Bud Municipality to Kvernes Municipality. On 1 September 1893, parts of Kvernes Municipality (population: 477) along with parts of Frei Municipality and Øre Municipality were used to create the new Gjemnes Municipality.

On 1 January 1897, the large Kvernes Municipality was divided into four new municipalities: Eide Municipality (population: 1,552) in the west, Kornstad Municipality (population: 1,599) in the central part, Bremsnes Municipality (population: 2,917) in the north, and (a much smaller) Kvernes Municipality (population: 857) in the southeast. On 8 July 1903, an uninhabited area of Bremsnes Municipality was transferred over to Kvernes Municipality.

During the 1960s, there were many municipal mergers across Norway due to the work of the Schei Committee. On 1 January 1964, Kvernes Municipality (population: 693) was merged with most of Kornstad Municipality (population: 1,356), and Bremsnes Municipality (population: 3,153) to create the new Averøy Municipality.

=== Name ===
The municipality (originally the parish) is named after the old Kvernes farm (Old Norse: Hverfnes) since the first Kvernes Church was built there. The first element is hverfa which means "turn", "swing", or "disappear out of sight". The last element is nes which means "headland". The name is likely referring to the fact that this place is located on a headland on the southeast part of the island of Averøya, where the fjord takes a roughly ninety-degree turn as it passes around the island.

=== Churches ===
The Church of Norway had one parish (sokn) within Kvernes Municipality. At the time of the municipal dissolution, it was part of the Kvernes prestegjeld and the Ytre Nordmøre prosti (deanery) in the Diocese of Nidaros.

Churches in Kvernes Municipality
Parish (sokn)	Church name	Location of the church	Year built
Kvernes	Kvernes Church	Kvernes	1893
Kvernes	Kvernes Stave Church	Kvernes	c. 1300s

== Geography ==
The municipality was located on the southeastern coast of the island of Averøya, along the Kvernesfjorden. Bremsnes Municipality was located to the north, Frei Municipality was to the east (across the fjord), Gjemnes Municipality was to the south (across the fjord), and Kornstad Municipality was to the west. The highest point in the municipality was the 751-metre (2,464 ft) tall mountain Mekknøken, on the border with Bremsnes Municipality.

== Government ==
While it existed, Kvernes Municipality was responsible for primary education (through 10th grade), outpatient health services, senior citizen services, welfare and other social services, zoning, economic development, and municipal roads and utilities. The municipality was governed by a municipal council of directly elected representatives. The mayor was indirectly elected by a vote of the municipal council. The municipality was under the jurisdiction of the Frostating Court of Appeal.

=== Municipal council ===
The municipal council (Herredsstyre) of Kvernes Municipality was made up of 13 representatives that were elected to four-year terms. The tables below show the historical composition of the council by political party.

Kvernes herredsstyre 1959–1963
Party name (in Norwegian)	Number of representatives
Labour Party (Arbeiderpartiet)	4
Christian Democratic Party (Kristelig Folkeparti)	2
Centre Party (Senterpartiet)	4
Liberal Party (Venstre)	3
Total number of members:	13

Kvernes herredsstyre 1955–1959
Party name (in Norwegian)	Number of representatives
Labour Party (Arbeiderpartiet)	3
Christian Democratic Party (Kristelig Folkeparti)	2
Farmers' Party (Bondepartiet)	5
Liberal Party (Venstre)	2
Local List(s) (Lokale lister)	1
Total number of members:	13

Kvernes herredsstyre 1951–1955
Party name (in Norwegian)	Number of representatives
Labour Party (Arbeiderpartiet)	4
Christian Democratic Party (Kristelig Folkeparti)	2
Farmers' Party (Bondepartiet)	3
Liberal Party (Venstre)	2
Local List(s) (Lokale lister)	1
Total number of members:	12

Kvernes herredsstyre 1947–1951
Party name (in Norwegian)	Number of representatives
Labour Party (Arbeiderpartiet)	4
Joint List(s) of Non-Socialist Parties (Borgerlige Felleslister)	8
Total number of members:	12

Kvernes herredsstyre 1945–1947
Party name (in Norwegian)	Number of representatives
Labour Party (Arbeiderpartiet)	5
Joint List(s) of Non-Socialist Parties (Borgerlige Felleslister)	7
Total number of members:	12

Kvernes herredsstyre 1937–1941*
Party name (in Norwegian)	Number of representatives
Labour Party (Arbeiderpartiet)	5
Local List(s) (Lokale lister)	7
Total number of members:	12
Note: Due to the German occupation of Norway during World War II, no elections were held for new municipal councils until after the war ended in 1945.

=== Mayors ===
The mayor (Norwegian: ordfører) of Kvernes Municipality was the political leader of the municipality and the chairperson of the municipal council. The following people have held this position:

- 1838–1843: Rev. Peder Christian Tyrholm Holtermann
- 1844–1847: Esten Strøm
- 1848–1851: Rev. Anders Daae
- 1852–1853: Isak Frantsvaag
- 1854–1855: Christian Møllerop
- 1856–1857: Knut Grønset
- 1858–1861: Esten Strøm
- 1862–1883: Ole Lie
- 1883–1896: Jakob Løvø
- 1897–1913: Jakob L. Mork
- 1914–1922: Jens Lie
- 1923–1945: Lars J. Mork
- 1946–1951: Magnar Rugset
- 1951–1959: Arne T. Avset (Bp)
- 1959–1964: Kristian H. Strand (Ap)

== See also ==
- List of former municipalities of Norway
