= Eide Church (Møre og Romsdal) =

Church in Møre og Romsdal, Norway

- Eide kyrkje
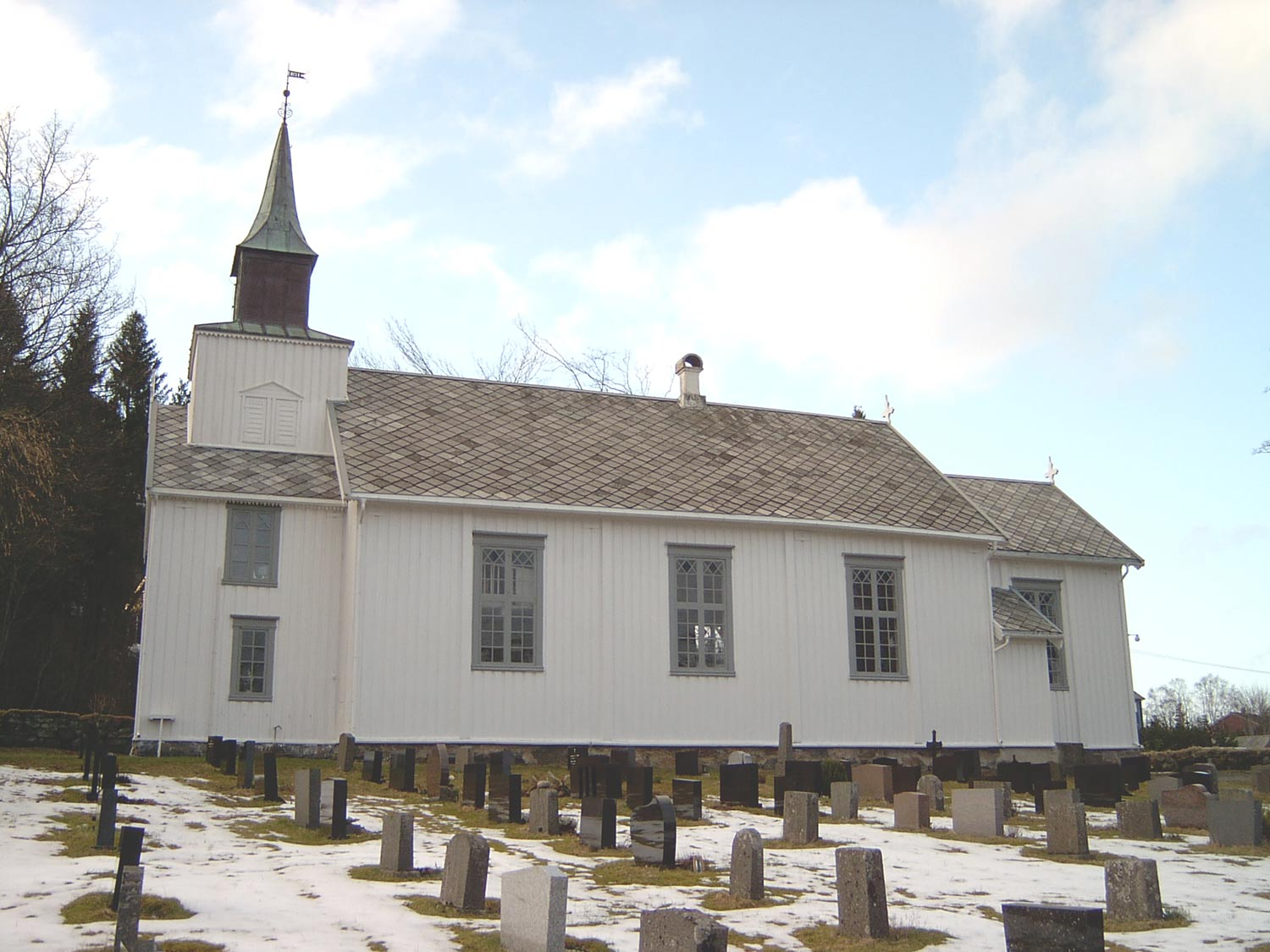
- View of the church
- Eide Church
- 62°55′00″N 7°26′40″E
- Location: Hustadvika Municipality, Møre og Romsdal
- Country: Norway
- Denomination: Church of Norway
- Churchmanship: Evangelical Lutheran

History
- Status: Parish church
- Founded: 1871
- Consecrated: 1871

Architecture
- Functional status: Active
- Architect: Jacob Wilhelm Nordan
- Architectural type: Long church
- Completed: 1871 (155 years ago)

Specifications
- Capacity: 250
- Materials: Wood

Administration
- Diocese: Møre bispedømme
- Deanery: Molde domprosti
- Parish: Eide
- Norwegian Cultural Heritage Site
- Type: Church
- Status: Not protected
- ID: 84066

Eide Church (Norwegian: Eide kyrkje) is a parish church of the Church of Norway in Hustadvika Municipality in Møre og Romsdal county, Norway. It is located in the village of Eide. It is the main church for the Eide parish which is part of the Molde domprosti (arch-deanery) in the Diocese of Møre. The white, wooden church was built in a long church design in 1871 using plans drawn up by the architect Jacob Wilhelm Nordan. The church seats about 250 people.

== History ==
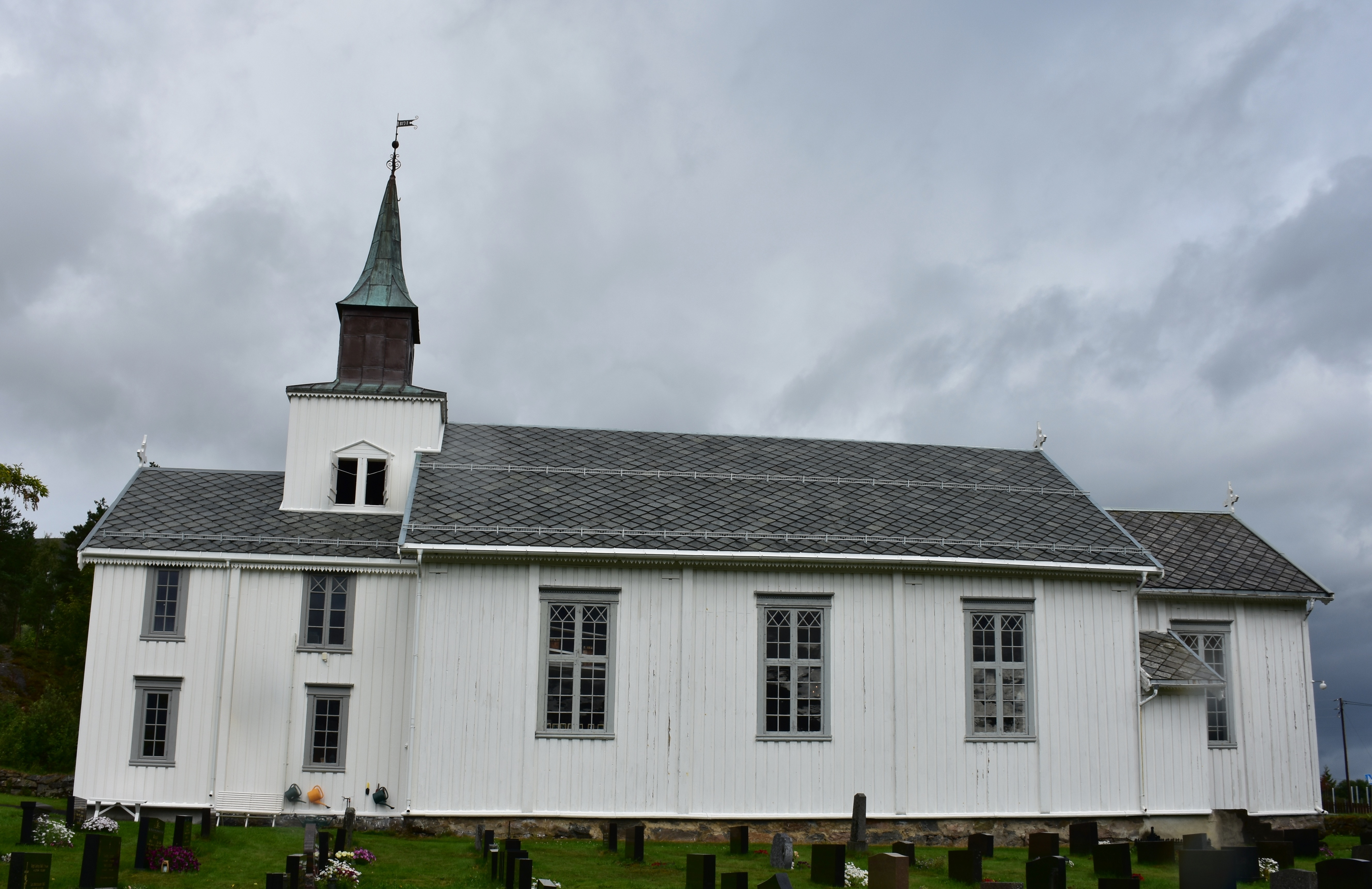
View of the church

The people of the Eide area had historically attended the Kvernes Stave Church and more recently the Kornstad Church, but by the mid-1800s, they were desiring their own local church that they could attend without boating across a fjord. In 1871, a new church was built in Eide. The church was designed by Jacob Wilhelm Nordan and the lead builder was Gustav O. Olsen. The church is strikingly similar to the nearby Kornstad Church which Nordan also designed. The new Eide Church was consecrated on either 22 August or 10 September 1871 (the sources are not clear). Regardless of the date, the Bishop Andreas Grimelund performed the consecration. Around the year 2014, the church porch was enlarged to the west.

== See also ==
- List of churches in Møre
