= Visnes =

Visnes may refer to:

== Places ==
- Visnes, Møre og Romsdal, a village in the municipality of Hustadvika in Møre og Romsdal county, Norway
- Visnes, Rogaland, a village in the municipality of Karmøy in Rogaland county, Norway
- Visnes, Vestland, a village in the municipality of Stryn in Vestland county, Norway

== People ==
- Tom Cato Visnes, a Norwegian bass guitarist also known under the name King ov Hell
