= Kornstad =

Village in Averøy Municipality, Norway

- Village
- Interactive map of Kornstad
- Location within Møre og Romsdal Location within Norway
- Coordinates: 62°57′53″N 07°27′10″E
- Country: Norway
- Region: Western Norway
- County: Møre og Romsdal
- District: Nordmøre
- Municipality: Averøy Municipality
- Elevation: 3 m (9.8 ft)
- Time zone: UTC+01:00 (CET)
  - Summer (DST): UTC+02:00 (CEST)
- Post Code: 6530 Averøy

Kornstad is a village in Averøy Municipality in Møre og Romsdal county, Norway. The village is located on the west side of the island of Averøya, along the Kornstadfjorden. The village of Visnes (in Hustadvika Municipality) lies directly across the fjord from Kornstad.

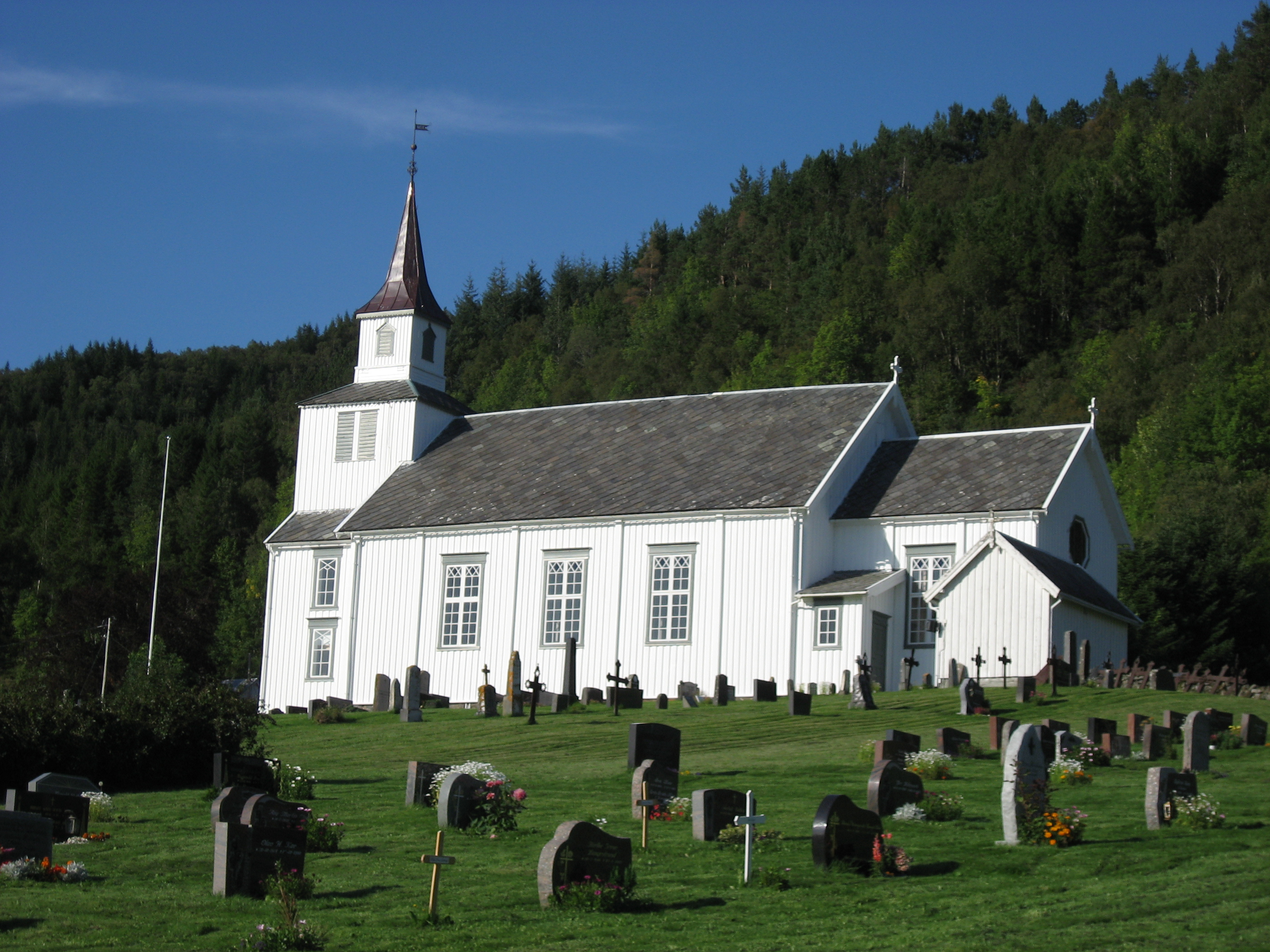
View of the Kornstad Church

== History ==
The village of Kornstad was the administrative centre of the old Kornstad Municipality which existed from 1897 until 1964 when the municipality was dissolved.

The historic Kornstad Church is located in this village.
