= Eide Municipality =

Eide Municipality may refer to:

- Eide Municipality (Aust-Agder), a former municipality now part of Grimstad Municipality in Agder county
- Eide Municipality (Møre og Romsdal), a former municipality now part of Hustadvika Municipality in Møre og Romsdal county

== See also ==
- Eide#Places
