= Eide, Møre og Romsdal =

Village in Hustadvika Municipality, Norway

Eide
- Village
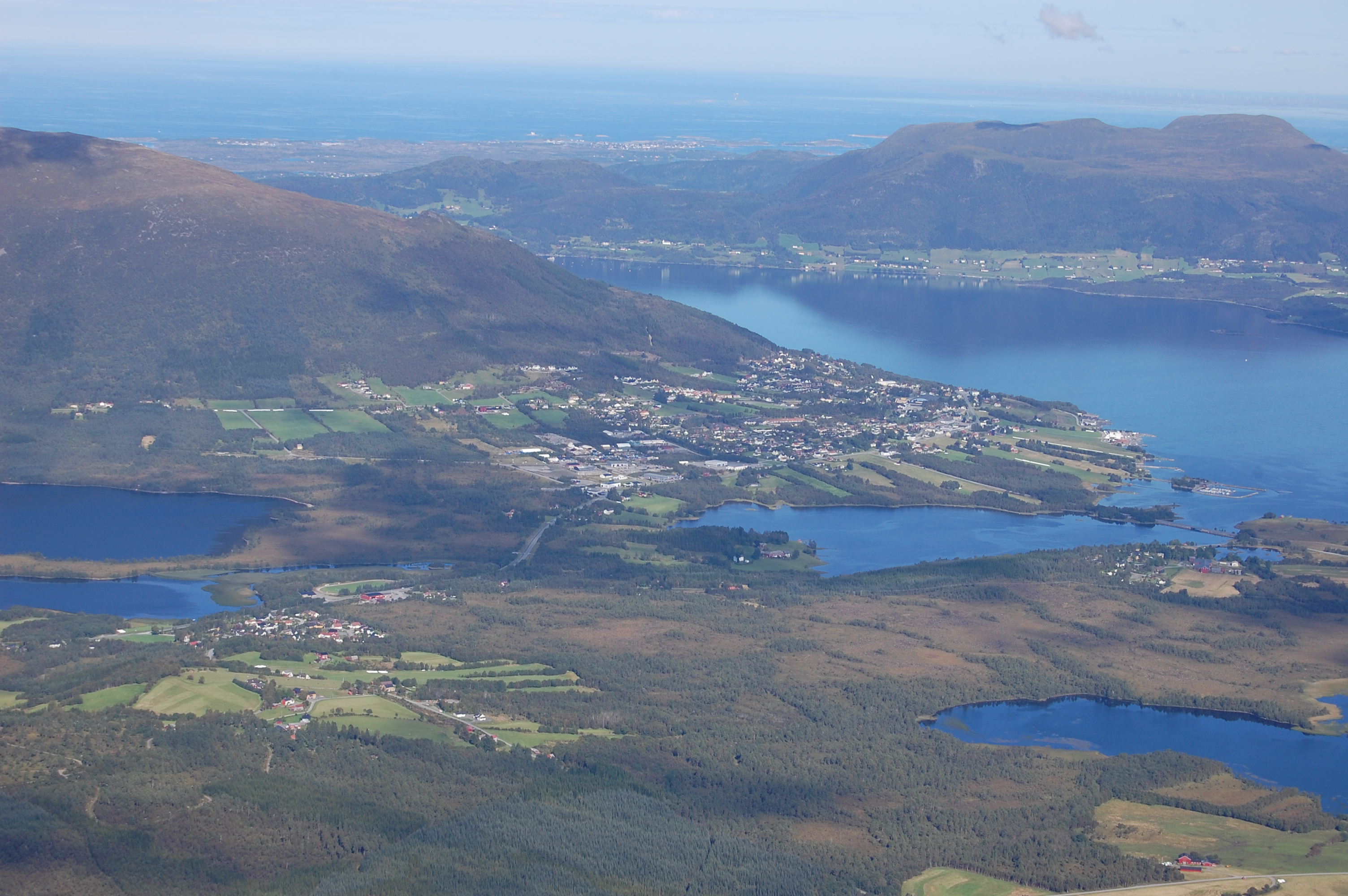
- View of the village
- Interactive map of Eide
- Location within Møre og Romsdal Location within Norway
- Coordinates: 62.9173°N 7.4467°E
- Country: Norway
- Region: Western Norway
- County: Møre og Romsdal
- District: Nordmøre
- Municipality: Hustadvika Municipality

Area
  - Total: 1.88 km^{2} (0.73 sq mi)
- Elevation: 38 m (125 ft)

Population (2024)
  - Total: 1,496
  - Density: 796/km^{2} (2,060/sq mi)
- Time zone: UTC+01:00 (CET)
  - Summer (DST): UTC+02:00 (CEST)
- Post Code: 6490 Eide

Eide is a village in Hustadvika Municipality in Møre og Romsdal county, Norway, where it sits on the Romsdal Peninsula at the intersection of the Kornstadfjorden and Kvernesfjorden. The village is about 5 kilometres (3.1 mi) southeast of the small village of Visnes.

The 1.88-square-kilometre (460-acre) village has a population (2024) of 1,496 and a population density of 796 inhabitants per square kilometre (2,060/sq mi).

== History ==
The village served as the administrative centre of the old Eide Municipality from 1897 until its dissolution in 2020. The historic Eide Church is located in the village.
