= Kornstad Church =

Church in Møre og Romsdal, Norway

- Kornstad kyrkje
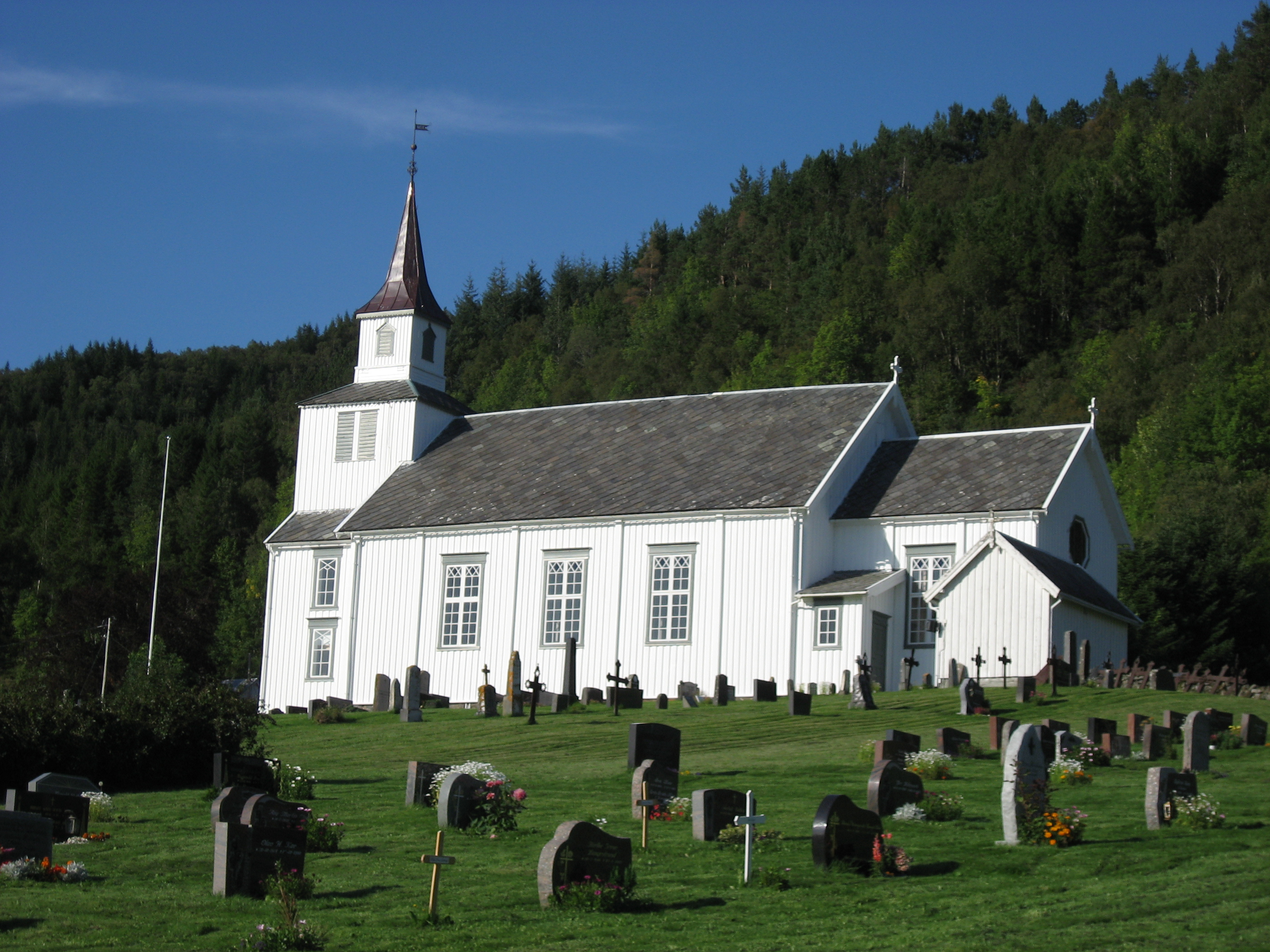
- View of the church
- Kornstad Church
- 62°57′53″N 7°27′24″E
- Location: Averøy Municipality, Møre og Romsdal
- Country: Norway
- Denomination: Church of Norway
- Churchmanship: Evangelical Lutheran

History
- Status: Parish church
- Founded: 14th century
- Consecrated: 1871

Architecture
- Functional status: Active
- Architect: Jacob Wilhelm Nordan
- Architectural type: Long church
- Completed: 1871 (155 years ago)

Specifications
- Capacity: 350
- Materials: Wood

Administration
- Diocese: Møre bispedømme
- Deanery: Ytre Nordmøre prosti
- Parish: Kornstad
- Norwegian Cultural Heritage Site
- Type: Church
- Status: Not protected
- ID: 84822

Kornstad Church (Norwegian: Kornstad kyrkje) is a parish church of the Church of Norway in Averøy Municipality in Møre og Romsdal county, Norway. It is located in the village of Kornstad on the western coast of the island of Averøya, along the Kornstadfjorden. It is the church for the Kornstad parish which is part of the Ytre Nordmøre prosti (deanery) in the Diocese of Møre. The white, wooden church was built in a long church style in 1871 using plans by the architect Jacob Wilhelm Nordan. The church seats about 350 people.

== History ==
The earliest existing historical records of the church date back to the year 1589, but the church was not new that year. The first church in Kornstad was a stave church likely from the 14th century. The first church was built on a site about 65 metres (213 ft) southwest of the present church site. The state archives in Trondheim has a record of a mass held at the church on 17 June 1386. Not much is known about the original church. In 1649, the church was enlarged by adding two timber-framed transepts to the north and south sides of the nave to give the building a cruciform floor plan. In 1761, a new tower was built on the roof and two second floor seating galleries for men were built in the nave. In 1812, new exterior supports were erected around the whole church, as all the walls leaned out towards the cemetery.

In 1814, this church served as an election church (Norwegian: valgkirke). Together with more than 300 other parish churches across Norway, it was a polling station for elections to the 1814 Norwegian Constituent Assembly which wrote the Constitution of Norway. This was Norway's first national elections. Each church parish was a constituency that elected people called "electors" who later met together in each county to elect the representatives for the assembly that was to meet at Eidsvoll Manor later that year.

In 1871, a new church was built about 65 metres (213 ft) to the northeast of the old church. Parts of the new church were constructed in Steinkjer and shipped down to Kornstad. The new church was designed by Jacob Wilhelm Nordan and built by builder Gustav O. Olsen, and it was consecrated in 1871. Many items from the old church were saved and re-used in the present church including the church bells and the two altar candlesticks.

== See also ==
- List of churches in Møre
