= Kvernes =

Village in Averøy Municipality, Norway

- Village
- Interactive map of Kvernes
- Location within Møre og Romsdal Location within Norway
- Coordinates: 63.0058°N 7.7225°E
- Country: Norway
- Region: Western Norway
- County: Møre og Romsdal
- District: Nordmøre
- Municipality: Averøy Municipality
- Elevation: 39 m (128 ft)
- Time zone: UTC+01:00 (CET)
  - Summer (DST): UTC+02:00 (CEST)
- Post Code: 6530 Averøy

Kvernes is a village in Averøy Municipality in Møre og Romsdal county, Norway. It is located on the east coast of the island of Averøya, along the Kvernesfjorden. County Road 247 runs through the village.

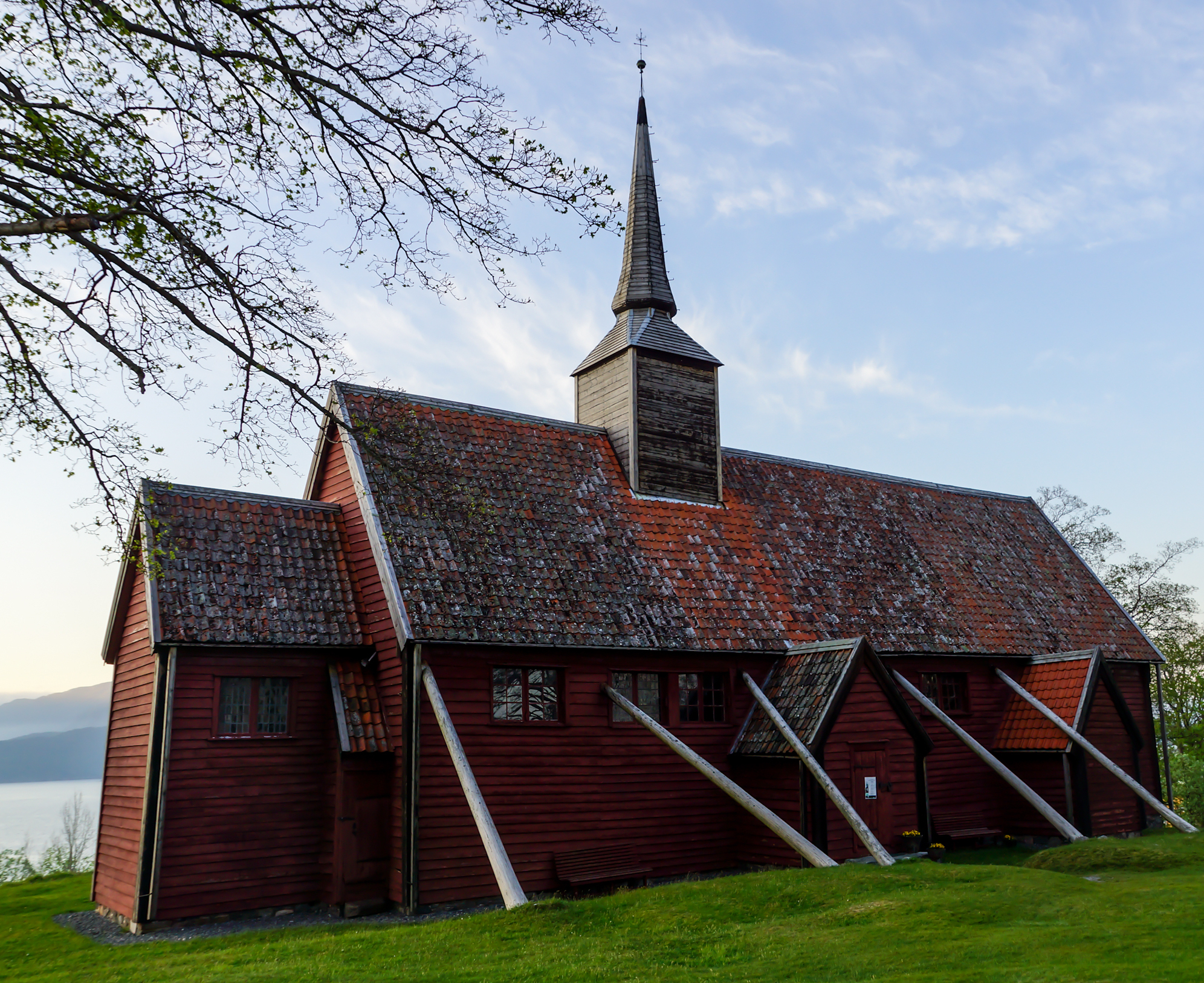
View of the Kvernes Stave Church

== History ==
The village of Kvernes was the administrative centre of the old Kvernes Municipality which existed from 1838 until 1964 when the municipality was dissolved.

There are two churches in Kvernes: Kvernes Stave Church (built in the 17th century) and the Kvernes Church (built in the 19th century). The stave church is now a museum.
