= Kvernes Church =

Church in Møre og Romsdal, Norway

- Kvernes kyrkje
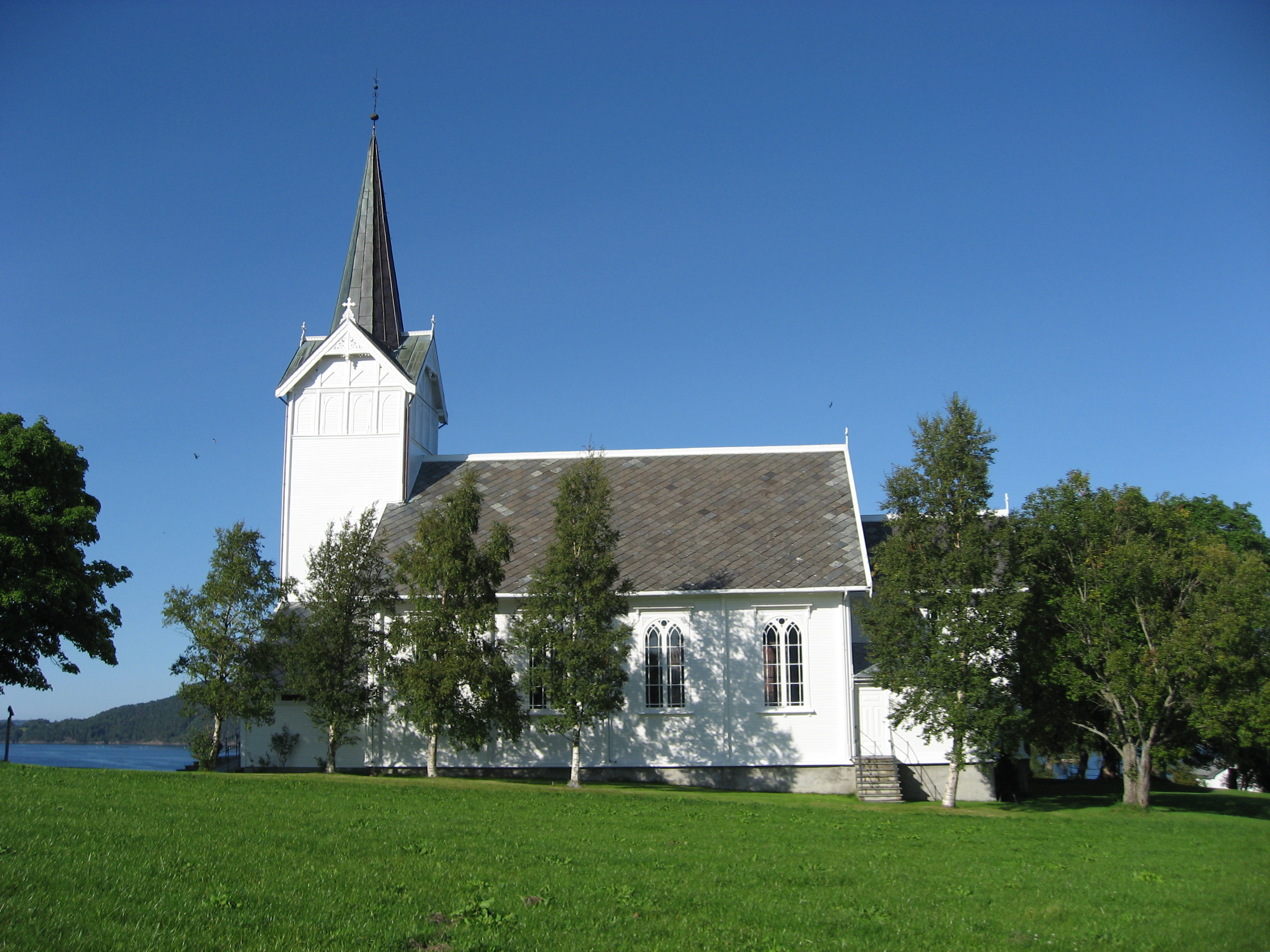
- View of the church
- Kvernes Church
- 63°00′19″N 7°43′18″E
- Location: Averøy Municipality, Møre og Romsdal
- Country: Norway
- Denomination: Church of Norway
- Churchmanship: Evangelical Lutheran

History
- Status: Parish church
- Founded: 1893
- Consecrated: 9 August 1893

Architecture
- Functional status: Active
- Architect: A.K. Thoresen
- Architectural type: Long church
- Completed: 1893 (133 years ago)

Specifications
- Capacity: 350
- Materials: Wood

Administration
- Diocese: Møre bispedømme
- Deanery: Ytre Nordmøre prosti
- Parish: Kvernes
- Norwegian Cultural Heritage Site
- Type: Church
- Status: Listed
- ID: 84862

Kvernes Church (Norwegian: Kvernes kyrkje) is a parish church of the Church of Norway in Averøy Municipality in Møre og Romsdal county, Norway. It is located in the village of Kvernes on the southeastern coast of the island of Averøya. It is the church for the Kvernes parish which is part of the Ytre Nordmøre prosti (deanery) in the Diocese of Møre. The white, wooden church was built in a long church style in 1893 by the architect A.K. Thoresen from Kristiansund. The church seats about 350 people.

== History ==
By the late 1800s, the old Kvernes Stave Church had gotten to be too small for the parish, so it was decided to build a new church right next to the old one. The architect A.K. Thoresen from Kristiansund was hired to design the new building and the job of lead builder was originally awarded to a builder named Hovde (also from Kristiansund), but he died before the work began. The job then went to builder L. Mogstad (also from Kristiansund). The church was consecrated on 9 August 1893. The bells from the old stave church were installed in the new church. It was also decided to keep the old church and turn it into a museum, so that old stave church still stands about 50 metres (160 ft) north of the new Kvernes Church.

== Media gallery ==
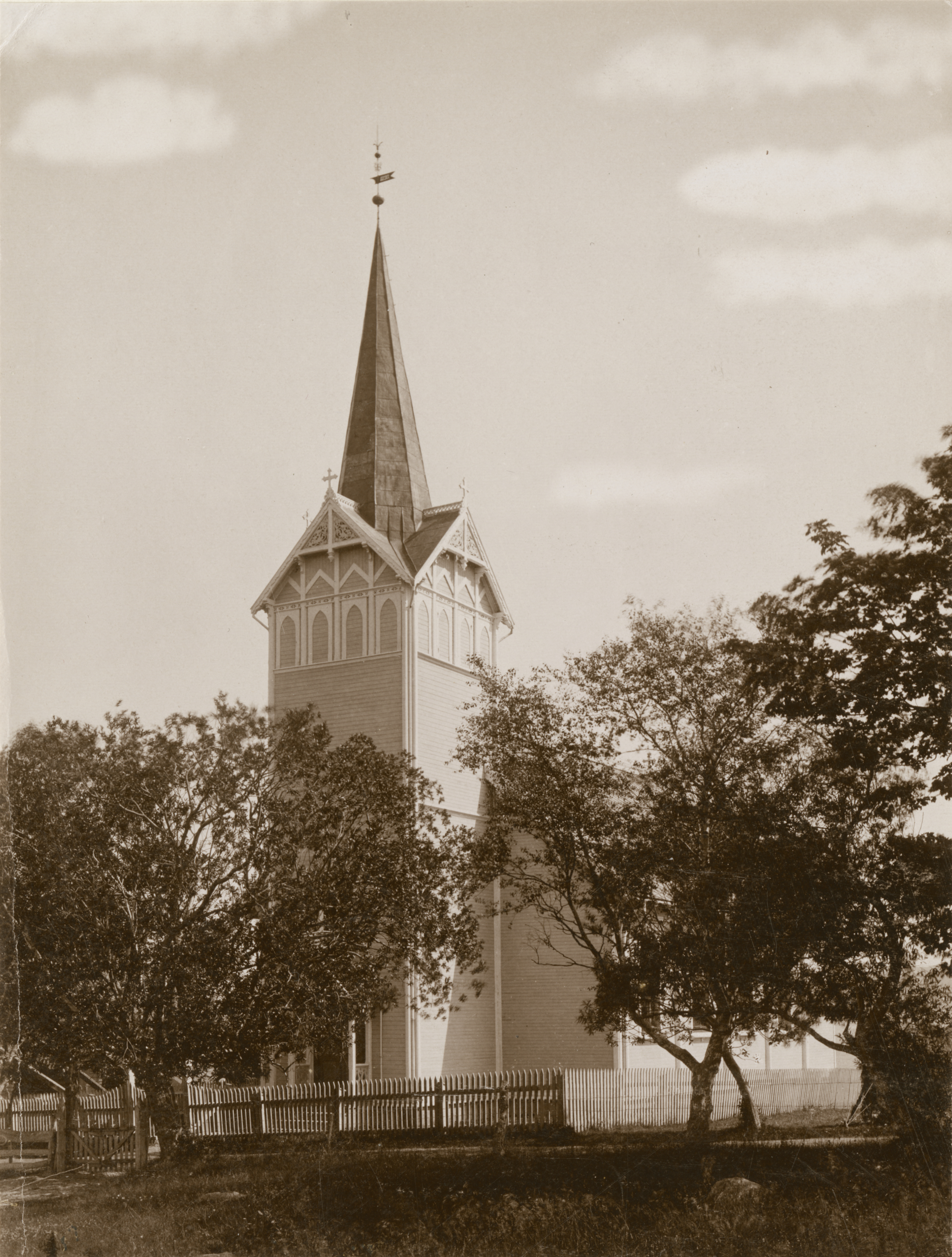

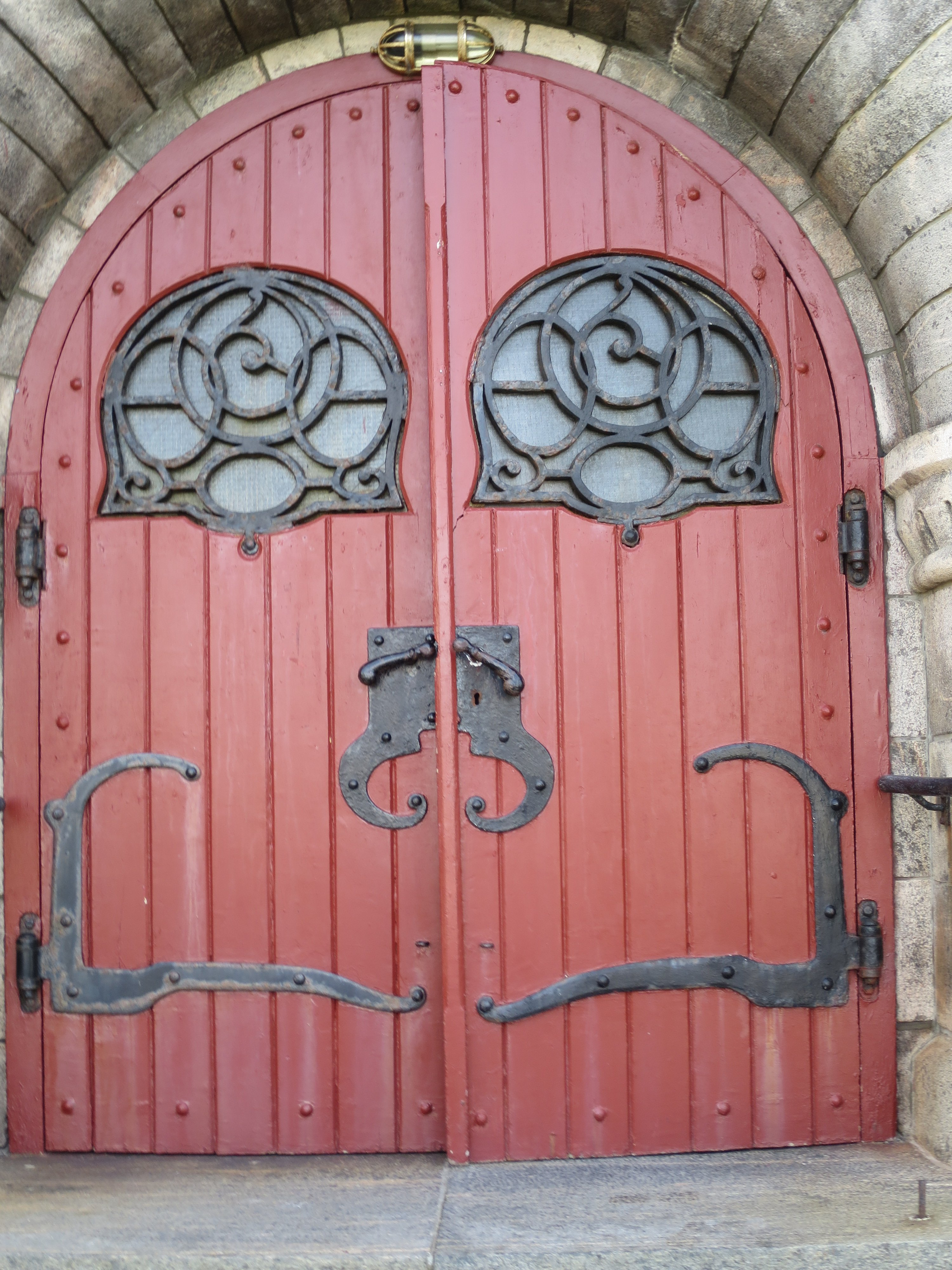

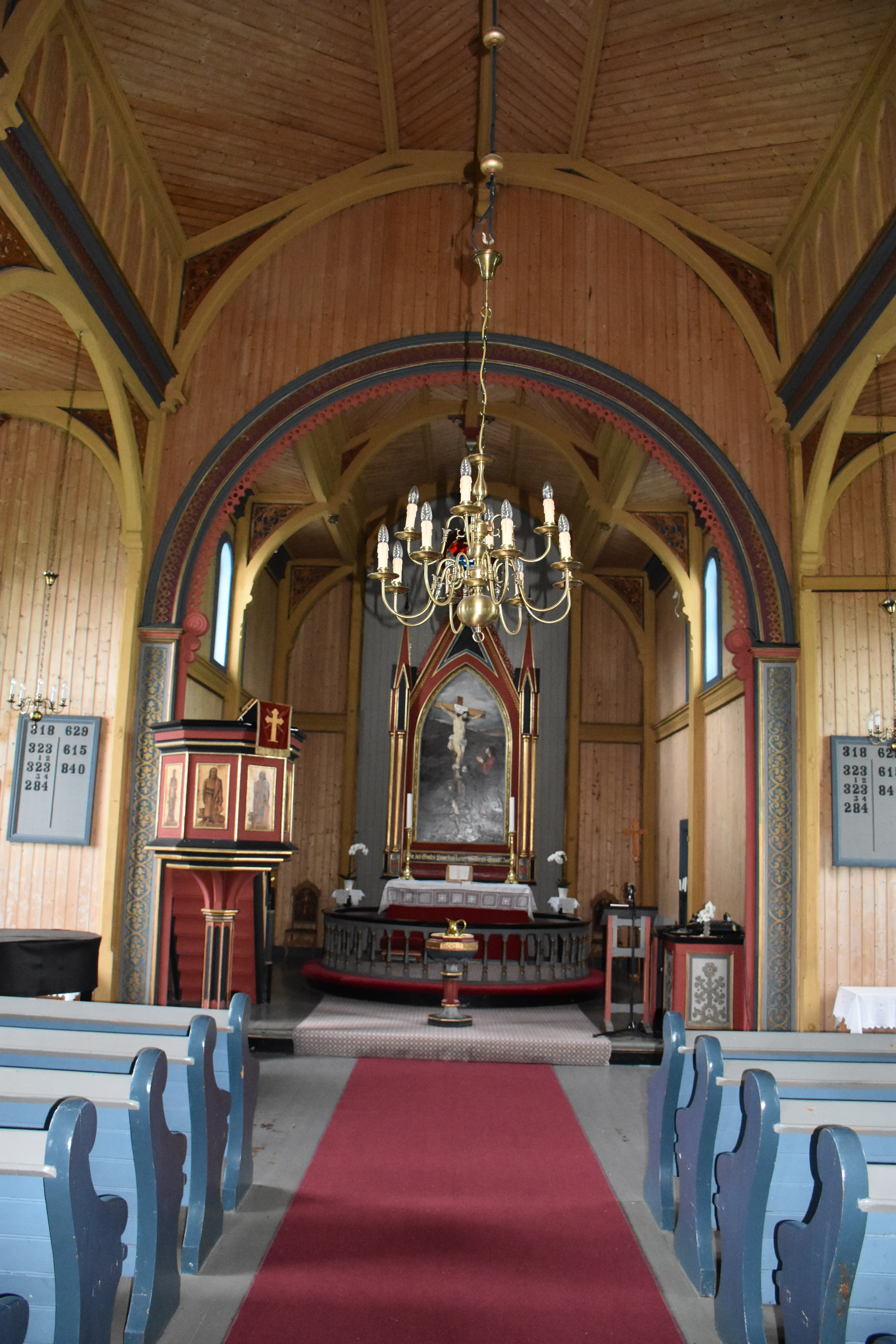

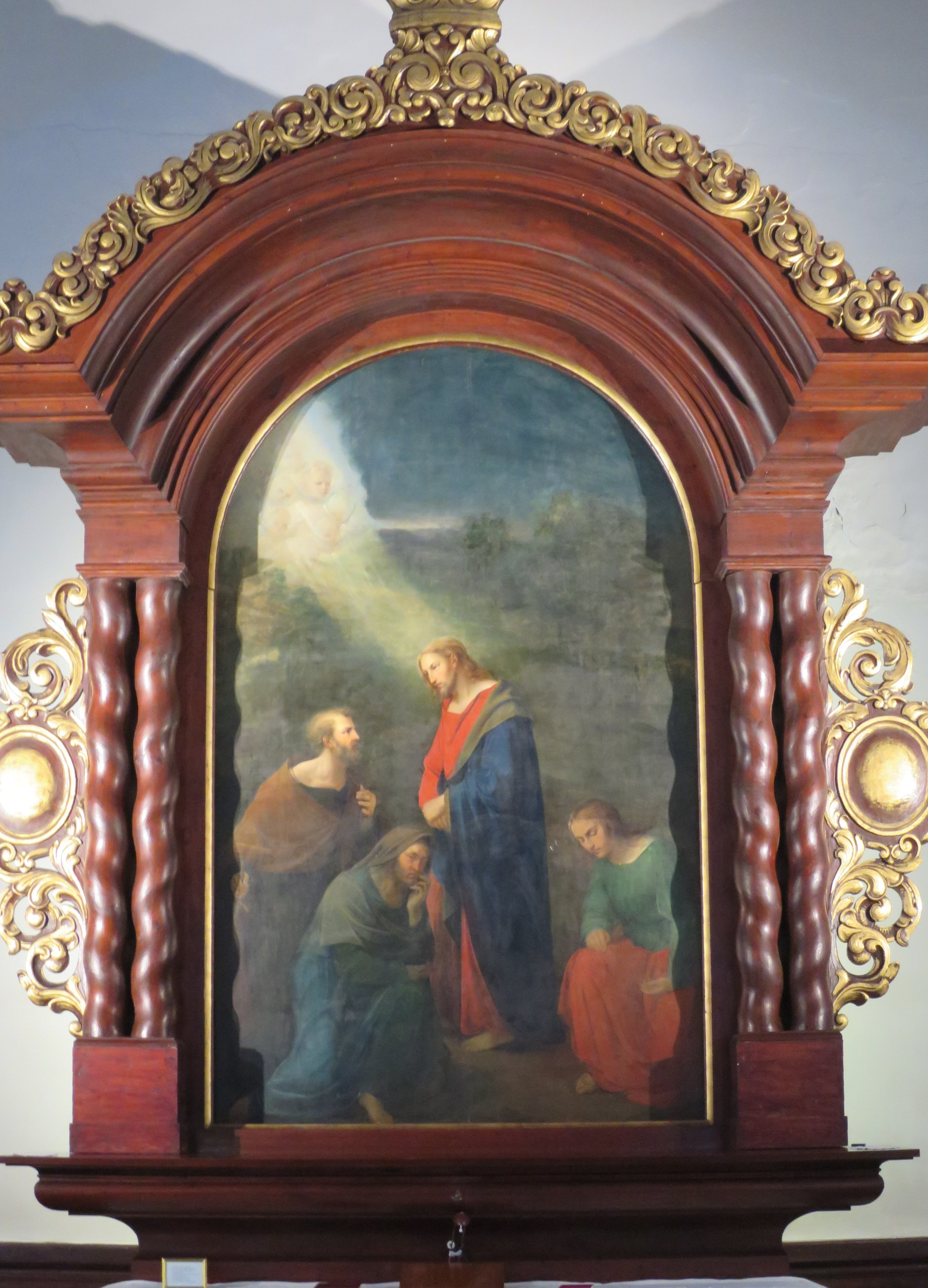

== See also ==
- List of churches in Møre
