= Kvernesfjorden =

Fjord in Møre og Romsdal, Norway

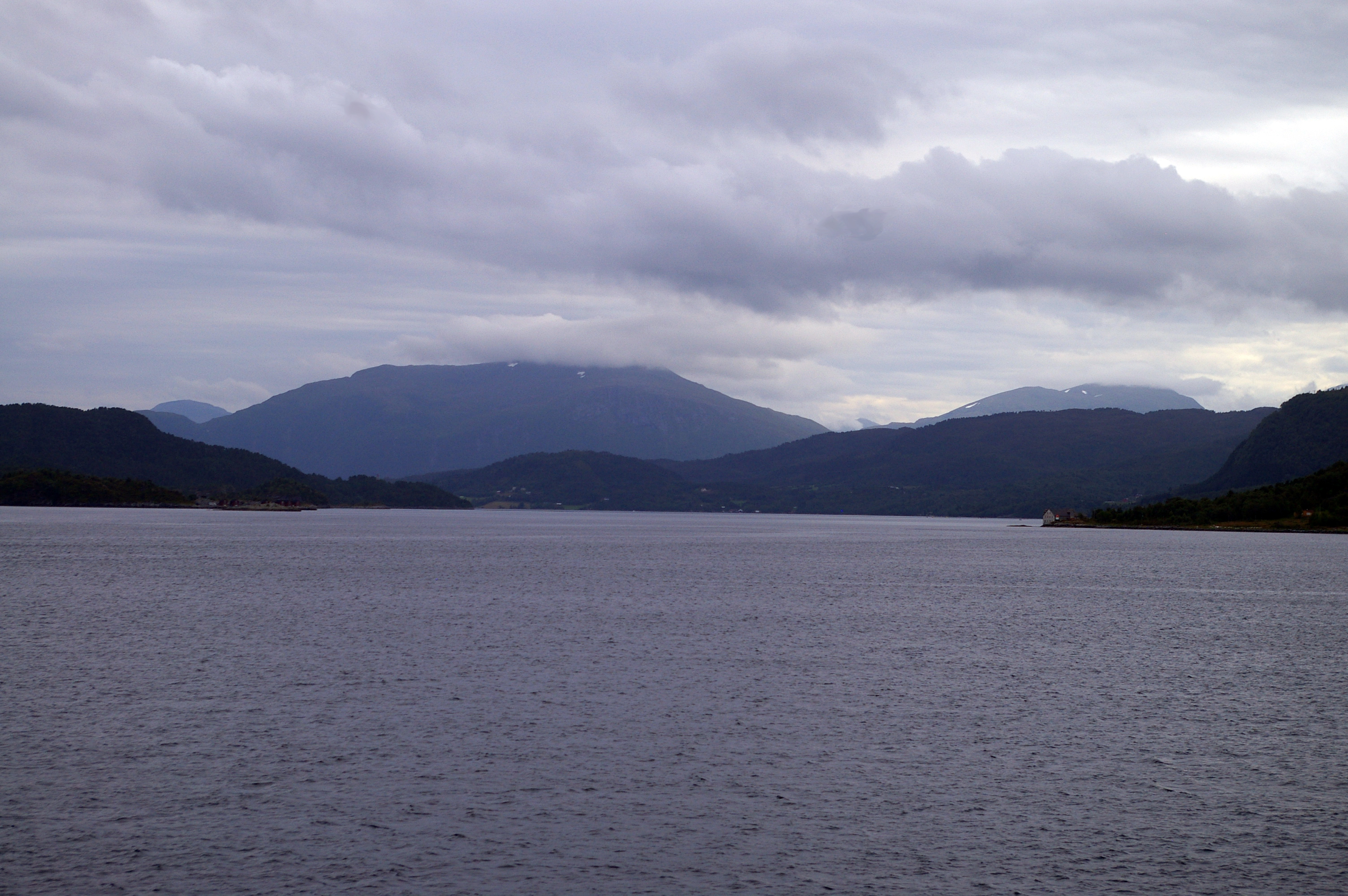
- View of the fjord
- Interactive map of the fjord
- Location: Møre og Romsdal county, Norway
- Coordinates: 62.97767°N 7.67676°E
- Type: Fjord
- Basin countries: Norway
- Max. length: 22 kilometres (14 mi)
- Max. width: 3 kilometres (1.9 mi)

Kvernesfjorden is a fjord between the municipalities of Gjemnes, Kristiansund, Averøy, and Hustadvika in Møre og Romsdal county, Norway. The fjord is about 22 kilometres (14 mi) long.

The fjord begins at the end of the Kornstadfjorden near the village of Eide and runs to the northeast between the island of Averøya and the north shore of the Romsdal peninsula. It then turns to the north around the end of the island of Averøya where it connects to the Bremsnesfjorden. The fjord name comes from the village of Kvernes (and the old Kvernes Municipality) since that is where the old Kvernes Stave Church is located. The village lies along the eastern entrance to the fjord.

== See also ==
- List of Norwegian fjords
