= Kvernes Stave Church =

Church in Møre og Romsdal, Norway

- Kvernes stavkyrkje
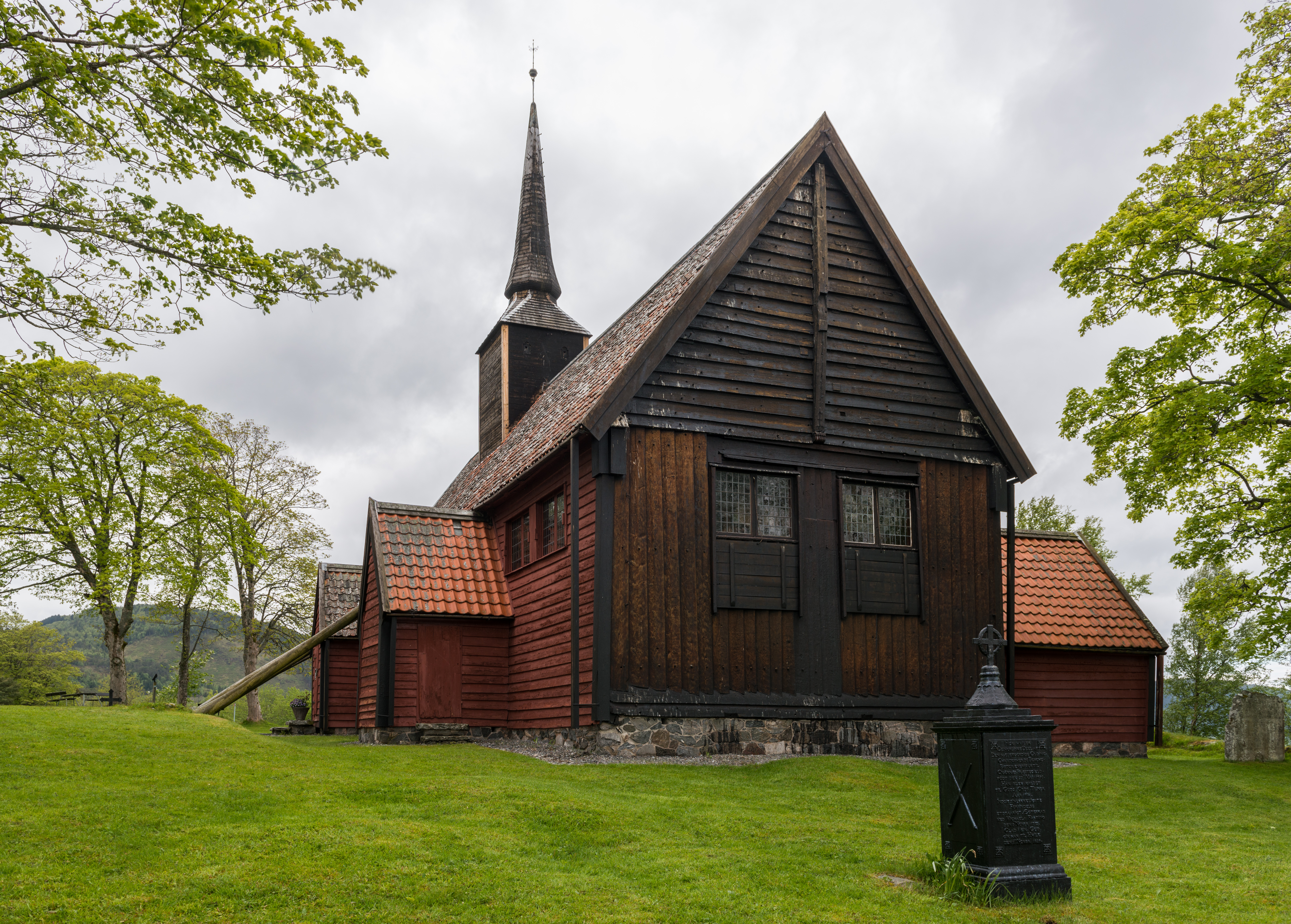
- View of the church
- Kvernes Stave Church
- 63°00′20″N 7°43′19″E
- Location: Averøy Municipality, Møre og Romsdal
- Country: Norway
- Denomination: Church of Norway
- Previous denomination: Catholic Church
- Churchmanship: Evangelical Lutheran

History
- Status: Parish church
- Founded: c. 1300
- Consecrated: c. 1300

Architecture
- Functional status: Museum
- Architectural type: Stave church
- Completed: c. 1300 (726 years ago)
- Closed: 1893

Specifications
- Capacity: 200
- Materials: Wood

Administration
- Diocese: Møre bispedømme
- Deanery: Ytre Nordmøre prosti
- Parish: Kvernes
- Norwegian Cultural Heritage Site
- Type: Church
- Status: Automatically protected
- ID: 84862

Kvernes Stave Church (Norwegian: Kvernes stavkyrkje) is a former parish church of the Church of Norway in Averøy Municipality in Møre og Romsdal county, Norway. The old church sits along the Kvernesfjorden in the village of Kvernes, just to the north of the Kvernes Church, the present church for the parish. The white, wooden church was built in a rectangular stave church style sometime during the first half of the 14th century. The church seats about 200 people.

== History ==
The earliest existing historical records of the church date back to the year 1400, but the stave church was probably built during the early-14th century. The church is a single-nave church of the "Møre"-type, characterized by central posts in the external wall and crossbeams. The small nave measures only 16 by 7.5 metres (52 by 25 ft) and the choir is only 7 by 7.5 metres (23 by 25 ft), making it one of the smallest stave churches in existence. The church was rebuilt in 1633 and during this renovation the front door was moved from the nave's west side to the south side. Also during this renovation, the old choir was torn down and rebuilt in a timber-framed construction rather than the historic stave construction. In 1648, the tower on the roof was repaired. From 1661 to 1663, a church porch was constructed. A sacristy was built around 1689 as well. In 1776, the church was renovated again. In 1810, the tower on the roof was again repaired.

In 1814, this church served as an election church (Norwegian: valgkirke). Together with more than 300 other parish churches across Norway, it was a polling station for elections to the 1814 Norwegian Constituent Assembly which wrote the Constitution of Norway. This was Norway's first national elections. Each church parish was a constituency that elected people called "electors" who later met together in each county to elect the representatives for the assembly that was to meet at Eidsvoll Manor later that year.

In 1893, the parish built a new Kvernes Church about 50 metres (160 ft) south of the old stave church. The stave church was closed after the new church was consecrated in 1893. In 1894, the old building was purchased by a group of individuals who donated it as a gift to Society for the Preservation of Ancient Norwegian Monuments. The society has refurbished the building and it is now a museum.

== Media gallery ==
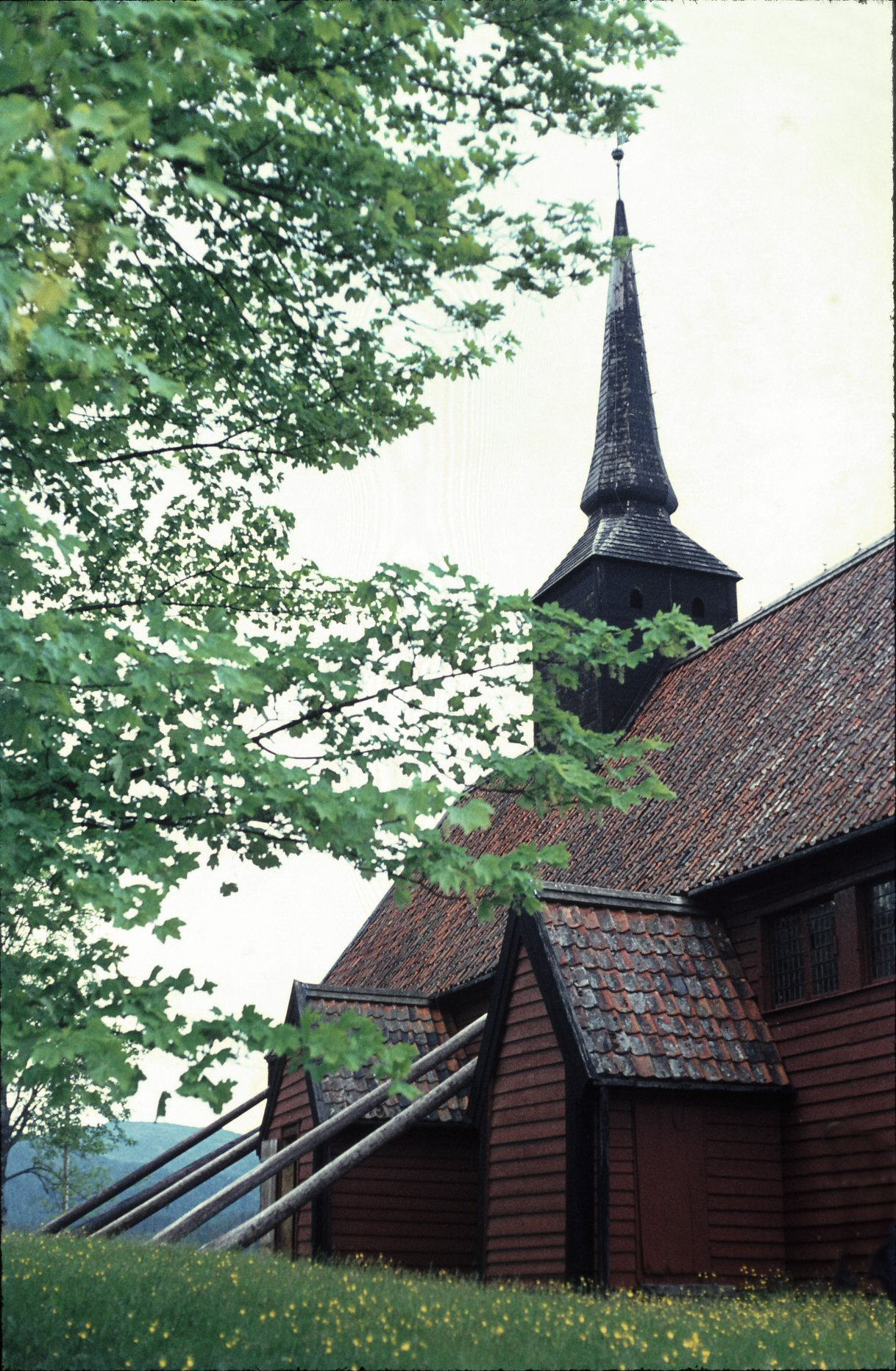

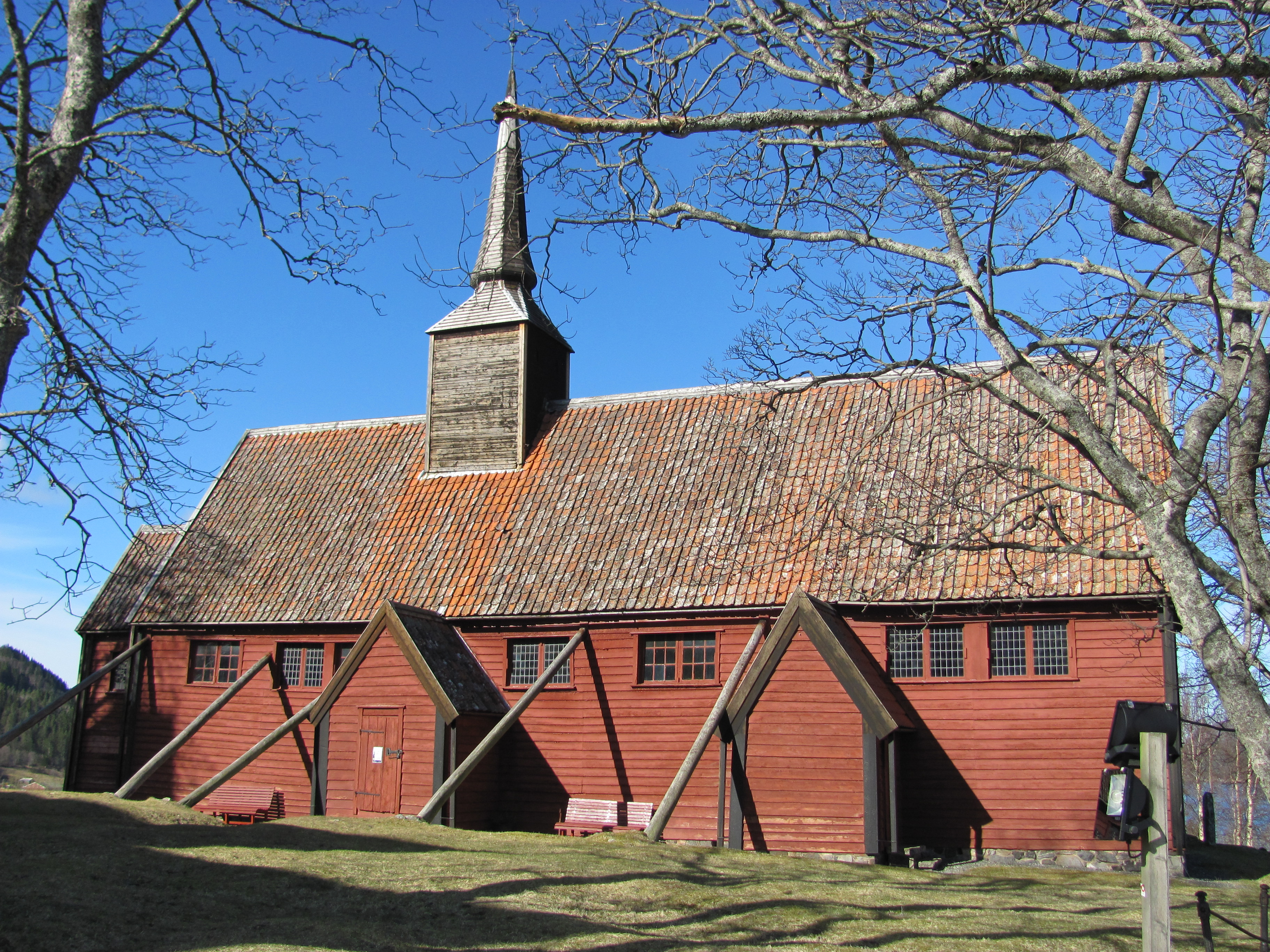
Side view of the church

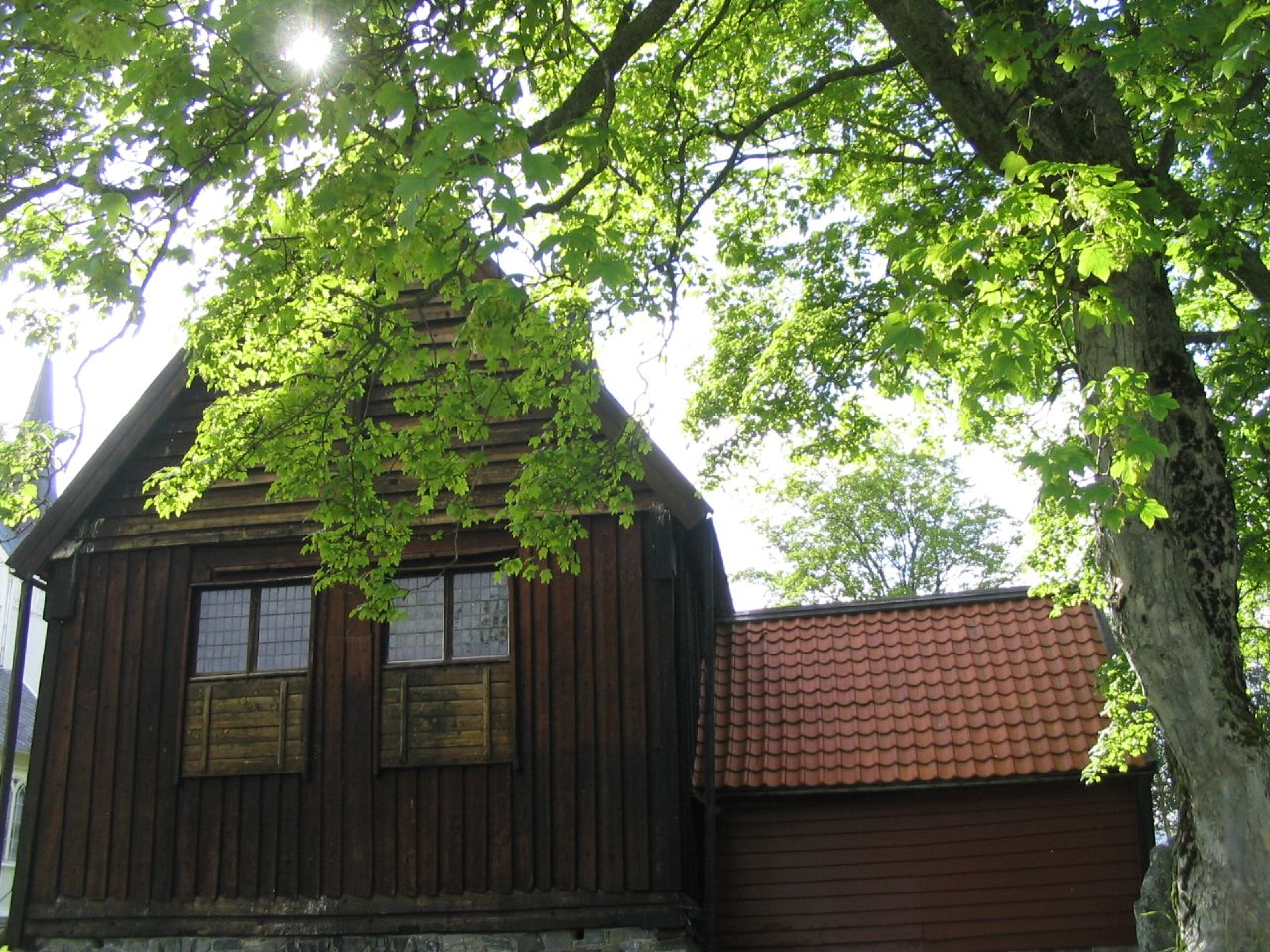
East end of the church

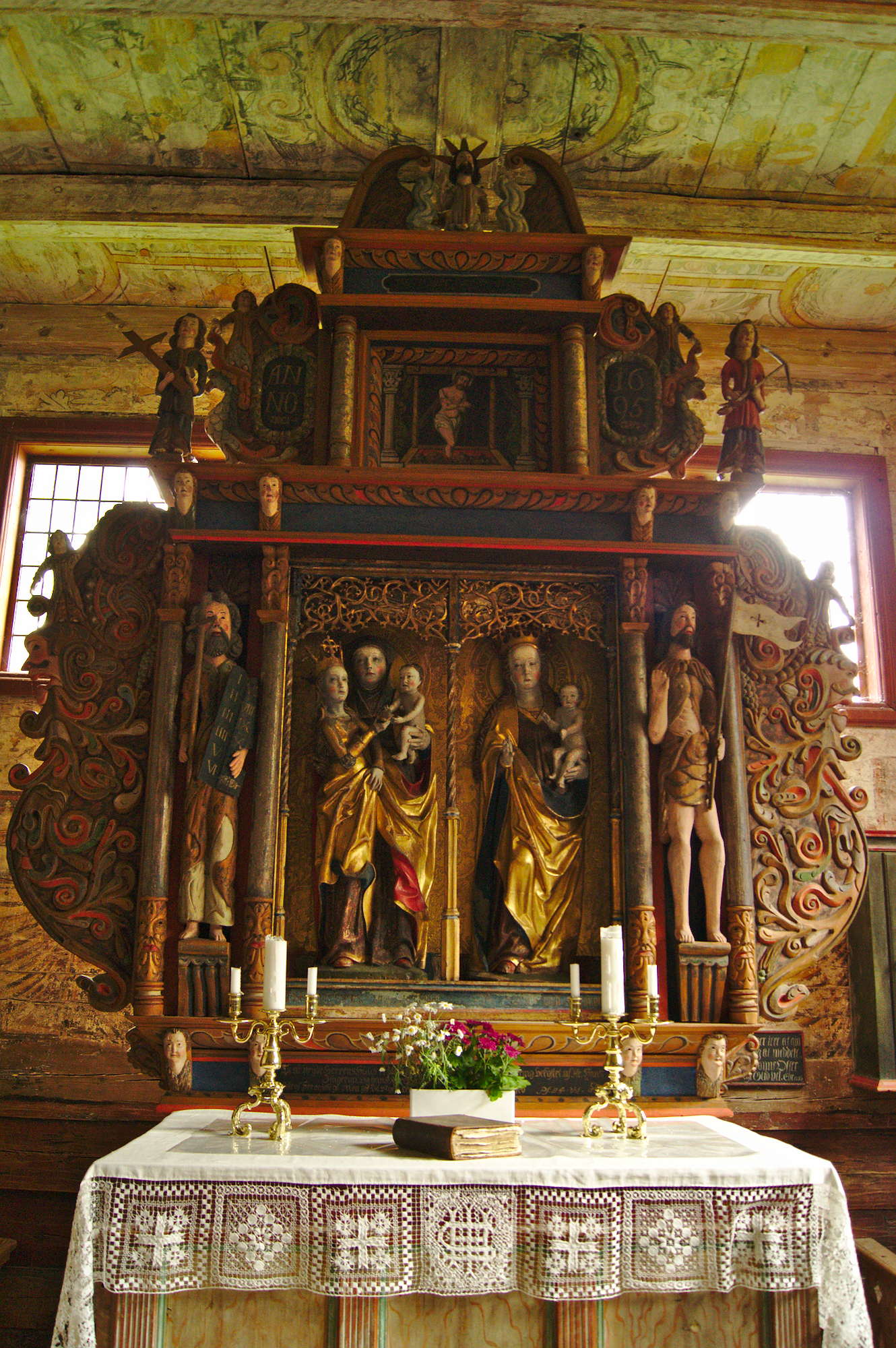
Altar and altarpiece

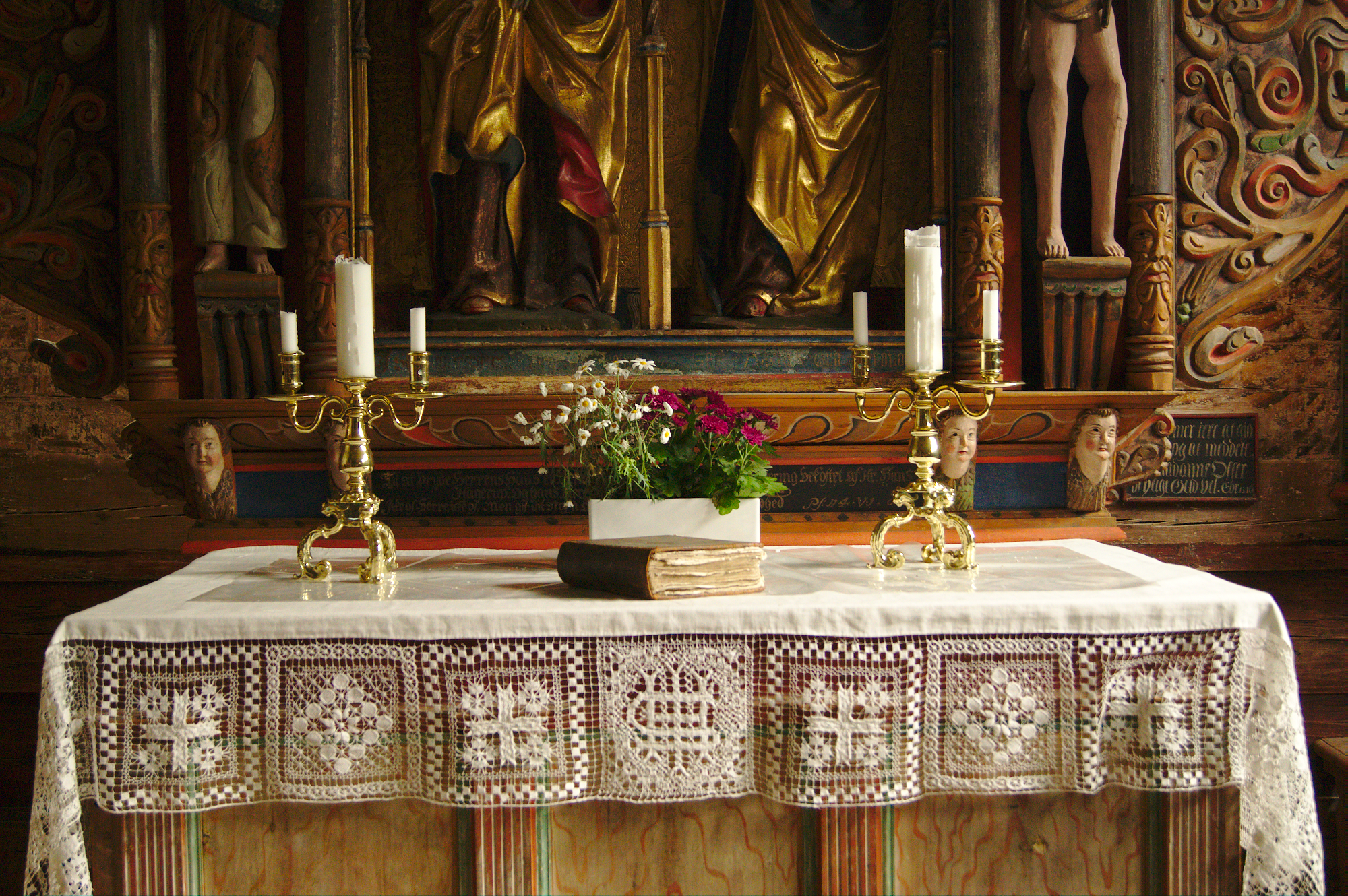
Altar

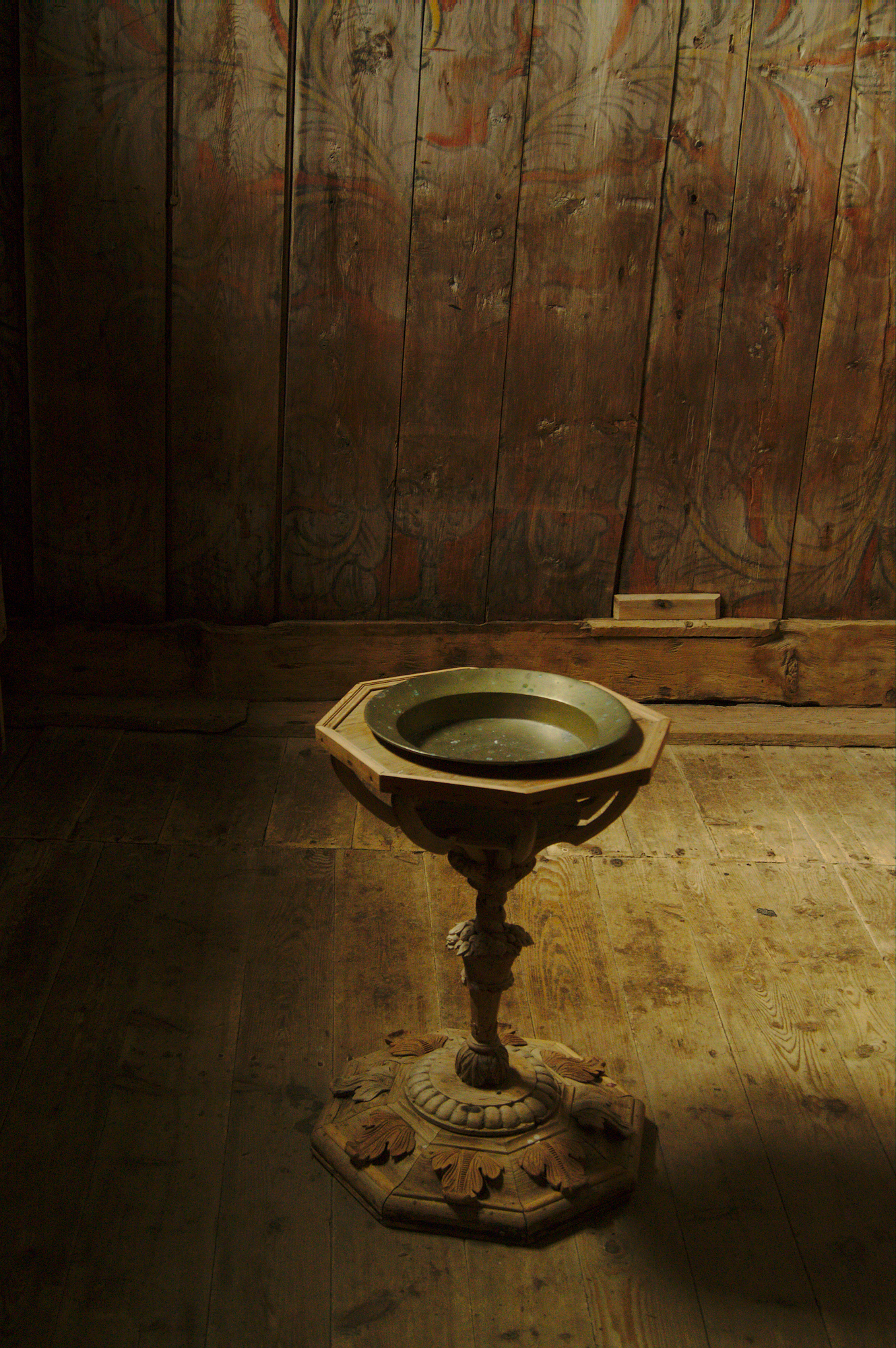
Baptismal font

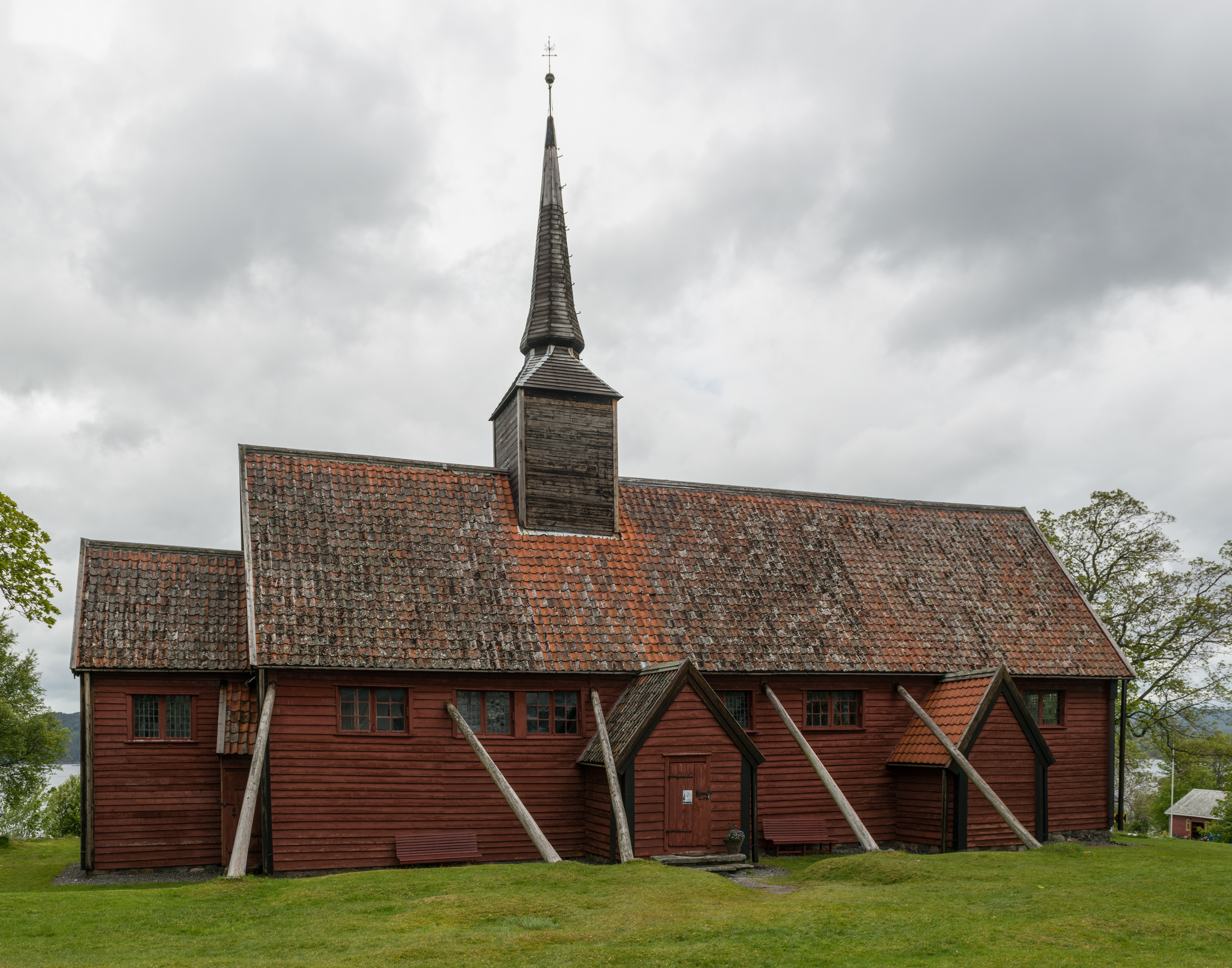

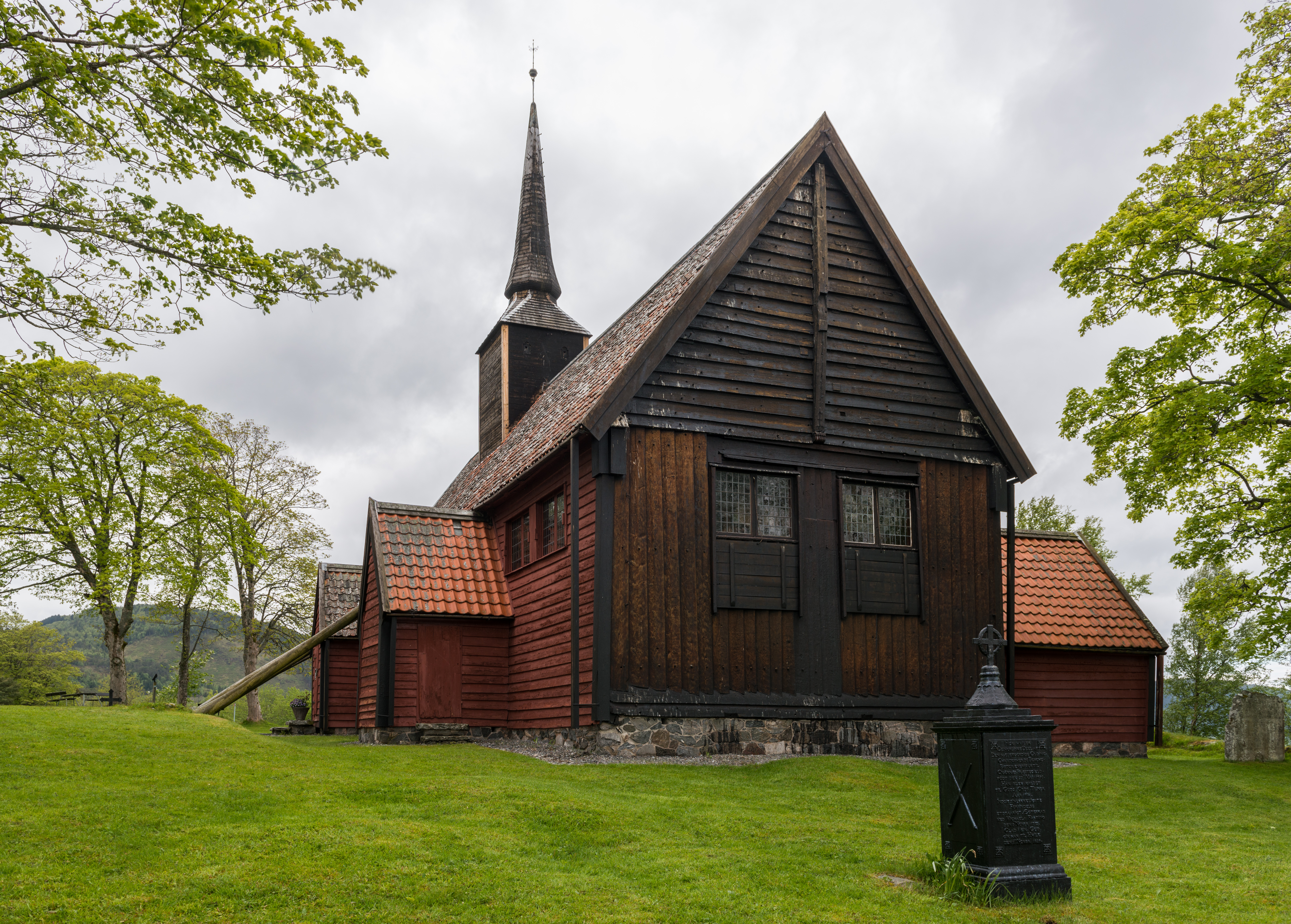

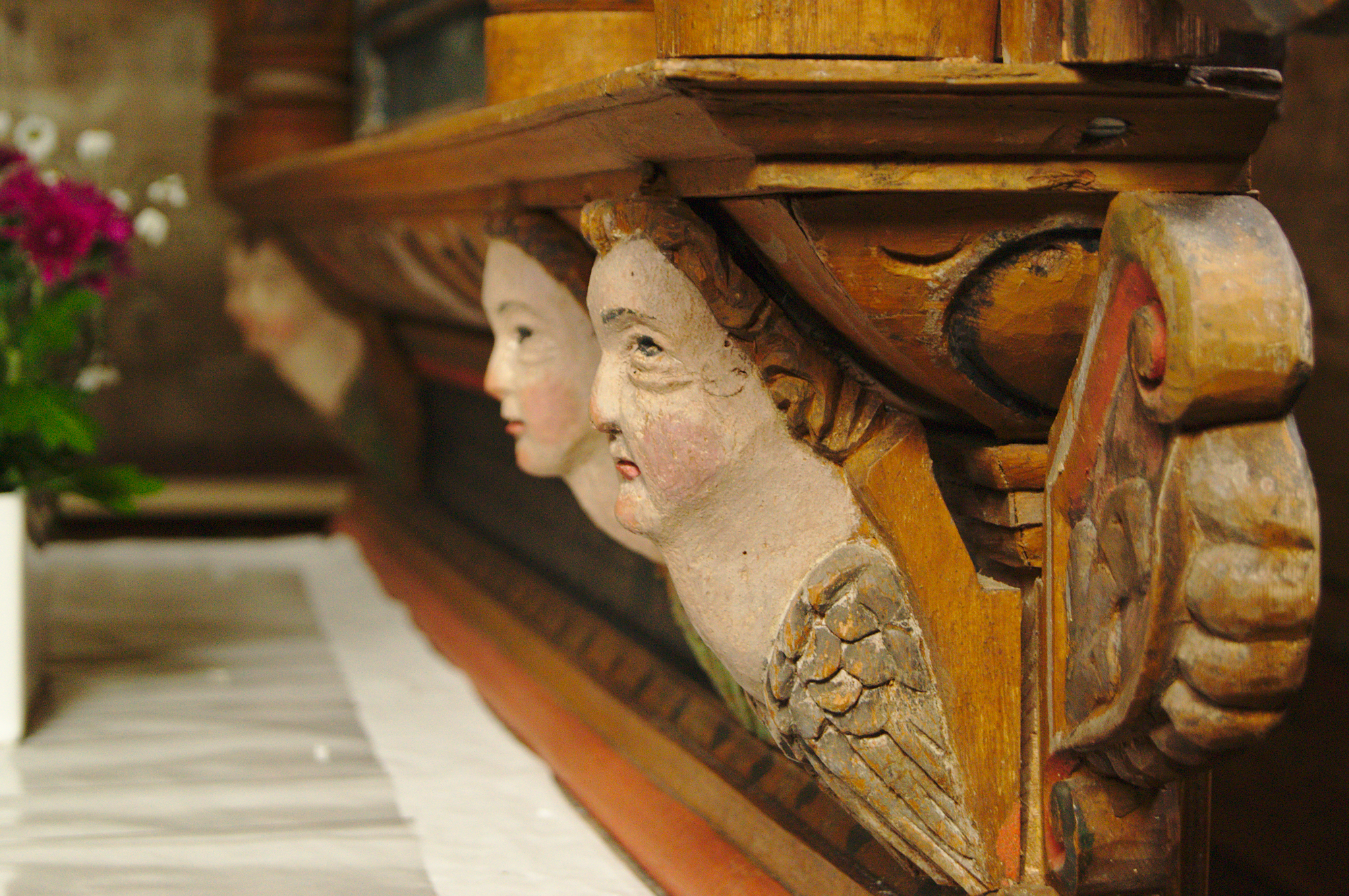

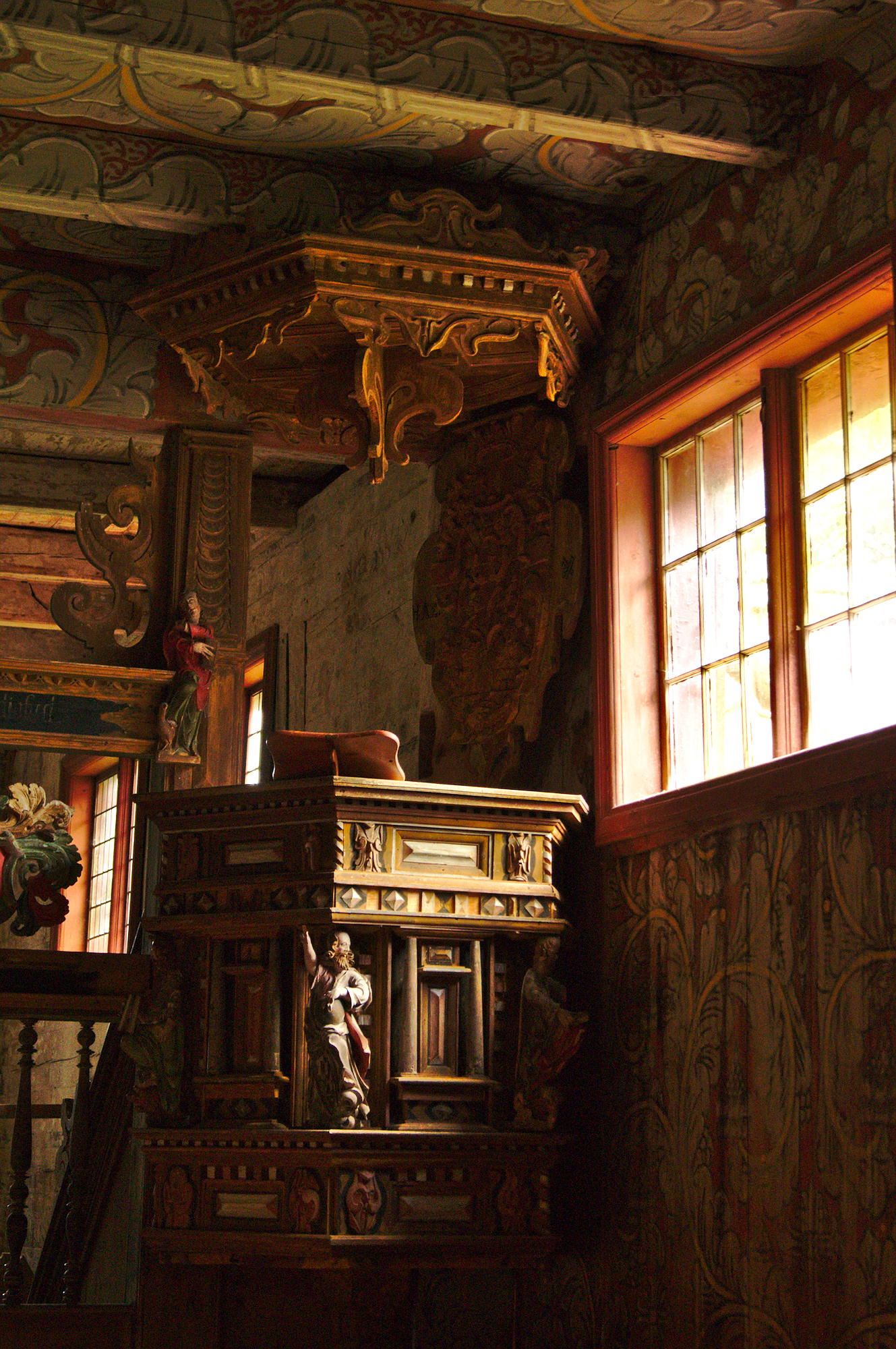

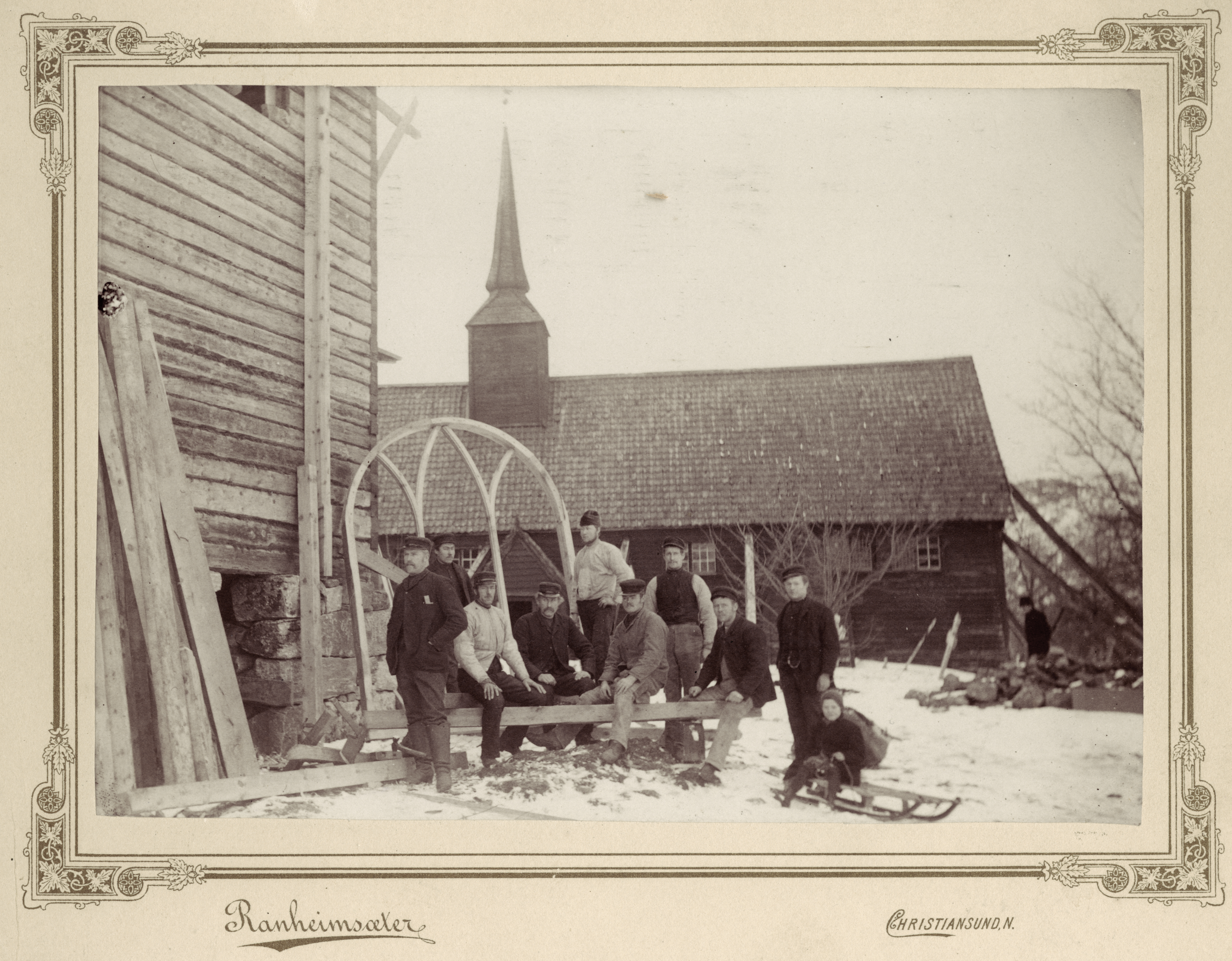

== See also ==
- List of churches in Møre
