= Kornstadfjorden =

Fjord in Møre og Romsdal, Norway

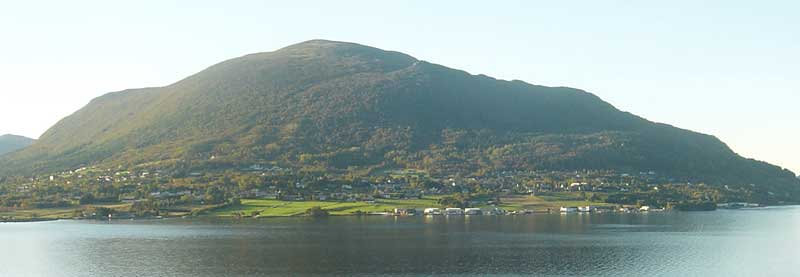
- View of the fjord
- Interactive map of the fjord
- Location: Møre og Romsdal county, Norway
- Coordinates: 62.9665°N 7.4112°E
- Type: Fjord
- Basin countries: Norway
- Max. length: 9 kilometres (5.6 mi)
- Max. width: 3 kilometres (1.9 mi)

Kornstadfjorden is a fjord that runs between Averøy Municipality and Hustadvika Municipality in Møre og Romsdal county, Norway. The 9-kilometre (5.6 mi) long fjord runs between the Romsdal peninsula and the island of Averøya. The villages of Visnes and Eide lie on the west side of the fjord and the village of Kornstad is located on the east side of the fjord.

On the south end of the fjord, it becomes the Kvernesfjorden and runs to the northeast. On the north end of the fjord, it becomes the Lauvøyfjorden, near where the Atlantic Ocean Road (Atlanterhavsveien) crosses the fjord.

== See also ==
- List of Norwegian fjords
