= Visnes, Møre og Romsdal =

Village in Hustadvika Municipality, Norway

Visnes
- Village
- Interactive map of Visnes
- Location within Møre og Romsdal Location within Norway
- Coordinates: 62.9541°N 7.4018°E
- Country: Norway
- Region: Western Norway
- County: Møre og Romsdal
- District: Nordmøre
- Municipality: Hustadvika Municipality
- Elevation: 35 m (115 ft)
- Time zone: UTC+01:00 (CET)
  - Summer (DST): UTC+02:00 (CEST)
- Post Code: 6493 Lyngstad

Visnes is a small village in Hustadvika Municipality in Møre og Romsdal county, Norway. It is located along the Kornstadfjorden, about 5 kilometres (3.1 mi) north of the village of Eide.

Visnes is home to Visnes Kalk AS, a limestone quarry.
