= Sør-Aukra Municipality =

Former municipality in Møre og Romsdal, Norway

Sør-Aukra Municipality Sør-Aukra herred
- Former municipality
- Møre og Romsdal within Norway

- Sør-Aukra within Møre og Romsdal
- Coordinates: 62°42′49″N 06°47′46″E
- Country: Norway
- County: Møre og Romsdal
- District: Romsdal
- Established: 1 Jan 1924
  - Preceded by: Aukra Municipality
- Disestablished: 1 Jan 1965
  - Succeeded by: Midsund Municipality
- Administrative centre: Midsund

Area (upon dissolution)
  - Total: 85 km^{2} (33 sq mi)
  - Rank: #436 in Norway
- Highest elevation: 736.7 m (2,417 ft)

Population (1964)
  - Total: 1,920
  - Rank: #404 in Norway
  - Density: 22.6/km^{2} (59/sq mi)
  - Change (10 years): ▼ −0.8%
- Demonym: Aukraværing

Official language
  - Norwegian form: Nynorsk
- Time zone: UTC+01:00 (CET)
  - Summer (DST): UTC+02:00 (CEST)
- ISO 3166 code: NO-1545

Sør-Aukra is a former municipality in Møre og Romsdal county, Norway. The 85-square-kilometre (33 sq mi) municipality existed from 1924 until its dissolution in 1965. The area is now part of Molde Municipality in the traditional district of Romsdal. The municipality consisted of the entire island of Otrøya, the eastern part of Midøya island, and some small surrounding islands at the entrance to the large Romsdal Fjord. The administrative centre was the village of Midsund.

Prior to its dissolution in 1965, the 85-square-kilometre (33 sq mi) municipality was the 436th largest by area out of the 525 municipalities in Norway. Sør-Aukra Municipality was the 404th most populous municipality in Norway with a population of about 1,920. The municipality's population density was 22.6 inhabitants per square kilometre (59/sq mi) and its population had decreased by 0.8% over the previous 10-year period.

== General information ==
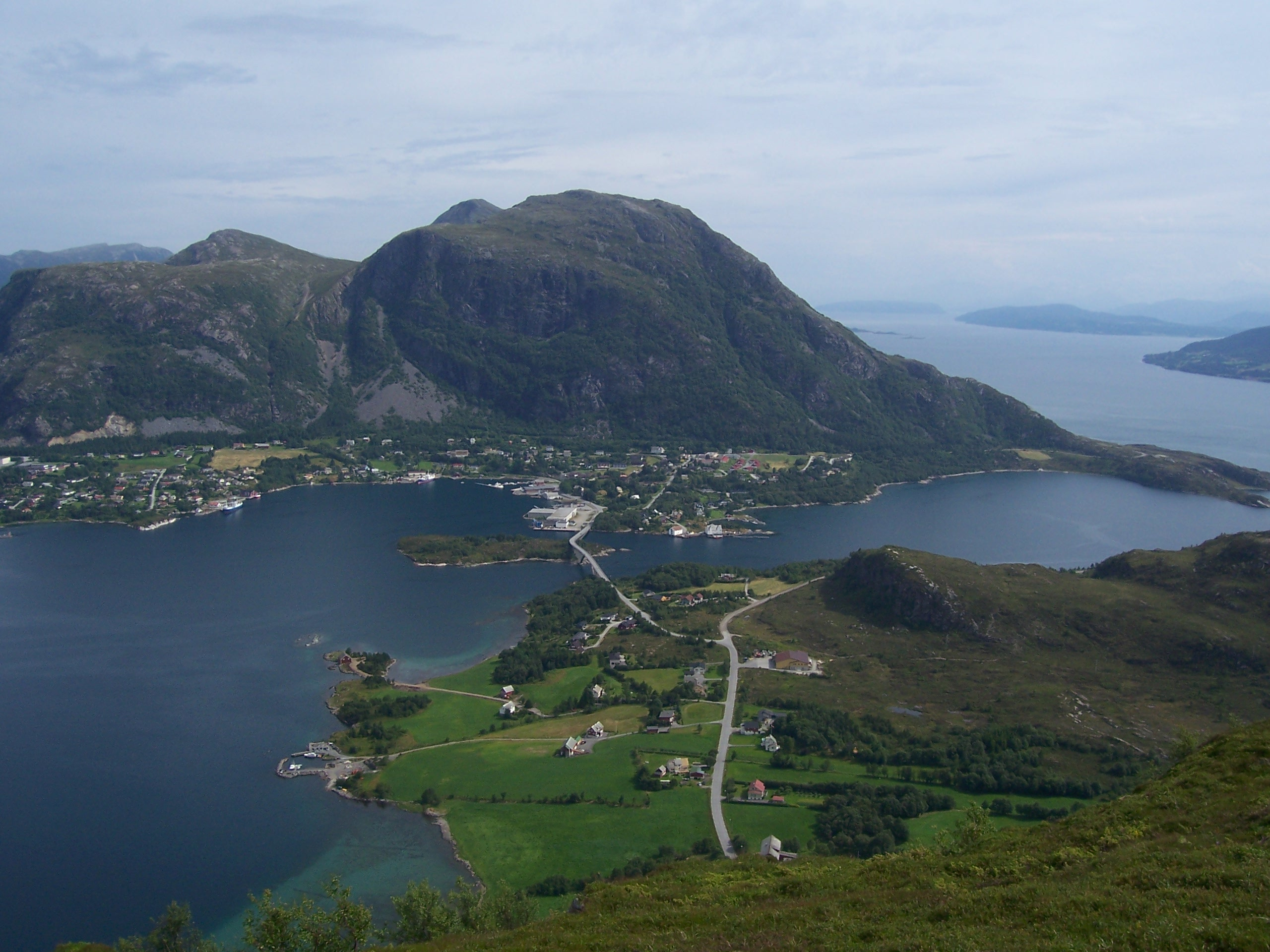
View of the village of Midsund, the administrative centre of Sør-Aukra Municipality

The municipality of Sør-Aukra was established on 1 January 1924 when the old Aukra Municipality was divided into Sør-Aukra Municipality (population: 1,395) in the south and Nord-Aukra Municipality (population: 1,677) in the north.

During the 1960s, there were many municipal mergers across Norway due to the work of the Schei Committee. On 1 January 1965, Sør-Aukra Municipality (population: 1,912) was merged with the island of Dryna and the rest of the island of Midøya (population: 334), both from Vatne Municipality. Together, these areas formed the new Midsund Municipality. At the same time, Nord-Aukra Municipality changed its name back to Aukra Municipality.

=== Name ===
The municipality was created when the old Aukra municipality was divided into two: Nord-Aukra and Sør-Aukra. The prefix sør means "southern". The main part of the name comes from the old Aukra farm (Old Norse: Aukrin) since the first Aukra Church was built there. The first element is akr which means "field" or "acre". The last element is vin which means "meadow" or "pasture".

=== Churches ===
The Church of Norway had one parish (sokn) within Sør-Aukra Municipality. At the time of the municipal dissolution, it was part of the Aukra prestegjeld and the Ytre Romsdal prosti (deanery) in the Diocese of Nidaros.

Churches in Sør-Aukra Municipality
Parish (sokn)	Church name	Location of the church	Year built
Sør-Aukra	Otrøy Church	Uglvik, Otrøya	1878

== Geography ==
The island municipality consisted of the entire island of Otrøya, the eastern part of Midøya island, and some small surrounding islands at the entrance to the large Romsdal Fjord. It was surrounded by Nord-Aukra Municipality to the north and east, Vestnes Municipality and Vatne Municipality to the south, and Sandøy Municipality to the northwest. The highest point in the municipality was the 736.7-metre (2,417 ft) tall mountain Opstadhornet, on the southern part of the island of Otrøya.

== Government ==
While it existed, Sør-Aukra Municipality was responsible for primary education (through 10th grade), outpatient health services, senior citizen services, welfare and other social services, zoning, economic development, and municipal roads and utilities. The municipality was governed by a municipal council of directly elected representatives. The mayor was indirectly elected by a vote of the municipal council. The municipality was under the jurisdiction of the Frostating Court of Appeal.

=== Municipal council ===
The municipal council (Heradsstyre) of Sør-Aukra Municipality was made up of representatives that were elected to four year terms. The tables below show the historical composition of the council by political party.

Sør-Aukra heradsstyre 1963–1964
Party name (in Nynorsk)	Number of representatives
Labour Party (Arbeidarpartiet)	2
Local List(s) (Lokale lister)	15
Total number of members:	17

Sør-Aukra heradsstyre 1959–1963
Party name (in Nynorsk)	Number of representatives
Labour Party (Arbeidarpartiet)	2
Local List(s) (Lokale lister)	15
Total number of members:	17

Sør-Aukra heradsstyre 1955–1959
Party name (in Nynorsk)	Number of representatives
Labour Party (Arbeidarpartiet)	3
Local List(s) (Lokale lister)	14
Total number of members:	17

Sør-Aukra heradsstyre 1951–1955
Party name (in Nynorsk)	Number of representatives
Local List(s) (Lokale lister)	16
Total number of members:	16

Sør-Aukra heradsstyre 1947–1951
Party name (in Nynorsk)	Number of representatives
Labour Party (Arbeidarpartiet)	1
Communist Party (Kommunistiske Parti)	1
Joint List(s) of Non-Socialist Parties (Borgarlege Felleslister)	11
Local List(s) (Lokale lister)	3
Total number of members:	16

Sør-Aukra heradsstyre 1945–1947
Party name (in Nynorsk)	Number of representatives
Labour Party (Arbeidarpartiet)	2
Communist Party (Kommunistiske Parti)	2
Local List(s) (Lokale lister)	12
Total number of members:	16

Sør-Aukra heradsstyre 1937–1941*
Party name (in Nynorsk)	Number of representatives
Labour Party (Arbeidarpartiet)	3
Local List(s) (Lokale lister)	13
Total number of members:	16
Note: Due to the German occupation of Norway during World War II, no elections were held for new municipal councils until after the war ended in 1945.

=== Mayors ===
The mayor (Nynorsk: ordførar) of Sør-Aukra Municipality was the political leader of the municipality and the chairperson of the municipal council. The following people have held this position:

- 1924–1939: Bendik Misund
- 1939–1941: Ivar Tangen
- 1942–1944: Nils K. Rakvåg
- 1945–1948: Peder I. Ræstad
- 1948–1951: Toralf Orvik
- 1951–1959: Alfred Dyrset
- 1959–1964: Knut K. Sjøvik

== See also ==
- List of former municipalities of Norway
