= Midsund Municipality =

Former municipality in Møre og Romsdal, Norway

Midsund Municipality Midsund kommune
- Former municipality
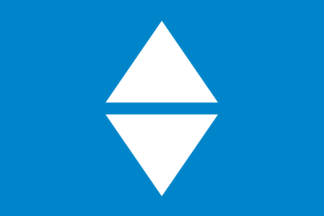
- Flag Coat of arms

- Møre og Romsdal within Norway

- Midsund within Møre og Romsdal
- Coordinates: 62°42′31″N 06°47′48″E
- Country: Norway
- County: Møre og Romsdal
- District: Romsdal
- Established: 1 Jan 1965
  - Preceded by: Sør-Aukra Municipality and Vatne Municipality
- Disestablished: 1 Jan 2020
  - Succeeded by: Molde Municipality
- Administrative centre: Midsund

Government
  - Mayor (2015-2019): Odd Helge Gangstad (Sp)

Area (upon dissolution)
  - Total: 94.65 km^{2} (36.54 sq mi)
  - Land: 93.89 km^{2} (36.25 sq mi)
  - Water: 0.76 km^{2} (0.29 sq mi) 0.8%
  - Rank: #384 in Norway
- Highest elevation: 736.7 m (2,417 ft)

Population (2019)
  - Total: 2,019
  - Rank: #325 in Norway
  - Density: 21.3/km^{2} (55/sq mi)
  - Change (10 years): ▲ +5%
- Demonym(s): Midsunding; Midsundværing

Official language
  - Norwegian form: Nynorsk
- Time zone: UTC+01:00 (CET)
  - Summer (DST): UTC+02:00 (CEST)
- ISO 3166 code: NO-1545

Midsund is a former municipality in Møre og Romsdal county, Norway. The 95-square-kilometre (37 sq mi) municipality existed from 1965 until its dissolution in 2020. The area is now part of Molde Municipality in the traditional district of Romsdal. The administrative centre was the village of Midsund on Otrøya island. Other settlements on the island included Uglvik and Raknes in the north and Nord-Heggdal in the southeast.

The municipality consisted of many islands. The main islands were Otrøya, Midøya, and Dryna, as well as the smaller populated islands of Magerøya and Tautra—both are less than 1 square kilometre (250 acres). There were also many tiny uninhabited islands and skerries. The islands all sit at the mouth of the great Romsdalsfjord.

At the time of its dissolution in 2020, the 95-square-kilometre (37 sq mi) municipality was the 384th largest by area out of the 422 municipalities in Norway. Midsund Municipality was the 325th most populous municipality in Norway with a population of 2,019. The municipality's population density was 21.3 inhabitants per square kilometre (55/sq mi) and its population had increased by 5% over the previous 10-year period.

== General information ==
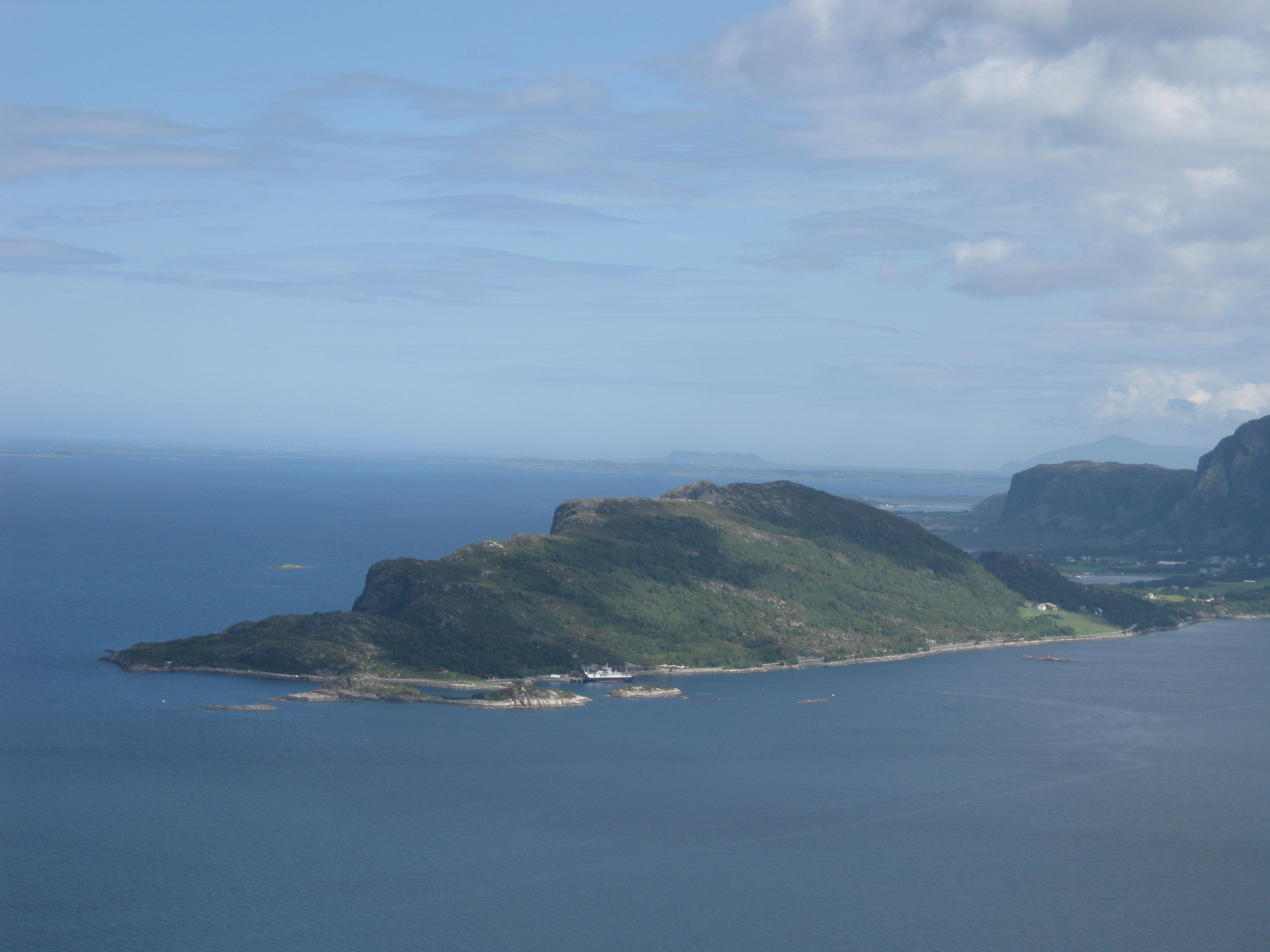
View of Dryna island, looking northeast

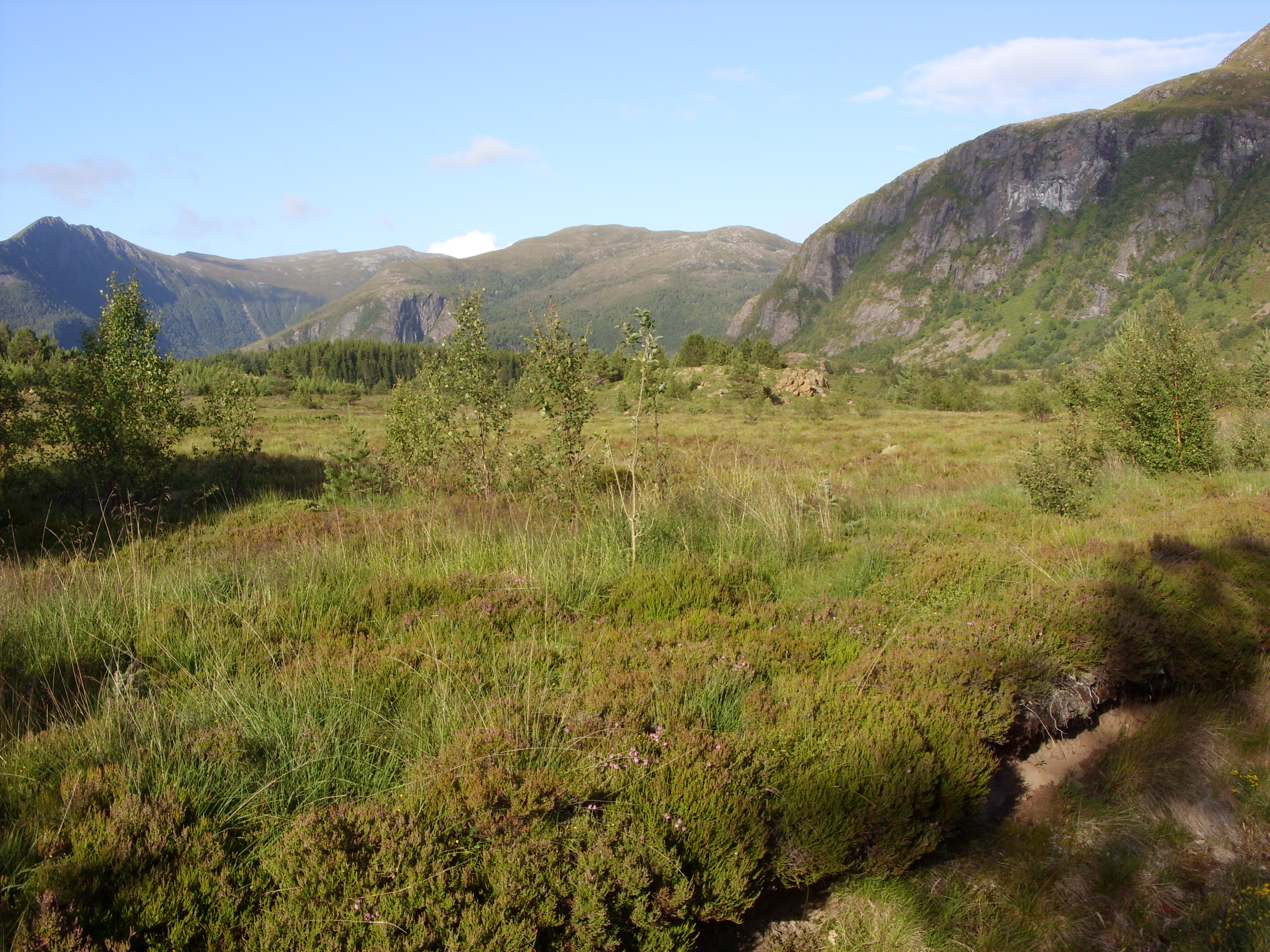
View of the interior of Otrøya island

The municipality of Midsund was established on 1 January 1965 when the old Sør-Aukra Municipality (population: 1,912) was merged with part of Midøya island and the neighboring island of Dryna (population: 334) which were part of the old Vatne Municipality.

On 1 January 2020, Midsund Municipality (population: 2,049) and Nesset Municipality (population: 2,946) were merged into the neighboring Molde Municipality. Together, the new Molde Municipality is significantly larger.

=== Name ===
The municipality (originally the parish) is named after the Midsundet (Old Norse: Miðjusund), the strait that flows between the islands of Otrøya and Midøya. The first element is miðja which means "middle" or "centre". The last element is sund which means "strait" or "sound".

=== Coat of arms ===
The coat of arms was granted on 15 May 1987. The official blazon is "Azure, two triangles argent the lower reversed" (Norwegian: På blå grunn to sølv trekantar, den nedste vend nedover). This means the arms have a blue field (background) and the charge is two triangles one over the other so that they look like a mirror image. The triangles have a tincture of argent which means they are commonly colored white, but if the arms are made out of metal, then silver is used. The two triangles represent the islands of Otrøya and Midøya in the ocean. These two main islands in the municipality are separated by a small strait, the Midsund. The geographical situation is symbolised in the arms. The arms were designed by Jarle Skuseth. The municipal flag has the same design as the coat of arms.

=== Churches ===
The Church of Norway had one parish (sokn) within Midsund Municipality. It was part of the Molde domprosti (arch-deanery) in the Diocese of Møre.

Churches in Midsund Municipality
Parish (sokn)	Church name	Location of the church	Year built
Midsund	Otrøy Church	Uglvik, Otrøya	1878
Midsund	Nord-Heggdal Chapel	Nord-Heggdal	1974

=== Media ===
The newspaper Øyavis was published in Midsund from 1983 to 2016.

== Geography ==
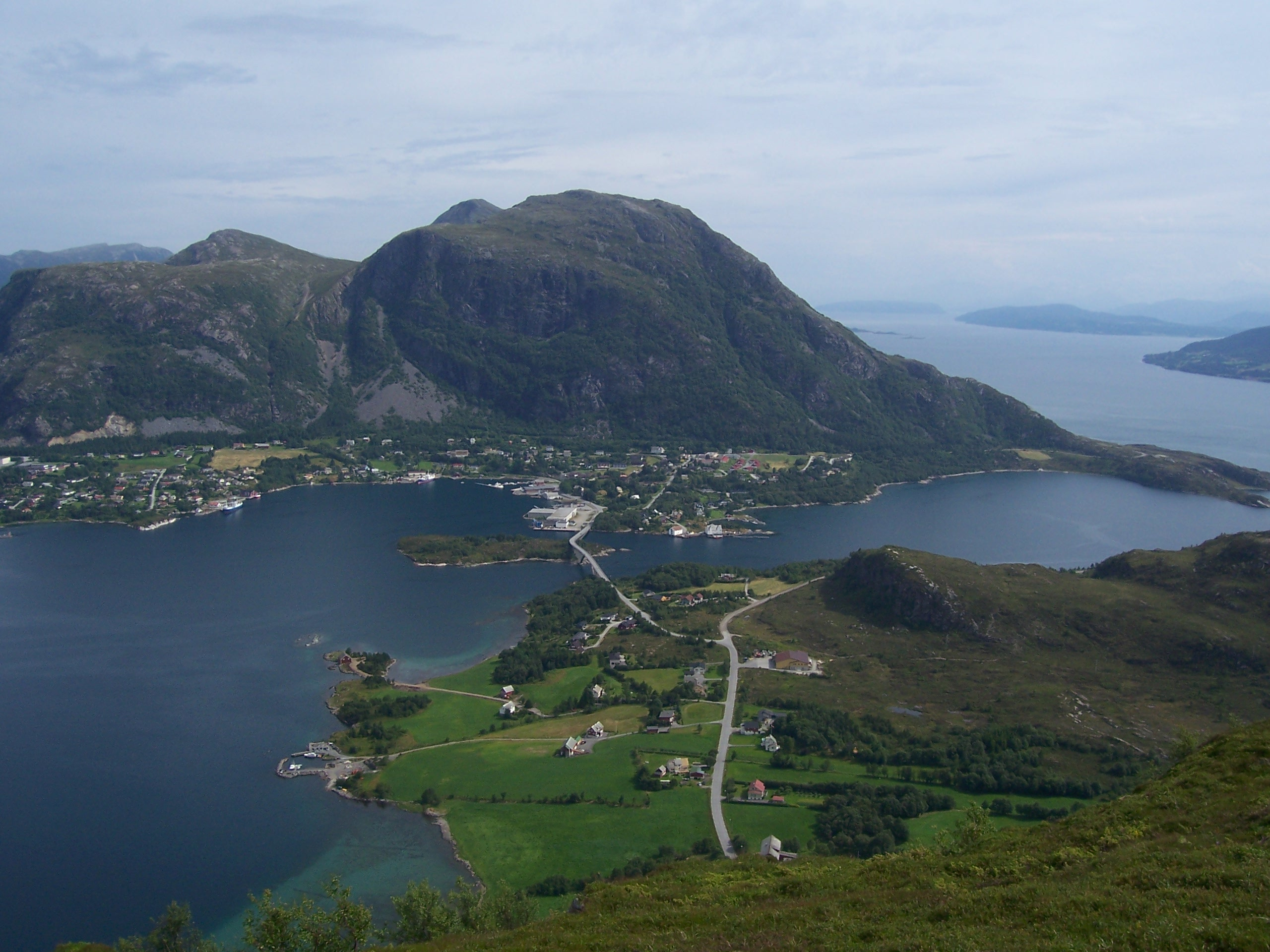
Midsund village seen from the opposite shore of the small strait that separates the islands Otrøya (far side) and Midøya.

The islands of Midsund Municipality are separated from the mainland by the 2-kilometre (1.2 mi) wide Julsundet strait to the east and the 3-kilometre (1.9 mi) wide Midfjorden to the south. To the north are many smaller islands including Gossa and Orta (in Aukra Municipality) plus Harøya and Sandøya (in Ålesund Municipality). To the west lie the islands of Fjørtofta, Skuløya, and Haramsøya (in Haram Municipality).

The three largest islands of the municipality were located in a line from ENE to WSW (Otrøya, Midøya, and Dryna). The island of Magerøya lies between Midøya and Otrøya and a bridge connects it to the latter. Tautra lies in the Moldefjorden, southeast of Otrøya. Otrøya was the main island of the community, measuring about 20 kilometres (12 mi) from east to west. The southern coasts of Otrøya, Midøya, and Dryna rise from the fjord as sheer 800-metre (2,600 ft) tall cliffs. At Oppstad, the cliff is feared to collapse, which would cause a small megatsunami in the Moldefjorden. The highest point in the municipality was the 736.7-metre (2,417 ft) tall mountain Opstadhornet.

On the southern coast of Otrøya the following small villages can be found: (from east to west) Solholmen, Nord-Heggdal, Oppstad, Sør-Heggdal, and Klauset. The north has the following villages: (east to west) Ræstad, Rakvåg, Tangen, Raknes, and Uglvik. On the western side of Otrøya, facing the bay that separates it from Midøya, lies the village of Midsund, the largest settlement in the community. The Midsund Bridge connects it with Midøya. Dryna and Midøya are also connected with a bridge. Ferries run between the islands and the mainland. There is a ferry from Solholmen across the Julsundet to the mainland of Molde Municipality and from the island of Dryna to the village of Brattvåg (in Haram Municipality). The larger three islands' interior is wilderness, but the rims are used for keeping cattle and small farming.

== Government ==
While it existed, Midsund Municipality was responsible for primary education (through 10th grade), outpatient health services, senior citizen services, welfare and other social services, zoning, economic development, and municipal roads and utilities. The municipality was governed by a municipal council of directly elected representatives. The mayor was indirectly elected by a vote of the municipal council. The municipality was under the jurisdiction of the Romsdal District Court and the Frostating Court of Appeal.

=== Municipal council ===
The municipal council (Kommunestyre) of Midsund Municipality is made up of 17 representatives that are elected to four year terms. The tables below show the historical composition of the council by political party.

Midsund kommunestyre 2015–2019
Party name (in Nynorsk)	Number of representatives
Labour Party (Arbeidarpartiet)	3
Progress Party (Framstegspartiet)	1
Conservative Party (Høgre)	5
Christian Democratic Party (Kristeleg Folkeparti)	1
Centre Party (Senterpartiet)	4
Liberal Party (Venstre)	3
Total number of members:	17

Midsund kommunestyre 2011–2015
Party name (in Nynorsk)	Number of representatives
Progress Party (Framstegspartiet)	5
Conservative Party (Høgre)	4
Christian Democratic Party (Kristeleg Folkeparti)	2
Centre Party (Senterpartiet)	3
Liberal Party (Venstre)	3
Total number of members:	17

Midsund kommunestyre 2007–2011
Party name (in Nynorsk)	Number of representatives
Labour Party (Arbeidarpartiet)	2
Conservative Party (Høgre)	6
Christian Democratic Party (Kristeleg Folkeparti)	2
Centre Party (Senterpartiet)	5
Liberal Party (Venstre)	1
Cross-party list (Tverrpolitisk liste)	1
Total number of members:	17

Midsund kommunestyre 2003–2007
Party name (in Nynorsk)	Number of representatives
Labour Party (Arbeidarpartiet)	2
Conservative Party (Høgre)	6
Christian Democratic Party (Kristeleg Folkeparti)	2
Centre Party (Senterpartiet)	3
Liberal Party (Venstre)	2
Cross-party list (Tverrpolitisk liste)	2
Total number of members:	17

Midsund kommunestyre 1999–2003
Party name (in Nynorsk)	Number of representatives
Labour Party (Arbeidarpartiet)	3
Conservative Party (Høgre)	1
Christian Democratic Party (Kristeleg Folkeparti)	3
Centre Party (Senterpartiet)	4
Liberal Party (Venstre)	1
Cross-party list (Tverrpolitisk liste)	9
Total number of members:	21

Midsund kommunestyre 1995–1999
Party name (in Nynorsk)	Number of representatives
Labour Party (Arbeidarpartiet)	4
Conservative Party (Høgre)	4
Christian Democratic Party (Kristeleg Folkeparti)	3
Centre Party (Senterpartiet)	4
Liberal Party (Venstre)	2
Cross-party list (Tverrpolitisk liste)	4
Total number of members:	21

Midsund kommunestyre 1991–1995
Party name (in Nynorsk)	Number of representatives
Labour Party (Arbeidarpartiet)	5
Conservative Party (Høgre)	5
Christian Democratic Party (Kristeleg Folkeparti)	3
Centre Party (Senterpartiet)	4
Liberal Party (Venstre)	1
Cross-party list (Tverrpolitisk list)	3
Total number of members:	21

Midsund kommunestyre 1987–1991
Party name (in Nynorsk)	Number of representatives
Labour Party (Arbeidarpartiet)	5
Progress Party (Framstegspartiet)	2
Conservative Party (Høgre)	5
Christian Democratic Party (Kristeleg Folkeparti)	3
Centre Party (Senterpartiet)	3
Liberal Party (Venstre)	1
Socialist common list (Sosialistisk samlingsliste)	1
Cross-party list (Tverrpolitisk liste)	1
Total number of members:	21

Midsund kommunestyre 1983–1987
Party name (in Nynorsk)	Number of representatives
Labour Party (Arbeidarpartiet)	4
Progress Party (Framstegspartiet)	2
Conservative Party (Høgre)	4
Christian Democratic Party (Kristeleg Folkeparti)	3
Centre Party (Senterpartiet)	4
Liberal Party (Venstre)	2
Socialist common list (Sosialistisk samlingsliste)	1
Cross-party list (Tverrpolitisk liste)	1
Total number of members:	21

Midsund kommunestyre 1979–1983
Party name (in Nynorsk)	Number of representatives
Labour Party (Arbeidarpartiet)	5
Conservative Party (Høgre)	4
Christian Democratic Party (Kristeleg Folkeparti)	4
Centre Party (Senterpartiet)	4
Liberal Party (Venstre)	1
Socialist common list (Sosialistisk samlingsliste)	1
Non-party list (Upolitisk liste)	2
Total number of members:	21

Midsund kommunestyre 1975–1979
Party name (in Nynorsk)	Number of representatives
Labour Party (Arbeidarpartiet)	3
Christian Democratic Party (Kristeleg Folkeparti)	3
Centre Party (Senterpartiet)	8
Socialist Left Party (Sosialistisk Venstreparti)	1
Liberal Party (Venstre)	1
Local list for Midøy (Krinsliste for Midøy)	1
Raknes local list (Raknes Krinsliste)	1
Non-party list (Upolitisk Liste)	3
Total number of members:	21

Midsund kommunestyre 1971–1975
Party name (in Nynorsk)	Number of representatives
Labour Party (Arbeidarpartiet)	1
Christian Democratic Party (Kristeleg Folkeparti)	2
Centre Party (Senterpartiet)	5
Liberal Party (Venstre)	1
Local List(s) (Lokale lister)	12
Total number of members:	21

Midsund kommunestyre 1967–1971
Party name (in Nynorsk)	Number of representatives
Labour Party (Arbeidarpartiet)	4
Christian Democratic Party (Kristeleg Folkeparti)	2
Centre Party (Senterpartiet)	5
Liberal Party (Venstre)	1
Local List(s) (Lokale lister)	9
Total number of members:	21

=== Mayors ===
The mayor (Nynorsk: ordførar) of Midsund Municipality was the political leader of the municipality and the chairperson of the municipal council. The following people have held this position:

- 1965–1969: Knut K. Sjøvik (Sp)
- 1970–1971: Kåre Straume (Ap)
- 1972–1983: Kristofer Reiten (Sp)
- 1984–1989: Harry Edvardsen (H)
- 1990–1991: Per Håvard Klauset (Sp)
- 1992–1995: Harry Edvardsen (H)
- 1995–2003: Ketil Ugelvik (LL)
- 2003–2011: Helge Orten (H)
- 2011–2015: Einar Øien (FrP)
- 2015–2019: Odd Helge Gangstad (Sp)

== See also ==
- List of former municipalities of Norway
