= Vatne Municipality =

Former municipality in Møre og Romsdal, Norway

Vatne Municipality Vatne herred
- Former municipality
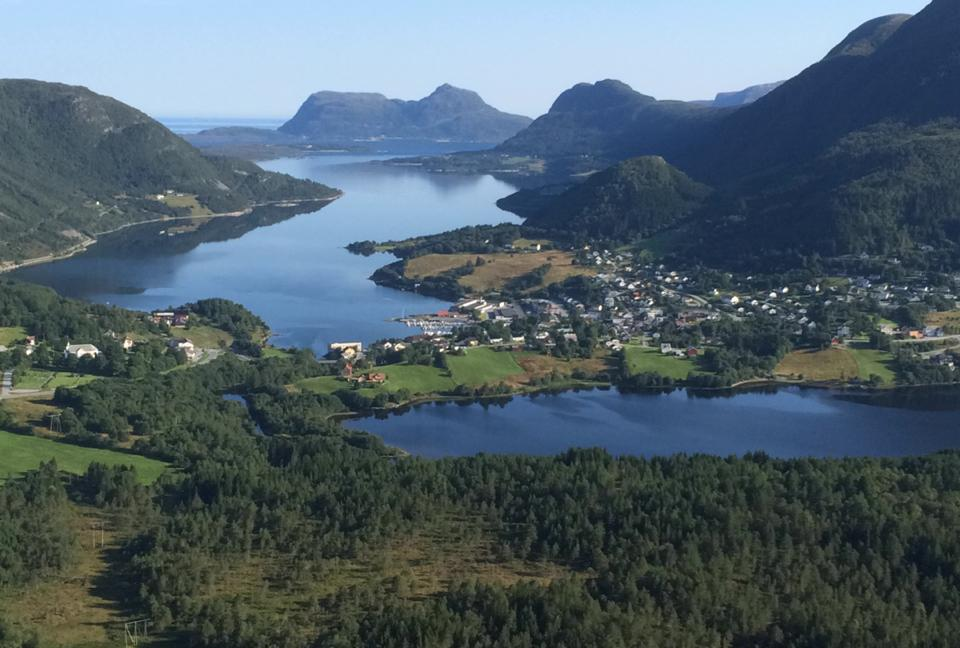
- View of the Vatne area

- Møre og Romsdal within Norway

- Vatne within Møre og Romsdal
- Coordinates: 62°33′24″N 06°38′13″E
- Country: Norway
- County: Møre og Romsdal
- District: Sunnmøre
- Established: 1 Jan 1902
  - Preceded by: Skodje Municipality
- Disestablished: 1 Jan 1965
  - Succeeded by: Haram Municipality
- Administrative centre: Vatne

Government
  - Mayor (1963–1965): Mads Skaar

Area (upon dissolution)
  - Total: 136.9 km^{2} (52.9 sq mi)
  - Rank: #387 in Norway
- Highest elevation: 1,069 m (3,507 ft)

Population (1964)
  - Total: 2,558
  - Rank: #340 in Norway
  - Density: 18.7/km^{2} (48/sq mi)
  - Change (10 years): ▲ +11.8%
- Demonym(s): Vatnebygdar; Vatnebygder

Official language
  - Norwegian form: Nynorsk
- Time zone: UTC+01:00 (CET)
  - Summer (DST): UTC+02:00 (CEST)
- ISO 3166 code: NO-1530

Vatne is a former municipality in Møre og Romsdal county, Norway. The 137-square-kilometre (53 sq mi) municipality existed from 1902 until its dissolution in 1965. The municipality included land and islands surrounding the Midfjorden and Vatnefjorden in what is now part of Haram Municipality and Molde Municipality. The administrative centre was the village of Vatne where Vatne Church is located.

Prior to its dissolution in 1965, the 136.9-square-kilometre (52.9 sq mi) municipality was the 387th largest by area out of the 525 municipalities in Norway. Vatne Municipality was the 340th most populous municipality in Norway with a population of about 2,558. The municipality's population density was 18.7 inhabitants per square kilometre (48/sq mi) and its population had increased by 11.8% over the previous 10-year period.

== General information ==
On 1 January 1902, the large Skodje Municipality was divided. The northern part became the new Vatne Municipality (population: 1,547) and the southern part remained as Skodje Municipality (population: 1,551).

During the 1960s, there were many municipal mergers across Norway due to the work of the Schei Committee. On 1 January 1965, Vatne Municipality was dissolved. The island of Dryna and the western part of the island of Midøya (population: 334) were merged with Sør-Aukra Municipality to create the new Midsund Municipality. The remainder of Vatne Municipality (population: 2,260) was incorporated into the neighboring Haram Municipality. (In 2020, Midsund Municipality became a part of Molde Municipality.)

=== Name ===
The municipality (originally the parish) is named after the old Vatne farm (Old Norse: Vatnar) since the first Vatne Church was built there. The name is the plural form of vatn which means "water" or "lake" since the farm is located next to a lake.

=== Churches ===
The Church of Norway had one parish (sokn) within Vatne Municipality. At the time of the municipal dissolution, it was part of the Skodje prestegjeld and the Nordre Sunnmøre prosti (deanery) in the Diocese of Bjørgvin.

Churches in Vatne Municipality
Parish (sokn)	Church name	Location of the church	Year built
Vatne	Vatne Church	Vatne	1868

== Geography ==
The municipality was located at the entrance to the Romsdalsfjorden. Sør-Aukra Municipality and Vestnes Municipality were to the east, Skodje Municipality was to the south, and Borgund Municipality and Haram Municipality were to the west. The highest point in the municipality was the 1,069-metre (3,507 ft) tall mountain Blåskjerdingen, on the border with Vestnes Municipality.

== Government ==
While it existed, Vatne Municipality was responsible for primary education (through 10th grade), outpatient health services, senior citizen services, welfare and other social services, zoning, economic development, and municipal roads and utilities. The municipality was governed by a municipal council of directly elected representatives. The mayor was indirectly elected by a vote of the municipal council. The municipality was under the jurisdiction of the Frostating Court of Appeal.

=== Municipal council ===
The municipal council (Heradsstyre) of Vatne Municipality was made up of 17 representatives that were elected to four-year terms. The tables below show the historical composition of the council by political party.

Vatne heradsstyre 1963–1964
Party name (in Nynorsk)	Number of representatives
Local List(s) (Lokale lister)	17
Total number of members:	17

Vatne heradsstyre 1959–1963
Party name (in Nynorsk)	Number of representatives
Local List(s) (Lokale lister)	17
Total number of members:	17

Vatne heradsstyre 1955–1959
Party name (in Nynorsk)	Number of representatives
Labour Party (Arbeidarpartiet)	2
Local List(s) (Lokale lister)	15
Total number of members:	17

Vatne heradsstyre 1951–1955
Party name (in Nynorsk)	Number of representatives
Labour Party (Arbeidarpartiet)	2
Local List(s) (Lokale lister)	14
Total number of members:	16

Vatne heradsstyre 1947–1951
Party name (in Nynorsk)	Number of representatives
Labour Party (Arbeidarpartiet)	1
Local List(s) (Lokale lister)	15
Total number of members:	16

Vatne heradsstyre 1945–1947
Party name (in Nynorsk)	Number of representatives
Labour Party (Arbeidarpartiet)	2
Local List(s) (Lokale lister)	14
Total number of members:	16

Vatne heradsstyre 1937–1941*
Party name (in Nynorsk)	Number of representatives
Labour Party (Arbeidarpartiet)	2
Local List(s) (Lokale lister)	10
Total number of members:	12
Note: Due to the German occupation of Norway during World War II, no elections were held for new municipal councils until after the war ended in 1945.

=== Mayors ===
The mayor (Nynorsk: ordførar) of Vatne Municipality was the political leader of the municipality and the chairperson of the municipal council. The following people have held this position:

- 1902–1910: Rasmus Christian Hagen
- 1911–1934: Bernt K. Fagerli
- 1935–1937: Ivar Sollid
- 1938–1939: Amund K. Fylling
- 1939–1942: Jon P. Slyngstad
- 1942–1945: Carl J. Haugen (NS)
- 1945–1947: Jon P. Slyngstad
- 1948–1951: Ludvik Krogsæter
- 1952–1955: Johannes Fanneløp
- 1956–1963: Øyvind Sæter
- 1963–1965: Mads Skaar

== See also ==
- List of former municipalities of Norway
