= Midsund =

Midsund may refer to:

- Midsund (village), a village in Molde Municipality in Møre og Romsdal county, Norway
- Midsund Municipality, a former municipality in Møre og Romsdal county, Norway
- Midsund IL, a sports club based in Molde Municipality in Møre og Romsdal county, Norway
