= Midøya =

Island in Møre og Romsdal, Norway

- Interactive map of Midøya

Geography
- Location: Møre og Romsdal, Norway
- Coordinates: 62.6721°N 6.5979°E
- Area: 13.9 km^{2} (5.4 sq mi)
- Length: 6.5 km (4.04 mi)
- Width: 3.7 km (2.3 mi)
- Highest elevation: 522 m (1713 ft)
- Highest point: Bløkallen

Administration
- Norway
- County: Møre og Romsdal
- Municipality: Molde Municipality

Midøya (sometimes nicknamed Mia) is an island in Molde Municipality in Møre og Romsdal county, Norway. The 13.6-square-kilometre (5.3 sq mi) island sits at the entrance to the Romsdalsfjorden between the islands of Dryna and Otrøya. The Midsund Bridge connects this island to the village of Midsund on the neighboring island of Otrøya.

== History ==
Prior to 1902, the island was divided between Skodje Municipality (southwestern half) and Aukra Municipality (northeastern half). In 1902, the part of the island belonging to Skodje Municipality was transferred to the new Vatne Municipality. In 1924, the part belonging to Aukra Municipality became part of the new Sør-Aukra Municipality. In 1965, the whole island became part of the new Midsund Municipality. In 2020, the island became part of Molde Municipality.

=== Name ===
The Old Norse form of the name was Miðja. The name is identical with the word miðja which means "in the middle". The island lies between the two other islands of Dryna and Otrøya - but it could also refer to the fact that the island was an important border mark between the district of Sunnmøre (and the Gulating assembly) and the district of Romsdal (and the Frostating assembly). It was mentioned as the dividing place in the historic Historia Norvegiae, and it continued to be the dividing line until 1965 when the dividing line was moved upon the creation of Midsund Municipality.

== See also ==
- List of islands of Norway
