= Olav Askvik =

Norwegian politician

Member of the Norwegian Parliament for Møre og Romsdal
- In office 1965–1969

Mayor of Molde Municipality
- In office 1970–1971

Personal details
- Born: 12 May 1915
- Died: 28 June 2011 (aged 96)
- Political party: Liberal

Olav Askvik (12 May 1915 – 28 June 2011) was a Norwegian politician for the Liberal Party.

He served as a deputy representative to the Norwegian Parliament from Møre og Romsdal during the term 1965–1969. On the local level Askvik was mayor of Molde Municipality from 1970 to 1971.
