= Midsund Bridge =

Bridge in Møre og Romsdal, Norway

Midsund Bridge Midsundbrua
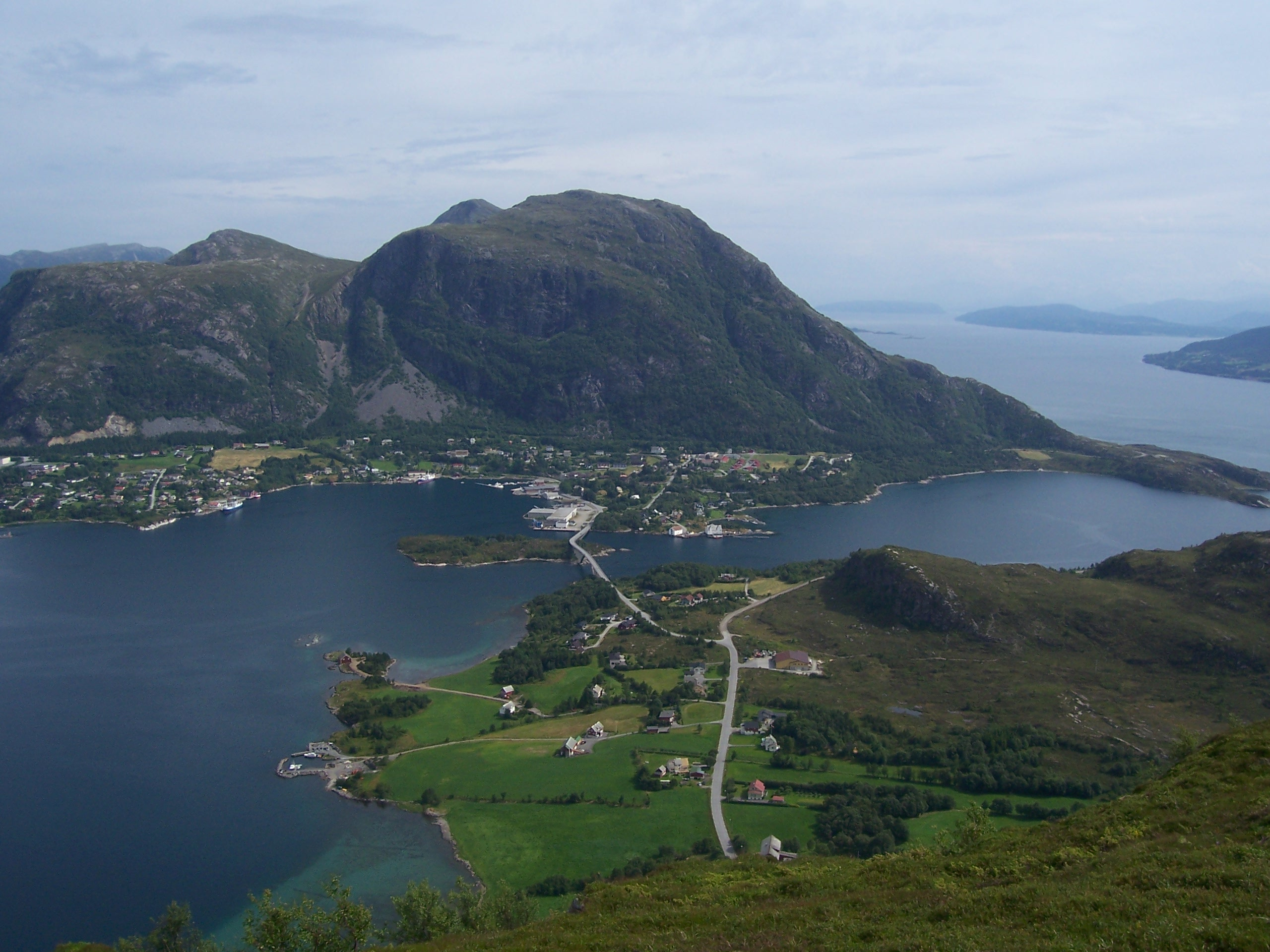
- View of the bridge
- Coordinates: 62.6728°N 06.6666°E
- Carries: Fv668
- Crosses: Midsundet
- Locale: Molde Municipality, Møre og Romsdal, Norway

Characteristics
- Design: Arch bridge
- Total length: 408 metres (1,339 ft)
- Longest span: 96 metres (315 ft)

History
- Construction cost: 3 million kr
- Opened: 28 June 1969

The Midsund Bridge (Norwegian: Midsundbrua) is a reinforced concrete arch bridge that crosses the Midsundet strait between the islands of Otrøya and Midøya in Molde Municipality, Møre og Romsdal county, Norway. The 408-metre-long (1,339 ft) bridge runs between the village of Midsund on Otrøya island to Leirvika on Midøya island. The bridge opened on 28 June 1969 and cost 2.8 million kr.

== See also ==
- List of bridges in Norway
- List of bridges in Norway by length
- List of bridges
- List of bridges by length
