= Nord-Heggdal =

Village in Molde Municipality, Norway

- Village
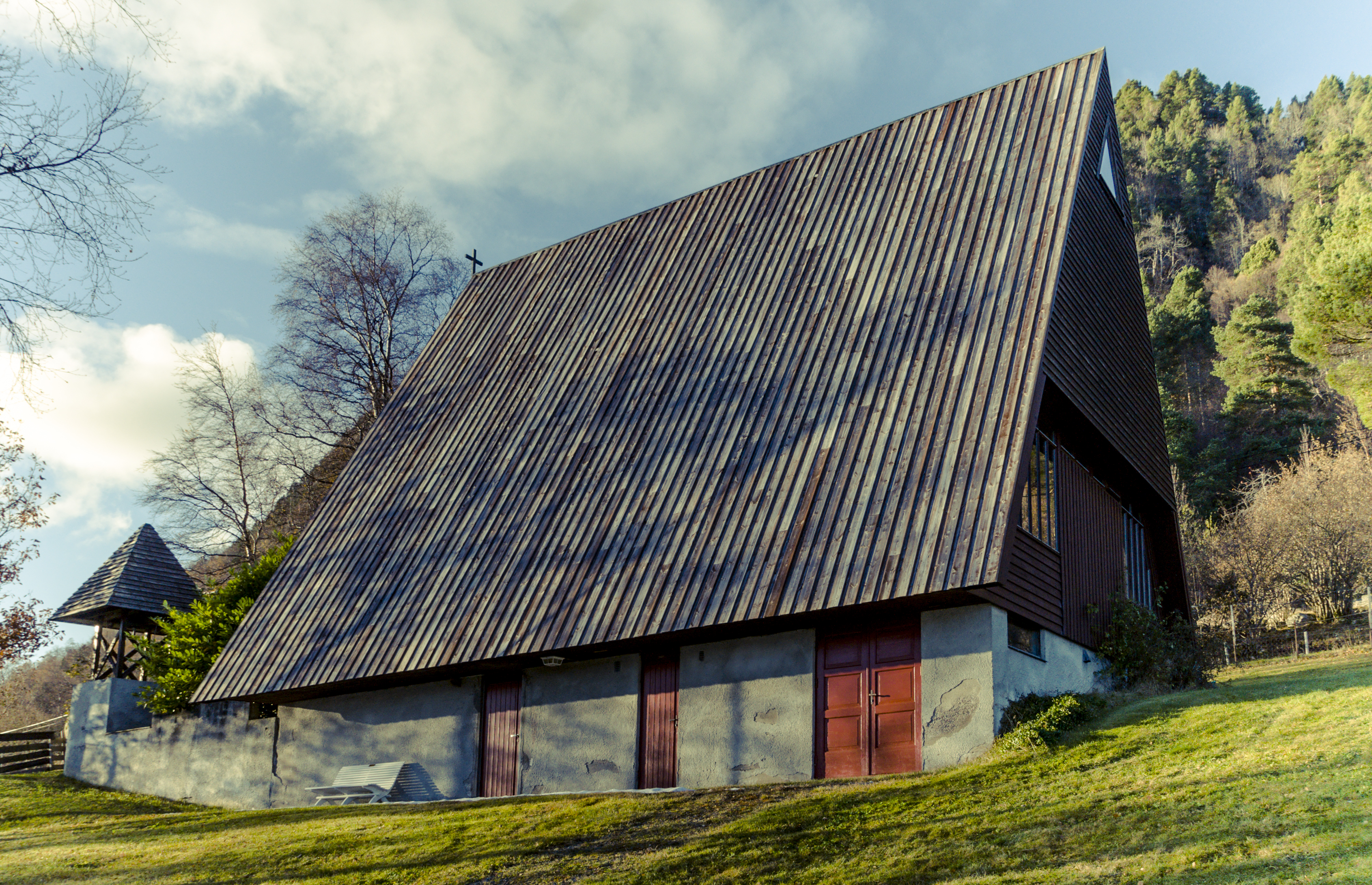
- View of the local chapel
- Interactive map of Nord-Heggdal
- Location within Møre og Romsdal Location within Norway
- Coordinates: 62.7042°N 6.9074°E
- Country: Norway
- Region: Western Norway
- County: Møre og Romsdal
- District: Romsdal
- Municipality: Molde Municipality
- Elevation: 41 m (135 ft)
- Time zone: UTC+01:00 (CET)
  - Summer (DST): UTC+02:00 (CEST)
- Post Code: 6475 Midsund

Nord-Heggdal is a village in Molde Municipality in Møre og Romsdal county, Norway. It is located about 15 kilometres (9.3 mi) southwest of the town of Molde on the south side of the island of Otrøya, along the vast Romsdal Fjord. The village of Midsund lies about 15 kilometres (9.3 mi) to the west of Nord-Heggdal. The Nord-Heggdal Chapel is located here.
