= Otrøy Church =

Church in Møre og Romsdal, Norway

- Otrøy kyrkje
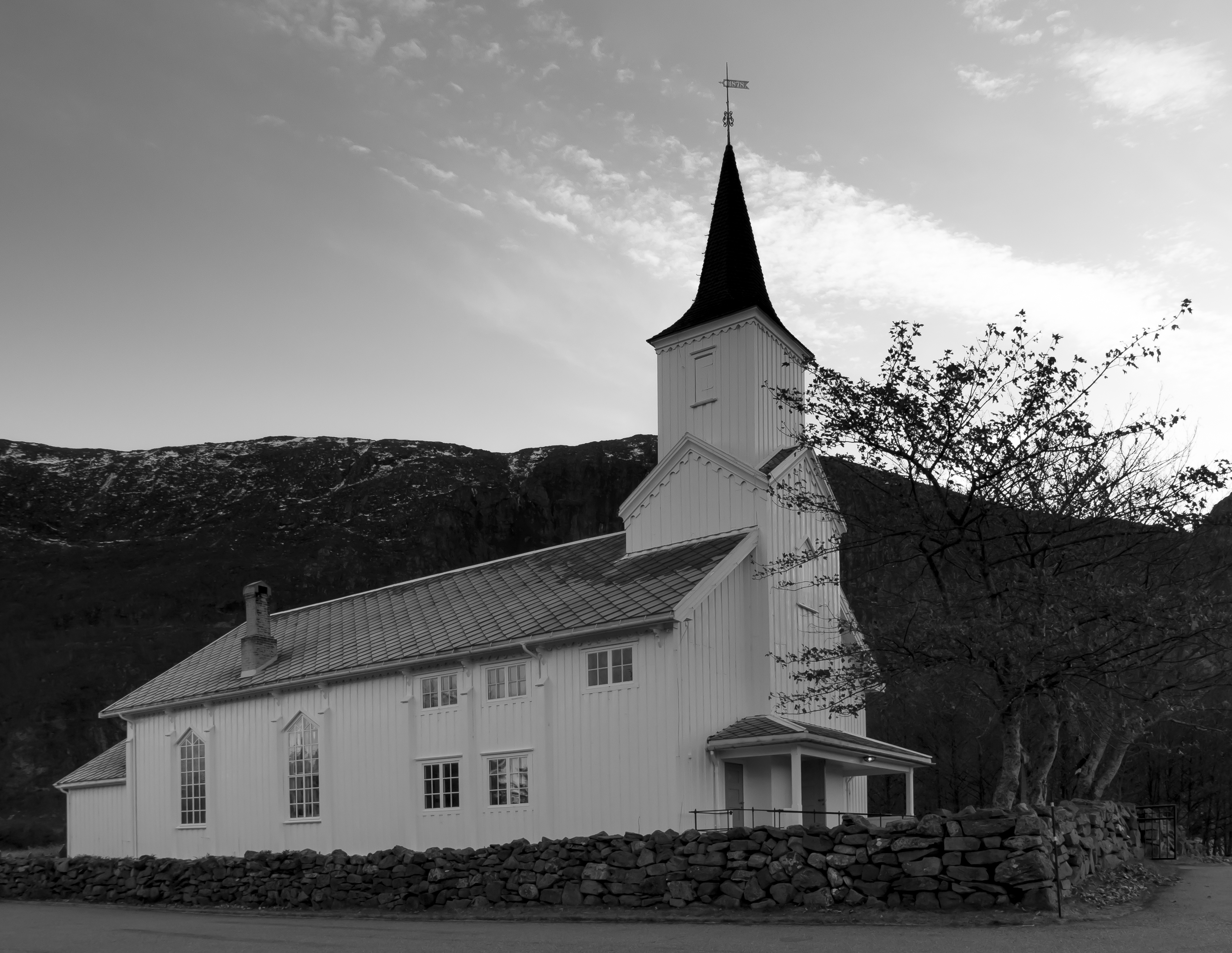
- View of the church Credit: Henny Stokseth
- Otrøy Church
- 62°41′59″N 6°42′21″E
- Location: Molde Municipality, Møre og Romsdal
- Country: Norway
- Denomination: Church of Norway
- Churchmanship: Evangelical Lutheran

History
- Former name: Sør-Aukra Church
- Status: Parish church
- Founded: 1878
- Consecrated: 1878

Architecture
- Functional status: Active
- Architect: Jacob Wilhelm Nordan
- Architectural type: Long church
- Completed: 1878 (148 years ago)

Specifications
- Capacity: 250
- Materials: Wood

Administration
- Diocese: Møre bispedømme
- Deanery: Molde domprosti
- Parish: Midsund
- Norwegian Cultural Heritage Site
- Type: Church
- Status: Not protected
- ID: 85252

Otrøy Church (Norwegian: Otrøy kyrkje; historic name: Sør-Aukra Church) is a parish church of the Church of Norway in Molde Municipality in Møre og Romsdal county, Norway. It is located in the village of Uglvik, about 2 kilometres (1.2 mi) northeast of the village of Midsund on the island of Otrøya. It is the main church for the Midsund parish which is part of the Molde domprosti (arch-deanery) in the Diocese of Møre. The white, wooden church was built in a long church design in 1878 using plans by the architect Jacob Wilhelm Nordan. The church seats about 250 people.

This was the main church of the old Sør-Aukra Municipality, and at that time it was called Sør-Aukra Church. After Sør-Aukra Municipality became part of Midsund Municipality, the church name was changed to the present name. In 1968, the church was enlarged.

== See also ==
- List of churches in Møre
