= Torgeir Dahl =

Norwegian politician (born 1953)

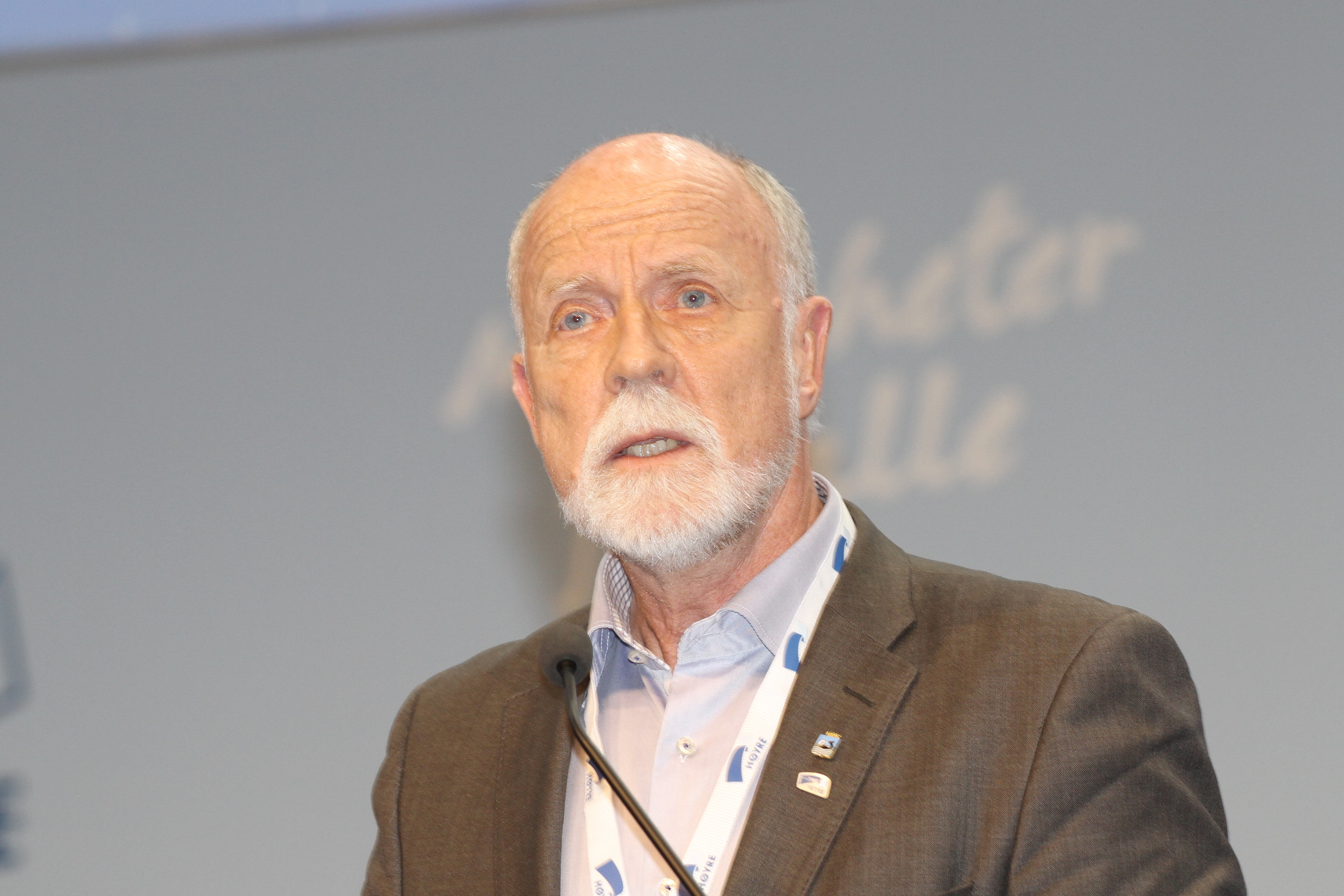
Torgeir Dahl

Torgeir Dahl (born 13 December 1953) is a Norwegian politician of the Conservative Party.

He served as a deputy representative to the Parliament of Norway from Møre og Romsdal during the term 2009–2013. He was the mayor of Molde Municipality from 2011 to 2023.
