= Moldefjord =

Fjord in Molde, Norway

Moldefjorden
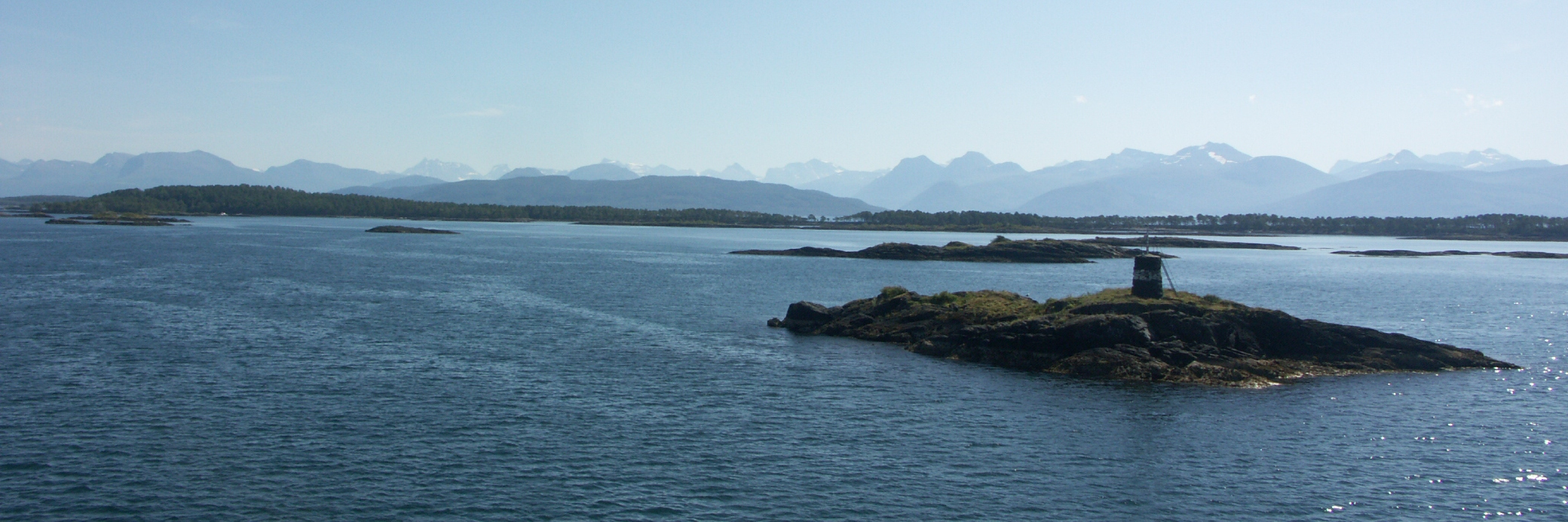
- View of the skerries in the fjord
- Interactive map of the fjord
- Location: Møre og Romsdal county, Norway
- Coordinates: 62.72833°N 7.10935°E
- Type: Fjord
- Basin countries: Norway
- Max. length: 20 kilometres (12 mi)
- Settlements: Molde

Moldefjorden is a fjord in Molde Municipality in Møre og Romsdal county, Norway. It is a 20-kilometre (12 mi) long branch off of the main Romsdal Fjord. The fjord begins at the Julsundet strait (in the west) and heads east, past the city of Molde, then it continues flowing east along the northern side of the Molde archipelago and the island of Bolsøya, and ending at the entrance to the Fannefjorden.

== See also ==
- List of Norwegian fjords
