= Nord-Heggdal Chapel =

Chapel in Møre og Romsdal, Norway

- Nord-Heggdal kapell
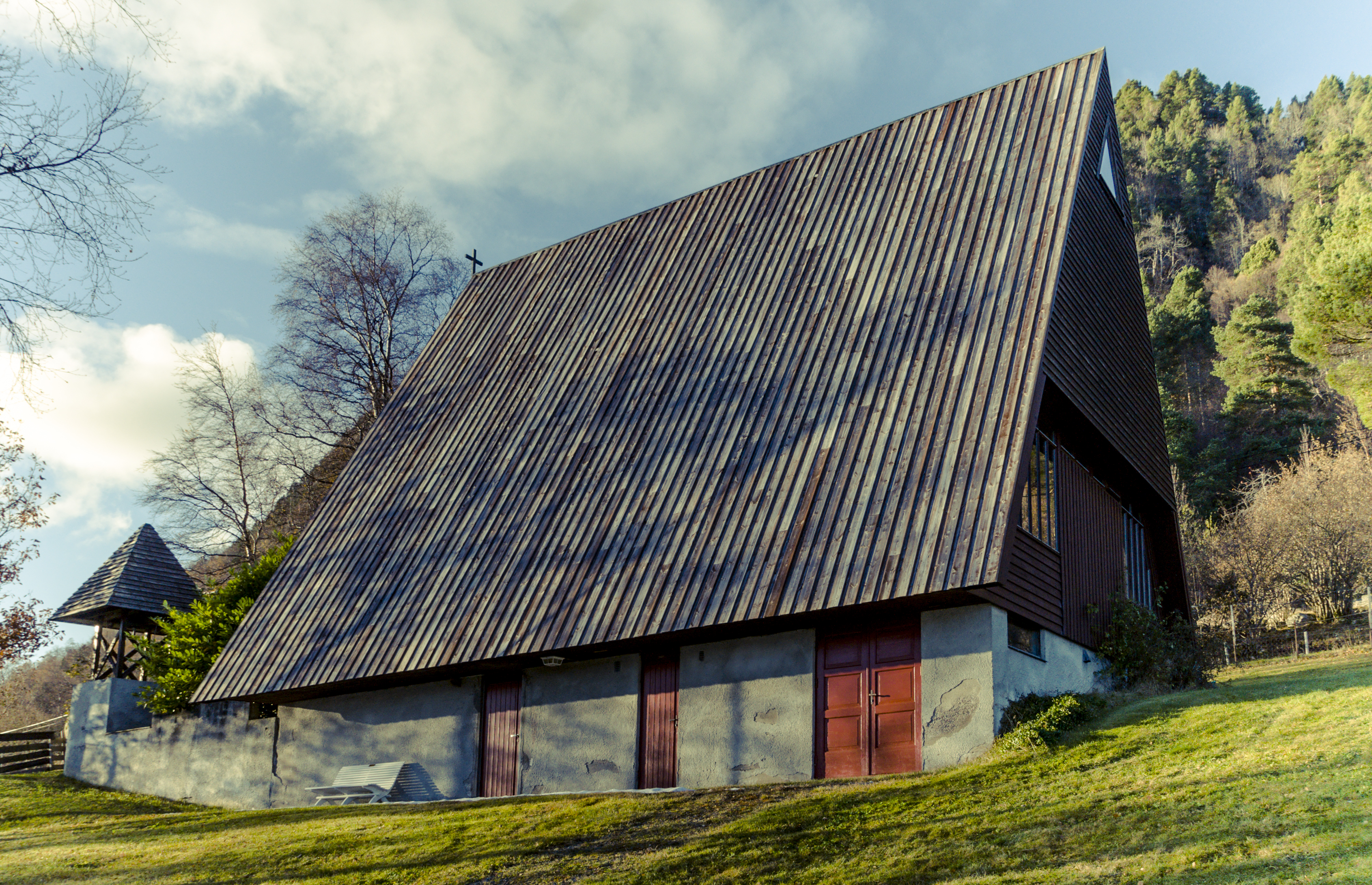
- View of the church
- Nord-Heggdal Chapel
- 62°42′03″N 6°54′04″E
- Location: Molde Municipality, Møre og Romsdal
- Country: Norway
- Denomination: Church of Norway
- Churchmanship: Evangelical Lutheran

History
- Status: Parish church
- Founded: 1974
- Consecrated: 1974

Architecture
- Functional status: Active
- Architect: Jostein Heggdal
- Architectural type: Rectangular
- Completed: 1974 (52 years ago)

Specifications
- Capacity: 100
- Materials: Wood

Administration
- Diocese: Møre bispedømme
- Deanery: Molde domprosti
- Parish: Midsund
- Norwegian Cultural Heritage Site
- Type: Church
- Status: Not protected
- ID: 85154

Nord-Heggdal Chapel (Norwegian: Nord-Heggdal kapell) is a parish church of the Church of Norway in Molde Municipality in Møre og Romsdal county, Norway. It is located in the village of Nord-Heggdal on the southeastern shore of the island of Otrøya. It an annex church for the Midsund parish which is part of the Molde domprosti (arch-deanery) in the Diocese of Møre. The brown, wooden church was built in a rectangular style in 1974 by the architect Jostein Heggdal. The church seats about 100 people.

== See also ==
- List of churches in Møre
