= Dryna =

Island in Møre og Romsdal, Norway

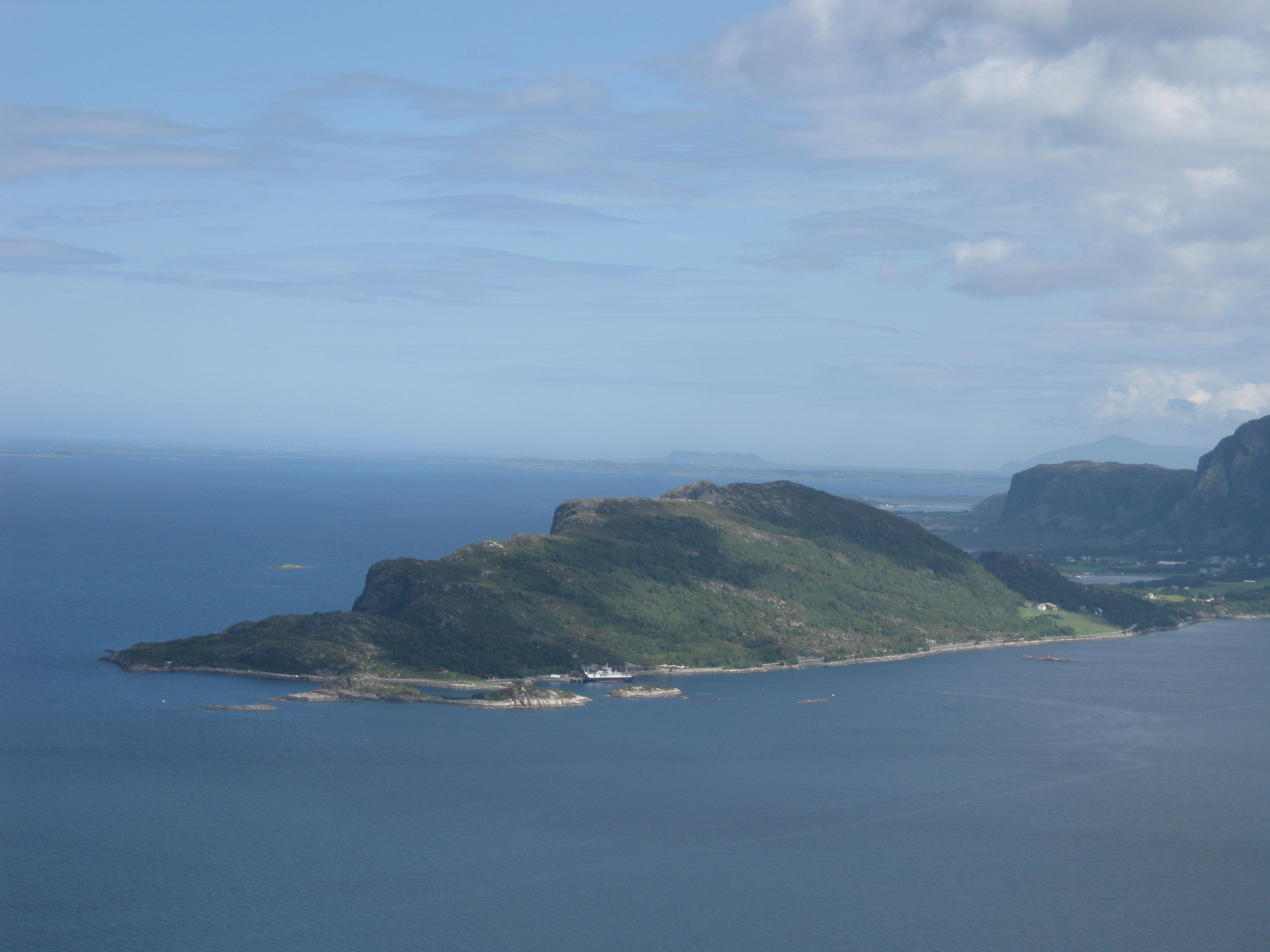
- Interactive map of Dryna

Geography
- Location: Møre og Romsdal, Norway
- Coordinates: 62.6454°N 6.5304°E
- Area: 1.7 km^{2} (0.66 sq mi)
- Length: 2.5 km (1.55 mi)
- Width: 1 km (0.6 mi)
- Coastline: 6 km (3.7 mi)
- Highest elevation: 200 m (700 ft)
- Highest point: Drynjahatten

Administration
- Norway
- County: Møre og Romsdal
- Municipality: Molde Municipality

Dryna is an island in Molde Municipality in Møre og Romsdal county, Norway. It is the westernmost of the main islands in the municipality. The 1.7-square-kilometre (0.66 sq mi) island sits between the Harøyfjorden and the Midfjorden, at the entrance to the great Romsdalsfjorden.

Dryna has a road connection to the neighboring island of Midøya to the east. There are ferry connections from the western end of the island to the village of Brattvåg (in Haram Municipality) and to the village of Myklebost (in Ålesund Municipality).

== History ==
Until 1965, Dryna was part of Haram Municipality. In 1965, it became part of Midsund Municipality. In 2020, it became part of Molde Municipality.

=== Name ===
The Old Norse form of the name was Dryn. The name is probably derived from the word drynr which means "rumble" or "roar" (referring to the swell of the waves against the island).

== See also ==
- List of islands of Norway
