= Rolf Myhre =

Norwegian politician

Rolf Myhre (born 31 October 1939, in Stokke Municipality) is a Norwegian politician for the Christian Democratic Party.

He has been the mayor of Molde Municipality three times, from 1984 to 1985, 1990 to 1993 and 1998 to 2003. He was also the chief administrator of the Norwegian Academy of Literature and Freedom of Expression.
