= Augustinius Neldal Lossius =

Norwegian politician

Augustinius Neldal Lossius (1 January 1787 – 15 July 1864) was a Norwegian jurist and politician.

He was elected to the Norwegian Parliament in 1818. He represented the constituency of Romsdals Amt, where he worked as a district stipendiary magistrate. He served only one term.
