= Otrøya =

Island in Møre og Romsdal, Norway

Otrøya Otrøy (historic)
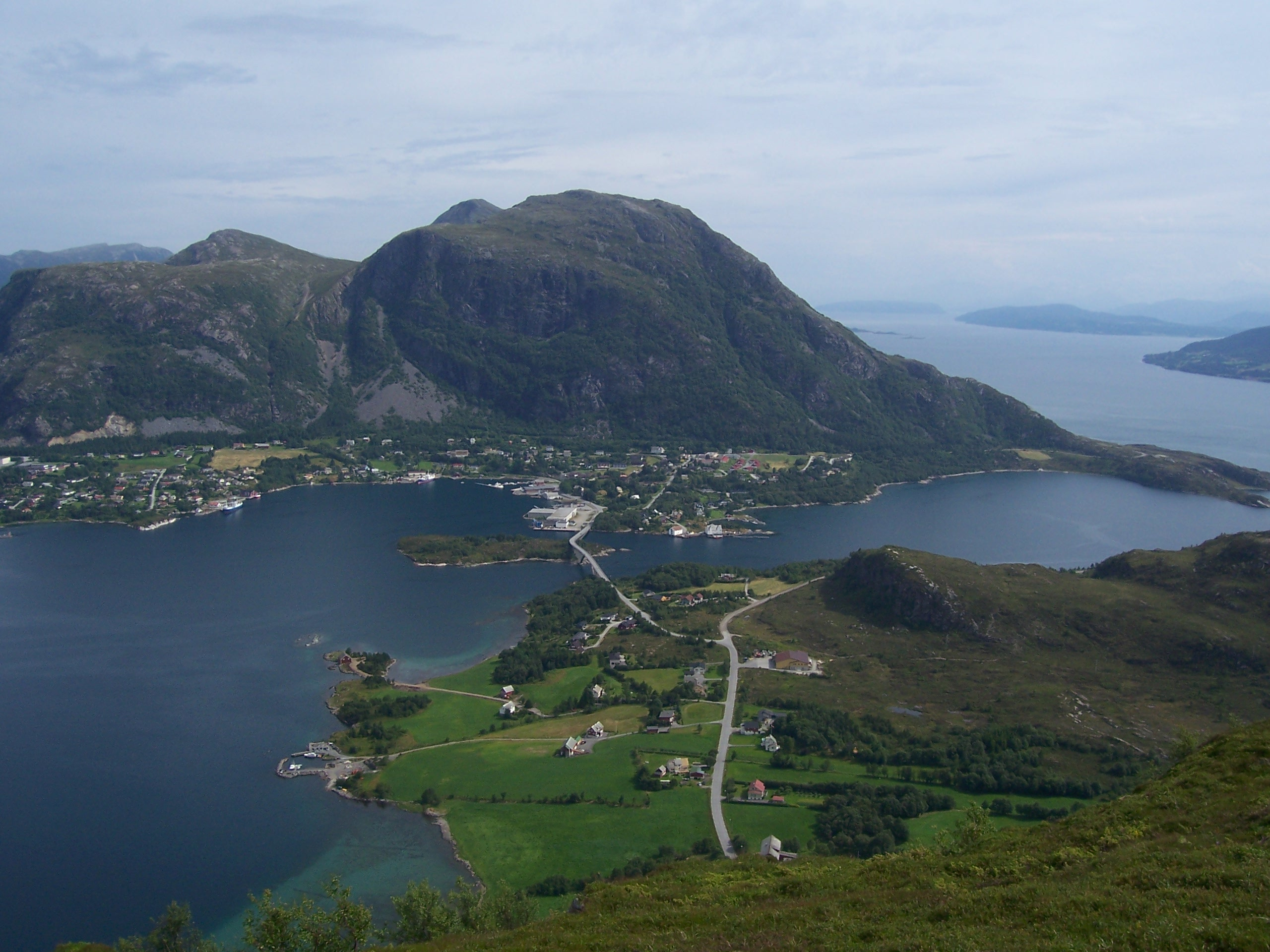
- View of Midsund village on Otrøya
- Interactive map of Otrøya; Otrøy (historic)

Geography
- Location: Møre og Romsdal, Norway
- Coordinates: 62°43′38″N 06°48′06″E
- Area: 75.5 km^{2} (29.2 sq mi)
- Length: 15.5 km (9.63 mi)
- Width: 7 km (4.3 mi)
- Coastline: 51 km (31.7 mi)
- Highest elevation: 737 m (2418 ft)
- Highest point: Oppstadhornet

Administration
- Norway
- County: Møre og Romsdal
- Municipality: Molde Municipality

Demographics
- Population: 1610 (2015)
- Pop. density: 21.3/km^{2} (55.2/sq mi)

Otrøya is the largest island in Molde Municipality in Møre og Romsdal county, Norway. The 75.5-square-kilometre (29.2 sq mi) island sits at the entrance to Romsdalsfjord, west of the island of Midøya and east of the mainland Romsdal peninsula.

The highest point on the island is the mountain Oppstadhornet at 737 metres (2,418 ft) above sea level. The main settlement is the village of Midsund on the west end of the island. Other settlements include Uglvik and Raknes on the north side of the island and Nord-Heggdal on the southeast side of the island. The Church of Norway has two churches on the island: Otrøy Church and Nord-Heggdal Chapel.

The Midsund Bridge connects Otrøya to the island of Midøya to the west. On the east end of the island, there is a ferry connection across the Julsundet strait to the village of Mordal in Molde Municipality.

== See also ==
- List of islands of Norway
