= Midsund (village) =

Village in Molde Municipality, Norway

- Village
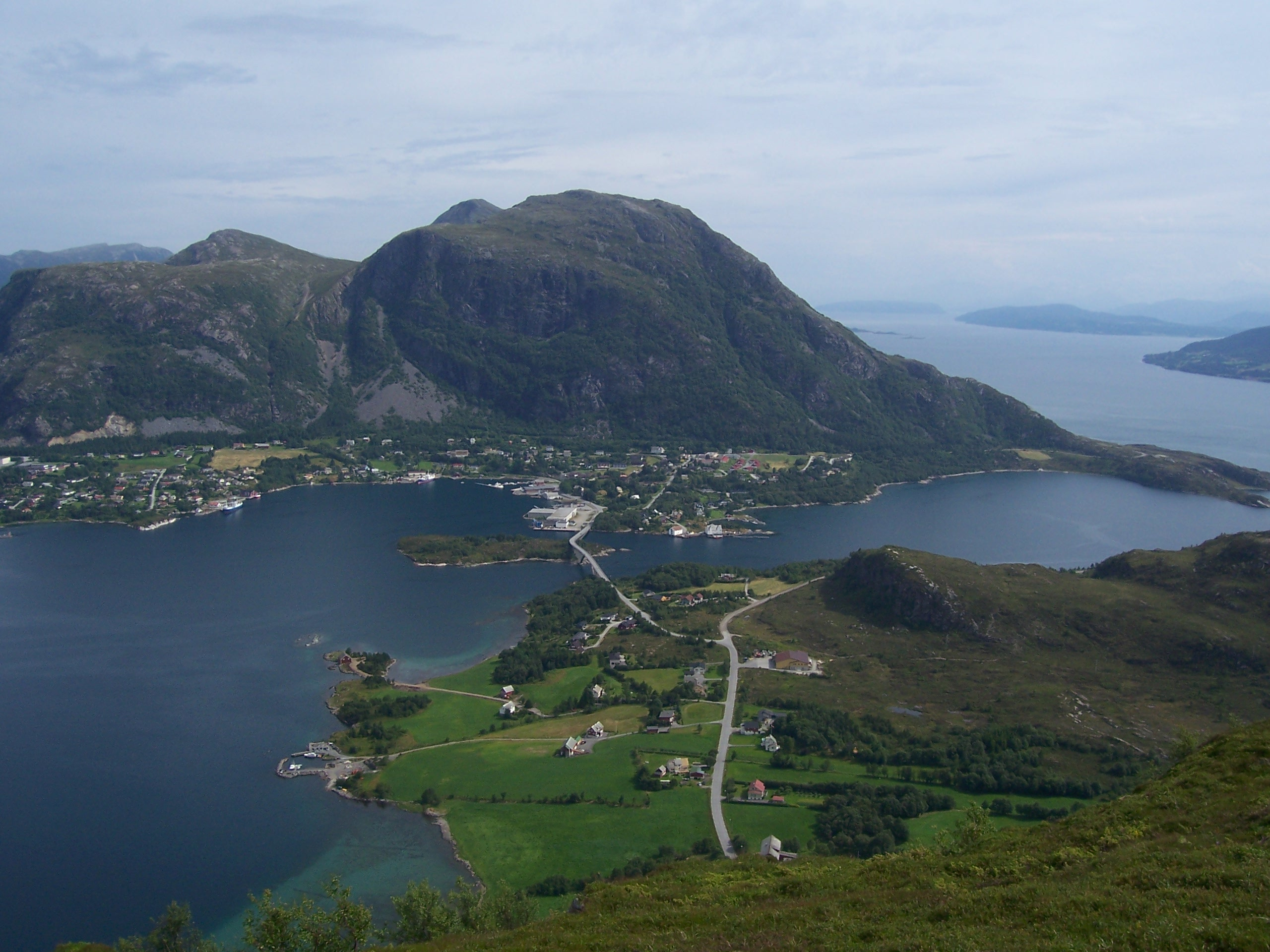
- View of the village and the Midsund Bridge
- Interactive map of Midsund
- Location within Møre og Romsdal Location within Norway
- Coordinates: 62.6739°N 6.6741°E
- Country: Norway
- Region: Western Norway
- County: Møre og Romsdal
- District: Romsdal
- Municipality: Molde Municipality

Area
  - Total: 0.7 km^{2} (0.27 sq mi)
- Elevation: 4 m (13 ft)

Population (2024)
  - Total: 590
  - Density: 843/km^{2} (2,180/sq mi)
- Time zone: UTC+01:00 (CET)
  - Summer (DST): UTC+02:00 (CEST)
- Post Code: 6475 Midsund

Midsund is a village in Molde Municipality in Møre og Romsdal county, Norway. The village is located on the western end of the island of Otrøya. The eastern end of the Midsund Bridge is located in the village of Midsund, connecting it to the neighboring island of Midøya to the west.

The 0.7-square-kilometre (170-acre) village has a population (2024) of 590 and a population density of 843 inhabitants per square kilometre (2,180/sq mi).

This village is the site of most private commercial services such as a grocery store, bank, shops, restaurant, and gas stations for the western part of Molde Municipality (the old Midsund Municipality). Otrøy Church lies about 3 kilometres (1.9 mi) northeast of the village of Midsund.

The village was the administrative center of the old Midsund Municipality until 2020 when it was merged into Molde Municipality.
