= Romsdalsfjord =

Fjord in Møre og Romsdal, Norway

Romsdalsfjorden
- Romsdal Fjord / Romsdalfjord
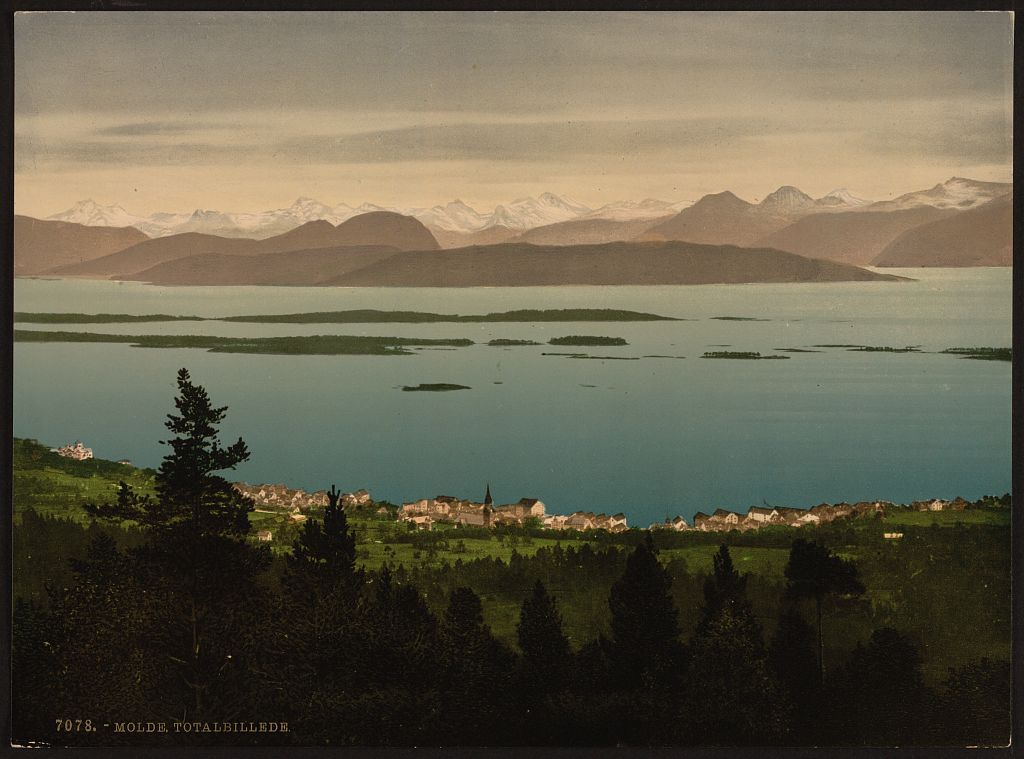
- View of the fjord near Molde
- Interactive map of the fjord
- Location: Møre og Romsdal county, Norway
- Coordinates: 62.6523°N 7.2615°E
- Type: Fjord
- Basin countries: Norway
- Max. length: 88 kilometres (55 mi)
- Settlements: Molde, Åndalsnes

Romsdalsfjorden (Norwegian) or Romsdal Fjord (English) is the ninth-longest fjord in Norway. The 88-kilometre (55 mi) long fjord is located in the Romsdal district of Møre og Romsdal county. It flows through the municipalities of Molde, Haram, Vestnes, and Rauma. The deepest point in the fjord is just southwest of the town of Molde, where it is 550 metres (1,800 ft) deep.

The fjord is a threshold-fjord, as it is separated from the ocean by a 180-metre (590 ft) deep shallower areas at the mouth. Several islands and skerries also shelter the wide central fjord from the Atlantic.

The western inlet of the fjord is generally considered to be between the island of Dryna (in Molde Municipality) and the village of Brattvåg (in Haram Municipality). A second inlet is to the north, through the Julsundet strait, bound by the island of Otrøya to the west and Molde Municipality to the east.

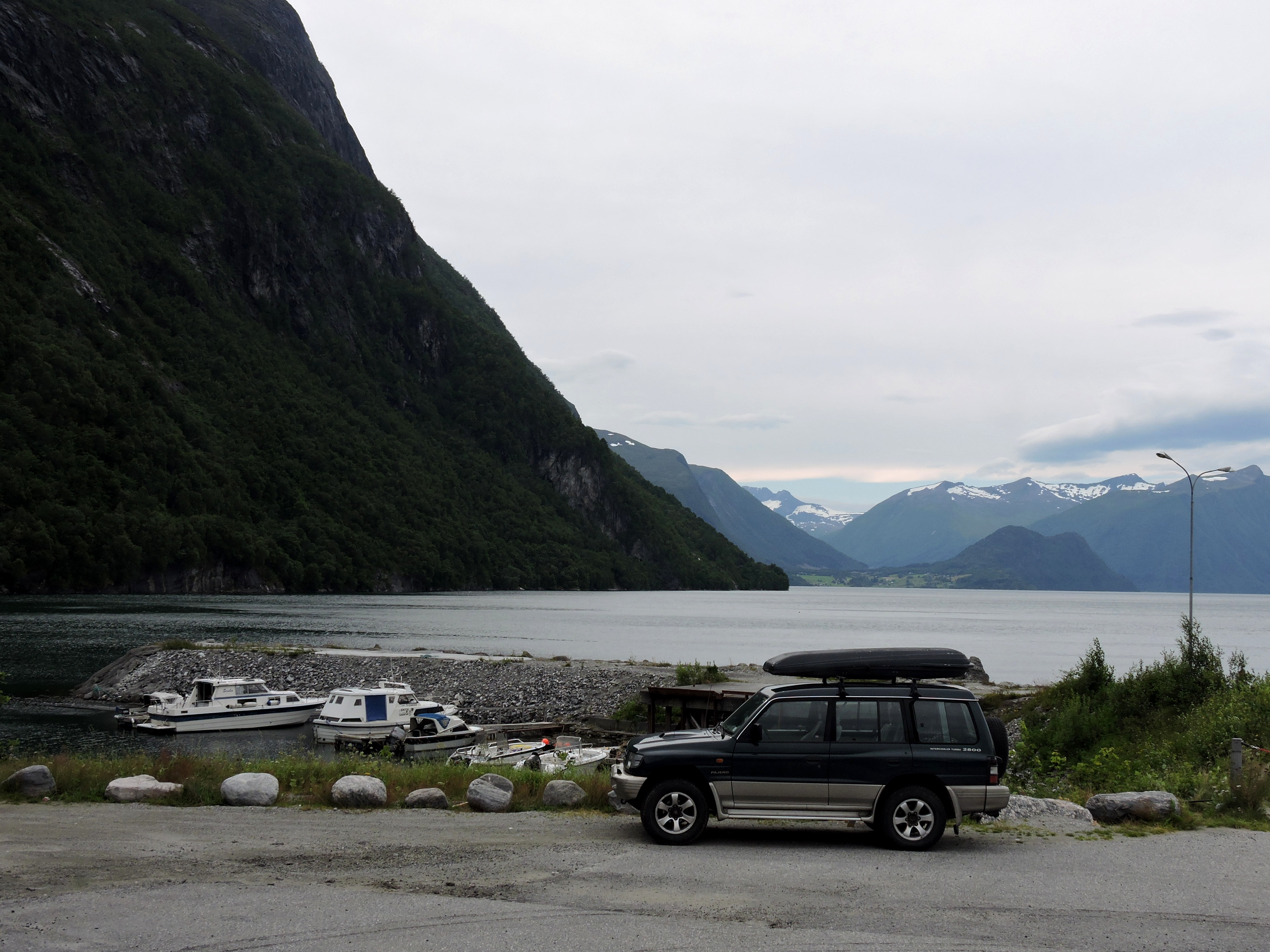
Romsdalsfjord, near Åndalsnes

The fjord branches off to the minor Tresfjorden and Tomrefjorden to the south, while the main body continues an east–west bound direction. The fjord then forks into three main branches: Moldefjorden (which flows into the Fannefjord) runs past the city of Molde north of the Molde Archipelago; Langfjorden, the longer arm of the fjord, with its branches Karlsøyfjorden, Rødvenfjorden, and the picturesque Eresfjorden, in the middle; and finally the southern arm past the town of Åndalsnes, terminating in Isfjorden.

From Eastern Norway, the fjord can be reached through the Gudbrandsdalen valley in Lesja Municipality, down the Romsdal valley to Åndalsnes. This is also the terminus of the Rauma Line.

Veøya—the holy island—is located at a junction between the three main branches of the fjord. This island was the foremost medieval trading center between Trondheim and Bergen. The Medieval Church of St. Peter (Old Veøy Church), from the late 12th century, is now a museum, but still hosts occasional services.

Wolf Larsen, the main character in Jack London's novel 'The Sea-Wolf' claims that he was born in the vicinity of Romsdalsfjord.

Major inflows of freshwater include the Rauma River and Eira River. Unlike many other fjords, Romsdalsfjord has several islands: Molde Archipelago, Otrøya, Midøya, Sekken, and Veøya. Salinity is slightly lower at the surface, just below 3%. Observations around 1930 showed salinity close to 3.5% and stable water temperatures just over 7 °C (45 °F) in the deep parts. Heavy, oxygen-rich water from Atlantic typically flow over threshold in April–June and sink to deepest part where old water is displaced. Along the fjord there are examples of hanging valleys, for instance Sjølbotn at Innfjorden. Post-glacial rebound has lifted the land around Romsdalsfjord up to 100 metres (330 ft) leaving previous subsea deposits of gravel and clay as wide terraces for instance in the valley mouths around Åndalsnes, Veblungsnes, Innfjorden, and Isfjorden.

== Transport ==
The Romsdalsfjorden was an important transport corridor before the highway that is now the European route E136 between Åndalsnes and Ålesund was completed in 1946. The town of Molde is connected to the south shore by large ferries to the dock in the village of Vestnes (village), this is the fifth busiest ferry crossing in Norway, several vessels run shuttles across the 11-kilometre (6.8 mi) wide fjord. The car ferry Sølsnes-Åfarnes has operated since 1931. There are no bridges across the main fjord, except the shorter Bolsøy Bridge (to Bolsøy island) and the Tresfjord Bridge across the small Tresfjord branch. Fannefjord Tunnel connects Molde to Bolsøya island. Until 1946, Åndalsnes and the terminus of the Rauma Line were connected to Molde and Ålesund by boat.

The first cruise ships carrying tourists arrived at Veblungsnes in 1880. The tourism industry boomed when the Rauma Line began operations in 1924 and Trollstigen road opened in 1936.

After the German invasion of Norway on April 9, 1940, Romsdalsfjorden was initially not controlled by German forces. UK forces arrived along Romsdalsfjord and landed at Åndalsnes, then retreated along the fjord two weeks later during heavy fighting.

There is a project to build a 16-kilometre-long (9.9 mi) undersea tunnel and a 2000-meter-long suspension bridge with a 1,650-meter-long (5,410 ft) span. Its construction is scheduled to begin around 2030.

== Tourism ==
Romsdalsfjord has increasingly become a destination for nature and fishing tourism. Activities include hiking, scenic cruises, and particularly sea fishing. Since the 1980s, organized fishing holidays for mainly German-speaking tourists have been offered in the region. One of the earliest companies to specialize in this niche was Onken Tours, a German travel operator recognized as a pioneer in fishing tourism in Norway and especially at the Romsdalsfjord.

== See also ==
- List of Norwegian fjords
