= Molde Municipality =

Municipality in Møre og Romsdal, Norway

Molde Municipality Molde kommune
- Municipality
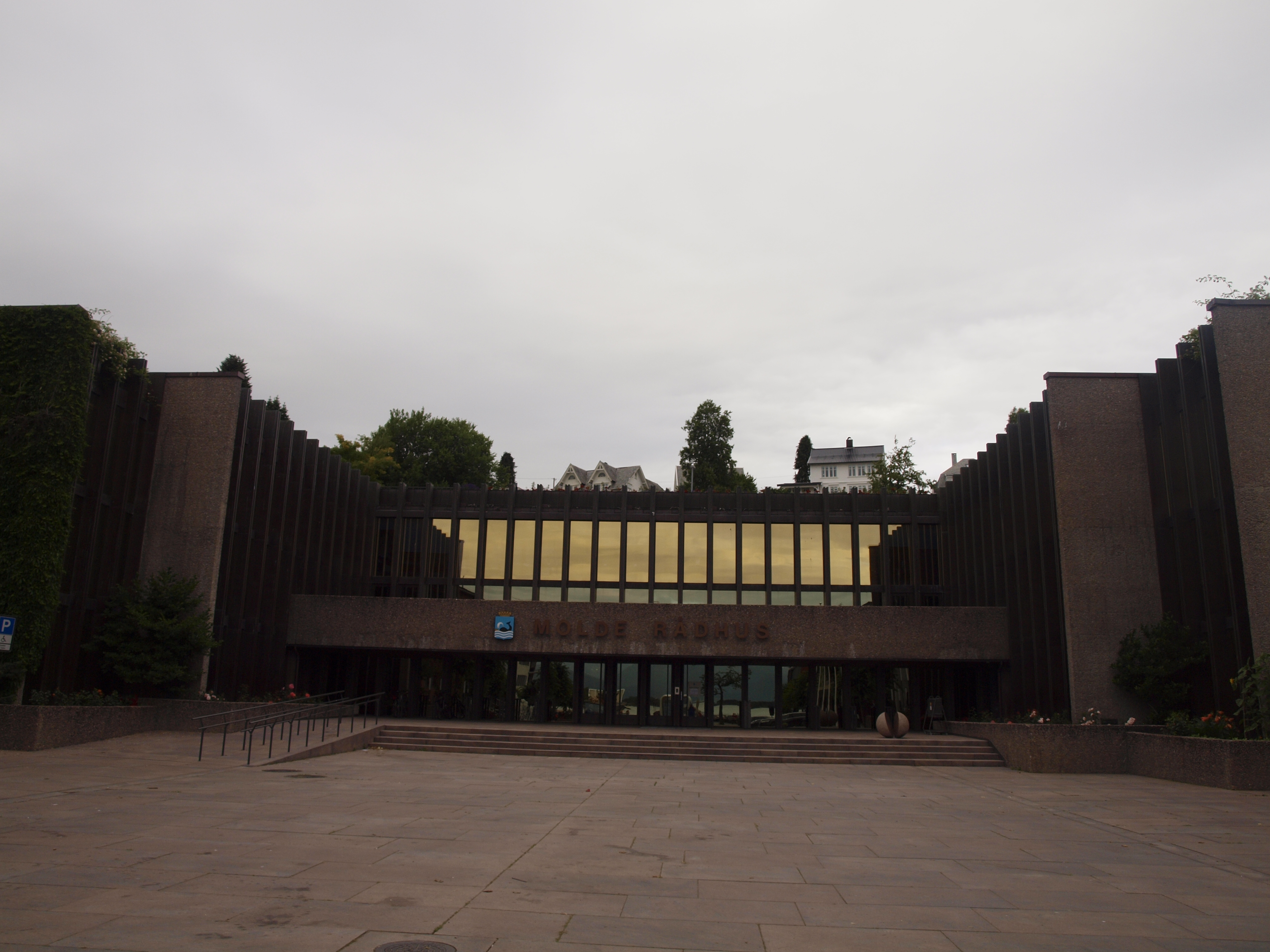
- Molde town hall

- Flag Coat of arms

- Møre og Romsdal within Norway

- Molde within Møre og Romsdal
- Coordinates: 62°45′23″N 07°14′19″E
- Country: Norway
- County: Møre og Romsdal
- District: Romsdal
- Established: 1 Jan 1838
  - Created as: Formannskapsdistrikt
- Administrative centre: Molde

Government
  - Mayor (2023): Trygve Grydeland (H)

Area
  - Total: 1,503.37 km^{2} (580.45 sq mi)
  - Land: 1,434.81 km^{2} (553.98 sq mi)
  - Water: 68.56 km^{2} (26.47 sq mi) 4.6%
  - Rank: #56 in Norway
- Highest elevation: 1,964.92 m (6,446.6 ft)

Population (2024)
  - Total: 32,816
  - Rank: #32 in Norway
  - Density: 21.8/km^{2} (56/sq mi)
  - Change (10 years): ▲ +5.6%
- Demonym(s): Moldenser; Moldensar

Official language
  - Norwegian form: Neutral
- Time zone: UTC+01:00 (CET)
  - Summer (DST): UTC+02:00 (CEST)
- ISO 3166 code: NO-1506
- Website: Official website

Molde Municipality (Norwegian pronunciation: [ˈmɔ̂ɫdə]) is a municipality in Møre og Romsdal county, Norway. It is located in the traditional district of Romsdal. It is located on the Romsdal Peninsula, surrounding the Fannefjord and Moldefjord. The administrative centre of the municipality is the city of Molde which is also the administrative centre of Møre og Romsdal county, the commercial hub of the Romsdal region, and the seat of the Diocese of Møre. Other main population centres in the municipality include the villages of Hjelset, Kleive, Nesjestranda, Midsund, Nord-Heggdal, Eidsvåg, Raudsand, Boggestranda, Myklebostad, Eresfjord, and Eikesdalen.

The 1,503-square-kilometre (580 sq mi) municipality is the 56th largest by area out of the 357 municipalities in Norway. Molde is the 32nd most populous municipality in Norway with a population of 32,816. The municipality's population density is 21.8 inhabitants per square kilometre (56/sq mi) and its population has increased by 5.6% over the previous 10-year period.

Molde has a maritime, temperate climate, with cool-to-warm summers, and relatively mild winters. The city of Molde is nicknamed The City of Roses. Molde is a centre for Norwegian textile and garment industry as well as a major tourist destination.

Molde was originally the name of a farm by a natural harbour, which grew into a timber trading port in the late 16th century. Formal trading rights were introduced before 1604, and the town was incorporated as a kjøpstad through a royal charter in 1742. The town of Molde was established as a municipality on 1 January 1838 (see formannskapsdistrikt law) and over the years, the municipality has grown significantly in area such that the municipality is now vastly larger than the urban city of Molde.

== History ==
The town of Molde was established as an urban municipality on 1 January 1838 (see formannskapsdistrikt law). It was surrounded by the rural Bolsøy Municipality. On 1 July 1915, a part of Bolsøy Municipality (population: 183) was transferred into the city of Molde. On 1 January 1952, another part of Bolsøy Municipality (population: 1,913) was transferred into the city of Molde.

During the 1960s, there were many municipal mergers across Norway due to the work of the Schei Committee. On 1 January 1964, the Molde (town) (population: 8,289) merged with the Sekken, Veøya, and Nesjestranda parts of Veøy Municipality (population: 756), all of Bolsøy Municipality (population: 7,996), and the Mordal area of Nord-Aukra Municipality (population: 77) to form a new, larger Molde Municipality.

On 1 January 2020, the neighbouring Midsund Municipality and Nesset Municipality merged with Molde to form a much larger Molde Municipality.

== Coat of arms ==
The coat of arms was granted on 29 June 1742. The informal blazon is "a water spouting whale, which drives a barrel in front of itself" (Norwegian: en vannsprutende hvalfisk, som driver en tønne for seg). The arms have a blue field (background) and the charge is a whale and barrel floating on the ocean waves. It also has a mural crown above the escutcheon since the municipality includes a town. The exact design of the coat of arms is not formally depicted in law, so it has varied some over the centuries. The arms symbolize a whale chasing herring into a barrel, based on an old myth that the whales (guided by God) chased the schools of herring into the fjords at certain times. It also portrays the city's founding industries of herring fisheries and timber exports. Molde was never a whaling port, but the unusually bountiful fisheries in the early 1740s alleviated the city's suffering during a major famine. The sighting of whales, usually pods of orca, was commonly held to be the start of the spring herring fisheries. The municipal flag is a white flag with the coat of arms in the centre.

Moldesangen (lit. 'The Song of Molde') is the semi-official anthem. It was written by Palle Godtfred Olaus Dørum (1818–1886) and composed by Karl Groos (1789–1861), supposedly in 1818, and is the same tune used the anthem of the German federal state Mecklenburg-Vorpommern.

== Geography ==
Molde Municipality includes part of the Romsdal peninsula as well as many islands including the islands of Otrøya and Midøya. To the southeast, Molde Municipality stretches about 75 kilometres (47 mi) inland. The town of Molde consists of a 10 kilometres (6.2 mi) long and 1 to 2 kilometres (0.62 to 1.24 mi) wide strip of urban land running east–west along the north shore of the Moldefjord, an arm of the Romsdalsfjord, on the Romsdal peninsula. The city is sheltered by Bolsøya and the Molde archipelago, a chain of low-lying islands and islets, to the south, and the wood-clad hills of Moldemarka to the north. The city centre is located just west of the river Moldeelva, which runs into the city from the north, originating in the Moldevatnet lake, through the valley Moldedalen. Despite the river being minor and seasonal, it supported several sawmills in the 16th and 17th centuries. This gave rise to the original town itself through a combination of a good harbour, proximity to the sea routes, vast timber resources, and a river capable of supporting mills. In 1909, the river housed the first hydro electric power plant capable of providing sufficient electricity for the city, and the upper reaches of the river still provide drinking water for most of the city.

The highest point in the municipality is the 1,964.92-metre (6,446.6 ft) tall mountain Kleneggen. Its panoramic view of some 222 partly snow-clad peaks, usually referred to as the Molde panorama, is one of Molde's main attractions, and has drawn tourists to the city since the 19th century. Molde is nicknamed the Town of Roses, a name which originated during Molde's era as a tourist destination of international fame in the late 19th century.

Neighbouring municipalities are Aukra, Gjemnes, and Hustadvika (to the north); Ålesund (to the southwest); Vestnes and Rauma (to the south); and Tingvoll and Sunndal (to the east).

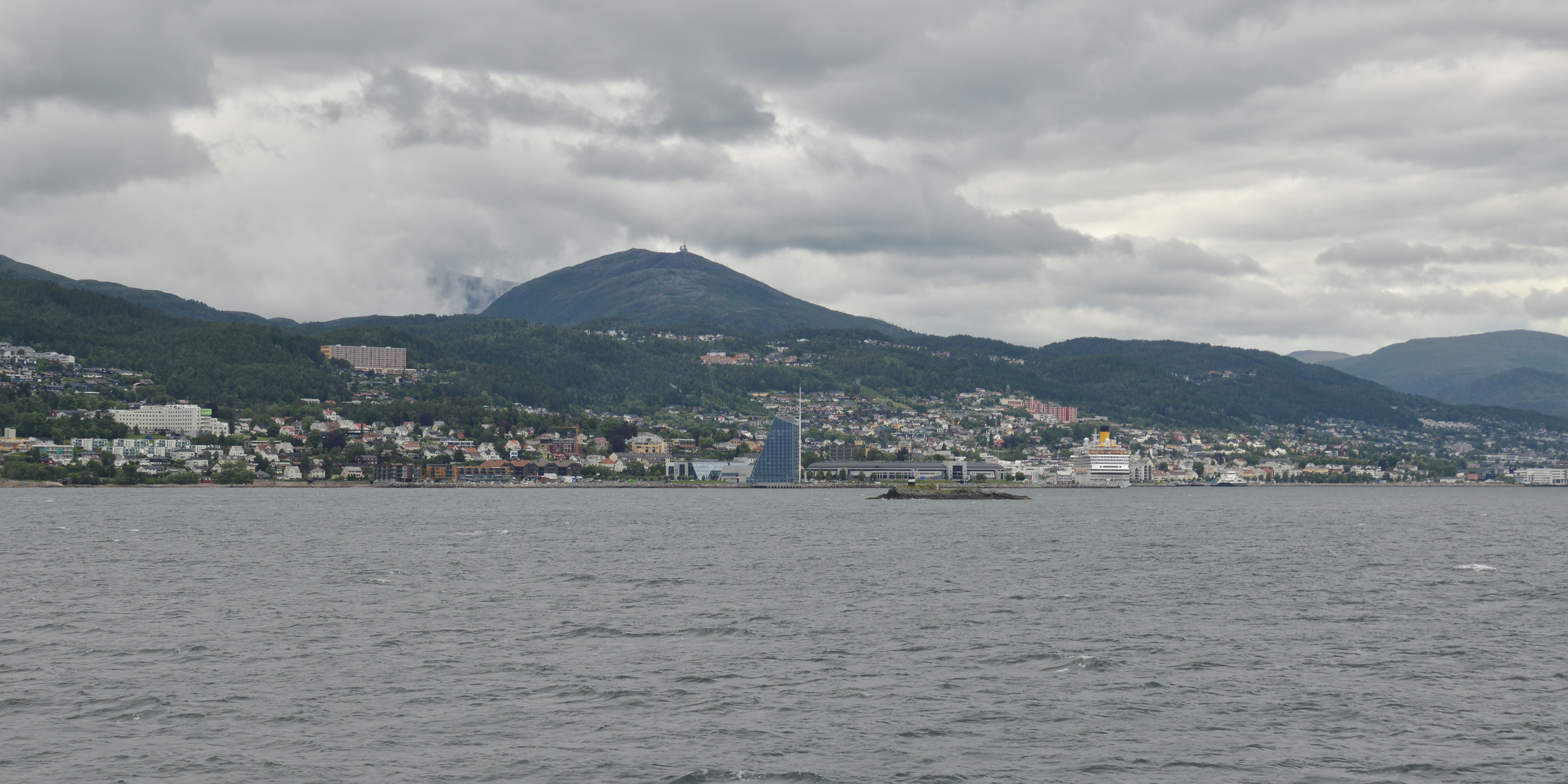
Panoramic view of Molde

== Government ==
Molde Municipality is responsible for primary education (through 10th grade), outpatient health services, senior citizen services, welfare and other social services, zoning, economic development, and municipal roads and utilities. The municipality is governed by a municipal council of directly elected representatives. The mayor is indirectly elected by a vote of the municipal council. The municipality is under the jurisdiction of the Nordmøre og Romsdal District Court and the Frostating Court of Appeal. Waste management has since 1983 been provided by the inter-municipal agency Romsdalshalvøya Interkommunale Renovasjonsselskap. Its main, regional recycling center is situated at Årødalen.

=== Municipal council ===
The municipal council (Kommunestyre) of Molde Municipality is made up of 49 representatives who are elected to four-year terms. The tables below show the current and historical composition of the council by political party.

Molde kommunestyre 2023–2027
Party name (in Norwegian)	Number of representatives
Labour Party (Arbeiderpartiet)	7
Progress Party (Fremskrittspartiet)	7
Green Party (Miljøpartiet De Grønne)	3
Conservative Party (Høyre)	15
Industry and Business Party (Industri‑ og Næringspartiet)	1
Christian Democratic Party (Kristelig Folkeparti)	3
Red Party (Rødt)	2
Centre Party (Senterpartiet)	4
Socialist Left Party (Sosialistisk Venstreparti)	5
Liberal Party (Venstre)	2
Total number of members:	49

Molde kommunestyre 2019–2023
Party name (in Norwegian)	Number of representatives
Labour Party (Arbeiderpartiet)	8
Progress Party (Fremskrittspartiet)	7
Green Party (Miljøpartiet De Grønne)	5
Conservative Party (Høyre)	15
Christian Democratic Party (Kristelig Folkeparti)	3
Red Party (Rødt)	1
Centre Party (Senterpartiet)	10
Socialist Left Party (Sosialistisk Venstreparti)	8
Liberal Party (Venstre)	2
Total number of members:	59

Molde kommunestyre 2015–2019
Party name (in Norwegian)	Number of representatives
Labour Party (Arbeiderpartiet)	8
Progress Party (Fremskrittspartiet)	4
Green Party (Miljøpartiet De Grønne)	2
Conservative Party (Høyre)	17
Christian Democratic Party (Kristelig Folkeparti)	3
Centre Party (Senterpartiet)	3
Socialist Left Party (Sosialistisk Venstreparti)	3
Liberal Party (Venstre)	3
Local List(s) (Lokale lister)	4
Total number of members:	47

Molde kommunestyre 2011–2015
Party name (in Norwegian)	Number of representatives
Labour Party (Arbeiderpartiet)	9
Progress Party (Fremskrittspartiet)	5
Conservative Party (Høyre)	17
Christian Democratic Party (Kristelig Folkeparti)	4
Centre Party (Senterpartiet)	3
Socialist Left Party (Sosialistisk Venstreparti)	3
Liberal Party (Venstre)	6
Total number of members:	47

Molde kommunestyre 2007–2011
Party name (in Norwegian)	Number of representatives
Labour Party (Arbeiderpartiet)	10
Progress Party (Fremskrittspartiet)	8
Conservative Party (Høyre)	13
Christian Democratic Party (Kristelig Folkeparti)	5
Centre Party (Senterpartiet)	4
Socialist Left Party (Sosialistisk Venstreparti)	4
Liberal Party (Venstre)	3
Total number of members:	47

Molde kommunestyre 2003–2007
Party name (in Norwegian)	Number of representatives
Labour Party (Arbeiderpartiet)	9
Progress Party (Fremskrittspartiet)	8
Conservative Party (Høyre)	15
Christian Democratic Party (Kristelig Folkeparti)	4
Centre Party (Senterpartiet)	3
Socialist Left Party (Sosialistisk Venstreparti)	6
Liberal Party (Venstre)	2
Total number of members:	47

Molde kommunestyre 1999–2003
Party name (in Norwegian)	Number of representatives
Labour Party (Arbeiderpartiet)	12
Conservative Party (Høyre)	11
Christian Democratic Party (Kristelig Folkeparti)	11
Red Electoral Alliance (Rød Valgallianse)	1
Centre Party (Senterpartiet)	4
Socialist Left Party (Sosialistisk Venstreparti)	6
Liberal Party (Venstre)	2
Total number of members:	47

Molde kommunestyre 1995–1999
Party name (in Norwegian)	Number of representatives
Labour Party (Arbeiderpartiet)	13
Progress Party (Fremskrittspartiet)	4
Conservative Party (Høyre)	10
Christian Democratic Party (Kristelig Folkeparti)	8
Centre Party (Senterpartiet)	6
Socialist Left Party (Sosialistisk Venstreparti)	4
Liberal Party (Venstre)	2
Total number of members:	47

Molde kommunestyre 1991–1995
Party name (in Norwegian)	Number of representatives
Labour Party (Arbeiderpartiet)	12
Progress Party (Fremskrittspartiet)	2
Conservative Party (Høyre)	9
Christian Democratic Party (Kristelig Folkeparti)	8
Red Electoral Alliance (Rød Valgallianse)	1
Centre Party (Senterpartiet)	6
Socialist Left Party (Sosialistisk Venstreparti)	7
Liberal Party (Venstre)	2
Total number of members:	47

Molde kommunestyre 1987–1991
Party name (in Norwegian)	Number of representatives
Labour Party (Arbeiderpartiet)	19
Progress Party (Fremskrittspartiet)	7
Conservative Party (Høyre)	13
Christian Democratic Party (Kristelig Folkeparti)	9
Red Electoral Alliance (Rød Valgallianse)	1
Centre Party (Senterpartiet)	4
Socialist Left Party (Sosialistisk Venstreparti)	5
Liberal Party (Venstre)	3
Total number of members:	61

Molde kommunestyre 1983–1987
Party name (in Norwegian)	Number of representatives
Labour Party (Arbeiderpartiet)	20
Progress Party (Fremskrittspartiet)	3
Conservative Party (Høyre)	14
Christian Democratic Party (Kristelig Folkeparti)	10
Red Electoral Alliance (Rød Valgallianse)	1
Centre Party (Senterpartiet)	5
Socialist Left Party (Sosialistisk Venstreparti)	4
Liberal Party (Venstre)	4
Total number of members:	61

Molde kommunestyre 1979–1983
Party name (in Norwegian)	Number of representatives
Labour Party (Arbeiderpartiet)	18
Conservative Party (Høyre)	17
Christian Democratic Party (Kristelig Folkeparti)	11
New People's Party (Nye Folkepartiet)	1
Red Electoral Alliance (Rød Valgallianse)	1
Centre Party (Senterpartiet)	5
Socialist Left Party (Sosialistisk Venstreparti)	3
Liberal Party (Venstre)	5
Total number of members:	61

Molde kommunestyre 1975–1979
Party name (in Norwegian)	Number of representatives
Labour Party (Arbeiderpartiet)	19
Anders Lange's Party (Anders Langes parti)	1
Conservative Party (Høyre)	9
Christian Democratic Party (Kristelig Folkeparti)	14
New People's Party (Nye Folkepartiet)	2
Centre Party (Senterpartiet)	10
Socialist Left Party (Sosialistisk Venstreparti)	3
Liberal Party (Venstre)	3
Total number of members:	61

Molde kommunestyre 1971–1975
Party name (in Norwegian)	Number of representatives
Labour Party (Arbeiderpartiet)	23
Conservative Party (Høyre)	8
Christian Democratic Party (Kristelig Folkeparti)	11
Centre Party (Senterpartiet)	8
Socialist People's Party (Sosialistisk Folkeparti)	3
Liberal Party (Venstre)	8
Total number of members:	61

Molde kommunestyre 1967–1971
Party name (in Norwegian)	Number of representatives
Labour Party (Arbeiderpartiet)	24
Conservative Party (Høyre)	9
Christian Democratic Party (Kristelig Folkeparti)	9
Centre Party (Senterpartiet)	7
Socialist People's Party (Sosialistisk Folkeparti)	3
Liberal Party (Venstre)	9
Total number of members:	61

Molde kommunestyre 1963–1967
Party name (in Norwegian)	Number of representatives
Labour Party (Arbeiderpartiet)	25
Conservative Party (Høyre)	11
Christian Democratic Party (Kristelig Folkeparti)	11
Centre Party (Senterpartiet)	6
Socialist People's Party (Sosialistisk Folkeparti)	1
Liberal Party (Venstre)	7
Total number of members:	61

Molde bystyre 1959–1963
Party name (in Norwegian)	Number of representatives
Labour Party (Arbeiderpartiet)	15
Conservative Party (Høyre)	8
Communist Party (Kommunistiske Parti)	1
Christian Democratic Party (Kristelig Folkeparti)	7
Liberal Party (Venstre)	6
Total number of members:	37

Molde bystyre 1955–1959
Party name (in Norwegian)	Number of representatives
Labour Party (Arbeiderpartiet)	14
Conservative Party (Høyre)	8
Communist Party (Kommunistiske Parti)	1
Christian Democratic Party (Kristelig Folkeparti)	7
Liberal Party (Venstre)	7
Total number of members:	37

Molde bystyre 1951–1955
Party name (in Norwegian)	Number of representatives
Labour Party (Arbeiderpartiet)	13
Conservative Party (Høyre)	7
Communist Party (Kommunistiske Parti)	1
Christian Democratic Party (Kristelig Folkeparti)	7
Liberal Party (Venstre)	8
Total number of members:	36

Molde bystyre 1947–1951
Party name (in Norwegian)	Number of representatives
Labour Party (Arbeiderpartiet)	8
Conservative Party (Høyre)	5
Communist Party (Kommunistiske Parti)	3
Christian Democratic Party (Kristelig Folkeparti)	5
Liberal Party (Venstre)	7
Total number of members:	28

Molde bystyre 1945–1947
Party name (in Norwegian)	Number of representatives
Labour Party (Arbeiderpartiet)	10
Communist Party (Kommunistiske Parti)	3
Christian Democratic Party (Kristelig Folkeparti)	4
Liberal Party (Venstre)	5
Joint List(s) of Non-Socialist Parties (Borgerlige Felleslister)	6
Total number of members:	28

Molde bystyre 1937–1941*
Party name (in Norwegian)	Number of representatives
Labour Party (Arbeiderpartiet)	10
Liberal Party (Venstre)	10
Joint List(s) of Non-Socialist Parties (Borgerlige Felleslister)	8
Total number of members:	28
Note: Due to the German occupation of Norway during World War II, no elections were held for new municipal councils until after the war ended in 1945.

Molde bystyre 1934–1937
Party name (in Norwegian)	Number of representatives
Labour Party (Arbeiderpartiet)	8
Communist Party (Kommunistiske Parti)	1
Liberal Party (Venstre)	9
Joint List(s) of Non-Socialist Parties (Borgerlige Felleslister)	10
Total number of members:	28

Molde bystyre 1931–1934
Party name (in Norwegian)	Number of representatives
Labour Party (Arbeiderpartiet)	9
Liberal Party (Venstre)	8
Joint List(s) of Non-Socialist Parties (Borgerlige Felleslister)	10
Local List(s) (Lokale lister)	1
Total number of members:	28

=== Mayors ===
The mayor (Norwegian: ordfører) of Molde Municipality is the political leader of the municipality and the chairperson of the municipal council. Here is a list of people who have held this position:

- 1838–1838: C.B. Brinchmann
- 1839–1839: J.S. Sommerschield
- 1840–1840: C.B. Brinchmann
- 1841–1841: Bastian Width
- 1842–1842: Edvard Kraft
- 1843–1844: K.A. Bjørseth
- 1845–1845: Claus S. Jervell
- 1846–1846: K.A. Bjørseth
- 1847–1847: Johan Olivarius Horn
- 1848–1848: Claus S. Jervell
- 1849–1850: Johan Olivarius Horn
- 1851–1853: Isach Georg Dass
- 1854–1854: Christen Smith
- 1855–1855: Johan Olivarius Horn
- 1856–1856: Claus S. Jervell
- 1857–1857: Johan Olivarius Horn
- 1858–1858: Gunder Paulsen
- 1859–1859: Andreas Lind
- 1860–1860: Gunder Paulsen
- 1861–1861: Andreas Lind
- 1862–1862: Henrik L. Sommerschield
- 1863–1864: Thorvald Johannes Owren
- 1865–1865: Isach Georg Dass
- 1866–1866: Ludvig Arnoldus Leth
- 1867–1867: Gunder Paulsen
- 1868–1869: Ludvig Arnoldus Leth
- 1870–1870: Fredrik Christian Sand
- 1871–1874: K.F. Feilberg
- 1875–1876: Ferdinand Nicolai Roll
- 1877–1877: Henrik L. Sommerschield
- 1878–1878: Johan B. Ræstad
- 1879–1883: Tobias Annæus Owren
- 1884–1886: Ludvig Arnoldus Leth
- 1887–1888: Ferdinand Nicolai Roll
- 1888–1890: J.L.W. Dietrichson
- 1891–1891: Ludvig Arnoldus Leth
- 1892–1892: J.L.W. Dietrichson
- 1893–1893: O. Berg
- 1894–1895: J.L.W. Dietrichson
- 1896–1899: Albert Dessen
- 1900–1902: Lars Nøsen
- 1903–1904: Birger Stuevold-Hansen
- 1905–1907: Ulrich Møller
- 1908–1910: Nils Christian Egede Hertzberg
- 1911–1913: Lars Jacobsen
- 1914–1916: Nils Christian Egede Hertzberg
- 1917–1922: Anton Holm
- 1923–1925: Kristian Nøsen
- 1926–1927: Nils B. Elvsaas (V)
- 1928–1930: Hans Jakob Sparre Schneider
- 1931–1934: Ole Sivertsen Nås (V)
- 1935–1937: Oscar Hanssen (H)
- 1938–1940: Ole Sivertsen Nås (V)
- 1941–1945: Hans Jakob Sparre Schneider (NS)
- 1945–1945: Ole Sivertsen Nås (V)
- 1946–1946: Nils B. Elvsaas (V)
- 1947–1947: O. Aasgård (Ap)
- 1948–1950: Nils B. Elvsaas (V)
- 1951–1955: Asgaut Bore (V)
- 1956–1959: Kåre Stokkeland (Ap)
- 1960–1961: Petter Pettersson (H)
- 1962–1965: Johan Skipnes (KrF)
- 1966–1969: Petter Pettersson (H)
- 1970–1971: Olav Askvik (V)
- 1972–1973: Johan Skipnes (KrF)
- 1972–1973: Petter Pettersson (H)
- 1974–1977: Wilhelm Wilkens (Sp)
- 1978–1979: Asmund Fredly (KrF)
- 1980–1981: Bernt Vilnes (H)
- 1982–1983: Asmund Fredly (KrF)
- 1984–1985: Rolf Myhre (KrF)
- 1986–1989: Ragnar Heggdal (H)
- 1990–1993: Rolf Myhre (KrF)
- 1994–1998: Einar Øveraas (H)
- 1998–2003: Rolf Myhre (KrF)
- 2003–2011: Jan Petter Hammerø (H)
- 2011–2023: Torgeir Dahl (H)
- 2023–present: Trygve Grydeland (H)

== Twin towns – sister cities ==
Molde has three sister cities. They are:

- Borås, Sweden
- Mikkeli, Finland
- Vejle, Denmark
