= Møre og Romsdal =

County in Western Norway

Møre og Romsdal County Møre og Romsdal fylke
- County
- Møre fylke (historic name); Romsdals amt (historic name)
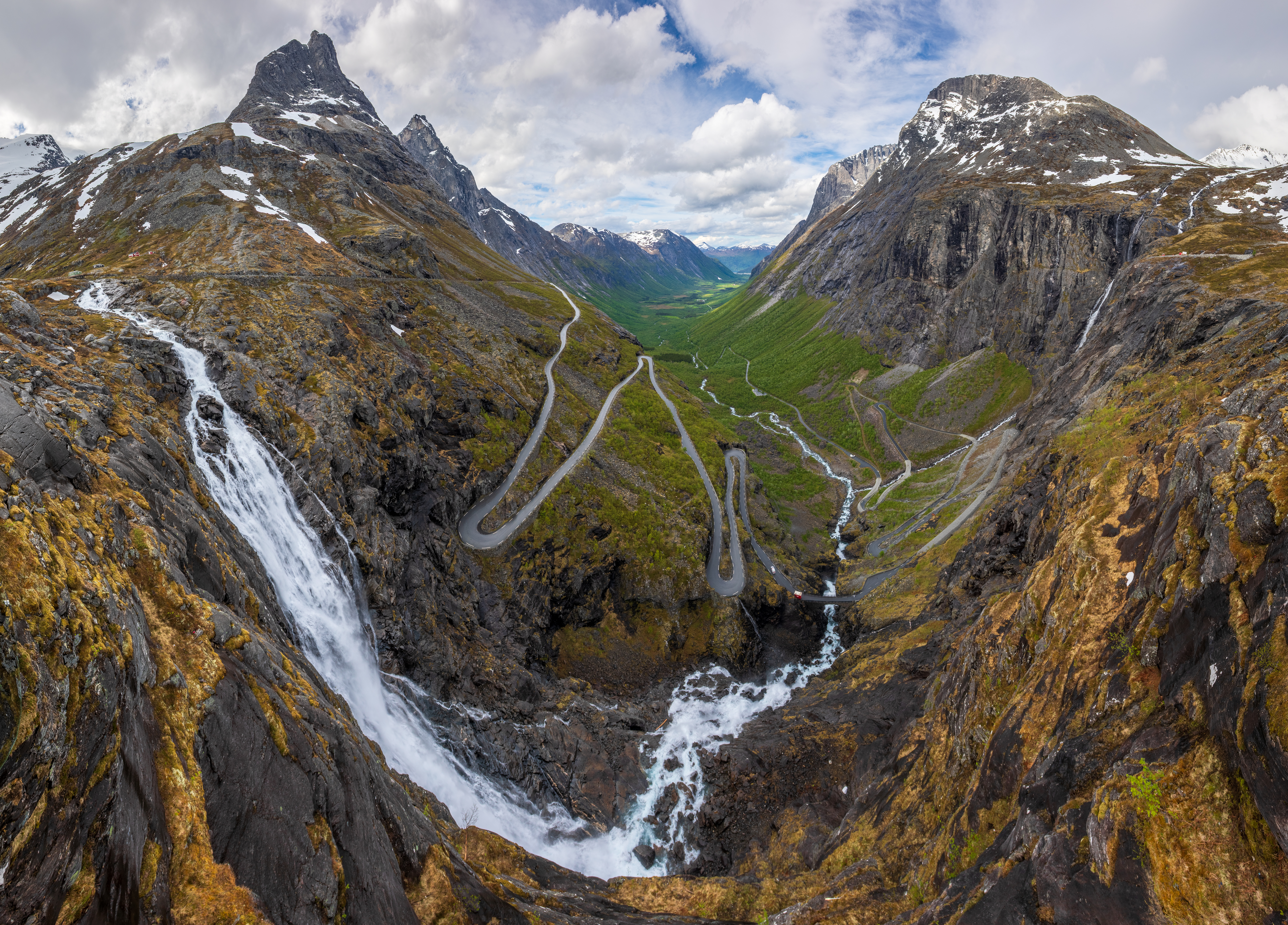
- Isterdalen in Romsdalen

- Flag Coat of arms

- Møre og Romsdal within Norway
- Coordinates: 62°44′15″N 07°09′30″E
- Country: Norway
- County: Møre og Romsdal
- District: Western Norway
- Established: 1671
- Administrative centre: Molde

Government
  - Body: Møre og Romsdal County Municipality
  - Governor (2022): Else-May Norderhus (Ap)
  - County mayor (2023): Anders Riise (H)

Area
  - Total: 14,356 km^{2} (5,543 sq mi)
  - Land: 13,840 km^{2} (5,340 sq mi)
  - Water: 516 km^{2} (199 sq mi) 3.6%
  - Rank: #9 in Norway

Population (2021)
  - Total: 265,544
  - Rank: #9 in Norway
  - Density: 19.2/km^{2} (50/sq mi)
  - Change (10 years): ▲ +5.6%
- Demonym(s): Sunnmøringer, Nordmøringer, and Romsdalinger

Official language
  - Norwegian form: Nynorsk
- Time zone: UTC+01:00 (CET)
  - Summer (DST): UTC+02:00 (CEST)
- ISO 3166 code: NO-15
- Income (per capita): 139,200 kr (2001)
- GDP (per capita): 243,412 kr (2001)
- GDP national rank: #6 in Norway (3.89% of country)
- Website: Official website

Møre og Romsdal (Urban East Norwegian: [ˈmø̂ːrə ɔ ˈrʊ̀msdɑːɫ]; English: Møre and Romsdal) is a county in the northernmost part of Western Norway. It borders the counties of Trøndelag, Innlandet, and Vestland. The county administration is located in the town of Molde, while Ålesund is the largest town. The county is governed by the Møre og Romsdal County Municipality which includes an elected county council and a county mayor. The national government is represented by the county governor.

== Name ==
Map of the three districts in the county. Green is Sunnmøre, purple is Romsdal, and blue is Nordmøre.

The name Møre og Romsdal was created in 1936. The first element refers to the districts of Nordmøre and Sunnmøre, and the last element refers to Romsdal. Until 1919, the county was called "Romsdalens amt", and from 1919 to 1935 "Møre fylke".

For hundreds of years (1660-1919), the region was called Romsdalen amt, after the Romsdalen valley in the present-day Rauma Municipality. The Old Norse form of the name was Raumsdalr. The first element is the genitive case of the name Raumr derived from the name of the river Rauma, i.e. "The Dale of Rauma". Raumr may refer to stream or current, or to booming or thundering waterfalls like Sletta waterfall. A purely legendary approach to the name refers to Raum the Old, one of the sons of Nór, the eponymous Saga King of Norway. Since the majority of the residents of the county lived in the Sunnmøre region, there was some controversy over the name. In 1919, many of the old county names were changed and this county was renamed Møre fylke.

The name Møre was chosen to represent the region where the majority of the county residents lived. That name is dative of Old Norse: Mǿrr (á Mǿri) and it is probably derived from the word marr referring to something wet like bog (common along the outer coast) or the sea itself. The name is interpreted as "coastland" or "bogland". Møre was originally the name of the coastal area from Stad and north including most of Fosen. (There is also a coastal district in Sweden that has the same name: Möre.) The change in name from Romsdalen to Møre was controversial and it did not sit well with the residents of the Romsdal region. Finally in 1936, the name was changed again to a compromise name: Møre og Romsdal (English: Møre and Romsdal).

The ambiguous designation møring— "person from Møre"— is used strictly about people from Nordmøre (and less frequently for people from Sunnmøre), excluding the people from Romsdal (while, consequently, romsdaling— "person from Romsdal"— is used about the latter).

== Coat of arms ==
The coat of arms was granted on 15 March 1978. It shows three gold-colored Viking ships on a blue background. Shipping and shipbuilding were historically very important to the region, so boats were chosen as the symbol of the arms. The masts on the Viking ships form crosses, which symbolize the strong Christian and religious beliefs as well as the strong religious organisations in the county. There are three boats to represent the three districts of the county: Sunnmøre, Romsdal and Nordmøre.

== Geography ==
Traditionally, the county has been divided into three districts. From north to south, these are Nordmøre, Romsdal, and Sunnmøre. Although the districts do not have separate governments and despite modern road, sea, and air connections throughout the county, the three districts still have their own identities in many ways. Historically speaking, connections have been stronger between Nordmøre and Sør-Trøndelag to the north, Romsdal and Oppland to the east, and Sunnmøre and Sogn og Fjordane to the south, than internally. Differences in dialects between the three districts bear clear evidence of this. Due to geographical features, the county has many populated islands and is intersected by several deep fjords. Due to its difficult terrain, Møre og Romsdal has been very dependent on boat traffic, and its main car ferry company, MRF, has existed since 1921.

=== Settlements ===
Møre og Romsdal has six settlements with town status. The largest three (Ålesund, Kristiansund, and Molde) were towns long before 1993 when municipalities were given the legal authority to grant town status rather than just the King (and government). This change in law led to an increase in the number of towns (Fosnavåg, Åndalsnes, and Ulsteinvik were all added after this time). The county contains many other urban settlements (as defined by Statistics Norway) without town status, every municipality except for Smøla Municipality contains at least one. As of 1 January 2018, there were 192,331 people (about 72 percent of the population) living in densely populated areas in the county while only 73,946 people lived in sparsely populated areas. The population density is highest near the coast, with all of the county's towns located on saltwater.

The largest town in the county is Ålesund located within Ålesund Municipality. The town itself has a population of 52,626 in the agglomeration which it forms together with parts of neighboring Sula Municipality.

Rank	Town/Urban Area	Municipality	Region	Population (2022)
1	Ålesund	Ålesund Municipality and Sula Municipality	Sunnmøre	59,663
2	Molde	Molde Municipality	Romsdal	33,291
3	Kristiansund	Kristiansund Municipality	Nordmøre	24,479
4	Ørsta	Ørsta Municipality	Sunnmøre	7,252
5	Volda	Volda Municipality	Sunnmøre	6,891
6	Ulsteinvik	Ulstein Municipality	Sunnmøre	5,936
7	Aure	Sykkylven Municipality	Sunnmøre	4,314
8	Nordstrand	Giske Municipality	Sunnmøre	4,262
9	Sunndalsøra	Sunndal Municipality	Nordmøre	3,907
10	Hareid	Hareid Municipality	Sunnmøre	3,467

=== Municipalities ===
Møre og Romsdal has a total of 26 municipalities.

Municipal Number	Name	Adm. Centre	Location in the county	Established	Includes (former municipalities)
1505	Kristiansund Municipality	Kristiansund		1 Jan 2008	1554 Bremsnes Municipality (part); 1555 Grip Municipality; 1556 Frei Municipality
1506	Molde Municipality	Molde		1 Jan 2020	1542 Eresfjord og Vistdal Municipality; 1543 Nesset Municipality; 1544 Bolsøy Municipality; 1545 Midsund Municipality; 1545 Sør-Aukra Municipality
1507	Ålesund Municipality	Ålesund		1 Jan 2020	1523 Ørskog Municipality; 1529 Skodje Municipality; 1530 Vatne Municipality; 1531 Borgund Municipality; 1534 Haram Municipality; 1546 Sandøy Municipality (part)
1511	Vanylven Municipality	Fiskåbygd		1 Jan 1838	1512 Syvde Municipality; 1513 Rovde Municipality (part)
1514	Sande Municipality	Larsnes		1 Jan 1867	1513 Rovde Municipality (part)
1515	Herøy Municipality	Fosnavåg		1 Jan 1838	
1516	Ulstein Municipality	Ulsteinvik		1 Jan 1838	
1517	Hareid Municipality	Hareid		1 Jan 1917	
1520	Ørsta Municipality	Ørsta		1 Aug 1883	1521 Vartdal Municipality; 1522 Hjørundfjord Municipality
1525	Stranda Municipality	Stranda		1 Jan 1838	1523 Sunnylven Municipality
1528	Sykkylven Municipality	Aure		1 Aug 1883	
1531	Sula Municipality	Langevåg		1 Jan 1977	
1532	Giske Municipality	Valderhaugstrand		1 Jan 1908	1533 Vigra Municipality
1535	Vestnes Municipality	Vestnes		1 Jan 1838	1536 Tresfjord Municipality
1539	Rauma Municipality	Åndalsnes		1 Jan 1964	1537 Voll Municipality; 1537 Eid og Voll Municipality; 1538 Eid Municipality; 1539 Grytten Municipality; 1540 Hen Municipality; 1541 Veøy Municipality (part)
1547	Aukra Municipality	Falkhytta		1 Jan 1838	1546 Sandøy Municipality (part)
1554	Averøy Municipality	Bruhagen		1 Jan 1964	1552 Kornstad Municipality; 1553 Kvernes Municipality; 1554 Bremsnes Municipality
1557	Gjemnes Municipality	Batnfjordsøra		1 Sep 1893	1553 Kvernes Municipality (part); 1558 Øre Municipality
1560	Tingvoll Municipality	Tingvollvågen		1 Jan 1838	1559 Straumsnes Municipality; 1564 Stangvik Municipality (part)
1563	Sunndal Municipality	Sunndalsøra		1 Jan 1838	1561 Øksendal Municipality; 1562 Ålvundeid Municipality; 1564 Stangvik Municipality (part)
1566	Surnadal Municipality	Skei		1 Jan 1838	1564 Stangvik Municipality (part); 1565 Åsskard Municipality
1573	Smøla Municipality	Hopen		1 Jan 1960	1573 Edøy Municipality; 1574 Brattvær Municipality; 1575 Hopen Municipality
1576	Aure Municipality	Aure		1 Jan 1838	1568 Stemshaug Municipality; 1570 Valsøyfjord Municipality; 1572 Tustna Municipality
1577	Volda Municipality	Volda		1 Jan 1838	1444 Hornindal Municipality; 1518 Dalsfjord Municipality
1578	Fjord Municipality	Stordal		1 Jan 2020	1524 Norddal Municipality; 1526 Stordal Municipality
1579	Hustadvika Municipality	Elnesvågen		1 Jan 2020	1548 Fræna Municipality; 1549 Bud Municipality; 1550 Hustad Municipality; 1551 Eide Municipality

Religion in Møre og Romsdal
religion	percent
Christianity	90.23%
Islam	0.39%
Buddhism	0.12%
Other	9.26%

== Infrastructure ==
Møre og Romsdal is served by nine airports, of which only the four airports located near the four largest centres have regular domestic flights. The largest airport in the county is Ålesund Airport, Vigra, which offers the only scheduled international routes from any airport in Møre og Romsdal. Ålesund Airport had 732,614 passengers in 2006. Kristiansund Airport, Kvernberget, had 364,350 passengers in 2007, while Molde Airport, Årø, had 401,292, down from 444,677 in 2006. Ørsta–Volda Airport, Hovden, had 49,842 passengers in 2006. None of the airports in Møre og Romsdal offer regular flights to each other.

In 2007, Møre og Romsdal had 6,339 kilometres (3,939 mi) of public roads, an increase of 5 kilometres (3.1 mi) since the previous year, as well as 4,258 kilometres (2,646 mi) of private roads, 7 kilometres (4.3 mi) more than in 2006.

There is one railway, the Rauma Line, which starts at Åndalsnes and connects to the main railway network of Norway. Public buses and ferries are operated by the county, using the brand name FRAM.

== Economy of the county administration (fylkeskommune) ==
As of 2024, the economy of the county administration (fylkeskommune) is in a troublesome situation; According to the media, no other county administration has as much of a troublesome situation. It is responsible for upper secondary schools, dental care, public transport, county roads, culture, cultural heritage management, land use planning and business development.

== History ==
Historical population
Year	Pop.	±%
1951	191,621	—
1961	213,286	+11.3%
1971	223,709	+4.9%
1981	236,062	+5.5%
1991	238,278	+0.9%
2001	243,810	+2.3%
2011	253,904	+4.1%
2021	265,544	+4.6%
Source: Statistics Norway.

The county (with its current borders) was established in 1671 - but after just four years (in 1675) it was divided into two amts (counties): Romsdal (which included Nordmøre) and Sunnmøre (which included Nordfjord). In 1680 (only 5 years later), Sunnmøre (including Nordfjord) was merged into Bergenhus amt. Then in 1689 (another 9 years later), the three regions of Romsdal, Sunnmøre, and Nordmøre were again merged into one amt/county: Romsdalen. Then in 1701 (another 11 years later) Romsdalen amt was split and divided between Trondhjems amt (which got Romsdal and Nordmøre) and Bergenhus amt (which got Sunnmøre). In 1704 (a mere 4 years later), the three regions of Romsdal, Sunnmøre, and Nordmøre were again merged into one county. The borders of the county have not been changed much since 1704. The annex parish of Vinje within the larger Hemne parish was transferred from Romsdalens amt to Søndre Trondhjems amt in 1838 (according to the 1838 Formannskapsdistrikt law, a parish could no longer be divided between two counties, so Vinje had to be in the same county as the rest of the parish).

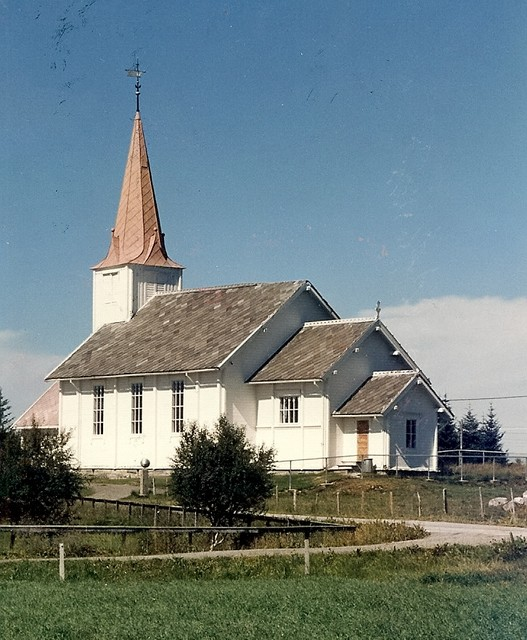
Edøy Church

On 1 January 2019, Rindal Municipality was transferred from Møre og Romsdal county to the neighboring Trøndelag county. On 1 January 2020, Halsa Municipality became part of the new Heim Municipality in Trøndelag county.

In 2019, archaeologists from the Norwegian Institute for Cultural Heritage Research, using large-scale high-resolution radar technology, determined that a 17-meter-long Viking ship was buried on the island of Edøya near Edøy Church. They estimate the ship's age as over 1,000 years: from the Merovingian or Viking period; the group planned to conduct additional searches in the area. A similar burial was found previously by a NIKU team in 2018, in Gjellestad.

== Parishes ==
- Aukra (Akerø)
- Aure
- Austefjord
- Bergmo
- Bjørke
- Bolsøy
- Borgund
- Brattvåg
- Brattvær
- Bremsnes
- Bud (Boe)
- Dalsfjord
- Edøy
- Old Edøy
- Eid
- Eide
- Eikesdal
- Ellingsøy
- Eresfjord
- Fiksdal
- Fjørtoft
- Frei (Fredøe)
- Fræna
- Geiranger
- Giske
- Gjemnes
- Gjøra
- Godøy
- Grip
- Grytten
- Gullstein
- Gursken
- Halsa
- Hamnsund
- Haram
- Hareid
- Harøy
- Hen
- Herøy
- Hildre
- Hjørundfjord
- Hof
- Holm
- Hopen
- Hov
- Hustad
- Ikornnes
- Indre Fræna
- Indre Herøy
- Indre Sula
- Kilsfjord
- Kirkelandet
- Kleive
- Kornstad
- Kors
- Kristiansund
- Kvernes
- Kvernes Stave
- Langevåg
- Larsnes
- Leikanger
- Liabygda
- Mo
- Molde
- Myrbostad
- Nesset
- Nord Aukra
- Nord-Heggdal
- Nordbyen
- Norddal
- Nordlandet
- Otrøy
- Otterøy
- Ranes (Skei)
- Rindal
- Roald
- Romfo
- Rovde
- Røbekk
- Rød
- Rødven
- Rødven Stave
- Røvik
- Saint Jetmund
- Sande
- Sandøy
- Sekken
- Sira Church (Nesset)
- Skarbøvik
- Skei
- Skodje
- Smøla
- Spjelkavik
- Stangvik
- Stemshaug
- Old Stordal
- Stordal
- Stranda
- Straumsnes
- Sunndal
- Sunnylven
- Surnadal (Surendal)
- Sykkylven
- Sylte
- Syvde
- Sør Aukra
- Sør-Tustna
- Tingvoll
- Todalen
- Tresfjord
- Tustna
- Ulstein
- Valderøy
- Valsøyfjord
- Vanylven
- Vartdal
- Vatne
- Vestnes
- Veøy
- Old Veøy
- Vigra
- Vike
- Vistdal
- Volda
- Voll
- Volsdalen
- Vågstranda
- Vågøy
- Ytre Fræna
- Øksendal
- Øre
- Ørskog
- Ørsta
- Øverdalen
- Øvre Rindal
- Øye
- Ålesund
- Ålvundeid
- Åram
- Åsskard
- Kristiansund Branch (LDS, 1904–1923)
- Ålesund Branch (LDS, early-1923)

== Villages ==
- Alnes
- Angvik
- Aukrasanden
- Aure, Aure
- Aure, Sykkylven
- Austnes
- Batnfjordsøra
- Boggestranda
- Brandal
- Brattvåg
- Bremsnes
- Bruhagen
- Bud
- Dravlaus
- Dyrkorn
- Eggesbønes
- Eide
- Eidsbygda
- Eidsdal
- Eidsvik
- Eidsvåg
- Eikesdalen
- Eiksund
- Elnesvågen
- Eresfjord
- Fiksdal
- Fiskåbygd
- Flemma
- Flåskjer
- Fyrde
- Geiranger
- Gjemnes
- Gjøra
- Glærem
- Grip
- Grøa
- Gullstein
- Gursken
- Haddal
- Halsanaustan
- Hareid
- Hausbygda
- Heggem
- Helle
- Hellesylt
- Helsem
- Hjelset
- Hjørungavåg
- Hoelsand
- Hoffland
- Hollingen
- Hopen
- Hovland
- Hustad
- Ikornnes
- Innfjorden
- Isfjorden
- Jordalsgrenda
- Kleive
- Kornstad
- Kvalsund
- Kvernes
- Kårvåg
- Langevåg
- Larsnes
- Langøy
- Leikong
- Leira
- Leitebakk
- Liabygda
- Liabøen
- Longva
- Løvika
- Malme
- Malmefjorden
- Mauseidvåg
- Midsund
- Mittet
- Mo
- Myklebost, Sandøy
- Myklebost, Vanylven
- Myklebostad
- Myklebost
- Måndalen
- Nedre Frei
- Nesjestranda
- Nord-Heggdal
- Norddal
- Nordstrand
- Ona
- Rausand
- Rensvik
- Roald
- Romfo
- Rovdane
- Råket
- Røbekk
- Rødven
- Røssøyvågen
- Røvika
- Sjøholt
- Skei
- Skodje
- Slagnes
- Spjelkavik
- Stangvik
- Steinshamn
- Stemshaug
- Stordal
- Store Standal
- Stranda
- Straumgjerde
- Straumshamn
- Sunndalsøra
- Surnadalsøra
- Sylte, Fræna
- Sylte, Norddal
- Sylte, Surnadal
- Syvde
- Sølsnes
- Søvik
- Sæbø
- Sætre
- Tafjord
- Tennfjord
- Tingvollvågen
- Todalen
- Todalsøra
- Tomrefjord
- Tornes
- Torvikbukt
- Tresfjord
- Tusvik
- Tømmervåg
- Valle
- Valsøybotnen
- Valsøyfjord
- Varhaugvika
- Vatne
- Veblungsnes
- Veiholmen
- Verma
- Vestnes
- Vevang
- Vik
- Vikebukt
- Visnes
- Vistdal
- Volda
- Voll
- Vågstranda
- Øksendalsøra
- Øre
- Ørsta
- Åfarnes
- Åheim
- Ålvund
- Ålvundeidet
- Åram
- Årset
- Åsskard

== Former Municipalities ==
- Bolsøy Municipality
- Borgund Municipality
- Brattvær Municipality
- Bremsnes Municipality
- Bud Municipality
- Dalsfjord Municipality
- Edøy Municipality
- Eid Municipality
- Eid og Voll Municipality
- Eide Municipality
- Eresfjord og Vistdal Municipality
- Frei Municipality
- Fræna Municipality
- Grip Municipality
- Grytten Municipality
- Halsa Municipality
- Hen Municipality
- Hjørundfjord Municipality
- Hopen Municipality
- Hustad Municipality
- Kornstad Municipality
- Kvernes Municipality
- Midsund Municipality
- Nesset Municipality
- Norddal Municipality
- Rovde Municipality
- Sandøy Municipality
- Skodje Municipality
- Stangvik Municipality
- Stemshaug Municipality
- Stordal Municipality
- Straumsnes Municipality
- Sunnylven Municipality
- Syvde Municipality
- Sør-Aukra Municipality
- Tresfjord Municipality
- Tustna Municipality
- Valsøyfjord Municipality
- Vartdal Municipality
- Vatne Municipality
- Veøy Municipality
- Vigra Municipality
- Voll Municipality
- Øksendal Municipality
- Øre Municipality
- Ørskog Municipality
- Ålvundeid Municipality
- Åsskard Municipality

== See also ==
- Augustinius Neldal Lossius
