= Veøy =

Veøy may refer to:

== Places ==
- Veøy Municipality, a former municipality in Møre og Romsdal county, Norway
- Veøya (historically spelled: Veøy), an island in Molde Municipality in Møre og Romsdal county, Norway
- Old Veøy Church, a former church (now museum) in Molde Municipality in Møre og Romsdal county, Norway
- Veøy Church, a church in Molde Municipality in Møre og Romsdal county, Norway

== Other ==
- Veøy Buss (formerly Veøy AS), a transportation company located in Romsdal, Norway
