= Sekken Church =

Church in Møre og Romsdal, Norway

- Sekken kyrkje
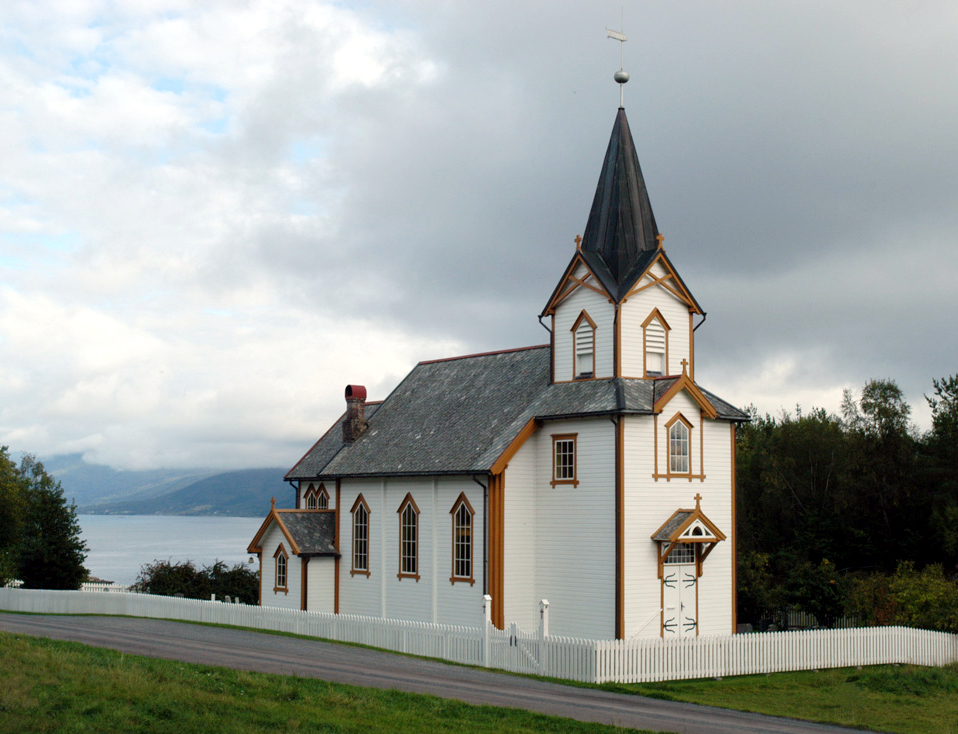
- View of the church
- Sekken Church
- 62°39′38″N 7°22′56″E
- Location: Molde Municipality, Møre og Romsdal
- Country: Norway
- Denomination: Church of Norway
- Churchmanship: Evangelical Lutheran

History
- Status: Parish church
- Founded: 1908
- Consecrated: 28 October 1908

Architecture
- Functional status: Active
- Architect(s): Ole Havnæs and Knut Flåthe
- Architectural type: Long church
- Style: Swiss chalet style
- Completed: 1908 (118 years ago)

Specifications
- Capacity: 130
- Materials: Wood

Administration
- Diocese: Møre bispedømme
- Deanery: Molde domprosti
- Parish: Sekken
- Norwegian Cultural Heritage Site
- Type: Church
- Status: Not protected
- ID: 85412

Sekken Church (Norwegian: Sekken kyrkje; formerly: Sekken kapell) is a parish church of the Church of Norway in Molde Municipality in Møre og Romsdal county, Norway. It is located at the eastern tip of the island of Sekken which is located in the Romsdal Fjord, at the mouth of the Langfjorden. It is the church for the Sekken parish which is part of the Molde domprosti (arch-deanery) in the Diocese of Møre. The white, wooden church was built in a long church design with a Swiss chalet style in 1908 by the architects Ole Havnæs and Knut Flåthe. The church seats about 130 people.

== History ==
The municipal council of the old Veøy Municipality voted unanimously on 4 January 1902 to petition the government for the construction of a chapel and graveyard on the island of Sekken. The people used to attend the Old Veøy Church on the neighboring island of Veøya, but in 1901, that church was closed and a new Veøy Church was built on the mainland. This left the people of Sekken island much further from their church. In 1908, a royal decree was issued authorizing the construction of the new chapel. The building was consecrated on 28 October 1908. The church bell from the Old Veøy Church was installed in the chapel's tower.

== Media gallery ==
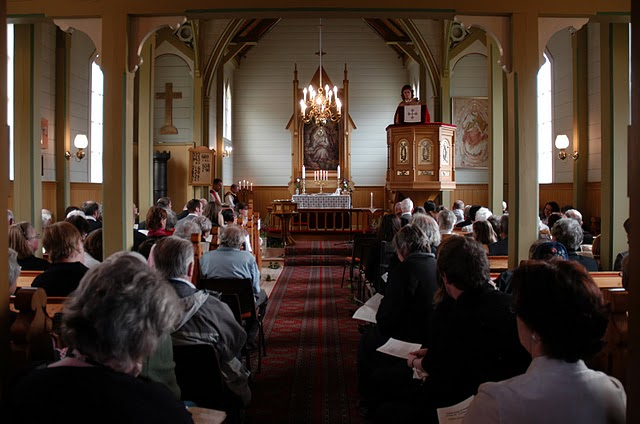
Interior

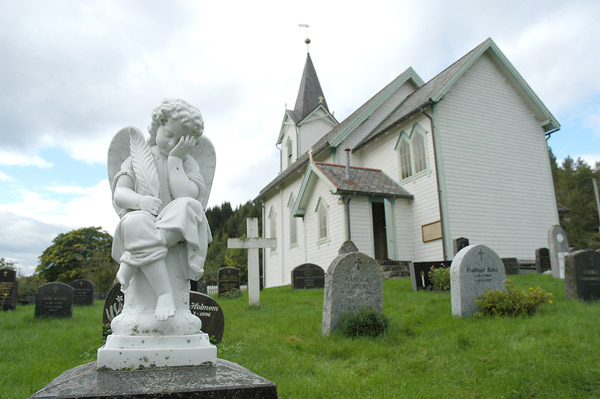
Exterior

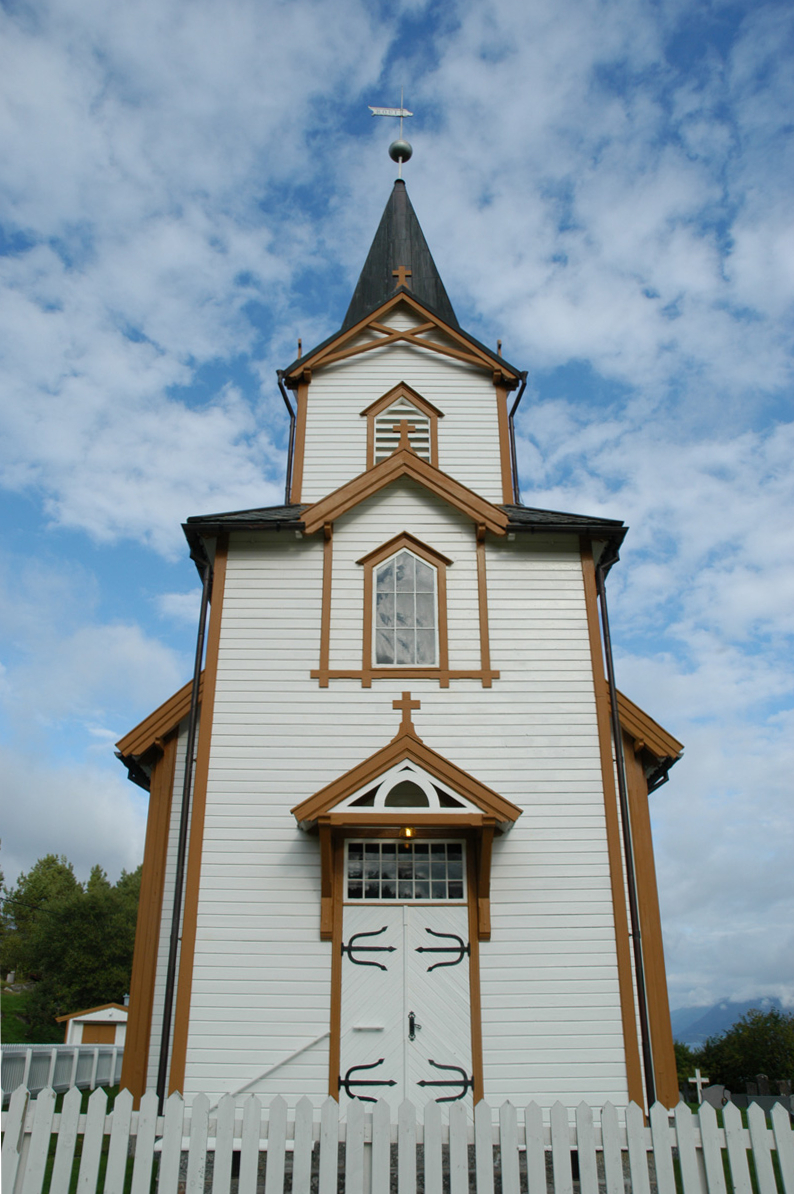
Front entrance

== See also ==
- List of churches in Møre
