= Jens Stub =

Norwegian politician (1764–1819)

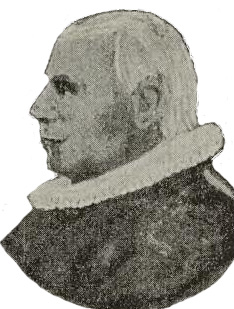
Jens Stub

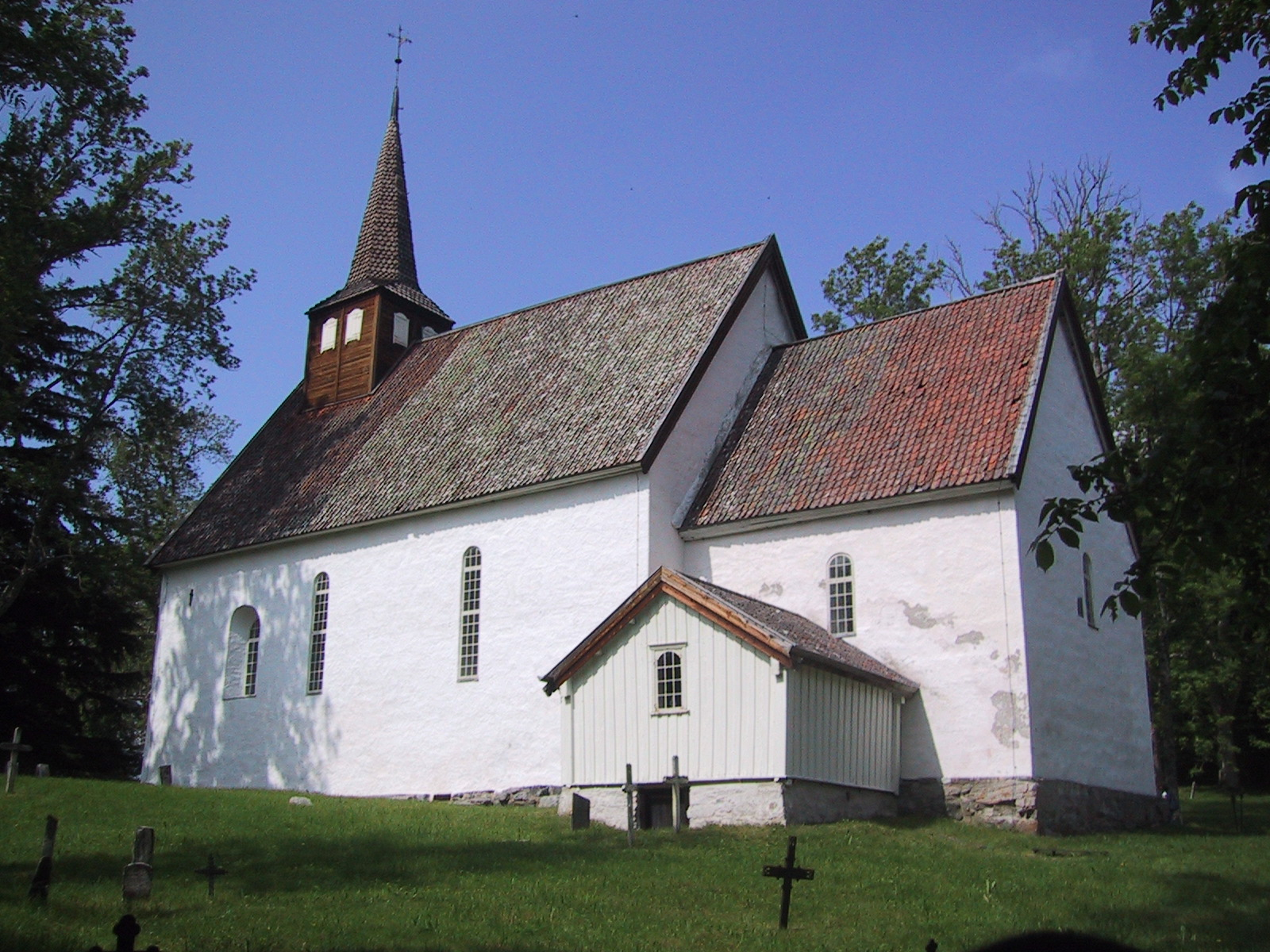
Old Veøy Church on Veøya

Jens Stub (3 March 1764 – 24 October 1819) was a Norwegian priest and politician. He was vicar on the island of Veøya and served as a representative at the Norwegian Constitutional Assembly at Eidsvoll in 1814.

== Biography ==
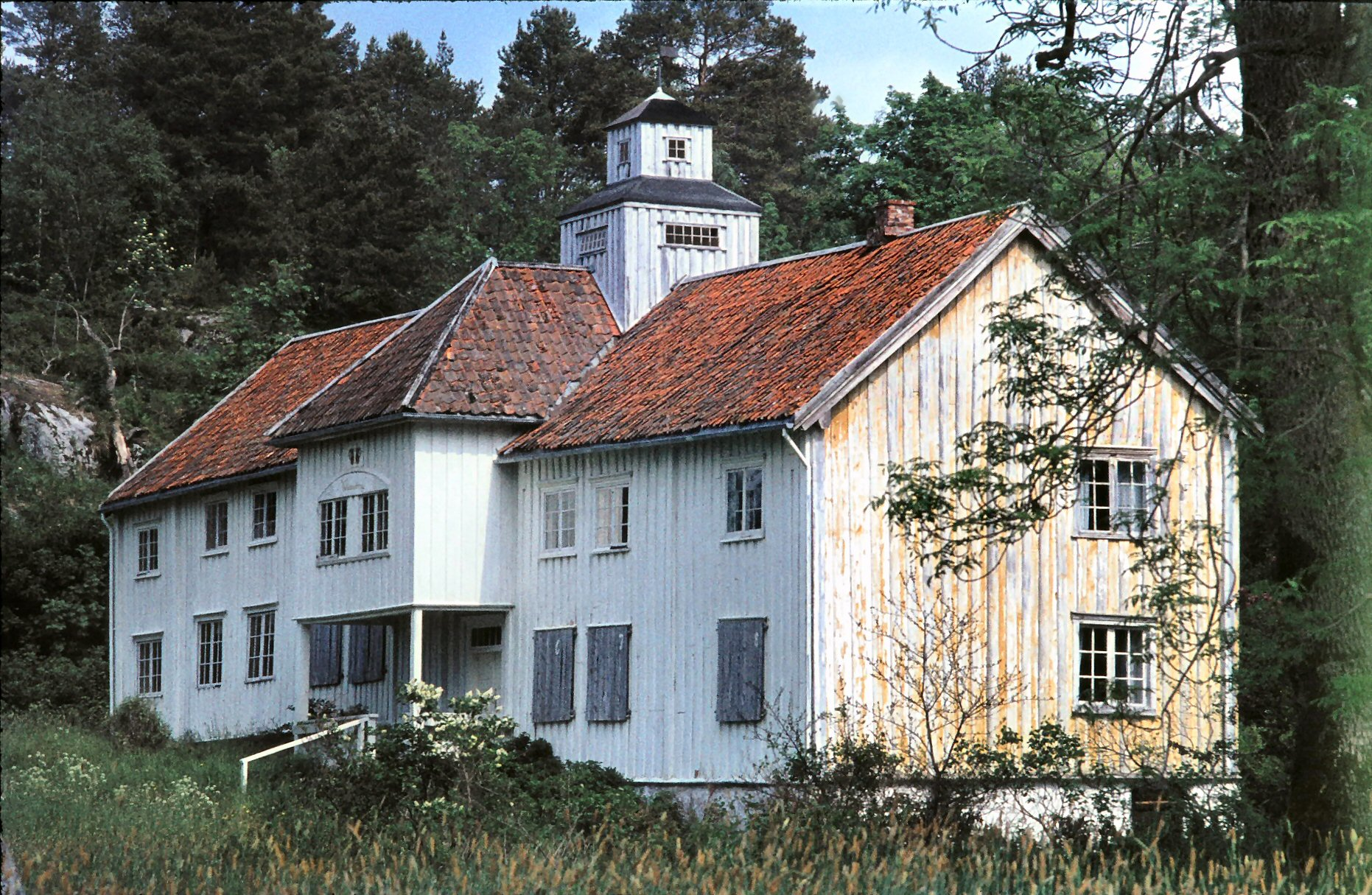
Veøy Vicarage on Veøya

He was the son of district stipendiary magistrate (sorenskriver) Johan Daniel Stub (1736–1802) and grandson of Lauritz Stub (1708–1774), both of whom served as judges in Bergen. He grew up in the parish of Eid in the county of Nordre Bergenhus, Norway. His brother was Gerhard Heiberg Stub (1781–1831), a merchant in Bergen. In August 1793 he married his cousin Gjertrud Helene Heiberg (1774–1852) at Talvik in Finnmark.

Jens Stub was a priest by education. He earned his degree in theology (Cand.theol.) in 1788. He was a Church of Norway priest at Alta Church in Finnmark. He was vicar of Veøy Church in Romsdalsfjord from 1801 until his death, when he was succeeded by Johan Christopher Haar Daae.

Stub was a member of the Norwegian Constitutional Assembly at Eidsvoll Manor in 1814. He served as a representative of Romsdals Amt together with Hilmar Meincke Krohg and Elling Olsson Walbøe. During negotiations at the National Assembly, he voted with the Union Party (Unionspartiet). He died in a boating accident during 1819 at Tresfjord in Romsdal county.
