= Jonas Lie =

Jonas Lie may refer to:

- Jonas Lie (writer) (1833–1908), Norwegian writer
- Jonas Lie (government minister) (1899–1945), Norwegian politician
- Jonas Lie (painter) (1880–1940), Norwegian-born American painter
- Jonas Lied (1881–1969), Norwegian businessman
