= Jonas Lied =

Norwegian entrepreneur, businessman, diplomat, author and art collector

Consul Jonas M. Lied
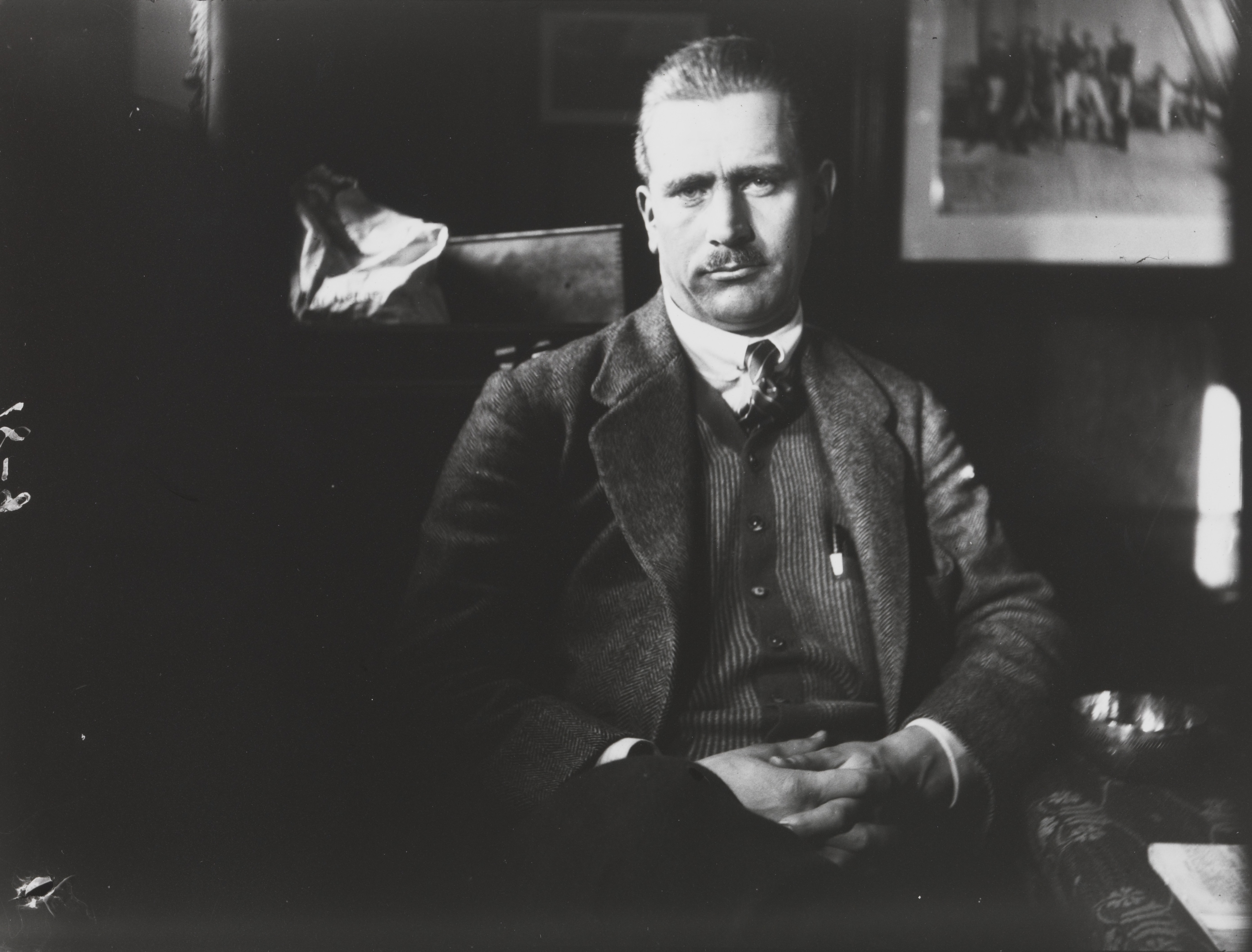
- Lied photographed by Fridtjof Nansen on 1913 voyage
- Born: 17 June 1881; Sølsnes, Veøy Municipality
- Died: 25 April 1969 (aged 87); Sølsnes, Molde
- Resting place: Old Veøy Church
- Citizenship: Norway, Russia/Soviet Union
- Occupations: businessperson, diplomat
- Years active: 1900–1946
- Known for: business in Russia, art collection
- Notable work: Return to Happiness

Jonas Marius Lied (17 July 1881 in Sølsnes in Veøy Municipality – 25 April 1969 at Sølsnes, Molde Municipality) was a Norwegian entrepreneur, businessman, diplomat, author and art collector. He obtained a short vocational business education and was proficient in English, French, German and Russian. Lied was also a noted athlete, for instance in 1906 together with Erik Ole Bye he won the Lyle Cup for double sculls. He established The Siberian Steamship, Manufacturing & Trading Company (the Siberian Company; Norwegian: Det siberiske kompani) in 1912 with the purpose of importing and exporting goods through a new northern shipping lane and the Ob River and Yenisei River. He obtained Russian citizenship with the help of Grand Duke Alexander, but regained Norwegian citizenship in 1931 when he left the difficult times in the Soviet Union. According to the Russian tradition, he long used the signature "I.G. Lid" (Jonas Hansson Lied) after his father Hans ("Gans" in Russian).

The first expedition through the Kara Sea was completed in 1913 with explorer Fridtjof Nansen and Siberian industrialist Stephan Vostrotin as prominent passengers. The journey was a great success and the international press reported from the trip. Both Nansen and Lied gave several lectures. Lied lectured in Russian in St. Petersburg, in French at the Société Nautique, and in German at the geographical society in Hamburg. Nansen published a Through Siberia.

In 1914, Lied photographed British naval vessels in the port of Newcastle and was for this arrested according to the Defence of the Realm Act 1914. According to his autobiography, he wired Secretary of Trade Walter Runciman for help, and the charges were dropped.

== The Siberian Company ==
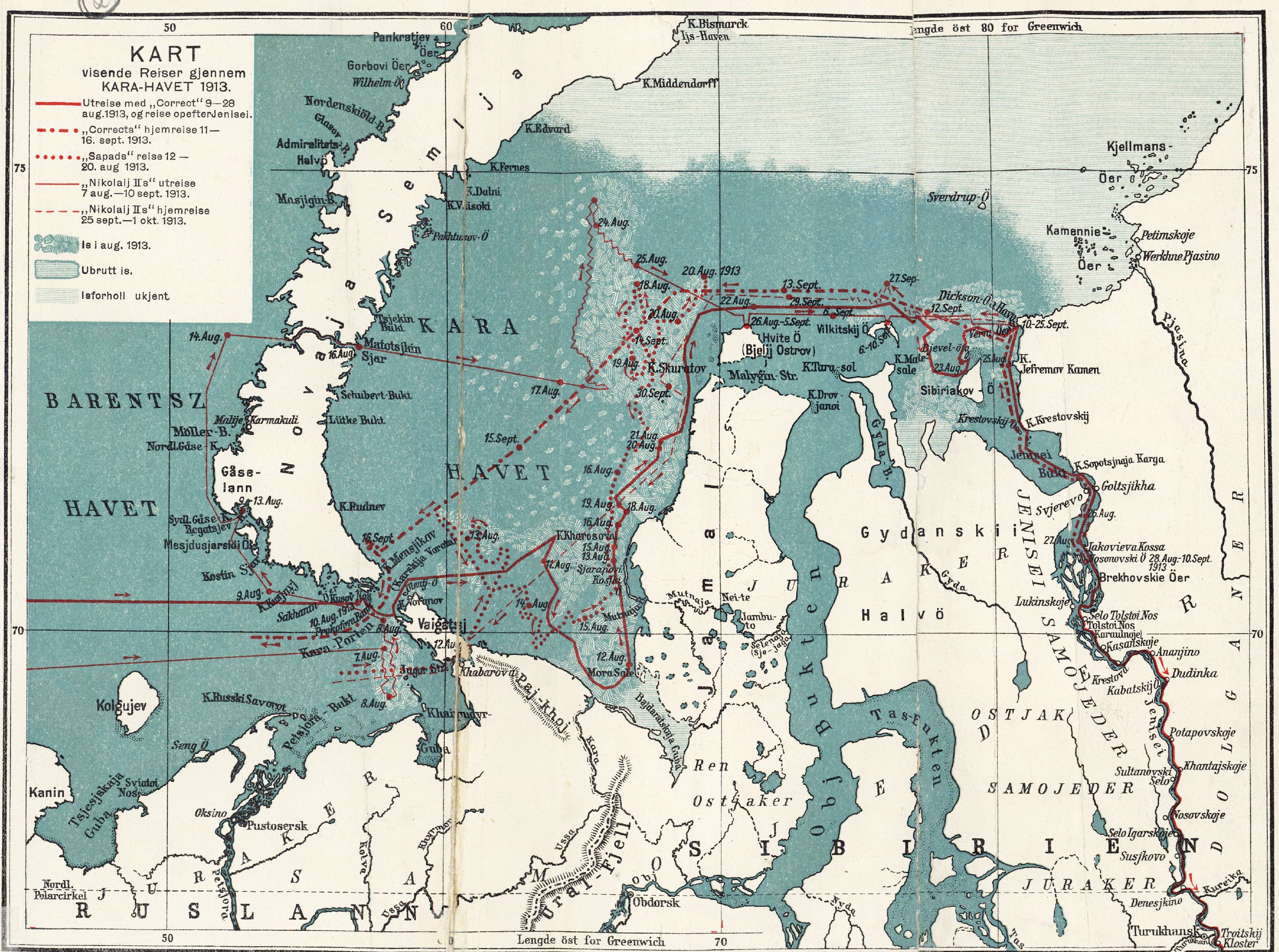
Journey of Lied's ship Correct and ice conditions in 1913. From Through Siberia. The Land of the Future (1914) by Fridtjof Nansen.

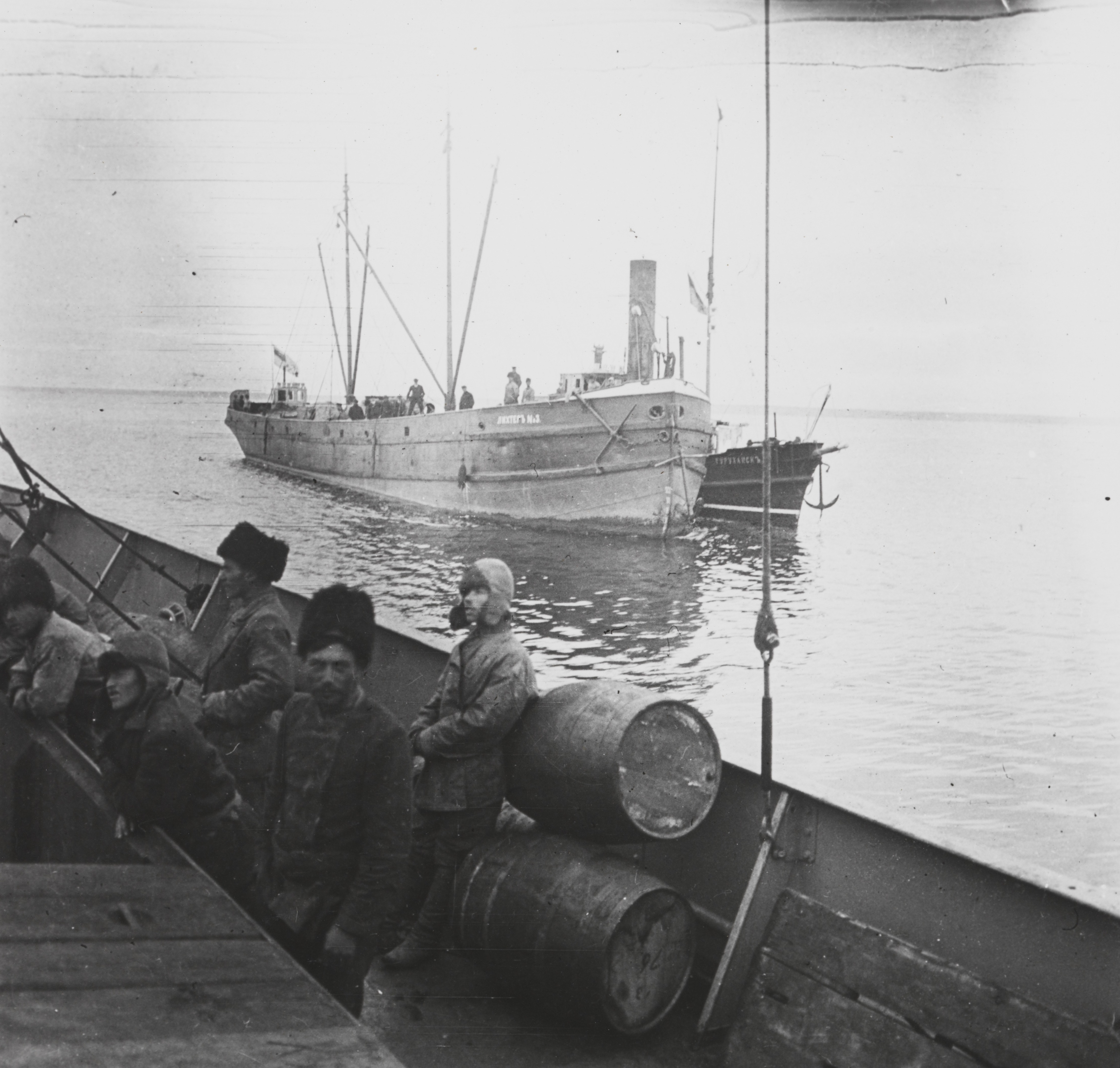
Lied's ship Correct and Russian boats at Yenisei, 1913

Lied's idea for a sea route to Yenisei came from the English businessman Alfred Derry and from Joseph Wiggins’ book on the Northeast Passage. Lied terminated his employment with the Burroughs Adding Machine Company and in 1912 founded The Siberian Steamship, Manufacturing & Trading Company). The company’s main office was in Krasnoyarsk and eventually offices in St Petersburg (26 Nevsky Prospect across the street from Kazan Cathedral), London, New York, Moscow, Novosibirsk and Arkhangelsk. The initial share capital was 142,000 NOK, and gradually expanded to 8 million in 1917. Lied’s plan was to transport goods through the great rivers of Siberia, and exchange goods to West European ocean vessels at these rivers' arctic mouth. From Krasnoyarsk the Yenisei is 2500 km and there was at that time no roads or railways along the river. Because of ice this northern route could only be used July through September.

In the summer of 1914 Lied organized the transport of river steam ships built in England and Germany to Siberia. The small convoy that should gather at Tromsø also included cargo ships with 30,000 barrels of cement to the Transsiberian railway. By late July 1914 Lied was still waiting for the last documents and instruments to be able to leave Cuxhaven. In bad weather on 30 July the boats left the German harbour even if the low river boats could hardly travel across the open ocean. The Tsar awarded Jonas Lied honorary citizenship of Russia for this bold operation. In Tromsø the German crew discovered that they were at war and they were replaced by Norwegian sailors. In Murmansk slight panic occurred as the small convoy of cargo ships was mistaken for German navy. At Dikson Island Lied encountered Otto Sverdrup that had run aground with his ship Eclipse. Sverdrup was on a search and rescue mission for the missing Sedov and Brusilov. Sverdrup's ship was pulled free with the help of Lied's boats.

In 1916 he set up a complete "Bolinder" saw mill from Sweden in the town of Maklakovo (now Lesosibirsk) at Yenisei. About 200 men were employed there when Lied set the saw mill in operation. On the same site one of Russia's largest saw mills is still in operation. In 1917 one of his ships was sunk by a submarine and Jonas' brother Hjalmar perished. His Russian citizenship allowed Lied to take control over Russian companies, including the shareholder majority for all private boats on Yenisei and some 50 river boats and 140 barges on Ob. Lied also built a fish canning factory in the same area.

On a trip to the US in March 1917 he had meetings with Theodore Roosevelt. Lied planned to invite Roosevelt on an expedition to Siberia, just like he had done with Nansen a few years earlier. In the meantime the February Revolution took place. The plan involving Roosevelt was never completed.

== Revolution ==
I was impressed with the personal power Lenin radiated. He was a man who knew very well what he wanted. Lenin saw right through me, Trotsky did not. Lenin had in no way use for a man of my type.

— Jonas Lied

Lied resided in Petrograd (St Petersburg) at the time of the October Revolution. He had meetings with Lenin and Trotsky at the Smolny Institute in 1917 and describes the unusual experience in his autobiography. During the meeting Trotsky had a constant grip on the pistol in his pocket, according to Lied's autobiography. The purpose of the meeting was to reach an agreement with the new regime for his Siberian company, but with no result. Lied then wanted to sell the company's assets, but the board of directors in Kristiania hesitated and Lied then resigned as CEO in February 1918. The company's assets where seized by the Bolshevik regime after the peace treaty with Germany in 1918.

Lied together with the British intelligence planned to rescue the Tsar and his family from their house arrest at Tobolsk. The plan involved the use of the Siberian company's boats on the Siberian rivers, the operation was called off by a nervous king George. Lied's diary mentions a meeting with Arthur Balfour on March 5, 1918, and with Robert Cecil on March 6, later also with Reginald Hall (head of MI6) and Michael Romanov (the tsar's cousin exiled in London). It is not clear if Lied initiated the plan himself or if he was merely invited by the British help with logistics. According to Anthony Summers, Lloyd George hesitated because he wanted to improve relations with the new regime in Russia, while king George insisted that his relatives should be rescued. Lied's own account of this bold plan has been confirmed by later research. In an attempt to capture some of the company's assets he travelled via Vladivostok to Omsk in 1919 and had meetings with the leader of the counter-revolution Alexander Kolchak. In May 1919 Lied was commissioned by Kolchak to negotiate with Winston Churchill (then UK defence minister) about supplies to Kolchak's Siberia, the plan was not implemented.

== After the Revolution ==
In February 1920 Lied again travelled to Russia when there was still a civil war. In Petrograd (St Petersburg) he met with Grigory Zinoviev then continued to Moscow. On the return trip he, according to the autobiography, was invited to Maxim Gorky's residence. Gorky wanted Lied's help to get Nansen and H.G. Wells send relief to the starving people of Petrograd (Nansen that summer travelled to Russia). After the revolution the properties of the Siberian company was nationalized by the new regime. Lied then established himself in Moscow as an independent businessman during Lenin's New Economic Policy from 1921. He was, among other activities, agent for the US aluminum company Alcoa. On behalf of Alcoa he was searching for bauxite as well as access to hydro electric power for aluminum production. Lied met with Trotsky on several occasions and traveled widely together with geologists within the Soviet Union. He also explored the possibilities of developing hydro power at Dneprostroi.

Around 1930 the surveillance by the secret police and the pressure from the Soviet authorities made life increasingly difficult for Lied. The secret police tried to enroll him as an agent to obtain information about the international aluminum industry. In February 1931 he was arrested and released after four hours interrogation. A few weeks later he secretly regained his Norwegian citizenship and left the Soviet Union with his Soviet passport in May 1931. According to his autobiography he had lost all his money. He soon continued an international business career as senior vice president of Aluminium Union Limited.

== Legacy ==
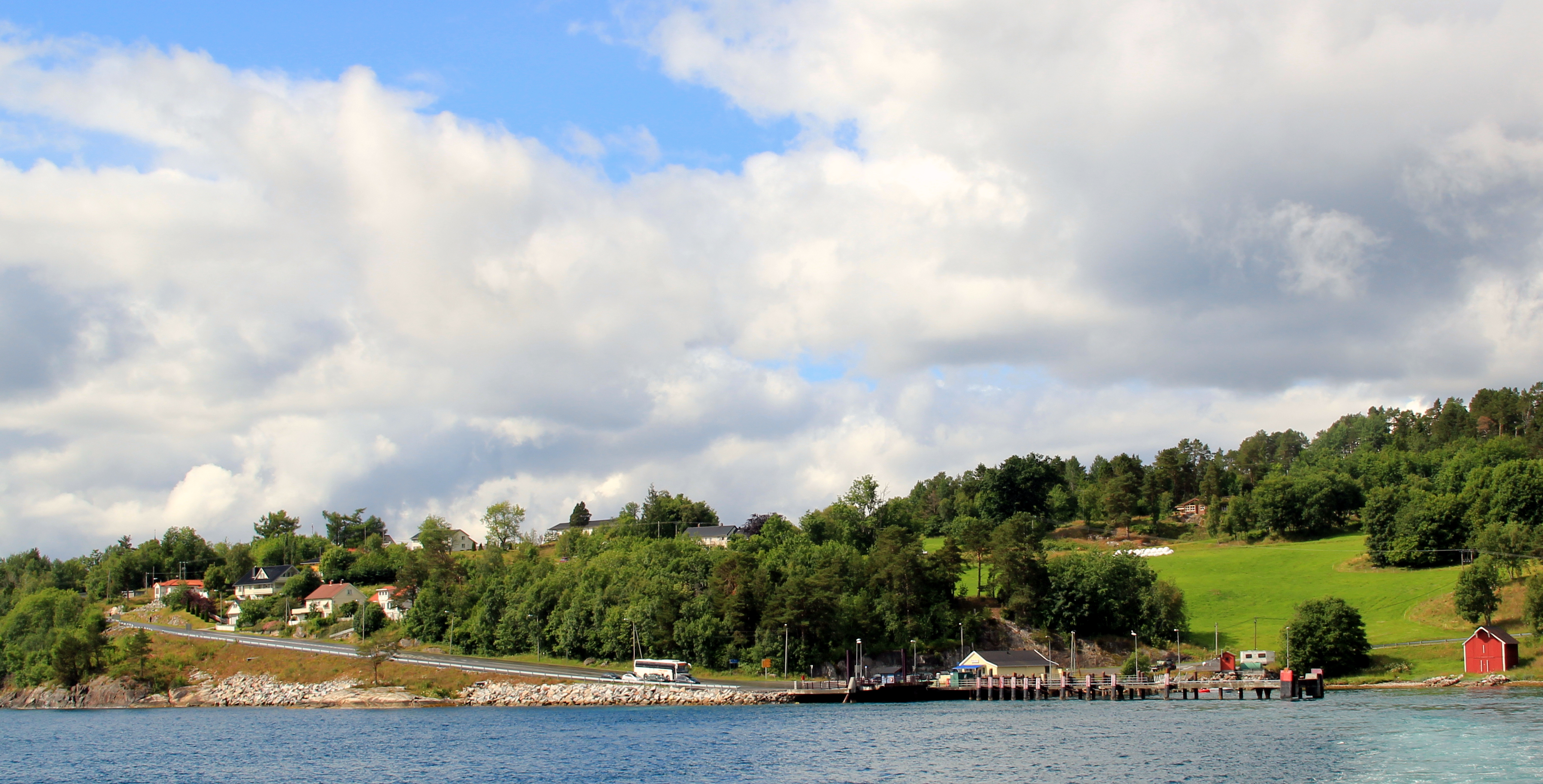
Sølsnes (now in Molde Municipality) where Jonas Lied was born and spent his old age.

In 1946 Lied retired from international business and settled on the small Sølsnes ancestral farm. Lied wrote detailed diaries from 1907 to 1966. During this period he had resided 15 years in Norway, 21 years in England, 20 years in Russia, two years in France and to years in Germany. Lied's Return to Happiness was translated to eight languages and became an international bestseller. Lied wrote the autobiography in London during the second world war and he dedicated the book to «Norway by a loyal son». He left behind a notable collection of Russian icons and other art (largely compiled during 1920 to 1924), some originated from the Winter palace. After the revolution there was a burglary in Lied's apartment in Petrograd and additional art may have disappeared. The art collection includes a portrait of Lied by Yury Annenkov (also known as Georges Annenkov). Lied befriended Annenkov in Moscow and met again by coincidence in Paris in 1933. At Sølsnes Marit Werenskiold discovered a previously unknown portrait of King Oscar by Konstantin Makovsky and several portraits purchased from count Sheremetev. There is also a disputed portrait of the author Ivan Krylov.

Lied donated diaries and records about the Siberian company to the Norwegian Maritime Museum, other archival material is now kept at Romsdal Museum. Lied donated 1/3 of his wealth to the renovation of Old Veøy Church. He was buried at the old disused Veøy church yard. Parts of his art collection was on display in Pushkin Museum and elsewhere in 2005. Professor Marit Werenskiold in 2008 edited Consul Jonas Lied and Russia. Collector, diplomat, industrial explorer 1910-1931.

=== Selected publications ===
- Sidelights on the Economic Situation in Russia, published in Moscow, 1922.
- Return to Happiness (autobiography, translated to eight languages). London: Macmillan, 1943.
- Over de høye fjelle (autobiography). Oslo: Dybwad, 1946.
- Sibirisk eventyr (originally Prospector in Sibiria, Oxford University Press). Copenhagen: Arnold Busck, 1955.
- En sjøvei blir til: Det sibiriske kompanis historie. Oslo: Mortensen, 1958.

== Gallery ==
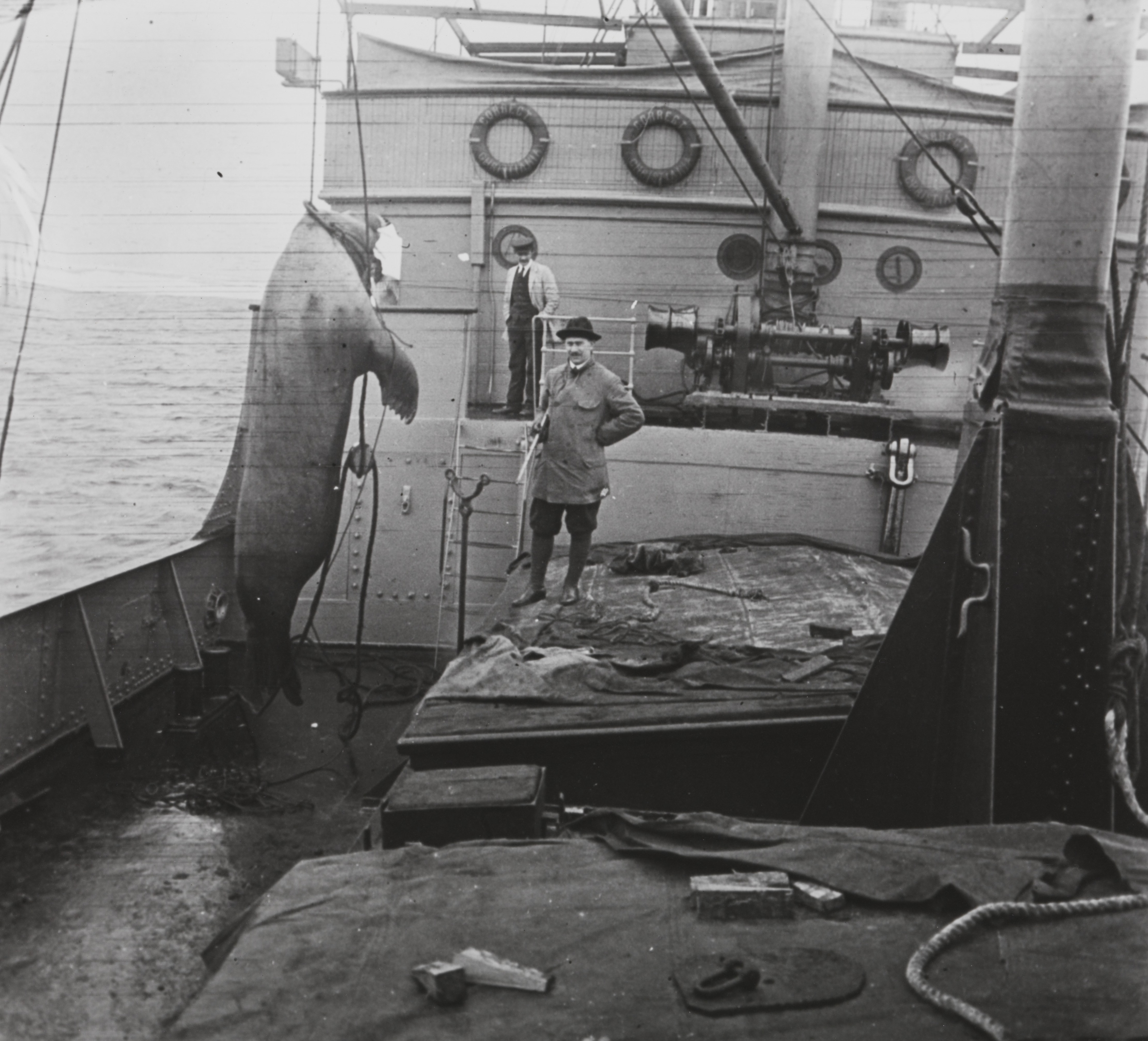
Jonas Lied with walrus, photo by Nansen, Kara Sea, 1913

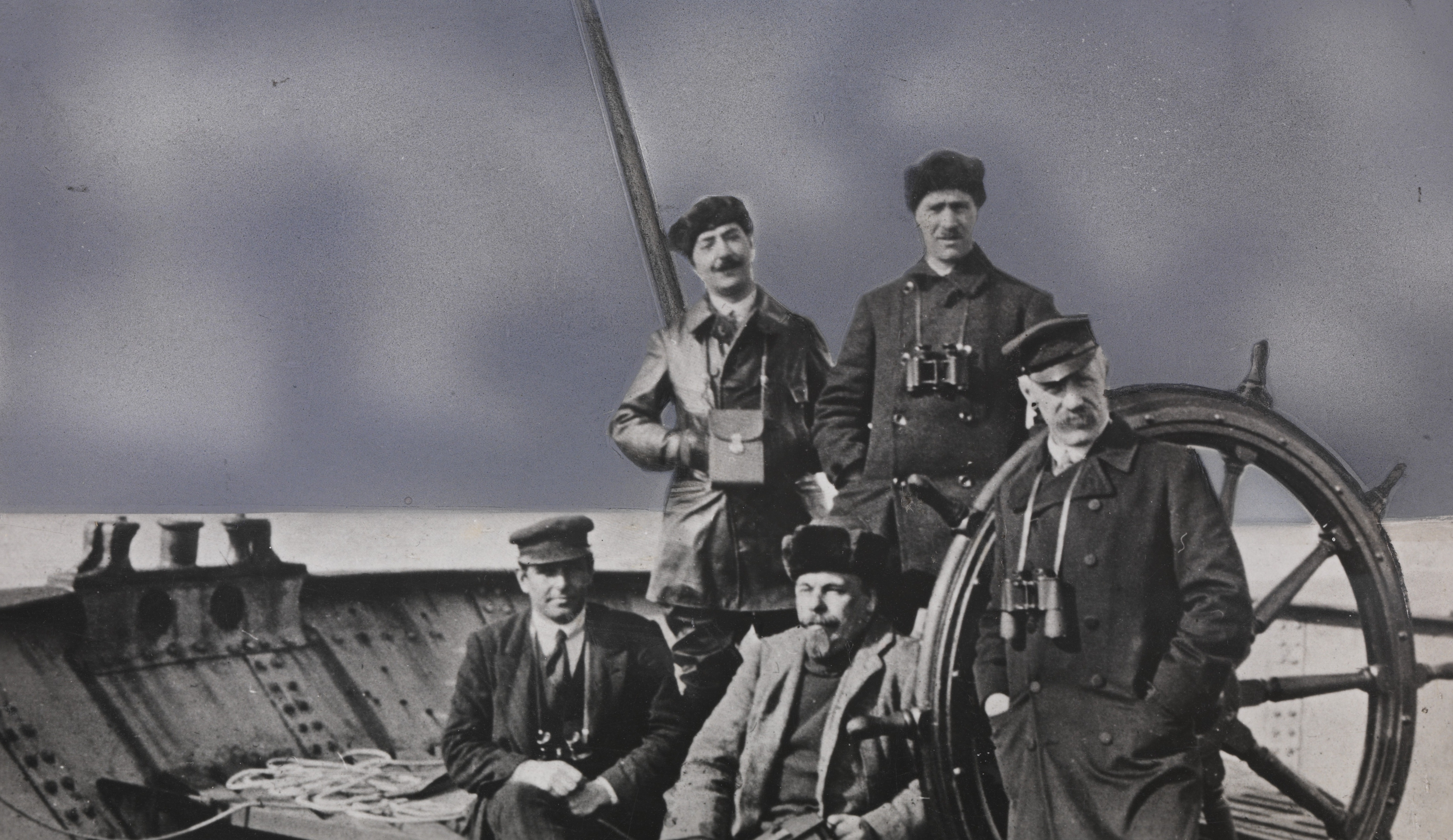
Siberia expedition, 1913. Behind: Loris-Melikov and Lied. Front: captain Samuelsen, Vostrotin, Nansen.

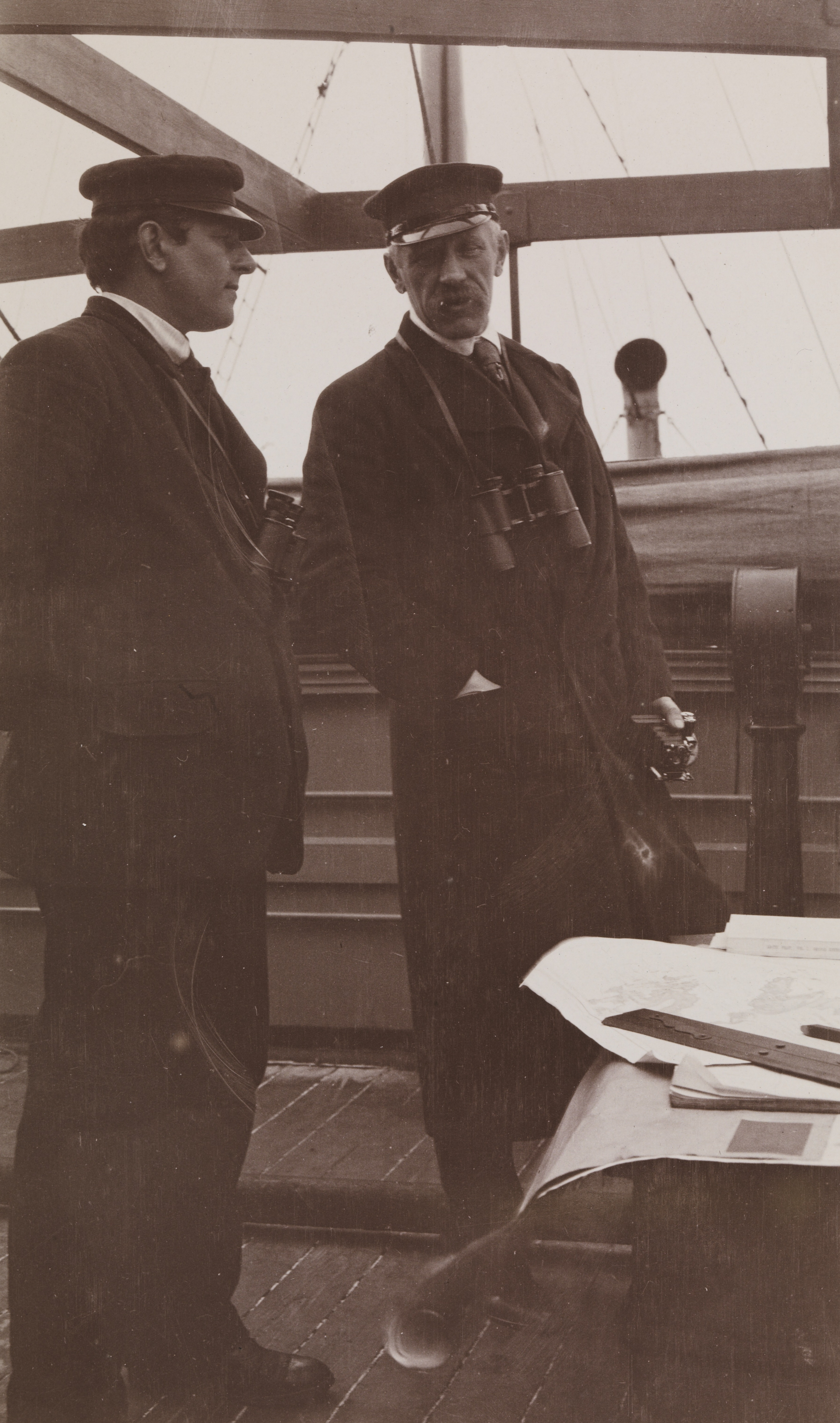
Nansen with captain Samuelsen onboard M/S «Correct», Kara Sea photo: Jonas Lied

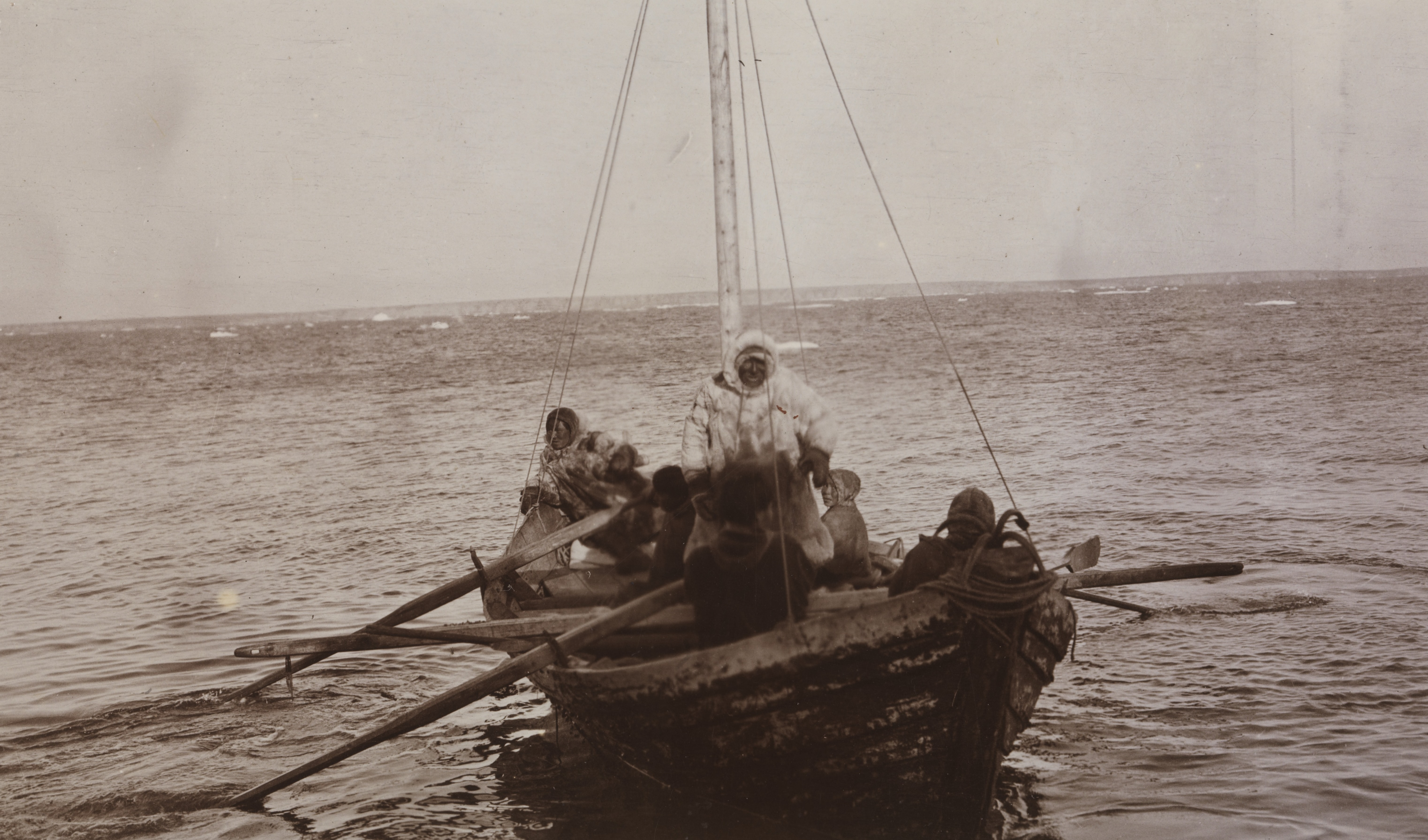
Lied encountersNenets people

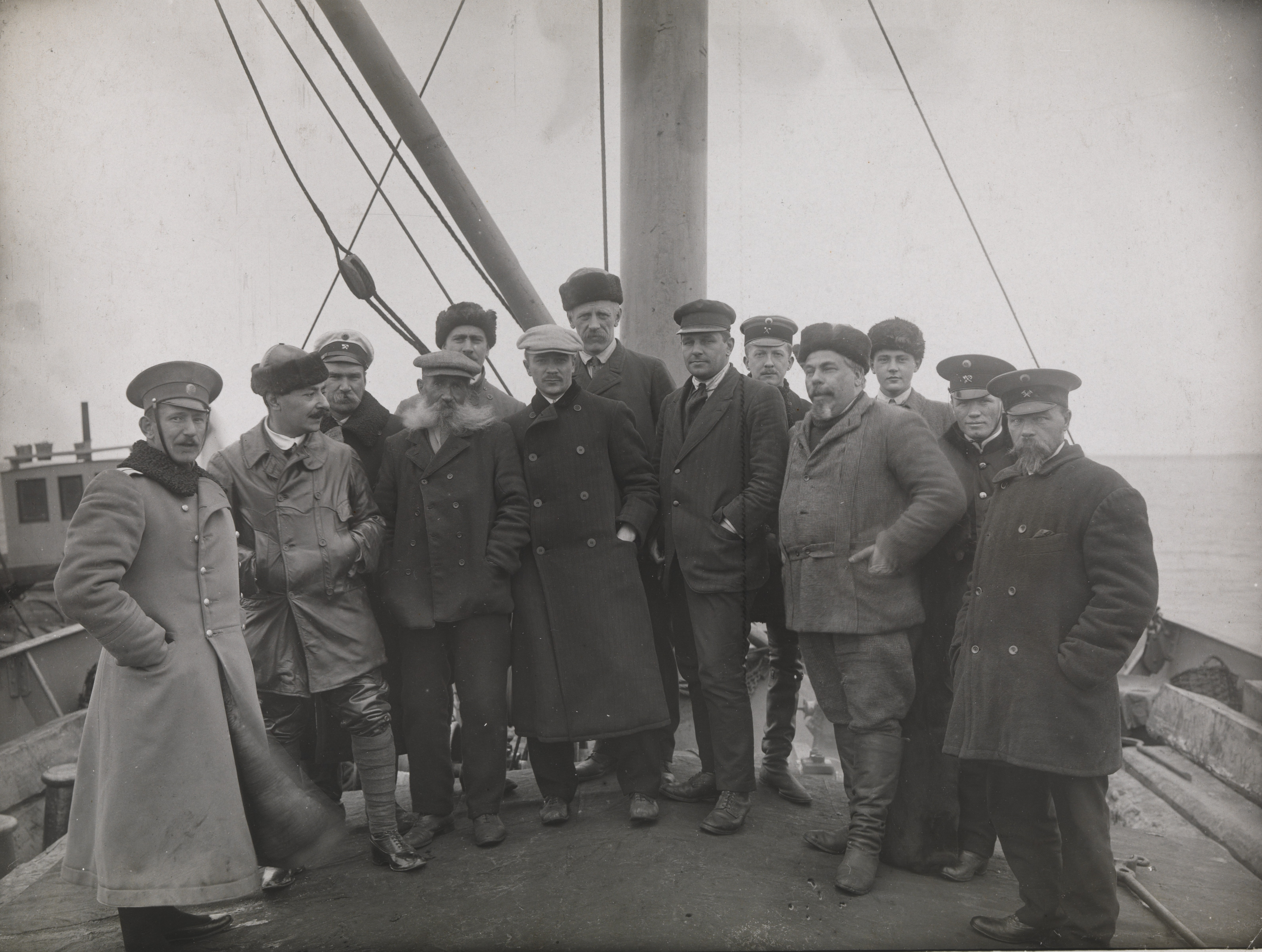
Lied and Nansen with Russian officers on Yenisei
