= Veøy Municipality =

Former municipality in Møre og Romsdal, Norway

Veøy Municipality Veøy herred
- Former municipality
- Veø herred (historic name)
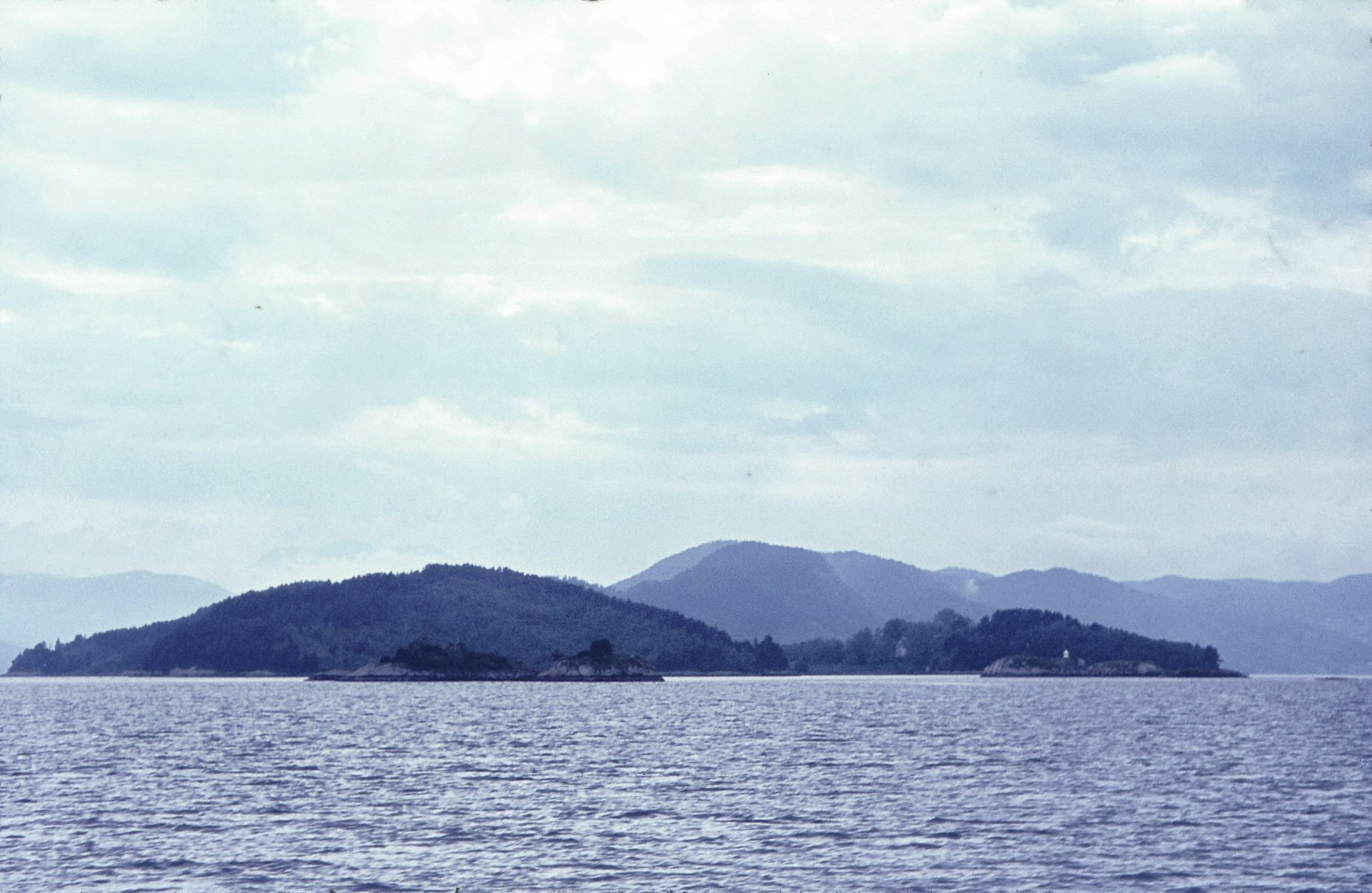
- View of Veøya island

- Møre og Romsdal within Norway

- Veøy within Møre og Romsdal
- Coordinates: 62°40′14″N 07°25′29″E
- Country: Norway
- County: Møre og Romsdal
- District: Romsdal
- Established: 1 Jan 1838
  - Created as: Formannskapsdistrikt
- Disestablished: 1 Jan 1964
  - Succeeded by: Molde Municipality and Rauma Municipality
- Administrative centre: Veøya

Area (upon dissolution)
  - Total: 247.1 km^{2} (95.4 sq mi)
  - Rank: #329 in Norway
- Highest elevation: 1,263 m (4,144 ft)

Population (1963)
  - Total: 2,208
  - Rank: #406 in Norway
  - Density: 8.9/km^{2} (23/sq mi)
  - Change (10 years): ▼ −8.2%
- Demonym: Veøygjelding

Official language
  - Norwegian form: Nynorsk
- Time zone: UTC+01:00 (CET)
  - Summer (DST): UTC+02:00 (CEST)
- ISO 3166 code: NO-1541

Veøy is a former municipality in Møre og Romsdal county, Norway. The 247-square-kilometre (95 sq mi) municipality existed from 1838 until its dissolution in 1964. The area is now part of Molde Municipality and Rauma Municipality in the traditional district of Romsdal. The administrative centre was located on the small island of Veøya where the Old Veøy Church is located (the island was also the namesake of the municipality).

Prior to its dissolution in 1964, the 247.1-square-kilometre (95.4 sq mi) municipality was the 329th largest by area out of the 689 municipalities in Norway. Veøy Municipality was the 406th most populous municipality in Norway with a population of about 2,208. The municipality's population density was 8.9 inhabitants per square kilometre (23/sq mi) and its population had decreased by 8.2% over the previous 10-year period.

== General information ==
The parish of Veøy was established as a municipality on 1 January 1838 (see formannskapsdistrikt law). In the fall of 1838, the western district of Veøy Municipality was separated from Veøy to become the new Vestnes Municipality.

During the 1960s, there were many municipal mergers across Norway due to the work of the Schei Committee. On 1 January 1964, Veøy Municipality ceased to exist and its area were divided into two.

- The islands of Sekken and Veøya as well as the Nesjestranda district on the mainland north of the Langfjorden (with a total population of 756) were incorporated into the newly enlarged Molde Municipality.
- The remainder of Veøy on the south side of the Langfjorden and the Vågstranda area (population: 1,400) were merged with Eid Municipality, Grytten Municipality, Hen Municipality, and Voll Municipality to form the new Rauma Municipality.

=== Name ===
The municipality (originally the parish) is named after the island of Veøya (Old Norse: Véøy) since the first Veøy Church was built there and it was the religious center of the whole Romsdal region. The first element part is vé which means "sanctuary" (Vé is a word that comes from German paganism). The last element is øy which means "island". Thus, the name refers to it being a holy island. Historically, the name of the municipality was spelled Veø. On 3 November 1917, a royal resolution changed the spelling of the name of the municipality to Veøy.

=== Churches ===
The Church of Norway had three parishes (sokn) within Veøy Municipality. At the time of the municipal dissolution, it was part of the Veøy prestegjeld and the Ytre Romsdal prosti (deanery) in the Diocese of Nidaros.

Churches in Veøy Municipality
Parish (sokn)	Church name	Location of the church	Year built
Veøy	Veøy Church	Sølsnes	1907
Veøy	Sekken Church	Sekken	1908
Veøy	Old Veøy Church	Veøya	c. 1200
Holm	Holm Church	Holm (east of Åfarnes)	1907
Holm	Rødven Church	Rødven	1907
Holm	Rødven Stave Church	Rødven	c. 1200
Vågstranda	Vågstranda Church	Vågstranda	1870

== Geography ==
The municipality was located around the great Romsdalsfjorden. Vestnes Municipality and Tresfjord Municipality were to the west, Bolsøy Municipality was to the north, and Nesset Municipality and Eresfjord og Vistdal Municipality were to the east. Hen Municipality, Grytten Municipality, Eid Municipality, and Voll Municipality were all located to the south of Veøy Municipality. The highest point in the municipality was the 1,263-metre (4,144 ft) tall mountain Prosten, on the border with Voll Municipality.

== History ==
=== Landslide ===
Just before 8:00 p.m. on 22 February 1756, a landslide with a volume of 12,000,000 to 15,000,000 cubic metres (16,000,000 to 20,000,000 cubic yards) — the largest known landslide in Norway in historic time — traveled at high speed from a height of 400 metres (1,312 ft) on the side of the mountain Tjellafjellet into the Langfjorden 25 kilometres (16 mi) from Veøy. The slide generated three megatsunamis in the immediate area in the Langfjorden and the Eresfjorden with heights of 40 to 50 metres (131 to 164 ft). Damaging waves reached Veøya, where, although reduced in size, they washed inland 20 metres (66 ft) above normal flood levels.

== Government ==
While it existed, Veøy Municipality was responsible for primary education (through 10th grade), outpatient health services, senior citizen services, welfare and other social services, zoning, economic development, and municipal roads and utilities. The municipality was governed by a municipal council of directly elected representatives. The mayor was indirectly elected by a vote of the municipal council. The municipality was under the jurisdiction of the Frostating Court of Appeal.

=== Municipal council ===
The municipal council (Heradsstyre) of Veøy Municipality was made up of 21 representatives that were elected to four year terms. The tables below show the historical composition of the council by political party.

Veøy heradsstyre 1959–1963
Party name (in Nynorsk)	Number of representatives
Labour Party (Arbeidarpartiet)	6
Joint List(s) of Non-Socialist Parties (Borgarlege Felleslister)	15
Total number of members:	21

Veøy heradsstyre 1955–1959
Party name (in Nynorsk)	Number of representatives
Labour Party (Arbeidarpartiet)	9
Christian Democratic Party (Kristeleg Folkeparti)	2
Liberal Party (Venstre)	1
List of workers, fishermen, and small farmholders (Arbeidarar, fiskarar, småbrukarar liste)	1
Joint List(s) of Non-Socialist Parties (Borgarlege Felleslister)	8
Total number of members:	21

Veøy heradsstyre 1951–1955
Party name (in Nynorsk)	Number of representatives
Labour Party (Arbeidarpartiet)	6
Joint List(s) of Non-Socialist Parties (Borgarlege Felleslister)	14
Total number of members:	20

Veøy heradsstyre 1947–1951
Party name (in Nynorsk)	Number of representatives
Labour Party (Arbeidarpartiet)	4
List of workers, fishermen, and small farmholders (Arbeidarar, fiskarar, småbrukarar liste)	1
Joint List(s) of Non-Socialist Parties (Borgarlege Felleslister)	15
Total number of members:	20

Veøy heradsstyre 1945–1947
Party name (in Nynorsk)	Number of representatives
Joint List(s) of Non-Socialist Parties (Borgarlege Felleslister)	4
Local List(s) (Lokale lister)	16
Total number of members:	20

Veøy heradsstyre 1937–1941*
Party name (in Nynorsk)	Number of representatives
Labour Party (Arbeidarpartiet)	4
Joint List(s) of Non-Socialist Parties (Borgarlege Felleslister)	16
Total number of members:	20
Note: Due to the German occupation of Norway during World War II, no elections were held for new municipal councils until after the war ended in 1945.

=== Mayors ===
The mayor (Nynorsk: ordførar) of Veøy Municipality was the political leader of the municipality and the chairperson of the municipal council. The following people have held this position:

- 1838–1842: Ole Olsen Nesje
- 1843–1845: Rev. Tybring
- 1846–1847: Jon Bjerke
- 1848–1852: Christian Frost
- 1852–1853: Knud I. Dalsæt
- 1854–1855: Jørgen Olafsen
- 1856–1859: Knud I. Dalset
- 1860–1861: Jørgen Olafsen
- 1862–1874: Rasmus Rolfsen Arnet
- 1874–1888: Jørgen Olafsen
- 1888–1889: Anders L. Dalset
- 1890–1899: Ole H. Holm
- 1899–1908: O. Ødegaard
- 1908–1911: Erik Flovik
- 1911–1919: Lars Ottestad
- 1920–1931: Nils Nesje
- 1931–1934: P.A. Kjølset
- 1934–1937: Nils Nesje
- 1937–1941: Peder Vik
- 1941–1945: David Reistad
- 1945–1955: Leif Ottestad
- 1955–1964: Peder Mork (KrF)

== See also ==
- List of former municipalities of Norway
