= Romsdal Museum =

The Romsdal Museum
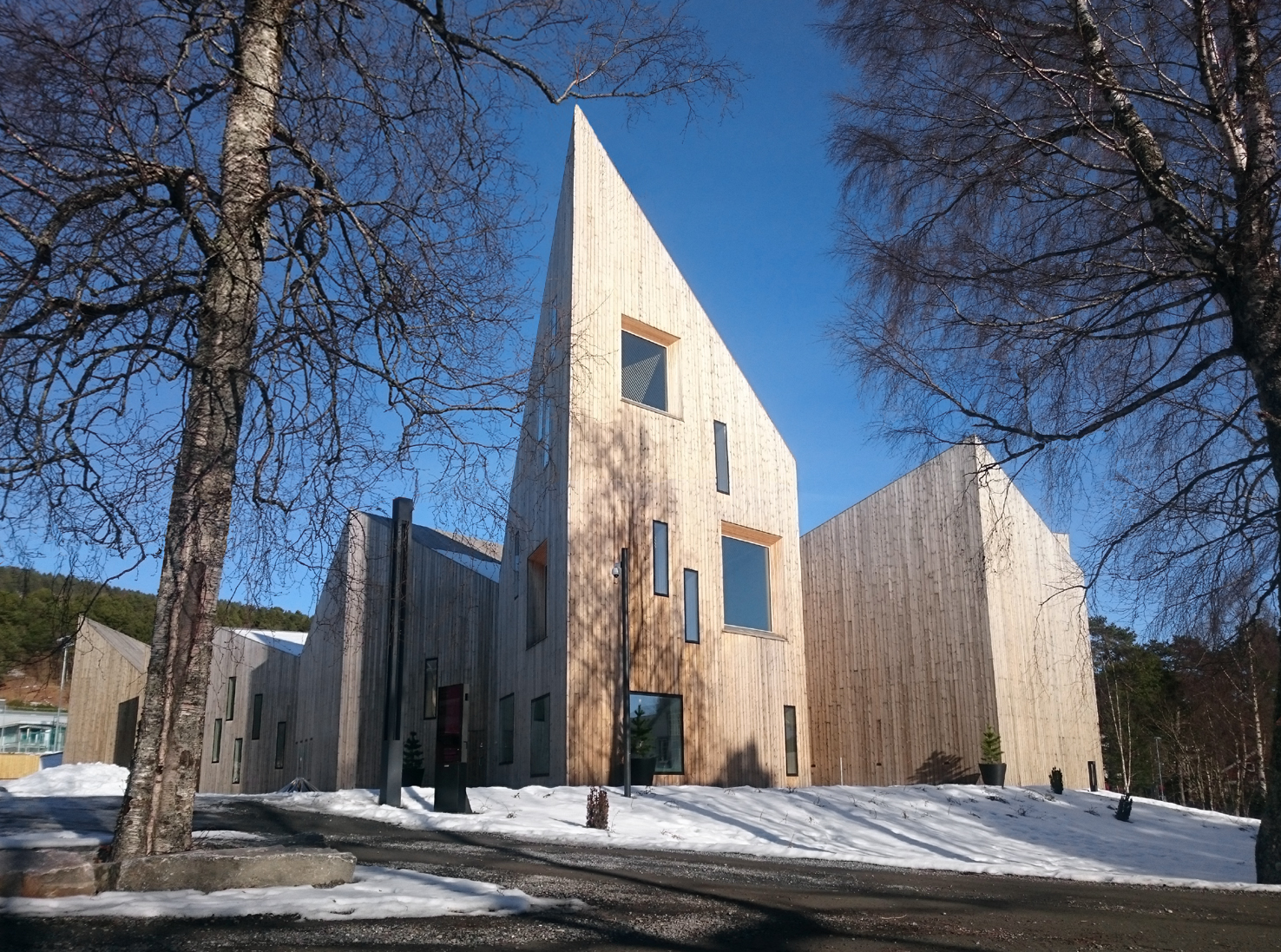
- "Krona" the main building at Romsdalsmuseet
- Location: Molde, Norway
- Coordinates: 62°44′22.91″N 7°9′3.25″E
- Type: Folk Museum
- Founder: Peter Tønder Solemdal
- Website: Official website

The Romsdal Museum (Norwegian: Romsdalsmuseet) is a museum in the Romsdal district of Møre og Romsdal county, Norway. The museum is based in Molde Municipality, but it has sites all over the region.

== History ==
The museum was founded by Peter Tønder Solemdal (1876-1963) in 1912, and is one of the largest and most extensive folk museums in Norway. In addition, the museum has a library and several archives for prints, text, and photographs. In 1928, the museum was opened to the public.

In the middle of the field is the old "Isdammen", previously used for ice production. The area also contains a lake, which is very popular with local birds, and a stage that is used during Moldejazz, the Molde International Jazz Festival. Several houses are included in a guided tour: Tresfjord Cottage, Holt Cottage, Hammervoll house, and Erik Pålgarden Garden.

Krona is the Romsdal Museum's new museum building. In addition to the art collection and archives of historical photographs, the building houses a permanent exhibition that tells about living conditions in the region through different times.

== Departments ==
- Bud Museum - Ergan Coastal Fort - restored German coastal fort from World War II with command centre, cannon positions, sickbay and water reservoir built into the rock.
- Old Veøy Church and Vicarage - dates to the late 12th century, when the island of Veøya was an important trading center.
- Museum of Apparel in Isfjorden - Oddfred Tokles konfeksjonsfabrikk, a clothing factory, was in operation from 1938 to 1982, and displays an authentic 1960s environment. It is located in Isfjorden in Rauma Municipality.
- Fishing Museum on the island of Hjertøya - collection of 15 buildings, recreating the maritime culture of a coastal community in the 1700s and 1800s. It is located on the island of Hjertøya in the Molde archipelago in Molde Municipality. It is serviced by water taxi from the town of Molde.
- Open-air museum at the former Reknes farm in Molde - collection of more than 40 buildings (barns, farm houses, stables, workshops, etc.) from the Romsdal region, dating from the 16th to the 20th centuries. recreated city street shows what most of the city looked like prior to the 1916 fire. The indoor collection reflects regional life and findings from Mesolithic times through the German occupation in World War II.
- Vicarage in Nesset Municipality - parsonage in Eidsvåg which was the childhood home of national poet and Nobel laureate Bjørnstjerne Bjørnson. It is the site of Bjørnsonfestivalen, an annual international literature festival that has been held in August since 1992. It was founded by the author Knut Ødegård in connection with the 250-year anniversary Molde.
- Løvikremma Farm Museum on Gossen in Aukra Municipality - traditional coastal farm dating from the end of the 19th century, with dwelling houses, barn, traditional raised food store, and peat shed.

== Gallery ==
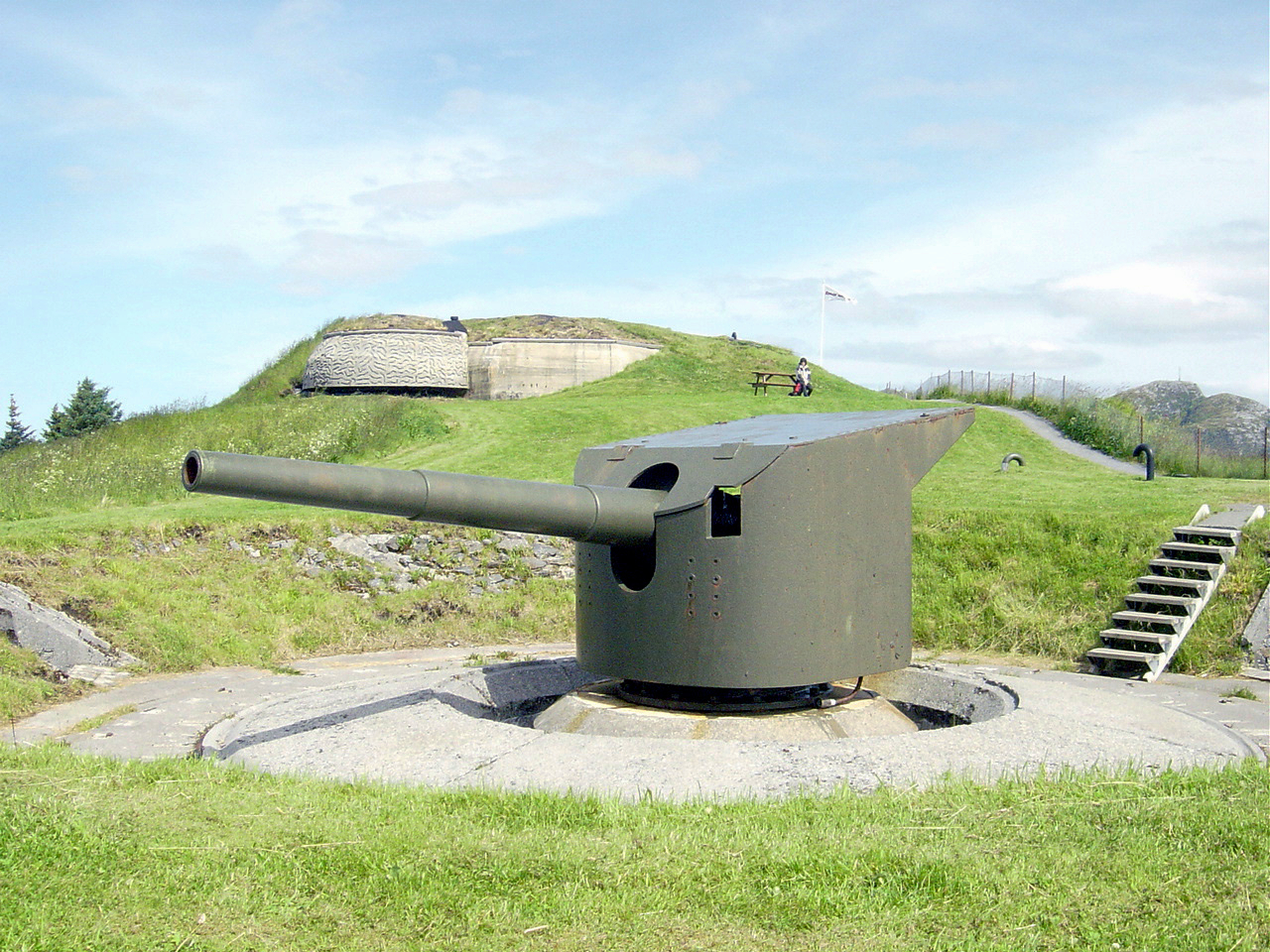
Bud Museum - Ergan Coastal Fort

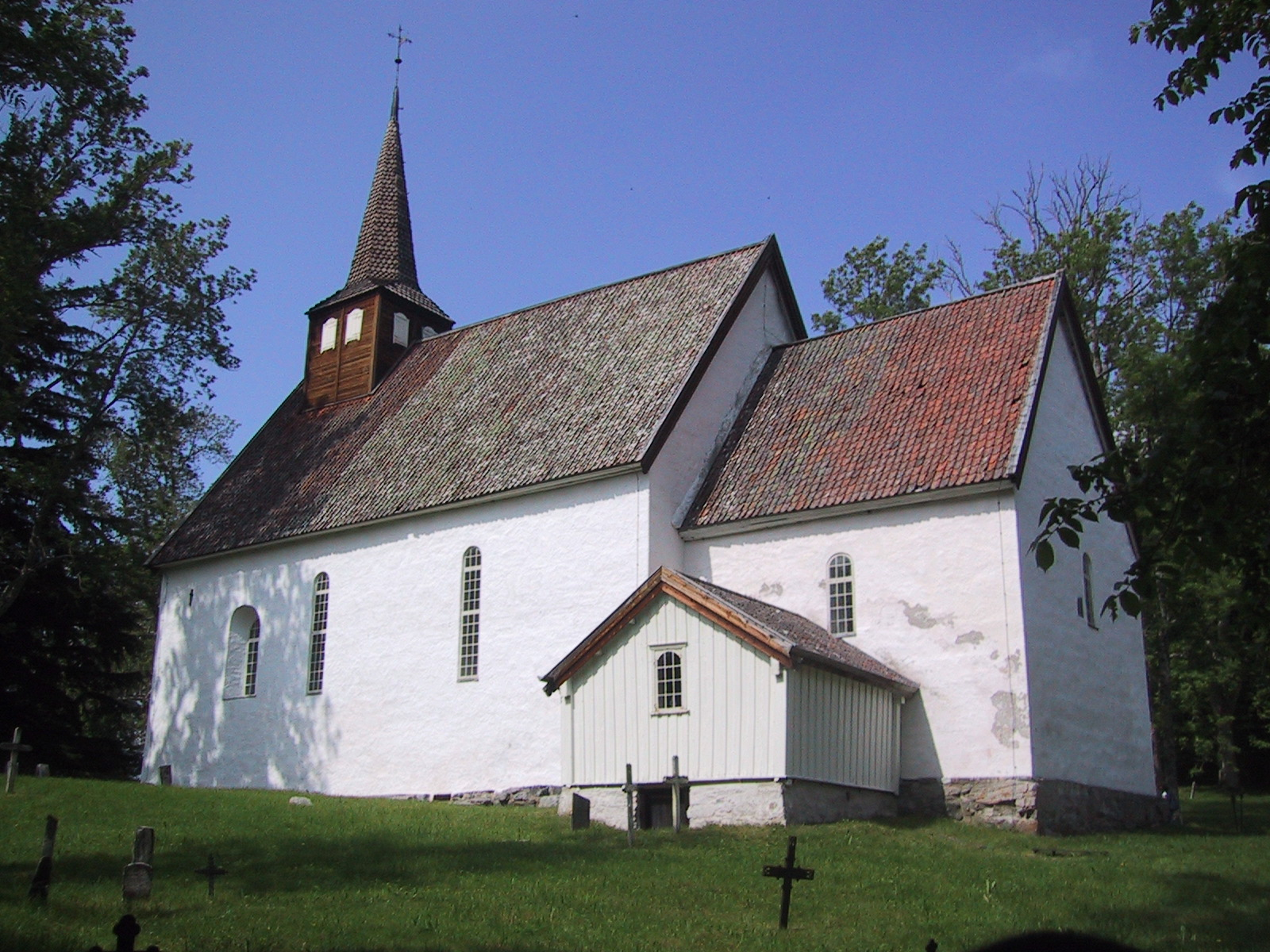
Medieval Veøy Church

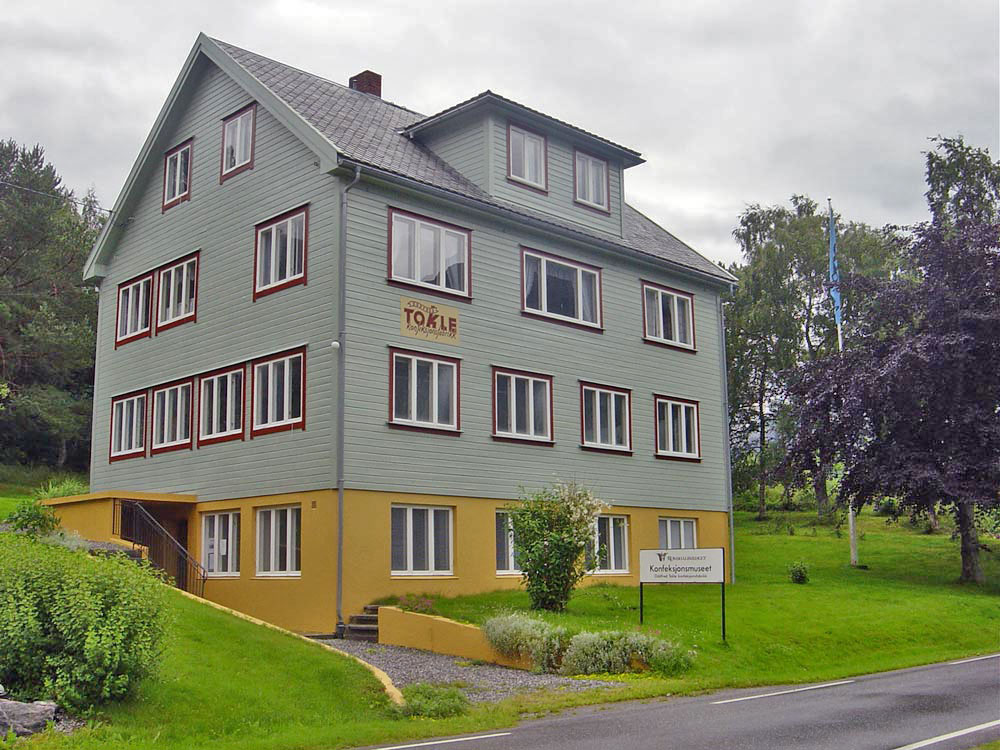
Museum of Apparel in Isfjorden

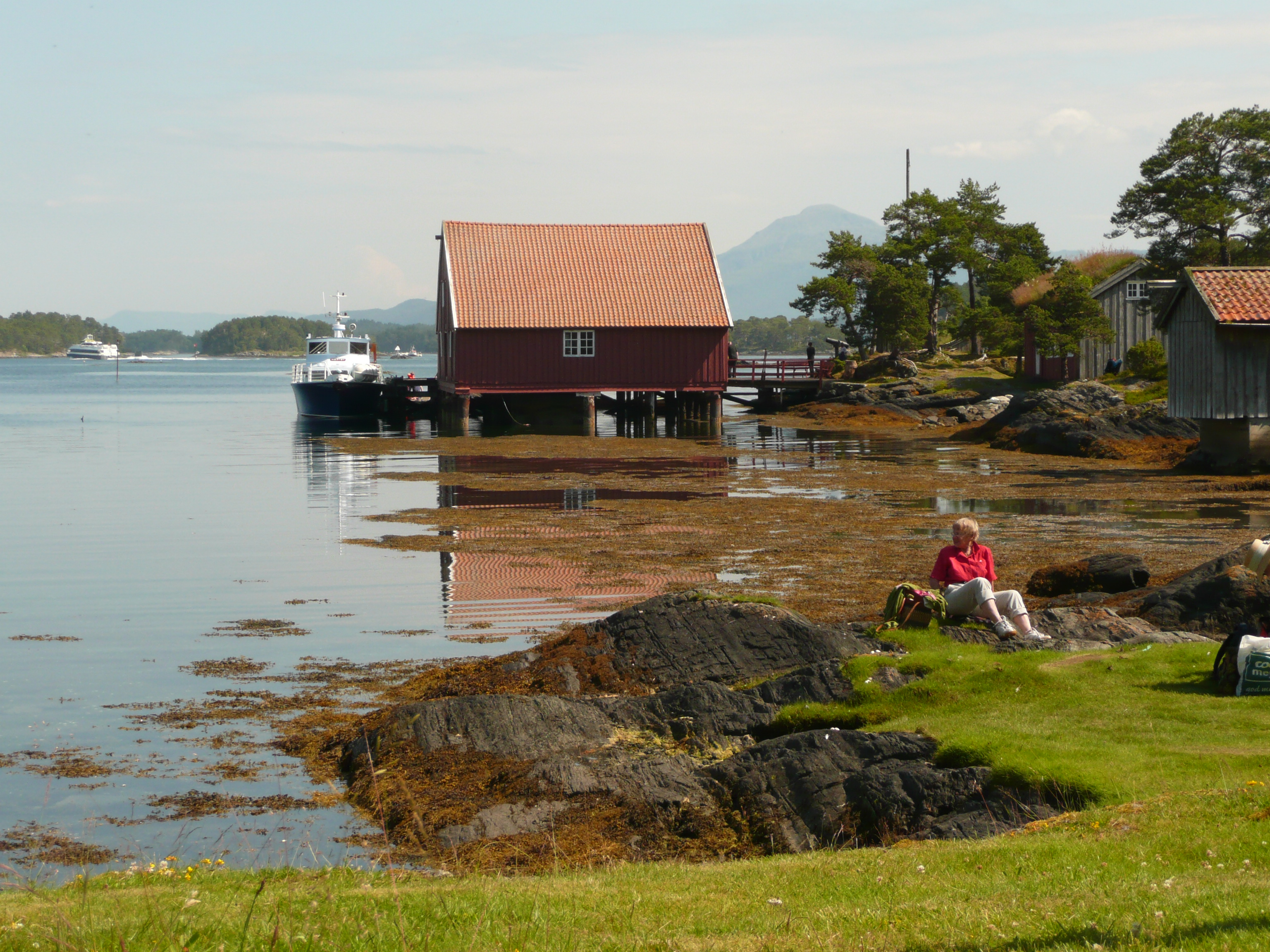
Fisheries museum on Hjertøya island

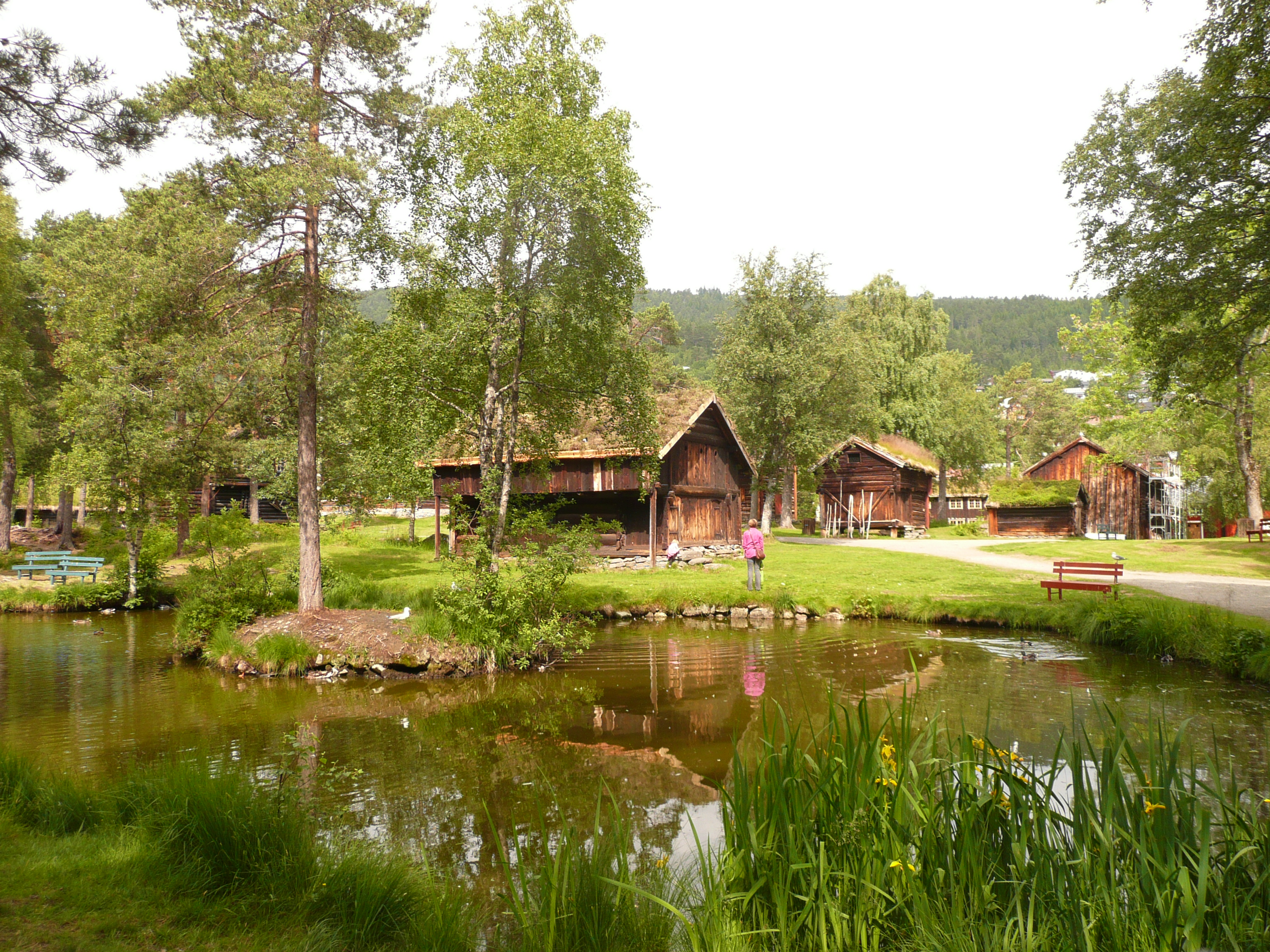
Open-air museum in Molde

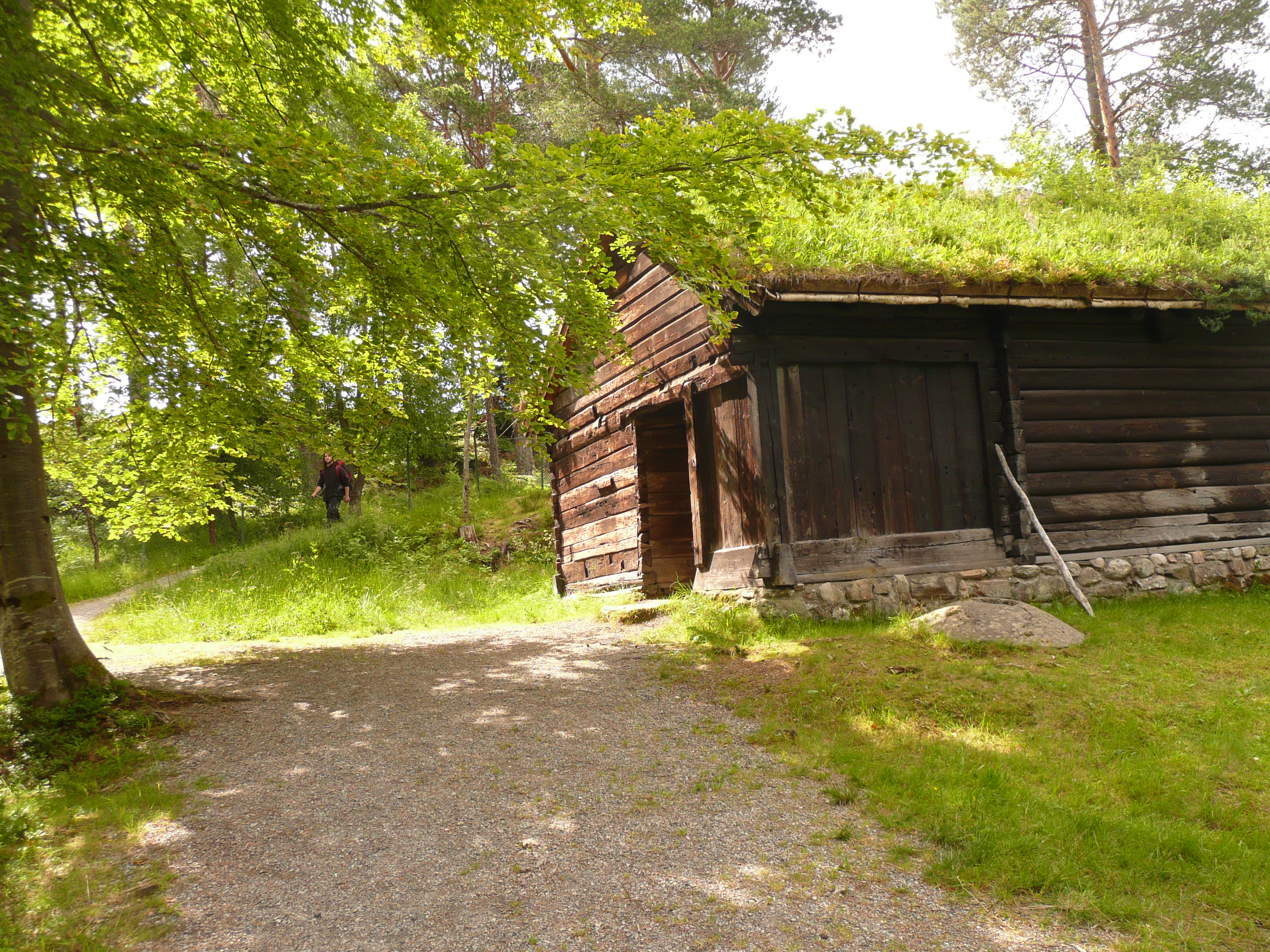
Traditional Norwegian house in Molde

== See also ==
- History of Molde
