= Sekken =

Island in Møre og Romsdal, Norway

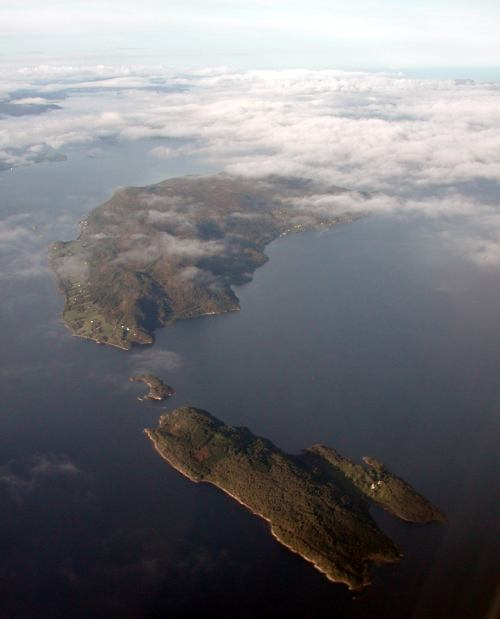
- View of Sekken (back) and Veøya (front)
- Interactive map of Sekken

Geography
- Location: Møre og Romsdal, Norway
- Coordinates: 62.6598°N 7.2897°E
- Area: 18.7 km^{2} (7.2 sq mi)
- Length: 8.5 km (5.28 mi)
- Width: 3.6 km (2.24 mi)
- Highest elevation: 304 m (997 ft)
- Highest point: Tranhaugen

Administration
- Norway
- County: Møre og Romsdal
- Municipality: Molde Municipality

Sekken is an island in Molde Municipality, Møre og Romsdal county, Norway. The island is located in Romsdal Fjord, at the mouth of the Langfjorden. The island lies about 4 kilometres (2.5 mi) south of the island of Bolsøya and about 1 kilometre (0.62 mi) west of the historic island of Veøya.

== Transportation ==
There are no road connections to the 18.7-square-kilometre (7.2 sq mi) island except for a ferry connection between the town of Molde and Seterneset on the island. The proposed Langfjord Tunnel includes a possible branch off the main tunnel under the Langfjorden that would connect Sekken to the mainland by subsea road tunnel.

== See also ==
- List of islands of Norway
