= Old Veøy Church =

Former church in Møre og Romsdal, Norway

- Veøy gamle kyrkje
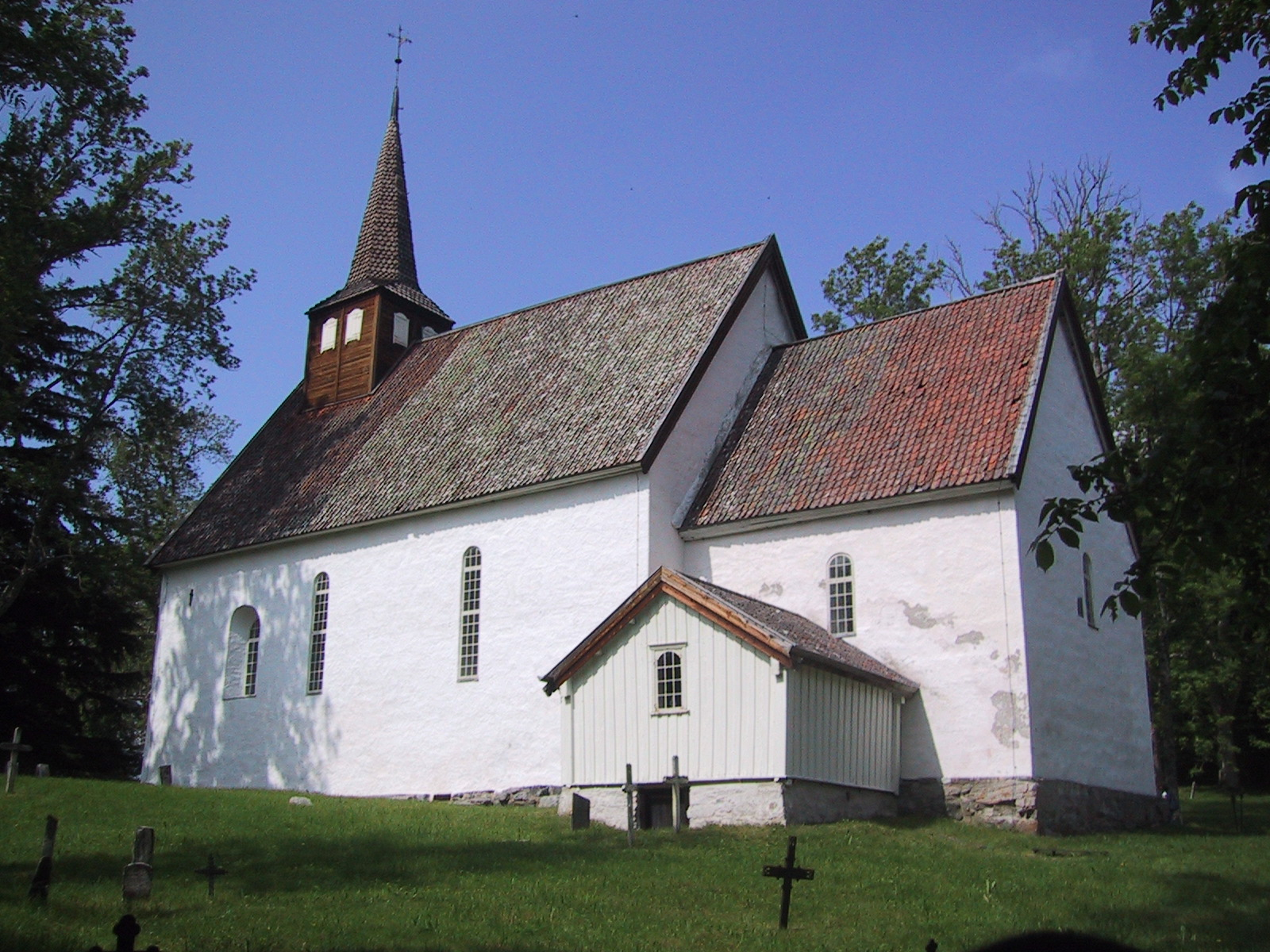
- View of the church
- Old Veøy Church
- 62°40′28″N 7°25′40″E
- Location: Molde Municipality, Møre og Romsdal
- Country: Norway
- Denomination: Church of Norway
- Previous denomination: Catholic Church
- Churchmanship: Evangelical Lutheran

History
- Status: Parish church
- Founded: 11th century
- Consecrated: c. 1200

Architecture
- Functional status: Preserved museum
- Architectural type: Long church
- Style: Romanesque
- Completed: c. 1200 (826 years ago)
- Closed: 1907

Specifications
- Capacity: 400
- Materials: Stone

Administration
- Diocese: Møre bispedømme
- Deanery: Molde domprosti
- Parish: Røvik og Veøy
- Norwegian Cultural Heritage Site
- Type: Church
- Status: Automatically protected
- ID: 107967

Old Veøy Church (Norwegian: Veøy gamle kyrkje) is a former parish church of the Church of Norway in Molde Municipality in Møre og Romsdal county, Norway. It is located on the small island of Veøya which lies in the Romsdalsfjorden. It was the main church for the Veøy parish until its closing in 1901. The church was a part of the Molde domprosti (arch-deanery) in the Diocese of Møre and now it is part of the Romsdal Museum. The white, stone church was built in a long church style in the 1200s by an unknown architect. The church seats about 400 people.

== History ==
Tradition says that there have been seven churches located all over the island of Veøya, some of which may have dated back to the 8th century. Since the Viking Age, the whole Romsdalsfjorden was quite important as a transportation route and the island of Veøya was centrally located, making it quite important as well. The island of Veøya had a market town on it and many residents. The only church remaining on the island is the Old Veøy Church which has been the only church on the island for the last several hundred years.

The earliest existing historical records of this church on Veøya date back to the year 1308, but it was not new that year. The first church on Veøy was probably a wooden stave church that was built during the mid-11th century. That church was torn down around the year 1200 when the present church (now known as the Old Veøy Church) was built. The Old Veøy Church is a Romanesque long church built of stone and covered with white plaster. The church is constructed out of locally quarried soapstone and marble.

The church was designated as the main church for the parish of Veøy starting in 1480 (in 1838, the parish became Veøy Municipality). In 1589, the parish had annex churches located in Bolsøy, Rødven, Kleive, Vestnes, Tresfjord, Vistdal, and Eresfjord. The church has been renovated and expanded several times over the centuries including in 1631, 1656, 1722, and a major refurbishment from 1760-1790.

In 1814, this church served as an election church (Norwegian: valgkirke). Together with more than 300 other parish churches across Norway, it was a polling station for elections to the 1814 Norwegian Constituent Assembly which wrote the Constitution of Norway. This was Norway's first national elections. Each church parish was a constituency that elected people called "electors" who later met together in each county to elect the representatives for the assembly that was to meet at Eidsvoll Manor later that year.

In 1832, and again in 1858, the church was renovated. From the mid-1600s to the late-1800s, the island of Veøya had lost is great importance and few people were actually living on the island. In 1901, a royal decree was handed down that discontinued the church in active use. The decree authorized the construction of a new Veøy Church on the mainland so that residents of the parish could more easily reach the church. In 1907, the new Veøy Church was completed and put into use. After that, the old church was renamed "Old Veøy Church" and it was preserved as a historic site. Since 1907, the church has not been in regular use, but is periodically used for special occasions. In the 1950s, one family still owned homes on the island, but they were only used for vacations, so there were no longer any permanent residents living on the island. From 1976-1978, the church was refurbished by the Norwegian Directorate for Cultural Heritage. Since 1990, the church has been jointly owned by the parish, the municipality, and the Romsdal Museum. From 1990-1992, the church and surroundings were examined archaeologically.

Jonas Lied donated one-third of his wealth to the renovation of the old church.

== Media gallery ==
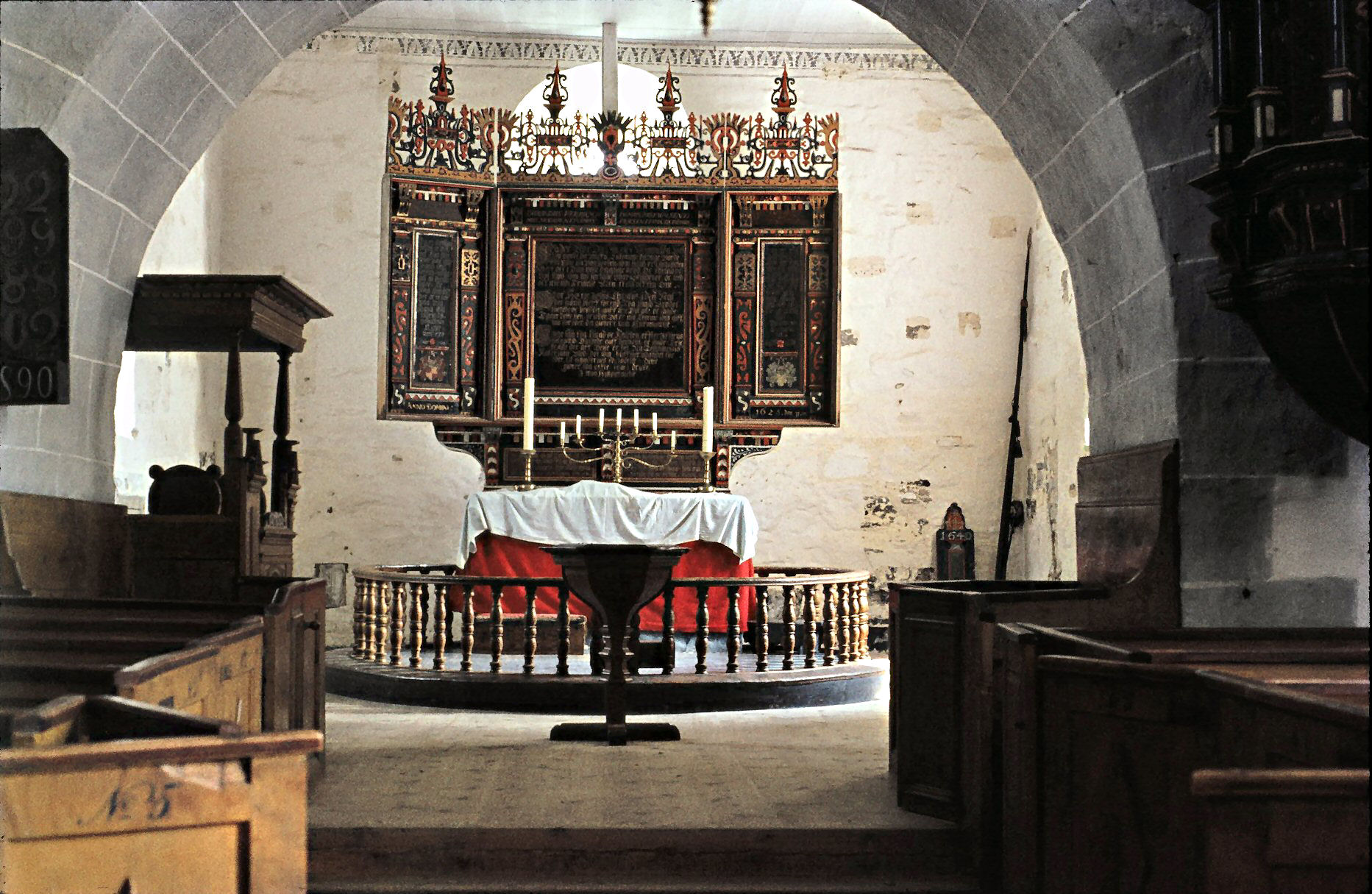
Interior

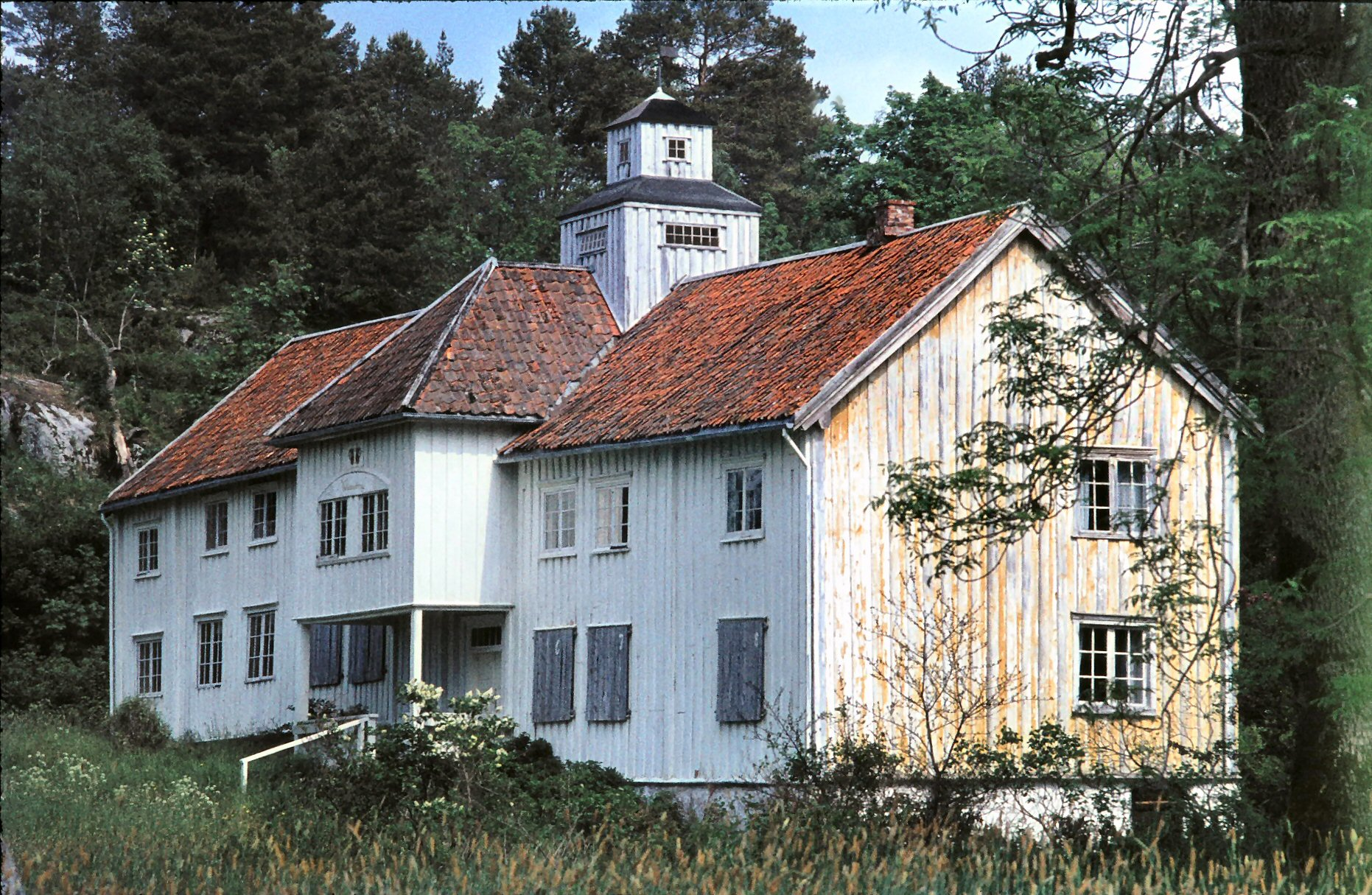
Vicars Residence next to the church

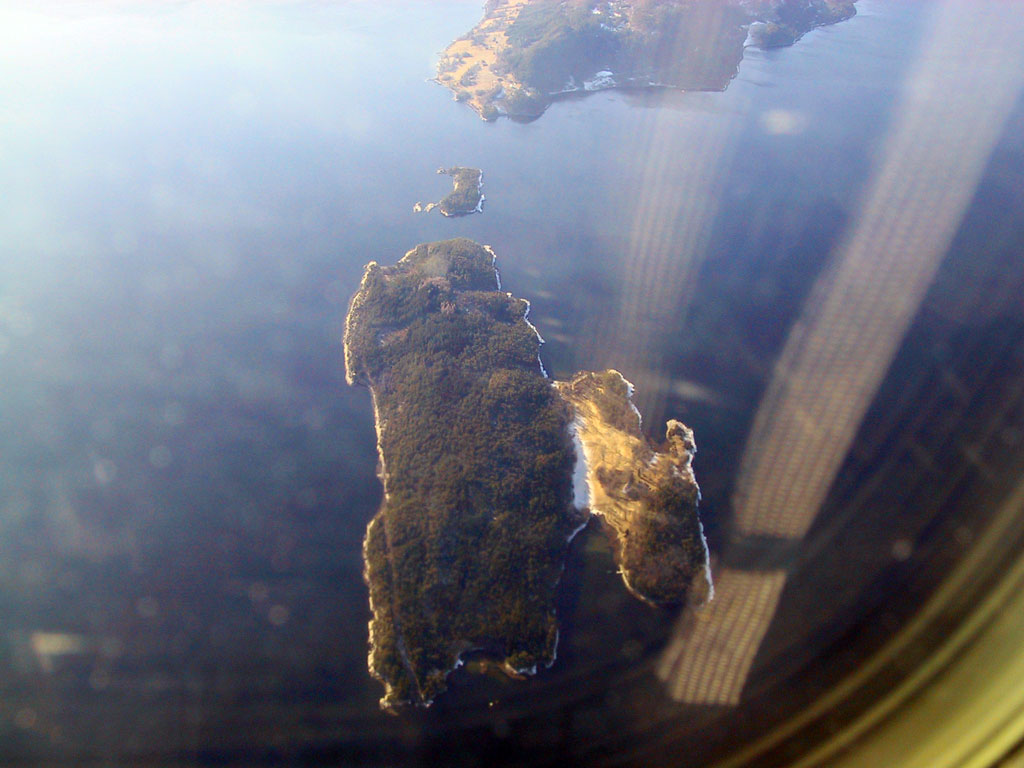
View of the church on the island

== See also ==
- List of churches in Møre
