= Veøy Church =

Church in Møre og Romsdal, Norway

- Veøy kyrkje
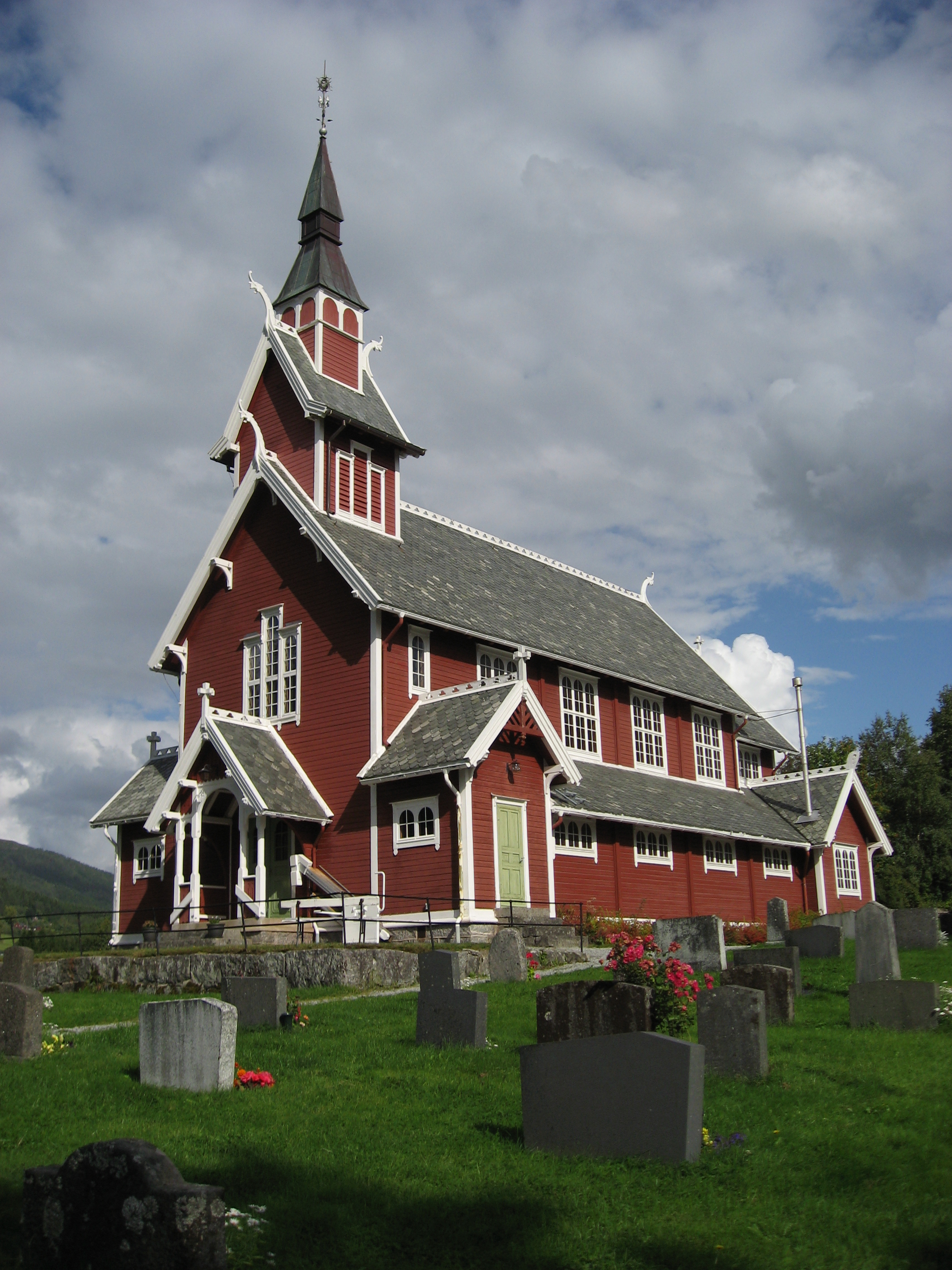
- View of the church
- Veøy Church
- 62°41′08″N 7°27′15″E
- Location: Molde Municipality, Møre og Romsdal
- Country: Norway
- Denomination: Church of Norway
- Churchmanship: Evangelical Lutheran

History
- Status: Parish church
- Founded: 1907
- Consecrated: 1907

Architecture
- Functional status: Active
- Architect: Karl Norum
- Architectural type: Long church
- Style: Dragestil
- Completed: 1907 (119 years ago)

Specifications
- Capacity: 212
- Materials: Wood

Administration
- Diocese: Møre bispedømme
- Deanery: Molde domprosti
- Parish: Røvik og Veøy
- Norwegian Cultural Heritage Site
- Type: Church
- Status: Listed
- ID: 85828

Veøy Church (Norwegian: Veøy kyrkje) is a parish church of the Church of Norway in Molde Municipality in Møre og Romsdal county, Norway. It is located in the village of Sølsnes. It is the main church for the Røvik og Veøy parish which is part of the Molde domprosti (arch-deanery) in the Diocese of Møre. The red, wooden church was built in a long church design in the dragestil style in 1907 by the architect Karl Norum. The church seats about 212 people.

== History ==
Towards the end of the 19th century, the island of Veøya had long since been depopulated, with the exception of the clergy family and its household, so it was difficult to maintain a main parish church such as the Old Veøy Church on the island. In 1901, it was decided to take the island's medieval church out of use as a parish church and move the church site to Sølsnes on the mainland nearby. The new church was designed by the architect Karl Norum. The new building was completed and consecrated in 1907.

== Media gallery ==
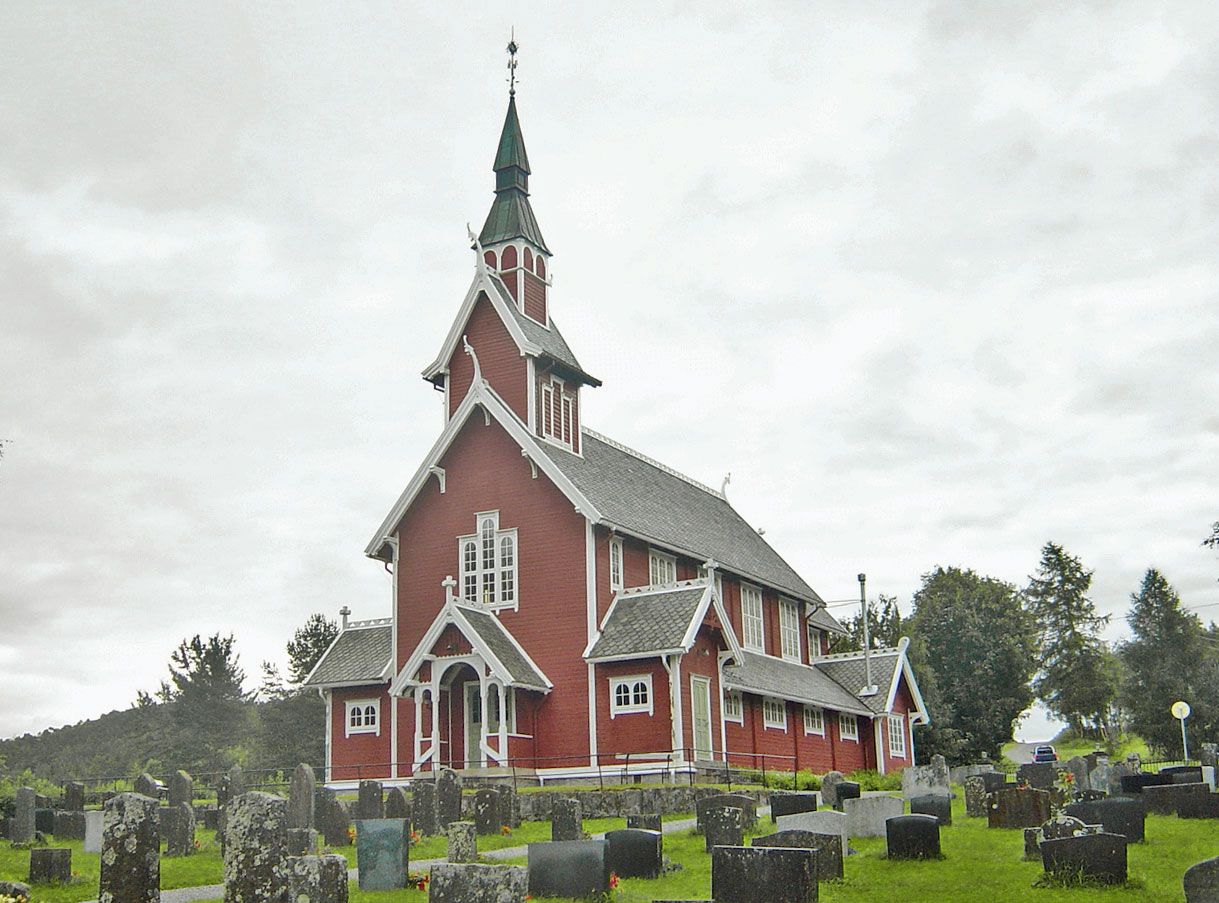
Front view

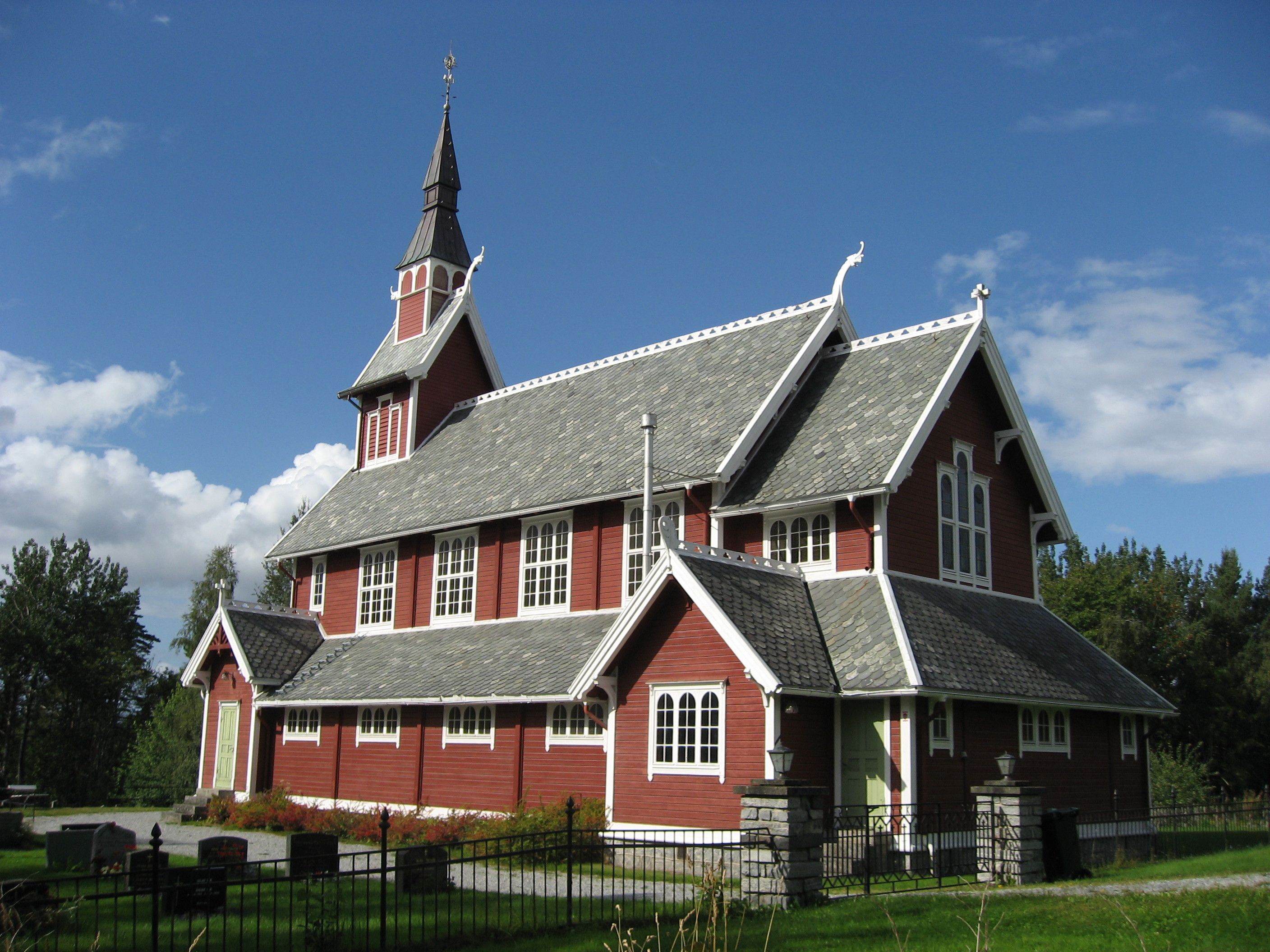
Exterior from east

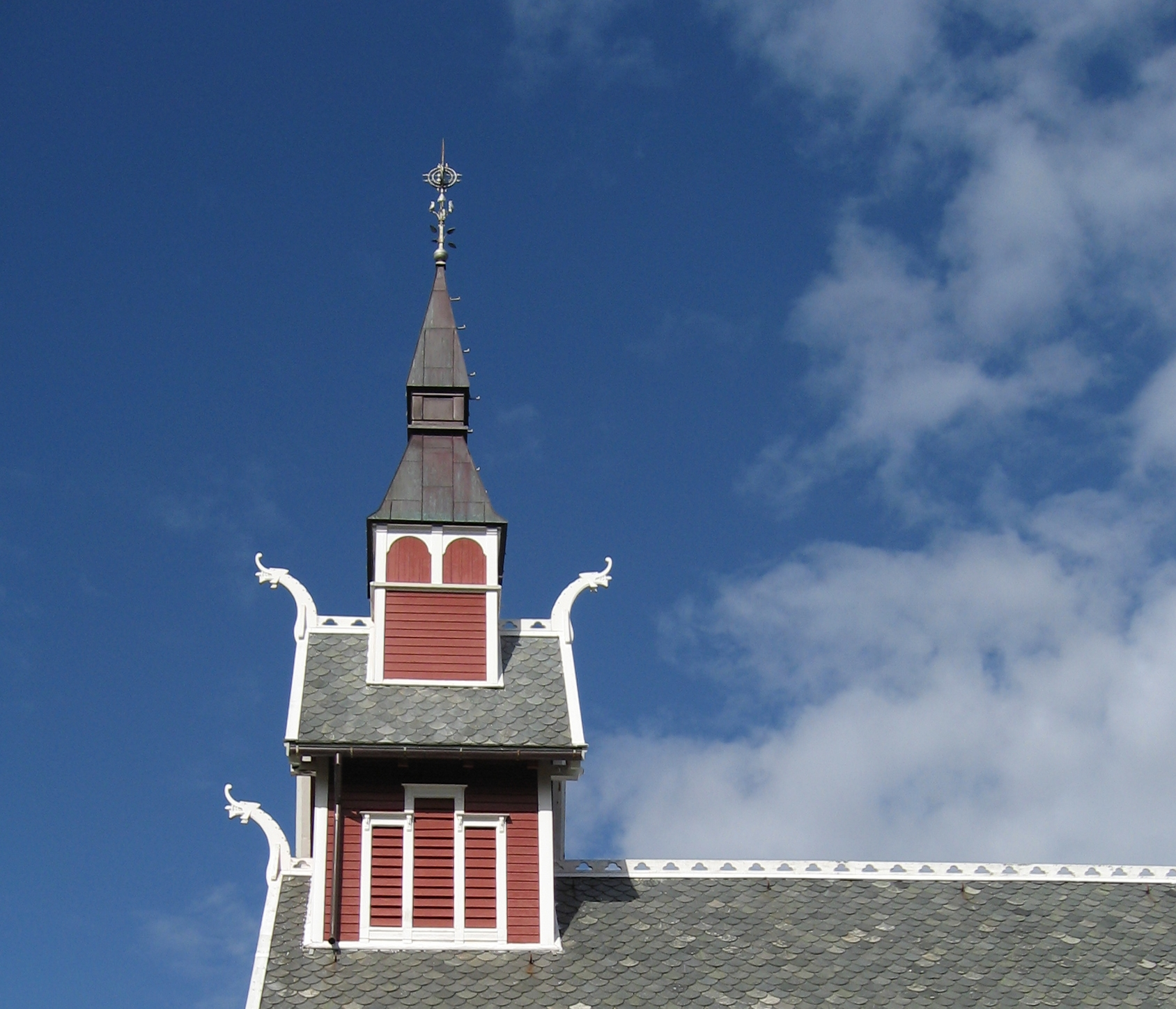
Close up of the tower

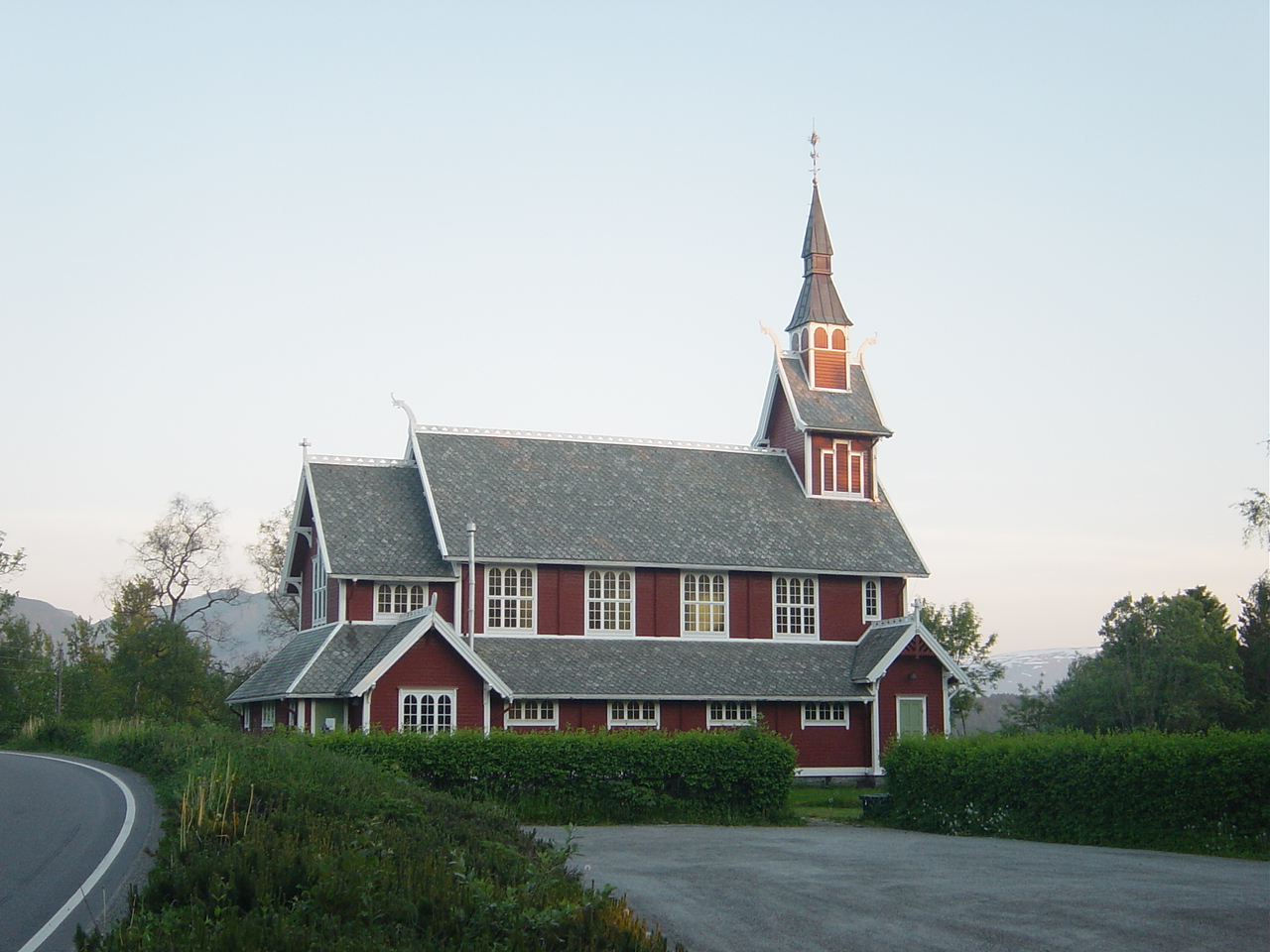
Side view

== See also ==
- List of churches in Møre
