= Veøya =

Island in Møre og Romsdal, Norway

Veøya Veøy (historic)
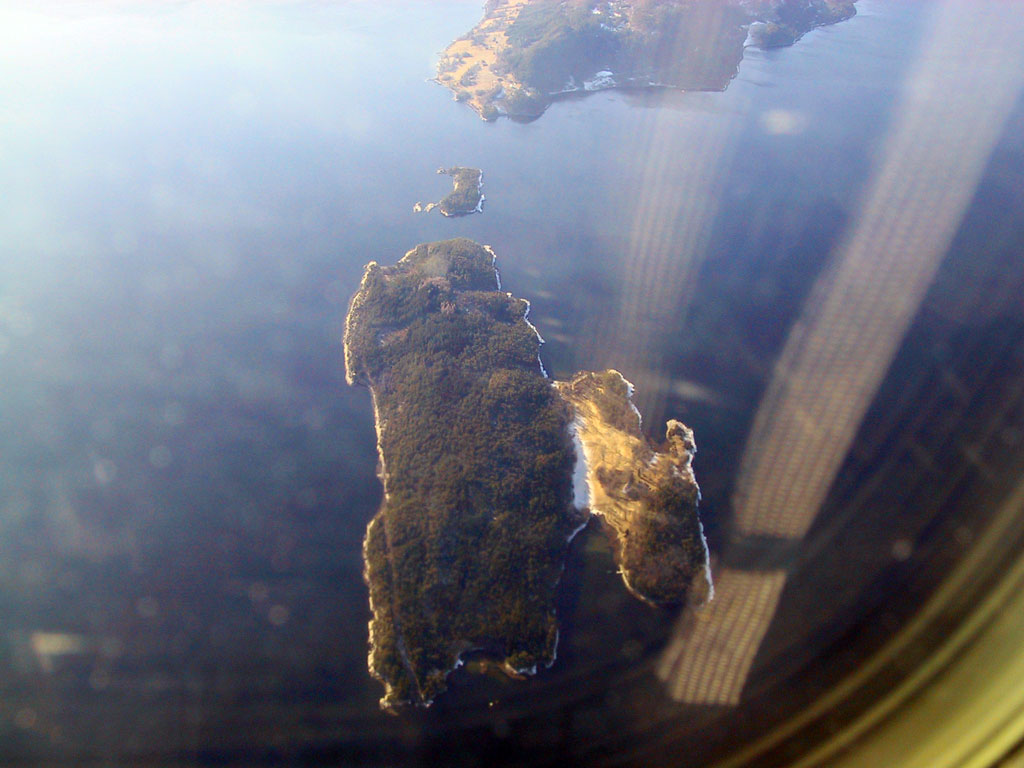
- View of the island
- Interactive map of Veøya; Veøy (historic)

Geography
- Location: Møre og Romsdal, Norway
- Coordinates: 62.6706°N 7.4248°E
- Area: 6 km^{2} (2.3 sq mi)
- Length: 2 km (1.2 mi)
- Width: 760 m (2490 ft)
- Highest elevation: 76 m (249 ft)

Administration
- Norway
- County: Møre og Romsdal
- Municipality: Molde Municipality

Veøya is an island in Molde Municipality in Møre og Romsdal county, Norway. It is located at a junction of the three main branches of Romsdal Fjord between the island of Sekken and the mainland near the village of Nesjestranda. The 6-square-kilometre (2.3 sq mi) island was the municipal center of the old Veøy Municipality. The island was Norway's first legally protected land, and the buildings on the island, including the Old Veøy Church, are now part of the Romsdal Museum.

== History ==
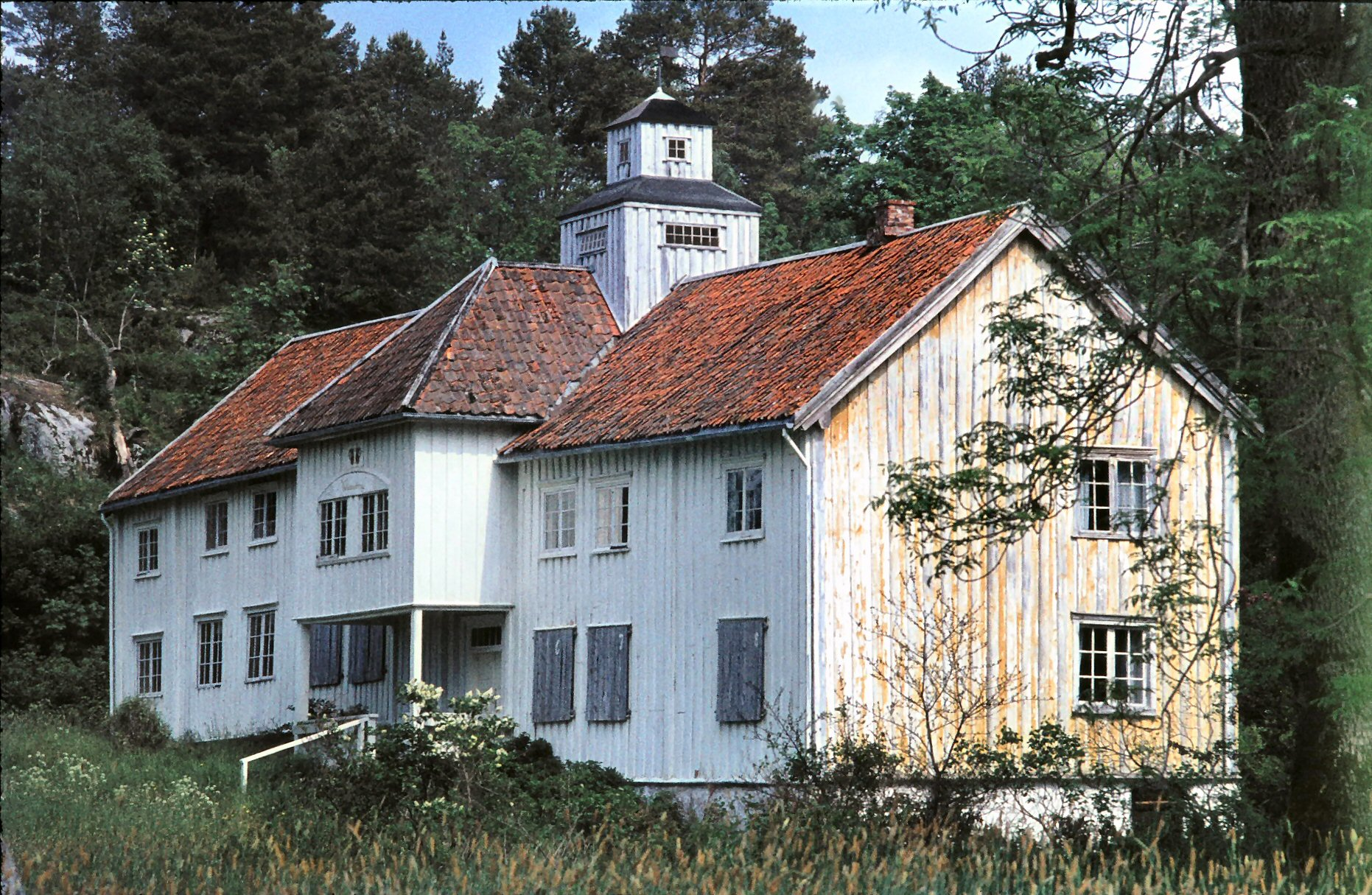
The vicar's residence in 1967

The island was a strategic location for the coastal routes during the Viking Age. The southern branch of Romsdal Fjord leads to the Romsdalen valley (and the present-day town of Åndalsnes), where important trade routes led up the valley to Lesja. From there, it followed the pilgrim trail over Dovrefjell to Trøndelag, or down the Gudbrandsdalen valley to Eastern Norway. The eastern branch led through the Langfjorden where they hauled their ships over the 5-kilometre (3.1 mi) wide, low-lying isthmus at Eidsvåg, in order to avoid the dreaded waters of Hustadvika, and then back to the shipping routes northwards to Nidaros (modern day Trondheim). To the west, past the inlet of the fjord, were the southbound routes to Bergen.

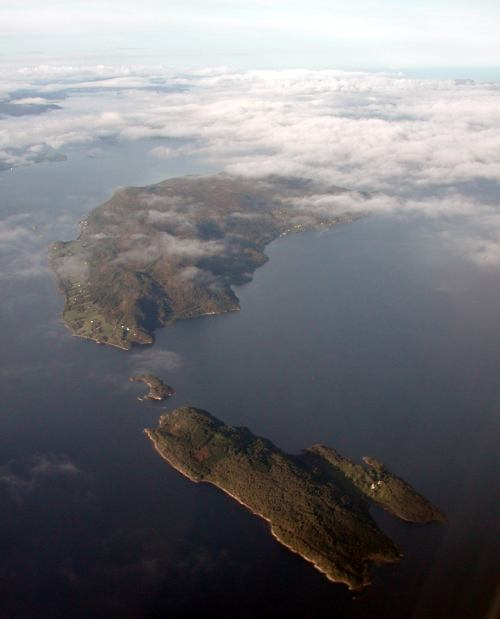
View of Veøya (closest) and Sekken (furthest) with Hangholmen in the middle

At this junction, Veøy was established as a kaupang (Old Norse for a market town), and Romsdal’s economic, administrative, and religious center. It had 300-500 permanent residents, and was an important commercial center, with a significant increase during the sailing season. The Old Veøy Church, dedicated to the Apostle Peter, is built in stone and it is the only survivor of three churches on Veøya in the Middle Ages. This church dates back to around the year 1200. It has a capacity of 400 people, and served the entire region, while the other churches served the local population.

Veøya is mentioned by Snorre Sturlason in connection with the battle of Sekken in 1162 where king Håkon Herdebrei was killed by Erling Skakke on 7 July 1162, during the Norwegian civil wars. Veøya, or nearby on the mainland, was probably the seat of Ragnvald Eysteinsson (Ragnvald Mørejarl), earl of Møre, whose son was Hrolf Ganger (Gange-Rolv).

The island became the seat for Veøy Municipality in 1838. On 1 January 1964, the islands Sekken and Veøya as well as the Nesjestranda district on the mainland, with 756 inhabitants in total, were incorporated into the neighboring Molde Municipality. The island was Norway's first legally protected land, and the buildings on the island are now part of the Romsdal museum.

== See also ==
- List of islands of Norway
