= Nesset Municipality =

Former municipality in Møre og Romsdal, Norway

Nesset Municipality Nesset kommune
- Former municipality
- Næsset herred (historic name)
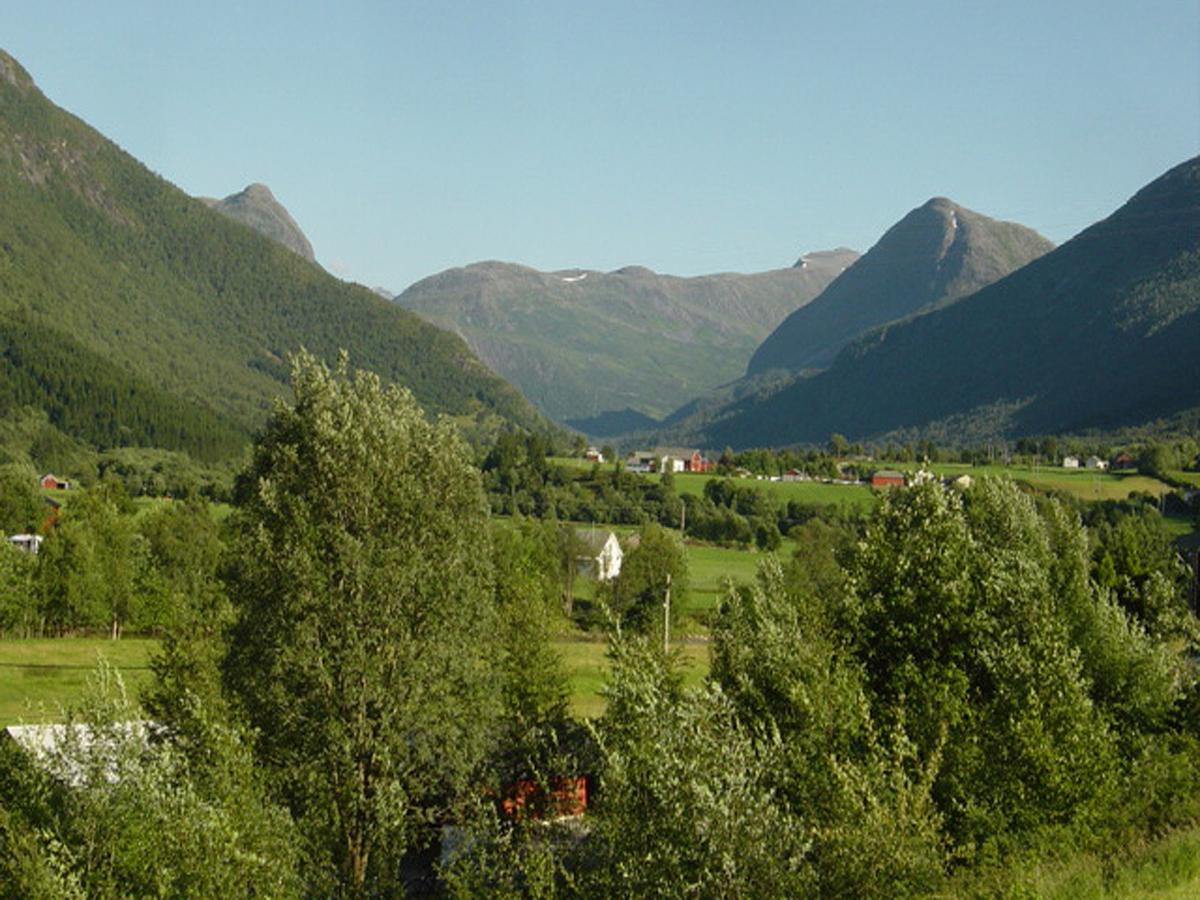
- View of Vistdal in Nesset

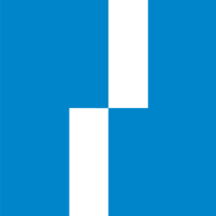
- Flag Coat of arms

- Møre og Romsdal within Norway

- Nesset within Møre og Romsdal
- Coordinates: 62°39′31″N 08°07′13″E
- Country: Norway
- County: Møre og Romsdal
- District: Romsdal
- Established: 1 Jan 1838
  - Created as: Formannskapsdistrikt
- Disestablished: 1 Jan 2020
  - Succeeded by: Molde Municipality
- Administrative centre: Eidsvåg

Government
  - Mayor (2007-2019): Rolf Jonas Hurlen (H)

Area (upon dissolution)
  - Total: 1,046.07 km^{2} (403.89 sq mi)
  - Land: 985.58 km^{2} (380.53 sq mi)
  - Water: 60.49 km^{2} (23.36 sq mi) 5.8%
  - Rank: #100 in Norway
- Highest elevation: 1,964.4 m (6,445 ft)

Population (2019)
  - Total: 2,956
  - Rank: #266 in Norway
  - Density: 2.8/km^{2} (7.3/sq mi)
  - Change (10 years): ▼ −3.9%
- Demonym: Nessetgjelding

Official language
  - Norwegian form: Nynorsk
- Time zone: UTC+01:00 (CET)
  - Summer (DST): UTC+02:00 (CEST)
- ISO 3166 code: NO-1543

Nesset is a former municipality in Møre og Romsdal county, Norway. The 1,046-square-kilometre (404 sq mi) municipality existed from 1838 until its dissolution in 2020. The area is now part of Molde Municipality in the traditional district of Romsdal. The administrative centre was the village of Eidsvåg. Other population centers included Raudsand, Boggestranda, Myklebostad, Eresfjord, and Eikesdalen.

Mardalsfossen, one of Norway's tallest waterfalls, a popular tourist attraction during the tourist season, is located in Nesset, along the shores of the lake Eikesdalsvatnet.

At the time if its dissolution in 2020, the 1,046-square-kilometre (404 sq mi) municipality was the 100th largest by area out of the 422 municipalities in Norway. Nesset Municipality was the 266th most populous municipality in Norway with a population of 2,956. The municipality's population density was 2.8 inhabitants per square kilometre (7.3/sq mi) and its population had decreased by 3.9% over the previous 10-year period.

== General information ==
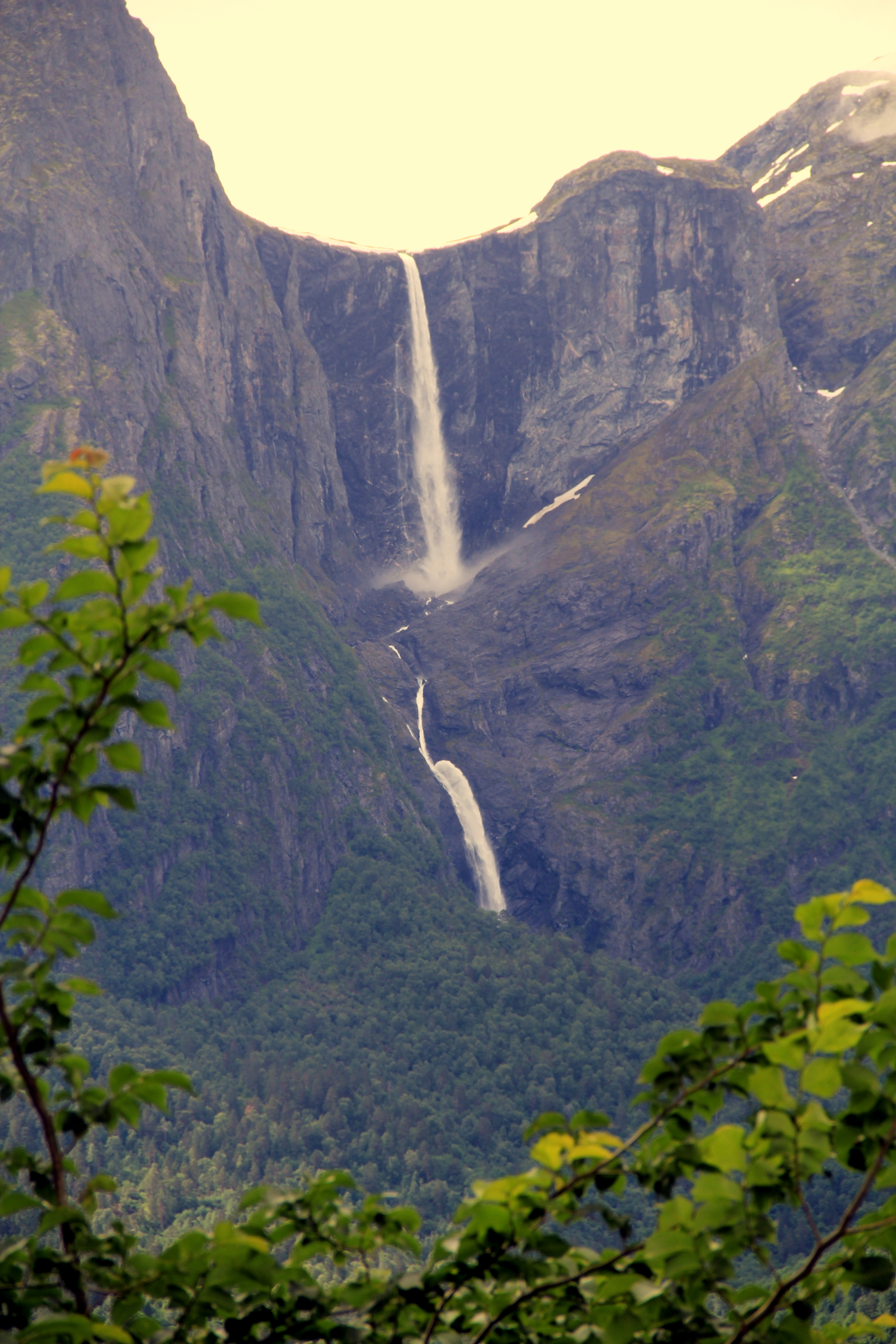
The famous Mardalsfossen waterfall –the inspiration for the municipal flag and coat of arms.

The parish of Nesset was established as a municipality on 1 January 1838 (see formannskapsdistrikt law). On 1 January 1890, Nesset Municipality was divided. All of Nesset Municipality that was located south of the Langfjorden (population: 2,155) was separated to form the new Eresfjord og Vistdal Municipality and the rest of Nesset Municipality (population: 1,706) remained as Nesset Municipality.

On 1 January 1877, the Sotnakken farm on the Romsdal peninsula (population: 19) was transferred from Nesset Municipality to the neighboring Bolsøy Municipality. Also on that date, the Tiltereidet and Meisalstranda areas (population: 212) of Tingvoll Municipality, along the west coast of the Tingvollfjorden, were transferred to Nesset Municipality. On 1 January 1890, the Bersås, Nævergjeld, Rausandhaugen, and Rausand areas (population: 101) was transferred from Tingvoll Municipality (along the Tingvollfjorden) to Nesset Municipality.

During the 1960s, there were many municipal mergers across Norway due to the work of the Schei Committee. On 1 January 1964, Eresfjord og Vistdal Municipality (population: 1,289) was merged back into Nesset Municipality (population: 2,360).

On 1 January 2020, Nesset Municipality merged with the neighboring Molde Municipality and Midsund Municipality to form a much larger Molde Municipality.

=== Name ===
The municipality (originally the parish) is named after the old Nesset farm and vicarage (Old Norse: Nøytisætr, spelled "Nødesetter" in 1520) since this is where the old Nesset Church was located. The first element is nes which means "headland". This is because the old farm is lying on a prominent headland between the Langfjorden and the Tingvollfjorden. The last element is setr or sætr which means "seter" or "mountain farm". Prior to 1889, the name was written Næsset.

=== Coat of arms ===
The coat of arms was granted on 10 March 1986 and they were in use until the municipality was dissolved on 1 January 2020. The official blazon is "Azure, a pale offset argent, base to dexter" (Norwegian: På blå grunn ein sølv pæl, avskoren og forskuva mot venstre). This means the arms have a blue field (background) and the charge is a pale that is offset. The pale has a tincture of argent which means it is commonly colored white, but if it is made out of metal, then silver is used. The offset pale symbolizes the two stage drop on one of Europe's highest waterfalls, the Mardalsfossen, which is located in the municipality. The arms were designed by Olav Sandø, from Eidsvåg. The municipal flag has the same design as the coat of arms.

=== Churches ===
The Church of Norway had four parishes (sokn) within Nesset Municipality. It was part of the Indre Romsdal prosti (deanery) in the Diocese of Møre.

Churches in Nesset Municipality
Parish (sokn)	Church name	Location of the church	Year built
Eikesdal	Eikesdal Church	Eikesdalen	1866
Eresfjord	Sira Church	Eresfjord	1869
Nesset	Nesset Church	Eidsvåg	1878
Vistdal	Vistdal Church	Myklebostad	1869

== Government ==
While it existed, Nesset Municipality was responsible for primary education (through 10th grade), outpatient health services, senior citizen services, welfare and other social services, zoning, economic development, and municipal roads and utilities. The municipality was governed by a municipal council of directly elected representatives. The mayor was indirectly elected by a vote of the municipal council. The municipality was under the jurisdiction of the Romsdal District Court and the Frostating Court of Appeal.

=== Municipal council ===
The municipal council (Kommunestyre) of Nesset Municipality was made up of 21 representatives that are elected to four year terms. The tables below show the historical composition of the council by political party.

Nesset kommunestyre 2015–2019
Party name (in Nynorsk)	Number of representatives
Labour Party (Arbeidarpartiet)	7
Progress Party (Framstegspartiet)	1
Conservative Party (Høgre)	6
Christian Democratic Party (Kristeleg Folkeparti)	2
Centre Party (Senterpartiet)	4
Local List(s) (Lokale lister)	1
Total number of members:	21

Nesset kommunestyre 2011–2015
Party name (in Nynorsk)	Number of representatives
Labour Party (Arbeidarpartiet)	7
Progress Party (Framstegspartiet)	1
Conservative Party (Høgre)	7
Christian Democratic Party (Kristeleg Folkeparti)	2
Centre Party (Senterpartiet)	3
Local List(s) (Lokale lister)	1
Total number of members:	21

Nesset kommunestyre 2007–2011
Party name (in Nynorsk)	Number of representatives
Labour Party (Arbeidarpartiet)	6
Progress Party (Framstegspartiet)	2
Conservative Party (Høgre)	4
Christian Democratic Party (Kristeleg Folkeparti)	2
Centre Party (Senterpartiet)	4
Liberal Party (Venstre)	2
Residents' List (Innbyggerlista)	1
Total number of members:	21

Nesset kommunestyre 2003–2007
Party name (in Nynorsk)	Number of representatives
Labour Party (Arbeidarpartiet)	7
Progress Party (Framstegspartiet)	2
Conservative Party (Høgre)	6
Christian Democratic Party (Kristeleg Folkeparti)	2
Centre Party (Senterpartiet)	8
Total number of members:	25

Nesset kommunestyre 1999–2003
Party name (in Nynorsk)	Number of representatives
Labour Party (Arbeidarpartiet)	7
Conservative Party (Høgre)	6
Christian Democratic Party (Kristeleg Folkeparti)	3
Centre Party (Senterpartiet)	8
Liberal Party (Venstre)	1
Total number of members:	25

Nesset kommunestyre 1995–1999
Party name (in Nynorsk)	Number of representatives
Labour Party (Arbeidarpartiet)	7
Conservative Party (Høgre)	4
Christian Democratic Party (Kristeleg Folkeparti)	3
Centre Party (Senterpartiet)	10
Liberal Party (Venstre)	1
Total number of members:	25

Nesset kommunestyre 1991–1995
Party name (in Nynorsk)	Number of representatives
Labour Party (Arbeidarpartiet)	9
Progress Party (Framstegspartiet)	1
Conservative Party (Høgre)	3
Christian Democratic Party (Kristeleg Folkeparti)	3
Centre Party (Senterpartiet)	8
Liberal Party (Venstre)	1
Total number of members:	25

Nesset kommunestyre 1987–1991
Party name (in Nynorsk)	Number of representatives
Labour Party (Arbeidarpartiet)	12
Progress Party (Framstegspartiet)	1
Conservative Party (Høgre)	3
Christian Democratic Party (Kristeleg Folkeparti)	4
Centre Party (Senterpartiet)	5
Liberal Party (Venstre)	2
Total number of members:	27

Nesset kommunestyre 1983–1987
Party name (in Nynorsk)	Number of representatives
Labour Party (Arbeidarpartiet)	11
Progress Party (Framstegspartiet)	1
Conservative Party (Høgre)	4
Christian Democratic Party (Kristeleg Folkeparti)	4
Centre Party (Senterpartiet)	5
Liberal Party (Venstre)	2
Total number of members:	27

Nesset kommunestyre 1979–1983
Party name (in Nynorsk)	Number of representatives
Labour Party (Arbeidarpartiet)	10
Conservative Party (Høgre)	4
Christian Democratic Party (Kristeleg Folkeparti)	6
Centre Party (Senterpartiet)	5
Liberal Party (Venstre)	2
Total number of members:	27

Nesset kommunestyre 1975–1979
Party name (in Nynorsk)	Number of representatives
Labour Party (Arbeidarpartiet)	10
Conservative Party (Høgre)	2
Christian Democratic Party (Kristeleg Folkeparti)	6
Centre Party (Senterpartiet)	7
Liberal Party (Venstre)	2
Total number of members:	27

Nesset kommunestyre 1971–1975
Party name (in Nynorsk)	Number of representatives
Labour Party (Arbeidarpartiet)	11
Conservative Party (Høgre)	2
Christian Democratic Party (Kristeleg Folkeparti)	5
Centre Party (Senterpartiet)	6
Liberal Party (Venstre)	3
Total number of members:	27

Nesset kommunestyre 1967–1971
Party name (in Nynorsk)	Number of representatives
Labour Party (Arbeidarpartiet)	11
Conservative Party (Høgre)	2
Christian Democratic Party (Kristeleg Folkeparti)	5
Centre Party (Senterpartiet)	6
Liberal Party (Venstre)	3
Total number of members:	27

Nesset kommunestyre 1963–1967
Party name (in Nynorsk)	Number of representatives
Labour Party (Arbeidarpartiet)	10
Conservative Party (Høgre)	2
Christian Democratic Party (Kristeleg Folkeparti)	6
Centre Party (Senterpartiet)	5
Liberal Party (Venstre)	4
Total number of members:	27

Nesset heradsstyre 1959–1963
Party name (in Nynorsk)	Number of representatives
Labour Party (Arbeidarpartiet)	9
Conservative Party (Høgre)	2
Christian Democratic Party (Kristeleg Folkeparti)	5
Centre Party (Senterpartiet)	3
Liberal Party (Venstre)	2
Total number of members:	21

Nesset heradsstyre 1955–1959
Party name (in Nynorsk)	Number of representatives
Labour Party (Arbeidarpartiet)	8
Conservative Party (Høgre)	2
Christian Democratic Party (Kristeleg Folkeparti)	6
Farmers' Party (Bondepartiet)	4
Liberal Party (Venstre)	1
Total number of members:	21

Nesset heradsstyre 1951–1955
Party name (in Nynorsk)	Number of representatives
Labour Party (Arbeidarpartiet)	7
Christian Democratic Party (Kristeleg Folkeparti)	6
Farmers' Party (Bondepartiet)	4
Liberal Party (Venstre)	2
Joint List(s) of Non-Socialist Parties (Borgarlege Felleslister)	1
Total number of members:	20

Nesset heradsstyre 1947–1951
Party name (in Nynorsk)	Number of representatives
Labour Party (Arbeidarpartiet)	7
Christian Democratic Party (Kristeleg Folkeparti)	6
Farmers' Party (Bondepartiet)	5
Liberal Party (Venstre)	2
Total number of members:	20

Nesset heradsstyre 1945–1947
Party name (in Nynorsk)	Number of representatives
Labour Party (Arbeidarpartiet)	7
Christian Democratic Party (Kristeleg Folkeparti)	5
Liberal Party (Venstre)	3
Local List(s) (Lokale lister)	5
Total number of members:	20

Nesset heradsstyre 1937–1941*
Party name (in Nynorsk)	Number of representatives
Labour Party (Arbeidarpartiet)	7
Farmers' Party (Bondepartiet)	9
Liberal Party (Venstre)	4
Total number of members:	20
Note: Due to the German occupation of Norway during World War II, no elections were held for new municipal councils until after the war ended in 1945.

=== Mayors ===
The mayor (Nynorsk: ordførar) of Nesset Municipality was the political leader of the municipality and the chairperson of the municipal council. The following people have held this position:

- 1838–1845: Fredrik Christian Møllerop Lied
- 1846–1850: Ebbe Carsten Schnitler
- 1851–1853: Jon Helle
- 1854–1855: Ivar A Nerland
- 1856–1860: Jon Helle
- 1861–1876: John Elgenes
- 1877–1885: Ola Jordfall
- 1886–1889: Andreas Sølsnes
- 1890–1892: Ole Andersen Strømme (V)
- 1892–1896: Ola Jordfall (H)
- 1896–1908: Knut Eidsør (H)
- 1908–1917: Ola H. Tjelle (V)
- 1917–1926: Nils Stadheim (Bp)
- 1926–1928: August Nerland (Bp)
- 1928–1942: Knut Toven (Bp)
- 1942–1945: Knut Meisingset (NS)
- 1945–1951: Knut Toven (KrF)
- 1950–1951: Trygve Langset (Ap)
- 1952–1952: Adolf Sætermyr (KrF)
- 1952–1955: Trygve Langset (Ap)
- 1956–1959: Audun Toven (KrF)
- 1960–1963: Aslak O. Gussiås (KrF)
- 1964–1967: Pedro Myklebostad (V)
- 1968–1969: Olav Rausandhaug (Ap)
- 1970–1971: Torstein Alstad (V)
- 1971–1975: Lorentz Tjelle (Sp)
- 1975–1987: Tormod Husby (Sp)
- 1987–1991: Agnes Varmedal Rønning (V)
- 1991–2003: Ola Tjelle (Sp)
- 2003–2007: Kaspar Mittet (Sp)
- 2007–2019: Rolf Jonas Hurlen (H)

== Geography ==
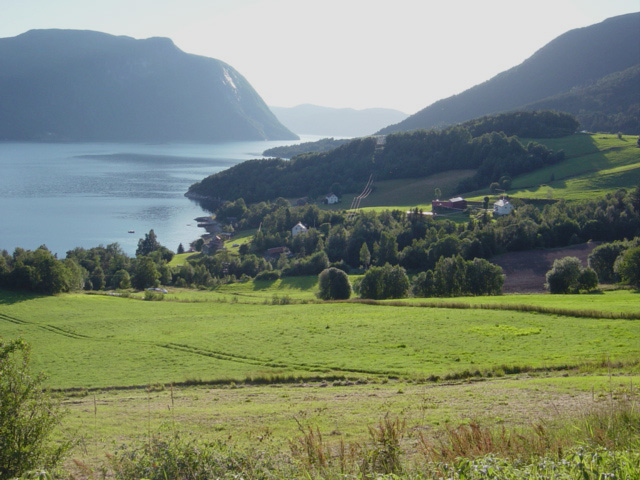
View of Boggestranda

The municipality was made up mostly of the Eikesdalen valley which surrounds the lake Eikesdalsvatnet. The lake is fed from the lake Aursjøen on the border of Oppland county. The water then flows through the Aura River into the lake Eikesdalsvatnet. That water then flows into the river Eira and then on to the Eresfjorden, a branch of the Langfjorden which itself is a branch off the great Romsdal Fjord. The mountains Skjorta, Fløtatinden, and Gjuratinden surround the main valley. The highest point in the municipality was the 1,964.4-metre (6,445 ft) tall mountain Høgbøra, near the southern border with Rauma Municipality.

=== Birdlife ===
From the shores of the fjord, to the towering mountains at 1,800 metres (5,900 ft) above sea level, the rural community of Nesset offers the visiting birder a range of habitats, and several interesting areas. One area worth checking is Eidsvågleirene. Though the selection of species will not be high, several of the commoner species can be found. The grey heron and mallard are characteristic species in the area.

== See also ==
- List of former municipalities of Norway
