= Eresfjord og Vistdal Municipality =

Former municipality in Møre og Romsdal, Norway

Eresfjord og Vistdal Municipality Eresfjord og Vistdal herred
- Former municipality
- Eresfjord og Vistdalen herred (historic name)
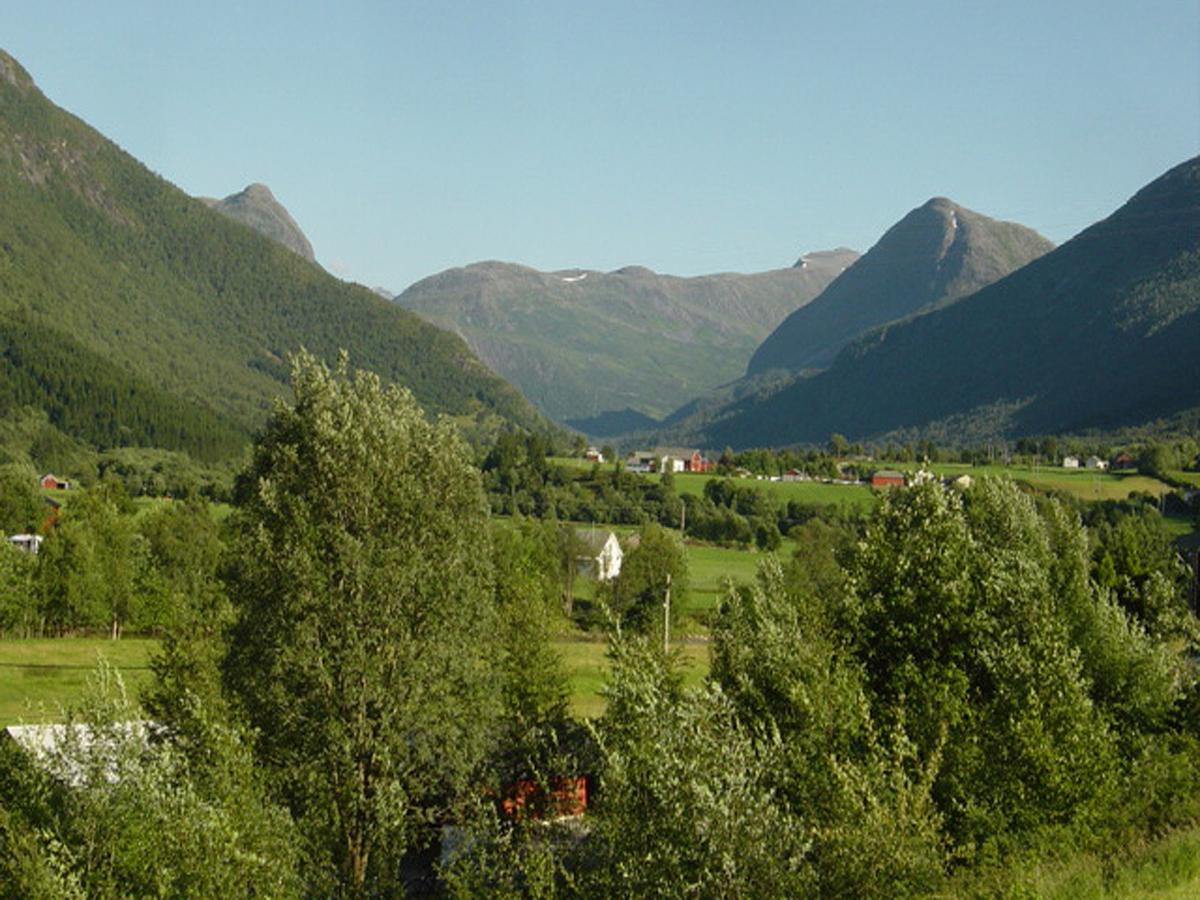
- View of the Vistdal area

- Møre og Romsdal within Norway

- Eresfjord og Vistdal within Møre og Romsdal
- Coordinates: 62°37′N 08°08′E
- Country: Norway
- County: Møre og Romsdal
- District: Romsdal
- Established: 1 Jan 1890
  - Preceded by: Nesset Municipality
- Disestablished: 1 Jan 1964
  - Succeeded by: Nesset Municipality
- Administrative centre: Eresfjord

Government
  - Mayor (1956–1963): Pedro Myklebostad

Area (upon dissolution)
  - Total: 758.2 km^{2} (292.7 sq mi)
  - Rank: #123 in Norway
- Highest elevation: 1,964.4 m (6,445 ft)

Population (1963)
  - Total: 1,302
  - Rank: #568 in Norway
  - Density: 1.7/km^{2} (4.4/sq mi)
  - Change (10 years): ▼ −9.9%
- Demonym(s): Eresfjording; Vistdaling

Official language
  - Norwegian form: Nynorsk
- Time zone: UTC+01:00 (CET)
  - Summer (DST): UTC+02:00 (CEST)
- ISO 3166 code: NO-1542

Eresfjord og Vistdal is a former municipality in Møre og Romsdal county, Norway. The 758-square-kilometre (293 sq mi) municipality existed from 1890 until its dissolution in 1964. The area is now part of Molde Municipality in the traditional district of Romsdal. The administrative centre was the village of Eresfjord. The municipality included the two parishes of Vistdal and Eresfjord and there were two churches in the municipality: Sira Church in Eresfjord and Vistdal Church in Myklebostad.

Prior to its dissolution in 1964, the 758.2-square-kilometre (292.7 sq mi) municipality was the 123rd largest by area out of the 689 municipalities in Norway. Eresfjord og Vistdal Municipality was the 568th most populous municipality in Norway with a population of about 1,302. The municipality's population density was 1.7 inhabitants per square kilometre (4.4/sq mi) and its population had decreased by 9.9% over the previous 10-year period.

== General information ==
The municipality of Eresfjord og Vistdal was established on 1 January 1890 when it was split off from Nesset Municipality. Eresfjord og Vistdal Municipality had an initial population of 2,155. During the 1960s, there were many municipal mergers across Norway due to the work of the Schei Committee. On 1 January 1964, Eresfjord og Vistdal Municipality (population: 1,289) was merged with Nesset Municipality (population: 2,360).

=== Name ===
The municipality (originally the parish) is named Eresfjord og Vistdal, a compound name meaning "Eresfjord and Vistdal", referring to the local Eresfjorden (fjord) and Vistdalen valley. The first part is Eresfjord (Old Norse: Œyrisfjǫrðr). The first element of this part comes from the old name of the local river Aura (Œyrir). This name comes from the word aurr which means "gravel" or "coarse sand". The last element of this part is fjǫrðr which means "fjord". The second part of the name is Vistdal or Vistdalen (Old Norse: Vistardalr). The first element of this part is the genitive case of the word vistr which means "calm" or "quiet one", referring to the main river running through the valley. The lower part of the river is a particularly quiet and gentle river. The last element of this part is dalr which means "valley" or "dale". Historically, the name of the municipality was spelled Eresfjord og Vistdalen. On 3 November 1917, a royal resolution changed the spelling of the name of the municipality to Eresfjord og Vistdal, removing the definite form ending -en.

=== Churches ===
The Church of Norway had two parishes (sokn) within Eresfjord og Vistdal Municipality. At the time of the municipal dissolution, it was part of the Nesset prestegjeld and the Indre Romsdal prosti (deanery) in the Diocese of Nidaros.

Churches in Eresfjord og Vistdal Municipality
| Parish (sokn) | Church name | Location of the church | Year built |
|---|---|---|---|
| Eresfjord | Sira Church | Eresfjord | 1869 |
| Eresfjord | Eikesdal Chapel | Eikesdalen | 1866 |
| Vistdal | Vistdal Church | Myklebostad | 1869 |

== Geography ==
The municipality was located at the end of the Langfjorden and Eresfjorden. Nesset Municipality was to the north, Sunndal Municipality was to the east, Lesja Municipality (in Oppland county) was to the south, and Grytten Municipality, Hen Municipality, and Veøy Municipality were to the west. The highest point in the municipality was the 1,964.4-metre (6,445 ft) tall mountain Høgbøra.

== Government ==
While it existed, Eresfjord og Vistdal Municipality was responsible for primary education (through 10th grade), outpatient health services, senior citizen services, welfare and other social services, zoning, economic development, and municipal roads and utilities. The municipality was governed by a municipal council of directly elected representatives. The mayor was indirectly elected by a vote of the municipal council. The municipality was under the jurisdiction of the Frostating Court of Appeal.

=== Municipal council ===
The municipal council (Heradsstyre) of Eresfjord og Vistdal Municipality was made up of 17 representatives that were elected to four-year terms. The tables below show the historical composition of the council by political party.

Eresfjord og Vistdal heradsstyre 1959–1963
| Party name (in Nynorsk) | Number of representatives |
|---|---|
| Local List(s) (Lokale lister) | 17 |
| Total number of members: | 17 |
Note: On 1 January 1964, Eresfjord og Vistdal Municipality became part of Nesset Municipality.

Eresfjord og Vistdal heradsstyre 1955–1959
| Party name (in Nynorsk) | Number of representatives |
|---|---|
| Labour Party (Arbeidarpartiet) | 2 |
| Farmers' Party (Bondepartiet) | 1 |
| Joint List(s) of Non-Socialist Parties (Borgarlege Felleslister) | 11 |
| Local List(s) (Lokale lister) | 3 |
| Total number of members: | 17 |

Eresfjord og Vistdal heradsstyre 1951–1955
| Party name (in Nynorsk) | Number of representatives |
|---|---|
| Liberal Party (Venstre) | 3 |
| List of workers, fishermen, and small farmholders (Arbeidarar, fiskarar, småbrukarar liste) | 3 |
| Joint List(s) of Non-Socialist Parties (Borgarlege Felleslister) | 8 |
| Local List(s) (Lokale lister) | 2 |
| Total number of members: | 16 |

Eresfjord og Vistdal heradsstyre 1947–1951
| Party name (in Nynorsk) | Number of representatives |
|---|---|
| Labour Party (Arbeidarpartiet) | 2 |
| Joint List(s) of Non-Socialist Parties (Borgarlege Felleslister) | 6 |
| Local List(s) (Lokale lister) | 8 |
| Total number of members: | 16 |

Eresfjord og Vistdal heradsstyre 1945–1947
| Party name (in Nynorsk) | Number of representatives |
|---|---|
| Labour Party (Arbeidarpartiet) | 1 |
| List of workers, fishermen, and small farmholders (Arbeidarar, fiskarar, småbrukarar liste) | 1 |
| Joint List(s) of Non-Socialist Parties (Borgarlege Felleslister) | 12 |
| Local List(s) (Lokale lister) | 2 |
| Total number of members: | 16 |

Eresfjord og Vistdal heradsstyre 1937–1941*
| Party name (in Nynorsk) | Number of representatives |
|---|---|
| Labour Party (Arbeidarpartiet) | 3 |
| Farmers' Party (Bondepartiet) | 2 |
| Liberal Party (Venstre) | 2 |
| Joint List(s) of Non-Socialist Parties (Borgarlege Felleslister) | 5 |
| Local List(s) (Lokale lister) | 4 |
| Total number of members: | 16 |
Note: Due to the German occupation of Norway during World War II, no elections were held for new municipal councils until after the war ended in 1945.

=== Mayors ===
The mayor (Nynorsk: ordførar) of Eresfjord og Vistdal Municipality was the political leader of the municipality and the chairperson of the municipal council. The following people have held this position:

- 1890–1910: Andreas Sølsnæs
- 1911–1913: Torvald Jørstad
- 1914–1926: Henning Øveraas
- 1927–1928: Henrik Dahl
- 1929–1931: Kristian O. Meland
- 1932–1934: Peder Siira
- 1935–1942: Kristian O. Meland
- 1943–1945: Einar Strand
- 1945–1948: Kristian O. Meland
- 1949–1951: Torvald Hånde
- 1952–1955: Erling Bø
- 1956–1963: Pedro Myklebostad

== See also ==
- List of former municipalities of Norway
