= Myklebostad, Møre og Romsdal =

Village in Molde Municipality, Norway

Vistdal Myklebostad
- Village
- Interactive map of Vistdal; Myklebostad
- Location within Møre og Romsdal Location within Norway
- Coordinates: 62.7203°N 7.9328°E
- Country: Norway
- Region: Western Norway
- County: Møre og Romsdal
- District: Romsdal
- Municipality: Molde Municipality
- Elevation: 3 m (9.8 ft)

Population
  - Total: Approx. 350
- Time zone: UTC+01:00 (CET)
  - Summer (DST): UTC+02:00 (CEST)
- Post Code: 6364 Vistdal

Vistdal or Myklebostad is a village in the Vistdalen valley in Molde Municipality in Møre og Romsdal county, Norway.

The village center is called Myklebostad while the greater village area is known as Vistdal. The village has a grocery shop with gasoline pumps, cafe on Saturdays, campsite, school, kindergarten, and Vistdal Church. Vistdal also has a sports field equipped with an association football field, a beach volleyball court, and a disc golf field.

The village is located along the south side of the Langfjorden, just west of the mouth of the Eresfjorden, about 10 kilometres (6.2 mi) southwest of the village of Eidsvåg. The village of Eresfjord lies about 18 kilometres (11 mi) to the southeast through the Vistdal valley.

== History ==
The village was historically part of the old prestegjeld of Nesset. In 1838 it became part of Nesset Municipality. From 1890 until 1964, it was part of the old Eresfjord og Vistdal Municipality. In 1964 it became part of Nesset Municipality once again. Since 2020, it has been part of Molde Municipality.
