= Skjorta =

Mountain in Møre og Romsdal, Norway

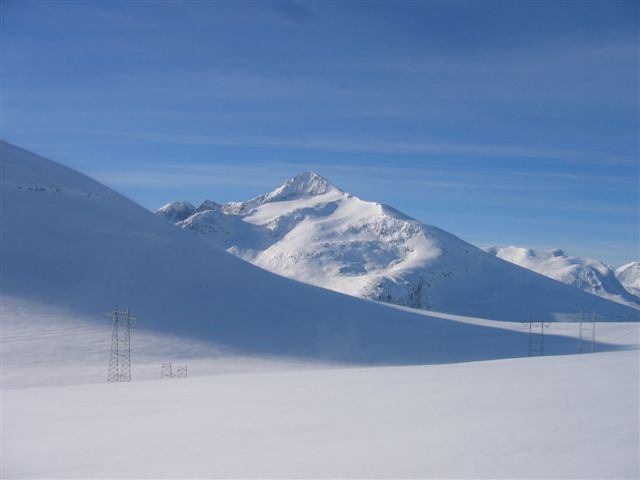

Highest point
- Elevation: 1,711 m (5,614 ft)
- Prominence: 618 m (2,028 ft)
- Isolation: 8.43 km (5.24 mi) to Vikesoksa
- Coordinates: 62°39′28″N 8°12′55″E

Geography
- Interactive map of the mountain
- Location: Møre og Romsdal, Norway
- Topo map(s): 1420 III Sunndalsøra (summit) and 1320 II Eresfjord (ascent)

Climbing
- Easiest route: Hiking

Skjorta is a mountain in Molde Municipality in Møre og Romsdal county, Norway. The mountain is located 5 kilometres (3.1 mi) southeast of the Eresfjorden, 5 kilometres (3.1 mi) north of the lake Eikesdalsvatnet and the mountain Fløtatinden, 5 kilometres (3.1 mi) east of the Eira River and the village of Eresfjord, and 1.5 kilometres (0.93 mi) west of the border with Sunndal Municipality.

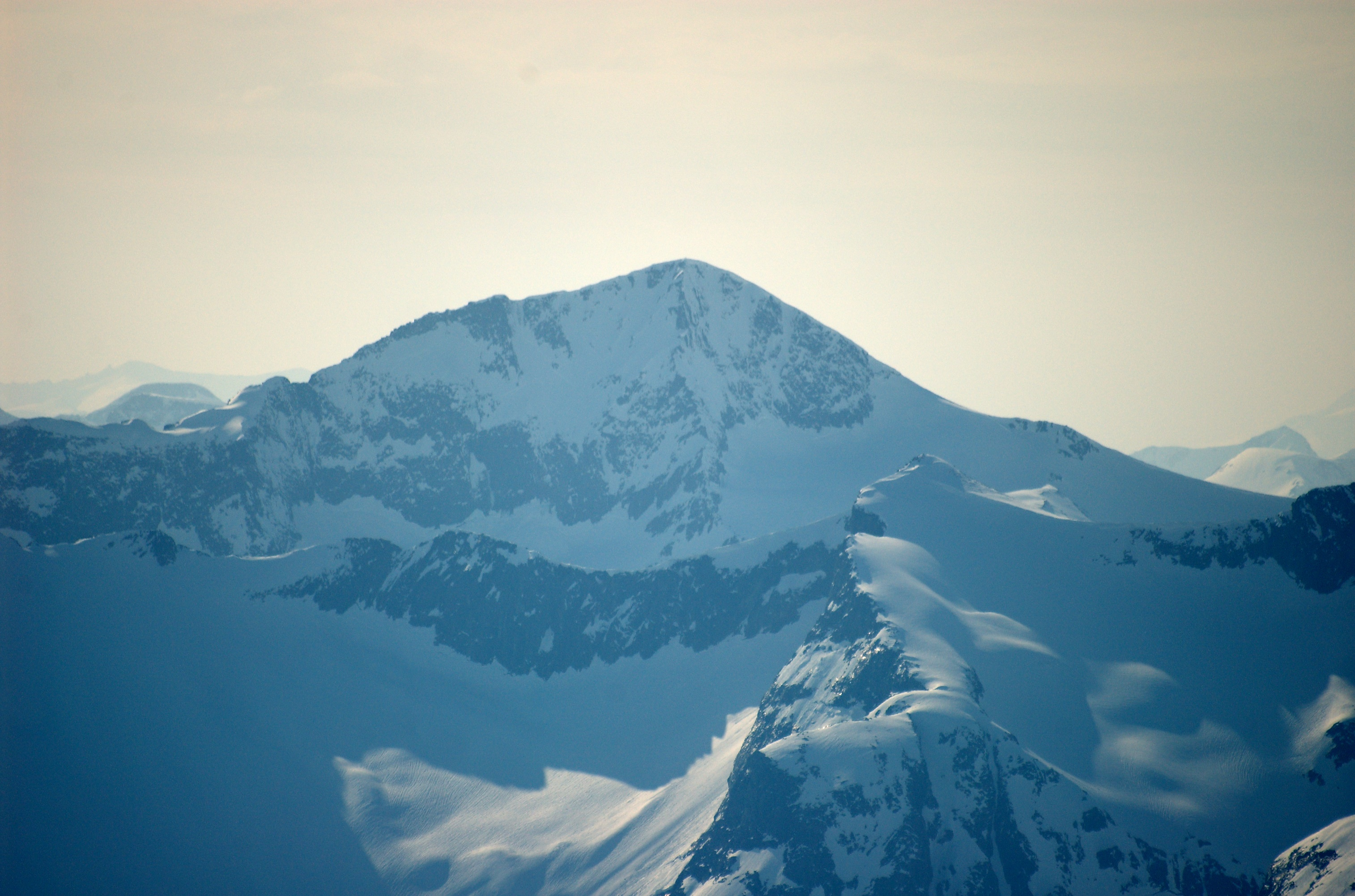
Skjorta seen from Dronningkrona (north east)

From the summit, there is a view of the Mardalsfossen waterfall, about 20 kilometres (12 mi) to the south.

== See also ==
- List of mountains of Norway
