= Fløtatinden =

Mountain in Molde, Møre og Romsdal, Norway

- Interactive map of the mountain

Highest point
- Elevation: 1,711 m (5,614 ft)
- Prominence: 390 m (1,280 ft)
- Isolation: 3.5 km (2.2 mi) to Vikesoksa
- Coordinates: 62°36′31″N 8°12′51″E

Geography
- Location: Møre og Romsdal, Norway
- Topo map(s): 1320 II Eresfjord (summit) and 1420 III Sunndalsøra (ascent)

Fløtatinden is a mountain in Molde Municipality in Møre og Romsdal county, Norway. The summit is a popular ski destination, accessed from the east.

The mountain is located on the eastern shore of the lake Eikesdalsvatnet, and it has a view towards the Mardalsfossen waterfall in the south and the mountain Skjorta in the north. The village of Eresfjord lies about 10 kilometres (6.2 mi) to the northwest along the Eira River.

One of the lower peaks to the north of the main peak is Trondskjortetinden.

== See also ==
- List of mountains of Norway
