= Nesset =

Nesset may refer to:

== People ==
- Arnfinn Nesset (1936–2025), Norwegian nurse, nursing home manager, and convicted serial killer
- Jeff Nesset (born 1952), American businessman and former politician from Idaho

== Places ==
- Nesset Municipality, a former municipality in Møre og Romsdal county, Norway
- Nesset Church, a church in Molde Municipality in Møre og Romsdal county, Norway
- Nesset Parsonage, a parsonage for Nesset Church in Molde Municipality in Møre og Romsdal county, Norway
- Nesset, Levanger, a village in Levanger Municipality in Trøndelag county, Norway
- Nesset, Akershus, a village in Ås Municipality in Akershus county, Norway
- Nesset Lake, a shallow lake in the Canadian province of Saskatchewan

== See also ==
- Neset
