= Neset =

Neset may refer to:

== Places ==
- Enebakkneset (also called Neset), a village in Lillestrøm Municipality in Akershus county, Norway
- Neset, Frøya, a village in Frøya Municipality in Trøndelag county, Norway
- Neset, Levanger, a village in Levanger Municipality in Trøndelag county, Norway
- Neset, Vestland, a village in Alver Municipality in Vestland county, Norway

== See also ==
- Nesset Municipality, a former municipality in Møre og Romsdal county, Norway
- Nesset (disambiguation)
- Nes (disambiguation)
