= Kleneggen =

Mountain in Møre og Romsdal, Norway

Kleneggen Høgbøra
- Interactive map of the mountain

Highest point
- Elevation: 1,964.4 m (6,445 ft)
- Prominence: 1,105 m (3,625 ft)
- Isolation: 33.3 km (20.7 mi) to Puttegga
- Coordinates: 62°23′48″N 8°12′21″E

Geography
- Location: Møre og Romsdal, Norway

Climbing
- First ascent: 1884

Kleneggen or Høgbøra is a mountain in Molde Municipality in Møre og Romsdal county. The 1,964.7 metres (6,446 ft) tall mountain is the highest point in Molde Municipality (it was part of Nesset Municipality prior to 2020). The mountain peak is located in the alpine mountain area between the Eikesdalen valley in Molde Municipality and the village of Verma in the Romsdalen valley (in Rauma Municipality). From the top, there are views along Eikesdalsvatnet lake.

== See also ==
- List of mountains in Norway by prominence
- List of mountains in Norway by height
