= Prestaksla Nature Reserve =

Protected area in Norway

- Prestaksla naturreservat
- IUCN category Ia (strict nature reserve)
- Interactive map of Prestaksla Nature Reserve
- Nearest city: Eidsvåg
- Coordinates: 62°45′6″N 8°1′52″E
- Area: 97.0 ha (240 acres)
- Established: 2010

The Prestaksla Nature Reserve (Norwegian: Prestaksla naturreservat) is located on the Prestneset headland in Molde Municipality in Møre og Romsdal county, Norway.

The area received protection in 2010 in order to protect an important forest area. The area has broadleaf deciduous forest mixed with pine forest. The broadleaf deciduous forest primarily contains hazel and some elm. On the wooded mountainside below Prestaksla, there is a partially old-growth pine forest.

The reserve is located close to Bjørnstjerne Bjørnson's childhood home at the Nesset Parsonage.
