= Eidsvåg, Nesset =

Village in Molde Municipality, Norway

Eidsvåg
- Village
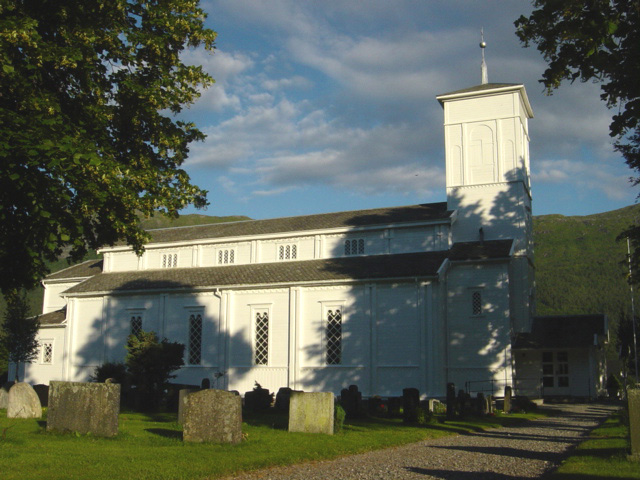
- View of the church in Eidsvåg
- Interactive map of Eidsvåg
- Location within Møre og Romsdal Location within Norway
- Coordinates: 62.7766°N 8.0655°E
- Country: Norway
- Region: Western Norway
- County: Møre og Romsdal
- District: Romsdal
- Municipality: Molde Municipality

Area
  - Total: 1.11 km^{2} (0.43 sq mi)
- Elevation: 4 m (13 ft)

Population (2024)
  - Total: 986
  - Density: 888/km^{2} (2,300/sq mi)
- Time zone: UTC+01:00 (CET)
  - Summer (DST): UTC+02:00 (CEST)
- Post Code: 6460 Eidsvåg i Romsdal

Eidsvåg is a village in Molde Municipality in Møre og Romsdal county, Norway. The village is located at the end of the Langfjorden on the isthmus connecting the Romsdal peninsula to the Norwegian mainland. It is located about 8.5 kilometres (5.3 mi) southwest of the village of Raudsand, about 20 kilometres (12 mi) north of the village of Eresfjord, and 9 kilometres (5.6 mi) north of the village of Boggestranda. Nesset Church is located in this village. The village is home to some mechanical industries.

The 1.11-square-kilometre (270-acre) village has a population (2024) of 986 and a population density of 888 inhabitants per square kilometre (2,300/sq mi).

The Prestaksla Nature Reserve lies southwest of the village.

The village was the administrative centre of the old Nesset Municipality until its dissolution in 2020.
