= Rausand =

Village in Molde Municipality, Norway

Raudsand Rausand
- Village
- Interactive map of Raudsand
- Location within Møre og Romsdal Location within Norway
- Coordinates: 62.8370°N 8.1246°E
- Country: Norway
- Region: Western Norway
- County: Møre og Romsdal
- District: Romsdal
- Municipality: Molde Municipality

Area
  - Total: 0.5 km^{2} (0.19 sq mi)
- Elevation: 6 m (20 ft)

Population (2024)
  - Total: 250
  - Density: 500/km^{2} (1,300/sq mi)
- Time zone: UTC+01:00 (CET)
  - Summer (DST): UTC+02:00 (CEST)
- Post Code: 6462 Raudsand

Raudsand or Rausand is a village in Molde Municipality in Møre og Romsdal county, Norway. It is located on the Romsdal peninsula along the Tingvollfjorden about 9 kilometres (5.6 mi) northeast of the village of Eidsvåg and 8 kilometres (5.0 mi) south of the village of Angvika in Gjemnes Municipality.

The 0.5-square-kilometre (120-acre) village had a population (in 2024) of 250 and a population density of 500 per square kilometre (1,300/sq mi).
