= Nesset Church =

Church in Møre og Romsdal, Norway

- Nesset kyrkje
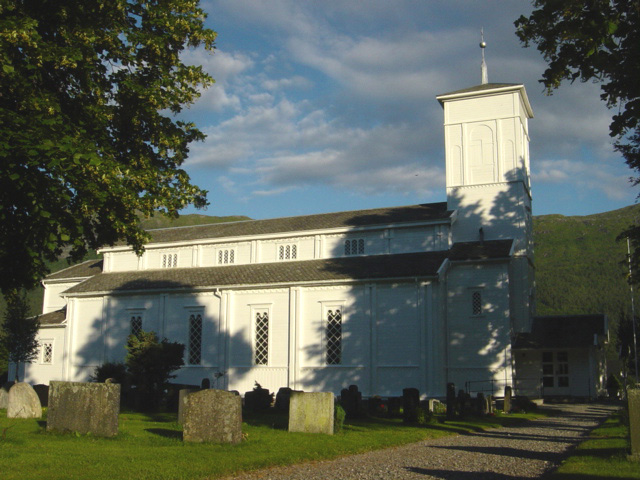
- View of the church
- Nesset Church
- 62°46′39″N 8°04′13″E
- Location: Molde Municipality, Møre og Romsdal
- Country: Norway
- Denomination: Church of Norway
- Churchmanship: Evangelical Lutheran

History
- Status: Parish church
- Founded: 14th century
- Consecrated: 27 September 1878

Architecture
- Functional status: Active
- Architect: Johannes Henrik Nissen
- Architectural type: Long church
- Completed: 1878 (148 years ago)

Specifications
- Capacity: 250
- Materials: Wood

Administration
- Diocese: Møre bispedømme
- Deanery: Molde domprosti
- Parish: Nesset
- Norwegian Cultural Heritage Site
- Type: Church
- Status: Listed
- ID: 85125

Nesset Church (Norwegian: Nesset kyrkje) is a parish church of the Church of Norway in Molde Municipality in Møre og Romsdal county, Norway. It is located in the village of Eidsvåg. It is the church for the Nesset parish which is part of the Molde domprosti (arch-deanery) in the Diocese of Møre. The white, wooden church was built in a long church design in 1878 by the architect Johannes Henrik Nissen. The church seats about 250 people.

== History ==
The earliest existing historical records of the church for the Nesset parish date back to 1589, but there are records of the archbishop visiting the parish back to 1426, but neither year was the year the church was first built. The first church in Nesset was located at the village of Rød, about 5 kilometres (3.1 mi) west of the present location of the church. It was a stave church that was likely built during the 14th century. The nave of the old church measured about 15.9 by 8 metres (52 ft × 26 ft) and the choir measured about 6.4 by 4 metres (21 ft × 13 ft). Some time before the 1600s, the old choir (built in a stave construction) was torn down and rebuilt using a timber-framed method. A sacristy and church porch were also added around the same time.

In 1814, this church served as an election church (Norwegian: valgkirke). Together with more than 300 other parish churches across Norway, it was a polling station for elections to the 1814 Norwegian Constituent Assembly which wrote the Constitution of Norway. This was Norway's first national elections. Each church parish was a constituency that elected people called "electors" who later met together in each county to elect the representatives for the assembly that was to meet at Eidsvoll Manor later that year.

In the 1870s, the parish decided to move the church about 5 kilometres (3.1 mi) to the east, to the village of Eidsvåg, the municipal centre of the old Nesset Municipality. In 1878, a new church was constructed there. It was a long church that was designed by Henrik Nissen and the lead builder was Friedrich Spolert. The new building was consecrated on Friday, 27 September 1878. The old church at Rød was torn down in 1885. The tower was originally slimmer and had a higher spire. This was changed in a major renovation and restoration in 1930-1932 according to plans by Claus Hjelte. Significant interior changes were also made during this renovation.

== Media gallery ==
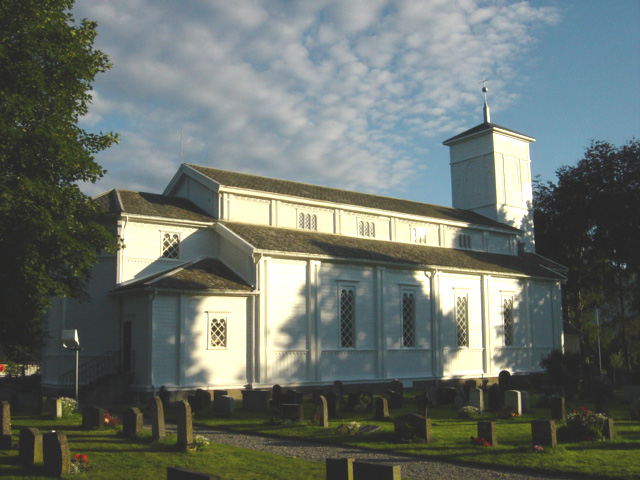

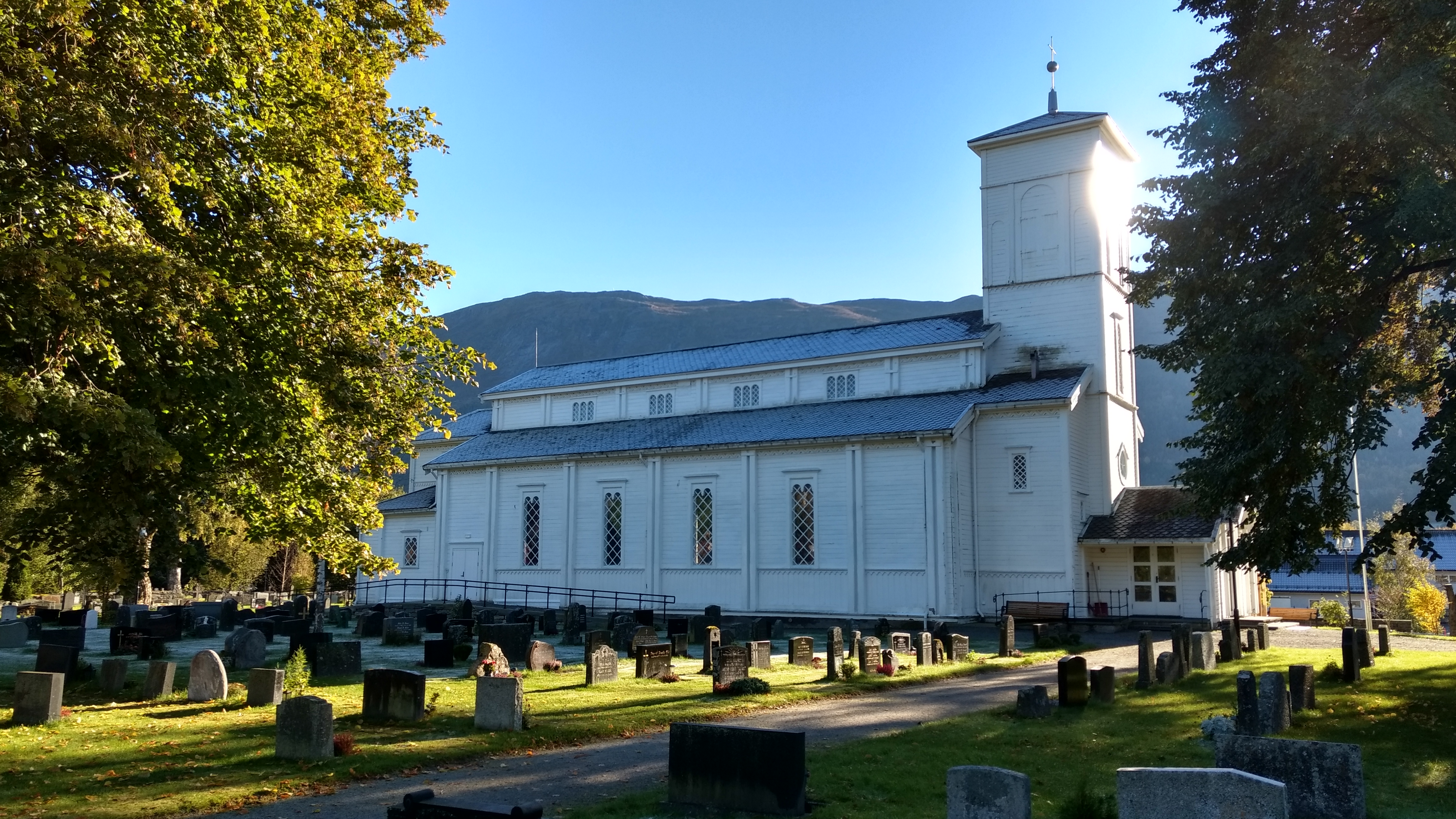

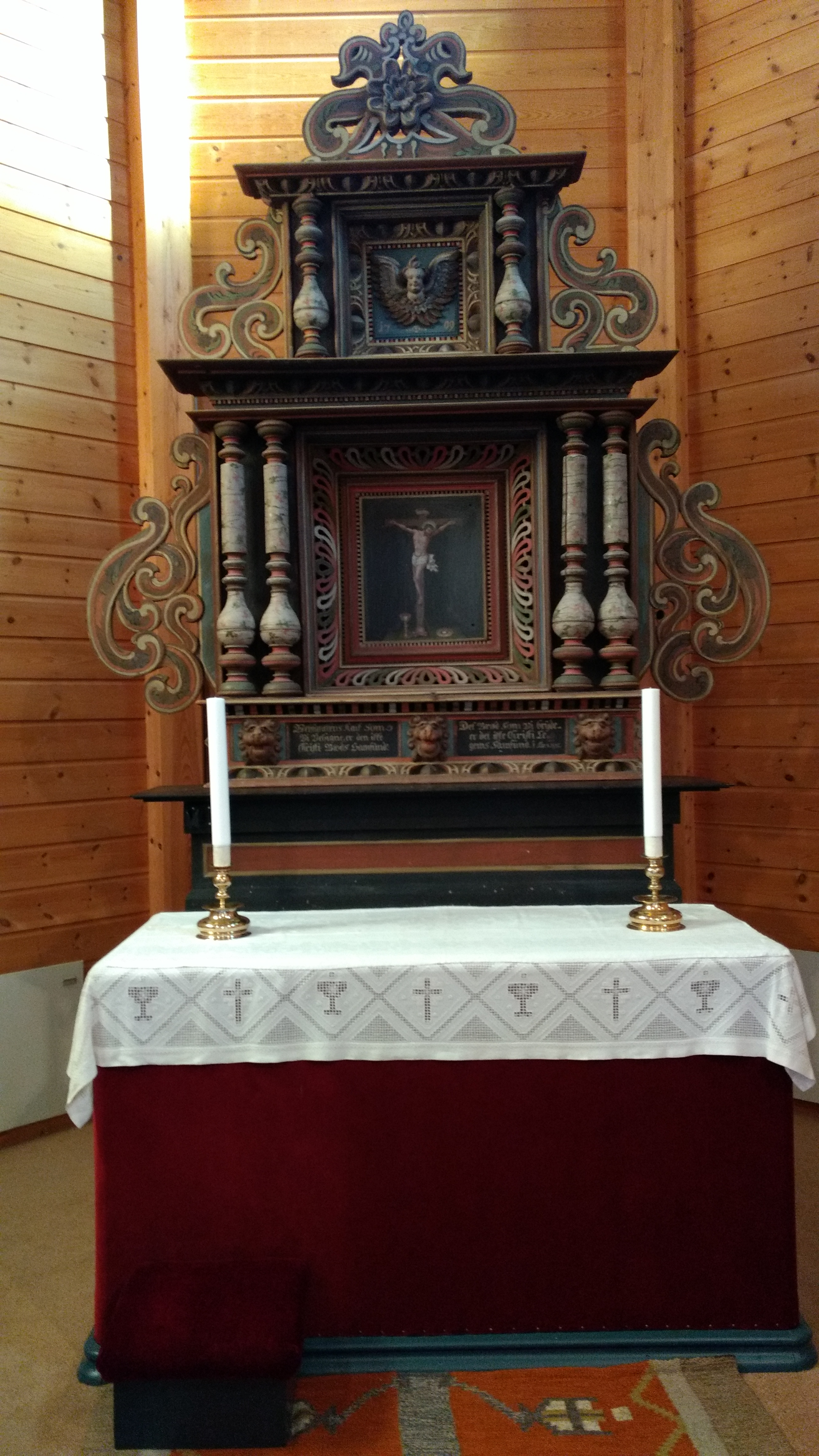

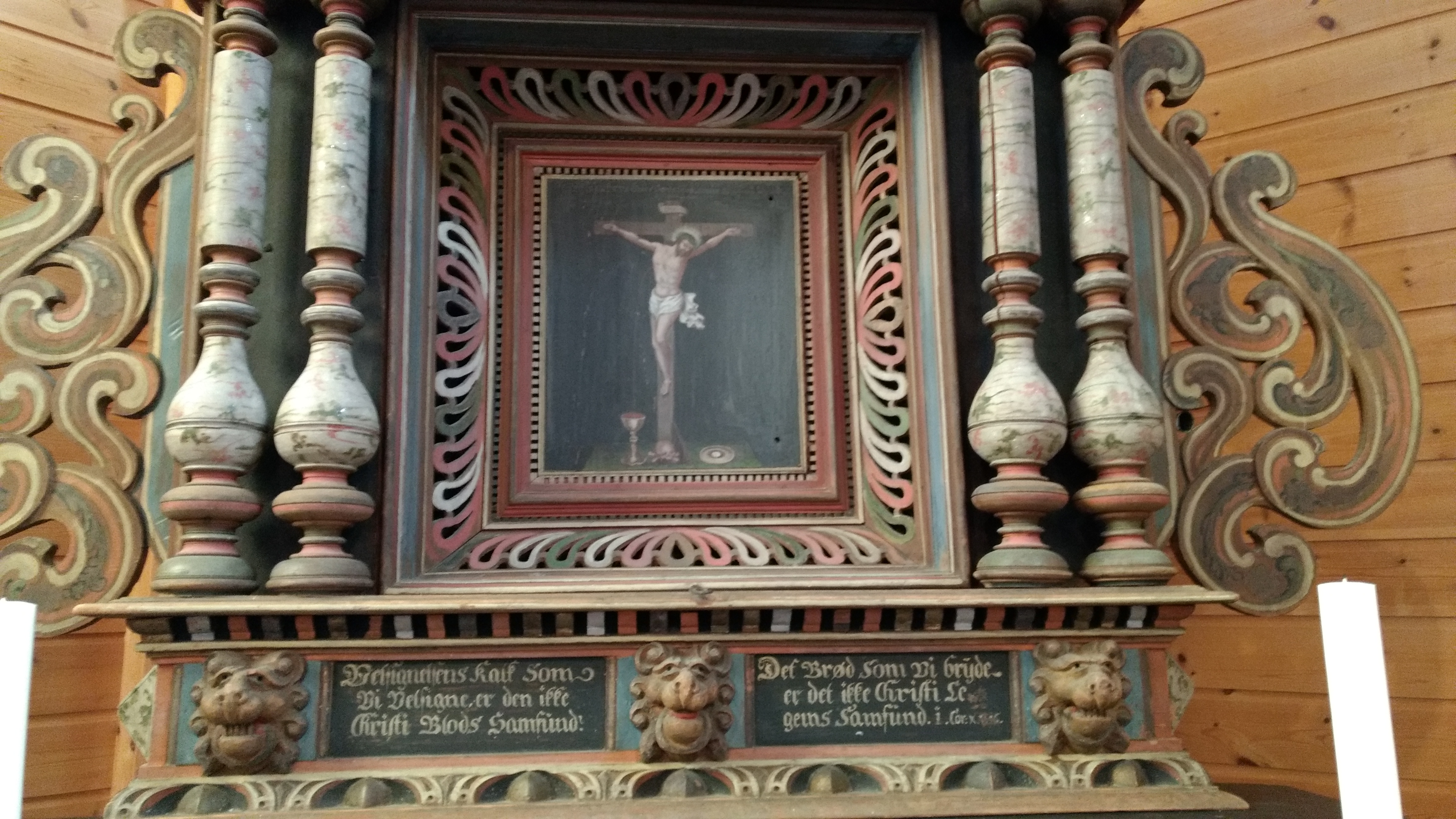

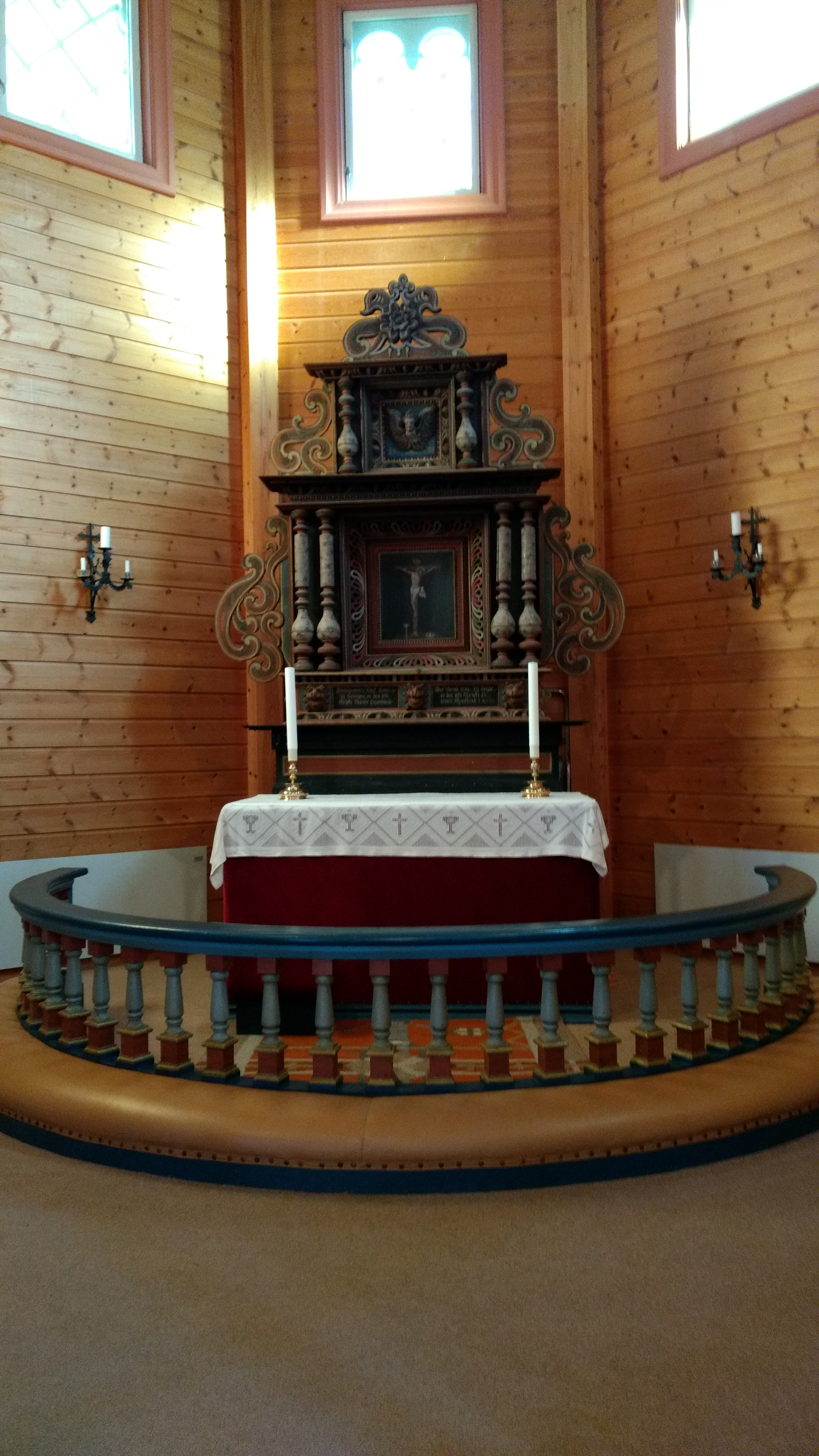

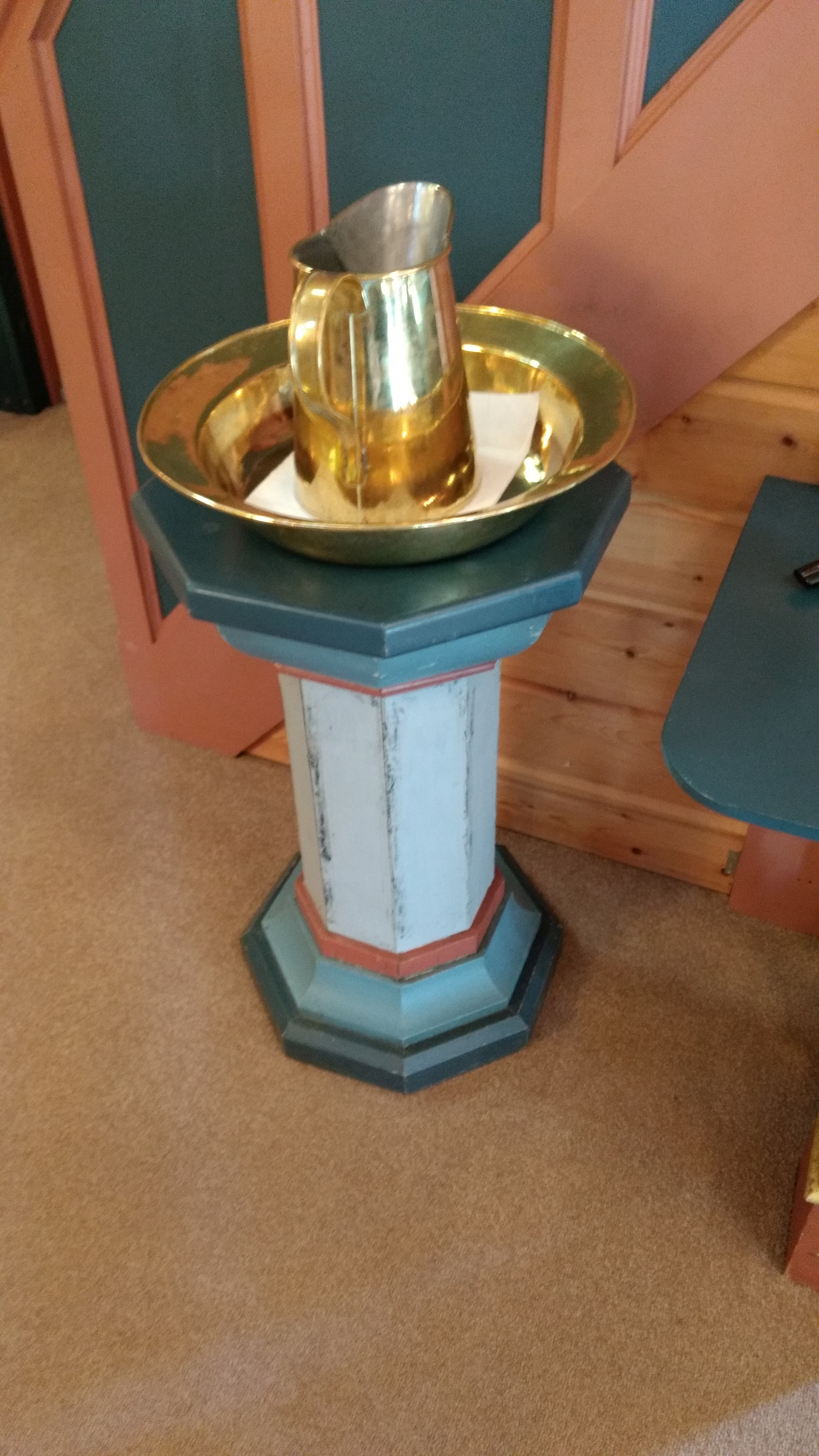

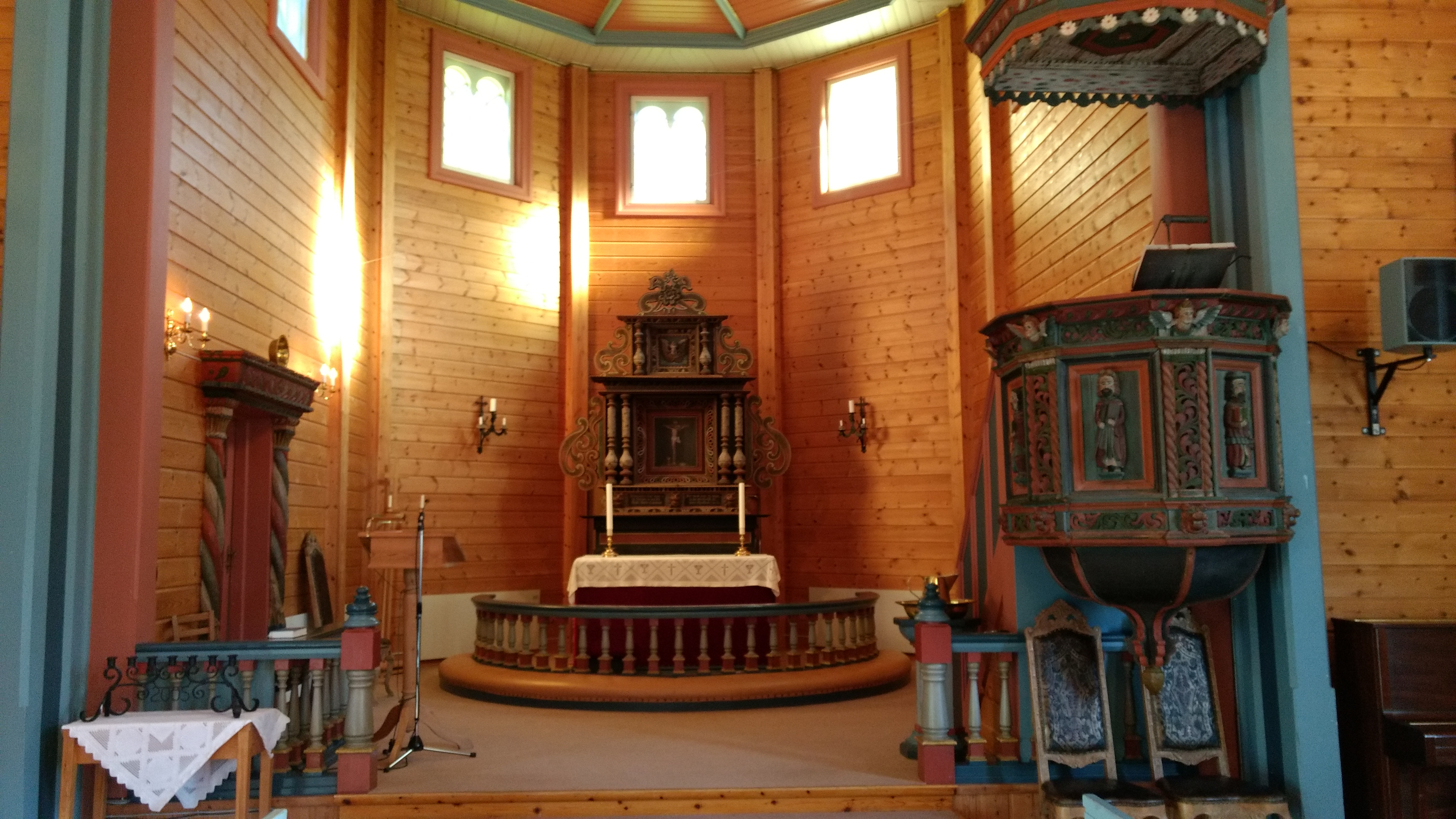

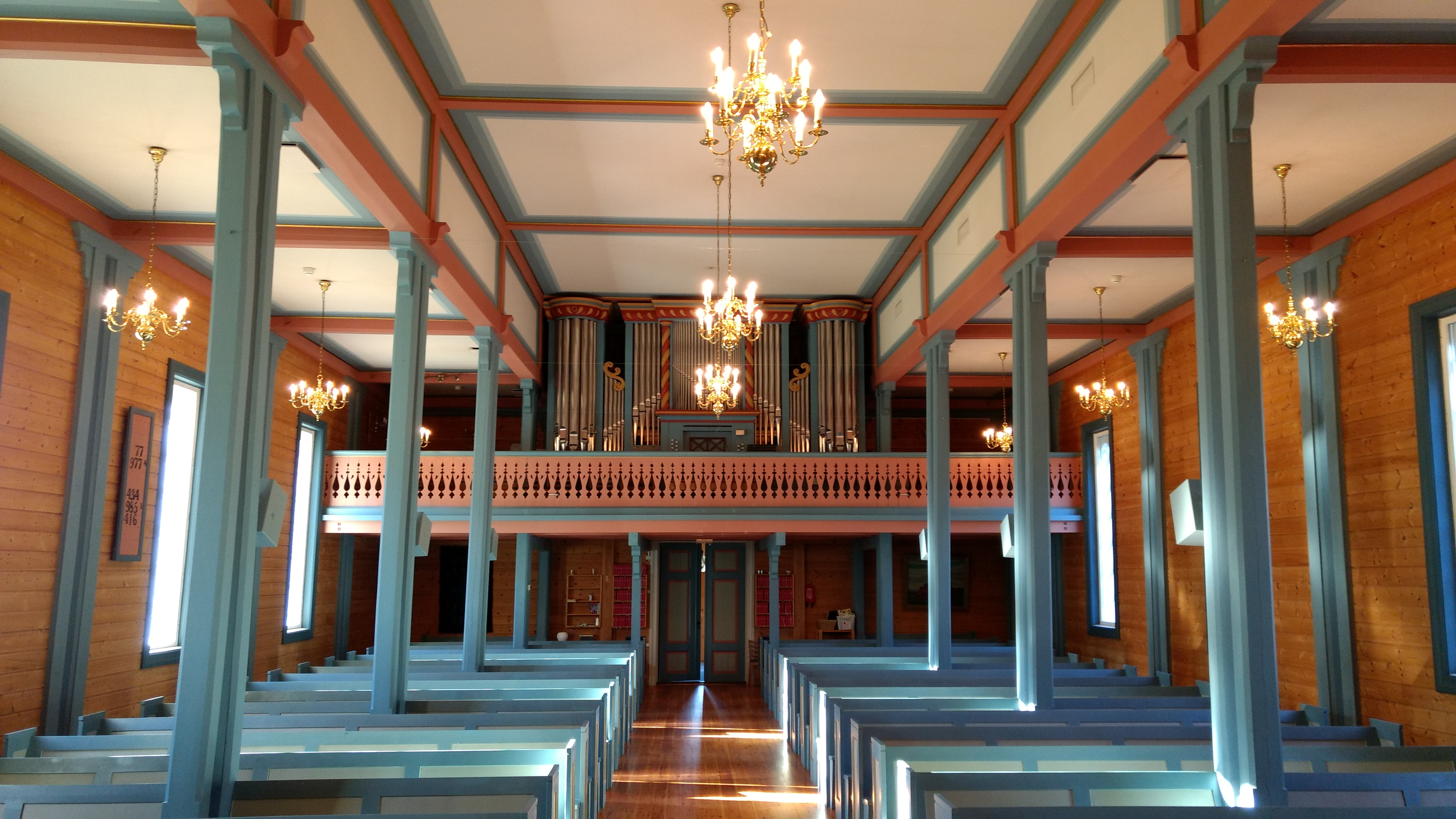

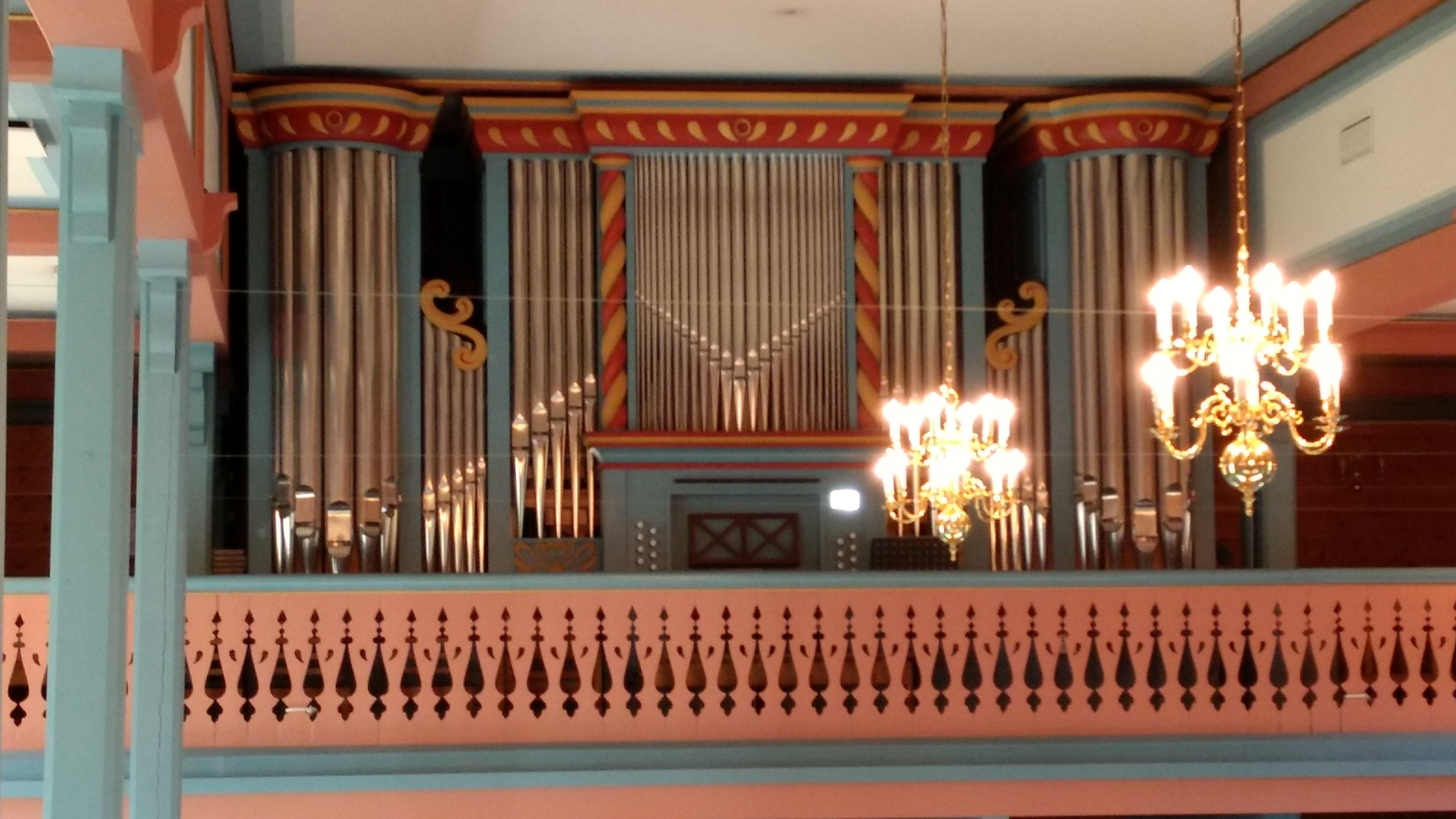

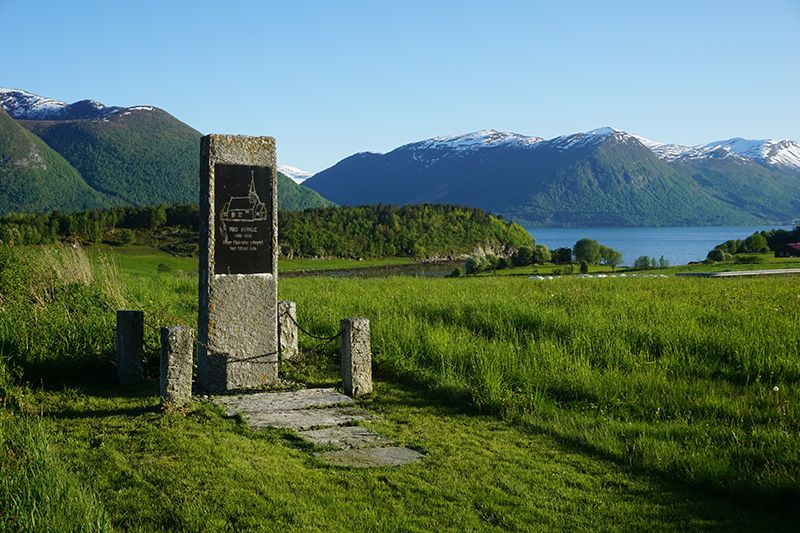
Location of the old "Rød" church

== See also ==
- List of churches in Møre
