= Boggestranda =

Village in Molde Municipality, Norway

- Village
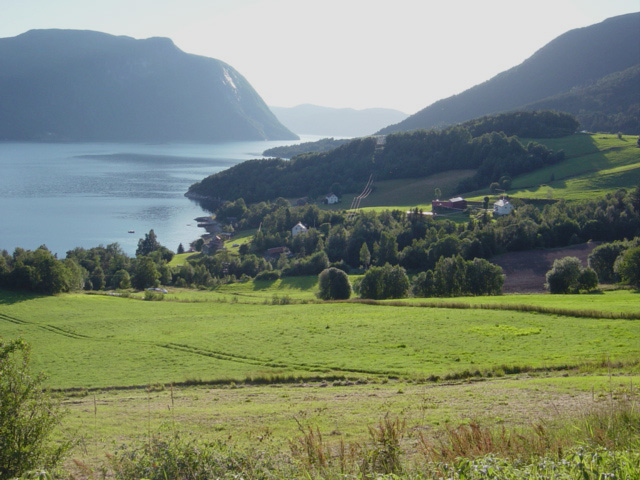
- Interactive map of Boggestranda
- Location within Møre og Romsdal Location within Norway
- Coordinates: 62.7383°N 8.0820°E
- Country: Norway
- Region: Western Norway
- County: Møre og Romsdal
- District: Romsdal
- Municipality: Molde Municipality
- Elevation: 28 m (92 ft)
- Time zone: UTC+01:00 (CET)
  - Summer (DST): UTC+02:00 (CEST)
- Post Code: 6460 Eidsvåg i Romsdal

Boggestranda is a village in Molde Municipality in Møre og Romsdal county, Norway. It is located along the east shore of the Eresfjorden, about 10 kilometres (6.2 mi) south of the village of Eidsvåg and 10 kilometres (6.2 mi) north of the village of Eresfjord. There are four sites of petroglyphic prehistoric art in the style of rock carvings dating back to around 6000 BC in the area of Boggestranda.
