= Eresfjord =

Village in Molde Municipality, Norway

- Village
- Interactive map of Eresfjord
- Location within Møre og Romsdal Location within Norway
- Coordinates: 62.6610°N 8.1109°E
- Country: Norway
- Region: Western Norway
- County: Møre og Romsdal
- District: Romsdal
- Municipality: Molde Municipality
- Elevation: 13 m (43 ft)
- Time zone: UTC+01:00 (CET)
  - Summer (DST): UTC+02:00 (CEST)
- Post Code: 6470 Eresfjord

Eresfjord is a village in Molde Municipality in Møre og Romsdal county, Norway. The village is located along the river Eira between the Eresfjorden and the lake Eikesdalsvatnet. The mountain Skjorta lies just to the east of the village. The village of Myklebostad (Vistdal) lies about 17 kilometres (11 mi) to the northwest through the Vistdal valley and the village of Boggestranda lies about 10 kilometres (6.2 mi) to the north. The village has a population of 363 (in 2015).

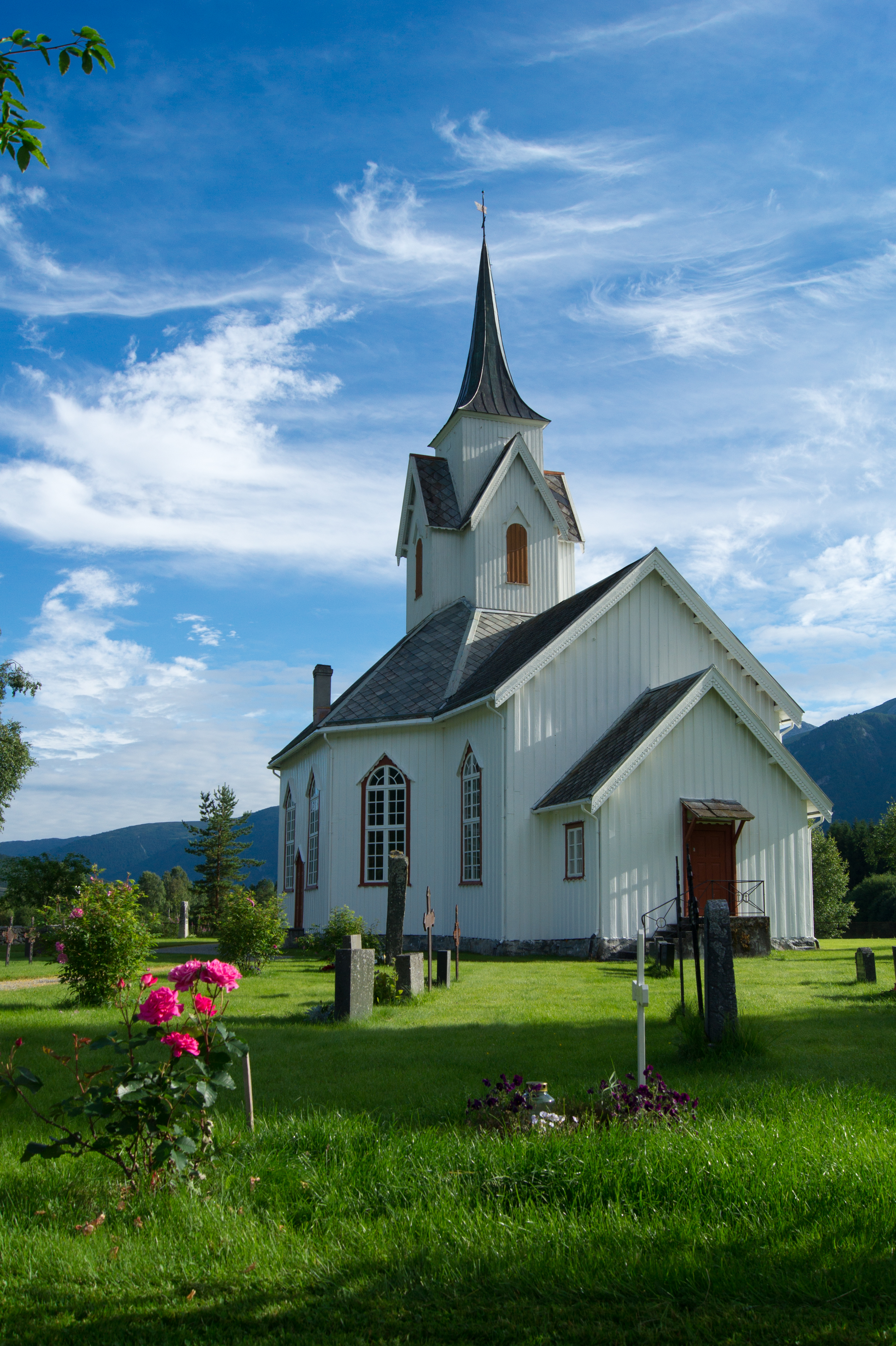
Sira Church in Eresfjord

Agriculture, salmon fishing, and tourism are the main form of income in the area. Eresfjord also has its own hatchery (built in 1956) that provides salmon and sea trout to the Eira River and Eikesdalsvatnet. The plant puts out 50,000 salmon and 2,500 sea trout annually.

The village has a harbor for 33 small boats and offers a clubhouse, a dance floor, and a guest harbor which received a visit from King Harald V in 2003. National Geographic Adventure acknowledged Eresfjord as having the world's most beautiful skiing terrain.

Due to its northern location, the village has a relatively long and cold winter.

== History ==
The village was the administrative center of the old Eresfjord og Vistdal Municipality from 1890 until 1964 when it was merged into Nesset Municipality. Sira Church which was opened in 1869, is the main church for the area, and it is located in the middle of the village of Eresfjord.
