= Eira (river) =

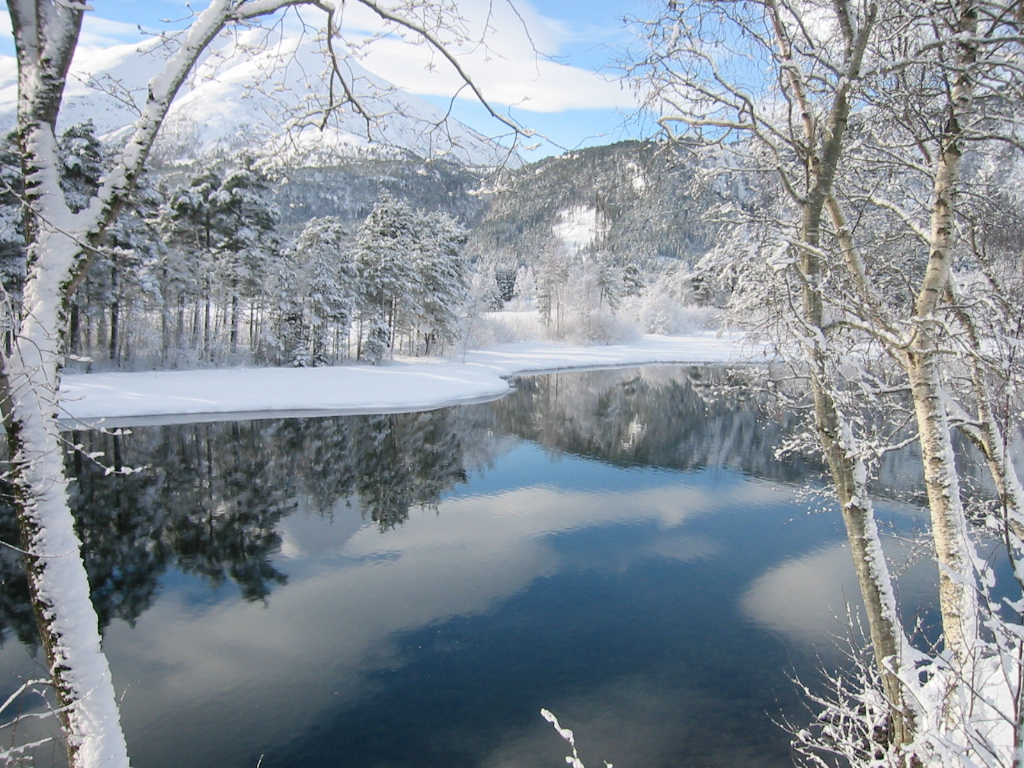
- Eira river in Eresfjord

Location
- Country: Norway
- County: Møre og Romsdal
- Municipalities: Molde Municipality

Physical characteristics
- Source: Eikesdalsvatnet
  - location: Osen, Molde Municipality
  - coordinates: 62.63159°N 8.10182°E
  - elevation: 22 metres (72 ft)
- Mouth: Eresfjorden
  - location: Syltebø, Molde Municipality
  - coordinates: 62.68495°N 8.13164°E
  - elevation: 0 metres (0 ft)
- Length: 7 km (4.3 mi)

Eira is a river in Molde Municipality in Møre og Romsdal county, Norway. The 7-kilometre (4.3 mi) long river flows from the lake Eikesdalsvatnet past the village of Eresfjord and into the Eresfjorden. The mountain Skjorta lies 5 kilometres (3.1 mi) east of the river.

Historically, the river was a bountiful salmon fishing area, but since it has become a regulated river for nearby hydro-electric power stations, the fish have not been as plentiful.

== See also ==
- List of rivers in Norway
