= Mardalsfossen =

Waterfall in Møre og Romsdal, Norway

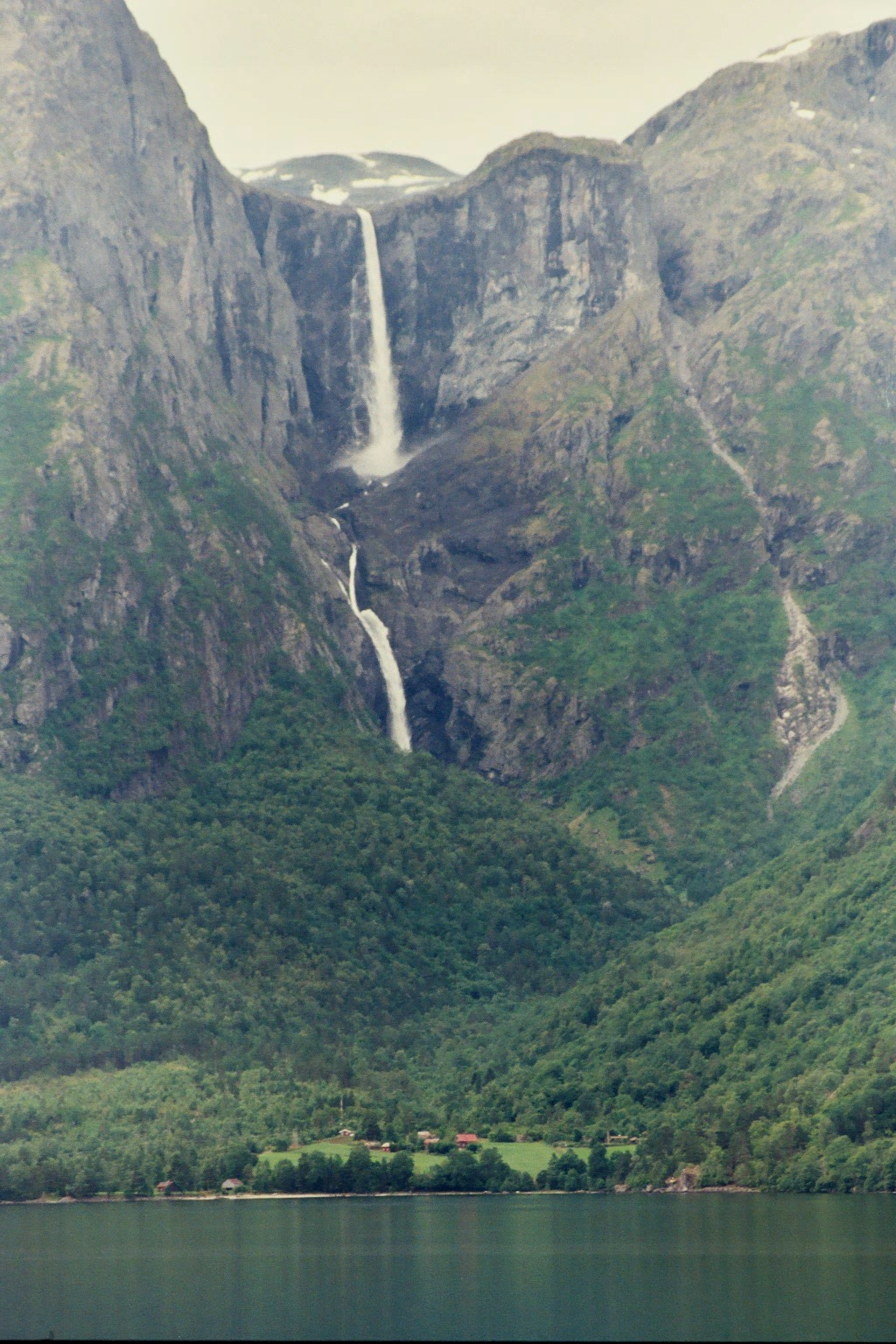
- View of the Mardalsfossen
- Location: Møre og Romsdal, Norway
- Coordinates: 62.4718943°N 8.119833472°E
- Type: Tiered
- Elevation: 907 metres (2,976 ft)
- Total height: 645 metres (2,116 ft)
- Number of drops: 2
- Longest drop: 320 metres (1,050 ft)
- Total width: 30 metres (98 ft)
- Average width: 12 metres (39 ft)
- Run: 244 metres (801 ft)
- Watercourse: Mardøla
- Average flow rate: 3 m^{3}/s (110 cu ft/s)

Mardalsfossen is a waterfall in Molde Municipality in Møre og Romsdal county, Norway. It is sometimes referred to as one of the tallest waterfalls in Europe. The falls are on the Mardøla river which flows out of a hanging valley into the lake Eikesdalsvatnet, about 2 kilometres (1.2 mi) northwest of the village of Eikesdalen. The waterfall was depicted in the coat of arms of the old Nesset Municipality.

The total fall is 705 metres (2,313 ft) according to SSB, 645 metres (2,116 ft) according to World Waterfall Database (WWD). WWD reports that the SSB typically includes the head measurement for waterfalls that are situated within a hydroelectric system, resulting in a greater height estimate. Mardalsfossen is a tiered waterfall consisting of two large drops and several smaller ones lower down. It is on average 12 metres (39 ft) wide, but it can reach up to 30 metres (98 ft) wide. The highest vertical drop is one of the tallest in Norway. As with figures for the total height, discrepancies have been reported in the estimated height of each vertical drop. According to the SSB, the upper vertical drop is 358 metres (1,175 ft), while the WWD surveyed it as 320 metres (1,050 ft).

The water, which has been tapped for hydroelectric use, flows over the falls during the summer tourist season of 20 June to 20 August. At other times the water is channeled through the hydroelectric scheme. The highest rate of flow ever recorded in the falls is 45 cubic metres per second (1,600 cu ft/s). Summer flow is currently limited to less than 3 cubic metres per second (110 cu ft/s).

In 1970 Arne Næss, the Norwegian founder of the Deep Ecology movement, tied himself with 300 others in protest against the building of a dam and the subsequent removal of the waterfall.

Between June 2014 and August 2015 Antony Gormley's Another Time was on view in the mist from the waterfall and formed the official start of the Mardalsfossen Art Project.

== Name ==
The first element is from the name of the valley Mardalen and the last element is the finite form of foss which means "waterfall". The name of the valley is a compound of an old river name Mara (now Mardøla) and the finite form of dal which means "dale" or "valley". The old name of the river is probably derived from the verb mara which means "rub", "grave", "dig" or "die."

== Gallery ==
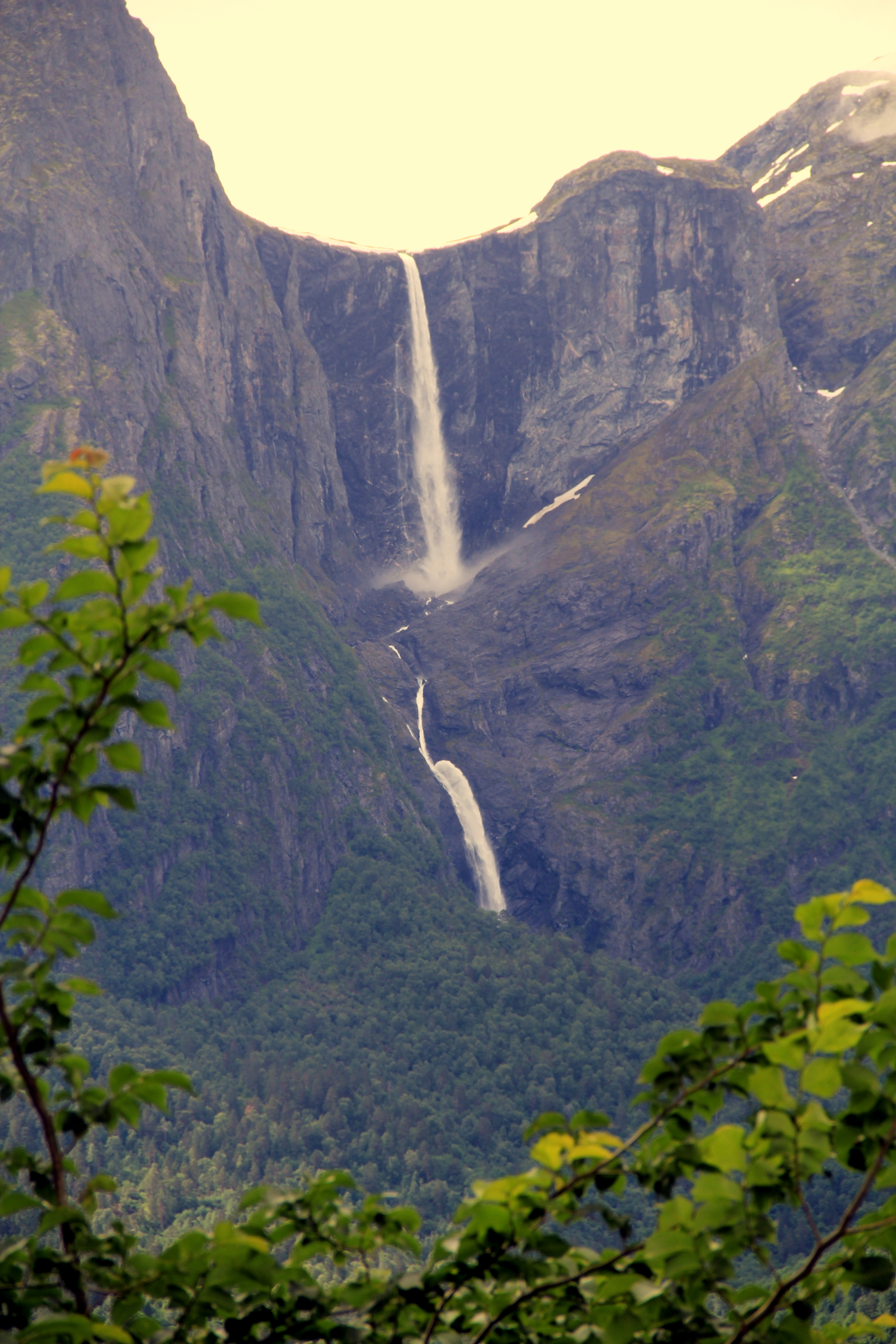

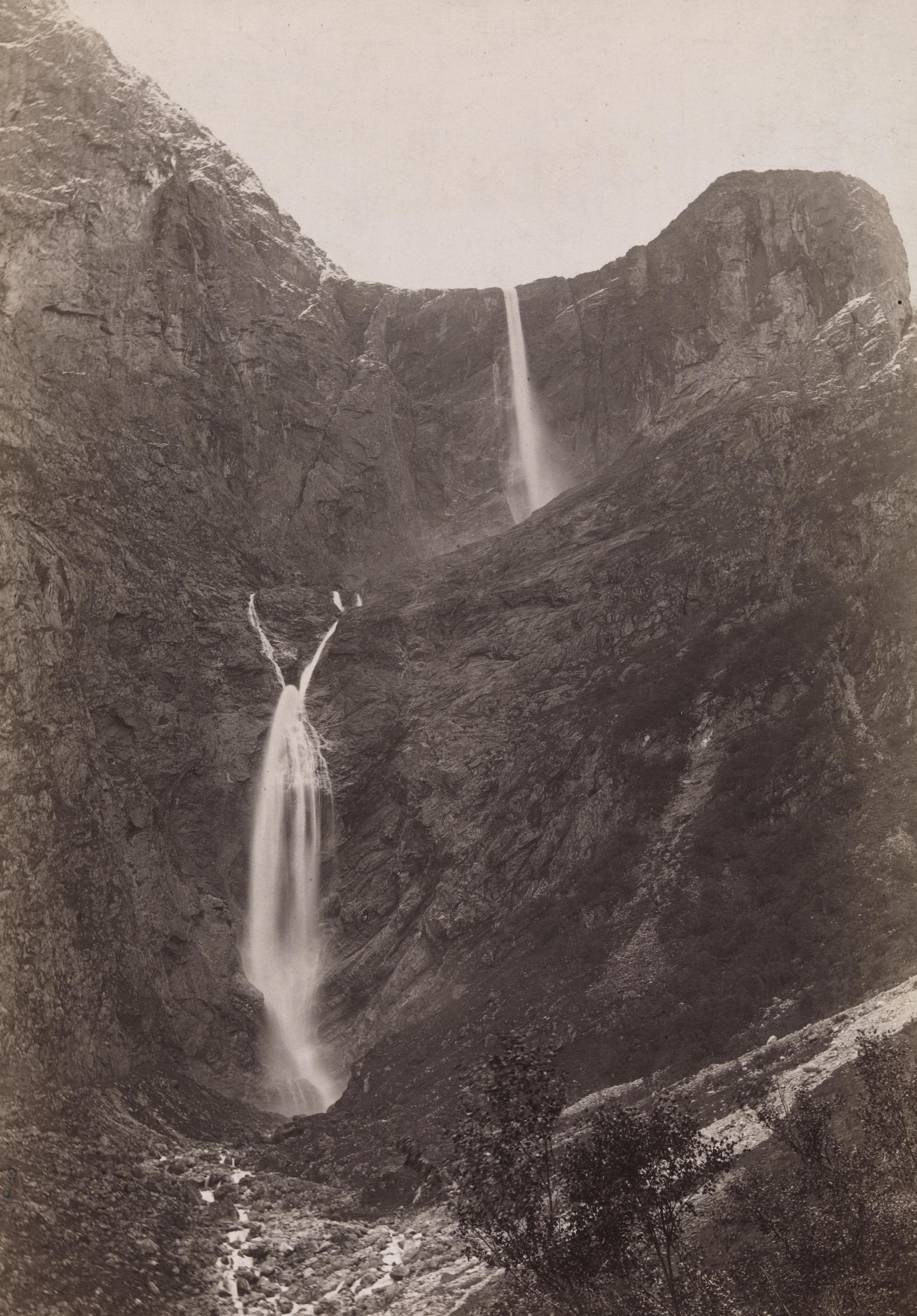

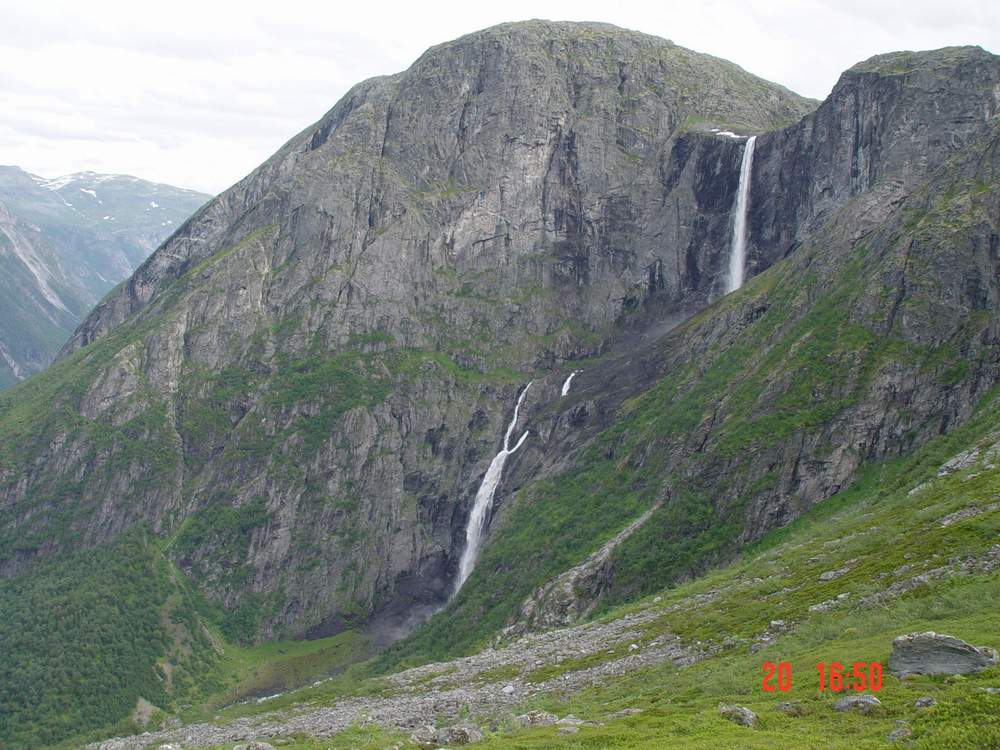

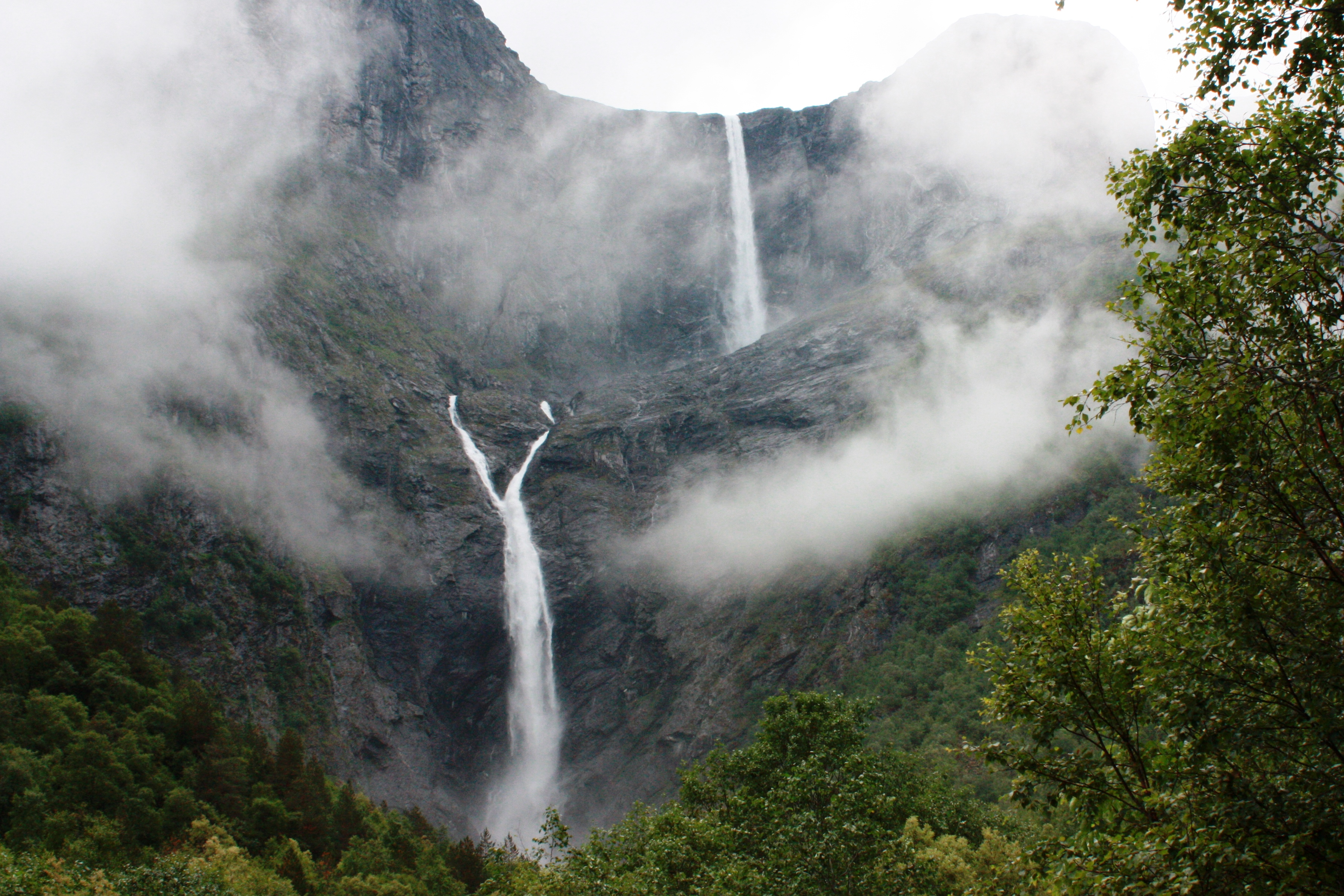

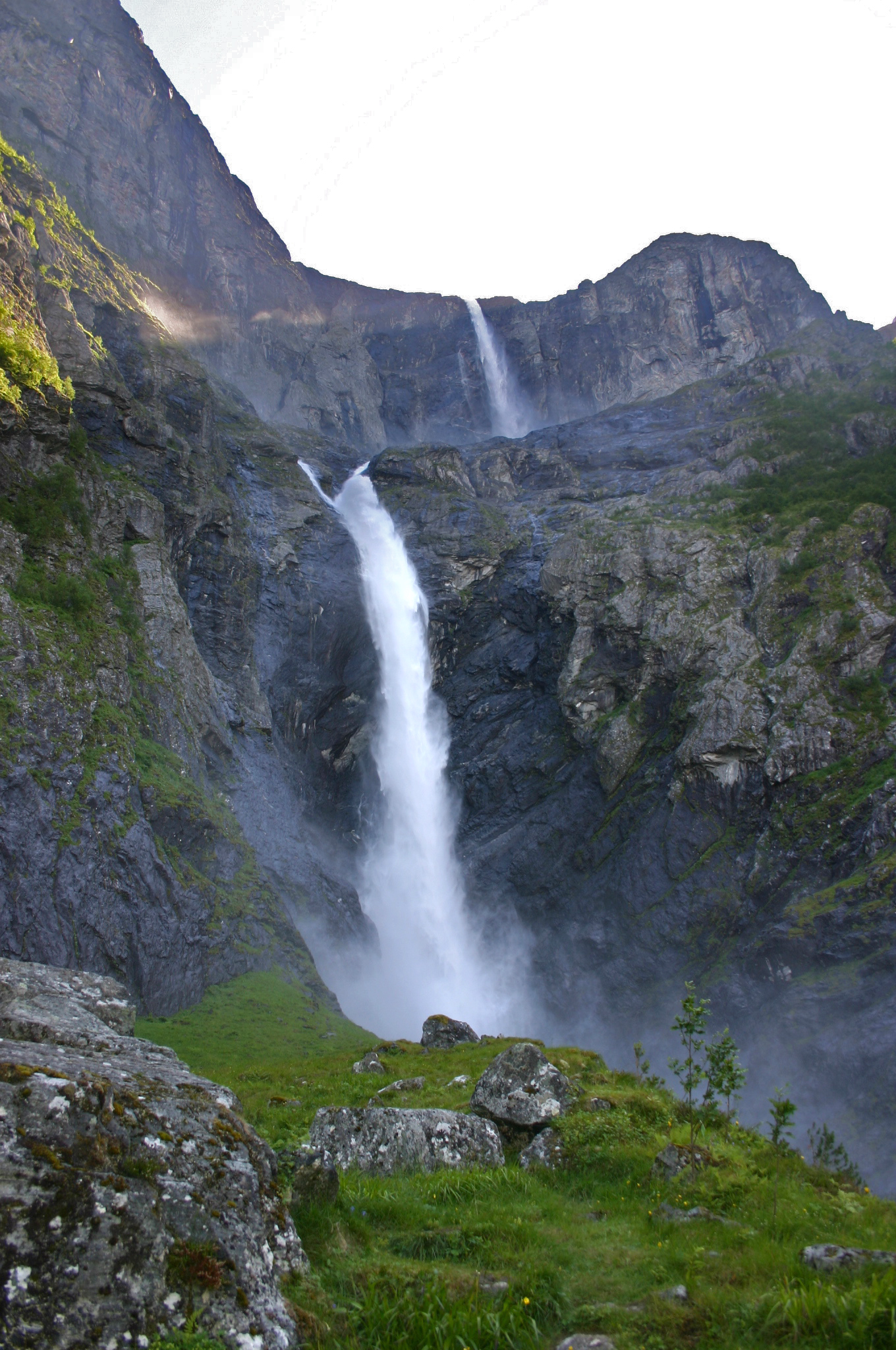

== See also ==
- List of waterfalls#Norway
