= Sira Church =

Church in Møre og Romsdal, Norway

Sira Church Eresfjord Church
- Sira kyrkje / Eresfjord kyrkje
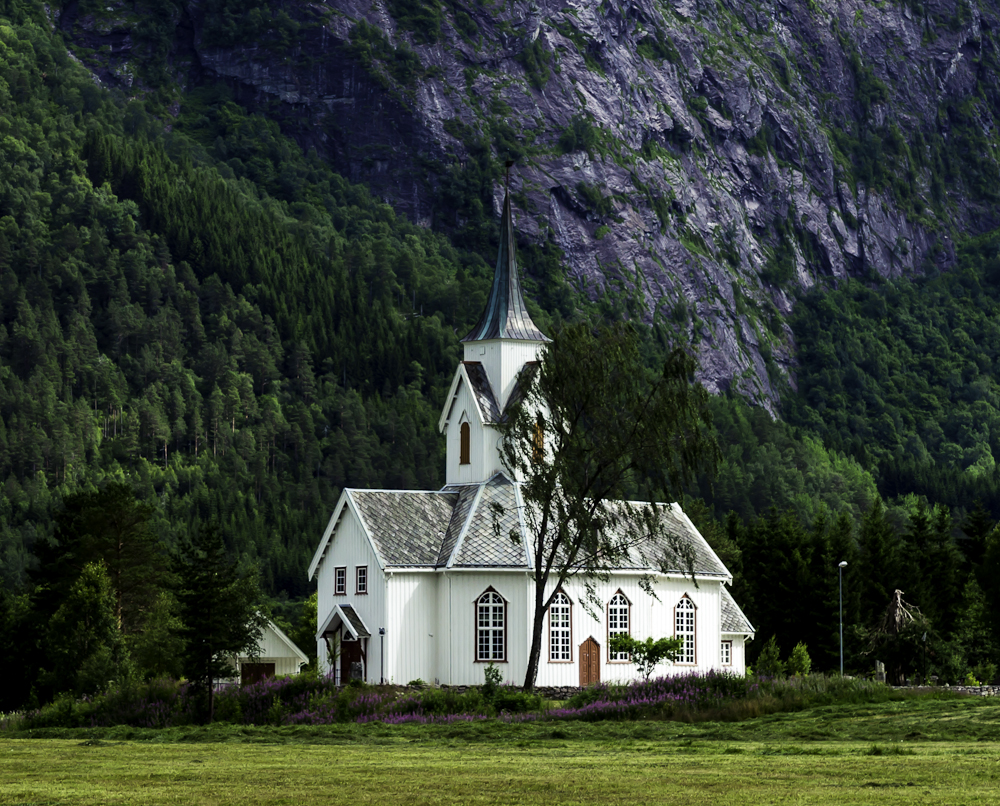
- View of the church
- Sira Church; Eresfjord Church
- 62°39′58″N 8°06′48″E
- Location: Molde Municipality, Møre og Romsdal
- Country: Norway
- Denomination: Church of Norway
- Churchmanship: Evangelical Lutheran

History
- Status: Parish church
- Founded: 14th century
- Consecrated: 29 September 1869.

Architecture
- Functional status: Active
- Architect: Christian H. Grosch
- Architectural type: Octagonal
- Completed: 1869 (157 years ago)

Specifications
- Capacity: 307
- Materials: Wood

Administration
- Diocese: Møre bispedømme
- Deanery: Molde domprosti
- Parish: Eresfjord
- Norwegian Cultural Heritage Site
- Type: Church
- Status: Listed
- ID: 85434

Sira Church (Norwegian: Sira kyrkje) or Eresfjord Church (Norwegian: Eresfjord kyrkje) is a parish church of the Church of Norway in Molde Municipality in Møre og Romsdal county, Norway. It is located in the village of Eresfjord. It is the church for the Eresfjord parish which is part of the Molde domprosti (arch-deanery) in the Diocese of Møre. The white, wooden church was built in an octagonal design in a neo-Gothic style in 1869 using plans drawn up by the architect Christian H. Grosch. The church seats 307 people.

== History ==
The earliest existing historical records of the church date back to the year 1426, but the church was not new that year. The first church in Eresfjord was a wooden stave church that was likely constructed in the 14th century. In 1647–1648, the church at Sira was renovated and expanded from a single-nave stave church into a building with a cruciform floor plan by adding two timber-framed transepts to the north and south. In 1651 the church got a new altarpiece, and in 1655 it got a new horizontal siding on the exterior of the building. The cross arms were tarred in 1658. Despite all the work done on the building in the 1650s, the church was still in poor condition, so much of the building walls and roof were reconstructed in 1661.

In 1708, one of the walls of the choir collapsed, so plans were made to replace the old church. In 1709, the old church was torn down and a brand new church was built on the same site using the old foundation from the previous church. The new building had a cruciform design and it was completed in 1710. The builder was Erik Jakobsen Holten. In an inspection in 1862, it was established that the church was both dilapidated and too small in relation to the population in the parish, so plans were made for replacing the building. In 1868, the old church was torn down and in 1869 the new church was completed on the same site. It was a wooden church with an octagonal floor plan. The building was designed by Christian H. Grosch. The new church was consecrated on 29 September 1869.

== Media gallery ==
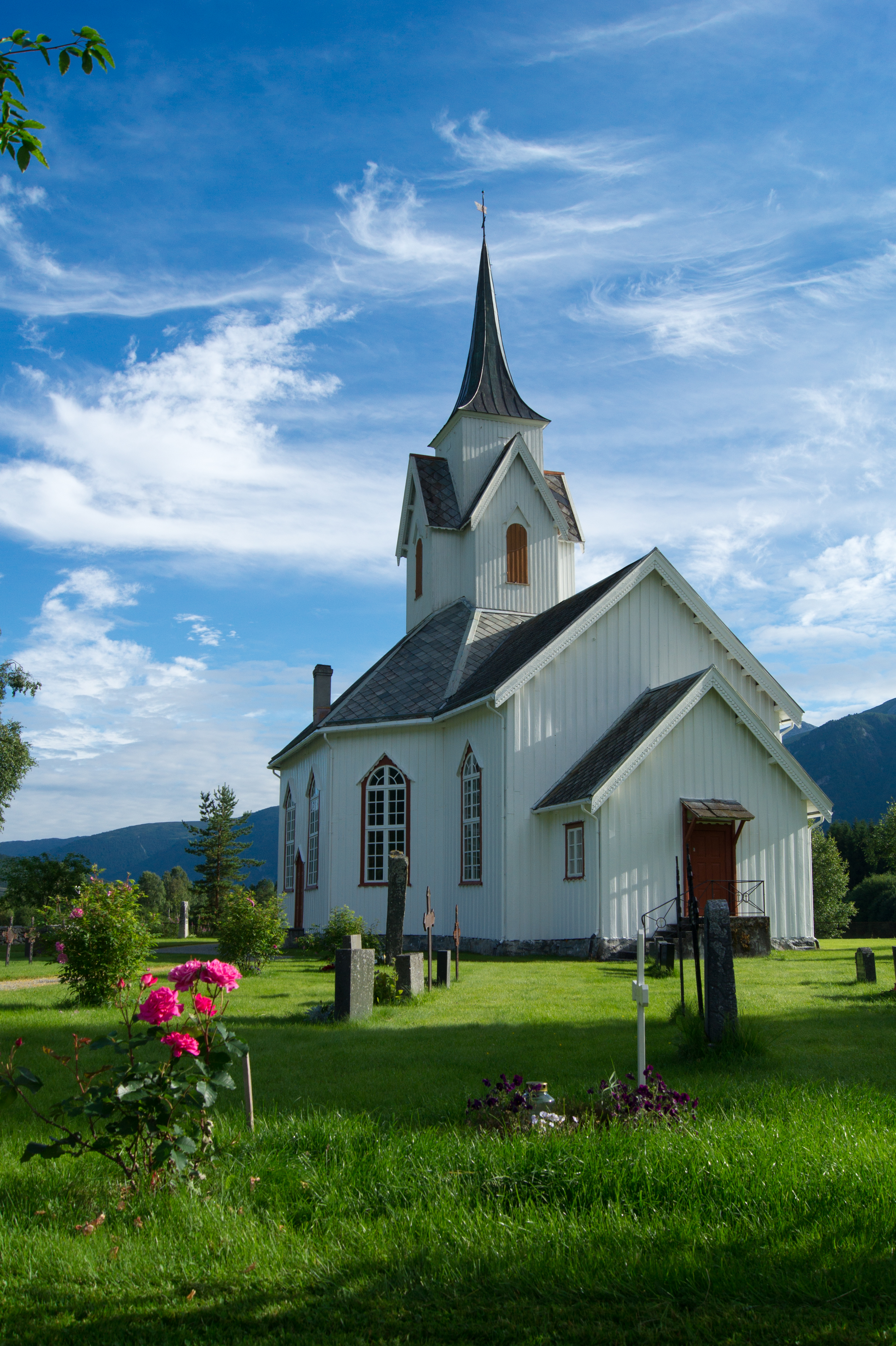

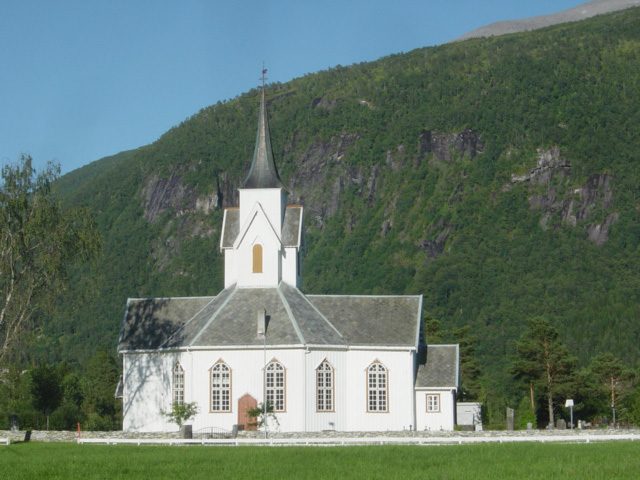

== See also ==
- List of churches in Møre
