= Vistdal Church =

Church in Møre og Romsdal, Norway

- Vistdal kyrkje
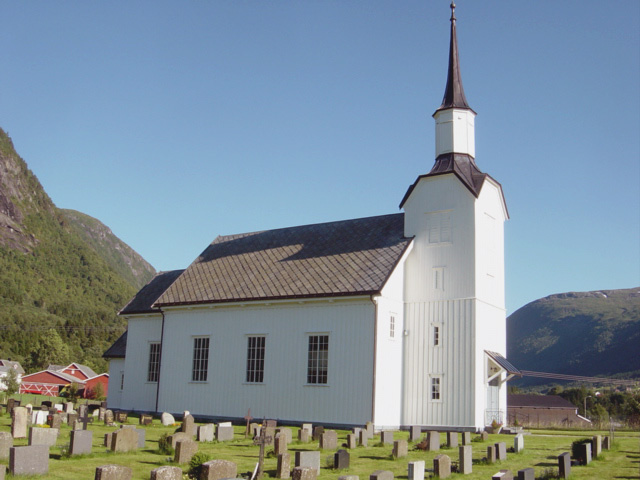
- View of the church
- Vistdal Church
- 62°43′14″N 7°56′09″E
- Location: Molde Municipality, Møre og Romsdal
- Country: Norway
- Denomination: Church of Norway
- Churchmanship: Evangelical Lutheran

History
- Status: Parish church
- Founded: 13th century
- Consecrated: 24 November 1869

Architecture
- Functional status: Active
- Architect: Jacob Wilhelm Nordan
- Architectural type: Long church
- Completed: 1869 (157 years ago)

Specifications
- Capacity: 270
- Materials: Wood

Administration
- Diocese: Møre bispedømme
- Deanery: Molde domprosti
- Parish: Vistdal
- Norwegian Cultural Heritage Site
- Type: Church
- Status: Automatically protected
- ID: 85858

Vistdal Church (Norwegian: Vistdal kyrkje) is a parish church of the Church of Norway in Molde Municipality in Møre og Romsdal county, Norway. It is located in the village of Myklebostad. It is the church for the Vistdal parish which is part of the Molde domprosti (arch-deanery) in the Diocese of Møre. The white, wooden church was built in a long church style in 1869 using plans by the architect Jacob Wilhelm Nordan. The church seats about 270 people.

== History ==
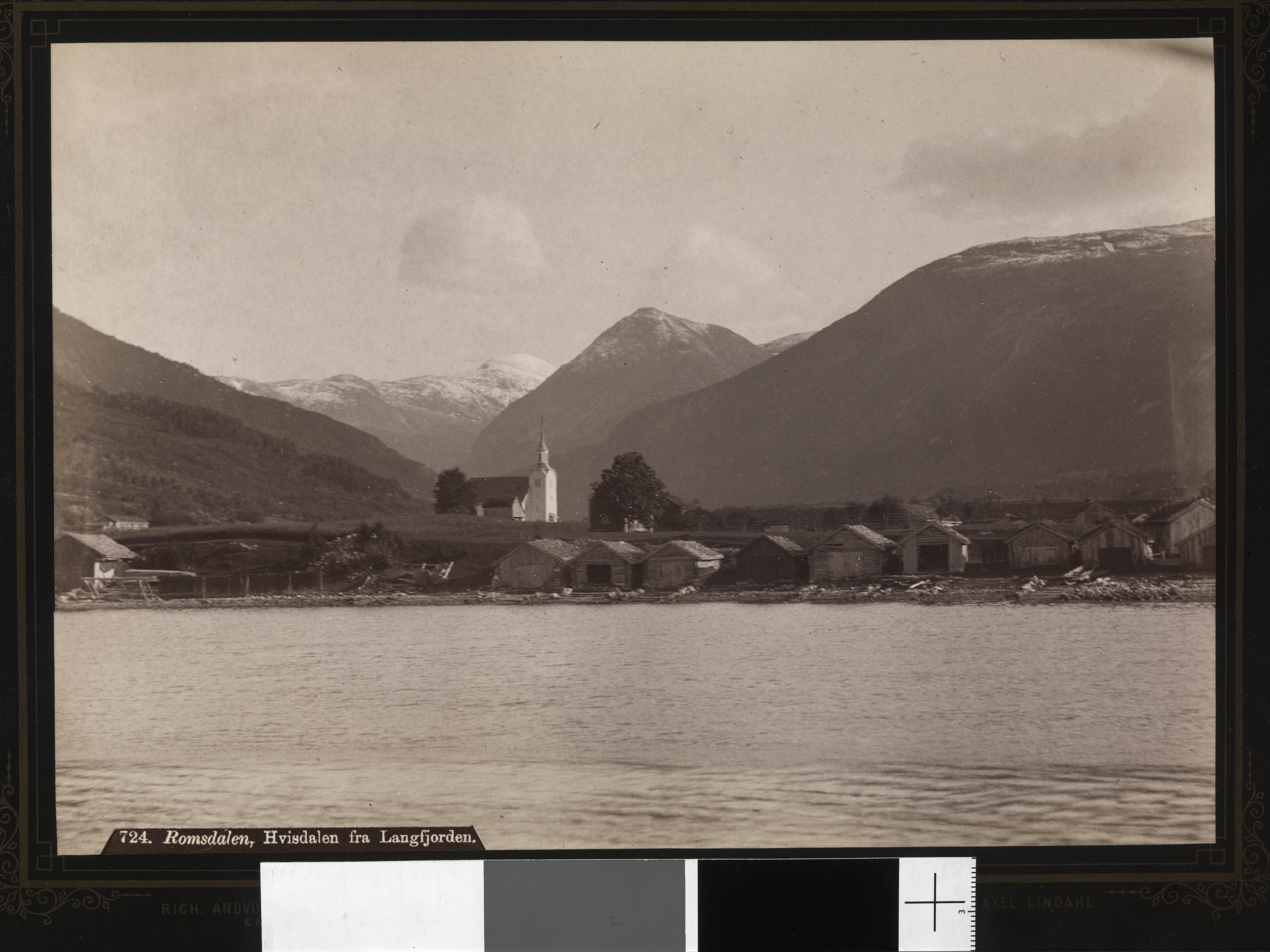
View of the church c. 1885

The earliest existing historical records of the church date back to the year 1432, but the church was not new that year. The first church in the Vistdal valley was a stave church located at Nerland, about 5 kilometres (3.1 mi) south of Myklebostad where the present church is located. The church may have been built during the 13th century. Sometime during the 15th or 16th centuries, a timber-framed sacristy and church porch were added to the building.

In the year 1661, the church was inspected and found to be quite dilapidated and no longer fit for use. From 1661 until 1668, a new church was constructed at Myklebostad, about 5 kilometres (3.1 mi) north of the existing church. The new church was a timber-framed cruciform building. The old church was torn down in the early 1660s and parts of the old church were reused in the construction of the new church. The lead builder was Jens Toresen. The new church had 42 rows of benches, but not much else is known about the interior. The pulpit was built in 1665 for the new church (the pulpit is now located in the chapel at the Romsdal Museum).

By the mid-1800s, the church was deemed to be too small for the parish. In 1869, a new church was built about 20 metres (66 ft) southeast of the existing church, just outside the cemetery that surrounded the old church. The new church was a wooden long church. It was designed by Jacob Wilhelm Nordan, and it is basically the same design as the Nord-Etnedal Church that Nordan had previously designed. The lead builder was the German-born master builder Friedrich Spolert from Molde, who employed Anders J. Hanset as the foreman for the project. The church was built in one month in 1869 and it was consecrated on 24 November 1869. Originally it was tarred on the exterior, but at some point, the exterior walls were covered with wooden siding and painted white.

== See also ==
- List of churches in Møre
