= Eikesdalsvatnet =

Lake in Møre og Romsdal, Norway

- Eikedalsvatnet
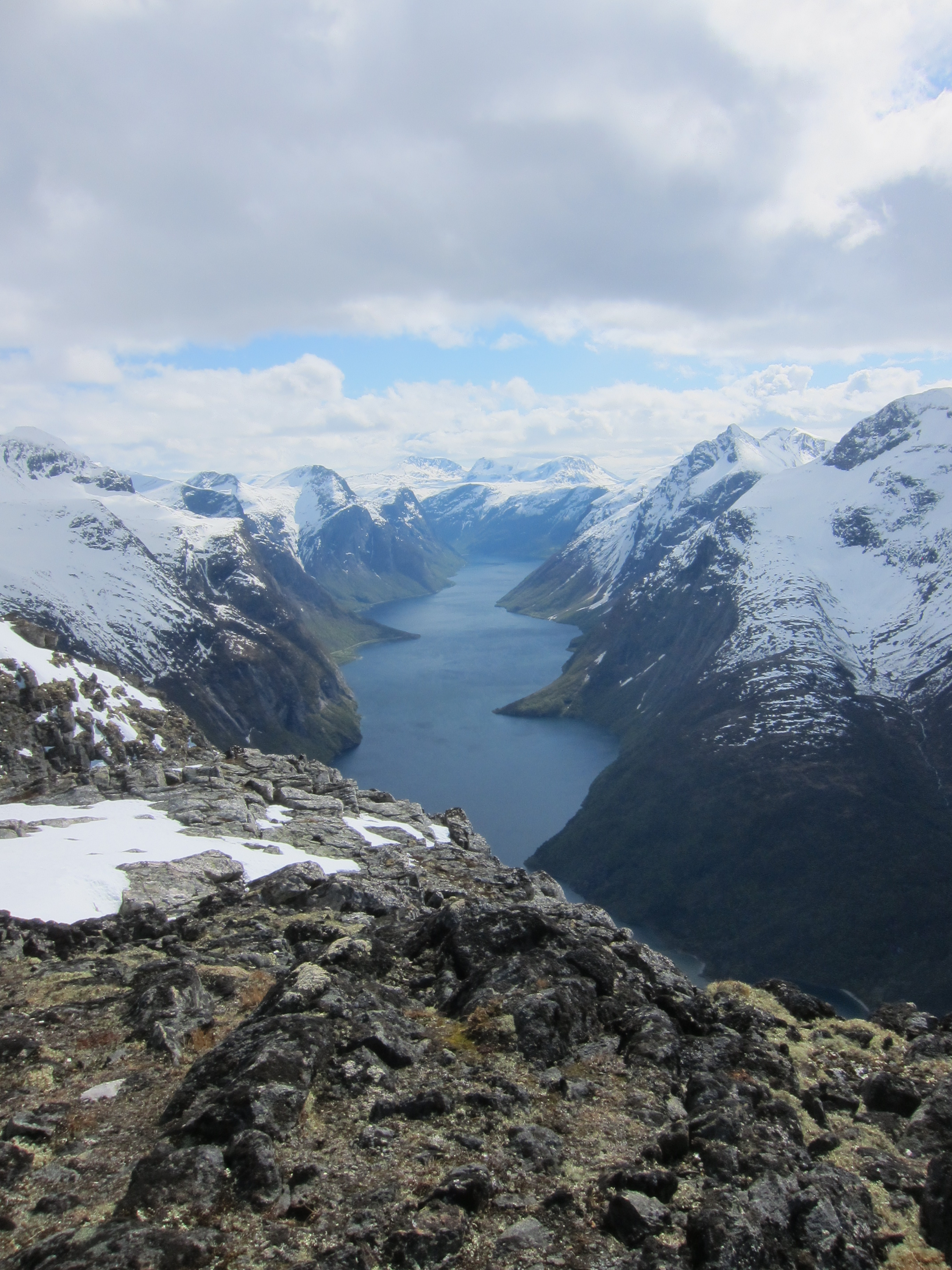
- View of the lake from the Goksøyra summit.
- Interactive map of the lake
- Location: Molde Municipality, Møre og Romsdal
- Coordinates: 62.56176°N 8.15752°E
- Primary inflows: Aura & Mardøla rivers
- Primary outflows: River Eira
- Basin countries: Norway
- Max. length: 18 km (11 mi)
- Max. width: 1.7 km (1.1 mi)
- Surface area: 23.15 km^{2} (8.94 sq mi)
- Max. depth: 155 m (509 ft)
- Shore length^{1}: 44 km (27 mi)
- Surface elevation: 22 m (72 ft)
- Settlements: Eikesdalen
- References: NVE
- ^{1} Shore length is not a well-defined measure.

Eikesdalsvatnet is a lake in Molde Municipality in Møre og Romsdal county, Norway. The lake is long and narrow, roughly 18 kilometres (11 mi) in length, and it is the largest lake in Møre og Romsdal county. The village of Eikesdalen is located at the southern end of the lake.

The average depth of the lake is 89 metres (292 ft), which is 67 metres (220 ft) below sea level, which means most of the lake's volume is located below sea level.

Its main inflows are the river Aura, flowing northwest from the lake Aursjøen, and the river Mardøla with the famous waterfall Mardalsfossen. The lake flows out through the River Eira which flows into the Eresfjorden. The lake is surrounded by 1,500-to-1,800-metre (4,900 to 5,900 ft) tall mountains like Juratinden and Fløtatinden.

== See also ==
- List of lakes in Norway
