= Langfjorden (Møre og Romsdal) =

Fjord in Møre og Romsdal, Norway

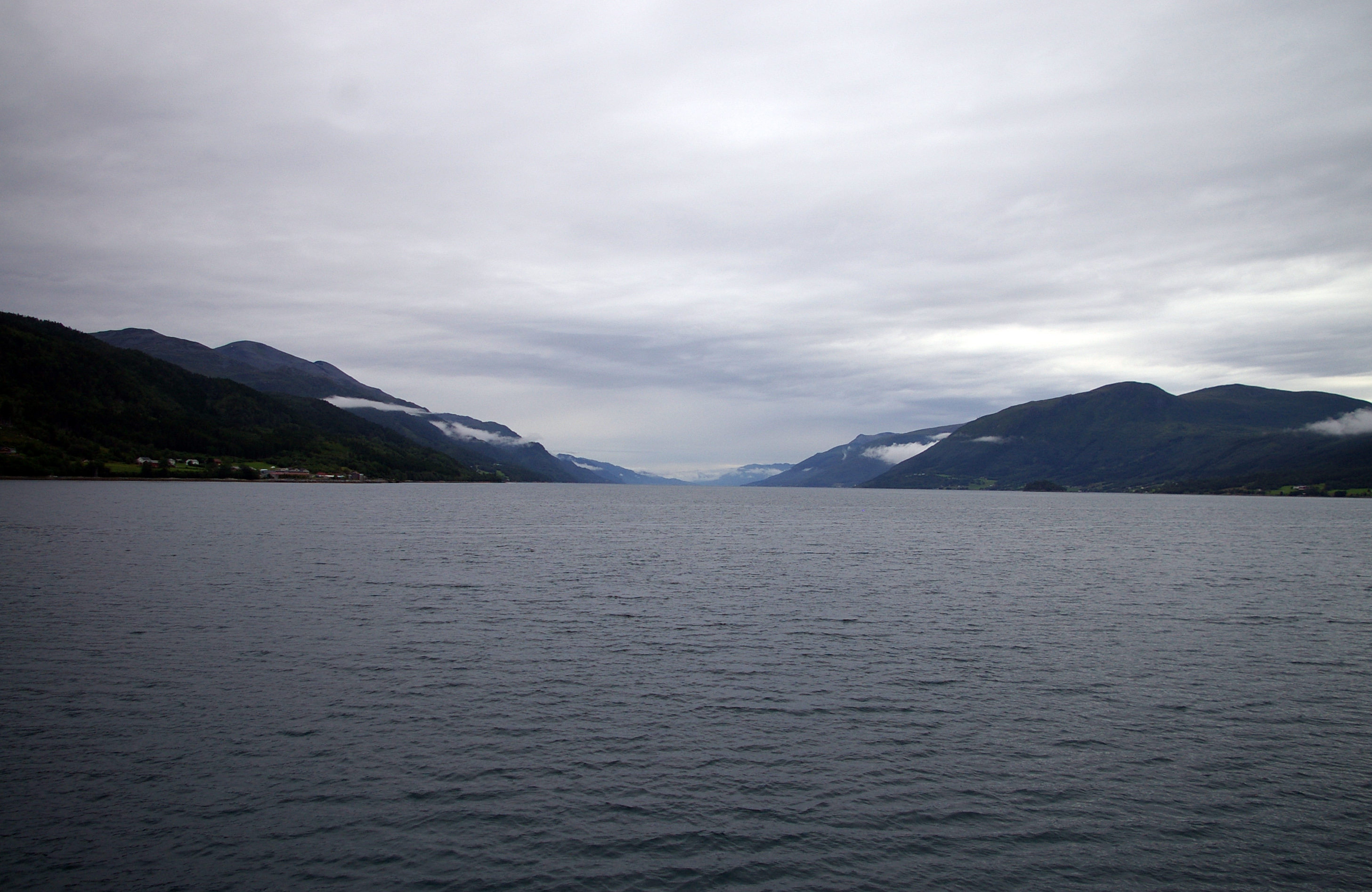
- View of the fjord
- Interactive map of the fjord
- Location: Møre og Romsdal county, Norway
- Coordinates: 62.6411°N 7.4159°E
- Type: Fjord
- Primary inflows: Eresfjorden
- Primary outflows: Romsdalsfjorden
- Basin countries: Norway
- Max. length: 35 kilometres (22 mi)
- Max. width: 3 kilometres (1.9 mi)

Langfjorden is a fjord in Møre og Romsdal county, Norway. The 35-kilometre (22 mi) long fjord is an arm of the large Romsdalsfjorden which begins between the most easterly point on the island of Sekken in Molde Municipality and Okseneset in Rauma Municipality. The fjord then continues to the east to the village of Eidsvåg in Molde Municipality.

The fjord's two arms, Eresfjorden at east end and Rødvenfjorden at the west end are oriented to the south. The fjord is crossed by the Åfarnes–Sølsnes Ferry, as part of County Road 64. The Langfjord Tunnel is a proposed undersea tunnel that would replace the ferry. The village of Mittet in Rauma Municipality lies on the south shore of the fjord.

== Landslide ==
Just before 8:00 p.m. on 22 February 1756, a landslide with a volume of 12,000,000 to 15,000,000 cubic metres (16,000,000 to 20,000,000 cubic yards) — the largest known landslide in Norway in historic time — traveled at high speed from a height of 400 metres (1,312 ft) on the side of the mountain Tjellafjellet into the Langfjorden about 1 kilometre (0.6 mi) west of Tjelle and between Tjelle and Gramsgrø. The slide generated three megatsunamis in the Langfjorden and the Eresfjorden with heights of 40 to 50 metres (131 to 164 ft). The waves flooded the shore for 200 metres (660 ft) inland in some areas, destroying farms and other inhabited areas. Damaging waves struck as far away as Veøya, 25 kilometres (16 mi) from the landslide — where they washed inland 20 metres (66 ft) above normal flood levels — and Gjermundnes, 40 kilometres (25 mi) from the slide. The waves killed 32 people and destroyed 168 buildings, 196 boats, large amounts of forest, and roads and boat landings.

== See also ==
- List of Norwegian fjords
