= Eresfjorden =

Fjord in Møre og Romsdal, Norway

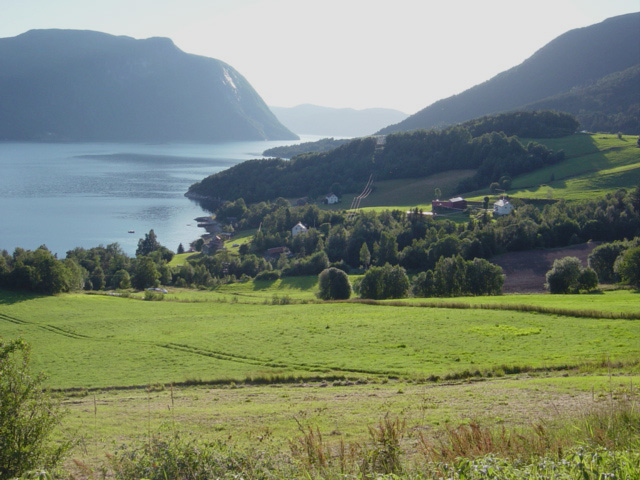
- View of the Eresfjorden from Boggestranda
- Interactive map of the fjord
- Location: Møre og Romsdal county, Norway
- Coordinates: 62.730°N 8.064°E
- Type: Fjord
- Basin countries: Norway
- Max. length: 10 kilometres (6.2 mi)
- Max. width: 2.5 kilometres (1.6 mi)

Eresfjorden is a fjord in Molde Municipality in Møre og Romsdal county, Norway. It is a 10-kilometre (6.2 mi) long branch off of the main Langfjorden, which is itself a branch off the great Romsdal Fjord. The fjord begins at the mouth of the Eira River near the village of Eresfjord, and then it flows north to meet the Langfjorden near the villages of Eidsvåg and Boggestranda.

== Landslide ==
Just before 8:00 p.m. on 22 February 1756, a landslide with a volume of 12,000,000 to 15,000,000 cubic metres (16,000,000 to 20,000,000 cubic yards) — the largest known landslide in Norway in historic times — traveled at high speed from a height of 400 metres (1,312 ft) on the side of the mountain Tjellafjellet into the Langfjorden about 1 kilometre (0.6 mi) west of Tjelle and between Tjelle and Gramsgrø. The slide generated three megatsunamis in the Langfjorden and the Eresfjorden with heights of 40 to 50 metres (131 to 164 ft). The waves flooded the shore for 200 metres (660 ft) inland in some areas, destroying farms and other inhabited areas, killing 32 people and destroying 168 buildings, 196 boats, large amounts of forest, and roads and boat landings.

== See also ==
- List of Norwegian fjords
