= Tresfjord =

Tresfjord or Tresfjorden may refer to:

- Tresfjord (village), a village in Vestnes municipality in Møre og Romsdal county, Norway
- Tresfjord Municipality, a former municipality in Møre og Romsdal county, Norway (known as Sylte Municipality from 1899 to 1922)
- Tresfjorden, a fjord in Vestnes municipality in Møre og Romsdal county, Norway
- Tresfjord Church, a church in Vestnes municipality in Møre og Romsdal county, Norway
- Tresfjord Bridge, a bridge in Vestnes municipalit in Møre og Romsdal county, Norway
