= Vestnes =

Vestnes may refer to:

== Places ==
- Vestnes (village), a village within Vestnes Municipality in Møre og Romsdal county, Norway
- Vestnes Municipality, a municipality in Møre og Romsdal county, Norway
- Vestnes Church, a church in Vestnes Municipality in Møre og Romsdal county, Norway
- Vestnes, Mandal, a borough within the town of Mandal in Lindesnes Municipality, Agder county, Norway

== Other ==
- Vestnes Varfjell IL, a sports club based in Vestnes Municipality in Møre og Romsdal county, Norway
