= Vågstranda =

Village in Rauma Municipality, Norway

- Village
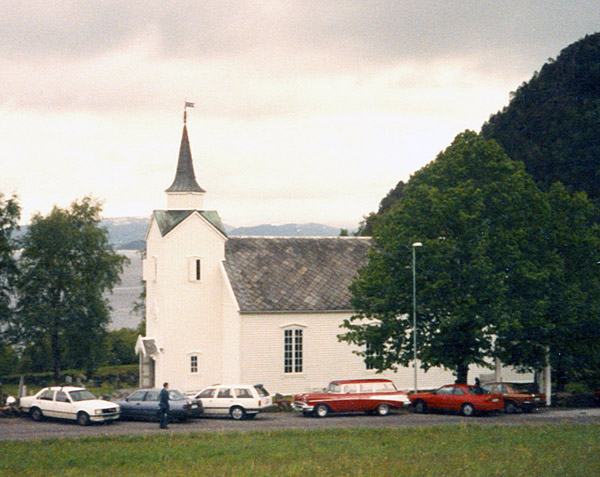
- Vågstranda church
- Interactive map of Vågstranda
- Location within Møre og Romsdal Location within Norway
- Coordinates: 62.6050°N 7.3164°E
- Country: Norway
- Region: Western Norway
- County: Møre og Romsdal
- District: Romsdal
- Municipality: Vestnes Municipality
- Elevation: 39 m (128 ft)
- Time zone: UTC+01:00 (CET)
  - Summer (DST): UTC+02:00 (CEST)
- Post Code: 6387 Vågstranda

Vågstranda is a village along Romsdal Fjord in Vestnes Municipality in Møre og Romsdal county, Norway. It is located along the European route E136 highway, about 10 kilometres (6.2 mi) north of the village of Måndalen (in Rauma Municipality) and 11 kilometres (6.8 mi) east of the village of Vikebukt. Vågstranda Church, built in 1870, is located in the village.

The village was part of Rauma Municipality until 1 January 2021 when it was switched to the neighboring Vestnes Municipality.
