= Tresfjord Municipality =

Former municipality in Møre og Romsdal, Norway

Tresfjord Municipality Tresfjord herad
- Former municipality
- Sylte herred (historic name)
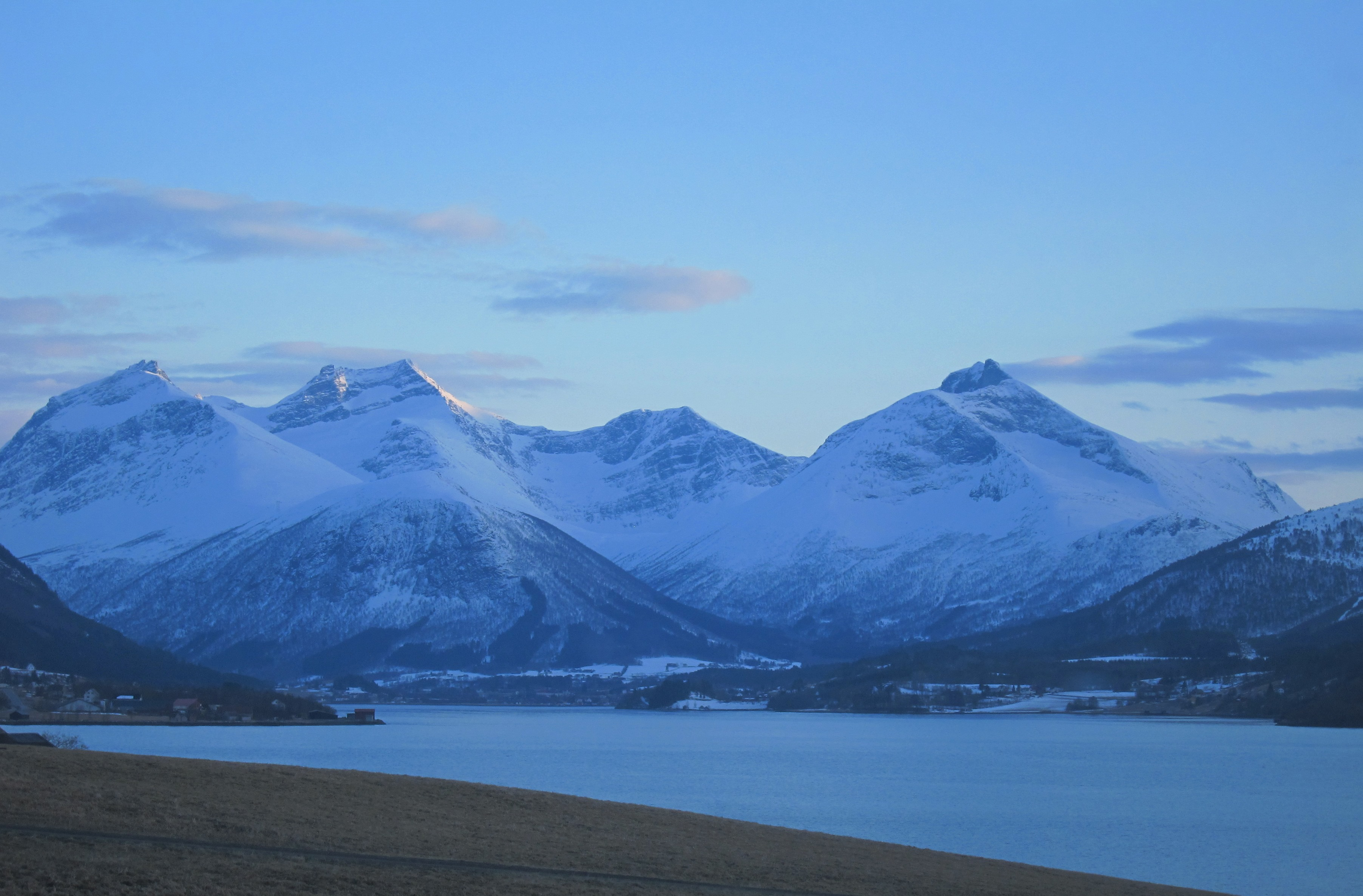
- View of the Tresfjorden area

- Møre og Romsdal within Norway

- Tresfjord within Møre og Romsdal
- Coordinates: 62°31′14″N 07°07′23″E
- Country: Norway
- County: Møre og Romsdal
- District: Romsdal
- Established: 1 Jan 1899
  - Preceded by: Vestnes Municipality
- Disestablished: 1 Jan 1964
  - Succeeded by: Vestnes Municipality
- Administrative centre: Tresfjord

Government
  - Mayor (1959–1963): Peder B. Hjelvik (Sp)

Area (upon dissolution)
  - Total: 193.3 km^{2} (74.6 sq mi)
  - Rank: #378 in Norway
- Highest elevation: 1,467.83 m (4,815.7 ft)

Population (1963)
  - Total: 1,341
  - Rank: #559 in Norway
  - Density: 6.9/km^{2} (18/sq mi)
  - Change (10 years): ▲ +1.1%
- Demonym: Tresfjording

Official language
  - Norwegian form: Nynorsk
- Time zone: UTC+01:00 (CET)
  - Summer (DST): UTC+02:00 (CEST)
- ISO 3166 code: NO-1536

Tresfjord is former municipality in Møre og Romsdal county, Norway. The municipality existed from 1899 until its dissolution in 1964. It encompassed about 193.3 square kilometres (74.6 sq mi) in the southern part of the present-day Vestnes Municipality. The municipality included the Skorgedalen valley and the area surrounding both sides of the southern half of the Tresfjorden. The village of Tresfjord was the administrative centre of the municipality, and it was the location of Tresfjord Church, the main church for the municipality.

Prior to its dissolution in 1963, the 193.3-square-kilometre (74.6 sq mi) municipality was the 378th largest by area out of the 689 municipalities in Norway. Tresfjord Municipality was the 559th most populous municipality in Norway with a population of about 1,341. The municipality's population density was 6.9 inhabitants per square kilometre (18/sq mi) and its population had increased by 1.1% over the previous 10-year period.

== General information ==
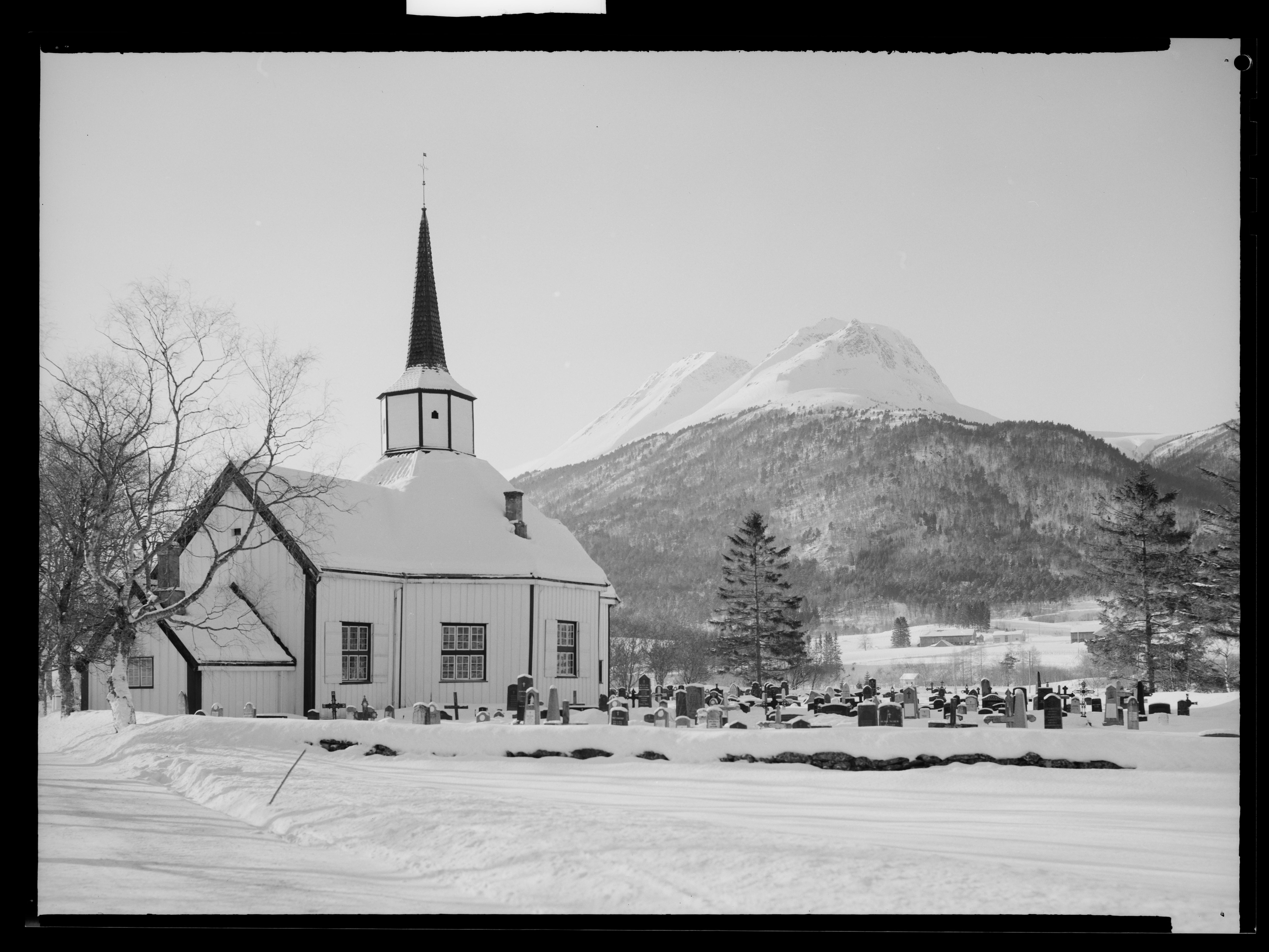
View of the Tresfjord Church

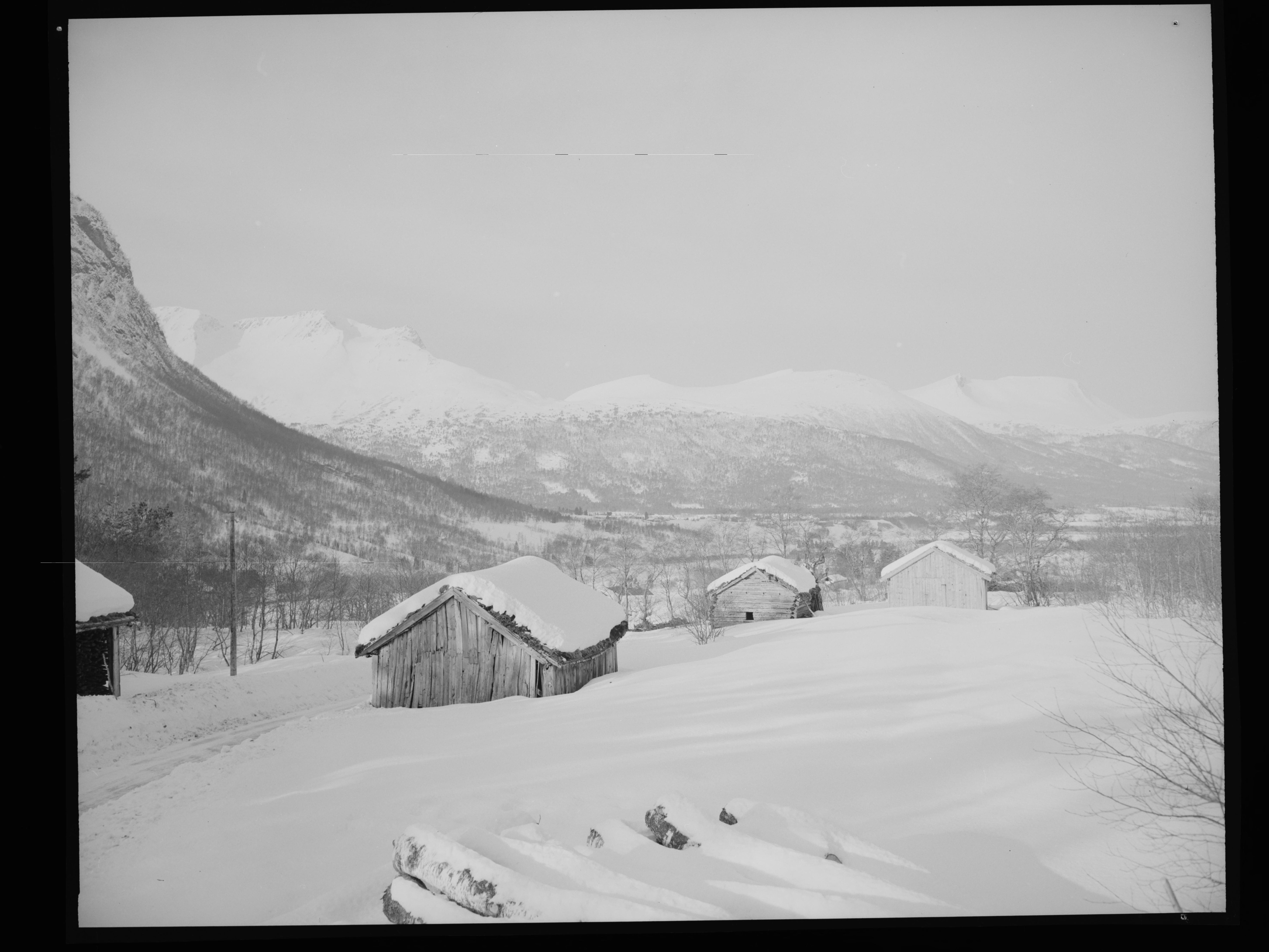
Winter view in Tresfjord (before 1956)

The municipality of Sylte was established on 1 January 1899 when the large Vestnes Municipality was divided into two: Sylte Municipality (population: 1,408) was in the south and a much smaller Vestnes Municipality (population: 2,348) in the north. On 28 April 1922, the municipal name was changed by a royal resolution to Tresfjord Municipality.

During the 1960s, there were many municipal mergers across Norway due to the work of the Schei Committee. On 1 January 1964, Tresfjord Municipality (population: 1,319) was merged with Vestnes Municipality (population: 3,895), creating a new, larger Vestnes Municipality.

=== Name ===
The municipality (originally the parish) was first named Sylte. This comes from the old Sylte farm (Old Norse: Sultar) since the first Sylte Church was built there. The name comes from the genitive case of the word sultr which means "hunger" or "famine", possibly referring to a swampy area near the farm that is not suitable for farming.

On 26 April 1922, a royal resolution changed the name of the municipality to Tresfjord. The new name was taken from the local fjord, Tresfjorden (Old Norse: Þræsir). The main village in the municipality was located at the head of the fjord and it was also named Tresfjord. The first element comes from the local river Tressa. This name is probably derived from the word træsa which means "to walk restlessly back and forth" or "to trot about". This likely refers to the strong current in the fjord. The last element is fjord which means "fjord".

=== Churches ===
The Church of Norway had one parish (sokn) within Tresfjord Municipality. At the time of the municipal dissolution, it was part of the Vestnes prestegjeld and the Indre Romsdal prosti (deanery) in the Diocese of Nidaros.

Churches in Tresfjord Municipality
Parish (sokn)	Church name	Location of the church	Year built
Tresfjord	Tresfjord Church	Tresfjord	1828

== Geography ==
The municipality included the Skorgedalen valley and the area surrounding both sides of the southern half of the Tresfjorden. Vestnes Municipality was to the north, Veøy Municipality was to the northeast, Voll Municipality was to the southeast, Stordal Municipality was to the south, and Ørskog Municipality was to the west. The highest point in the municipality was the 1,467.83-metre (4,815.7 ft) tall mountain Sandfjellet, located on the municipal border with Voll Municipality and Stordal Municipality.

== Government ==
While it existed, Tresfjord Municipality was responsible for primary education (through 10th grade), outpatient health services, senior citizen services, welfare and other social services, zoning, economic development, and municipal roads and utilities. The municipality was governed by a municipal council of directly elected representatives. The mayor was indirectly elected by a vote of the municipal council. The municipality was under the jurisdiction of the Frostating Court of Appeal.

=== Municipal council ===
The municipal council (Heradsstyre) of Tresfjord Municipality was made up of 13 representatives that were elected to four year terms. The tables below show the historical composition of the council by political party.

Tresfjord heradsstyre 1959–1963
Party name (in Nynorsk)	Number of representatives
Labour Party (Arbeidarpartiet)	4
Christian Democratic Party (Kristeleg Folkeparti)	2
Centre Party (Senterpartiet)	6
Liberal Party (Venstre)	1
Total number of members:	13
Note: On 1 January 1964, Tresfjord Municipality became part of Vestnes Municipality.

Tresfjord heradsstyre 1955–1959
Party name (in Nynorsk)	Number of representatives
Labour Party (Arbeidarpartiet)	5
Christian Democratic Party (Kristeleg Folkeparti)	2
Farmers' Party (Bondepartiet)	5
Liberal Party (Venstre)	1
Total number of members:	13

Tresfjord heradsstyre 1951–1955
Party name (in Nynorsk)	Number of representatives
Labour Party (Arbeidarpartiet)	4
Farmers' Party (Bondepartiet)	5
Liberal Party (Venstre)	3
Total number of members:	12

Tresfjord heradsstyre 1947–1951
Party name (in Nynorsk)	Number of representatives
Labour Party (Arbeidarpartiet)	4
Farmers' Party (Bondepartiet)	8
Total number of members:	12

Tresfjord heradsstyre 1945–1947
Party name (in Nynorsk)	Number of representatives
Labour Party (Arbeidarpartiet)	4
Farmers' Party (Bondepartiet)	5
Liberal Party (Venstre)	3
Total number of members:	12

Tresfjord heradsstyre 1937–1941*
Party name (in Nynorsk)	Number of representatives
Labour Party (Arbeidarpartiet)	5
Farmers' Party (Bondepartiet)	4
Liberal Party (Venstre)	3
Total number of members:	12
Note: Due to the German occupation of Norway during World War II, no elections were held for new municipal councils until after the war ended in 1945.

=== Mayors ===
The mayor (Nynorsk: ordførar) of Tresfjord Municipality was the political leader of the municipality and the chairperson of the municipal council. The following people have held this position:

- 1899–1907: Martinus P. Sylte
- 1908–1910: Knut H. Sylte
- 1911–1913: Jakob O. Rypdal
- 1913–1916: Knut Johnsen Nerheim (V)
- 1917–1919: Lars P. Nerheim
- 1919–1931: Peter Syltebø
- 1932–1937: Lars P. Nerheim
- 1938–1941: Peter J. Rypdal
- 1941–1943: Olav Rekdal (NS)
- 1943–1945: Nils Kjersem (NS)
- 1946–1952: Peter J. Rypdal
- 1952–1955: Peder B. Hjelvik (Bp)
- 1955–1959: Jakob Rypdal
- 1959–1963: Peder B. Hjelvik (Sp)

== See also ==
- List of former municipalities of Norway
- Vestnes Municipality#Notable_people
