= Peter L. Rypdal =

- Born: Peter Larsson Rypdal; 10 February 1909; Tresfjord, Norway
- Died: 9 January 1988 (aged 78) Tresfjord, Norway
- Genres: Traditional
- Occupations: Musician, composer
- Instruments: Hardingfele, violin, vocals

Peter Larsson Rypdal (10 February 1909 – 9 January 1988) was a Norwegian fiddler and famous traditional folk music composer.

Rypdal was born and died at Tresfjord in Møre og Romsdal, Norway. Of the many pieces he composed, two of his wedding marches are still used widely in Norway. In addition to folk music, he had a great interest in classical music, and this interest he shared with his friend Henry Vike (1921–2013), to whom he dedicated the wedding march "A Summer Wedding". Along with musically interested friends he was involved in forming a separate Symphony Orchestra of Tresfjord and Vestnes (1949–64). He already had a string quartet going for many years, which was a popular entertainment performances at many events, and was also a founding member of "Romsdal spelemannslag" (1936).

Rypdal was inspired by Sigbjørn Bernhoft Osa (1910–1990). He got to meet with the violinist several times when Osa was on tour in the area. Osa also used the opportunity to learn tunes from Rypdal who was often at Osa's concert repertoire.

== Personal life ==
He has several musician descendants including his grandchildren, Jorun Marie Kvernberg and Ola Kvernberg.
