= Vestnes Municipality =

Municipality in Møre og Romsdal, Norway

Vestnes Municipality Vestnes kommune
- Municipality
- Væstnes herred (historic name)
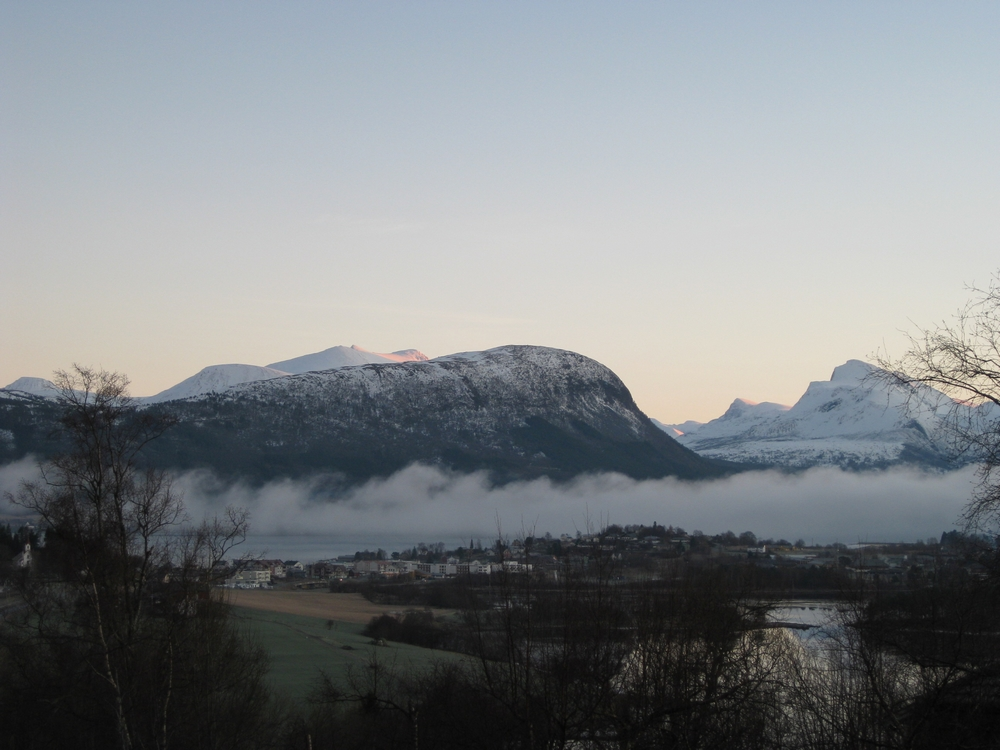
- View of Vestnes with mountains in the background

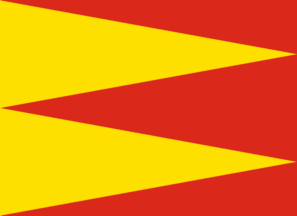
- Flag Coat of arms

- Møre og Romsdal within Norway

- Vestnes within Møre og Romsdal
- Coordinates: 62°35′04″N 07°01′06″E
- Country: Norway
- County: Møre og Romsdal
- District: Romsdal
- Established: 1 Jan 1838
  - Created as: Formannskapsdistrikt
- Administrative centre: Vestnes

Government
  - Mayor (2023): Randi Bergundhaugen (H)

Area
  - Total: 404.59 km^{2} (156.21 sq mi)
  - Land: 399.23 km^{2} (154.14 sq mi)
  - Water: 5.36 km^{2} (2.07 sq mi) 1.3%
  - Rank: #238 in Norway
- Highest elevation: 1,467.83 m (4,815.7 ft)

Population (2024)
  - Total: 7,147
  - Rank: #144 in Norway
  - Density: 17.7/km^{2} (46/sq mi)
  - Change (10 years): ▲ +8%
- Demonym: Vestnesing

Official language
  - Norwegian form: Nynorsk
- Time zone: UTC+01:00 (CET)
  - Summer (DST): UTC+02:00 (CEST)
- ISO 3166 code: NO-1535
- Website: Official website

Vestnes is a municipality in Møre og Romsdal county, Norway. Vestnes is part of the traditional district of Romsdal. The administrative centre of the municipality is the village of Vestnes. Other villages in the municipality include Vikebukt, Vik, Vågstranda, Øverås, Fiksdal, Tomrefjord, and Tresfjord.

The area is known for nature and outdoor pursuits, and has a long history in ship building and maritime crafts. The village of Vestnes (Helland) dates back to early medieval times, and has 24-hour ferry and water taxi service with the town of Molde to the northeast. The ferry takes about 35-minutes each way.

The 405-square-kilometre (156 sq mi) municipality is the 238th largest by area out of the 357 municipalities in Norway. Vestnes Municipality is the 144th most populous municipality in Norway with a population of 7,147. The municipality's population density is 17.7 inhabitants per square kilometre (46/sq mi) and its population has increased by 8% over the previous 10-year period.

== History ==
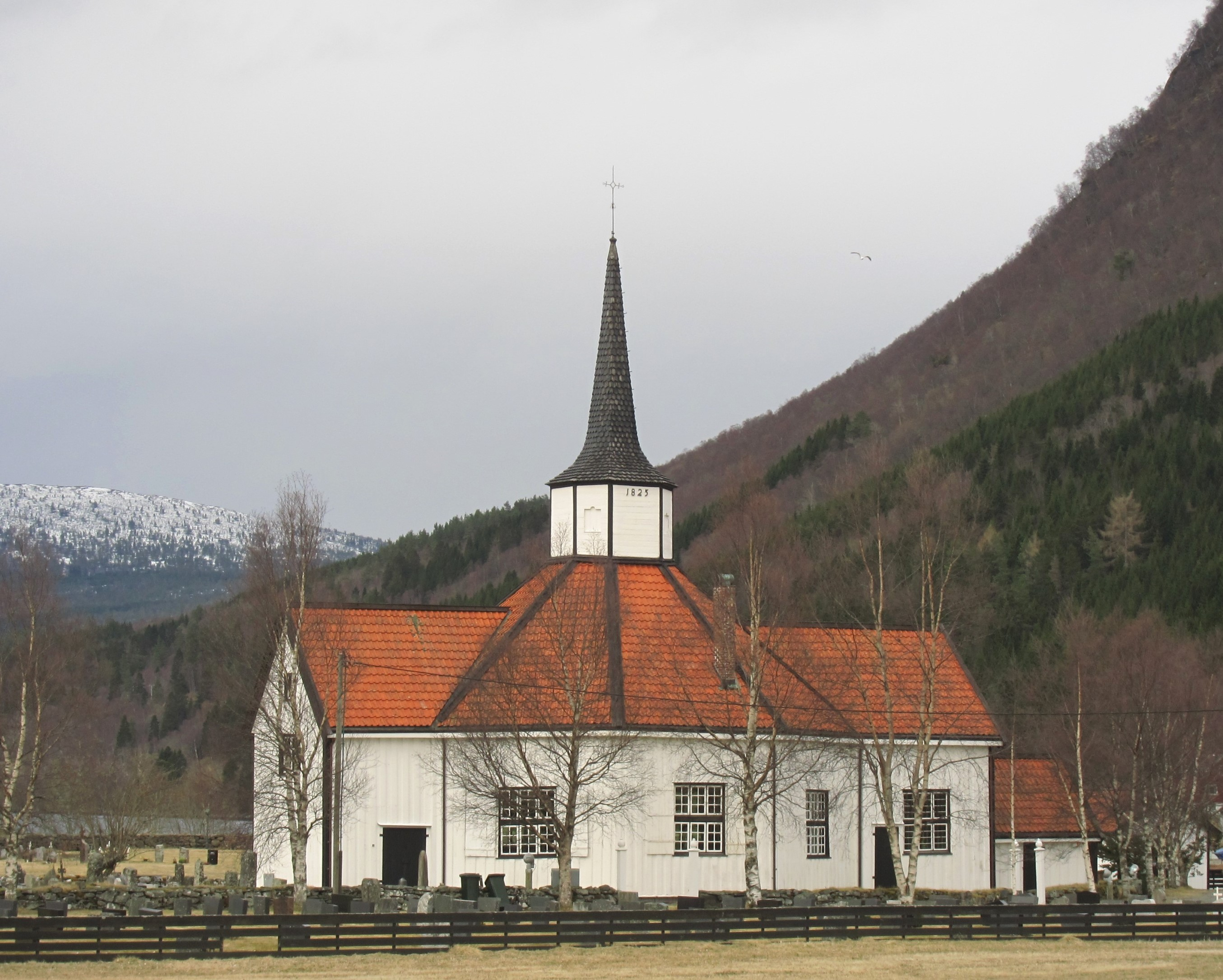
View of the Tresfjord Church

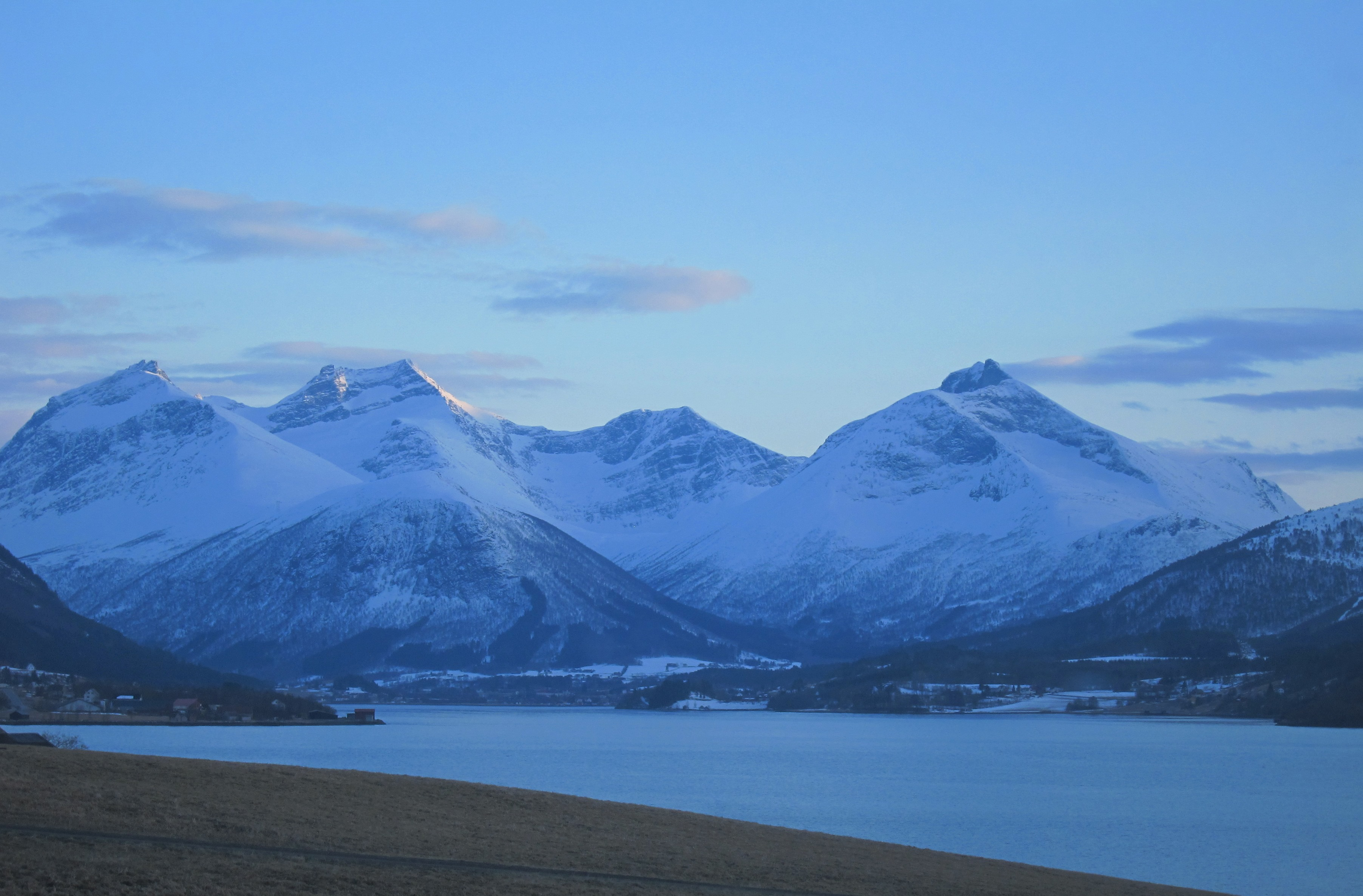
View of the Tresfjorden

The municipality of Vestnes was established in the fall of 1838 when the western district of the large Veøy Municipality was separated to form its own municipality (see formannskapsdistrikt law). On 1 January 1899, the southern district of the municipality (population: 1,408) was separated from Vestnes to form the new Sylte Municipality.

During the 1960s, there were many municipal mergers across Norway due to the work of the Schei Committee. On 1 January 1964, Vestnes Municipality (population: 3,895) and Tresfjord Municipality, formerly known as Sylte Municipality, (population: 1,319) were merged to form a new, larger Vestnes Municipality.

On 1 January 2021, the 53-square-kilometre (20 sq mi) Vågstranda area in the northwestern part of Rauma Municipality was transferred into Vestnes Municipality.

=== Name ===
The municipality (originally the parish) is named after the old Vestnes farm (Old Norse: Vestnes) since the first Vestnes Church was built there. The first element is vestr which means "west". The last element is nes which means "headland". Prior to 1889, the name was written Vestnæs.

=== Coat of arms ===
The coat of arms was granted on 11 April 1980. The official blazon is "Gules, two piles issuant from dexter Or" (Norwegian: I raudt to gull spissar mot venstre). This means the arms have a red field (background) and the charge is two piles (triangles) extending from the left to the right. The charge has a tincture of Or which means it is commonly colored yellow, but if it is made out of metal, then gold is used. The arms are designed to symbolize the geography of the municipality: a headland between two fjords—the Tresfjorden and the Tomrefjorden. The arms were designed by Jarle Skuseth. The municipal flag has the same design as the coat of arms.

=== Museums ===
A Viking barrow burial was uncovered at Villa Farm near Vestnes in 1894. Now in the British Museum's collection in London, the rich grave finds include a pair of oval brooches and other dress accessories, a comb, remnants of a bucket and a box, a bridle-bit, agricultural tools, a bronze bowl, a whalebone plaque, a weaving batten and a whetstone.

The Møre og Romsdal Agricultural Museum (Landbruksmuseet for Møre og Romsdal) was established in the municipality at the Gjermundnes Farm in 1979.

=== Churches ===
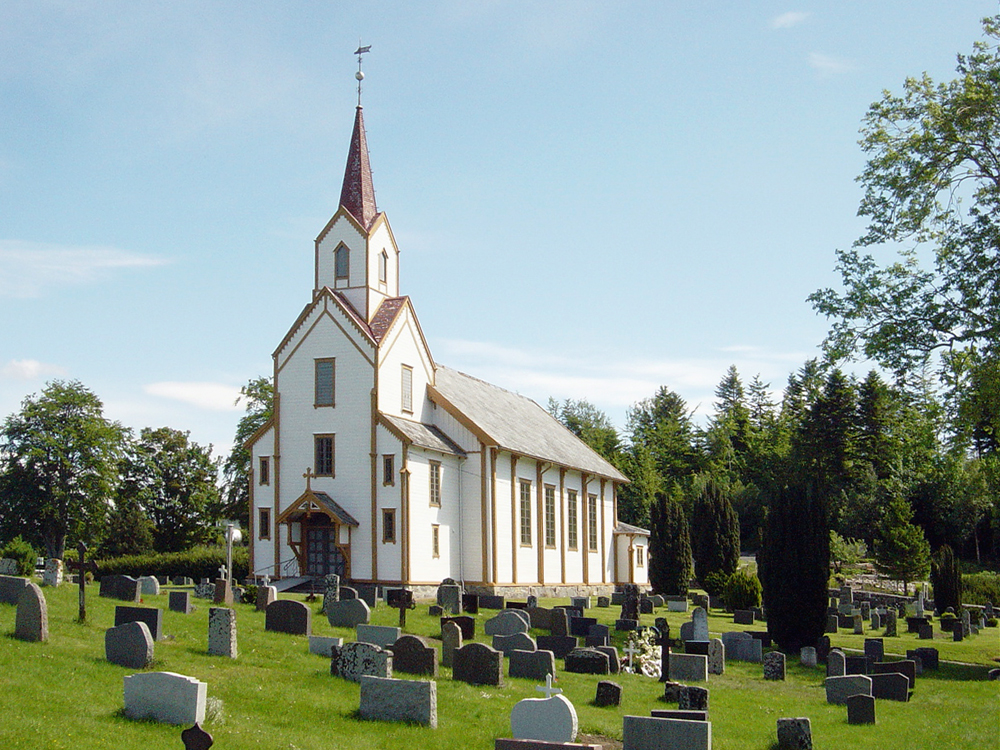
Vestnes Church

The Church of Norway has five parishes (sokn) within Vestnes Municipality. It is part of the Indre Romsdal prosti (deanery) in the Diocese of Møre.

Churches in Vestnes Municipality
Parish (sokn)	Church name	Location of the church	Year built
Vestnes	Vestnes Church	Vestnes	1872
Fiksdal	Fiksdal Church	Fiksdalen	1866
Tresfjord	Tresfjord Church	Tresfjord	1828
Vike	Vike Church	Vikebukt	1970
Vågstranda	Vågstranda Church	Vågstranda	1870

== Geography ==
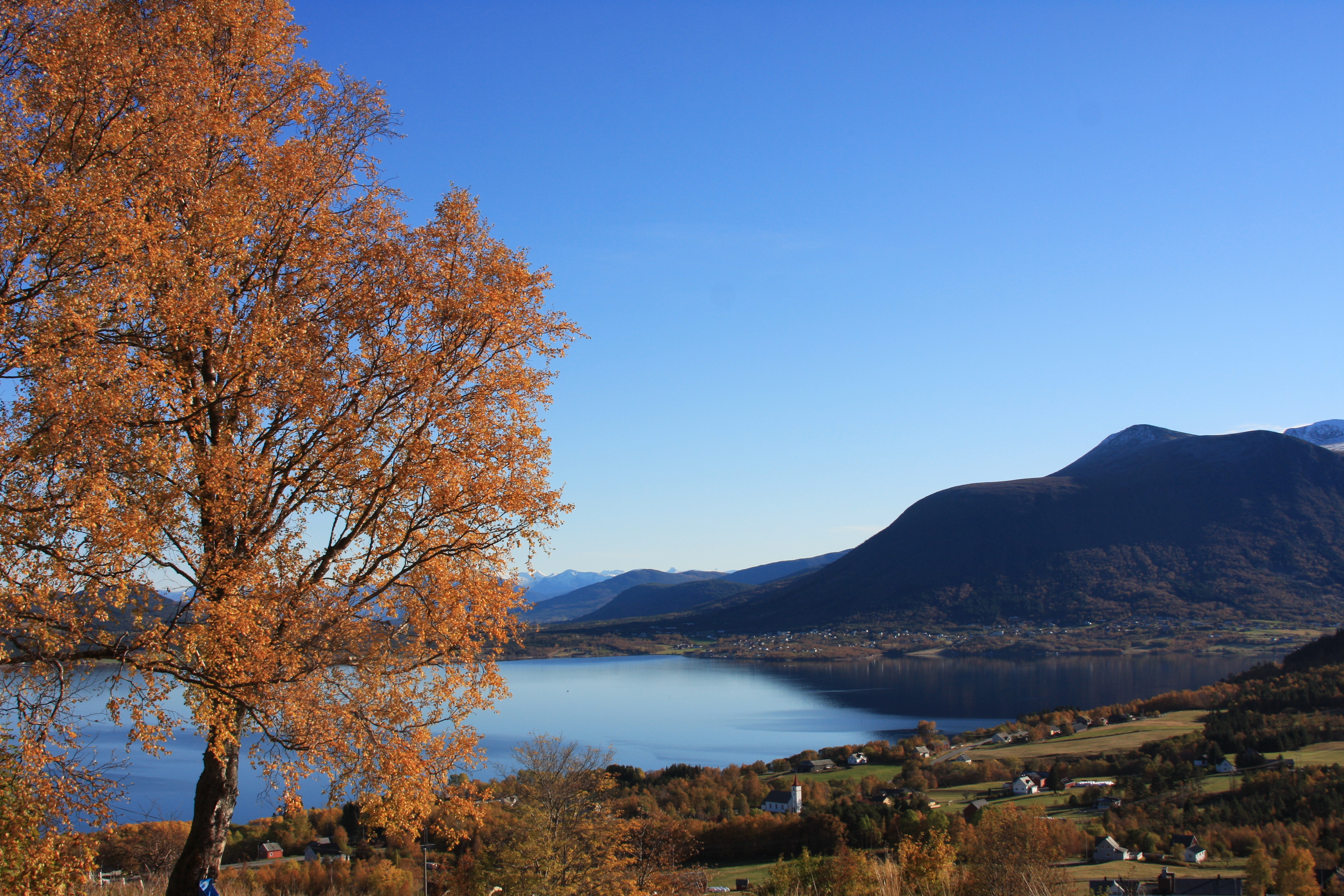
view of Fiksdal village

Vestnes is located in an area of great natural splendour on the southern shores of the vast Romsdal Fjord. The Tresfjorden and Tomrefjorden branch off Romsdal Fjord to the south. Vestnes borders Rauma Municipality to the east, as well as Fjord Municipality and Ålesund Municipality to the south. Across the Moldefjorden to the north is Molde Municipality. The highest point in the municipality is the 1,467.83-metre (4,815.7 ft) tall mountain Sandfjellet, a tripoint on the border of Vestnes Municipality, Fjord Municipality, and Rauma Municipality.

== Government ==
Vestnes Municipality is responsible for primary education (through 10th grade), outpatient health services, senior citizen services, welfare and other social services, zoning, economic development, and municipal roads and utilities. The municipality is governed by a municipal council of directly elected representatives. The mayor is indirectly elected by a vote of the municipal council. The municipality is under the jurisdiction of the Nordmøre og Romsdal District Court and the Frostating Court of Appeal.

=== Municipal council ===
The municipal council (Kommunestyre) of Vestnes Municipality is made up of 23 representatives that are elected to four year terms. The tables below show the current and historical composition of the council by political party.

Vestnes kommunestyre 2023–2027
Party name (in Nynorsk)	Number of representatives
Labour Party (Arbeidarpartiet)	4
Progress Party (Framstegspartiet)	6
Conservative Party (Høgre)	4
Industry and Business Party (Industri‑ og Næringspartiet)	1
Christian Democratic Party (Kristeleg Folkeparti)	1
Centre Party (Senterpartiet)	4
Socialist Left Party (Sosialistisk Venstreparti)	2
Liberal Party (Venstre)	1
Total number of members:	23

Vestnes kommunestyre 2019–2023
Party name (in Nynorsk)	Number of representatives
Labour Party (Arbeidarpartiet)	3
Progress Party (Framstegspartiet)	4
Conservative Party (Høgre)	3
Christian Democratic Party (Kristeleg Folkeparti)	1
Pensioners' Party (Pensjonistpartiet)	2
Centre Party (Senterpartiet)	7
Socialist Left Party (Sosialistisk Venstreparti)	2
Liberal Party (Venstre)	1
Total number of members:	23

Vestnes kommunestyre 2015–2019
Party name (in Nynorsk)	Number of representatives
Labour Party (Arbeidarpartiet)	3
Progress Party (Framstegspartiet)	2
Conservative Party (Høgre)	3
Christian Democratic Party (Kristeleg Folkeparti)	1
Pensioners' Party (Pensjonistpartiet)	1
Centre Party (Senterpartiet)	10
Socialist Left Party (Sosialistisk Venstreparti)	1
Liberal Party (Venstre)	2
Total number of members:	23

Vestnes kommunestyre 2011–2015
Party name (in Nynorsk)	Number of representatives
Labour Party (Arbeidarpartiet)	4
Progress Party (Framstegspartiet)	4
Conservative Party (Høgre)	5
Christian Democratic Party (Kristeleg Folkeparti)	2
Centre Party (Senterpartiet)	4
Liberal Party (Venstre)	4
Total number of members:	23

Vestnes kommunestyre 2007–2011
Party name (in Nynorsk)	Number of representatives
Labour Party (Arbeidarpartiet)	6
Progress Party (Framstegspartiet)	8
Conservative Party (Høgre)	4
Christian Democratic Party (Kristeleg Folkeparti)	2
Centre Party (Senterpartiet)	5
Socialist Left Party (Sosialistisk Venstreparti)	1
Liberal Party (Venstre)	1
Total number of members:	27

Vestnes kommunestyre 2003–2007
Party name (in Nynorsk)	Number of representatives
Labour Party (Arbeidarpartiet)	6
Progress Party (Framstegspartiet)	7
Conservative Party (Høgre)	4
Christian Democratic Party (Kristeleg Folkeparti)	3
Centre Party (Senterpartiet)	3
Socialist Left Party (Sosialistisk Venstreparti)	1
Liberal Party (Venstre)	1
Cross-party list (Tverrpolitisk liste)	2
Total number of members:	27

Vestnes kommunestyre 1999–2003
Party name (in Nynorsk)	Number of representatives
Labour Party (Arbeidarpartiet)	9
Progress Party (Framstegspartiet)	2
Conservative Party (Høgre)	8
Christian Democratic Party (Kristeleg Folkeparti)	5
Centre Party (Senterpartiet)	6
Socialist Left Party (Sosialistisk Venstreparti)	1
Liberal Party (Venstre)	2
Total number of members:	33

Vestnes kommunestyre 1995–1999
Party name (in Nynorsk)	Number of representatives
Labour Party (Arbeidarpartiet)	5
Progress Party (Framstegspartiet)	1
Conservative Party (Høgre)	3
Christian Democratic Party (Kristeleg Folkeparti)	4
Centre Party (Senterpartiet)	8
Liberal Party (Venstre)	3
Independent election list for Tomrefjord and Øverås/Nerås (Partipolitisk uavhengig valliste for Tomrefjord og Overås/Nerås)	6
Independent election list for the Helland school area (Partipolitisk uavhengig valliste for Helland skulekrins)	3
Total number of members:	33

Vestnes kommunestyre 1991–1995
Party name (in Nynorsk)	Number of representatives
Labour Party (Arbeidarpartiet)	6
Progress Party (Framstegspartiet)	3
Conservative Party (Høgre)	4
Christian Democratic Party (Kristeleg Folkeparti)	4
Centre Party (Senterpartiet)	8
Socialist Left Party (Sosialistisk Venstreparti)	2
Liberal Party (Venstre)	2
Independent election list for Tomrefjord and Øverås/Nerås (Partipolitisk uavhengig valliste for Tomrefjord og Overås/Nerås)	6
Total number of members:	33

Vestnes kommunestyre 1987–1991
Party name (in Nynorsk)	Number of representatives
Labour Party (Arbeidarpartiet)	9
Conservative Party (Høgre)	6
Christian Democratic Party (Kristeleg Folkeparti)	5
Centre Party (Senterpartiet)	5
Socialist Left Party (Sosialistisk Venstreparti)	1
Liberal Party (Venstre)	2
Independent party list for Tomrefjord (Partipolitisk uavhengig liste for Tomrefjord)	5
Total number of members:	33

Vestnes kommunestyre 1983–1987
Party name (in Nynorsk)	Number of representatives
Labour Party (Arbeidarpartiet)	8
Progress Party (Framstegspartiet)	2
Conservative Party (Høgre)	4
Christian Democratic Party (Kristeleg Folkeparti)	6
Centre Party (Senterpartiet)	6
Socialist Left Party (Sosialistisk Venstreparti)	1
Liberal Party (Venstre)	2
Independent party list for Tomrefjord (Partipolitisk uavhengig liste for Tomrefjord)	4
Total number of members:	33

Vestnes kommunestyre 1979–1983
Party name (in Nynorsk)	Number of representatives
Labour Party (Arbeidarpartiet)	7
Conservative Party (Høgre)	5
Christian Democratic Party (Kristeleg Folkeparti)	6
Centre Party (Senterpartiet)	7
Socialist Left Party (Sosialistisk Venstreparti)	1
Liberal Party (Venstre)	3
Independent party list for Tomrefjord (Partipolitisk uavhengig liste for Tomrefjord)	4
Total number of members:	33

Vestnes kommunestyre 1975–1979
Party name (in Nynorsk)	Number of representatives
Labour Party (Arbeidarpartiet)	7
Conservative Party (Høgre)	2
Christian Democratic Party (Kristeleg Folkeparti)	7
Centre Party (Senterpartiet)	6
Liberal Party (Venstre)	5
Area list for Tomrefjord and Overås (Krinsliste for Tomrefjord og Overås)	6
Total number of members:	33

Vestnes kommunestyre 1971–1975
Party name (in Nynorsk)	Number of representatives
Labour Party (Arbeidarpartiet)	9
Conservative Party (Høgre)	1
Christian Democratic Party (Kristeleg Folkeparti)	6
Centre Party (Senterpartiet)	7
Liberal Party (Venstre)	4
Local List(s) (Lokale lister)	6
Total number of members:	33

Vestnes kommunestyre 1967–1971
Party name (in Nynorsk)	Number of representatives
Labour Party (Arbeidarpartiet)	9
Conservative Party (Høgre)	1
Christian Democratic Party (Kristeleg Folkeparti)	6
Centre Party (Senterpartiet)	7
Liberal Party (Venstre)	4
Local List(s) (Lokale lister)	6
Total number of members:	33

Vestnes kommunestyre 1963–1967
Party name (in Nynorsk)	Number of representatives
Labour Party (Arbeidarpartiet)	12
Conservative Party (Høgre)	1
Christian Democratic Party (Kristeleg Folkeparti)	7
Centre Party (Senterpartiet)	7
Liberal Party (Venstre)	4
Local List(s) (Lokale lister)	2
Total number of members:	33
Note: On 1 January 1964, Tresfjord Municipality became part of Vestnes Municipality.

Vestnes heradsstyre 1959–1963
Party name (in Nynorsk)	Number of representatives
Labour Party (Arbeidarpartiet)	8
Christian Democratic Party (Kristeleg Folkeparti)	6
Local List(s) (Lokale lister)	11
Total number of members:	25

Vestnes heradsstyre 1955–1959
Party name (in Nynorsk)	Number of representatives
Labour Party (Arbeidarpartiet)	6
Christian Democratic Party (Kristeleg Folkeparti)	5
Joint List(s) of Non-Socialist Parties (Borgarlege Felleslister)	2
Local List(s) (Lokale lister)	12
Total number of members:	25

Vestnes heradsstyre 1951–1955
Party name (in Nynorsk)	Number of representatives
Labour Party (Arbeidarpartiet)	7
Christian Democratic Party (Kristeleg Folkeparti)	4
Joint List(s) of Non-Socialist Parties (Borgarlege Felleslister)	1
Local List(s) (Lokale lister)	12
Total number of members:	24

Vestnes heradsstyre 1947–1951
Party name (in Nynorsk)	Number of representatives
Labour Party (Arbeidarpartiet)	9
Christian Democratic Party (Kristeleg Folkeparti)	2
Local List(s) (Lokale lister)	13
Total number of members:	24

Vestnes heradsstyre 1945–1947
Party name (in Nynorsk)	Number of representatives
Labour Party (Arbeidarpartiet)	7
List of workers, fishermen, and small farmholders (Arbeidarar, fiskarar, småbrukarar liste)	3
Joint List(s) of Non-Socialist Parties (Borgarlege Felleslister)	8
Local List(s) (Lokale lister)	6
Total number of members:	24

Vestnes heradsstyre 1937–1941*
Party name (in Nynorsk)	Number of representatives
Labour Party (Arbeidarpartiet)	9
Joint List(s) of Non-Socialist Parties (Borgarlege Felleslister)	3
Local List(s) (Lokale lister)	12
Total number of members:	24
Note: Due to the German occupation of Norway during World War II, no elections were held for new municipal councils until after the war ended in 1945.

=== Mayors ===
The mayor (Nynorsk: ordførar) of Vestnes Municipality is the political leader of the municipality and the chairperson of the municipal council. Here is a list of people who have held this position:

- 1838–1841: Henrik Jonsen Remmem
- 1842–1843: Arit Bjermeland
- 1844–1845: Nils N. Vestnæs
- 1846–1847: Christen N. Stokkeland
- 1847–1859: Erik Aslaksen Sylte
- 1860–1861: Hans Nakken
- 1862–1869: Ivar Brovold
- 1870–1873: Walter Scott Dahl (V)
- 1874–1875: Christofer Domaas
- 1876–1883: Walter Scott Dahl (V)
- 1884–1886: Ivar Brovold
- 1886–1889: Peder A. Gjelsten
- 1889–1891: Mads Ellingsæter
- 1891–1895: Peder A. Gjelsten
- 1896–1898: Martinus P. Sylte
- 1899–1901: Mads Ellingsæter
- 1902–1910: Rasmuss Stokkeland
- 1911–1916: P.L. Legernes
- 1917–1919: Nils K. Bårdsnes
- 1920–1922: Anton J. Nerem
- 1923–1925: Nils K. Bårdsnes
- 1926–1928: Olav Eidhammer
- 1929–1931: Peder P. Gjelsten
- 1932–1934: Olav Eidhammer
- 1935–1937: Einar Helland
- 1938–1941: Kristian K Frostad (V)
- 1941–1945: Olav Rekdal (NS)
- 1945–1951: Kristian K Frostad (V)
- 1951–1956: Einar Aas
- 1956–1957: Olav Tomren
- 1957–1963: Kåre Rekdal (KrF)
- 1964–1971: Peder B. Hjelvik (Sp)
- 1972–1980: Torgeir Stene (V)
- 1980–1980: Ole S. Øveraas (Sp)
- 1981–1985: Georg Balstad (KrF)
- 1986–1987: Alf Johan Hustad
- 1987–1999: Petter Inge Bergheim (Sp)
- 1999–2003: Roald Fiksdal (Ap)
- 2003–2007: Knut Magne Flølo (FrP)
- 2007–2015: Øyvind Uren (Ap)
- 2015–2021: Geir Inge Lien (Sp)
- 2021–present: Randi Bergundhaugen (H)

== Economy ==
Vestnes is a relatively good agricultural community with emphasis on livestock and milk production. Vestnes, however, is primarily a manufacturing district. The main industry is the ship-building industry with a number of different companies located in Vestnes. A total of 63% of industry employment (2004) in Vestnes is part of the ship-building industry. Other that shipbuilding, there are several companies in the food, textile and clothing, wood products, furniture, and metal products industries in Vestnes.

== Media ==
The newspaper Vestnesavisa is published in Vestnes.

== Transportation ==
The European route E39 highway goes through Vestnes on its way from Sjøholt to Molde. The European route E136 highway goes through Vestnes on its way from Ålesund to Dombås. The two highways intersect and share part of the route through Vestnes. The new Tresfjord Bridge carries the E136 highway over the Tresfjorden rather than the previous roadway that follows the shoreline all the way around the fjord.

== Notable people ==
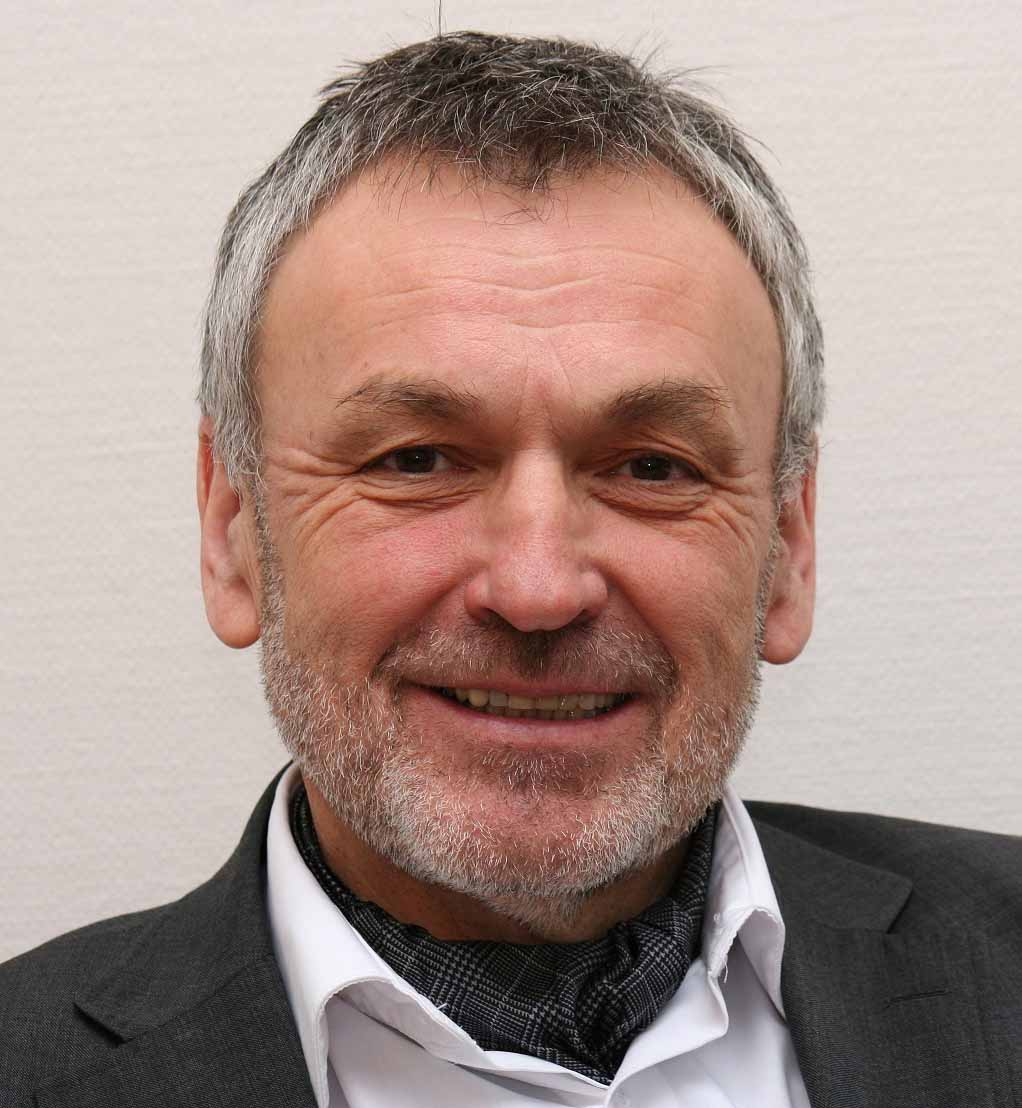
Lodve Solholm, 2011

- Peter L. Rypdal (1909 in Tresfjord – 1988), a fiddler and traditional folk music composer
- Jakob Rypdal (1926 in Tresfjord – 2015), a triple jumper
- Terje Rypdal (born 1947), a guitarist and composer who lives in Tresfjord
- Lodve Solholm (born 1949 in Vestnes), the county governor of Møre og Romsdal from 2009 to 2018
- Barry Gjerde (born 1951 in Vestnes), a Canadian-Japanese voice actor who works in Japan
- Bjørn Rune Gjelsten (born 1956 in Tomrefjord), a powerboat racer and joint owner of Wimbledon F.C.
- Kjetil Rekdal (born 1968 in Vestnes), a football manager and a former footballer with 484 club caps and 83 for Norway
- Bernt Hulsker (born 1977), a retired footballer with over 250 club caps who grew up in Vestnes
