= Vike Church =

Church in Møre og Romsdal, Norway

- Vike kyrkje
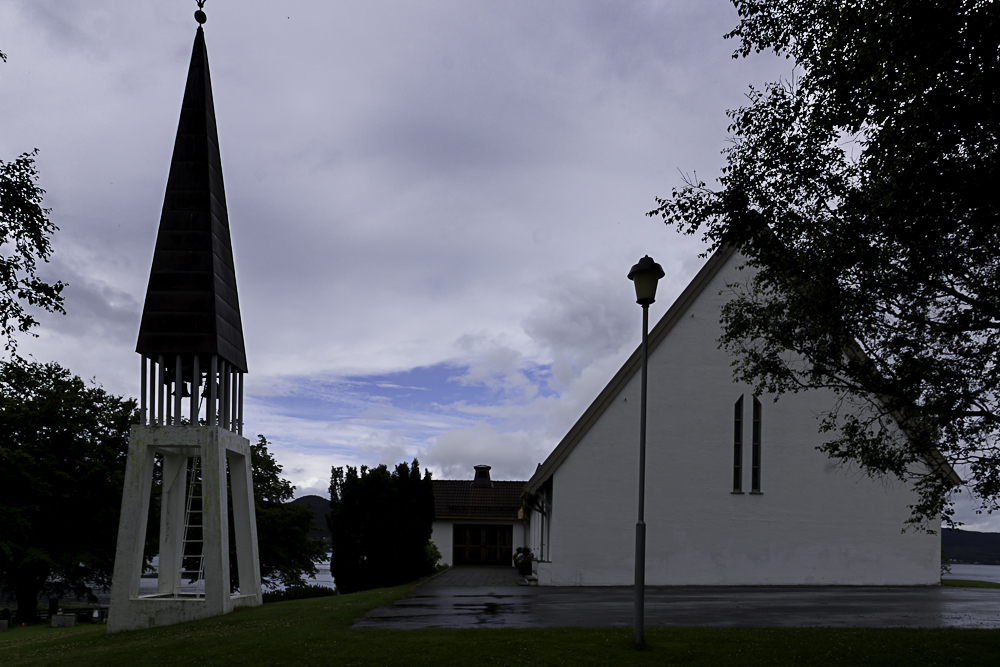
- View of the church
- Vike Church
- 62°36′47″N 7°08′35″E
- Location: Vestnes Municipality, Møre og Romsdal
- Country: Norway
- Denomination: Church of Norway
- Churchmanship: Evangelical Lutheran

History
- Former name: Vike kapell
- Status: Parish church
- Founded: 1970
- Consecrated: 1970

Architecture
- Functional status: Active
- Architect: Olav Solheim
- Architectural type: Long church
- Completed: 1970 (56 years ago)

Specifications
- Capacity: 200
- Materials: Concrete

Administration
- Diocese: Møre bispedømme
- Deanery: Indre Romsdal prosti
- Parish: Vike
- Norwegian Cultural Heritage Site
- Type: Church
- Status: Not protected
- ID: 85838

Vike Church (Norwegian: Vike kyrkje) is a parish church of the Church of Norway in Vestnes Municipality in Møre og Romsdal county, Norway. It is located in the village of Vikebukt. It is the church for the Vike parish which is part of the Indre Romsdal prosti (deanery) in the Diocese of Møre. The white, brick church was built in a long church style in 1970 using plans drawn up by the architect Olav Solheim. The church seats about 200 people.

== See also ==
- List of churches in Møre
