= Vikebukt =

Village in Vestnes Municipality, Norway

- Village
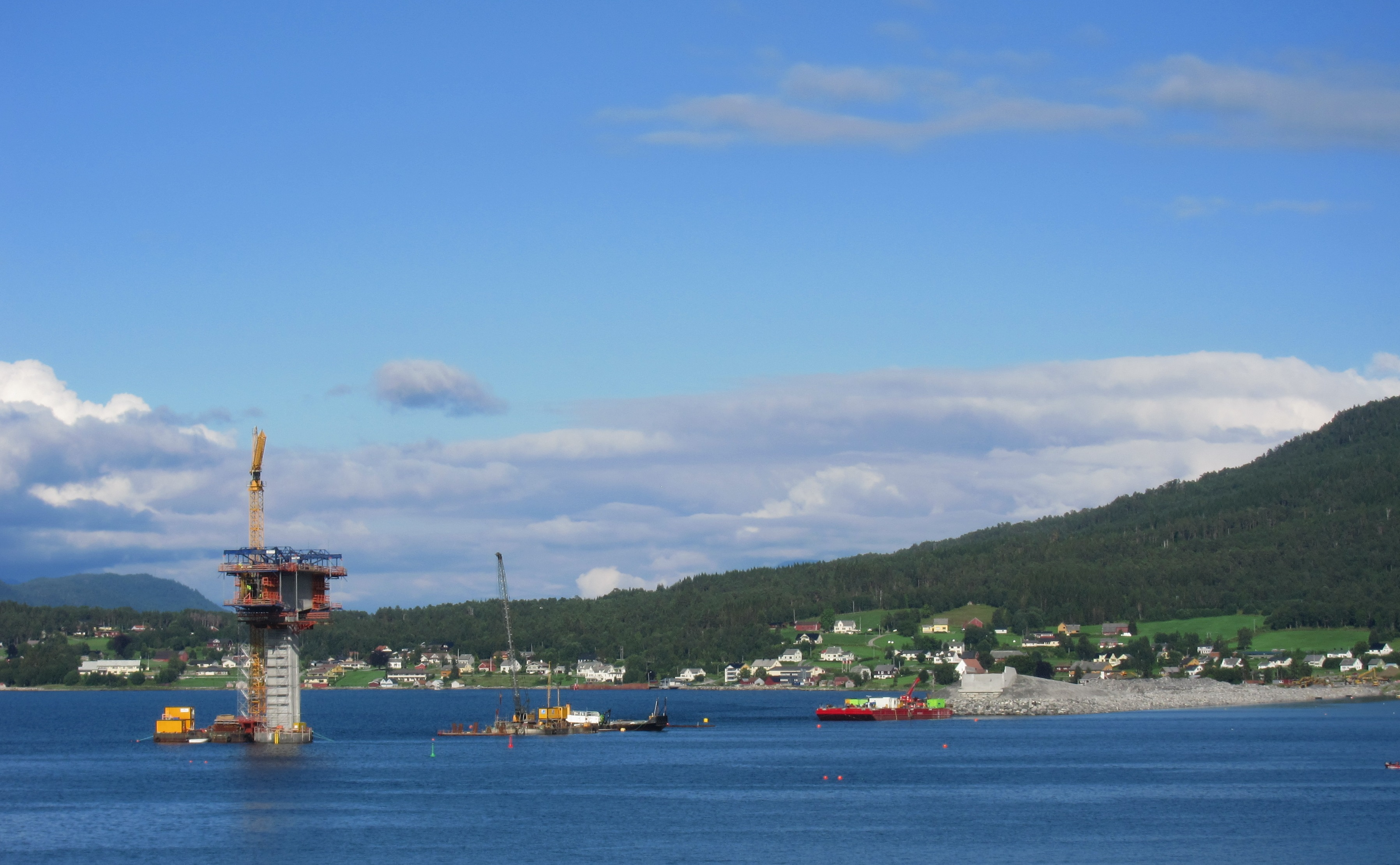
- View of the village in 2014 when the Tresfjord Bridge was under construction
- Interactive map of Vikebukt
- Location within Møre og Romsdal Location within Norway
- Coordinates: 62.6161°N 7.1488°E
- Country: Norway
- Region: Western Norway
- County: Møre og Romsdal
- District: Romsdal
- Municipality: Vestnes Municipality

Area
  - Total: 0.53 km^{2} (0.20 sq mi)
- Elevation: 7 m (23 ft)

Population (2024)
  - Total: 280
  - Density: 528/km^{2} (1,370/sq mi)
- Time zone: UTC+01:00 (CET)
  - Summer (DST): UTC+02:00 (CEST)
- Post Code: 6392 Vikebukt

Vikebukt is a village in Vestnes Municipality in Møre og Romsdal county, Norway. Along the eastern side of the mouth of the Tresfjorden, it is located just south of where the fjord meets the Romsdalsfjorden.

The 0.53-square-kilometre (130-acre) village has a population (2024) of 280 and a population density of 528 inhabitants per square kilometre (1,370/sq mi).

In 2015, the Tresfjord Bridge opened, crossing the fjord from Vestnes village to Vikebukt. The bridge carries the European route E136 highway over the fjord and through Vikebukt. Vike Church is located in the village and Gjermundnes Farm lies just north of the village.
