= Vestnes (village) =

Village in Vestnes Municipality, Norway

Vestnes Helland
- Village
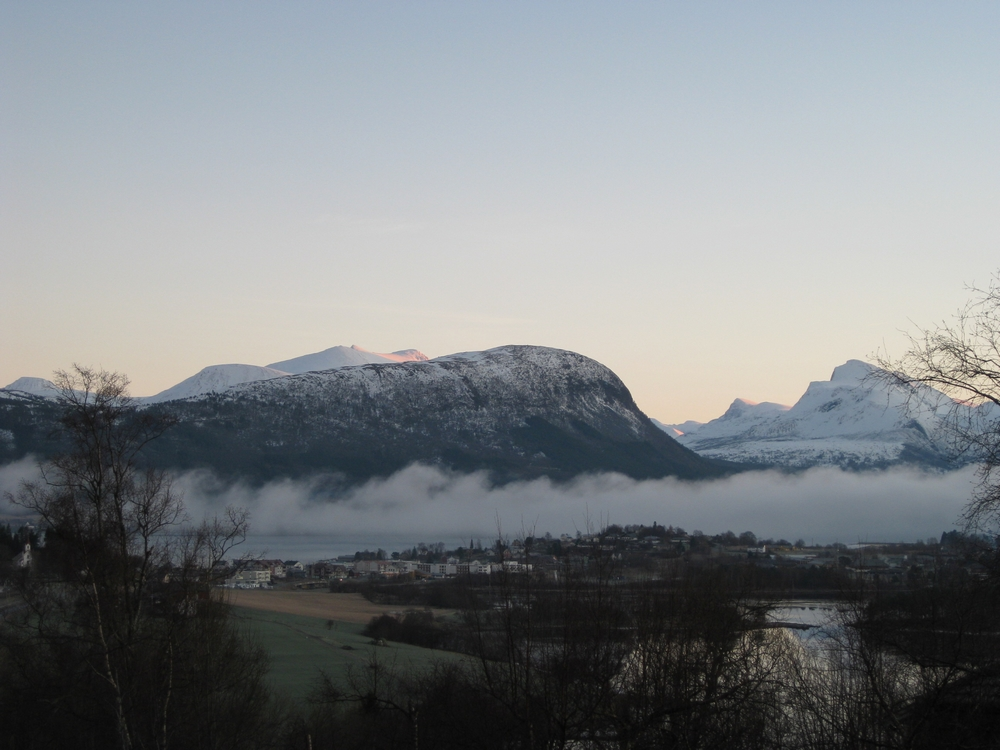
- View of the village looking east across the Tresfjorden
- Interactive map of Vestnes
- Location within Møre og Romsdal Location within Norway
- Coordinates: 62.6254°N 7.0870°E
- Country: Norway
- Region: Western Norway
- County: Møre og Romsdal
- District: Romsdal
- Municipality: Vestnes Municipality

Area
  - Total: 2.08 km^{2} (0.80 sq mi)
- Elevation: 9 m (30 ft)

Population (2024)
  - Total: 2,618
  - Density: 1,259/km^{2} (3,260/sq mi)
- Time zone: UTC+01:00 (CET)
  - Summer (DST): UTC+02:00 (CEST)
- Post Code: 6390 Vestnes

Vestnes or Helland is the administrative centre of Vestnes Municipality in Møre og Romsdal county, Norway. The village is located on the western shore of the Tresfjorden, near where the fjord empties into the main Romsdalsfjord. The village lies along the European route E39 highway.

The 2.08-square-kilometre (510-acre) village has a population (2024) of 2,618 and a population density of 1,259 inhabitants per square kilometre (3,260/sq mi).

The villages of Vik and Tomrefjord lie about 8 kilometres (5.0 mi) to the southwest, the village of Tresfjord lies about 12 kilometres (7.5 mi) to the south, and the village of Vikebukt lies directly across the Tresfjorden from Vestnes. The Tresfjord Bridge was completed in 2015, connecting Vikebukt to the southern part of Vestnes by bridge rather than an estimated 30-minute drive all the way around the fjord. The Tresfjord Bridge is part of European route E136. The prime minister, Erna Solberg was there at the opening as a stand-in for Minister of Transport Ketil Solvik-Olsen.

The village of Vestnes is actually located on two peninsulas separated by the Flatevågen bay. On the eastern end of the bay, the two peninsulas almost meet, forming a 70-metre (230 ft) wide channel connecting Flatevågen with the main Tresfjorden.

The village has a shopping center, some industries, municipal services, and Vestnes Church. Vestnesavisa is the local municipal newspaper, based in Vestnes.
