= Vestnes Church =

Church in Møre og Romsdal, Norway

- Vestnes kyrkje
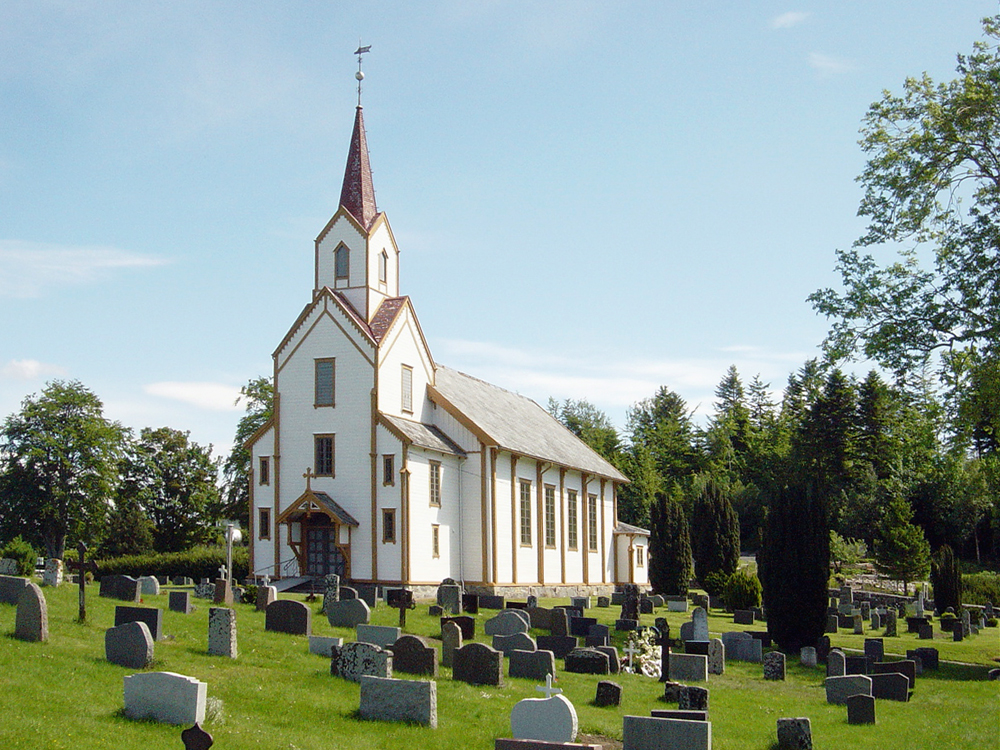
- View of the church
- Vestnes Church
- 62°37′39″N 7°05′06″E
- Location: Vestnes Municipality, Møre og Romsdal
- Country: Norway
- Denomination: Church of Norway
- Churchmanship: Evangelical Lutheran

History
- Status: Parish church
- Founded: c. 14th century
- Consecrated: 1872

Architecture
- Functional status: Active
- Architect(s): Jacob Wilhelm Nordan; Anders Johnsen Berg
- Architectural type: Long church
- Completed: 1872 (154 years ago)

Specifications
- Capacity: 480
- Materials: Wood

Administration
- Diocese: Møre bispedømme
- Deanery: Indre Romsdal prosti
- Parish: Vestnes
- Norwegian Cultural Heritage Site
- Type: Church
- Status: Listed
- ID: 85815

Vestnes Church (Norwegian: Vestnes kyrkje) is a parish church of the Church of Norway in Vestnes Municipality in Møre og Romsdal county, Norway. It is located in the village of Vestnes. It is the church for the Vestnes parish which is part of the Indre Romsdal prosti (deanery) in the Diocese of Møre. The white, wooden church was built in a long church design in 1872 by Anders Johnsen Berg who used plans drawn up by the architect Jacob Wilhelm Nordan. The church seats about 480 people.

== History ==
The earliest existing historical records of the church date back to 1589, when it was an annex to the Old Veøy Church. At that time, it was already an old stave church. The first church in Vestnes was a small wooden building that was possibly constructed in the 14th century on a site about 80 metres (260 ft) northwest of the present-day site of the church. During the 1640s, there were two additions built onto the church, both in a timber-frame construction: a transept to the north and to the south, creating a cruciform floor plan. In 1680, the old church was torn down and a new church was constructed just east of the cemetery which surrounded the old church building. The new church was completed in 1682. Some of the useful materials from the old church were reused in the new building. The new building was a cruciform design that was built with a timber-frame construction. Nearly 200 years later in 1872, a new church (the present church building) was built a short distance to the east of the previous church. When it was completed, the old church was torn down. The new church was built by the master carpenter Anders Johnsen Berg who used designs by the architect Jacob Wilhelm Nordan.

== Media gallery ==
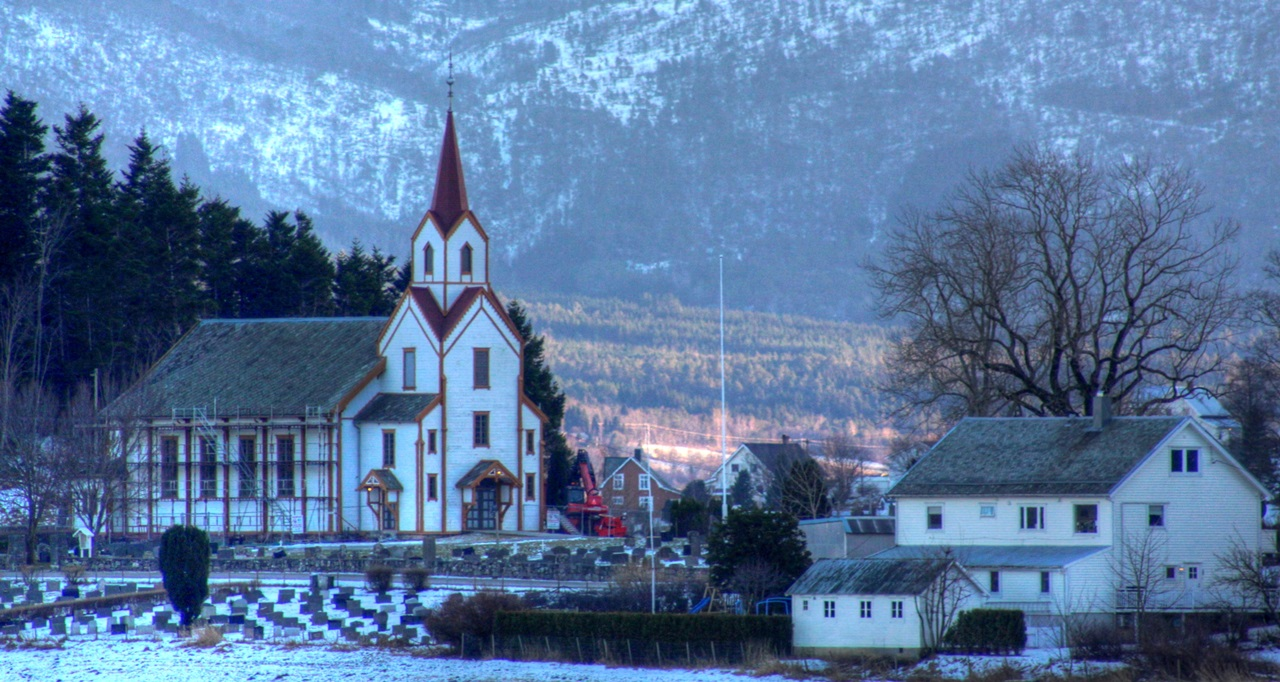

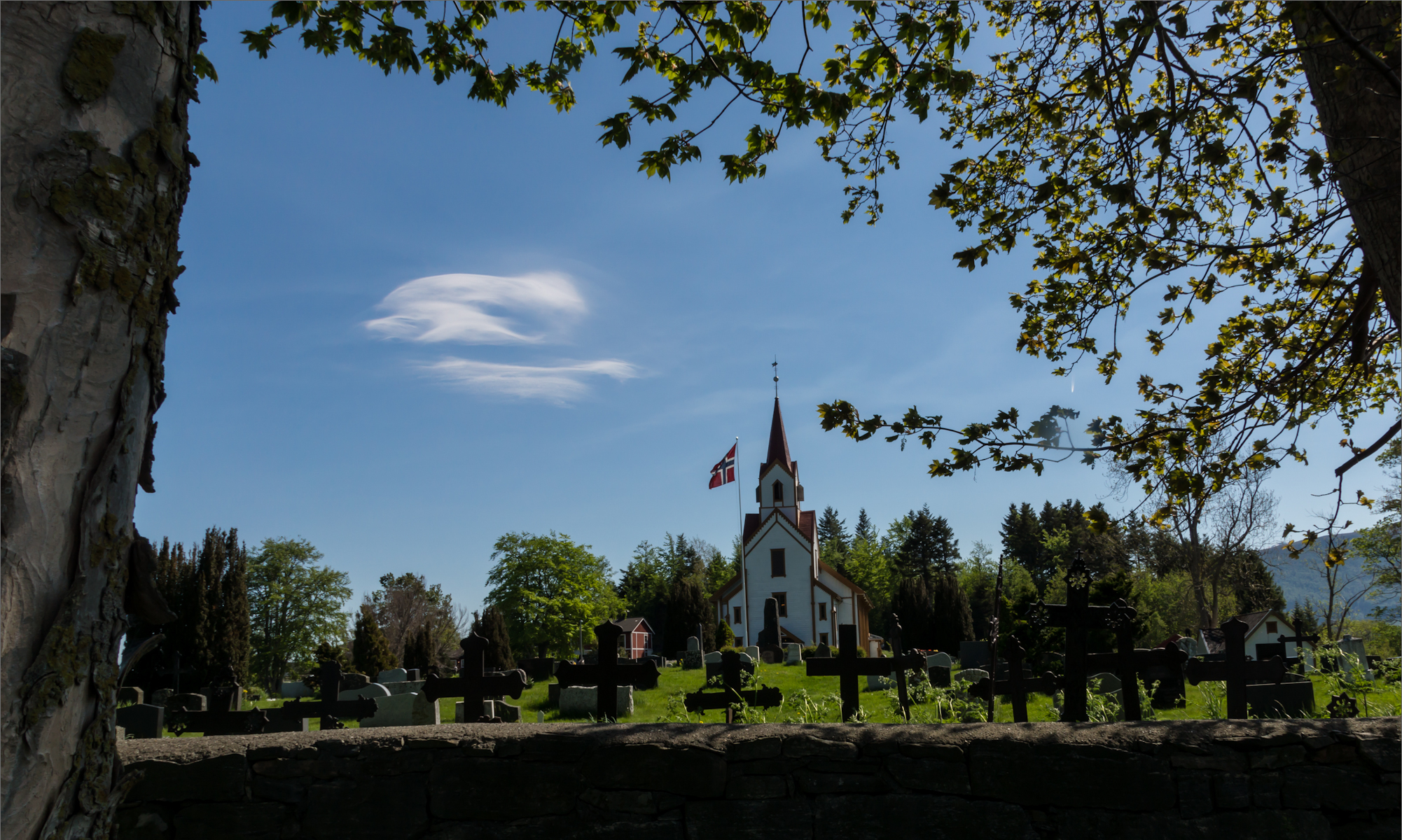

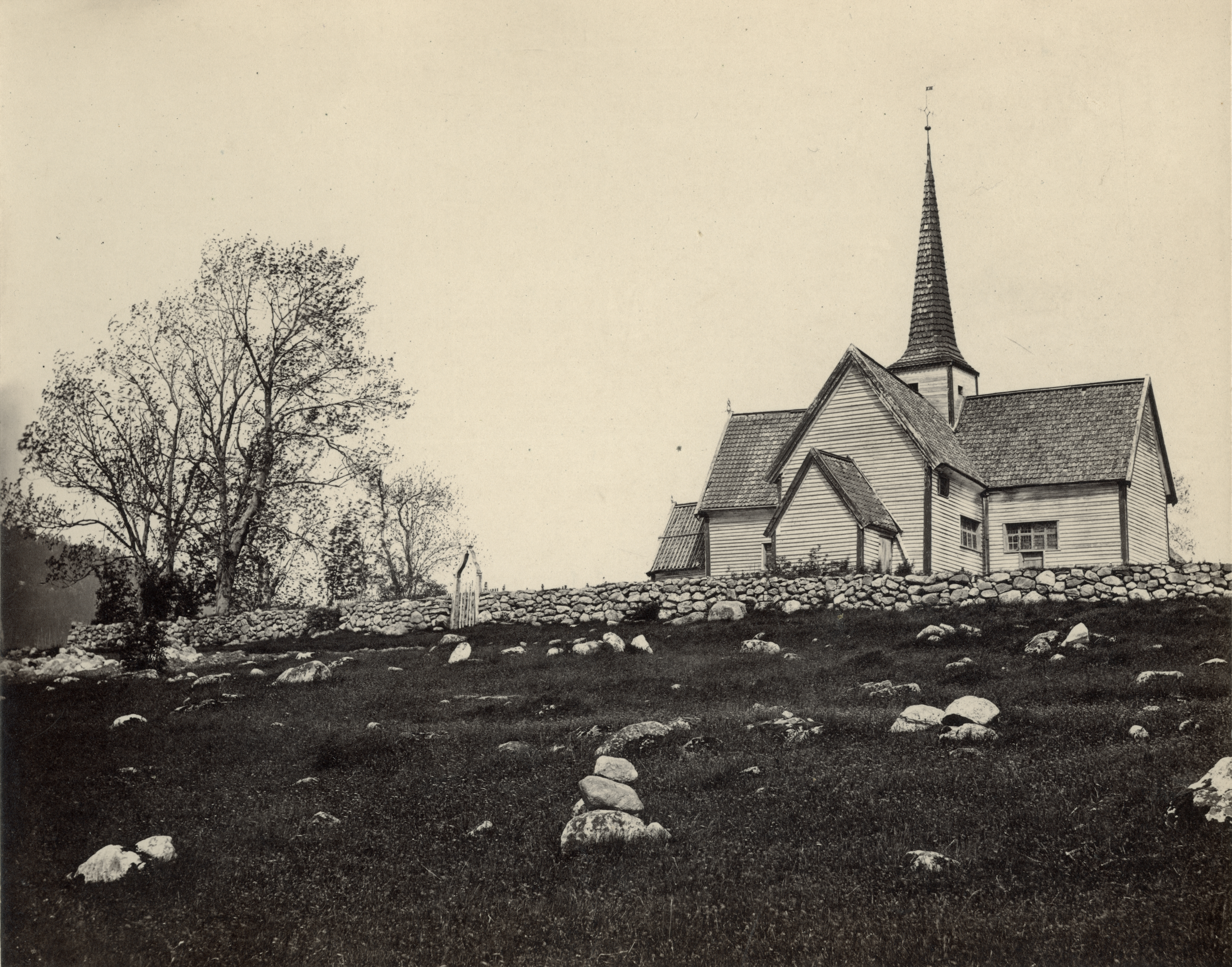
Old church (1682-1872)

== See also ==
- List of churches in Møre
