= Tresfjord Church =

Church in Møre og Romsdal, Norway

- Tresfjord kyrkje
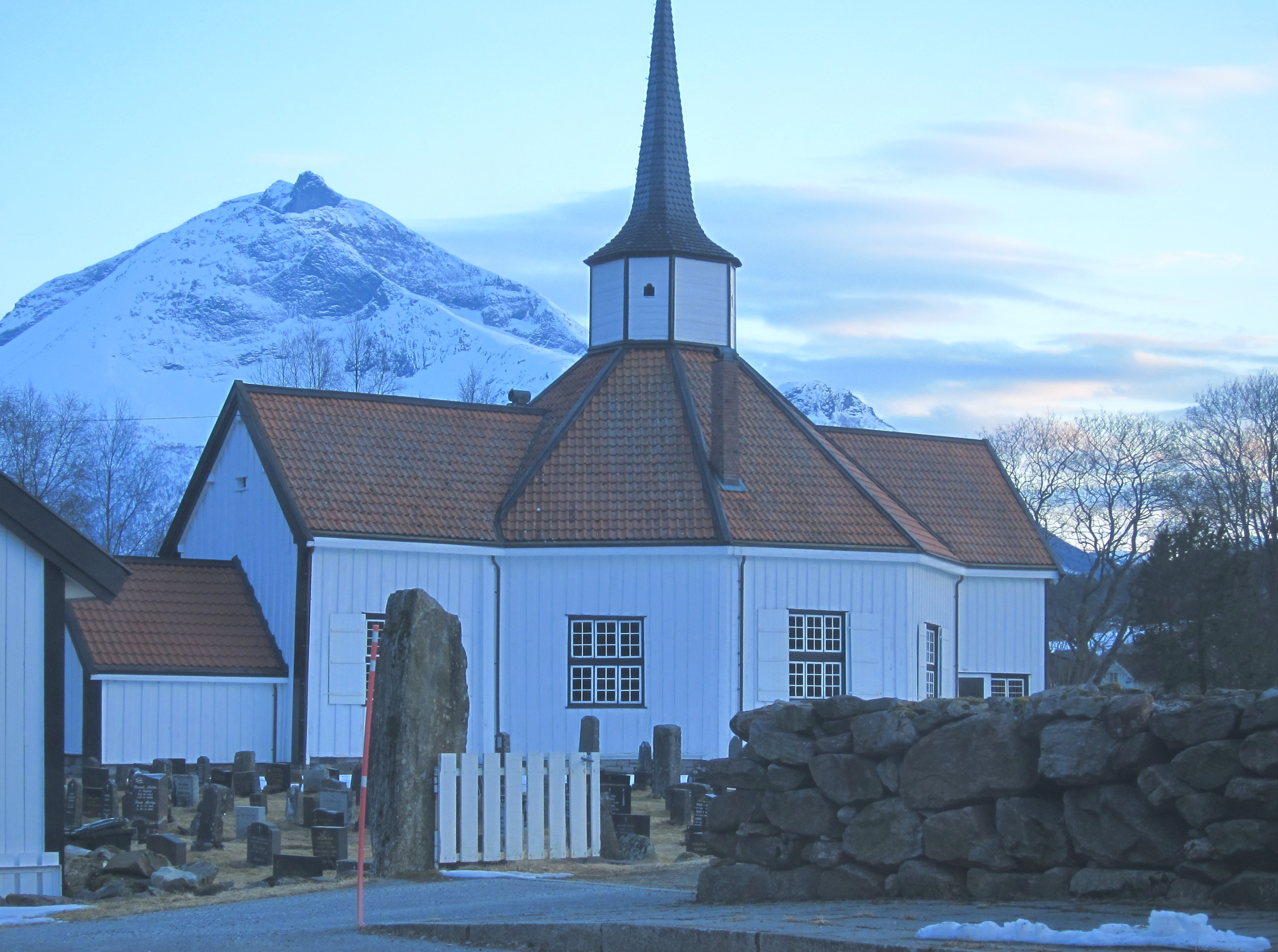
- View of the church
- Tresfjord Church
- 62°31′19″N 7°08′17″E
- Location: Vestnes Municipality, Møre og Romsdal
- Country: Norway
- Denomination: Church of Norway
- Churchmanship: Evangelical Lutheran

History
- Status: Parish church
- Founded: 14th century
- Consecrated: 17 June 1828

Architecture
- Functional status: Active
- Architect: Erik Kroken
- Architectural type: Octagonal
- Completed: 1828 (198 years ago)

Specifications
- Capacity: 220
- Materials: Wood

Administration
- Diocese: Møre bispedømme
- Deanery: Indre Romsdal prosti
- Parish: Tresfjord
- Norwegian Cultural Heritage Site
- Type: Church
- Status: Automatically protected
- ID: 85665

Tresfjord Church (Norwegian: Tresfjord kyrkje) is a parish church of the Church of Norway in Vestnes Municipality in Møre og Romsdal county, Norway. It is located in the village of Tresfjord. It is the church for the Tresfjord parish, which is part of the Indre Romsdal prosti (deanery) in the Diocese of Møre. The white, wooden church was built in an octagonal style in 1828 using plans drawn up by the architect and master builder Erik Kroken. The church seats about 220 people.

The King and Queen of Norway visited the church in 2003.

== History ==
The earliest existing historical records of the church date back to 1589 when it was called Sulta kirkje, but the church was not new that year. At that time, it was mentioned in Trondhjems reformats 1589, (a record of churches and ecclesiastical goods in central and northern Norway), and it was considered to be an annex chapel to the Old Veøy Church. The first church here was a wooden stave church that may have been built in the 14th century. The medieval building was located about 40 metres (130 ft) west of the current church site.

In 1690, the old church was torn down. The materials from the old church were sold. Window glass from the previous church dating, to 1634, that was used in the sacristy of the church, was reused in a residential building but is now kept at the museum in Trondheim. That same year, a new wooden cruciform church was constructed on the same site as the previous building. The tower was relatively tall and centrally located. The walls of this 1690 church were covered in siding. The pulpit and some other furniture from the previous church were reused in the new church in 1690. During the Norwegian church auction, the church and adjacent properties were sold by the King in 1721 to help pay off debts from the Great Northern War. The church was bought by 84 local farmers from the Tresfjord area.

In 1825, the church was 135 years old and in poor shape, so the people decided to tear it down and rebuild a new church on a site about 40 metres (130 ft) east of the old site. Erik Kroken was hired as the lead builder. Farmers who supplied timber for the new building were able to obtain part ownership in the church. Substantial construction work was volunteer and unpaid. The new church was completed in 1828. The building was consecrated on 17 June 1828. The building is a log construction. The octagonal shape typical for the area is elongated with a sacristy and church porch added to the main octagonal body. Tresfjord Municipality bought the church in 1902 from the local farmers and made the church public property. The church was renovated by Domenico Erdmann in 1927-1929. In the 1970s, steel wire stays were installed to support and straighten the building. After substantial repairs in 2006, the structure is now stable without supporting wire stays.

== Interior ==
The altar frontal above the pulpit dates from the early 14th century. It is an oil painting measuring 92 by 135 centimetres (36 in × 53 in). About 30 such medieval frontals exist in Norway, this is the only one not in a museum. The altar frontal is made from pine boards, and the cracks between boards are covered with parchment. There is old Norse writings on the parchment which shows that altar frontal was made in Norway. There was also an old carpet, probably an antependium, made from woven wool and linen, this carpet is now kept at Norwegian Museum of Cultural History.

The pulpit is in Renaissance style and was crafted by a local blacksmith in 1687 for the previous church.

The first organ was installed in 1921, previously hymns were sung without instrumental accompaniment. Clocks in the tower are from the 19th century.

The decorations in Tresfjord church are extremely refined and resonate with the architectural ideas of our own time with regard to both simplicity and stringent color use. The church is of wood, reminiscent of a big tent in their uprising and inside is a highly distinctive type, built as a temple tent carried by four pillars. This tent-architecture is accentuated by the light blue-starred loft suspended over the pillars between the whitewashed walls with a frieze under the roof ending downwards with lambreguins, a heavy drapery ornament.

— Domenico Erdman

Farms with ownership in the church had reserved seats with names painted on the small doors to each row of seats. Women were seated to the left, men to the right where there are still pegs for the men's hats.

Along the upper part of the wall around the entire nave there is a wide field of rosemaling. Four painted pillars (staves) support the roof. The rafters are decorated with green vines. The ceiling is decorated with blue stars. The interior was restored in 1928 and in 1968 (after leakage). There are five large paintings with biblical motives. Above the chancel there is a large painted rose with the Hebrew word Jehova. The balcony is decorated with Carl XIV Johan's monogram between two lions.

The interior includes a crucifix, an angel, and eucharist figures from an older church (possibly the 1690 church building). There is also a 1738 copy of the Bible. A collection box for donations to the poor needs two keys to open. The baptismal font originate from the previous church.

== Media gallery ==
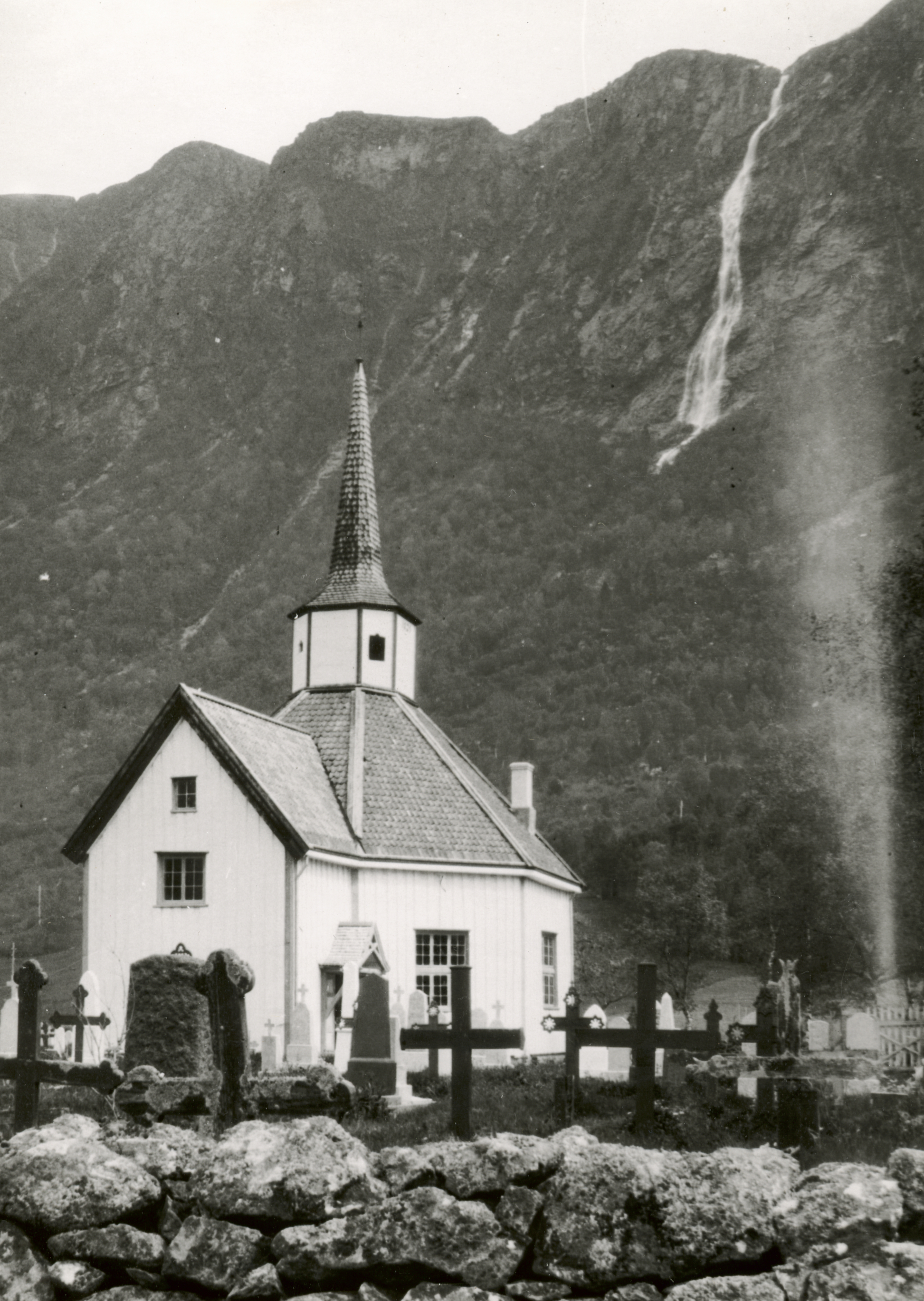

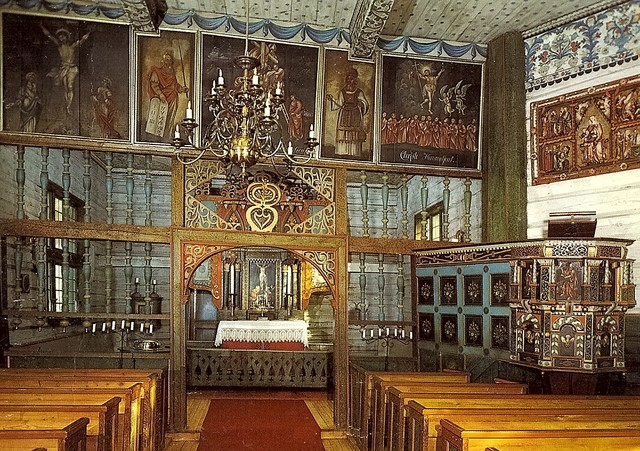
Interior.
Credit: kirkenorge.no

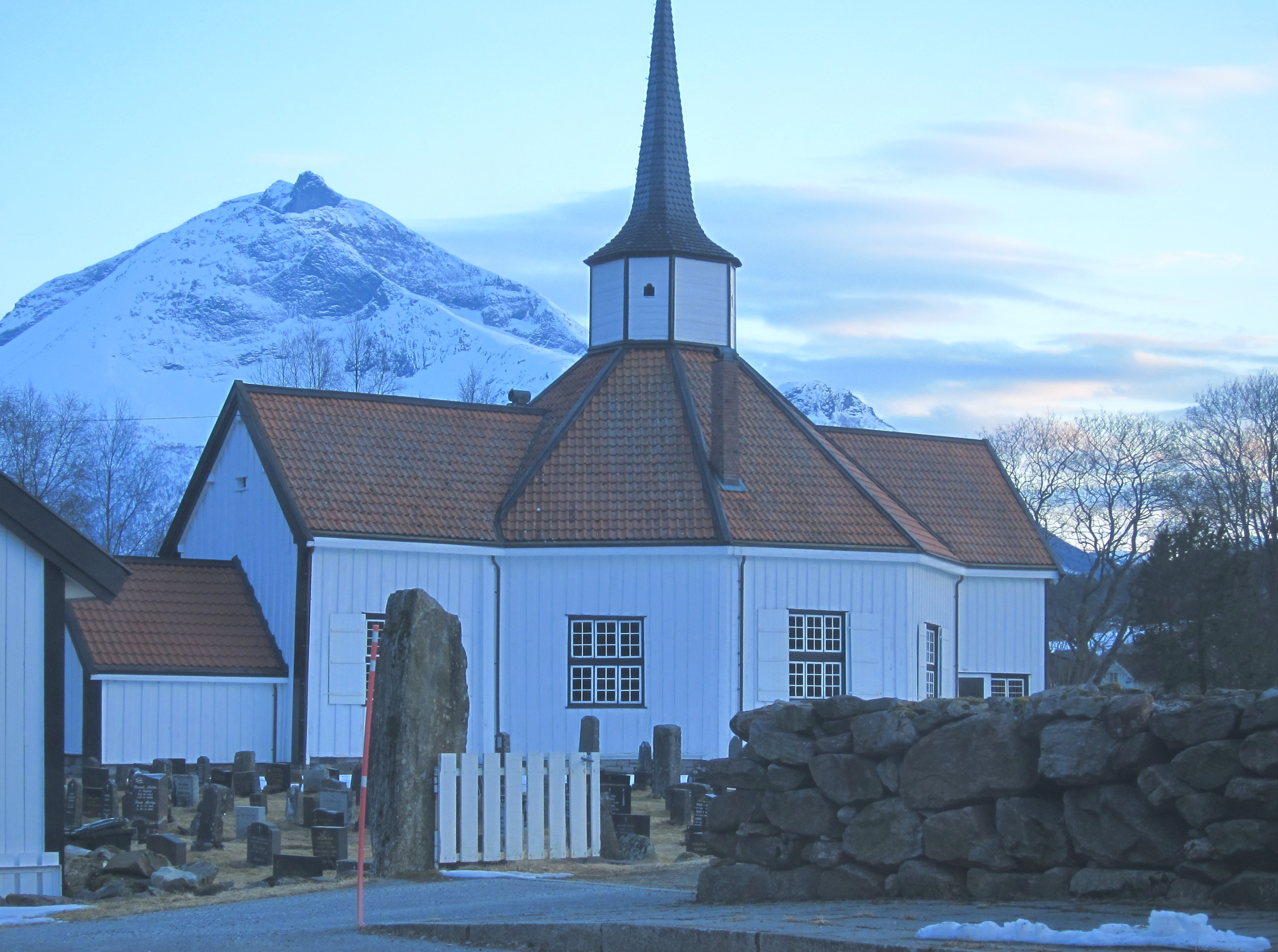

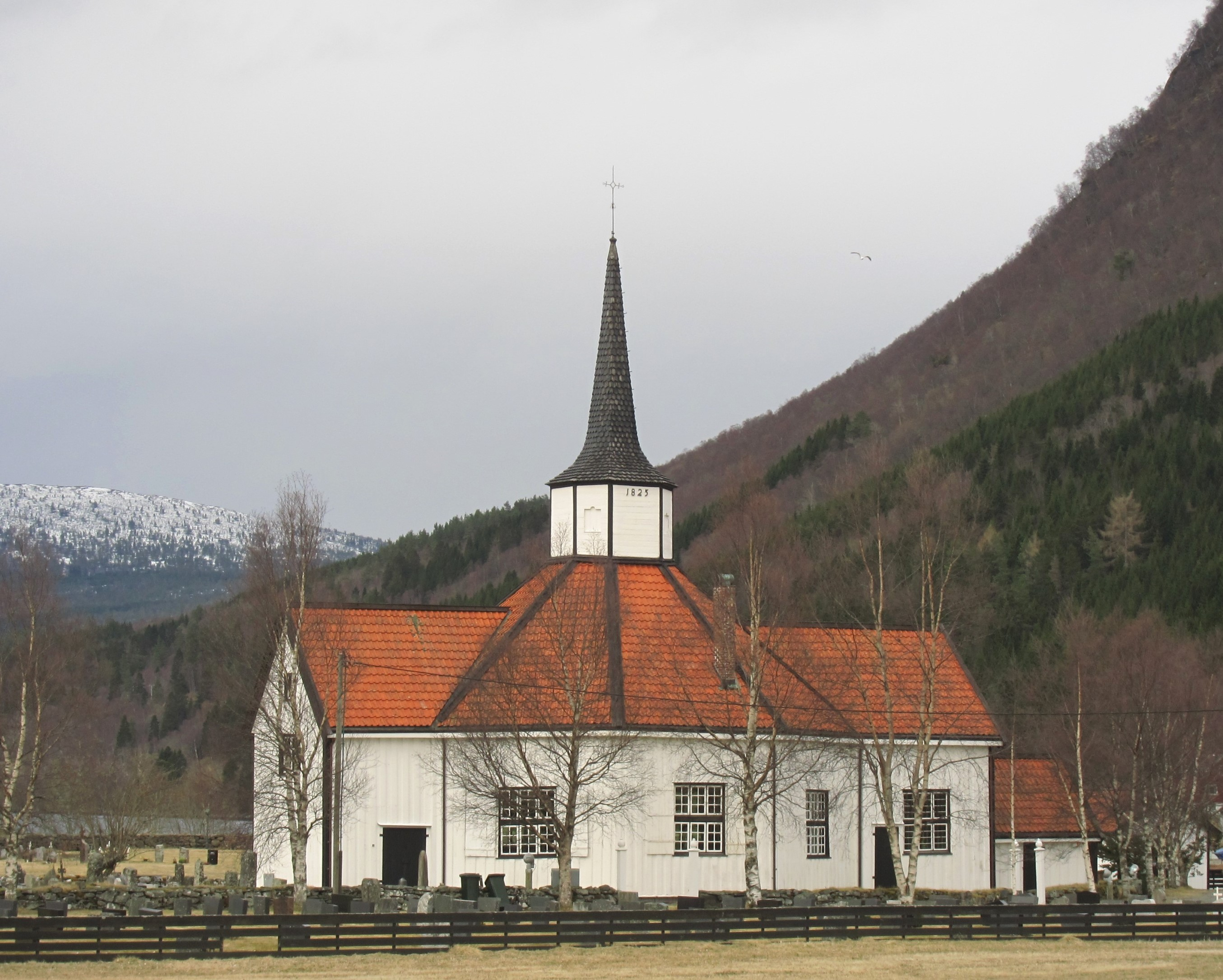

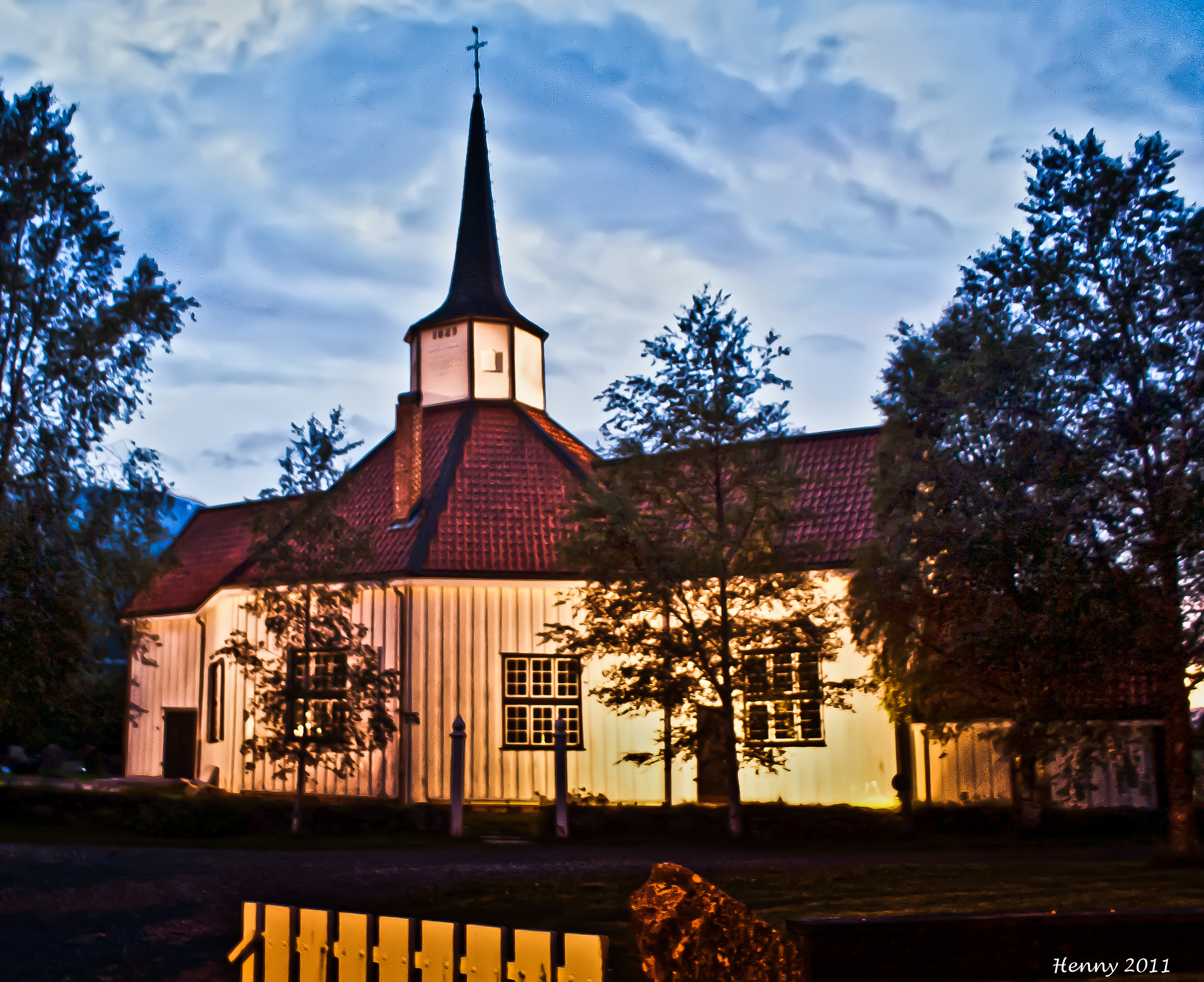

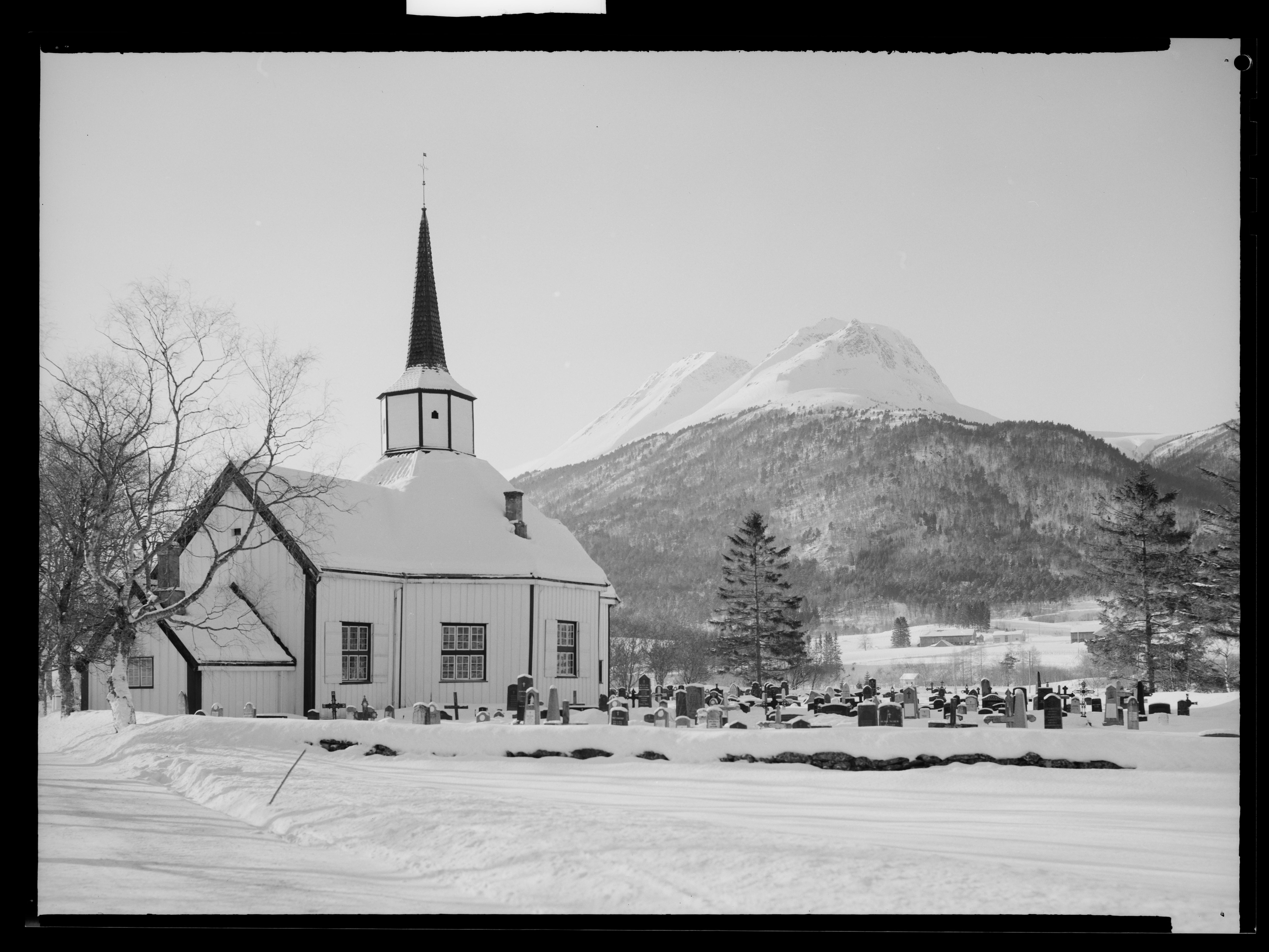

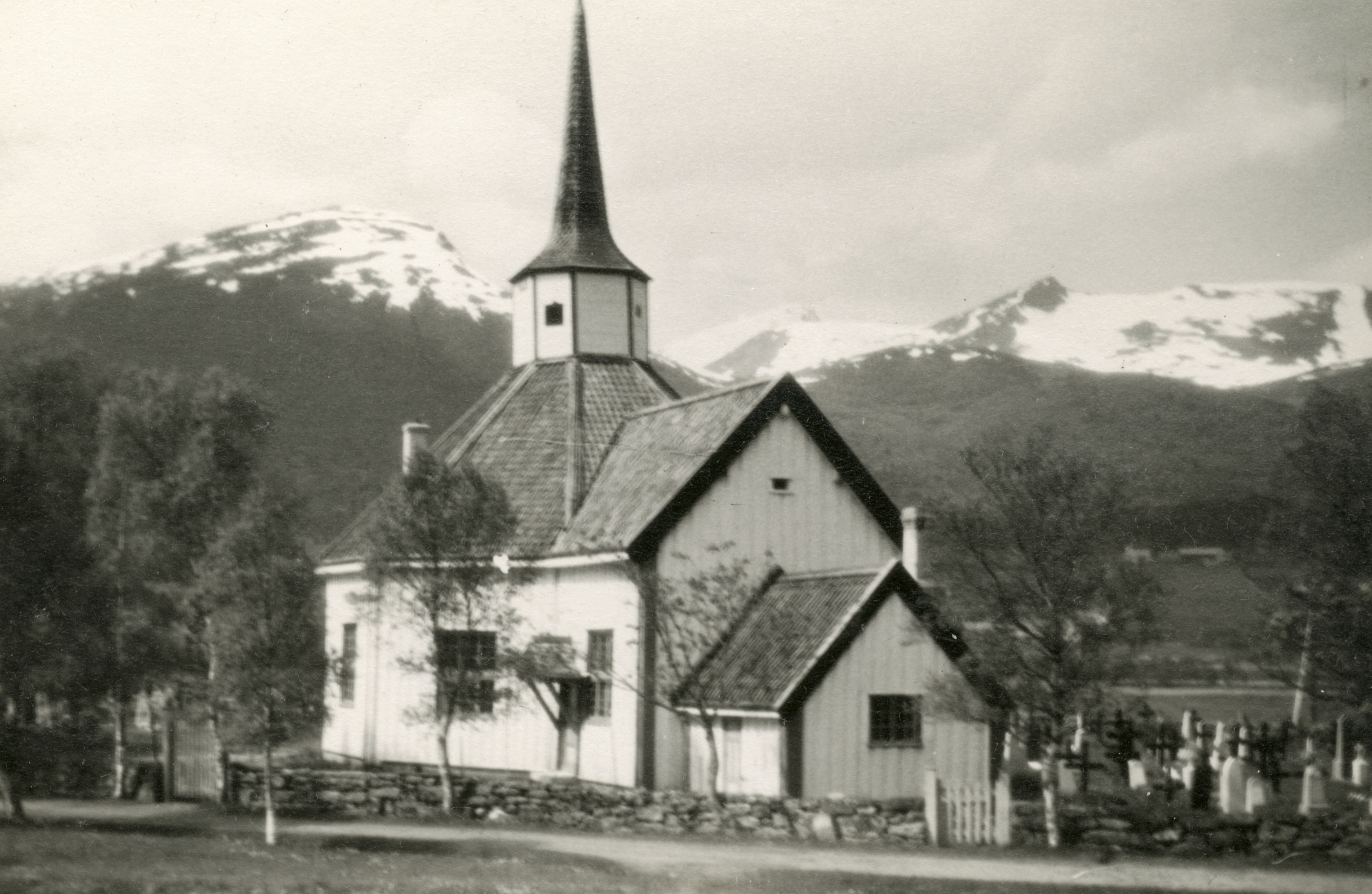

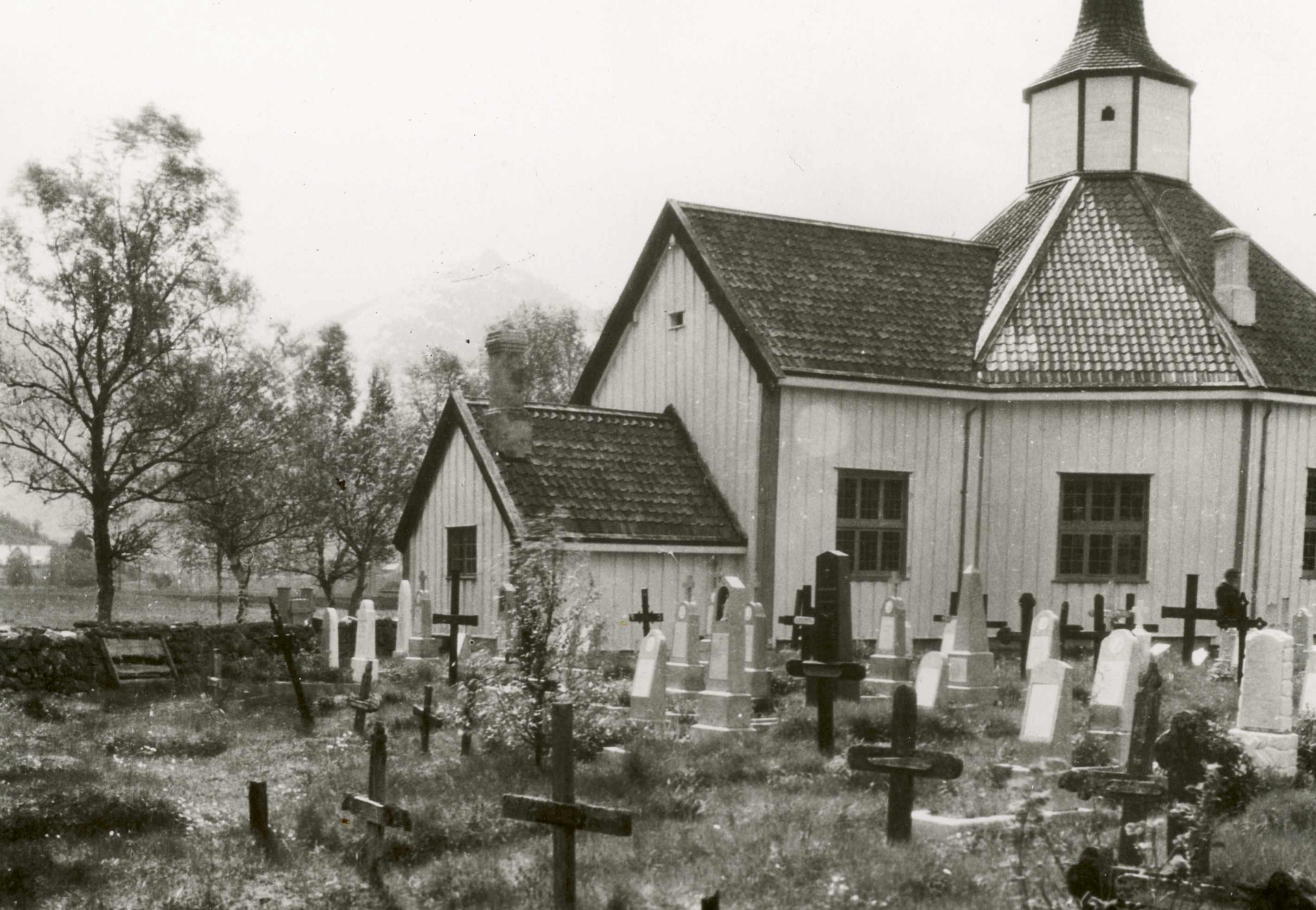

== See also ==
- List of churches in Møre
- Norddal Church
- Old Stordal Church
