= Tresfjorden =

Fjord in Vestnes, Norway

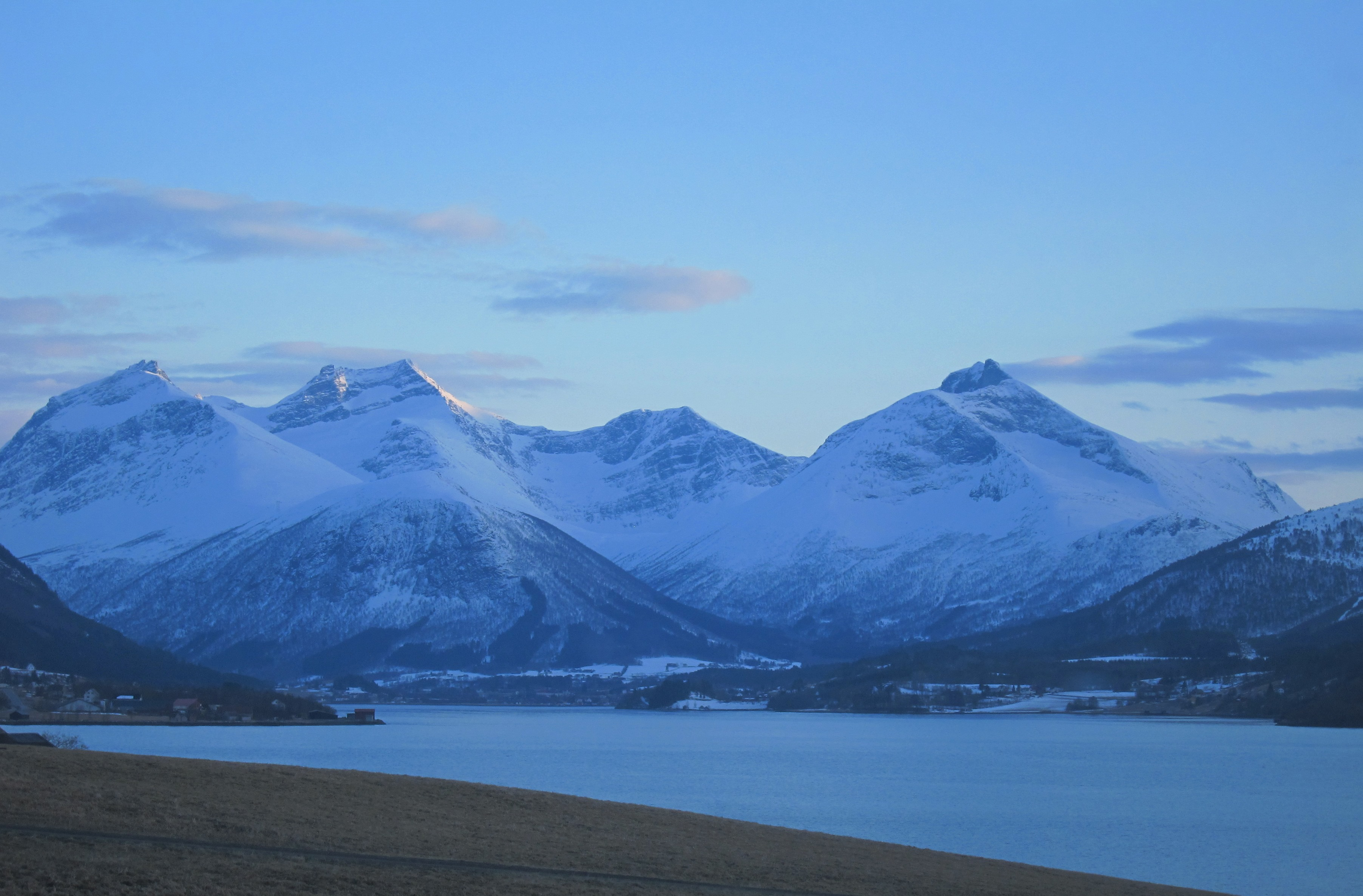
- View of the fjord
- Interactive map of the fjord
- Location: Møre og Romsdal county, Norway
- Coordinates: 62.5858°N 7.1257°E
- Type: Fjord
- Primary outflows: Romsdal Fjord
- Basin countries: Norway
- Max. length: 12 kilometres (7.5 mi)
- Settlements: Vestnes, Vikebukt

Tresfjorden (English: Tres Fjord) is a fjord in Vestnes Municipality in Møre og Romsdal county, Norway. The 12-kilometre (7.5 mi) long fjord branches off of the main Romsdal Fjord, and it is one of the two main fjords that cut into the municipality. The village of Vestnes sits at the mouth of the fjord (on the west side) and the village of Vikebukt sits at the mouth of the fjord (on the east side). The village of Tresfjord is located at the southern end of the fjord.

European route E39 runs along the northwest shore of the fjord, and European route E136 approaches the fjord from the east and crosses it over the Tresfjord Bridge. The bridge opened in 2015, crossing the northern part of the fjord just south of the villages of Vestnes and Vikebukt. The opening of the bridge resulted in E136 being re-routed over the bridge instead of following the east shore down and around the fjord.

The inner part of the fjord was historically part of the old Tresfjord Municipality which existed from 1899 until 1964.

== See also ==
- List of Norwegian Fjords
