= Tresfjord (village) =

Village in Vestnes Municipality, Norway

Tresfjorden Tresfjord
- Village
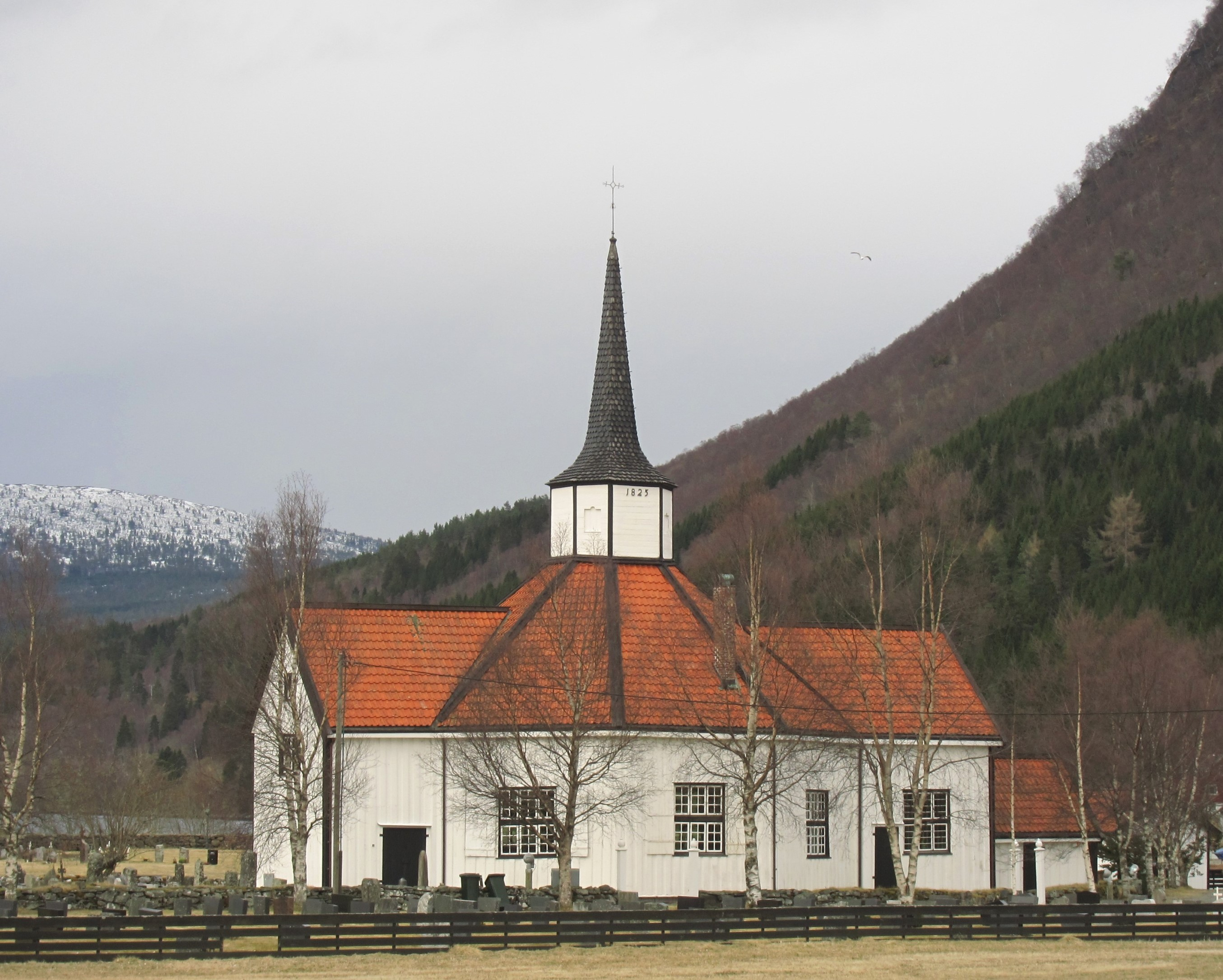
- Tresfjord church
- Interactive map of Tresfjorden
- Location within Møre og Romsdal Location within Norway
- Coordinates: 62.5249°N 7.1258°E
- Country: Norway
- Region: Western Norway
- County: Møre og Romsdal
- District: Romsdal
- Municipality: Vestnes Municipality

Area
  - Total: 0.49 km^{2} (0.19 sq mi)
- Elevation: 11 m (36 ft)

Population (2024)
  - Total: 219
  - Density: 447/km^{2} (1,160/sq mi)
- Time zone: UTC+01:00 (CET)
  - Summer (DST): UTC+02:00 (CEST)
- Post Code: 6391 Tresfjord

Tresfjorden or Tresfjord is a village in Vestnes Municipality in Møre og Romsdal county, Norway. The village is located at the southern end of the fjord, also named Tresfjorden. The village sits about 12 kilometres (7.5 mi) south of the large village of Vestnes. The river Tressa empties into the Tresfjorden at this village.

The 0.49-square-kilometre (120-acre) village has a population (2024) of 219 and a population density of 447 inhabitants per square kilometre (1,160/sq mi).

The village has a Tine dairy and some other small industries. The Tresfjord Church is an octagonal church dating back to 1828 and it has an altarpiece from the 14th century. There is also the Tresfjord Museum, an open-air museum with old houses and equipment from the village.

The European route E136 highway used to run through Tresfjord, but the Tresfjord Bridge opened in 2015 and the highway was re-routed over the bridge, rather than around the shoreline of the fjord, so the highway no longer runs through the village of Tresfjord.
