= Tresfjord Bridge =

Tresfjord Bridge Tresfjordbrua
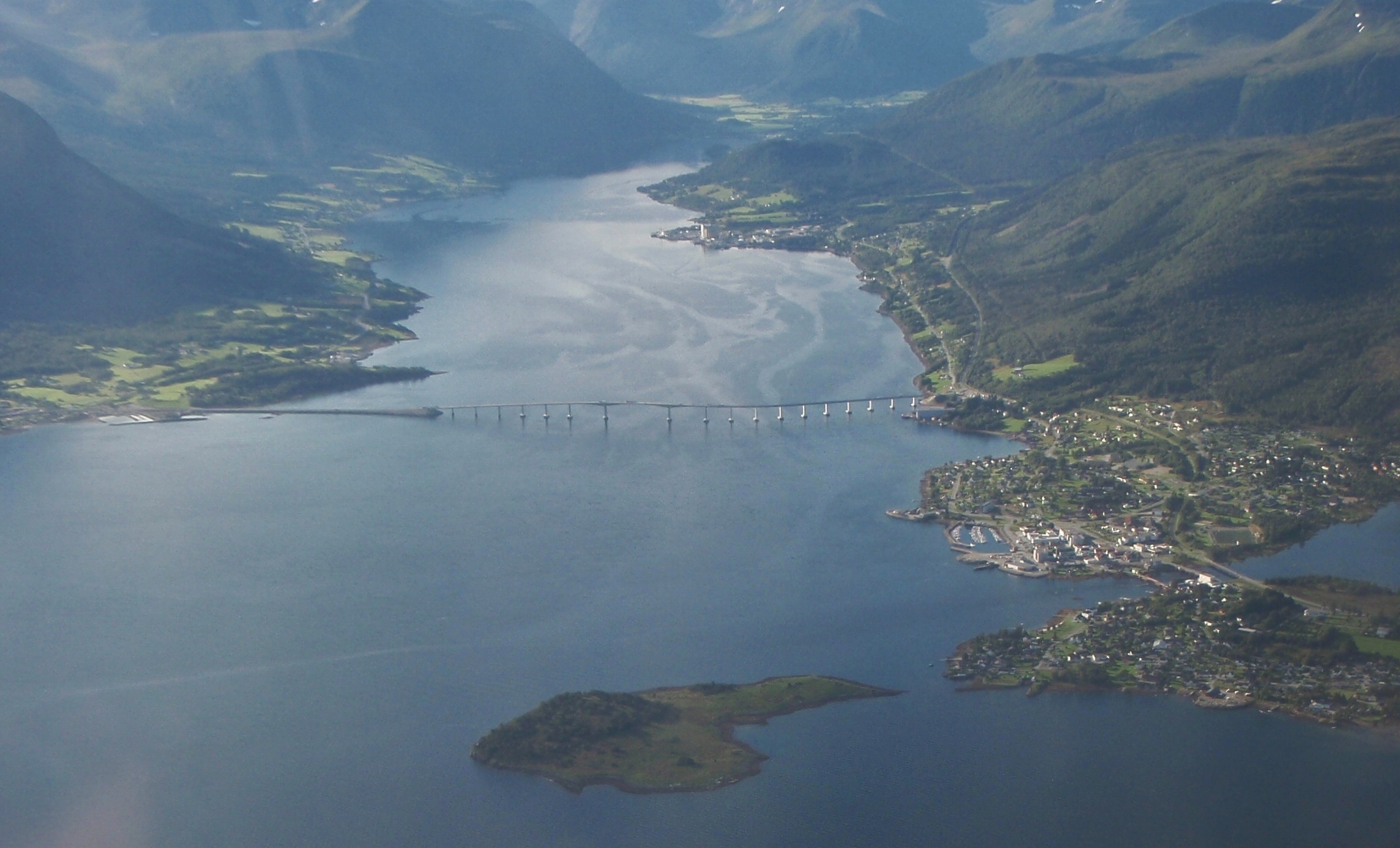
- View of the bridge
- Coordinates: 62°36′41″N 7°06′47″E
- Carries: E136
- Crosses: Tresfjorden
- Locale: Vestnes, Norway

Characteristics
- Total length: 1,290 metres (4,230 ft)
- No. of spans: 3
- Clearance below: 55 metres (180 ft)

History
- Construction start: 2012
- Construction end: 2015

The Tresfjord Bridge (Norwegian: Tresfjordbrua) is a box girder bridge in Vestnes Municipality in Møre og Romsdal county, Norway.

The 1,290-metre-long (4,230 ft) bridge crosses the Tresfjorden from Remmem (just south of the village of Vestnes) on the west shore to the village of Vikebukt on the east shore. The bridge carries the European route E136 highway over the fjord, re-routing it from its former path that ran all the way around the shoreline of Tresfjorden. There is a 55-metre (180 ft) clearance below the bridge for passing boats.

The bridge officially opened to traffic on 24 October 2015. The prime minister Erna Solberg was at the opening ceremony, stepping in for the Minister of Transport, Ketil Solvik-Olsen.
