= European route E136 =

Road in trans-European E-road network

E136

Major junctions
- West end: Ålesund
- East end: Dombås

Location
- Countries: Norway

Highway system
- International E-road network; A Class; B Class

European route E136 is a European highway located entirely in Møre og Romsdal and Innlandet counties in Norway. The highway begins in the town of Ålesund in Møre og Romsdal county on the west coast of Norway, and it goes east up through the Romsdalen valley, crossing into the upper Gudbrandsdalen Valley to end at the village of Dombås in Dovre Municipality in Innlandet county.

== Møre og Romsdal county ==
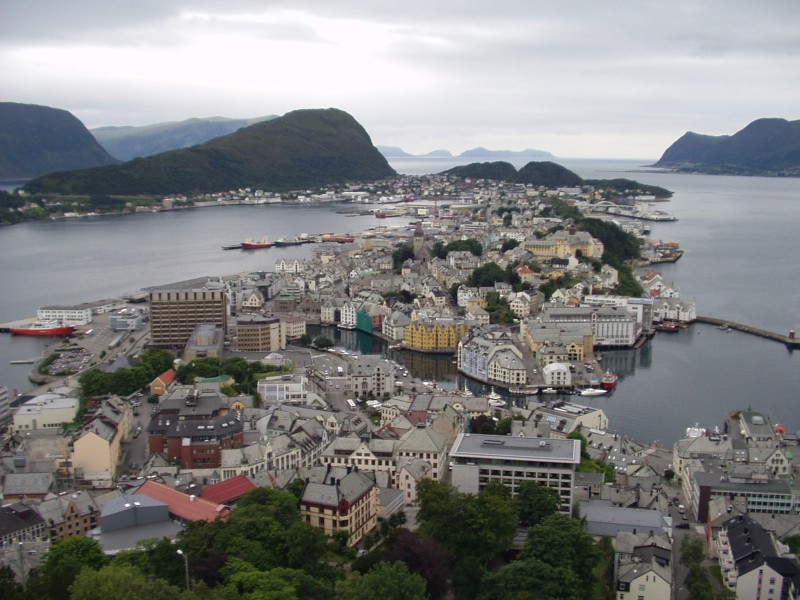
Ålesund

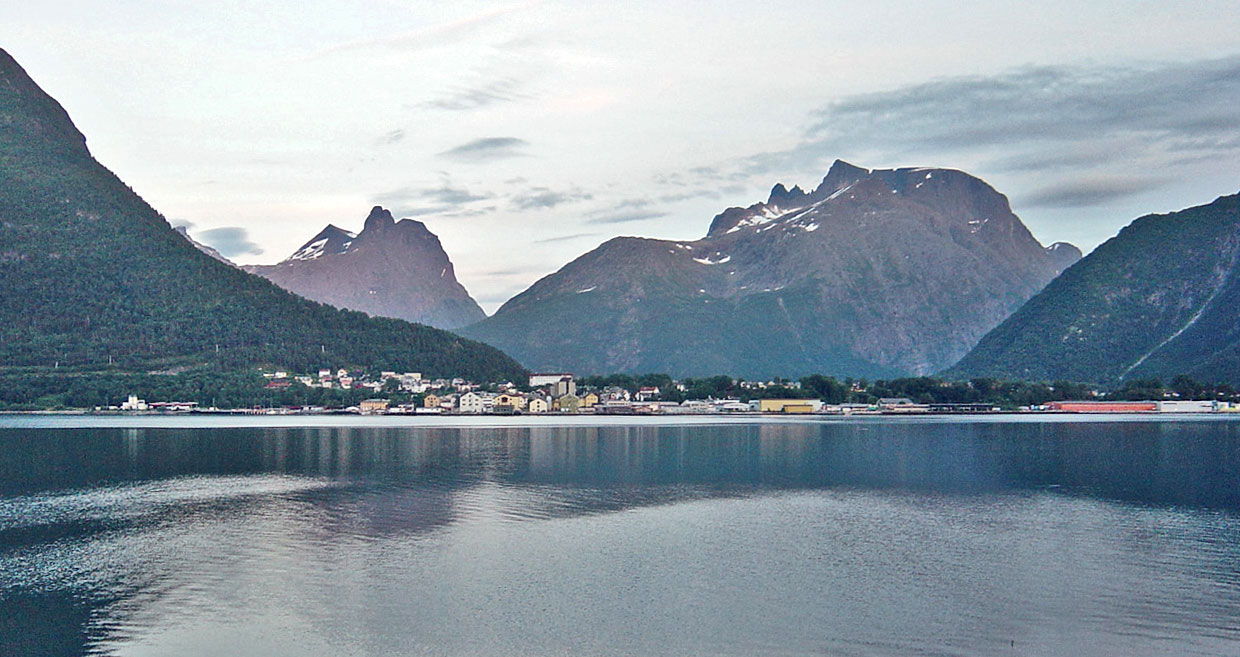
Åndalsnes

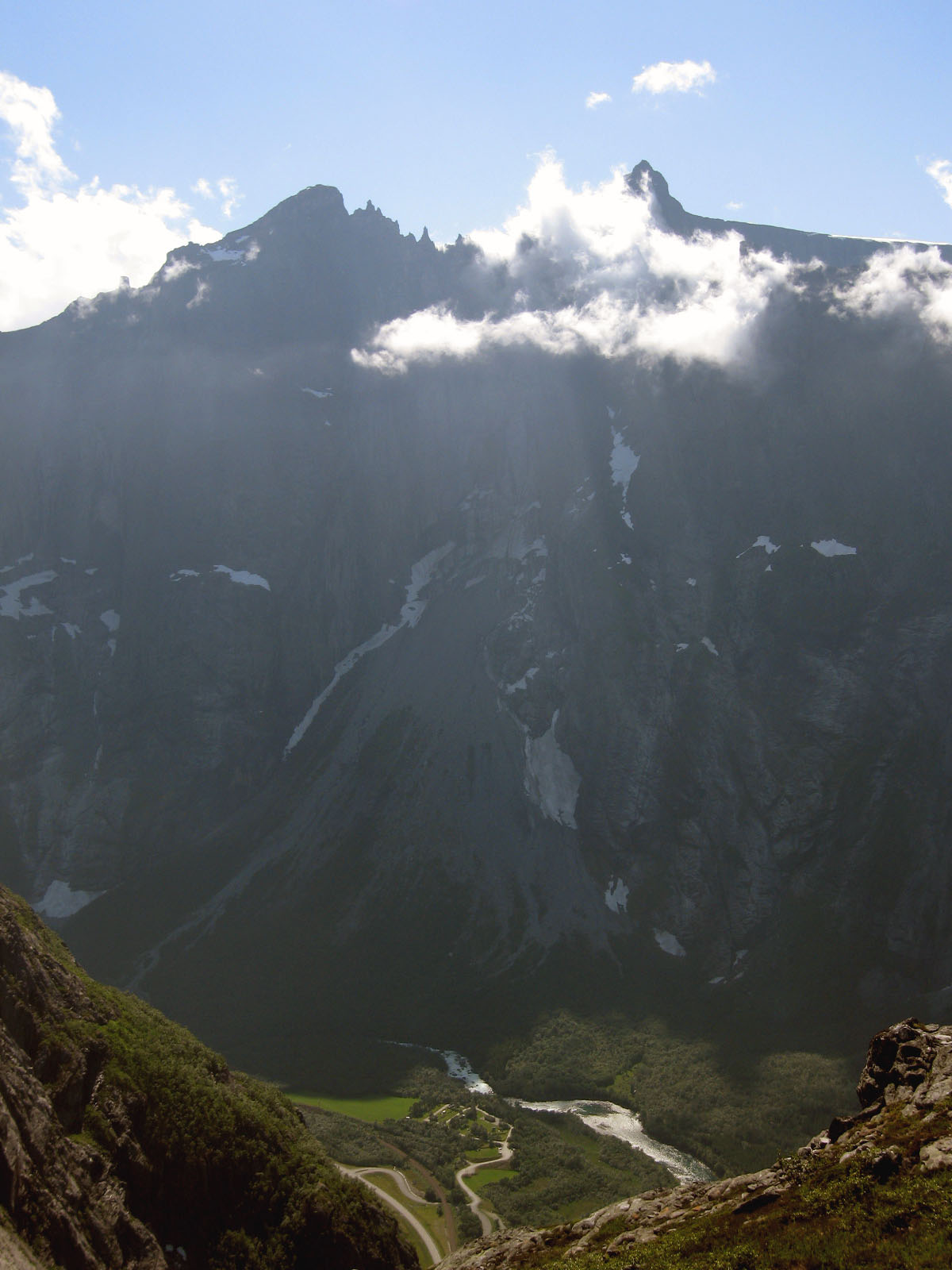
Trollveggen in Romsdal

=== Ålesund municipality ===
- Rv658 Ålesund, to Ålesund Airport, Vigra
- E39 at Spjelkavik (jointly with E136 until Vestnes in Vestnes Municipality)
- Sørnes Tunnel (236 m)
- Rv111 Brusdal
- Fv650 Sjøholt

=== Vestnes municipality ===
- E39 at Vestnes (jointly with E136 from Spjelkavika in Ålesund)
- Tresfjord Bridge over the Tresfjorden

=== Rauma municipality ===
- Vågstrand Tunnel (3,665 m)
- Måndal Tunnel (2,080 m)
- Innfjord Tunnel (6,594 m)
- Rauma Bridge over the Rauma River (140 m)
- Fv64 Åndalsnes
- Fv63 Sogge Bridge at Åndalsnes

== Innlandet county ==
=== Lesja municipality ===
- Fv476 at Lesja

=== Dovre municipality ===
- E6 at Dombås
