= Romsdal =

District in the Norwegian county Møre og Romsdal

Coordinates: 62°40′N 7°50′E

Romsdal highlighted in red

Romsdal is a traditional district in the Norwegian county Møre og Romsdal, located between Nordmøre and Sunnmøre. The district of Romsdal traditional comprises the areas that are part of Aukra Municipality, Molde Municipality, Rauma Municipality, and Vestnes Municipality plus the old Sandøy Municipality (now part of Ålesund Municipality) and the old Fræna Municipality (now part of Hustadvika Municipality). It is named after the valley of Romsdalen, which covers part of Rauma Municipality.

The largest town is Molde, which is also the seat of Møre og Romsdal County Municipality. Åndalsnes is a town located near the mouth of the river Rauma in Rauma Municipality. The Rauma Line railway comes from Dombås and terminates at Åndalsnes.

== Naming ==
The Old Norse form of the name was Raumsdalr. The first element is the genitive case of a name *Raumr, probably the old (uncompounded) name of Romsdal Fjord, again derived from the name of the river Rauma, i.e. "The Dale of Rauma". The name Rauma is itself a mystery, but a tantalizing clue may be found in the works of the Gothic historian Jordanes. He mentions a tribe called "Raumii", which might be the origin of both the landscape Romerike (o.no raumariki) and the river Rauma.

The Norwegian comedy group KLM (named after the surnames of the three comedians Trond Kirkvaag, Knut Lystad and Lars Mjøen), in their feuilleton series Brødrene Dal (The Brothers Dale – as in 'valley'), named their three protagonists after the valleys Gausdal, Romsdal, and Brumunddal.

== Geography ==
The valley of Romsdalen, through which the Rauma river passes to the Romsdalfjord. It is surrounded by the Romsdalsalpene mountain range. The 1,550-meter-tall (5,090 ft) Romsdalhorn has been compared to the Matterhorn. Trolltindane peaks stands opposite across the Rauma. The North Face of Trollryggen peak (1,740 m), Trollveggen (Troll Wall), is the tallest vertical cliff in Europe. Norway's most famous hair-pin road is Trollstigen, or "Troll's Trail", which leads to the south out of Åndalsnes to the Norddalsfjorden and Tafjorden.

The Rauma river originates in Lesjaskogsvatnet, a lake with outlets at both ends, in the adjacent, mountainous Lesja Municipality. A dam was constructed by the Lesja Iron Works in the 1660s to improve transportation obstructed the Rauma and caused the water to flow both west to the Rauma and eastward into the river Lågen.

== History ==
=== Legendary history ===
According to legend, Romsdal is an eponym after Raum the Old, son of the equally eponymous Nór who appears in Hversu Noregr byggðist as the legendary founder of Norway. Jøtunbjørn the Old was the son of Raum the Old and Bergdis, a giant's daughter. He inherited Raumsdal (modern: Romsdal) from his father, and was himself the father of King Raum, who was the father of Hrossbjörn, who was the father of Orm Broken-shell, who was the father of Knatti, who had two sons: Thórolf and Ketill Raum (in one version, Thórolf and Ketill Raum are sons of Orm). According to legend, among Thórolf's descendants came some of the first settlers of Iceland.

The Laxdæla saga says that Raumsdal was the home of Ketill Flatnose, a descendant of Ketill Raum. In the 850s, Ketil was a prominent chieftain. He conquered the Hebrides and the Isle of Man. Some sources refer to him as "King of the Sudreys" (Hebrides), but there is little evidence that he himself claimed that title. Harald Fairhair appointed him the ruler of these islands, but he failed to pay tribute to the Norwegian king and was outlawed. He and his family left Norway and fled westwards across the sea, to Scotland, then Ireland, where he married off his daughter, Aud the Deep-Minded, to Olaf the White, king of Dublin. Aud went eventually to Iceland where she began that country's shift to Christianity.

=== 9th century ===
Before Harald Fairhair, Romsdal was a petty kingdom. Ragnvald Eysteinsson (Ragnvald Mørejarl) was jarl of Møre, which was roughly equivalent to today's Møre og Romsdal. He died at the Orkney Islands. He was son of King Eystein "Glumra (the Noisy)" Ivarsson of Oppland, and a contemporary of Harald Fairhair whom he supported in the unification process and from whom he received his fiefdom. He is likely to have resided on or nearby the important township of Veøya, Romsdal's Viking Age hub for commerce and communication. The legend says Ragnvald was the one to cut the hair of Harald Fairhair after he became king over all of Norway.

Ragnvald Eysteinsson was the father of several sons. With Ragnhild Rolfsdatter, he had the sons: Tore (Thorir Ragnvaldsson) who inherited the earldom after his father's death and Hrolf Ganger (Hrólfr Ragnvaldsson). Although historians are quite divided its accuracy in this regard, the Orkneyinga saga claims Hrolf Ganger is identical to Rollo of Normandy ancestor of William I of England. Turf-Einar (Einarr Ragnvaldsson), a son by a concubine, was an ancestor of the Norse Earls of Orkney.

=== 12th century ===
In 1122, while staying as a guest at the village of Hustad in Romsdal, King Eystein I was taken ill and died. His body was taken in impressive funeral procession to burial at Nidaros.

At Veøy, an island in the middle of the Romsdalfjord, there had been in time immemorial a religious site. At the close of the 12th century, Veøy Church, a church dedicated to St. Peter, was constructed over an ancient site of pagan worship.

=== 17th century ===
During the 1600s, Romsdal market (Romsdalsmarkedet) was opened as a trading center at Devold on the Rauma river upstream from Åndalsnes. The market was moved from Devold to Veblungsnes in 1820. This was an important outlet for the ironworks at Lesja, providing an outlet for their products as well as a source of supplies. Molde later inherited the role as the principal market town for the region.

A Scottish mercenary force landed in Romsdal at Isfjorden on its way to Sweden. The incursion was stopped at the Battle of Kringen.

In the 1658 Treaty of Roskilde, the Trondheim region of Norway was ceded to Sweden, down to the north bank of the Romsdalfjord. The Romsdal farmers defied the Swedish taxes and military conscription, and the Swedish governor was forced to send a full company of soldiers, and 50 cavalry besides, to collect taxes. Following the attack on Copenhagen and the city's successful defence, and the reconquest by Norwegian forces of Trondheim, the Treaty of Copenhagen in 1660 restored that province to Norway. The few months of experience with Swedish taxation and conscription left such a bitter taste that it strengthened Norwegian unity and patriotism, making resistance to Swedish invasions of Norway stronger over the next 80 years.

=== 20th century ===
After the World War II German Military invasion of Norway in April 1940, British troops landed in Åndalsnes as a part of a pincer movement to retake the key mid-Norwegian city of Trondheim.

== See also ==
- Nordmøre
- Sunnmøre

== Related Reading ==
- Welle-Strand, Erling (1996). Adventure Roads in Norway. Nortrabooks. ISBN 9788290103717.
- Stagg, Frank Noel (1954). West Norway and its Fjords. London: George Allen & Unwin, Ltd. ISBN 9781013668005.
- Stagg, Frank Noel (1953). The Heart of Norway. London: George Allen & Unwin, Ltd. ISBN 9781015147539.
