= Stagg =

Stagg is a surname. Notable people with the surname include:

- Amos Alonzo Stagg (1862–1965), American collegiate coach in multiple sports, primarily football
- Amos Alonzo Stagg Jr. (1899–1996), American football player and coach
- Barry Stagg (born 1944), Canadian musician, composer and playwright
- C. Tracey Stagg (1878–1939), American politician from New York
- Charlotte Stagg, British neurophysiologist
- Colin Stagg, man wrongly imprisoned in the Rachel Nickell murder case (1992)
- David Stagg (born 1983), Australian rugby player
- Emmet Stagg (born 1944), Irish politician
- Frank Stagg (disambiguation), several people
- James Stagg (1900–1975), British meteorologist, persuaded General Eisenhower to change the date of D-Day
- John Stagg (poet) (1770–1823), English poet
- Lindsey Stagg (born 1970), English child actor
- Paul Stagg (1909–1992), American football player, coach, and athletics administrator
- Peter Stagg (born 1941), Scottish rugby player
- Sir Richard Stagg (born 1955), British diplomat
- Siobhan Stagg (born 1987), Australian operatic soprano
- Simon Stagg, a fictional character published by DC Comics
- Tom Stagg (judge) (1923–2015), American judge from Louisiana

== See also ==
- George T. Stagg, a limited-production bourbon whiskey distributed by Buffalo Trace Distillery
- Stagg Chili, a brand of chili con carne made by Hormel
- Stagg Field, two different football fields for the University of Chicago
- Stagg Memorial Stadium, a 28,000-seat multi-purpose stadium in Stockton, California
- Stagg Music, a Flemish musical instrument manufacturer
- SS John Stagg, a tanker ship (1943–1968)
- Jonathan Stagge, one of the pseudonyms used by the mystery writers known as Patrick Quentin
- Leeroy Stagger, Canadian singer
- Staggs (disambiguation)
- Stag (disambiguation)
