= Kors Church =

Church in Møre og Romsdal, Norway

- Kors kyrkje
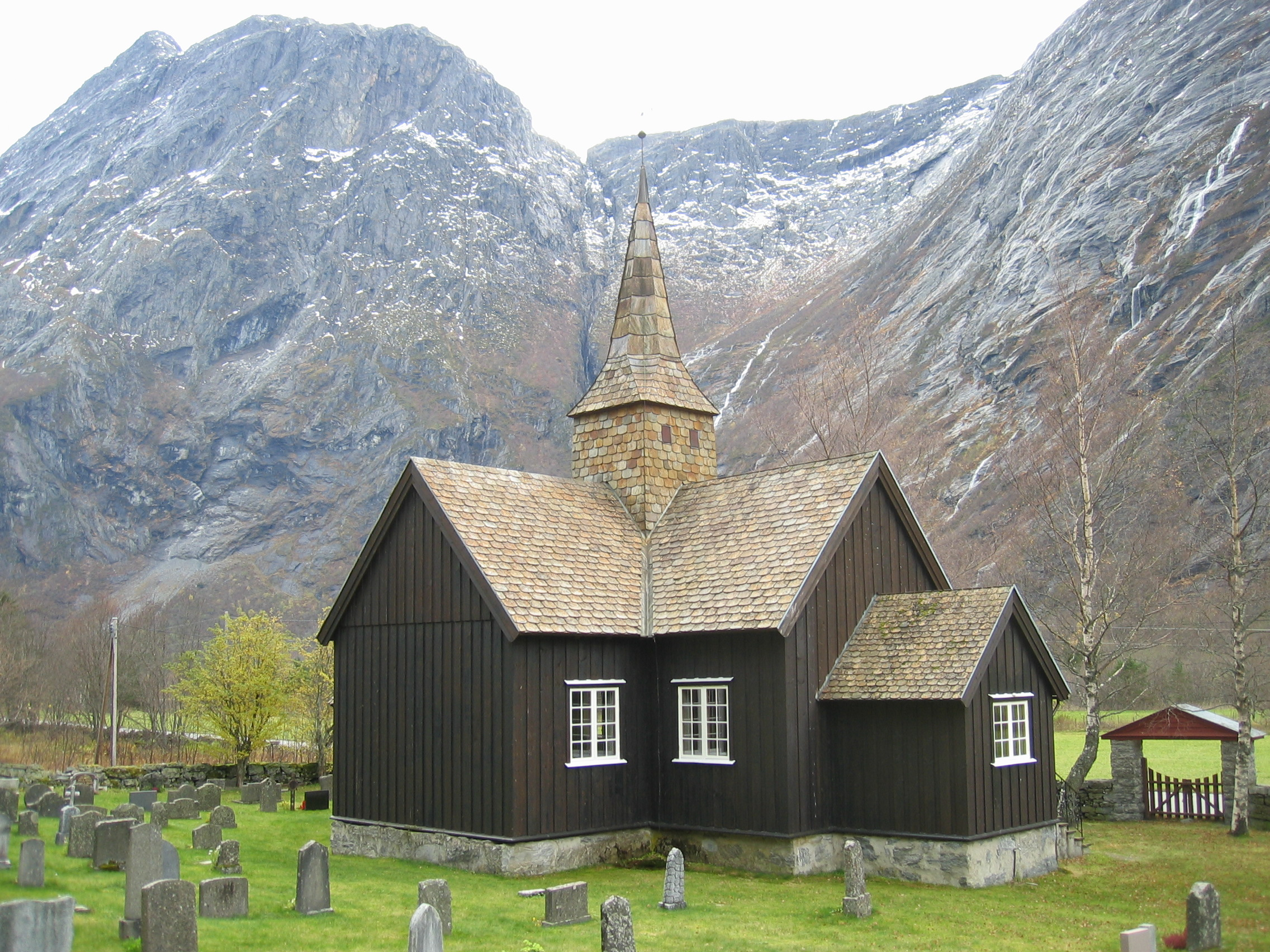
- View of the church
- Kors Church
- 62°26′17″N 7°51′00″E
- Location: Rauma Municipality, Møre og Romsdal
- Country: Norway
- Denomination: Church of Norway
- Churchmanship: Evangelical Lutheran

History
- Status: Parish church
- Founded: 15th century
- Consecrated: 1902
- Events: 1901: Moved to a new site

Architecture
- Functional status: Active
- Architectural type: Cruciform
- Completed: 1797 (229 years ago)

Specifications
- Capacity: 120
- Materials: Wood

Administration
- Diocese: Møre bispedømme
- Deanery: Indre Romsdal prosti
- Parish: Kors
- Norwegian Cultural Heritage Site
- Type: Church
- Status: Listed
- ID: 84823

Kors Church (Norwegian: Kors kyrkje) is a parish church of the Church of Norway in Rauma Municipality in Møre og Romsdal county, Norway. It is located in the village of Marstein in the central part of the Romsdalen valley. It is the church for the Kors parish which is part of the Indre Romsdal prosti (deanery) in the Diocese of Møre. The brown, wooden church was built in a cruciform design in 1797 using plans drawn up by an unknown architect. The church seats about 120 people.

== History ==
The earliest existing historical records of the church in the Romsdalen valley date back to the year 1497, but the church was not built that year. The first church was a wooden stave church that was probably located at Flatmark in the central Romsdalen valley, about 6 kilometres (3.7 mi) from the present church location (some sources say the first church was at Foss, about 5 kilometres (3.1 mi) further upstream from Flatmark). It was likely built during the 14th century. The old church was replaced during the 1660s with a new church at Flatmark. In 1797, the church was torn down and replaced by a new timber-framed cruciform church. The church was surrounded by a cemetery which, in turn, was surrounded by large, tall trees.

The church has served the residents of the inner Romsdalen valley for centuries from the 1400s onwards. After a long-standing controversy about the location of the future church, it was decided by a Royal Decree on 23 March 1901 that the Øverdalen Chapel would be built to serve the southern part of the valley. Moreover, the Kors Church would be moved farther to the northeast and it would serve the central part of the valley. So, in 1901, the church was disassembled, moved, and rebuilt about 6 kilometres (3.7 mi) down the valley to Marstein where it is now located. The building was rebuilt with some new materials and a somewhat more neo-Gothic look by the lead builder L. Sæther. The newly rebuilt church was consecrated in 1902. It fell into disrepair over time, but was renovated and restored to its original appearance in 1964 under the leadership of Torgeir Suul.

== Media gallery ==
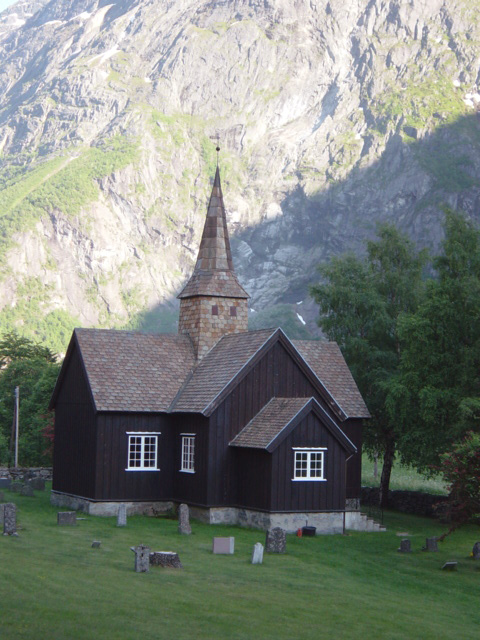

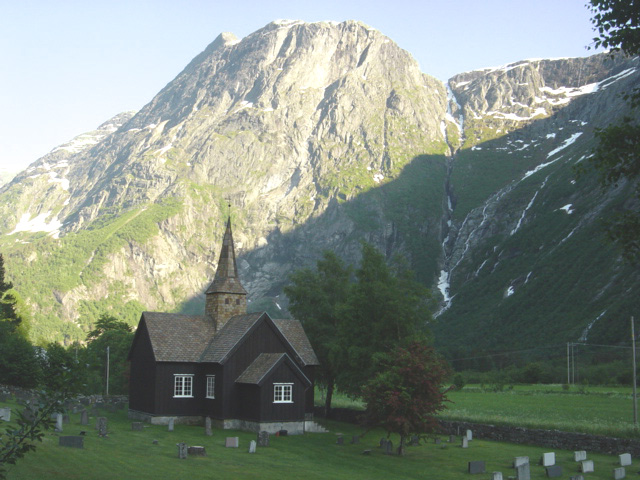

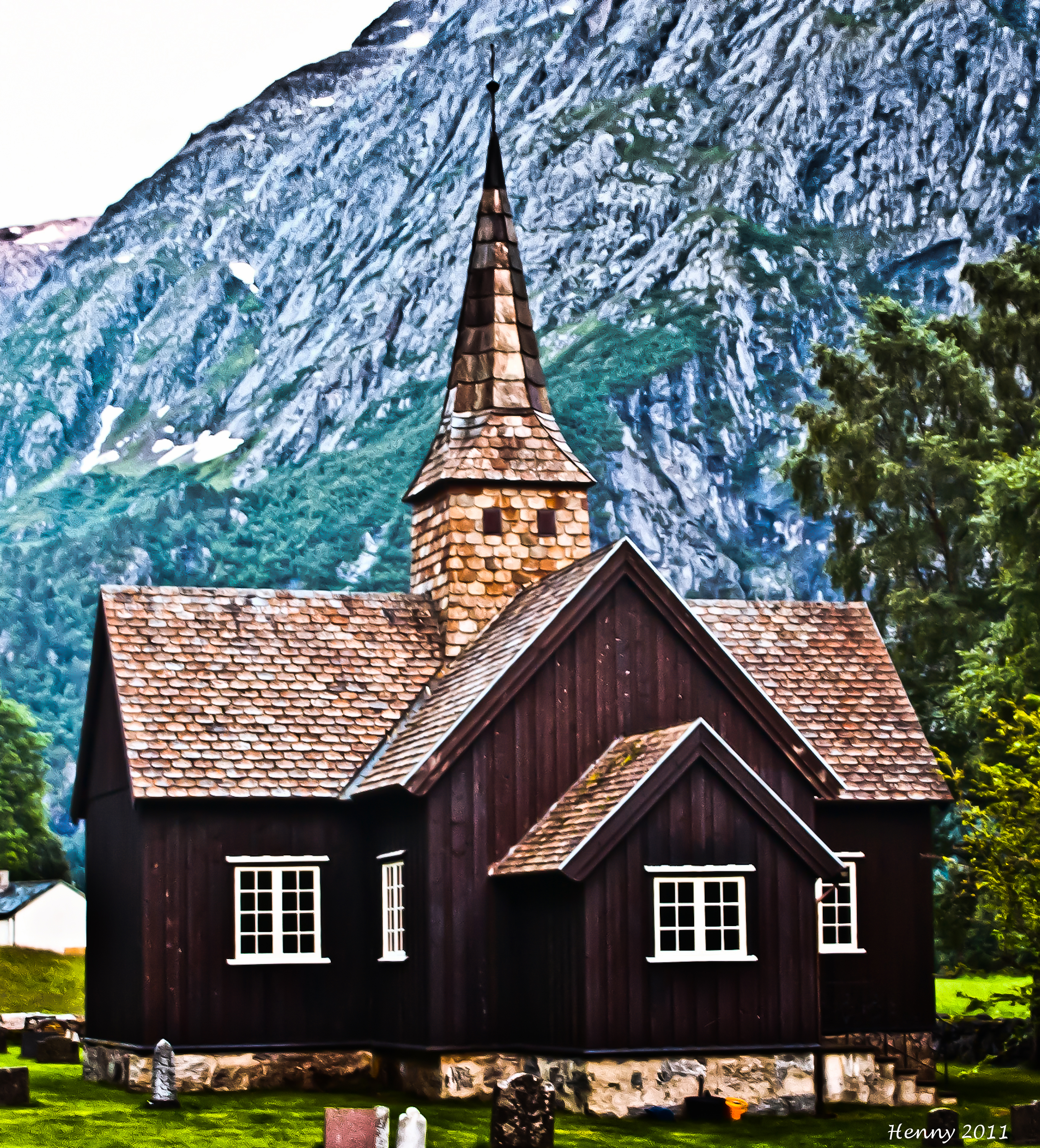

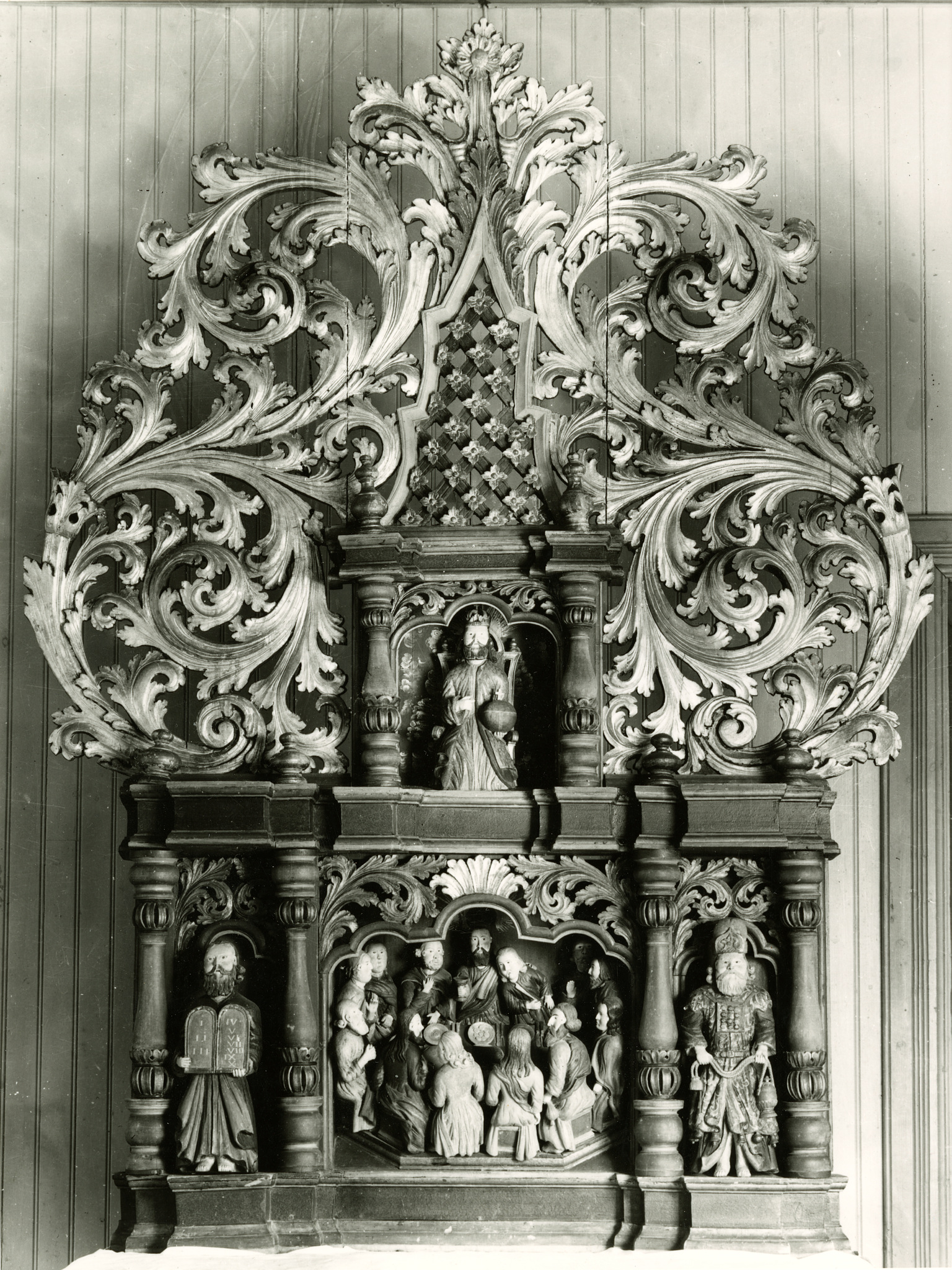

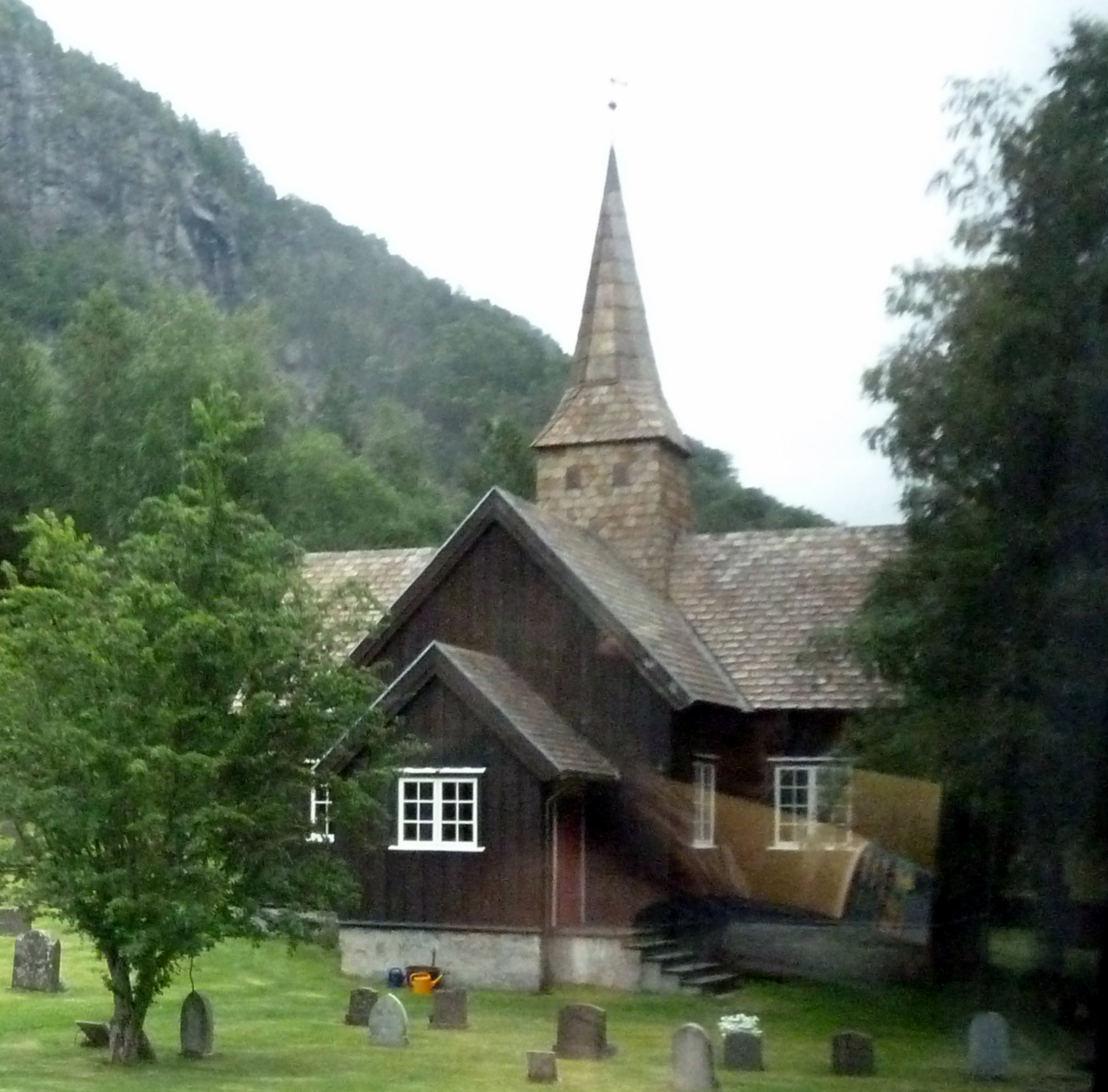

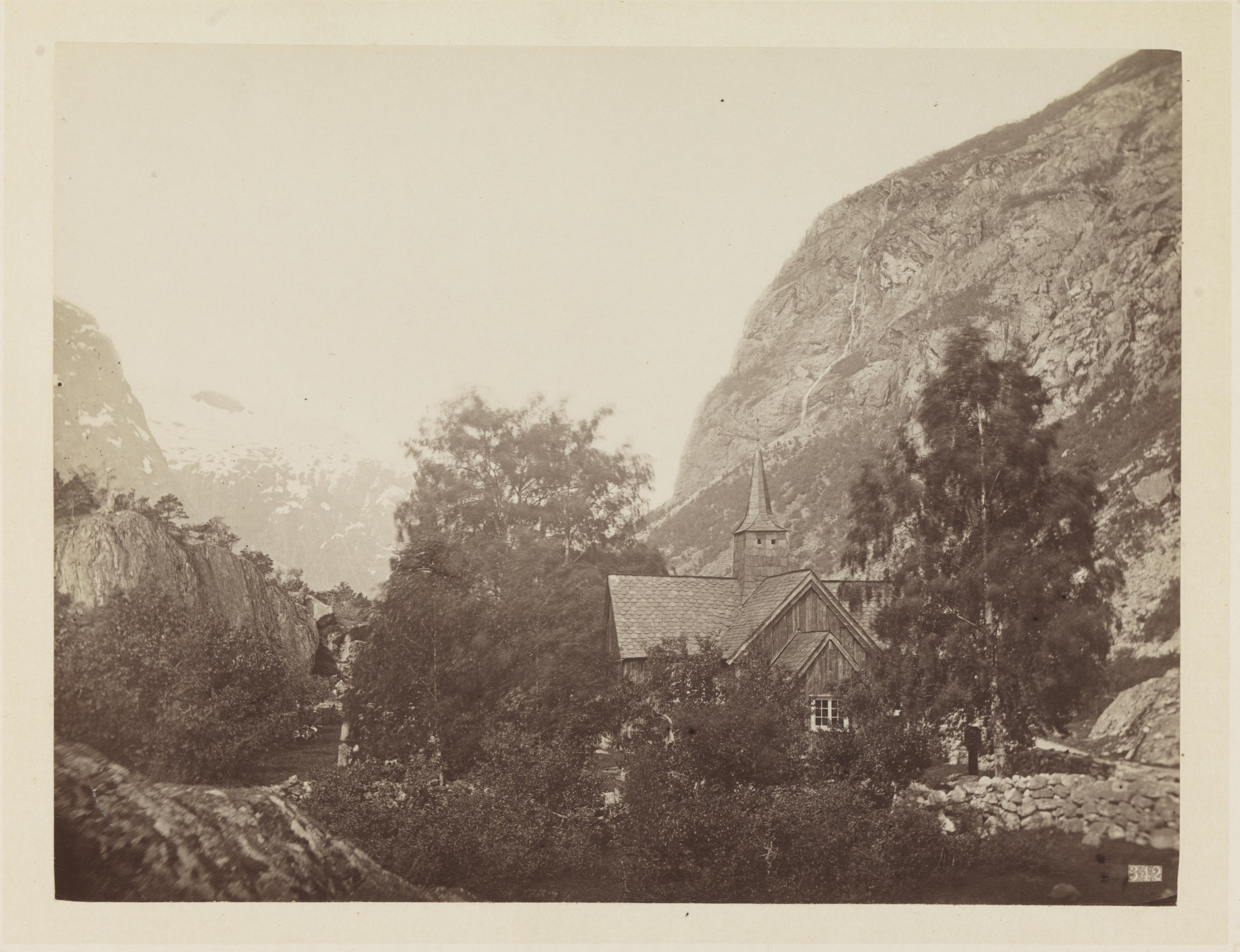

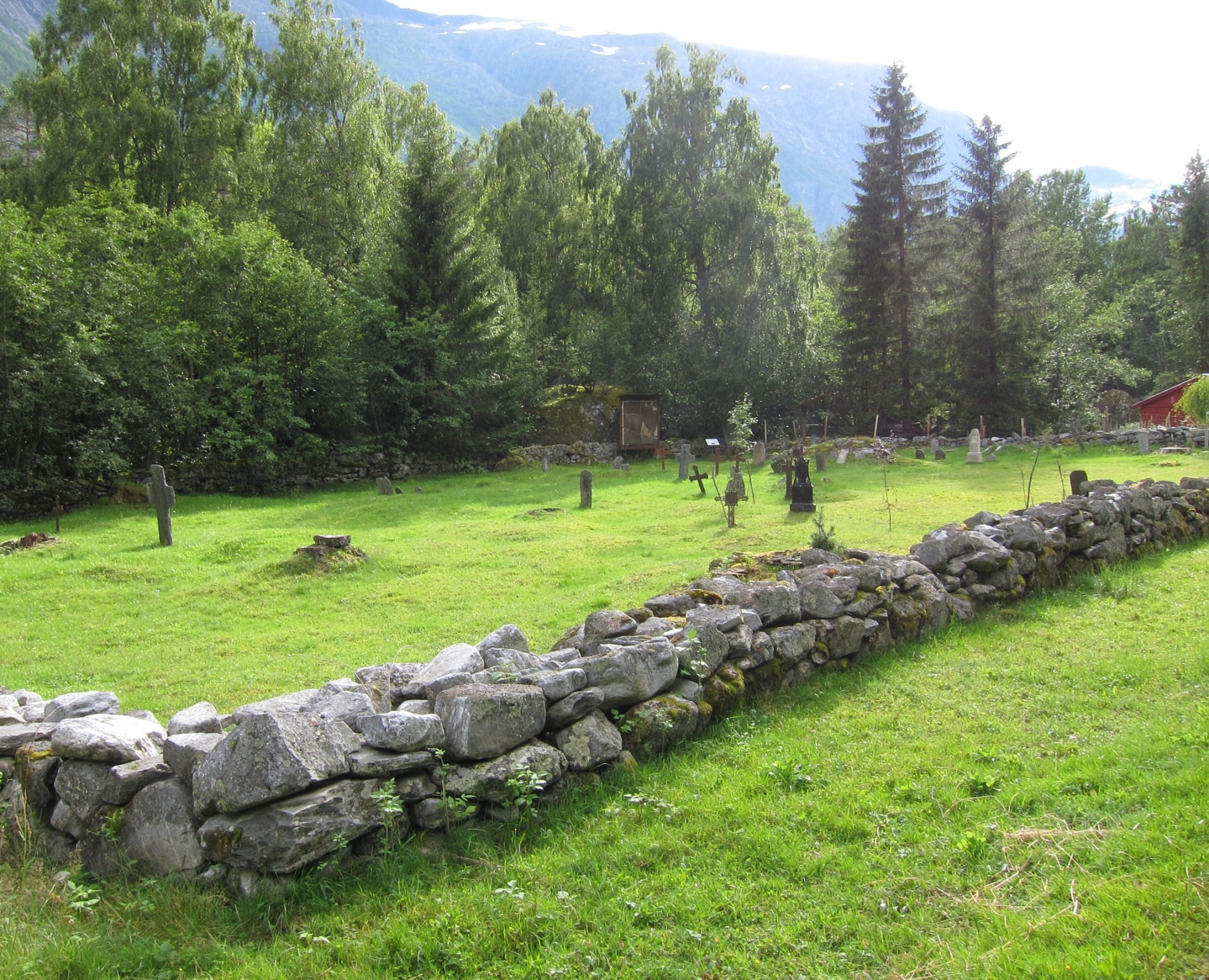
Cemetery that surrounded the old church in the old location

== See also ==
- List of churches in Møre
