= Øverdalen Church =

Church in Møre og Romsdal, Norway

- Øverdalen kyrkje
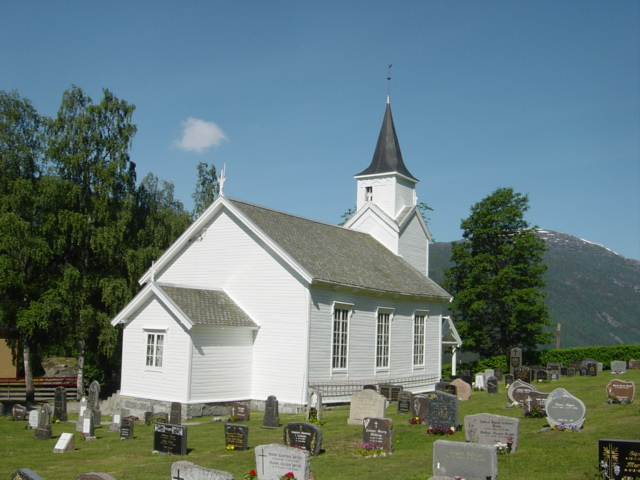
- View of the church
- Øverdalen Church
- 62°20′08″N 8°04′07″E
- Location: Rauma Municipality, Møre og Romsdal
- Country: Norway
- Denomination: Church of Norway
- Churchmanship: Evangelical Lutheran

History
- Former name: Øverdalen kapell
- Status: Parish church
- Founded: 1902
- Consecrated: 9 October 1902

Architecture
- Functional status: Active
- Architect: I.L. Krogseth
- Architectural type: Long church
- Completed: 1902 (124 years ago)

Specifications
- Capacity: 150
- Materials: Wood

Administration
- Diocese: Møre bispedømme
- Deanery: Indre Romsdal prosti
- Parish: Øverdalen
- Norwegian Cultural Heritage Site
- Type: Church
- Status: Not protected
- ID: 85923

Øverdalen Church (Norwegian: Øverdalen kyrkje) is a parish church of the Church of Norway in Rauma Municipality in Møre og Romsdal county, Norway. It is located in the village of Verma in the inner part of the Romsdalen valley. It is the church for the Øverdalen parish which is part of the Indre Romsdal prosti (deanery) in the Diocese of Møre. The white, wooden church was built in a long church design in 1902 using plans drawn up by the architect I.L. Krogseth. The church seats about 150 people.

== History ==
The new Øverdalen Chapel was built after a Royal Decree on 23 March 1901 which split up the old parish for the Romsdalen valley and created this new parish for the southern part and moved the Kors Church farther north to serve the central part of the valley. The new chapel was a relatively simple wooden long church that was built in 1902. It was consecrated on 9 October 1902. The chapel was built by the carpenter Eirik Sylte from Tresfjord Municipality. In 1952–1953, the church interior was renovated under the direction of John Tverdahl. This renovation included lowering the interior ceiling and many new interior furnishings. On 1 January 1997, the church was upgraded to a full parish church and the name was changed from "chapel" to "church".

== See also ==
- List of churches in Møre
