= Staggs =

Staggs is a surname. Notable people with the surname include:

- Barbara Staggs (1940–2014), American educator and politician from Oklahoma
- Erv Staggs (1948–2012), American basketball player
- Jeff Staggs (1944–2014), American football player
- Jimmy Staggs (1935–2007), American disc jockey and record store owner from Illinois
- Kotoni Staggs (born 1998), Australian rugby player
- Monica Staggs (born 1970), American stuntwoman and actress
- Steve Staggs (born 1951), American baseball player
- Suzanne Staggs (born 1965), American physicist and professor
- Thomas O. Staggs (born 1961), American businessman

== See also ==
- Staggs–Huffaker Building, commercial building in Beebe, Arkansas, US
- Stagg, people with a similar surname
- Stag (disambiguation)
