= Vermafossen =

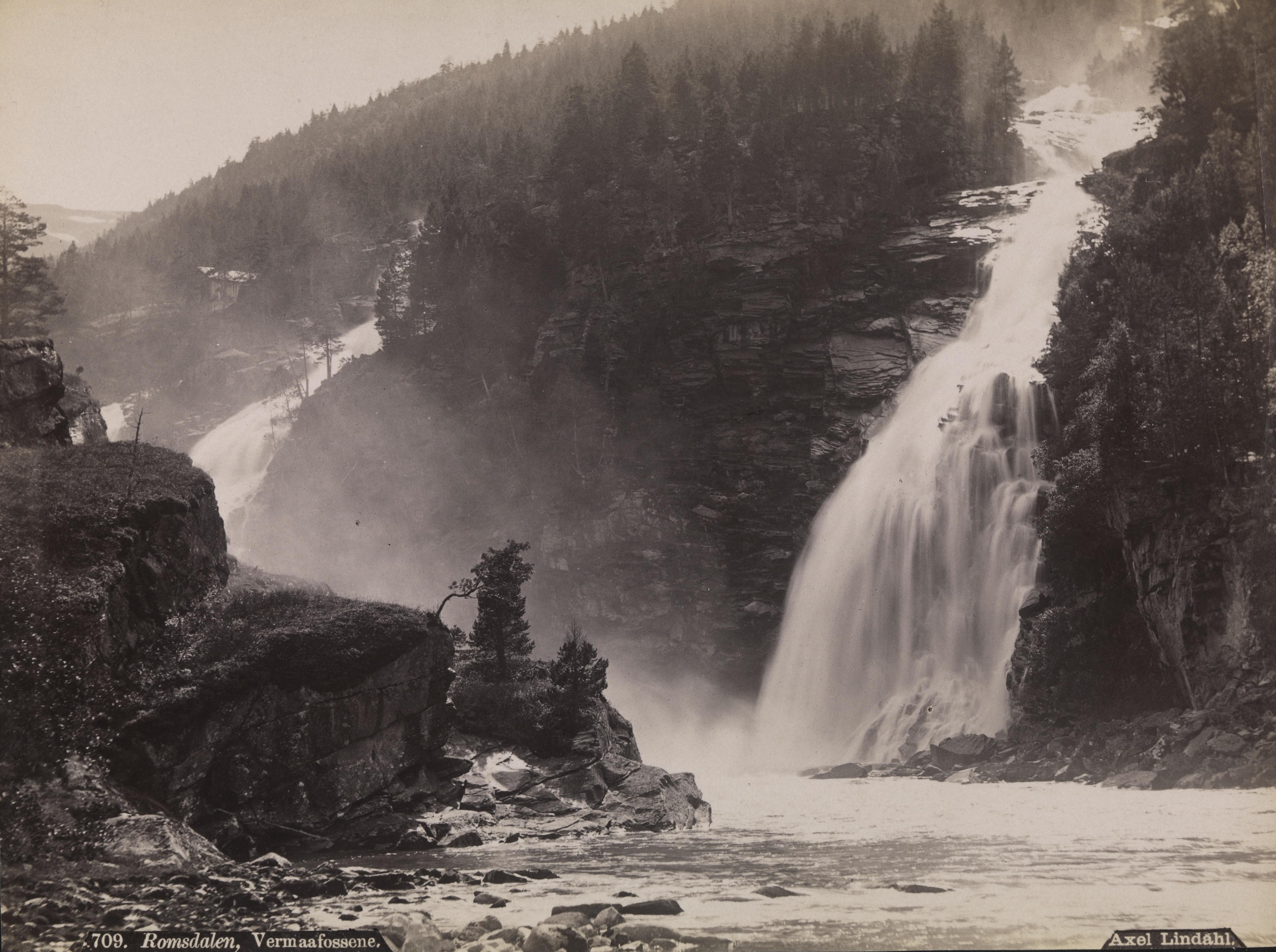
- Credit: Axel Lindahl (1890)
- Interactive map of Vermafossen
- Location: Møre og Romsdal, Norway
- Coordinates: 62.342773°N 8.035205°E
- Type: Segmented Steep Cascade
- Total height: 365 metres (1,198 ft)
- Total width: 137 metres (449 ft)
- Average width: 15 metres (49 ft)
- Run: 975 metres (3,199 ft)
- Watercourse: Rauma
- Average flow rate: 8 cubic metres per second (280 cu ft/s)

Vermafossen or Vermefossen is a waterfall in Rauma Municipality in Møre og Romsdal county, Norway. The waterfall is on the river Verma which is a tributary to the large river Rauma which flows through the Romsdalen valley. The waterfall is near the village of Verma as well as the Rauma railway line and the European route E136.

The river Verma flows in steep cascades, splits in three canals, and finally drops about 50 metres (160 ft) into the main river. The total height is about 380 metres (1,250 ft) along the 1,000 metres (3,300 ft) of the Verma river. In the world waterfall database it is listed as the 242nd tallest in the world. The valley of the Verma river is a typical "hook-valley" (agnordal) as Verma river in prehistory was a tributary to Gudbrandsdalslågen to the east. As the Rauma river gradually dug into the bedrock in upper Romsdalen valley the watershed shifted east and Verma river was captured by Rauma river. Hans Reusch described this peculiarity of the Scandinavian divide in 1905. The hook-valley phenomenon is particularly visible around the Romsdalen/Eikesdalen and northern Gudbrandsdalen.

The flow of the Verma river is regulated by dams and used at the Verma power station (originally built in 1923, expanded in 1953). The dam is about 420 metres (1,380 ft) above the power station. About 70 gigawatt-hours (250 TJ) are produced annually.

The Rauma Line runs on a 26-metre (85 ft) long bridge (constructed 1918–1923) across the lower part of the waterfall.

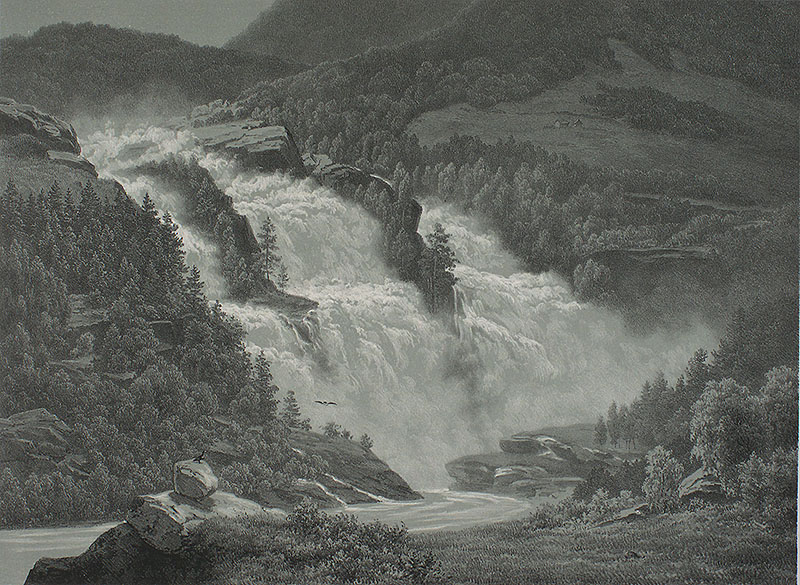
Drawing published 1848 in Norge fremstillet i Tegninger

== See also ==
- List of waterfalls
