= Kylling Bridge =

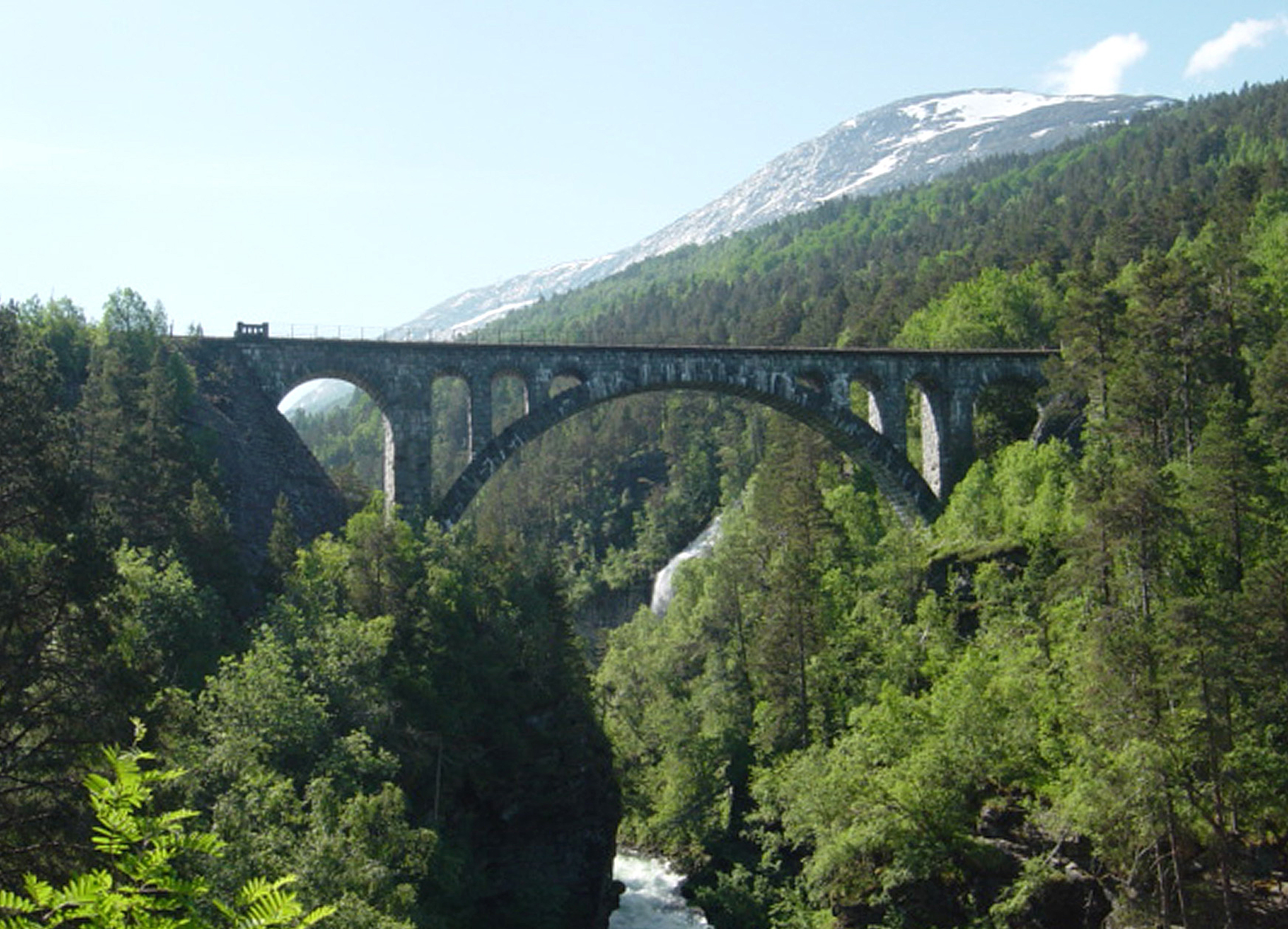
- Coordinates: 62°20′17″N 8°3′39″E
- Carries: Rauma Line
- Crosses: Rauma
- Locale: Verma
- Official name: Kylling bru
- Maintained by: Norwegian National Rail Administration

Characteristics
- Total length: 76 m (249 ft)
- Longest span: 42 m (138 ft)
- Clearance below: 59.3 m (195 ft)

History
- Construction end: 1921
- Opened: 29 November 1924

Location
- Interactive map of Kylling Bridge

The Kylling Bridge (Norwegian: Kylling bru) is a railway bridge in Rauma Municipality in Møre og Romsdal county, Norway. The bridge crosses the Rauma River near the village of Verma in the upper part of the Romsdalen valley. The bridge is part of a double horseshoe curve that allows the railway to pass a narrow and steep section of the valley. It is one of the most photographed railway bridges in Norway. The Kylling Bridge is 76 metres (249 ft) long. The main span is 42 metres (138 ft), and side spans are 10 metres (33 ft) and 8 metres (26 ft). The clearance to the river below is 59.3 metres (195 ft).

The construction of the Kylling Bridge started in September 1913. After almost 9 years, the bridge was finally finished in the winter of 1921. The Rauma Line railway opened on 29 November 1924. The Kylling Bridge cost 676,000 kr.

== Name ==
Often mistranslated as "the Chicken Bridge", the name actually derives from the Kylling farm on whose ground the bridge was built. The name Kylling, incidentally homonymous with the modern Norwegian word for chicken, is really an Old Norse name meaning a small hill, indicating the farm stood on a small hill compared to the surrounding terrain.
