= Romsdalshornet =

Mountain in Møre og Romsdal, Norway

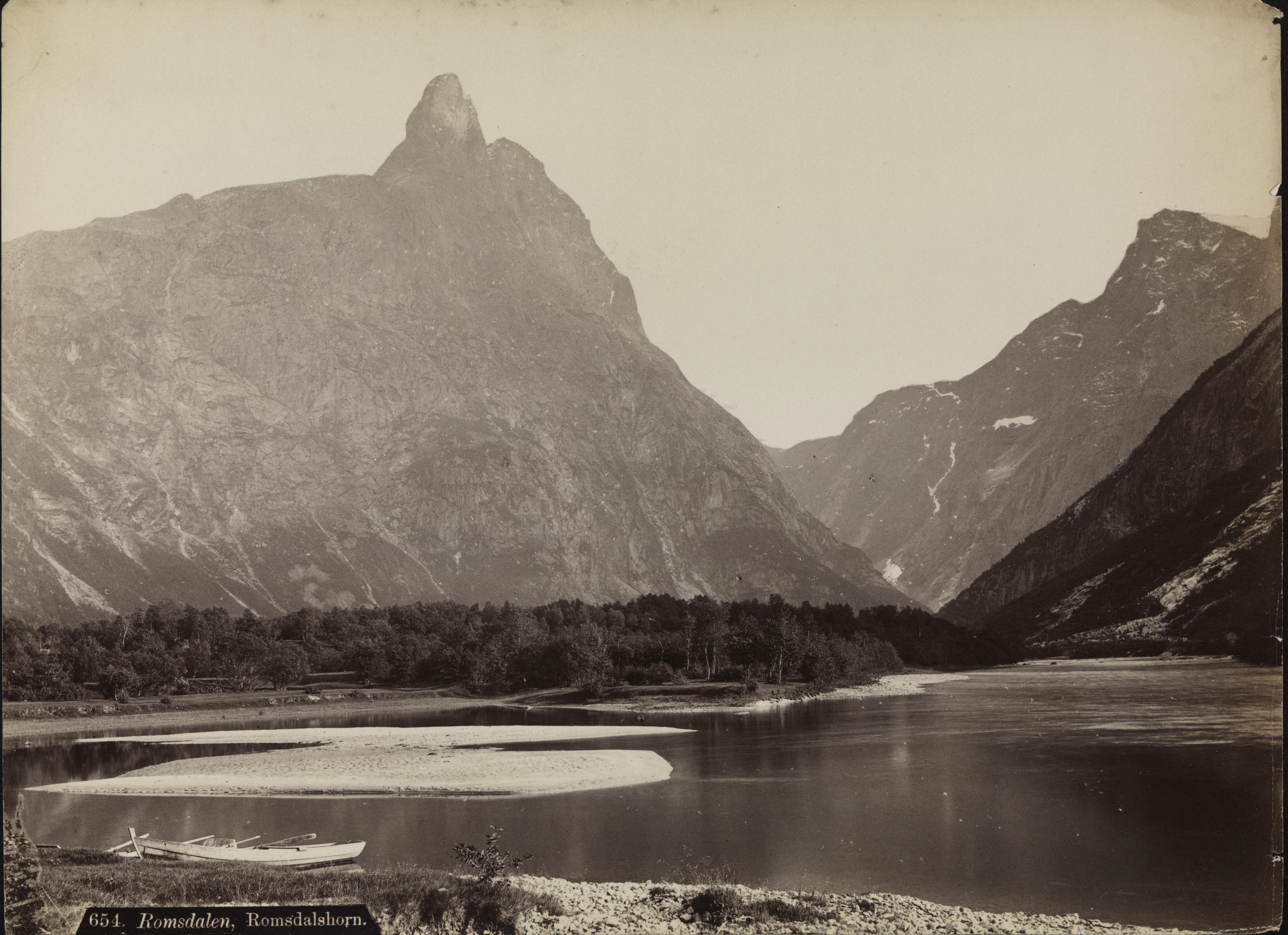
- Romsdalshornet seen from the valley Credit: Axel Lindahl, 1890

Highest point
- Elevation: 1,550 m (5,090 ft)
- Prominence: 420 m (1,380 ft)
- Parent peak: Kleneggen
- Isolation: 2.7 km (1.7 mi)
- Coordinates: 62.4913°N 7.7859°E

Geography
- Interactive map of the mountain
- Location: Møre og Romsdal, Norway
- Parent range: Romsdalsalpane
- Topo map: 1319 II Romsdalen

Climbing
- First ascent: c. 1828 by Christen Smed & Hans Bjermeland
- Easiest route: Climbing

Romsdalshornet is a mountain in Rauma Municipality in Møre og Romsdal county, Norway. The mountain is located 10 kilometres (6.2 mi) southeast of the town of Åndalsnes, along the Rauma River in the Romsdalen valley.

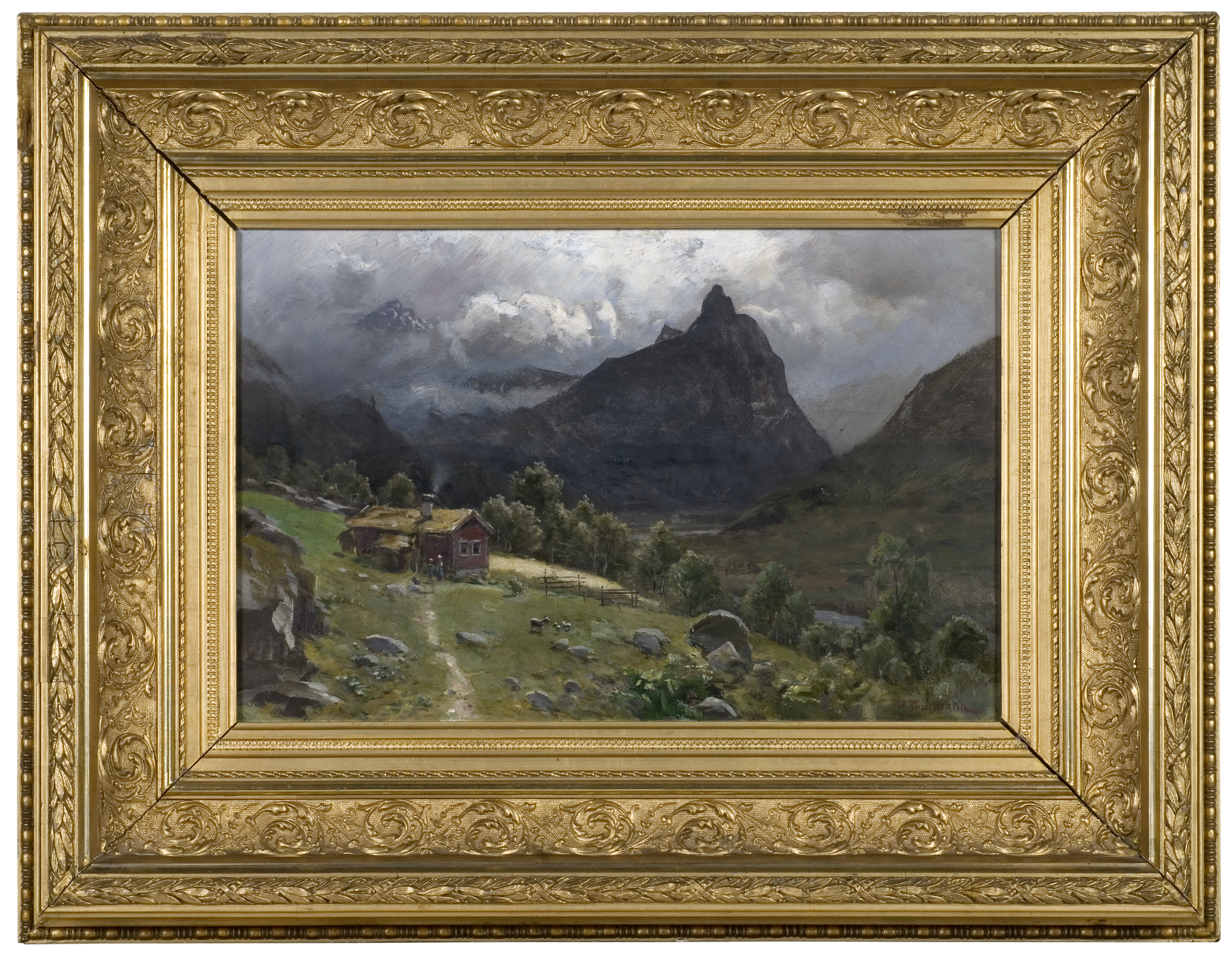
«Landskap» (Landscape) by Peder Cappelen Thurmann, Nationalmuseum, Stockholm.

The Rauma railway line and the European route E136 highway both pass by the mountain. The mountain Store Venjetinden lies 3 kilometres (1.9 mi) east of the mountain and 3 kilometres (1.9 mi) to the west (across the valley) lies the mountain Store Trolltinden—part of the Troll Wall/Trollryggen ridge.

Romsdalshornet is a popular mountain for climbing, which is best done in late summer. Descent by rappel is recommended.

== History ==
The first "official" ascent was 1 September 1881 by the Danish climber Carl Hall, together with Norwegians Erik Norahagen and Mathias Soggemoen. They arrived only to discover a cairn set up by Christen Smed and Hans Bjermeland around 1828. Previously none believed Romsdalshornet had been summited.

Arne Randers Heen made the first winter ascent of Romsdalshorn in 1930.

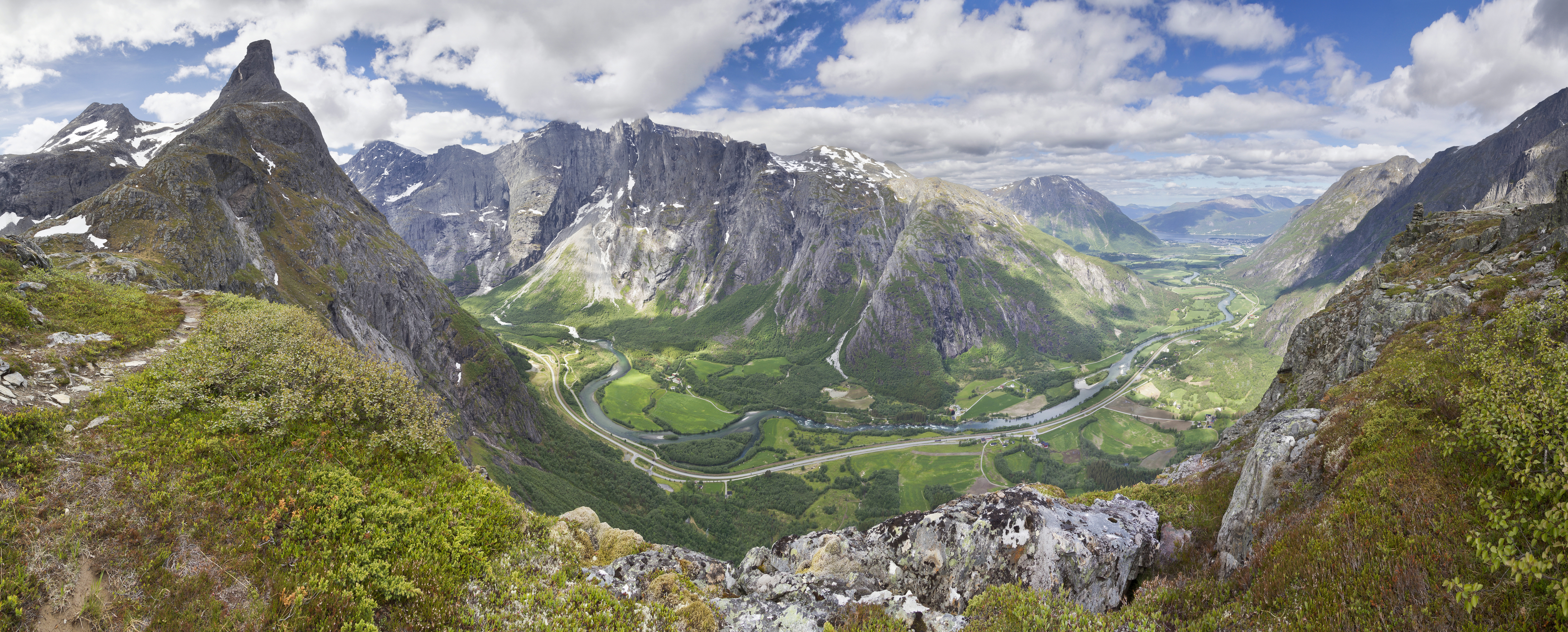
Romsdalshornet at Romsdalen valley and Åndalsnes town (right hand)

== See also ==
- List of mountains of Norway
