= Lesjaskogsvatnet =

Lake in Innlandet, Norway

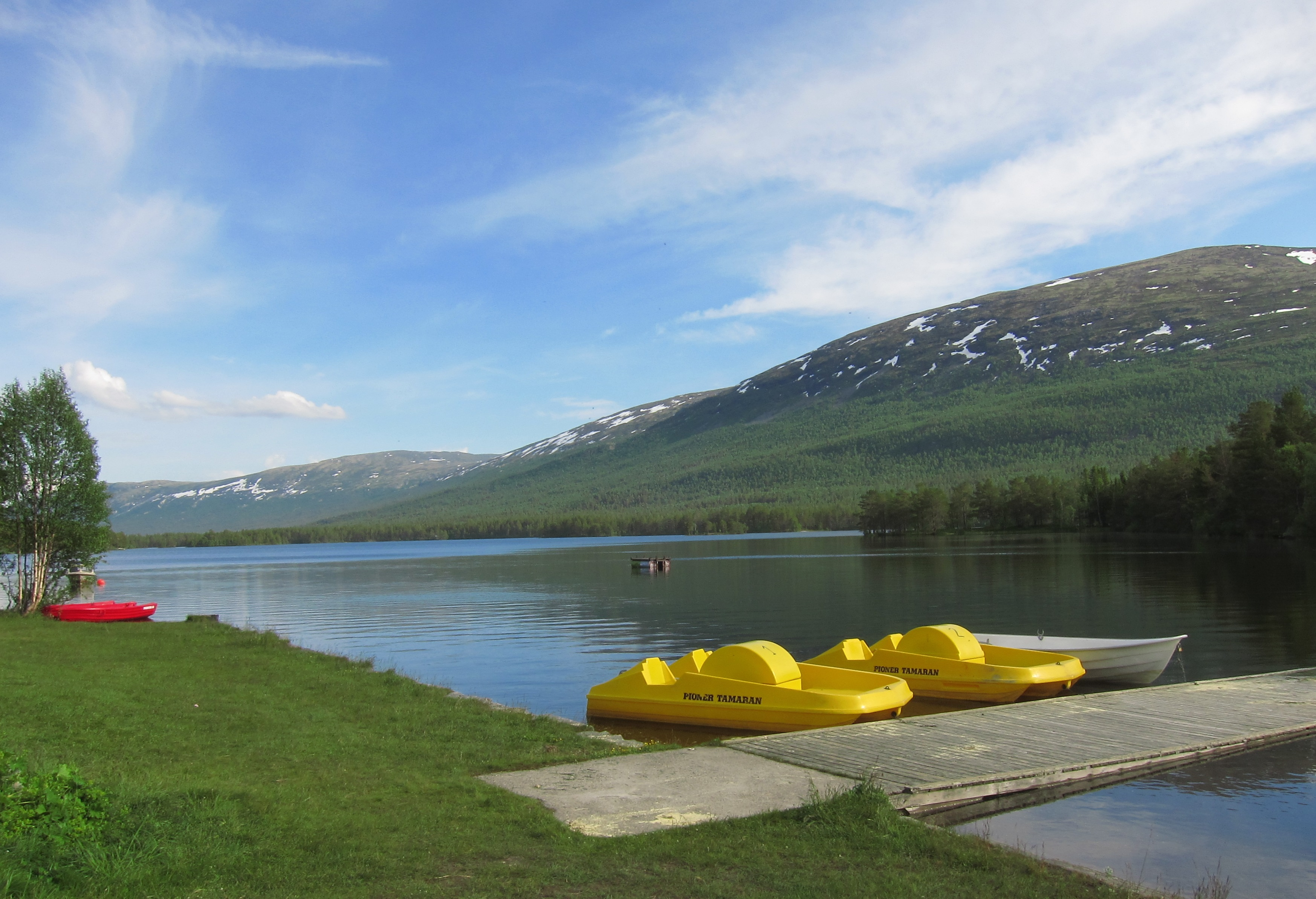
- View of the northwestern part of the lake
- Interactive map of the lake
- Location: Lesja Municipality, Innlandet
- Coordinates: 62°14′N 8°25′E
- Type: Natural lake; reservoir
- Primary outflows: Gudbrandsdalslågen, Rauma
- Catchment area: 45.65 km^{2} (17.63 sq mi)
- Basin countries: Norway
- Max. length: 10 kilometres (6.2 mi)
- Max. width: 1 kilometre (0.62 mi)
- Surface area: 4.3362 km^{2} (1.6742 sq mi)
- Surface elevation: 611 metres (2,005 ft)
- Settlements: Lesjaverk, Lesjaskog
- References: NVE

Lesjaskogsvatnet (lit. 'the Lesjaskog lake') is a lake in Lesja Municipality in Innlandet county, Norway. The 4.3-square-kilometre (1.7 sq mi) lake lies in the upper Gudbrandsdalen valley, between the villages of Lesjaskog (on the west end) and Lesjaverk (on the east end). The European route E136 highway and the Raumabanen railway line both run along the north side of the lake.

The lake is unusual by having two outlets, one in each end. It flows east into the Gudbrandsdalslågen river and it also flows out to the west into the Rauma river in the Romsdalen valley. This bifurcation lake serves as the headwaters for two major rivers: Gudbrandsdalslågen (flowing south/east) and for Rauma river (flowing west). Gudbrandsdalslågen (also known as Lågen) flows through the Gudbrandsdalen valley, ending when it flows into the lake Mjøsa. The lake sits on the watershed in the north-western corner of Glomma drainage system that includes large parts of eastern Norway.

The lake was dammed to serve the Lesja Iron Works in the 1660s. The dam raised the water level on the east end of the lake by 3 metres (9.8 ft). The west end of the lake that flows into the Rauma was raised a little when a small stone wall was built. Before the dam was built, the lake was shorter and concentrated in what is now the west end of the lake. About 67% of the water flows to the river Rauma and when the water level is low, nearly 80% of the lake flows to the Rauma river. Rotting plants and fish on the bottom produces gas that in winter is captured under the ice. The watershed has over thousands of years shifted east because rivers and glaciers to west dig more into the bedrock, notably in the upper part of Rauma river near the village of Verma.

== Norwegian campaign 1940 ==
No. 263 Squadron RAF operated with 18 Gloster Gladiator biplane fighters from a landing strip on the frozen Lesjaskogsvatnet in late April 1940 as part of the Norwegian campaign.

The British air force chose Lesjaskogsvatnet because of the relatively short distance to the front line in the Gudbrandsdalen Valley as well as proximity to the British base at Åndalsnes. The British also planned to bring in large amounts of explosives from Scotland to blow up the railway tunnels at Dombås (this would block railway connections to Åndalsnes and Trondheim), but the German forces advanced too fast. The ice was covered by at least 40 centimetres (16 in) of snow and a few hundred locals cleared a 750-metre (2,460 ft) long and 70-metre (230 ft) wide runway. Snow clearing began on 20 April and the same day Norwegian Fokker C.V surveillance planes landed with skis. The workers on the ice were attacked by German fighter planes, and most snow clearing was then done during night. Some 100 ground crew arrived on 23 April. The runway was used on 24 and 18 April planes completed about 40 flights and attacked 37 enemy planes. That same night was extremely cold and engines did not start. Early morning 25 April the makeshift airfield was attacked by Heinkel He 111s and Junkers Ju 88s. Two British plane that were unharmed but unable to fly were burned by the crew. At the end only five planes survived and were moved to Setnesmoen camp at Veblungsnes on 26 April.

== Media gallery ==
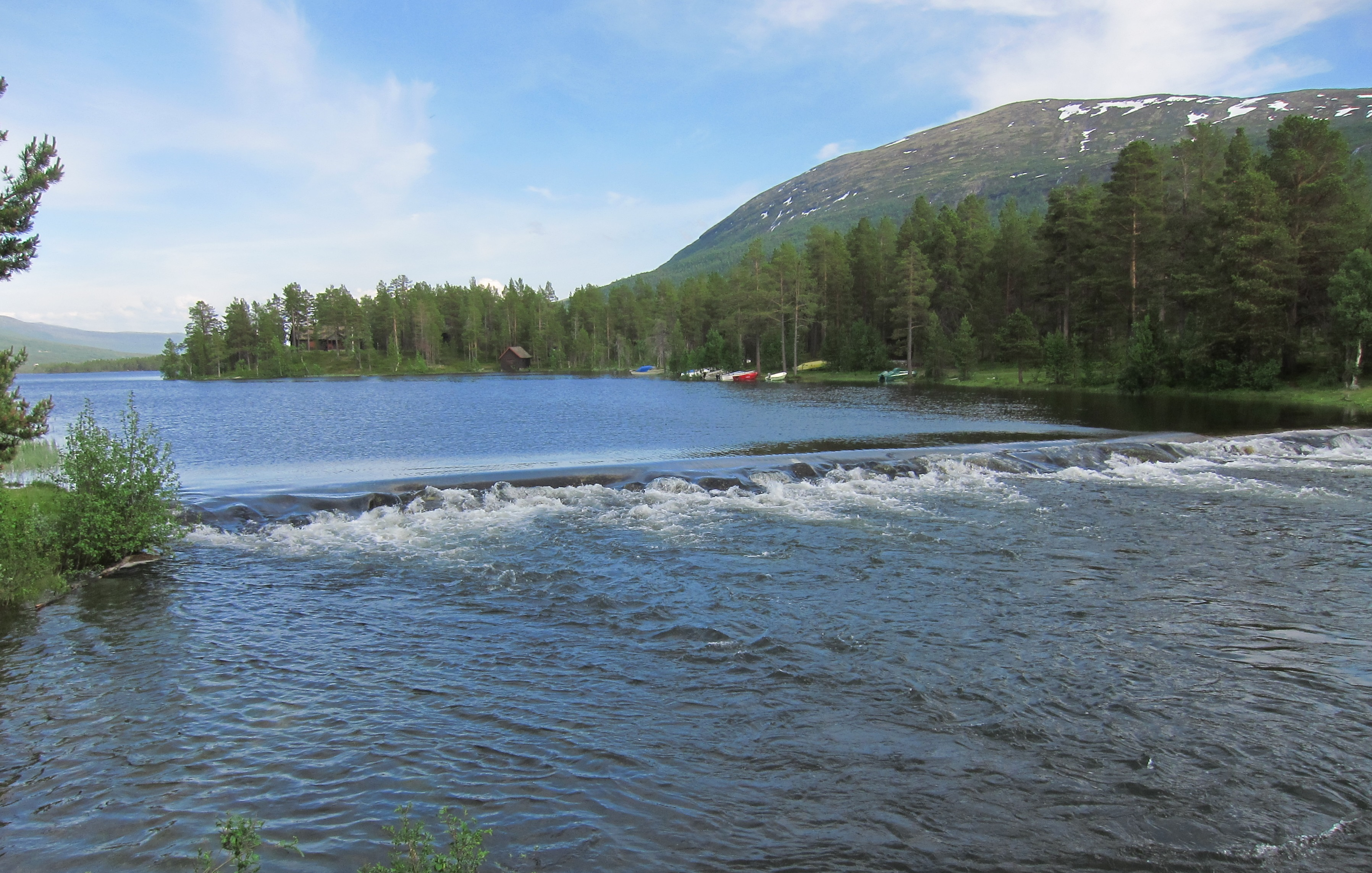
Outflow to Rauma and dam

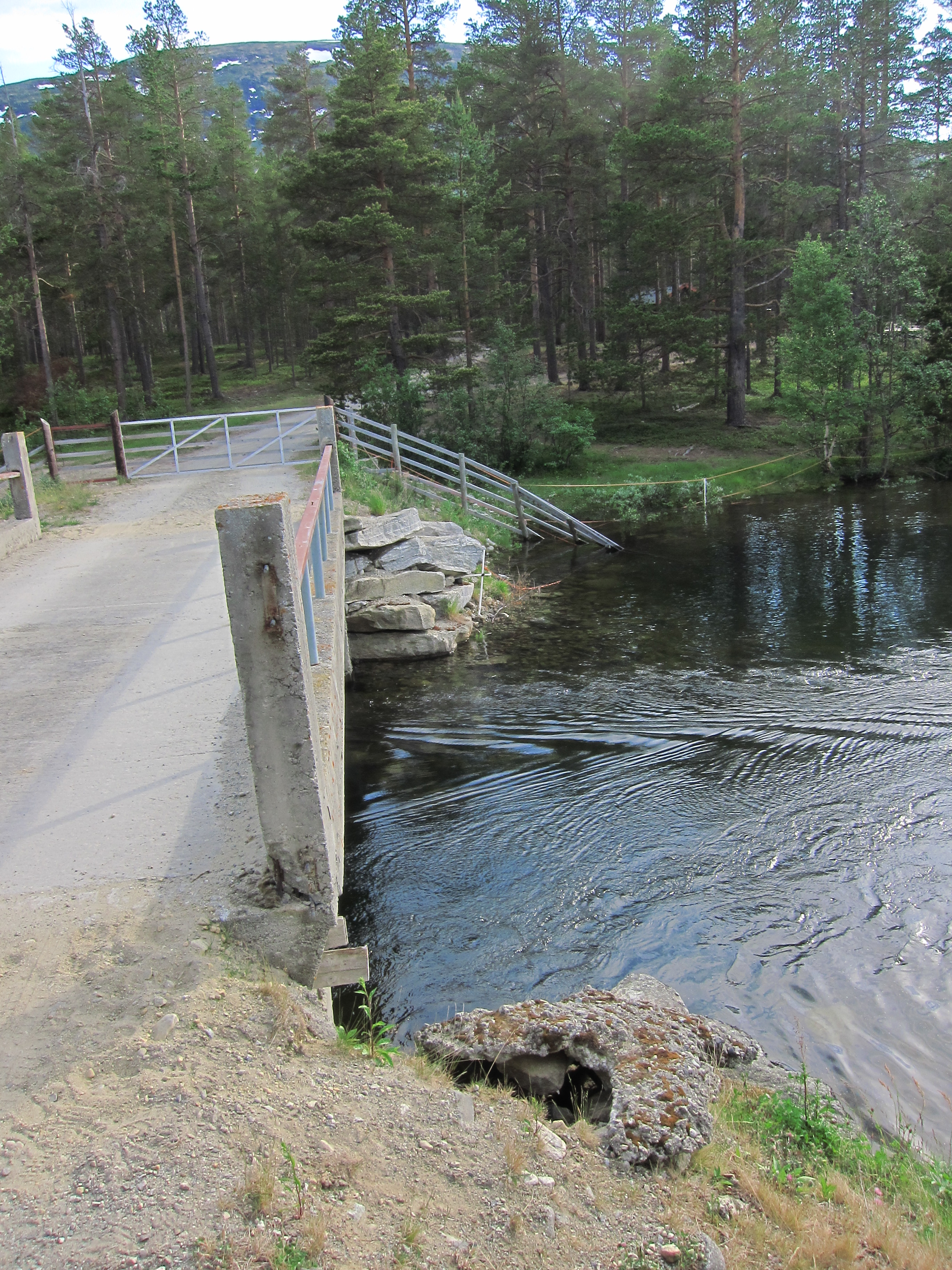
Bridge at Bryggeosen, outflow from eastern to western part of the lake

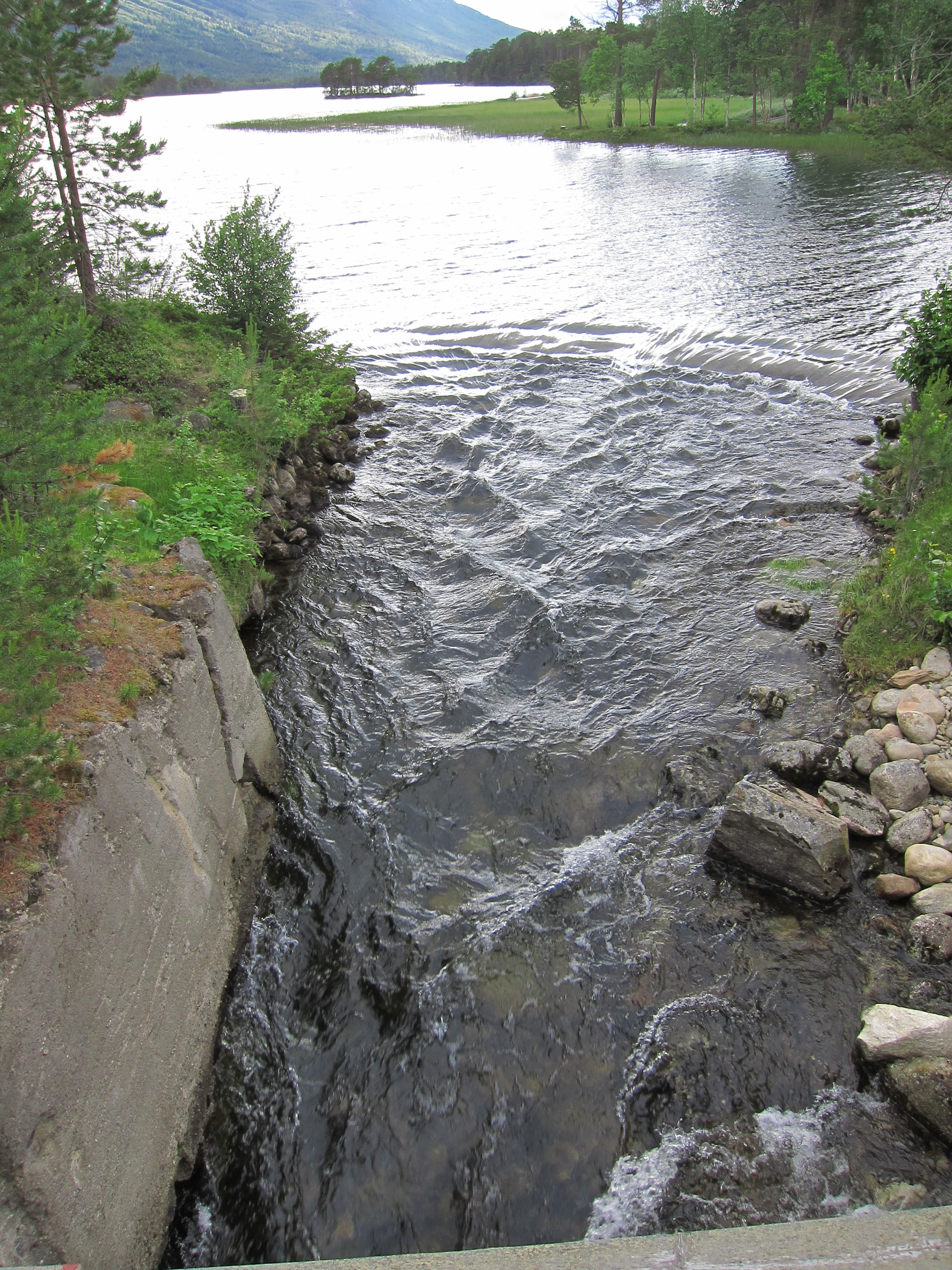
Lågen outflow at Lesjaverk

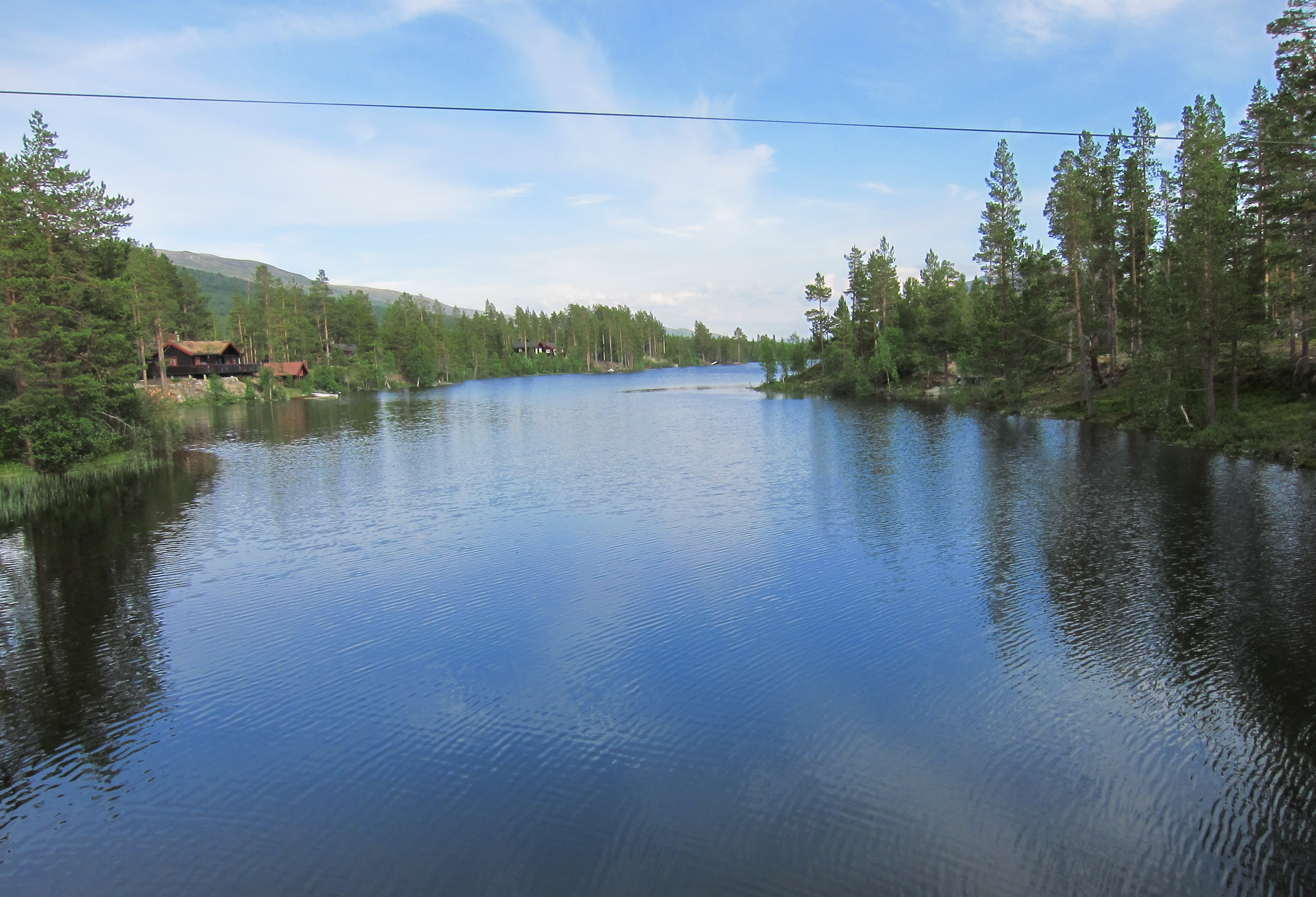
Eastern part at Bryggeosen

== See also ==
- List of lakes of Norway
