= Verma, Møre og Romsdal =

Village in Rauma Municipality, Norway

Verma
- Village
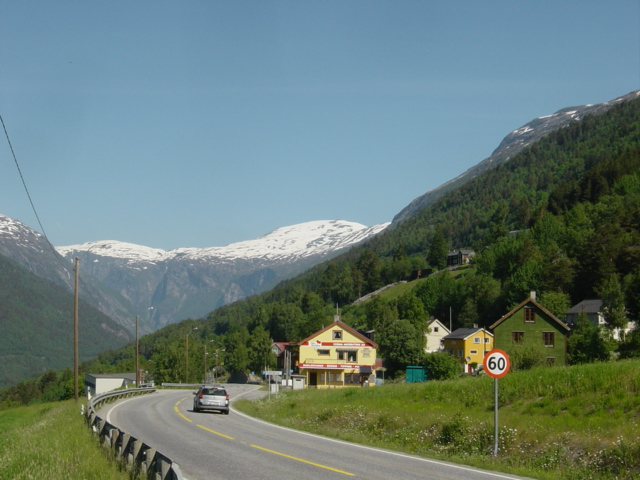
- View from Verma
- Interactive map of Verma
- Location within Møre og Romsdal Location within Norway
- Coordinates: 62.3433°N 8.0589°E
- Country: Norway
- Region: Western Norway
- County: Møre og Romsdal
- District: Romsdal
- Municipality: Rauma Municipality
- Elevation: 290 m (950 ft)
- Time zone: UTC+01:00 (CET)
  - Summer (DST): UTC+02:00 (CEST)
- Post Code: 6330 Verma

Verma is a village in Rauma Municipality in Møre og Romsdal county, Norway. It is located along the European route E136 highway deep in the Romsdalen valley. The village lies along the Rauma Line, where the Kylling Bridge crosses the Rauma River. The village is named after the local river Verma which empties into the main river Rauma.

The Øverdalen Church is located in Verma. The village of Bjorli is located 11 kilometres (6.8 mi) to the south in Lesja Municipality.
