= Frank Stagg =

Frank Stagg may refer to:

- Frank Stagg (Irish republican) (1941–1976), Irish republican and hunger striker
- Frank Stagg (theologian) (1911–2001), U.S. Southern Baptist theologian and author
- Frank Noel Stagg (1884–1956), Royal Navy officer
