= Istra (Rauma) =

Coordinates: 62.5379°N 7.6922°E

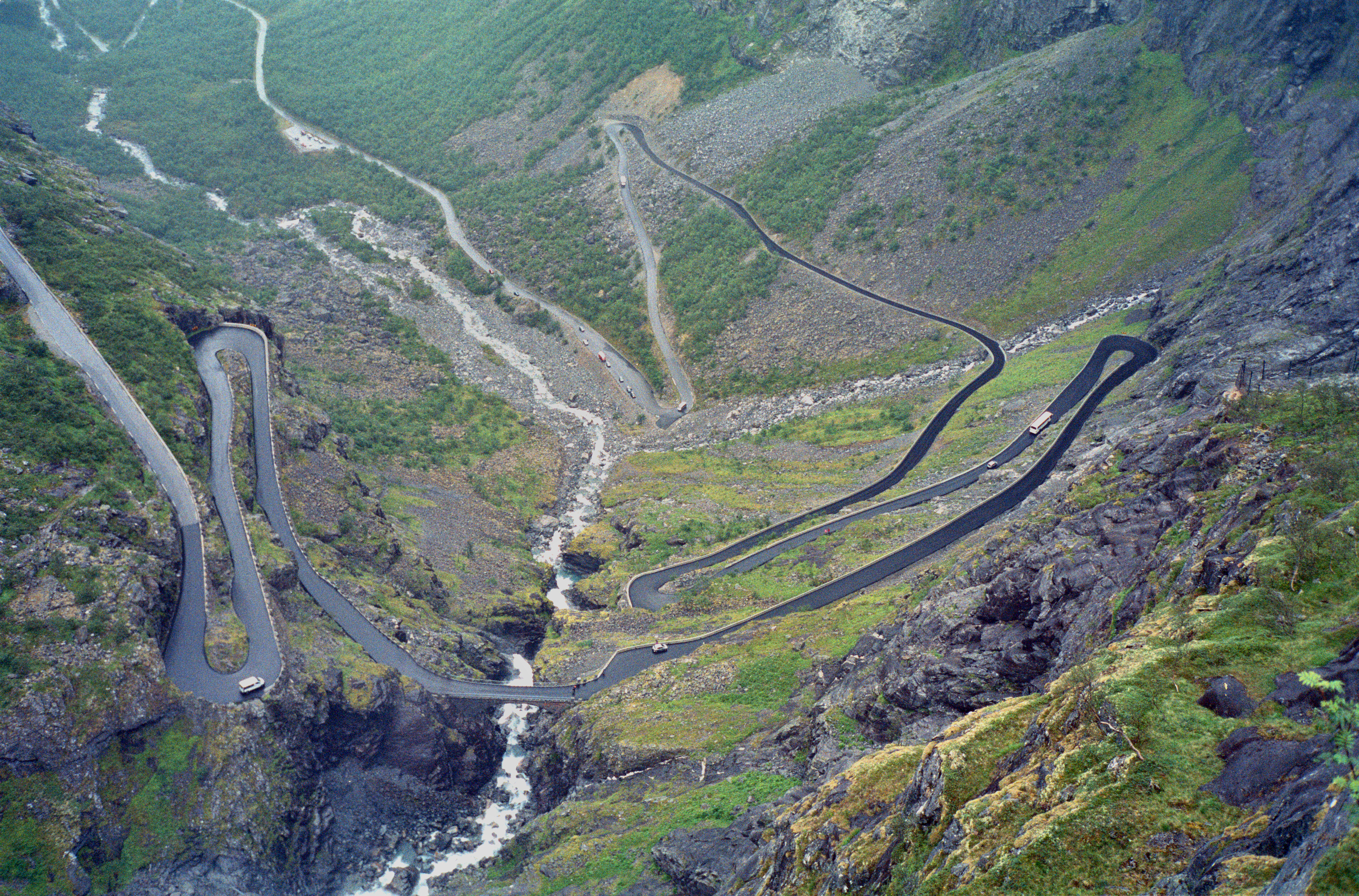
- View of the river

Location
- Country: Norway

Physical characteristics
- Source
  - location: Reinheimen National Park
- Mouth
  - location: Rauma
- Length: 17 km (11 mi)
- Basin size: 66 km^{2} (25 sq mi)

Basin features
- River system: Rauma

The Istra is a river in Rauma Municipality in Møre og Romsdal county, Norway. The river runs through the Isterdalen valley before emptying into the Rauma river in the Romsdalen valley. It discharges into the Rauma about 3 kilometres (1.9 mi) south of the town of Åndalsnes. The 17-kilometre (11 mi) long river Istra has a basin area of 66 square kilometres (25 sq mi). The river has its source inside Reinheimen National Park.

The river Istra has a 10-kilometre (6.2 mi) long stretch that has excellent salmon fishing. The river was protected in the Conservation Plan III and later in the Conservation Plan IV. The Norwegian County Road 63 and the famous Trollstigen road both follow the river.
