= Charlotte Stagg =

British neurophysiologist

- Education: University of Bristol; University of Oxford
- Scientific career
- Workplaces: University of Oxford
- Thesis: Modulation of motor cortical plasticity by transcranial stimulation. (2008)

Charlotte Stagg is a British neurophysiologist who is a professor at the University of Oxford. She leads the Physiological Neuroimaging Group.

== Early life and education ==
Stagg studied physiology and medicine at the University of Bristol, graduating with pre-clinical and clinical honours and the Physiological Society prize. For her doctoral degree, she moved to the University of Oxford and worked at the Oxford Centre for Functional Magnetic Resonance Imaging (MRI) of the Brain (FMRIB) under the supervision of Paul Matthews and Heidi Johansen-Berg. During her DPhil, she looked to understand how people acquire new motor skills. She joined the Neuroplasticity group for her first postdoctoral position. In 2010 she moved to the Sobell Department of Motor Neuroscience and Movement Disorders, where she worked with John Rothwell for half a year, before joining Andrew Maudsley at the University of Miami. There she became interested in in vivo magnetic resonance spectroscopy.

== Research and career ==
After returning from Miami, Stagg started a GlaxoSmithKline Junior Research Fellowship at St Edmund Hall, Oxford. She returned to the FMRIB, where she worked with Heidi Johansen-Berg. In 2014 Stagg was awarded a Sir Henry Dale Fellowship by the Wellcome Trust and the Royal Society. Her research is focused on the neurophysiological processes associated with learning motor skills. Her early work looked to understand why particular people struggled with dance and piano lessons. In a clinical study Stagg taught volunteers a sequence of finger motions and monitored the levels of γ-aminobutyric acid (GABA), the brain's main inhibitory neurotransmitter. She showed that in people who quickly learned the finger motions, the levels of GABA fell quickly, which allowed neurons to create new circuitry.

Stagg demonstrated that ipsilesional anodal transcranial direct-current stimulation (tDCS) can support patients in recovery after stroke. In this form of tDCS, a positive current is applied to the damaged area of the brain. They used MRI scans to better understand brain activity before and after the tDCS, and showed that the stimulated regions were more active in the regions relevant to motor skills. Stagg has worked on magnetic resonance spectroscopy as a means to understand neuronal activity in vivo, through the measurement of glutamate and GABA.

Stagg was promoted to Professor of Human Neurophysiology in 2018.

== Awards and honours ==
- 2015 elected to AcademiaNet
- 2017 British Neuroscience Association Sieratzki UK-Israel Early Career Prize

== Selected publications ==
- Stagg, Charlotte J.; Nitsche, Michael A. (2011). "Physiological Basis of Transcranial Direct Current Stimulation". The Neuroscientist. 17 (1): 37–53. doi:10.1177/1073858410386614. ISSN 1073-8584. PMID 21343407. S2CID 29018263.
- Stagg, Charlotte J.; Best, Jonathan G.; Stephenson, Mary C.; O'Shea, Jacinta; Wylezinska, Marzena; Kincses, Z. Tamas; Morris, Peter G.; Matthews, Paul M.; Johansen-Berg, Heidi (2009-04-22). "Polarity-Sensitive Modulation of Cortical Neurotransmitters by Transcranial Stimulation". Journal of Neuroscience. 29 (16): 5202–5206. doi:10.1523/JNEUROSCI.4432-08.2009. ISSN 0270-6474. PMC 6665468. PMID 19386916.
- Stagg, Charlotte; Bachtiar, Velicia; Johansen-Berg, Heidi (2011-03-22). "The Role of GABA in Human Motor Learning". Current Biology. 21 (6): 480–484. doi:10.1016/j.cub.2011.01.069. ISSN 0960-9822. PMC 3063350. PMID 21376596.
- Magnetic resonance spectroscopy : tools for neuroscience research and emerging clinical applications. Stagg, Charlotte., Rothman, D. L. (Douglas L.). Amsterdam: Academic Press. 2013. ISBN 978-0-12-401697-2. OCLC 865647250.
