= Marstein =

Marstein is a surname.

== People ==
- Marstein (rapper) (born 2002), Norwegian rapper
- Nils Marstein (born 1950), Norwegian civil servant
- Trude Marstein (born 1973), Norwegian author

== See also ==
- Marsteinen
- Marsteinen Nunatak
- Marsteinen (newspaper)
