= Stag (disambiguation) =

A stag is an adult male deer.

Stag, Stags or STAG may also refer to:

== Arts and entertainment ==
- Stag (Amy Ray album) (2001)
- Stag (Melvins album) (1996)
- Danny Stag, stage name of American hard rock guitarist Daniel Steigerwald
- Stag (film), a 1997 film starring John Stockwell
- The Stag (film), a 2013 Irish film
- Stag (TV series), a 2016 television series
- Special Tactical Anti-Gang, a unit in the video game Saints Row: The Third
- Stags (TV series), an upcoming television series

== Sports ==
- Mansfield Town F.C., nicknamed the Stags, an English football club
- Hemel Stags, an English rugby league club
- Chicago Stags, a National Basketball Association team from 1946 to 1950
- Michigan Stags, a World Hockey Association team in the 1974-1975 season
- Fairfield Stags, the athletics programs of Fairfield University, Connecticut, United States
- Belleville Stags, (1947–1949), a Class D minor league baseball team based in Belleville, Illinois
- Central Stags or Central Districts cricket team, a New Zealand first class cricket team
- San Sebastian Stags, the varsity teams of San Sebastian College – Recoletos of Manila

== Transportation ==
- HMS Stag, various Royal Navy ships
- USS Stag, an American World War II water distilling ship
- Stag (barque), a Nova Scotian clipper ship, built in 1854
- Triumph Stag, a British car
- South Devon Railway Leopard class, a 4-4-0ST steam locomotive

== Places ==
- Stag Island (Ontario), Ontario, Canada
- Stag Island (Nunavut), Canada
- Houvenkopf Mountain, also known as Stag Hill, New Jersey, United States

== Other uses ==
- Stag or bachelor party, held for a man who is soon to be married
- Stag (magazine), various American men's magazines
- The Stag (magazine), a monthly student magazine of the University of Surrey
- South Trafford Archaeological Group, in the UK
- St Albans Girls' School, England
- St Andrew the Great, a Church of England parish church in central Cambridge, England
- Stag Arms, a firearms manufacturer in New Britain, Connecticut
- Stag Beer, a brand of beer

== See also ==
- Stag beetle, an insect with "stag horns"
- Stag film, a pornographic movie
- Stag hunt, in game theory
- Stag-moose, an extinct species
- Stag PDX, a nightclub and strip club in Portland, Oregon
- Stagg (disambiguation)
