= Rauma (river) =

River in Central Norway

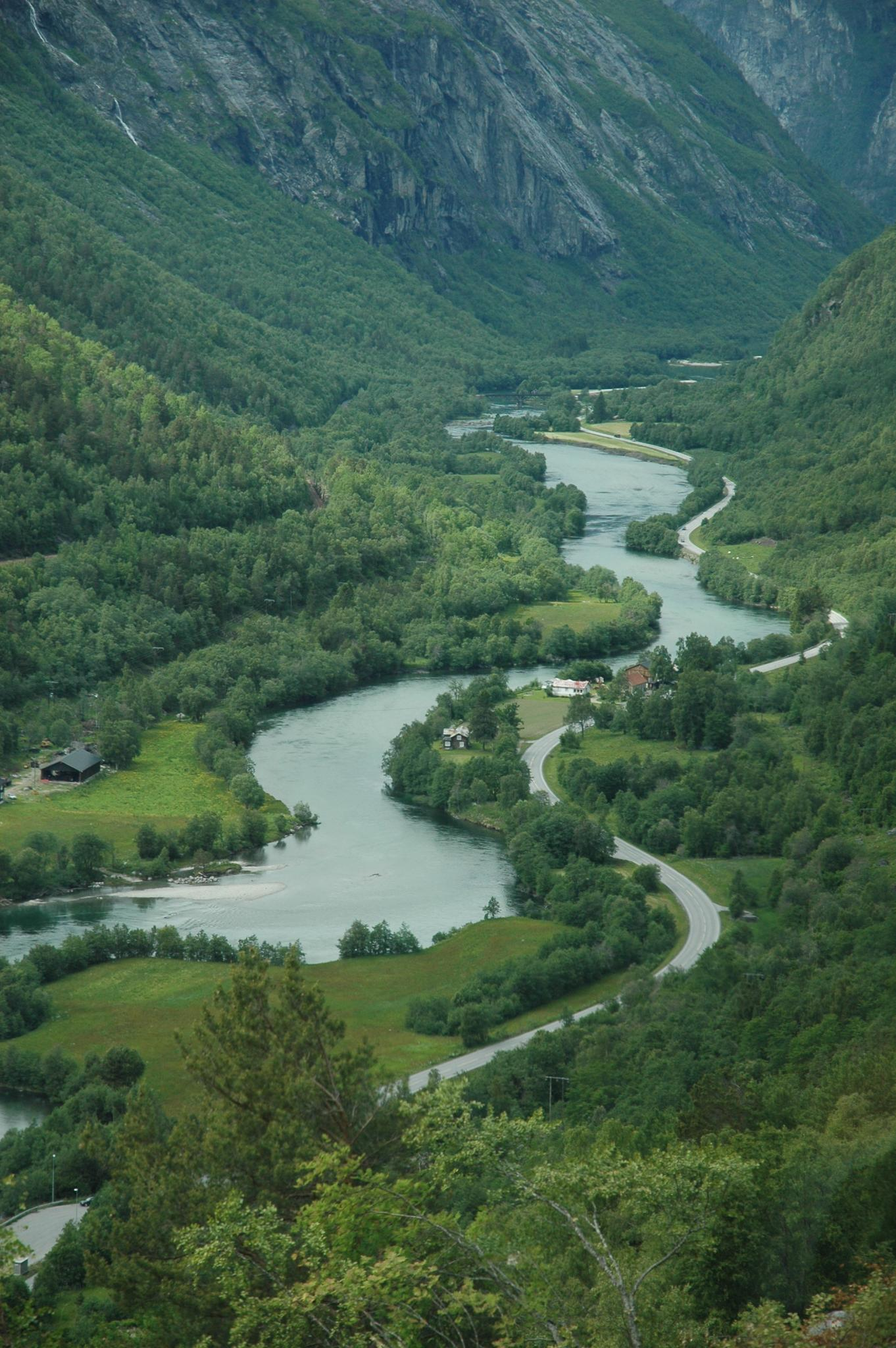

Location
- Country: Norway
- County: Møre og Romsdal, Innlandet
- Municipalities: Rauma Municipality, Lesja Municipality

Physical characteristics
- Source: Lesjaskogsvatnet
  - location: Lesja Municipality
  - coordinates: 62.22835°N 8.367183°E
  - elevation: 611 metres (2,005 ft)
- Mouth: Romsdalsfjorden
  - location: Åndalsnes, Rauma Municipality
  - coordinates: 62.55715°N 7.67759°E
  - elevation: 0 metres (0 ft)
- Length: 68 km (42 mi)
- Basin size: 1,202 km^{2} (464 sq mi)

The Rauma is a river that runs through the Romsdalen valley in Møre og Romsdal and Innlandet counties in Norway. It runs for 68 kilometres (42 mi) from the lake Lesjaskogsvatnet in Lesja Municipality (in Innlandet county), through the valley all the way to the town of Åndalsnes in Rauma Municipality (in Møre og Romsdal county) where it empties into the Romsdalsfjorden. The river was once famous for its salmon-fishing, but since an infection with Gyrodactylus salaris only 5 to 10% of the original stock survives. This, however, has begun to recover rapidly after a successful revitalisation project. The salmon runs up to the Slettafossen, a 16-metre (52 ft) high combination of waterfalls and rapids more than 42 kilometres (26 mi) upriver from the estuary.

The Rauma River and its valley are regarded as one of the most beautiful in Norway. The river runs very clear with a green tint and the mountains tower some 1,500 to 1,800 metres (4,900 to 5,900 ft) above the river in the lower and middle parts of the valley. The Reinheimen National Park and the Trollveggen cliff are both located along the southwestern shores of the river through the municipality of Rauma. The Romsdalsalpene mountains surround the river and the valley, including the mountains Store Trolltinden, Store Venjetinden, Trollryggen, and Romsdalshornet. The Rauma Line railroad follows the river through the valley on its way north to Åndalsnes. The railroad crosses the river on the Kylling Bridge at the village of Verma.

The Rauma was classified as a protected watercourse in 1992, and the only main tributary affected by hydroelectric power is the Verma River with the over 300-metre (980 ft) Vermafossen falls. The biggest tributaries are the Ulvåa and Istra. The Istra runs through the Ister Valley, well known for Trollstigen Road in its upper parts.

The origins of the name Rauma are unknown.

== Media gallery ==
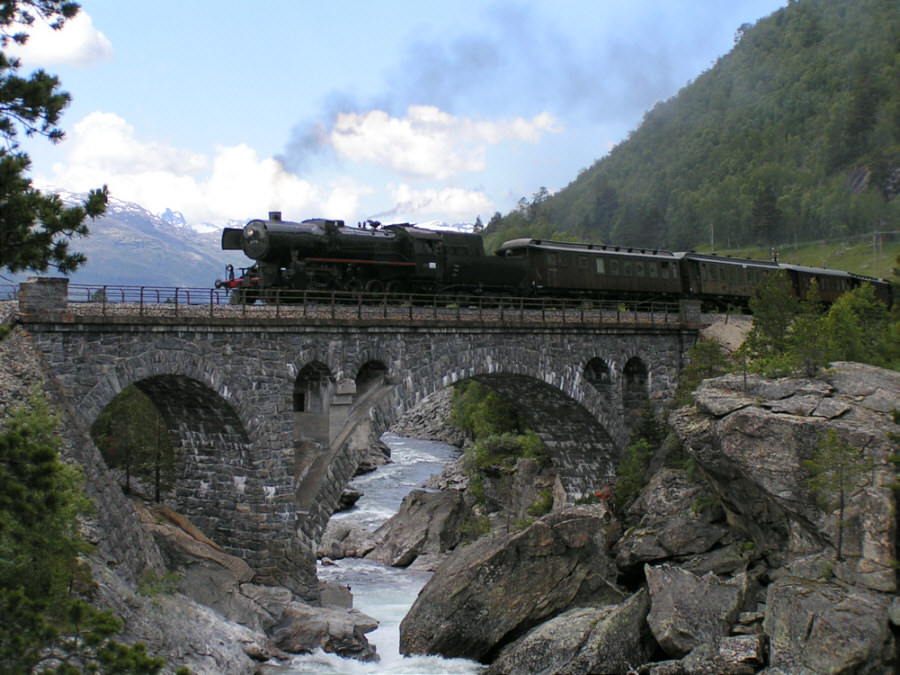
Stuguflåt Bridge

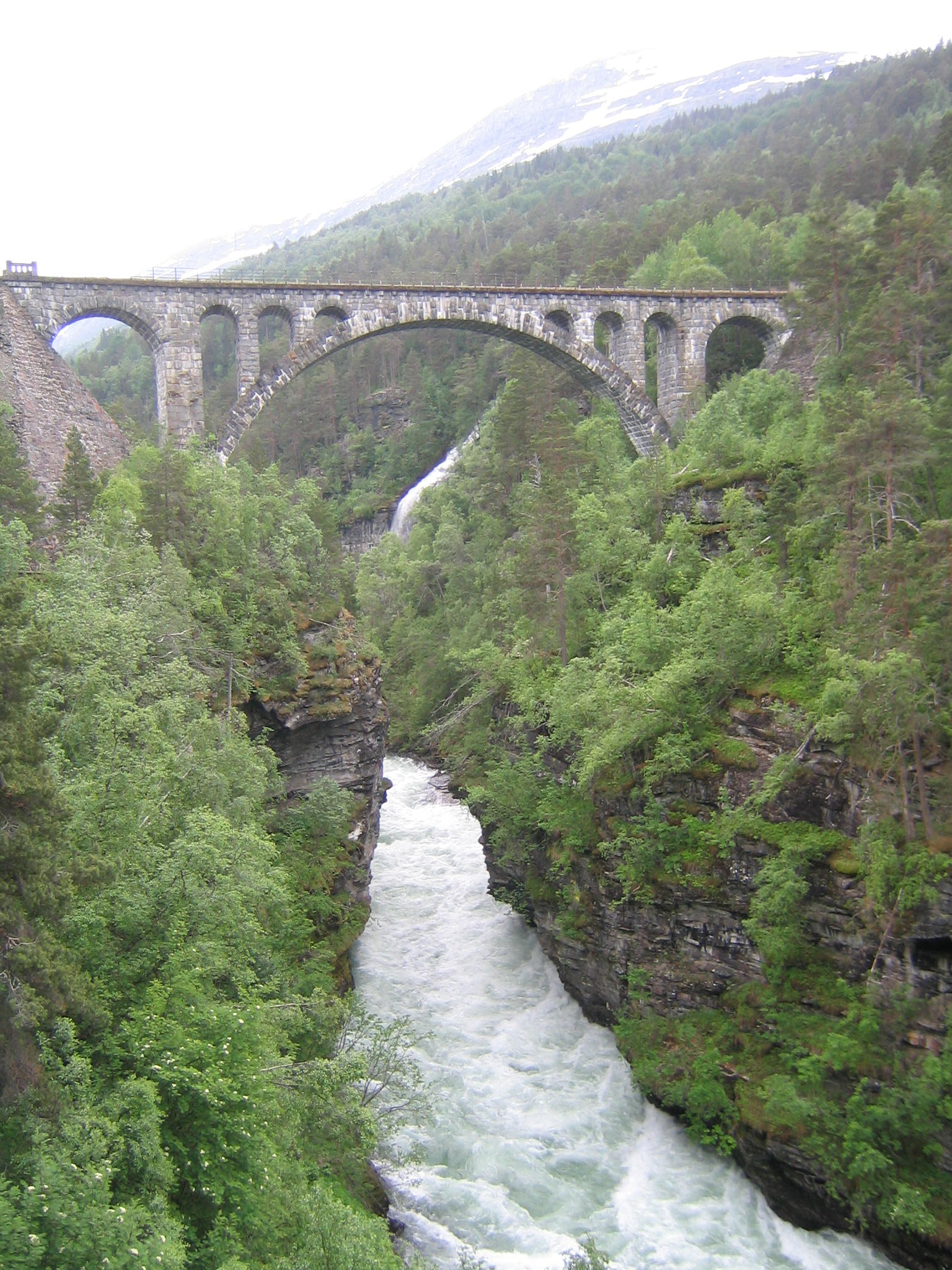
Kylling Bridge

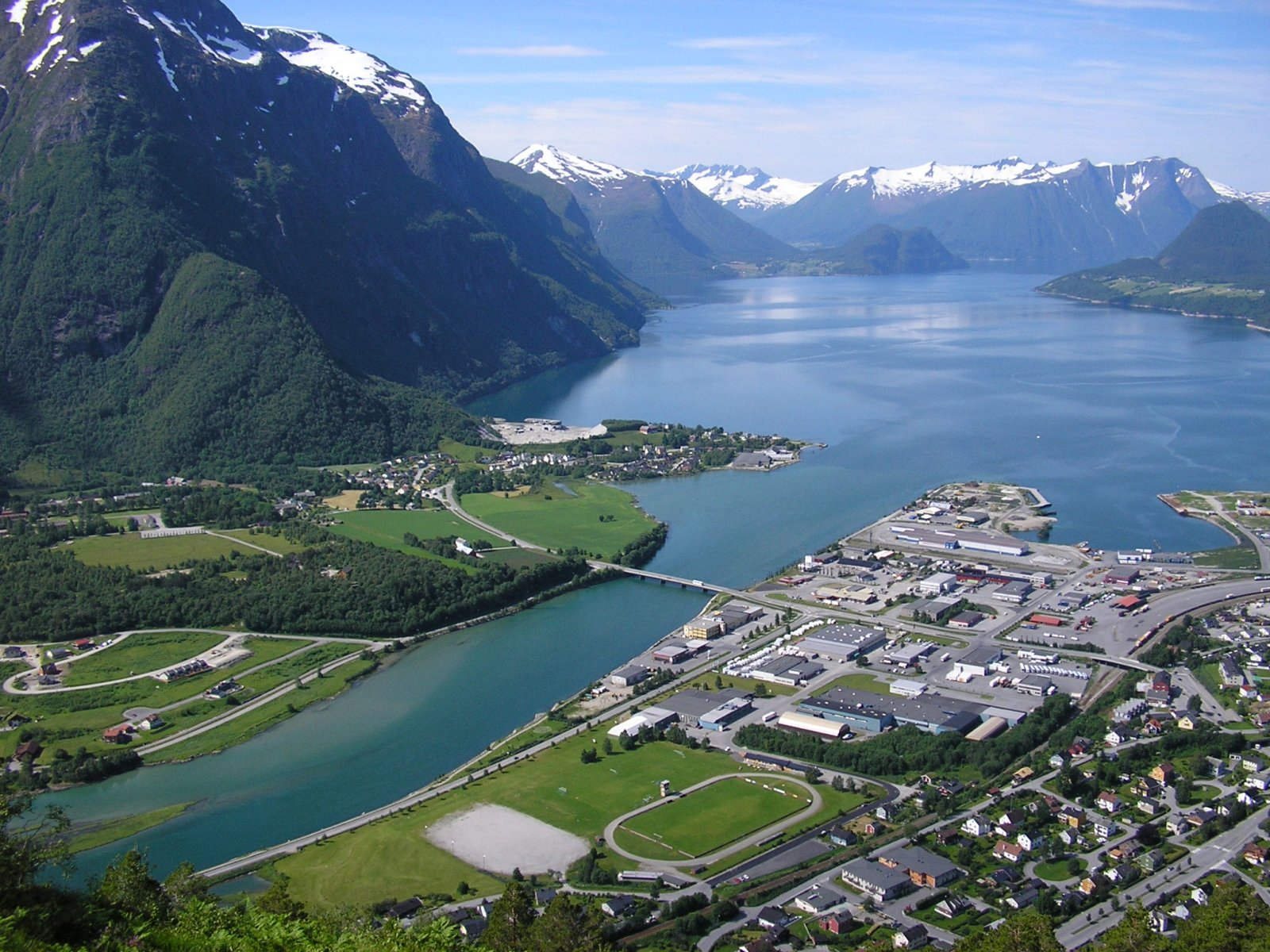
Mouth of the river at Åndalsnes

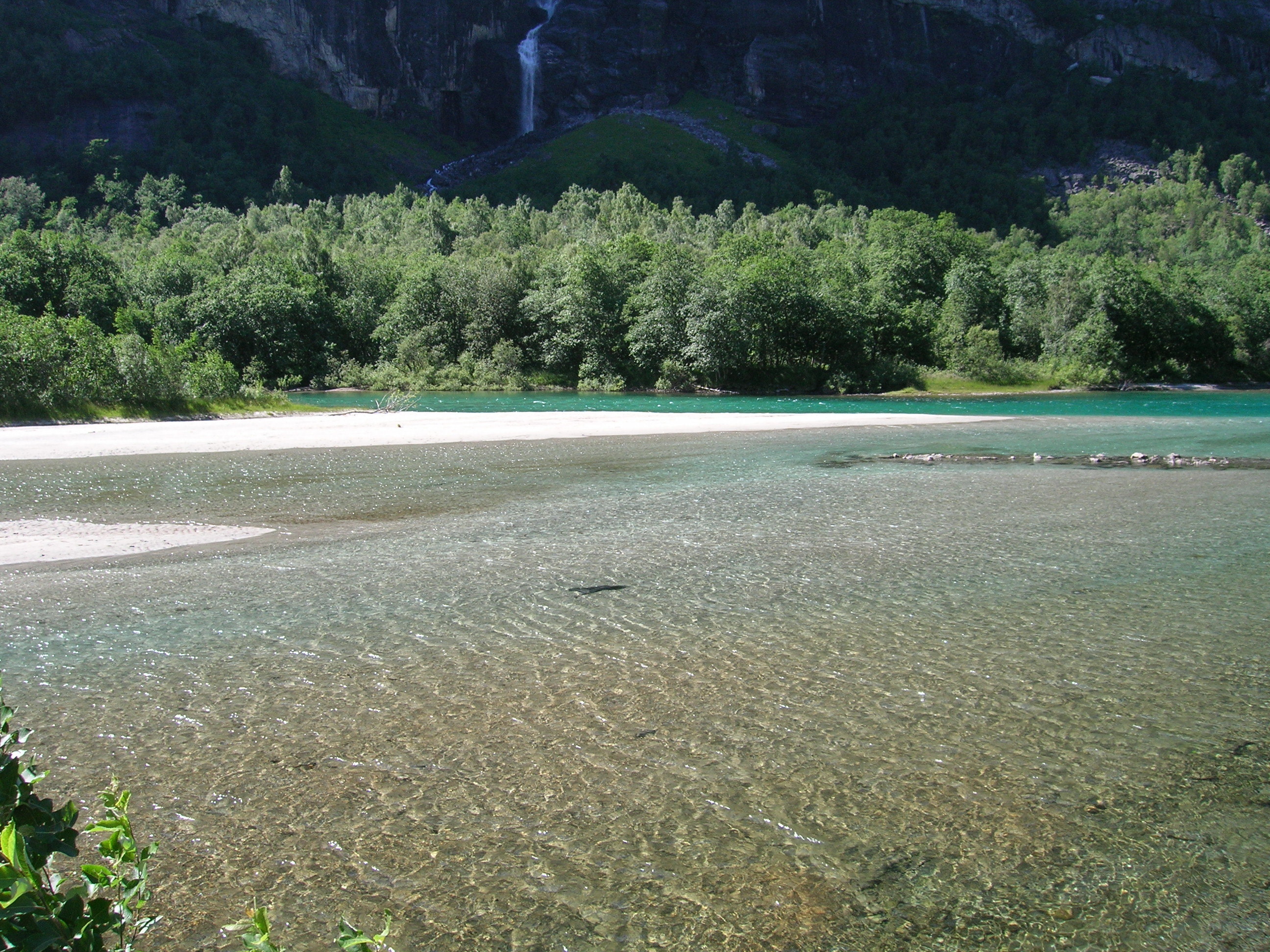
Close up picture of the river

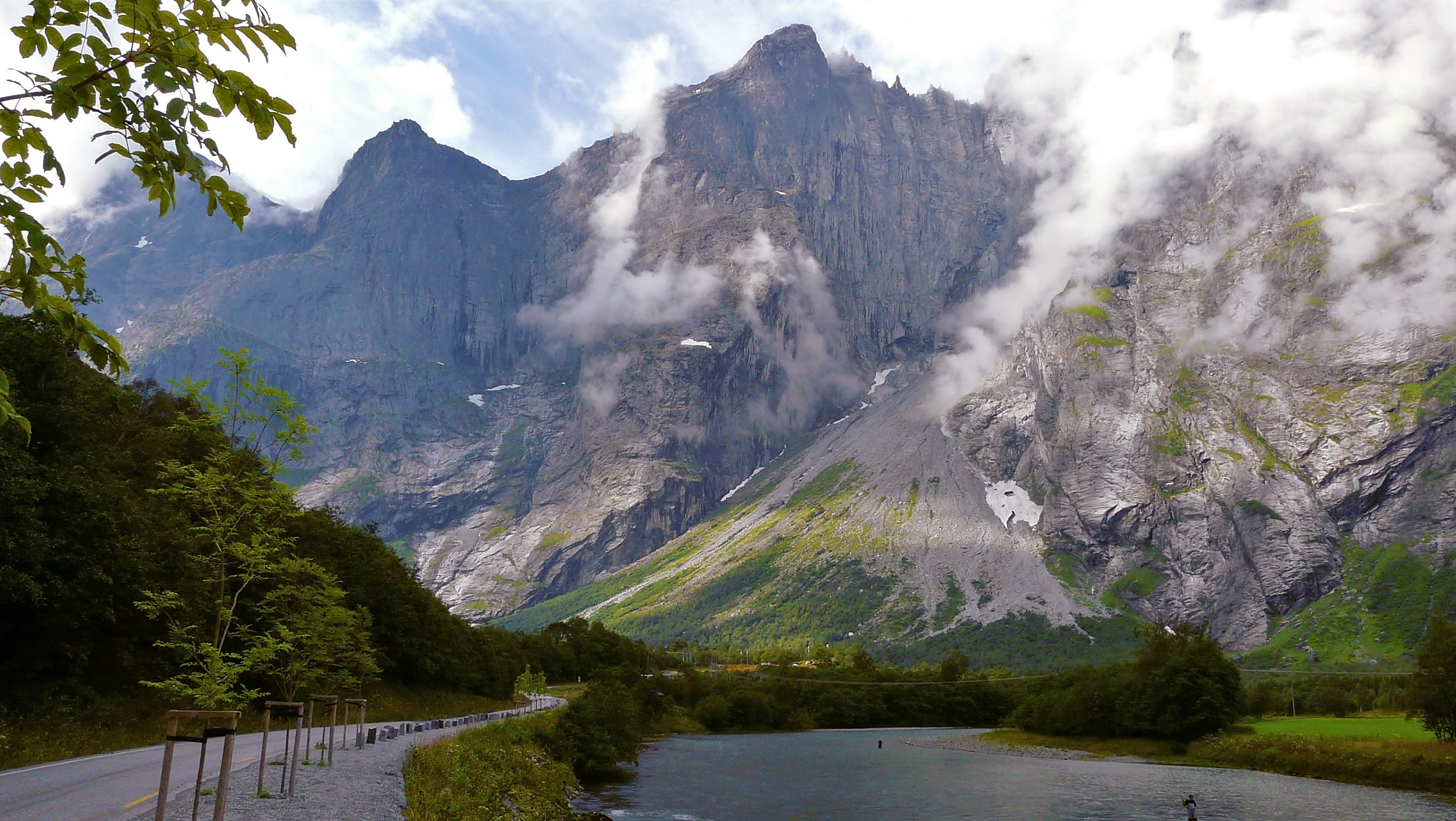
Mountains surrounding the river valley

== See also ==
- List of rivers in Norway
