= Trollryggen =

Mountain in Møre og Romsdal, Norway

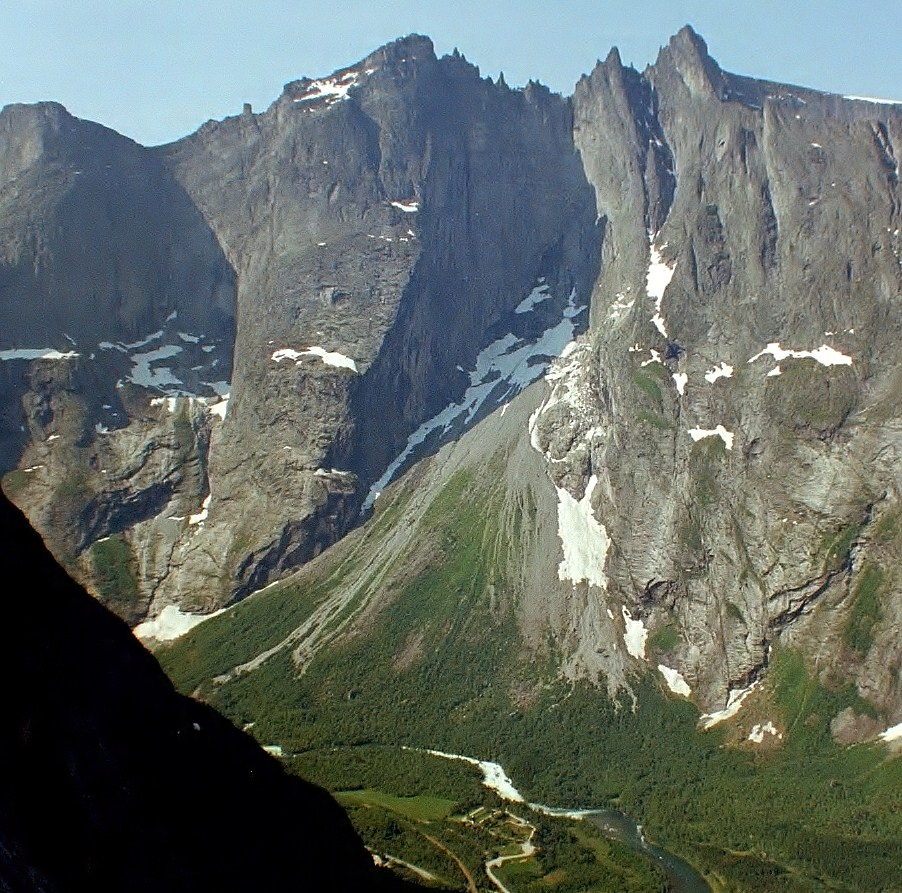
- Trollryggen is the highest peak on the left side.

Highest point
- Elevation: 1,725 m (5,659 ft)
- Prominence: 120 m (390 ft)
- Coordinates: 62.4820°N 7.7392°E

Geography
- Interactive map of the mountain
- Location: Møre og Romsdal, Norway
- Parent range: Romsdalsalpane
- Topo map: 1319 I Romsdalen

Trollryggen is a peak along the Trolltindene ridge along the Romsdalen valley. It is located in Rauma Municipality in Møre og Romsdal county, Norway. The Rauma River, the European route E136 highway and the Rauma Line railway lie just to the east of the ridge at the bottom of the valley.

The north face of the peak is part of the famous Trollveggen (lit. 'Troll Wall')—the highest vertical cliff in Europe. The highest peak on that ridge is Store Trolltinden, about 700 metres (2,300 ft) to the north. It is also a part of Reinheimen National Park.

In 1973, the first winter ascent on Trollryggen (North face - Troll Wall) was made by Wojciech Kurtyka with Marek Kęsicki, Ryszard Kowalewski, Tadeusz Piotrowski (all Polish)

== See also ==
- List of mountains of Norway
