= Frank Noel Stagg =

Commander Frank Noel Stagg RN
- Born: 25 December 1884; Tonbridge, Kent
- Died: 25 October 1956 (aged 71); London
- Military career
- Branch: Royal Navy
- Rank: Commander
- Unit: Special Operations Executive

Commander Frank Noel Stagg, RN, (25 December 1884 in Tonbridge, Kent—25 October 1956 in London) was a Royal Navy officer known for his role in Danish and Norwegian resistance movements during the Second World War.

Staggs was a Naval Control Service Officer in Trondheim and Copenhagen before the war, and was connected with the Norwegian Section of Special Operations Executive from October 1940 to July 1942, He was the planner of the raid on the Lofoten Islands.

He was honoured for services to the Norwegian Navy at St Olav on 17 October 1944.

== Early life ==
In his youth, Stagg attended Charterhouse School. He entered the Royal Navy 15 January 1900.

He married Marjorie Noble, granddaughter of Captain Horatio Nelson Noble and great granddaughter of Vice Admiral James Noble, who served in the Navy with Lord Nelson on HMS Agamemnon.

He named the Stagg Patches shoal off Queensland, whilst aboard surveying vessel HMS Fantome from 1907 to 1909.

== Later life ==
Stagg wrote several historical works, including five books about the history of Norway and its links to British history. He is also known for his contributions to local history, both in his home county of Kent and further afield, serving for a time as chairman of the County Local History Committee of the Kent Council of Social Services. He died 25 October 1956 in London.

== List of Publications ==
- Stagg, Frank Noel (1952). North Norway. London: George Allen and Unwin Ltd.
- Stagg, Frank Noel (1953). The Heart of Norway. London: George Allen and Unwin Ltd.
- Stagg, Frank Noel (1954). West Norway and its Fjords. London: George Allen and Unwin Ltd.
- Stagg, Frank Noel (1956). East Norway and its Frontier. London: George Allen and Unwin Ltd.
- Stagg, Frank Noel (1958). South Norway. London: George Allen and Unwin Ltd.
