= Romsdalen =

Valley in Romsdal, Norway

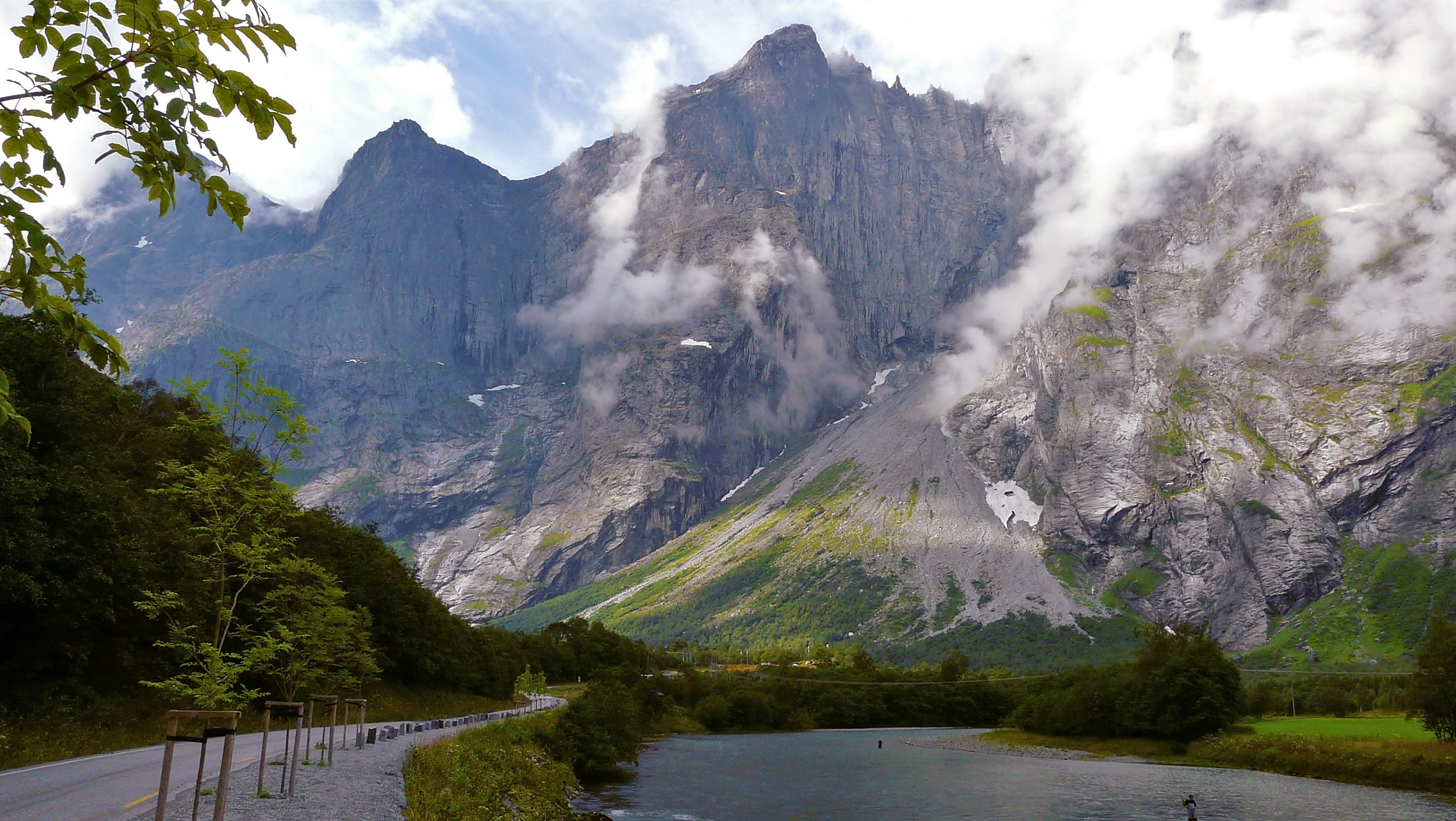
- View of the Romsdalen valley
- Length: 60 km (37 mi) NW-SE

Geology
- Type: River valley

Geography
- Location: Møre og Romsdal and Innlandet, Norway
- Population centers: Åndalsnes
- Coordinates: 62°26′50″N 07°50′00″E
- Rivers: Rauma River

Location
- Interactive map of the valley

Romsdalen is a valley in the western part of Norway. The 60-kilometre (37 mi) long valley runs from the Romsdalsfjorden through Rauma Municipality in Møre og Romsdal county and into Lesja Municipality in Innlandet county. It is the valley of the Rauma river, from Old Norse word Raumsdalr which means Rauma valley. The traditional district of Romsdal, which makes up about one-third of Møre og Romsdal county, is named for the valley of Romsdalen. The main road E136 and the Rauma line railway both run along the valley floor.

Mannen is an unstable rock formation above the valley. Mannen is expected to someday slide into the valley, blocking the river. This could result in devastating flooding downstream if the river suddenly breaks through the dam created by the rockslide. Around Remmem and Flatmark the valley is littered with huge rocks or boulders that have fallen from the high mountains surrounding the valley.

Trolltindene and other summits on the western edge are protected as part of Reinheimen National Park. Alpine summits around Isterdalen and Trollstigen are partly within the national park, partly within Trollstigen protected landscape area.

== Geography ==
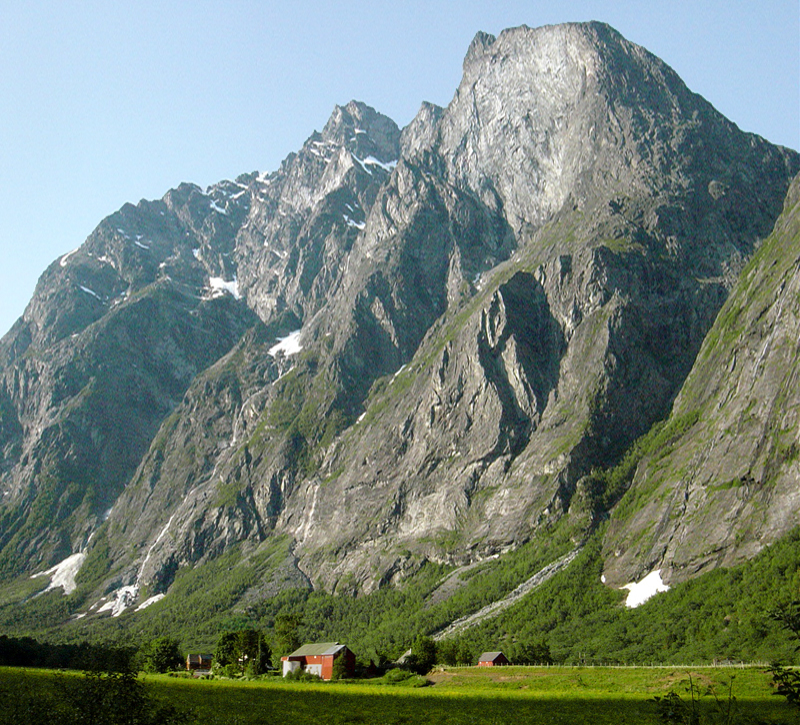
Kalskråtinden summit Credit: Halvard Hatlen

The valley begins at the lake Lesjaskogsvatnet and it follows the Rauma River to the northwest to the town of Åndalsnes, where the river empties into the inner part of the great Romsdal Fjord. The Rauma Line and European Route E136 highway both run through the valley. The Romsdalsalpene mountains surround the river and the valley, including the mountains Store Trolltind, Store Venjetinden, Trollryggen, and Romsdalshornet. Romsdalen is joined by the Isterdalen valley with the Istra river located a few kilometers upstream from Åndalsnes and the two rivers create terraces of sand and gravel on a deeper layer of clay.

Romsdal Museum (Romsdalsmuseet) based in the town of Molde is one of the largest and most extensive folk museums in Norway. The Romsdalen Folk Museum is an outdoor museum which aspects of life in the Romsdalen valley from the 14th to the 20th century.

=== Summits ===
Notable summits around the main valley:

- Romsdalshornet, at 1,550 metres (5,090 ft)
- Trolltindene including
  - Store Trolltind, at 1,788 metres (5,866 ft)
  - Trollveggen big wall
  - Trollryggen, at 1,740 metres (5,710 ft)
  - Breitind, at 1,797 metres (5,896 ft)
- Kalskråtinden, at 1,803 metres (5,915 ft)
- Romsdalseggen
- Tua (Rauma)
- Rangåhøgda

=== Waterfalls ===
Several of Norway's and the world's tallest waterfalls plunge into the main valley.

- Vermafossen, at 380 metres (1,250 ft) in height
- Døntefossen, at 700 metres (2,300 ft) in height with the longest drop at 200 metres (660 ft)
- Mongefossen, at 773 metres (2,536 ft) in height with the longest drop at 300 metres (980 ft) (listed as 15th tallest in the world)
- Ølmåafossen, at 720 metres (2,360 ft) in height

Isterdalen valley:

- Stigfossen, at 239 metres (784 ft) in height with the longest drop at 122 metres (400 ft)
- Trollfossen, at 175 metres (574 ft) in height

== Transportation ==
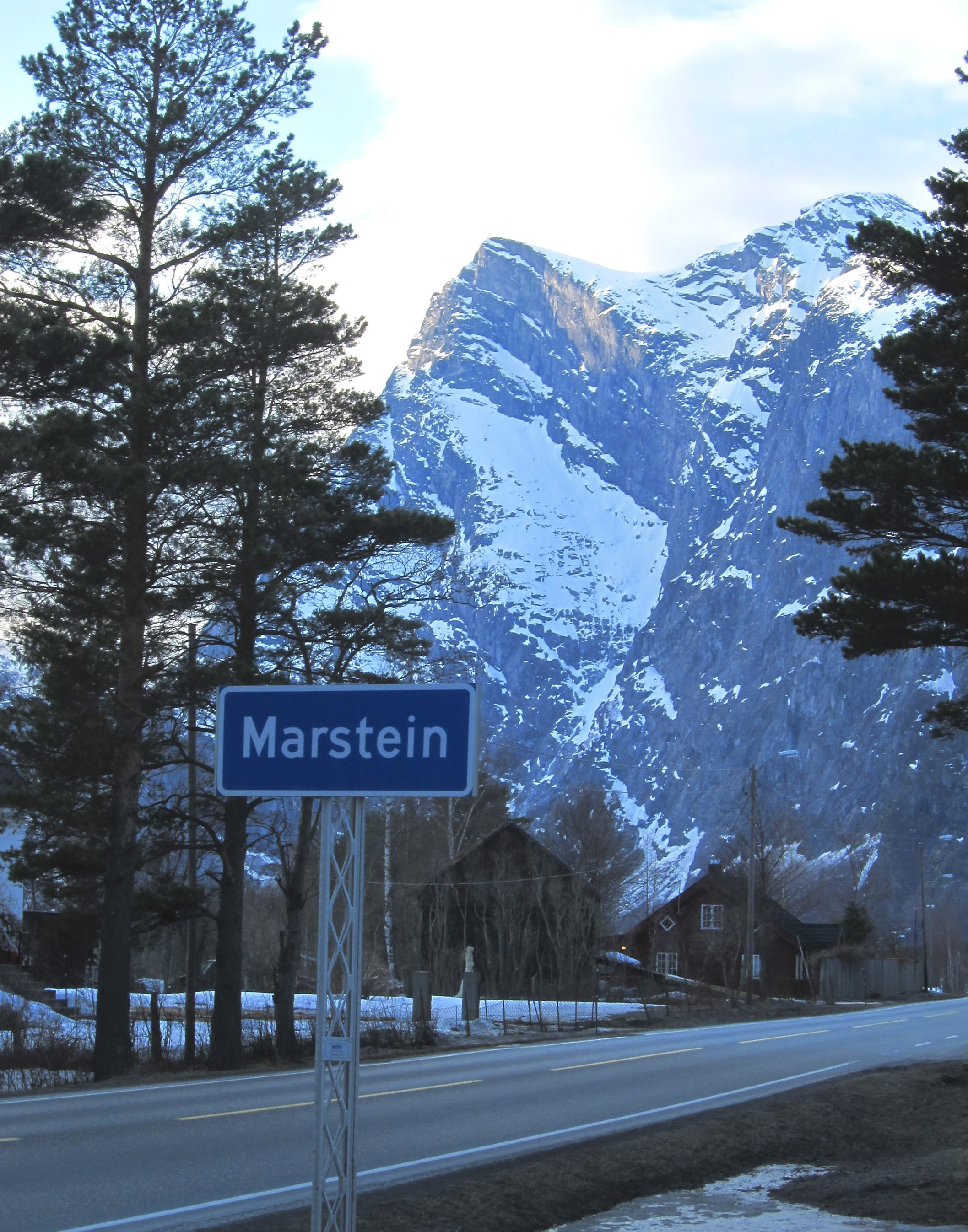
Road E136 at Marstein, Romsdalshorn in the distance.

The Rauma Line and European route E136 both run through the valley. The Rauma Line is the only railway line in Møre og Romsdal county and from 1924 until the 1970s, it was the key transport corridor between the county and Eastern Norway. The E136 highway is the only road between east and west that does not run through a mountain pass and connects the county to eastern Norway's road network. The road through Romsdalen was historically an important access to the ocean for farmers and miners in the eastern uplands. Since at least year 1500 the annual market near Åndalsnes was the largest market place outside Bergen and Trondheim. The iron works at Lesjaverk transported iron products to the port at Veblungsnes. The road was originally only for riding and walking. Around 1844 it was possible to drive the entire valley. This was at the time one of only two drivable road connections between east and west. When the telegraph was introduced in Norway in the 1860s, the line between East Norway and Møre og Romsdal was set up through the valley, as one of only two direct lines between east and west. Norwegian County Road 63 through Trollstigen mountain pass to Valldal was completed in 1936, with connections to the village of Geiranger.

== Name ==
The Old Norse form of the name was Raumsdalr. The first element is the genitive case of a name Raumr probably the old (uncompounded) name of Romsdal Fjord, again derived from the name of the river Rauma. The second part of the word is dalr which means "dale" or "valley". Thus the name means "The Dale of Rauma".

Møre og Romsdal county is partly named after the Romsdal district, which in turn got its name from the valley. The county was previously called Romsdals amt (literally Romsdal's county).

== Tourism ==
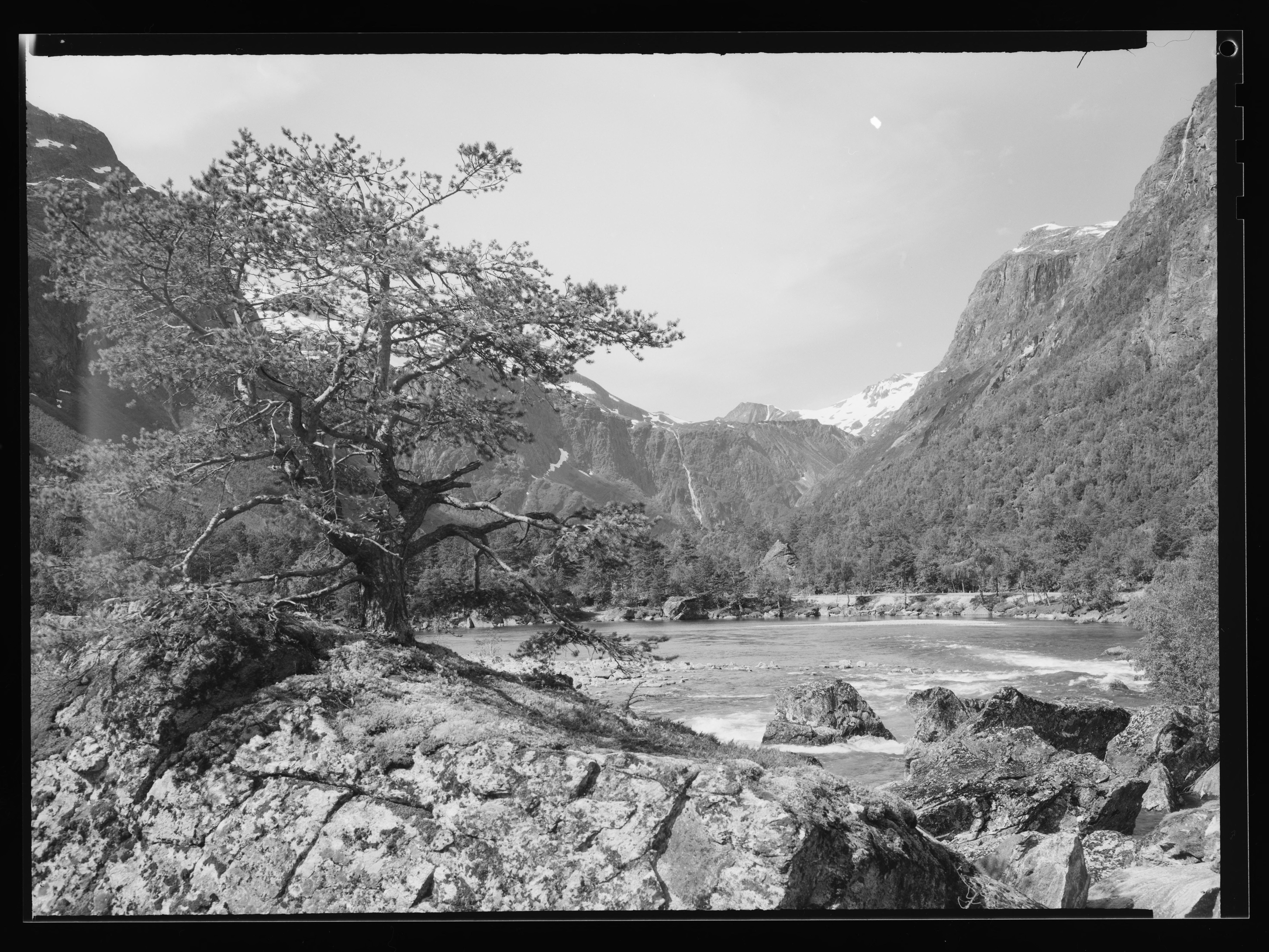
Boulder landscape at Flatmark photo:Jac Brun

Tourism and angling in the Rauma river became an important business during the 19th century, wealthy Englishmen were the most important visitors. General William Bromley-Davenport purchased Fiva farm in 1849 and the 12 best kilometers of the river. Norway's first golf course was laid out in 1905 at Hølgenes hotel (later named Park hotel) by the English owner. The Romsdalen valley and the Romsdalen Alps are one of the most important climbing venues in Norway and Northern Europe. The steep and demanding Trollveggen is a classic in Norwegian rock face climbing. William Cecil Slingsby visited Romsdalen in 1875 and later. Arne Randers Heen was a local climber with several first ascents.

== In fiction ==
The fictional detective Harry Hole is mentioned as being originally from Åndalsnes in the Romsdalen valley, while the series' writer Jo Nesbø is actually from Molde in the same region. The Bat, first book in the Harry Hole series, includes a passage of reminiscences, which might be based on the writer's own experiences:

"... [Harry Hole] told him about Åndalsnes, a tiny settlement up in Romsdalen Valley, surrounded by high mountains which were so beautiful that his mother had always told him that that was where God had started when He was creating the world, and that He had spent so long on Romsdalen that the rest of the world had to be done post-haste to be finished by Sunday. And fishing with his father on the fjord early in the morning, in July, and lying on the shore and smelling the sea - while the gulls screamed and the mountains stood like silent, immovable guards around their little kingdom".

— Jo Nesbø, The Bat, chapter 23

In the 1995 survival horror video game Clock Tower: The First Fear, the Barrows Mansion (the primary setting for the game) is situated in the mountains of Romsdalen.

== History ==
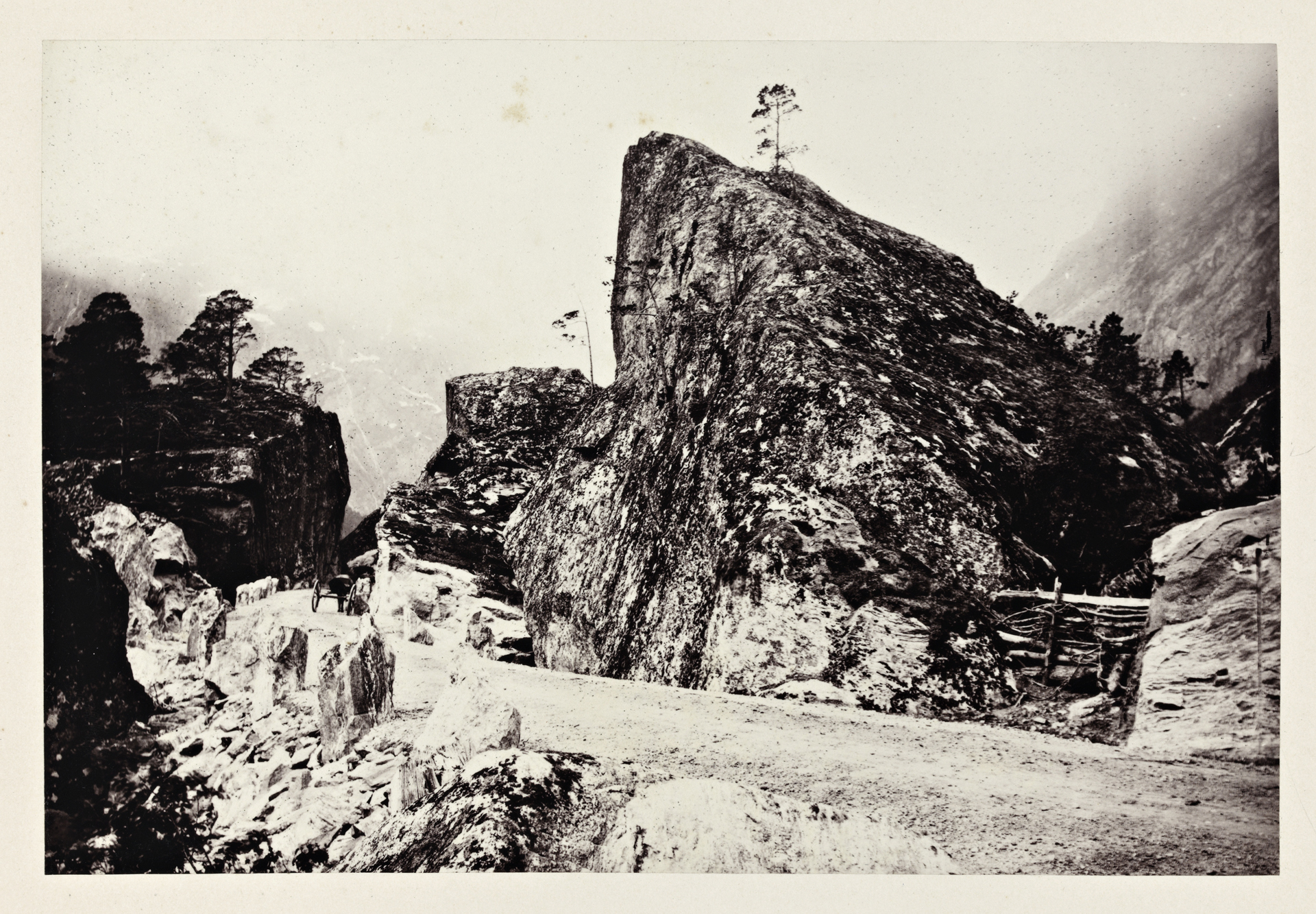
Road through boulder landscape. photo: Edward Backhouse Mounsey, 1869

In 1612, a group of some 300 Scottish mercenaries landed near Åndalsnes and marched through the valley towards Sweden. The group was later massacred at Battle of Kringen.

After the German invasion of Norway on April 9, 1940, British troops landed at Åndalsnes and Namsos in an attempt to liberate Trondheim through large pincer movement. British vanguard force arrived at Åndalsnes on 12 April. The main landing of British troops, consisting primarily of the British 148th Infantry Brigade and commanded by Major General Bernard Paget, occurred on 17 April. On the day of the invasion, German troops immediately took control of Oslo, Stavanger, Bergen and Trondheim, while Åndalsnes and the towns of Møre og Romsdal remained free. Åndalsnes was the only free port with a railway connection south of Trondheim. The first British troops travelled from Åndalsnes to Dombås, a key road and railway junction, on April 19.

When the German invasion began the national gold holding was evacuated from Oslo through Romsdalen to Åndalsnes and Molde, and then by ship to Tromsø.
