= Gjøvik Church =

Church in Innlandet, Norway

- Gjøvik kirke
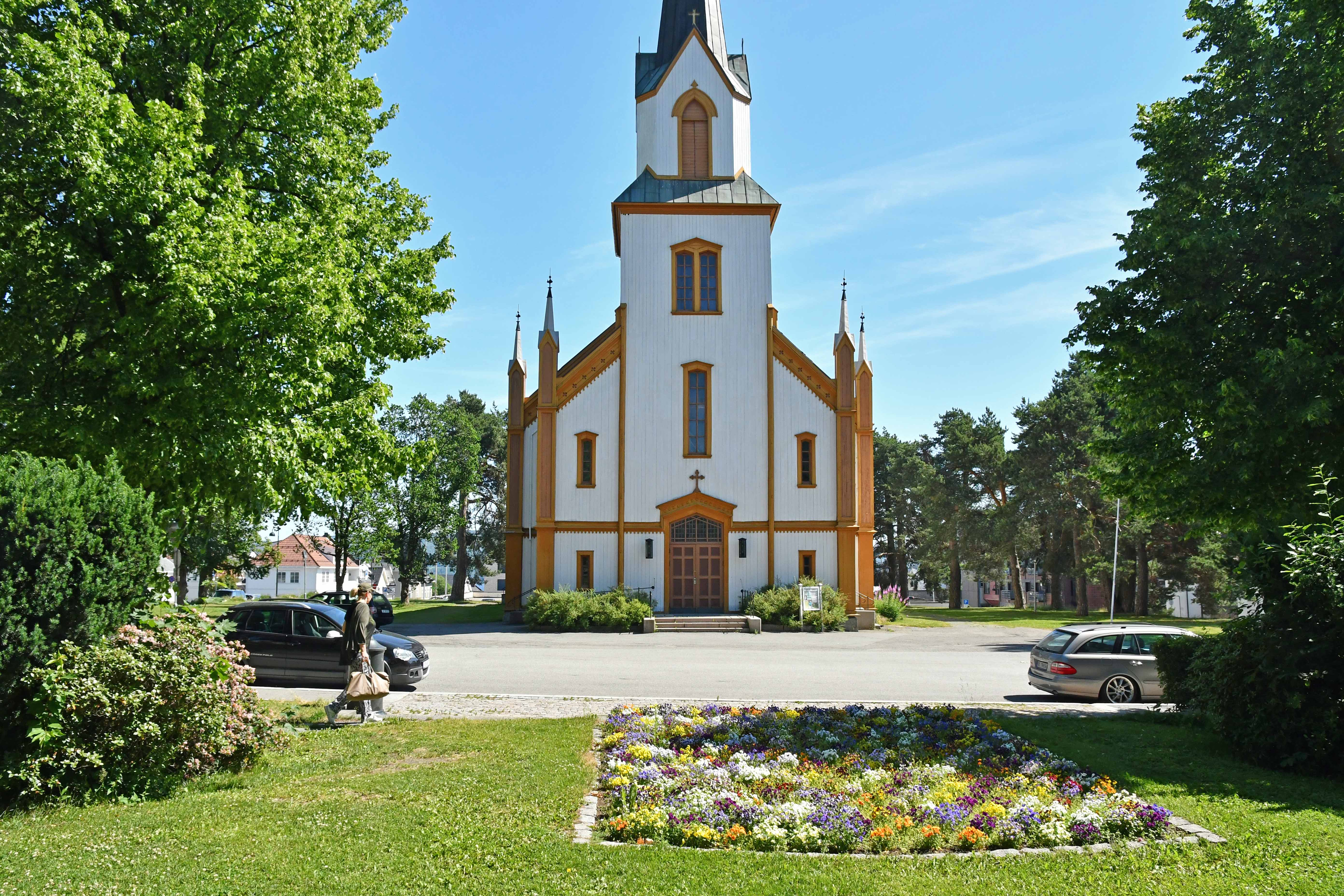
- View of the church
- Gjøvik Church
- 60°47′53″N 10°41′16″E
- Location: Gjøvik Municipality, Innlandet
- Country: Norway
- Denomination: Church of Norway
- Previous denomination: Catholic Church
- Churchmanship: Evangelical Lutheran

History
- Former name(s): Hund kirke Hunn kirke
- Status: Parish church
- Founded: 12th century
- Consecrated: 1882

Architecture
- Functional status: Active
- Architect: Jacob Wilhelm Nordan
- Architectural type: Long church
- Style: Neo-Gothic
- Completed: 1882 (144 years ago)

Specifications
- Capacity: 600
- Materials: Wood

Administration
- Diocese: Hamar bispedømme
- Deanery: Toten prosti
- Parish: Gjøvik
- Norwegian Cultural Heritage Site
- Type: Church
- Status: Protected
- ID: 84266

Gjøvik Church (Norwegian: Gjøvik kirke) is a parish church of the Church of Norway in Gjøvik Municipality in Innlandet county, Norway. It is located in the town of Gjøvik. It is the church for the Gjøvik parish which is part of the Toten prosti (deanery) in the Diocese of Hamar. The white, wooden church was built in a long church design in 1882 using plans drawn up by the architect Jacob Wilhelm Nordan. The church seats about 600 people.

== History ==
The earliest existing historical records of the church date back to the year 1577, but the church was not built that year. The first church her was a wooden stave church that was likely built during the 12th century (c. 1150 or later). This church stood on the old Hund farm (later spelled Hunn), which was about 500 metres (1,600 ft) northwest of the present site of the church. This church was historically known as Hund Church or Hunn Church. Historically, this church was an annex chapel to the main Haug Church (the nearby Bråstad Church was also an annex to this church). In 1663, the old stave church was torn down and a new timber-framed long church was built on the same site. Not much is known about this building.

In the early 1800s, the parish decided to close the Bråstad Church and merge it with Hunn Church. As part of this decision, they also decided to replace the old Hunn Church with a new, larger church on higher ground about 200 metres (660 ft) to the northwest of the old church site (this is where the present cemetery is located). Abraham Pihl was hired to design the new church and Svend Aspaas was hired to lead the construction. Work on the new Hunn Church took place from 1818 to 1821. The new church was a large octagonal building with a church porch on the west end and a sacristy on the east end. The old Hunn Church was torn down in 1822 after the new church was completed. In 1825, the exterior received wood siding that was painted white.

In 1861, the town of Gjøvik was established, just to the southeast of the church. The town did not have its own church, so the town residents used the nearby rural parish which included Hunn Church. The people of the town desired their own church and the "new" Hunn Church from 1821 was rapidly falling into disrepair. Eventually, it was decided to tear down the old Hunn Church and to replace it with a new church in the town of Gjøvik, about 800 metres (2,600 ft) to the southeast of the existing Hunn Church. The attorney M.E. Hoff and his wife donated money for the new church provided that all the salvageable materials from the old church would be used in the construction of the new church. The new neo-Gothic style church was designed by Jacob Wilhelm Nordan. Construction took place from 1881 to 1882 and the new building was consecrated in 1882. This new church was not given the historical name Hunn Church, but rather, it was named after the new town, Gjøvik Church. The cemetery at the old church site continued to be used since the new church had no room for a graveyard.

Years later, in 1968, a new Hunn Church was built on a new site about 2 kilometres (1.2 mi) west of the town. It was named Hunn Church to bring back the historical church name, but it has no connection to the historical Hunn Church in the present-day town of Gjøvik.

== Media gallery ==
Current church (since 1882)

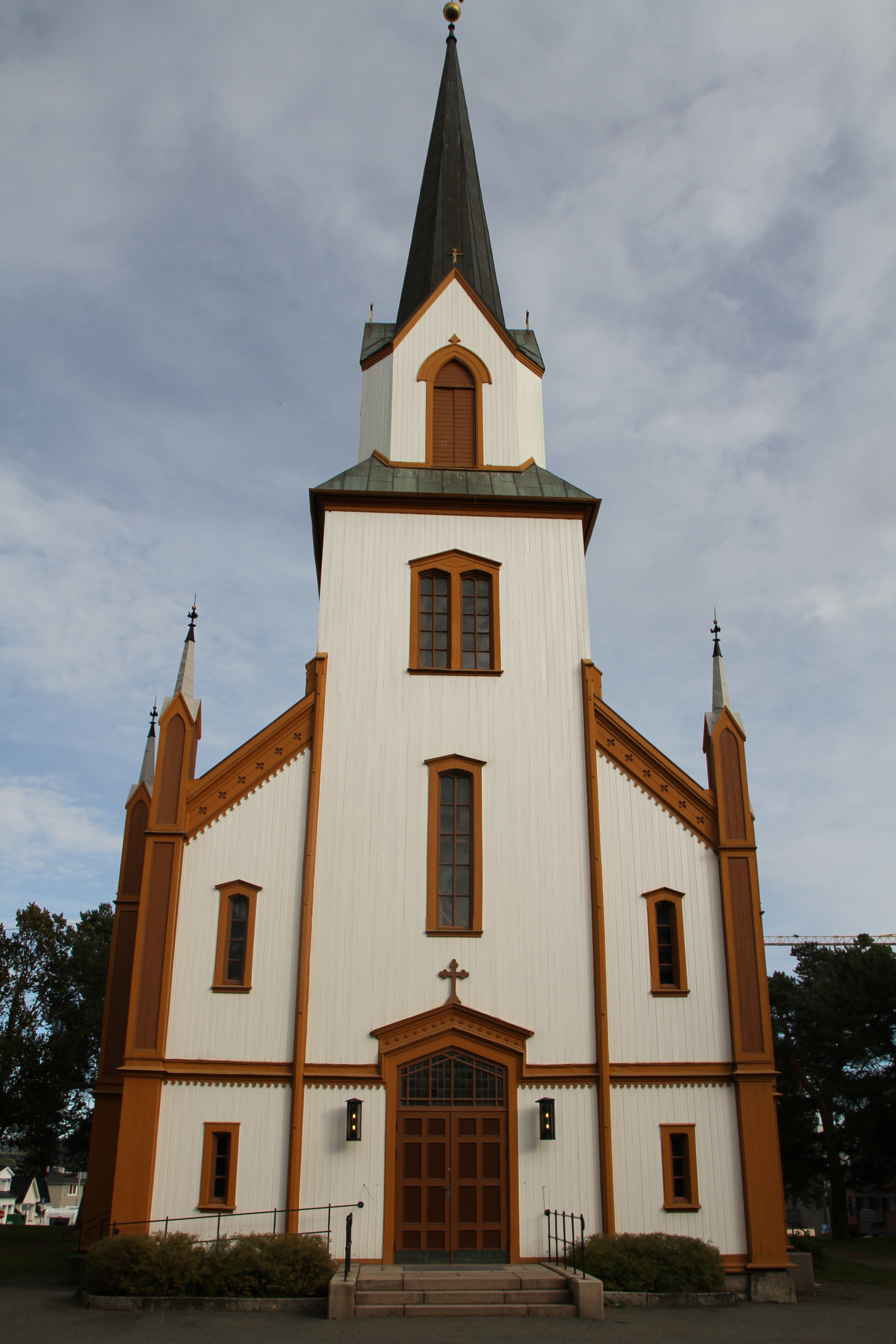

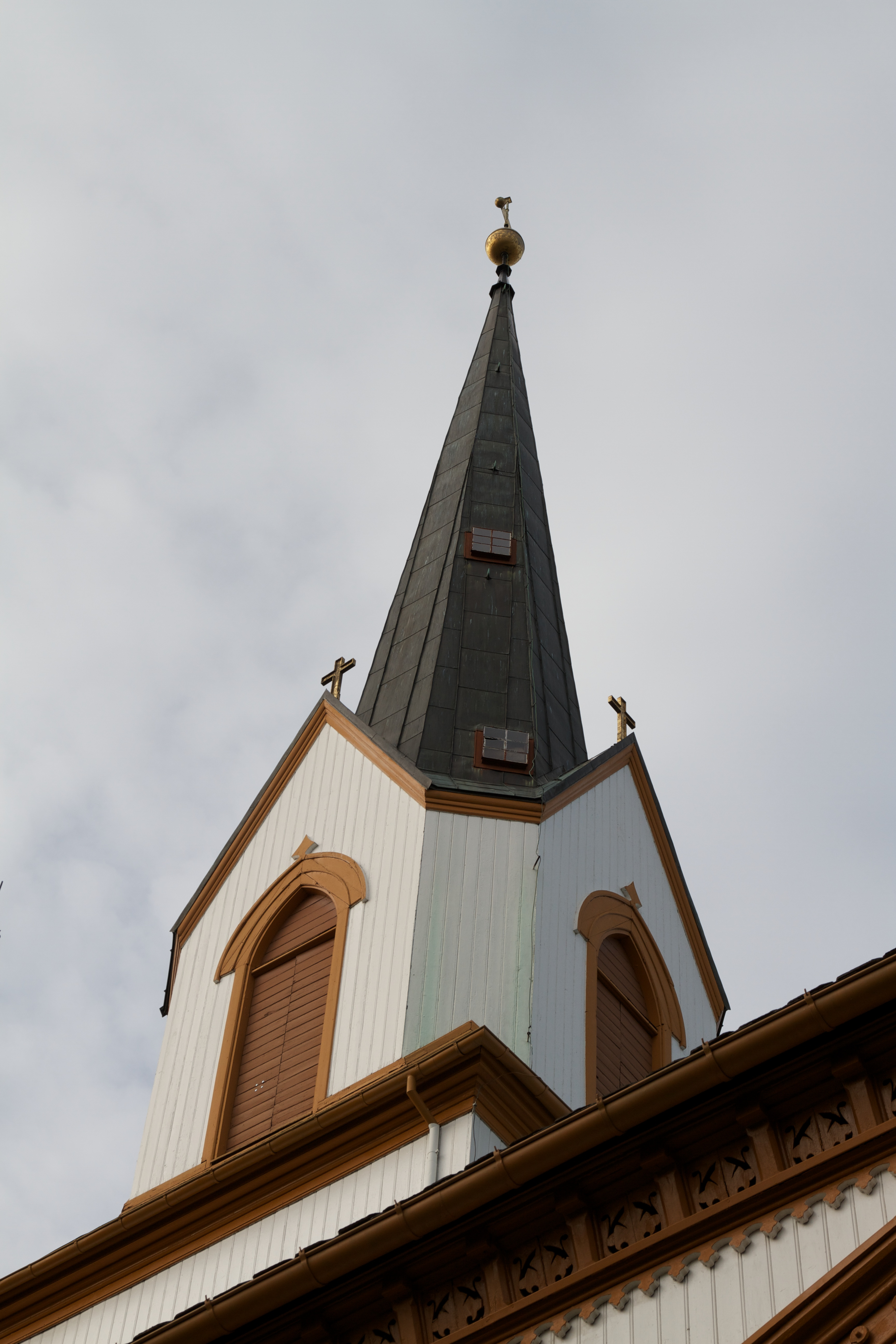

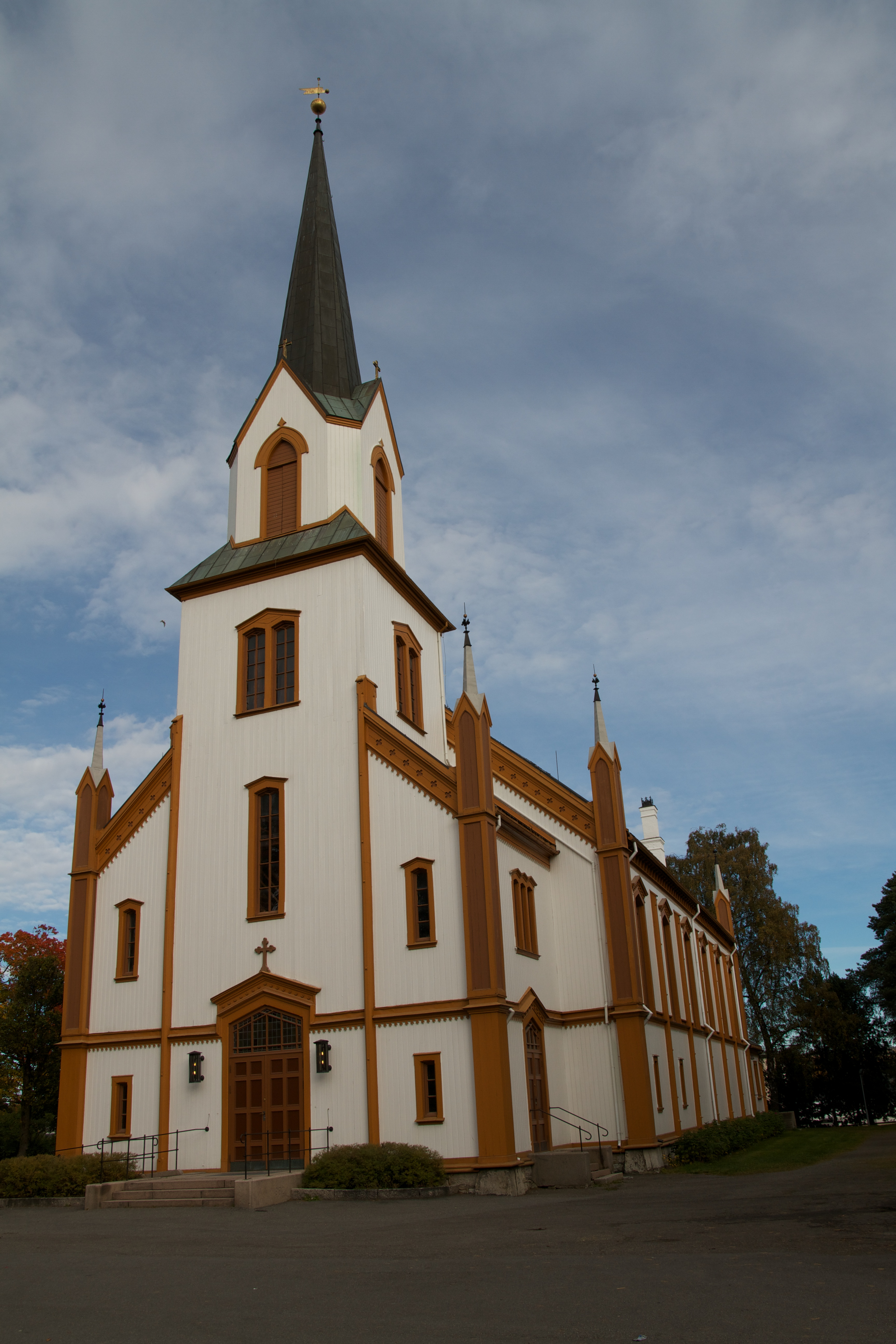

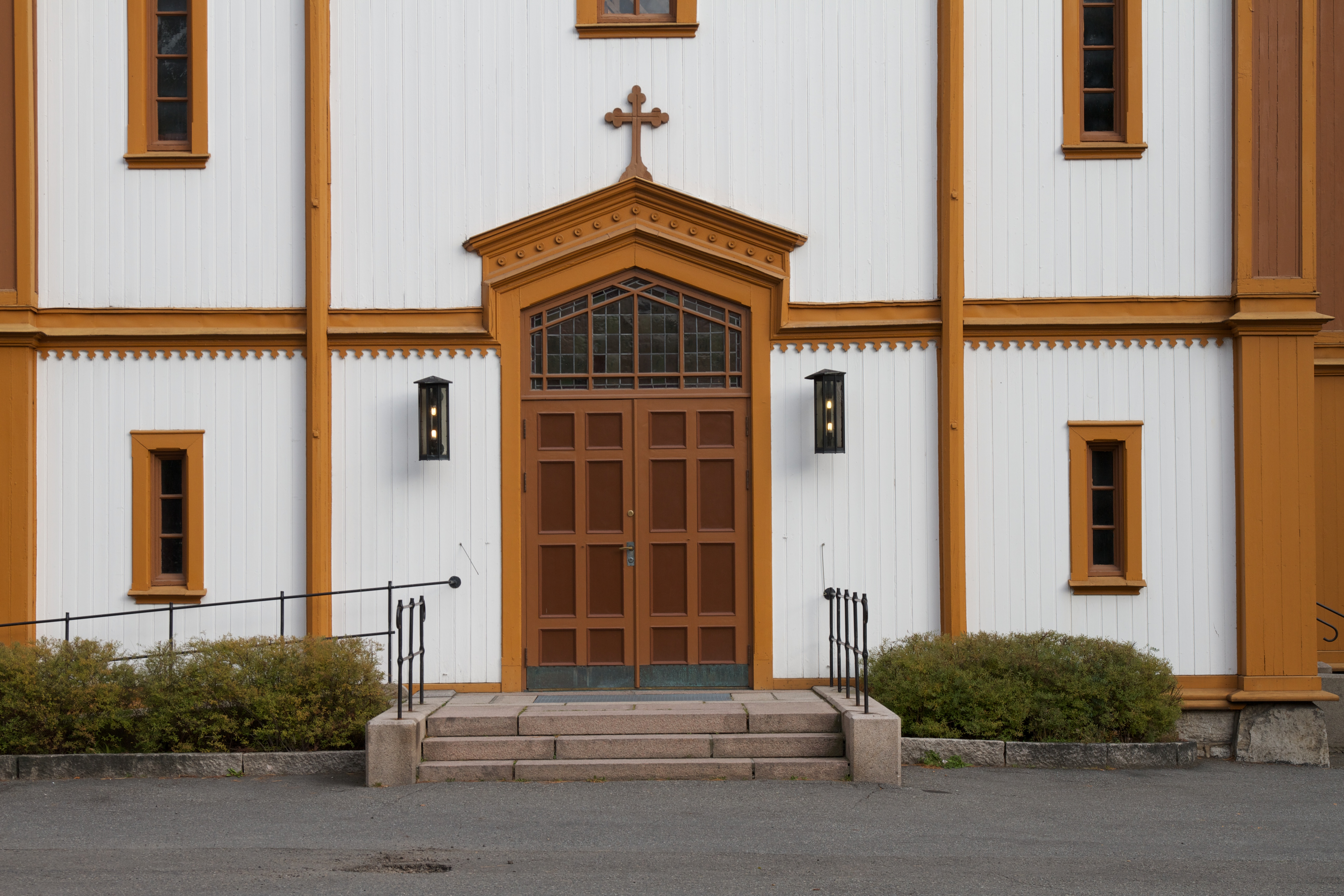

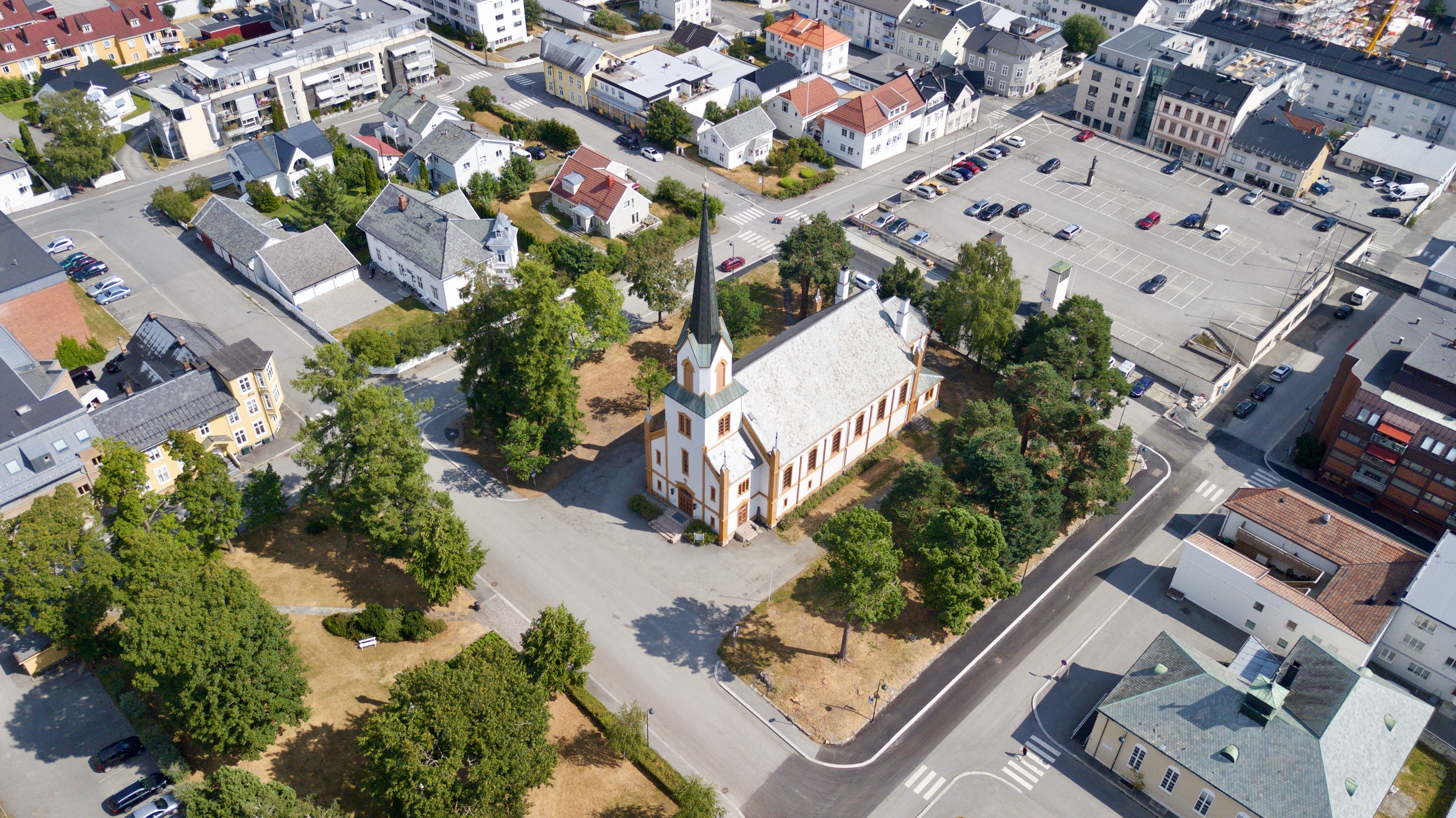
Old church (1821-1882)

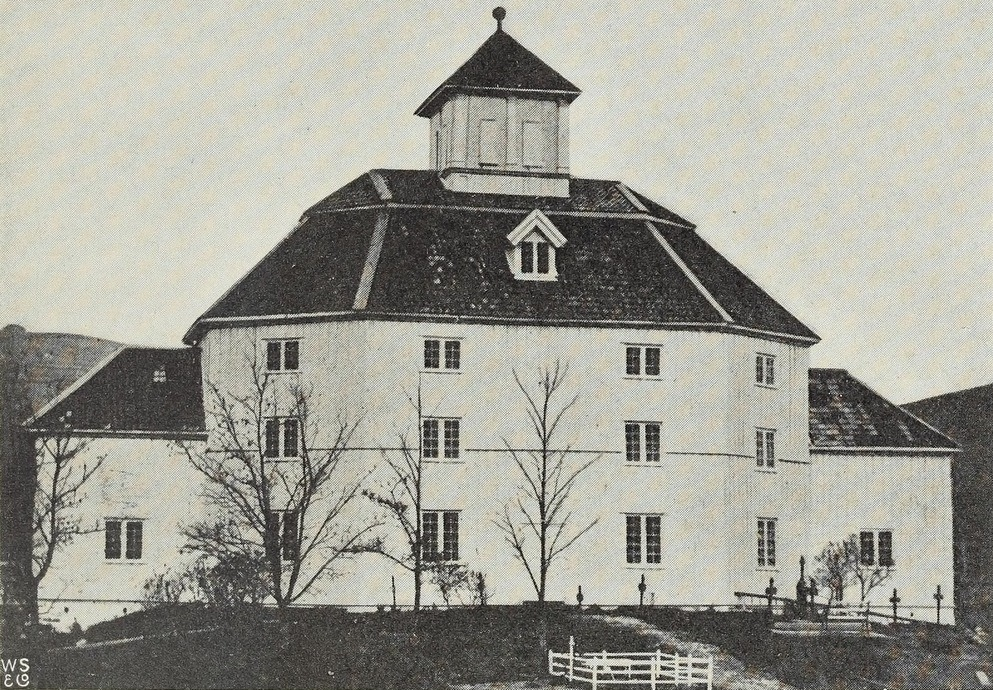
View of the old Hunn church

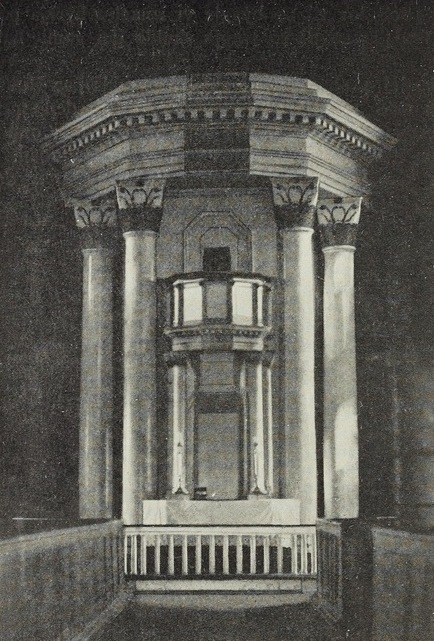
Interior pulpit altar of the old church

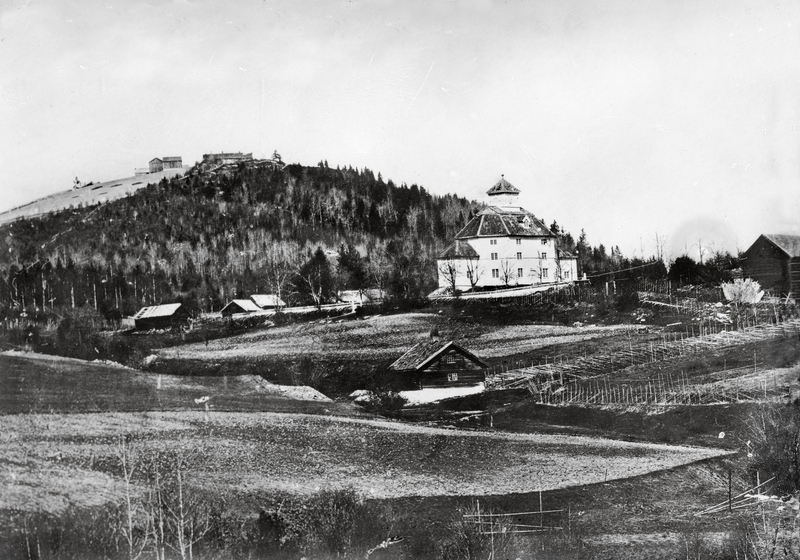
Old church

== See also ==
- List of churches in Hamar
