= Innfjorden Chapel =

Church in Møre og Romsdal, Norway

- Innfjorden bedehuskapell
- Innfjorden Chapel
- 62°29′34″N 7°33′35″E
- Location: Rauma Municipality, Møre og Romsdal
- Country: Norway
- Denomination: Church of Norway
- Churchmanship: Evangelical Lutheran

History
- Status: Chapel
- Founded: 1897
- Consecrated: 1976

Architecture
- Functional status: Active
- Architect: Ingvald Moldsvor
- Architectural type: Long church
- Completed: 1976 (50 years ago)

Specifications
- Capacity: 200
- Materials: Brick

Administration
- Diocese: Møre bispedømme
- Deanery: Indre Romsdal prosti
- Parish: Voll
- Norwegian Cultural Heritage Site
- Type: Church
- Status: Not protected
- ID: 84724

Innfjorden Chapel (Norwegian: Innfjorden bedehuskapell) is a parish church of the Church of Norway in Hustadvika Municipality in Møre og Romsdal county, Norway. It is located in the village of Innfjorden. It is one of the churches for the Voll parish which is part of the Indre Romsdal prosti (deanery) in the Diocese of Møre. The white, brick church was built in a long church design in 1976 using plans drawn up by the architect Ingvald Moldsvor. The church seats about 200 people.

== History ==
Historically, the Innfjorden area was part of the Voll Church parish. In 1897, a small wooden prayer house was built in Innfjorden. It was located about 100 metres (330 ft) north of the present site of the chapel. In 1906, a choir and church porch with a tower were added. After the renovations, the building was consecrated as a chapel. In 1976, a new, larger chapel was constructed about 100 metres (330 ft) south of the old chapel. After the new building was completed, the old chapel was torn down. The new concrete building was designed by Ingvald Moldsvor. The new building was consecrated in 1976 by the Bishop Tord Godal. The altarpiece, pulpit, and baptismal font from the old chapel were all moved to the new chapel to be reused there. The two-storey building has a large 200-seat sanctuary on the top floor. The lower floor has a large kitchen and church hall that seats about 80. In 2008, a new handicap-accessible entrance and bathroom were added and the roof was replaced.

== See also ==
- List of churches in Møre
