= Hunn Church =

Church in Innlandet, Norway

- Hunn kirke
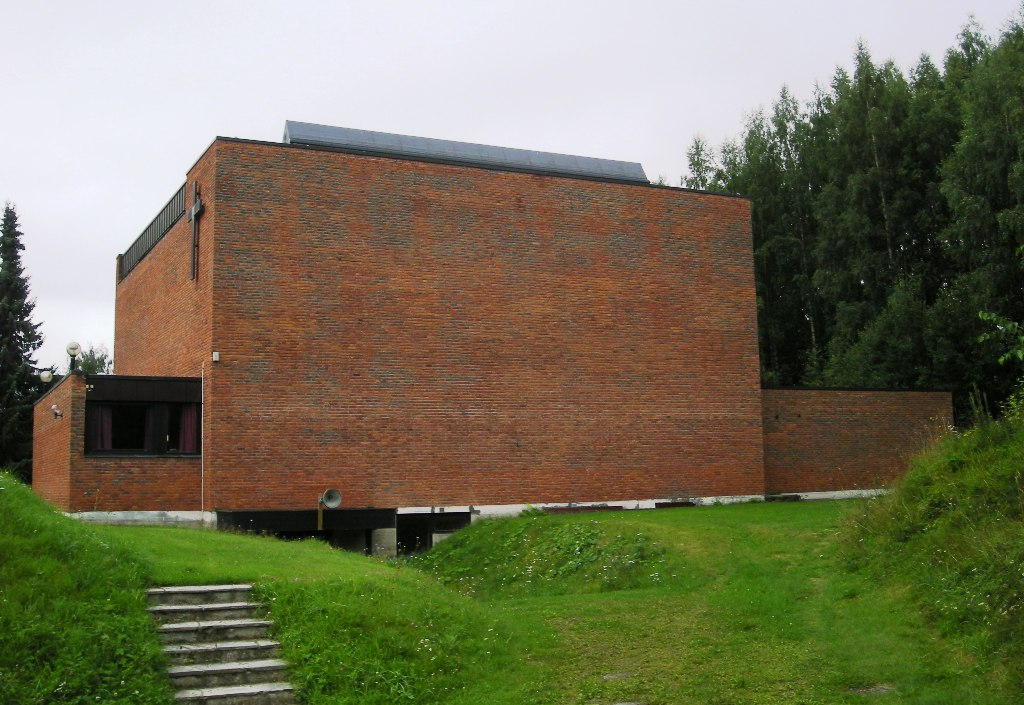
- View of the church
- Hunn Church
- 60°47′38″N 10°39′25″E
- Location: Gjøvik Municipality, Innlandet
- Country: Norway
- Denomination: Church of Norway
- Churchmanship: Evangelical Lutheran

History
- Status: Parish church
- Founded: 1968
- Consecrated: 15 September 1968

Architecture
- Functional status: Active
- Architect: Helge Abrahamsen
- Architectural type: Rectangular
- Completed: 1968 (58 years ago)

Specifications
- Capacity: 500
- Materials: Brick

Administration
- Diocese: Hamar bispedømme
- Deanery: Toten prosti
- Parish: Hunn
- Norwegian Cultural Heritage Site
- Type: Church
- Status: Not protected

Hunn Church (Norwegian: Hunn kirke) is a parish church of the Church of Norway in Gjøvik Municipality, Innlandet county, Norway. It is located in the Hunndalen valley, just west of the town of Gjøvik. It is the church for the Hunn parish which is part of the Toten prosti (deanery) in the Diocese of Hamar. The red brick church was built in a rectangular design in 1968 using plans drawn up by the architect Helge Abrahamsen. The church seats about 500 people.

== History ==
For centuries, the Old Hunn Church served the area surrounding the present-day town of Gjøvik. In 1882, the old Hunn Church was replaced with a new church in the town of Gjøvik. This new church was named Gjøvik Church in honor of the new town. The old name of Hunn was no longer used. Nearly a century later, during the 1960s, the parish began planning for a new church in the Hunndalen valley, just west of the town of Gjøvik. At this time, the parish decided to bring back the historic name Hunn for the new church, even though it is a new church in a new location with no shared history with the old church. Helge Abrahamsen was hired to design the new, modern brick building. The new church was consecrated on 15 September 1968. The church has a free-standing bell tower.

== Media gallery ==
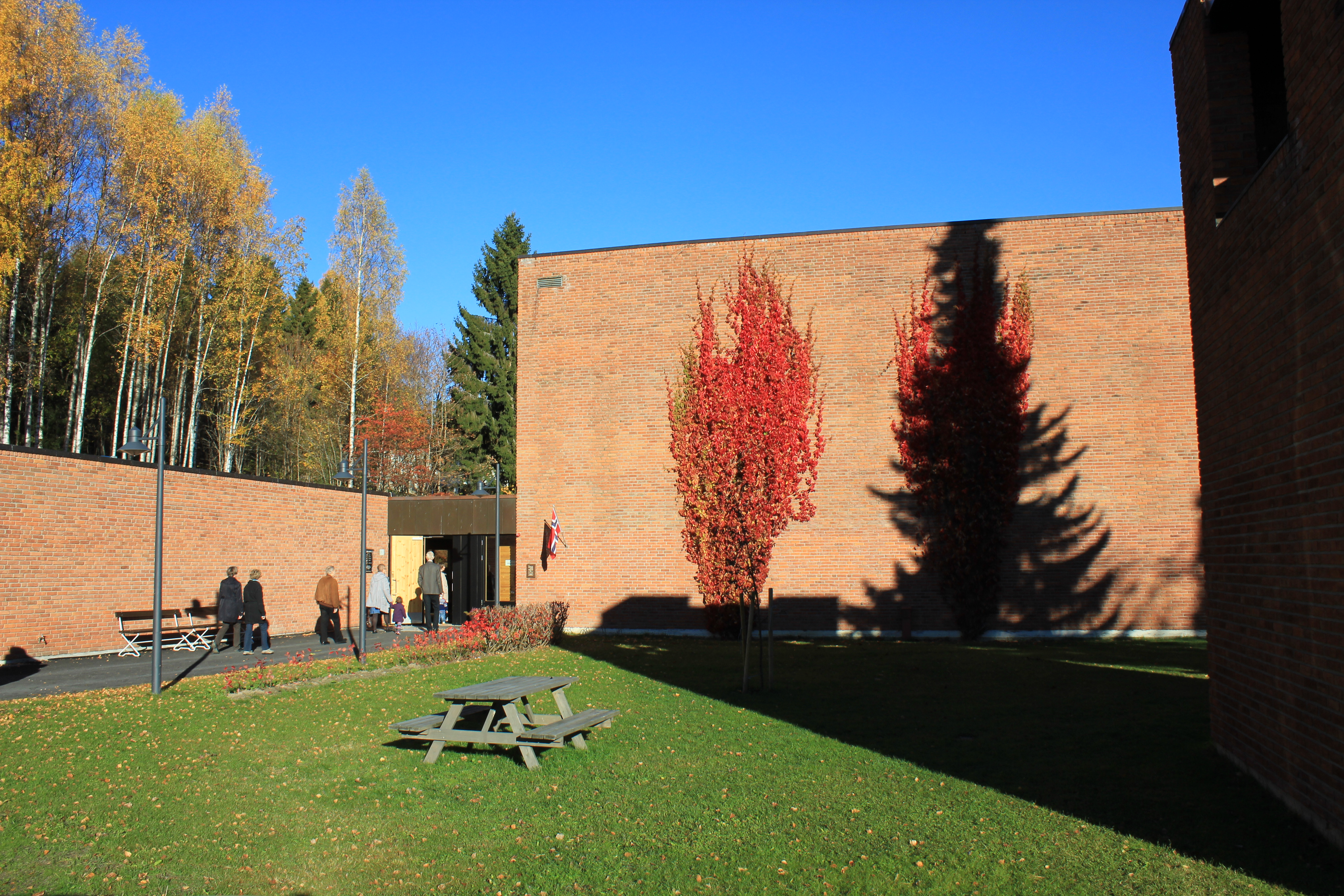

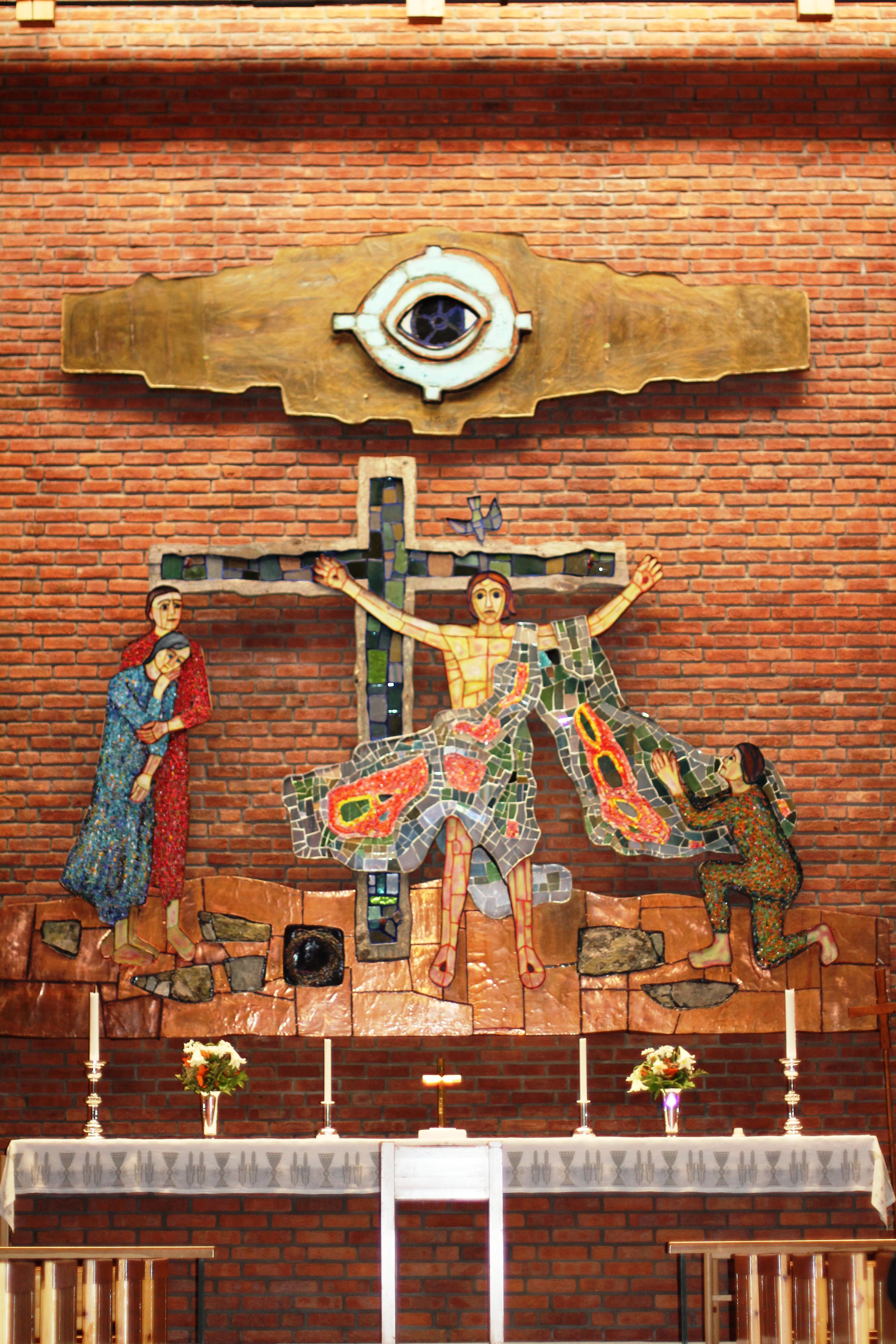

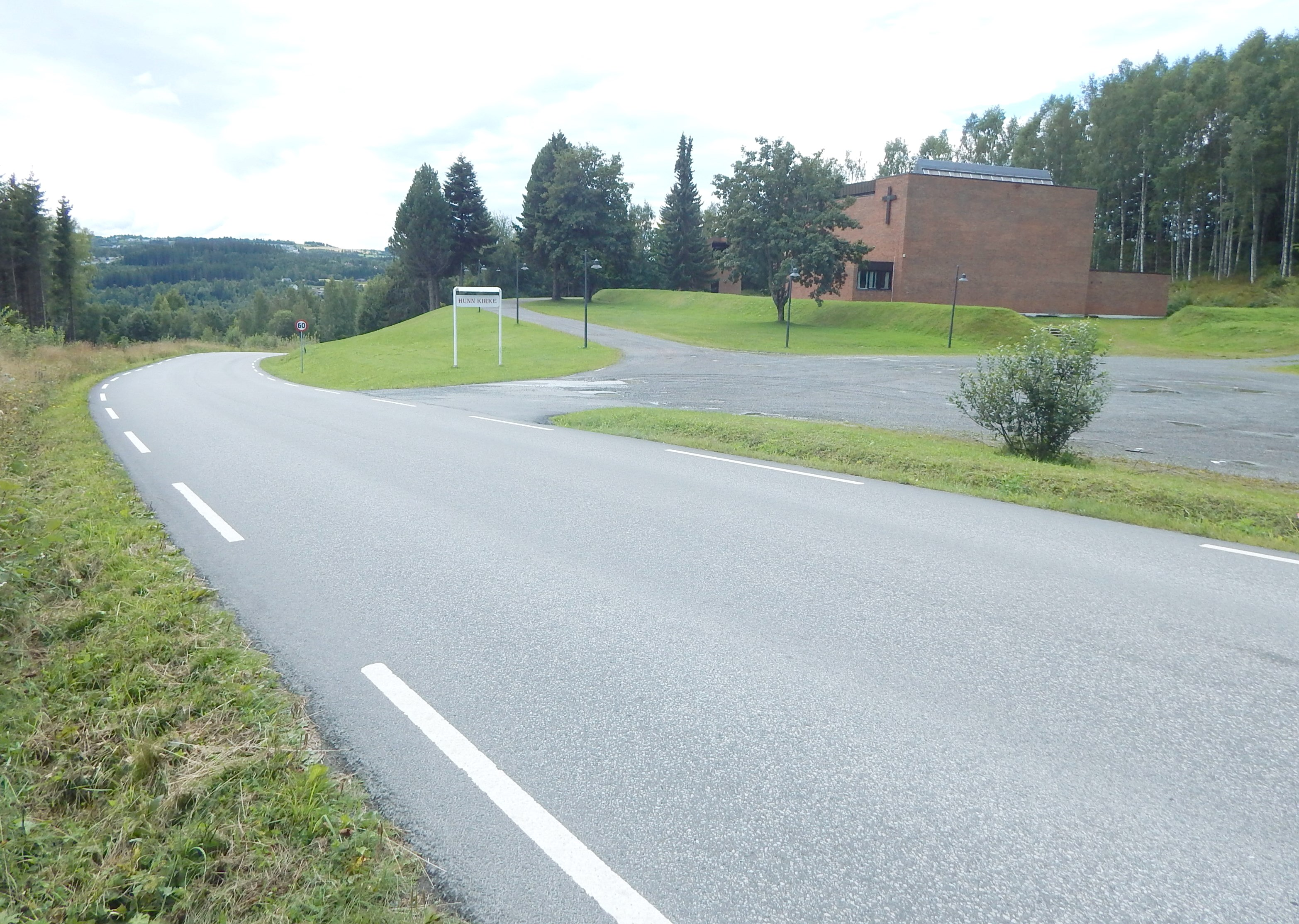

== See also ==
- List of churches in Hamar
