= Måndalen =

Village in Møre og Romsdal, Norway

Måndalen Voll
- Village
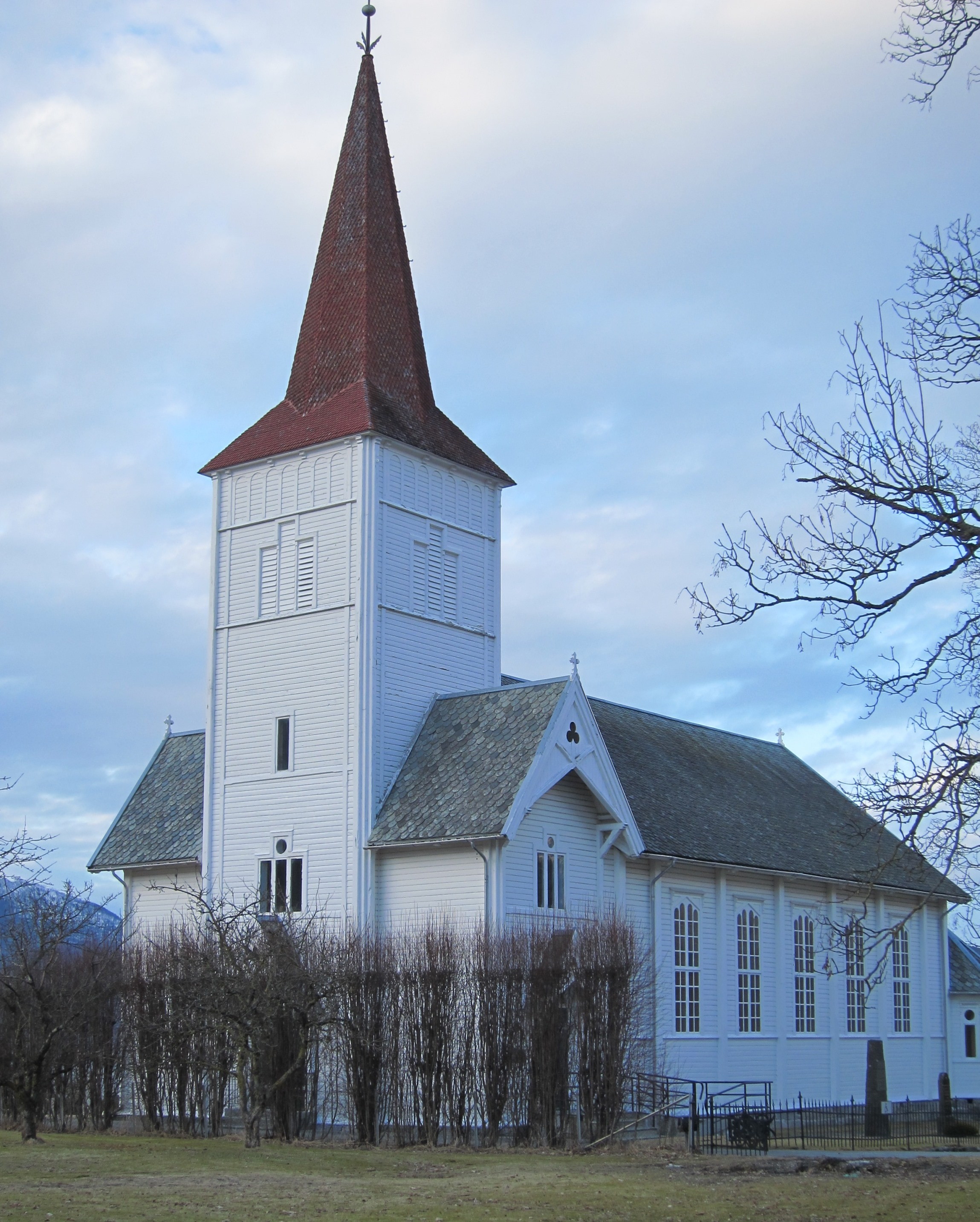
- View of the local church
- Interactive map of Måndalen
- Location within Møre og Romsdal Location within Norway
- Coordinates: 62.5347°N 7.4427°E
- Country: Norway
- Region: Western Norway
- County: Møre og Romsdal
- District: Romsdal
- Municipality: Rauma Municipality

Area
  - Total: 0.77 km^{2} (0.30 sq mi)
- Elevation: 3 m (9.8 ft)

Population (2024)
  - Total: 505
  - Density: 656/km^{2} (1,700/sq mi)
- Time zone: UTC+01:00 (CET)
  - Summer (DST): UTC+02:00 (CEST)
- Post Code: 6386 Måndalen

Måndalen or Voll is a village in Rauma Municipality in Møre og Romsdal county, Norway. The village is located along the Romsdalsfjorden about 20 kilometres (12 mi) west of the town of Åndalsnes. The European route E136 highway goes through the village, connecting it to the village of Vågstranda, about 10 kilometres (6.2 mi) to the north and to the village of Innfjorden, about 10 kilometres (6.2 mi) to the southeast.

The 0.77-square-kilometre (190-acre) village has a population (2024) of 505 and a population density of 656 inhabitants per square kilometre (1,700/sq mi). The central part of the village is often referred to as Voll while the larger area in the valley is known as Måndalen.

== History ==
Måndalen was the administrative centre of the old Voll Municipality which existed from 1874 until 1964. The historic Voll Church is located in this village, and it serves the people of western Rauma.
