= Vang Church (Hamar) =

Church in Hamar, Norway

- Vang kirke
- «Hedmarkskatedralen»
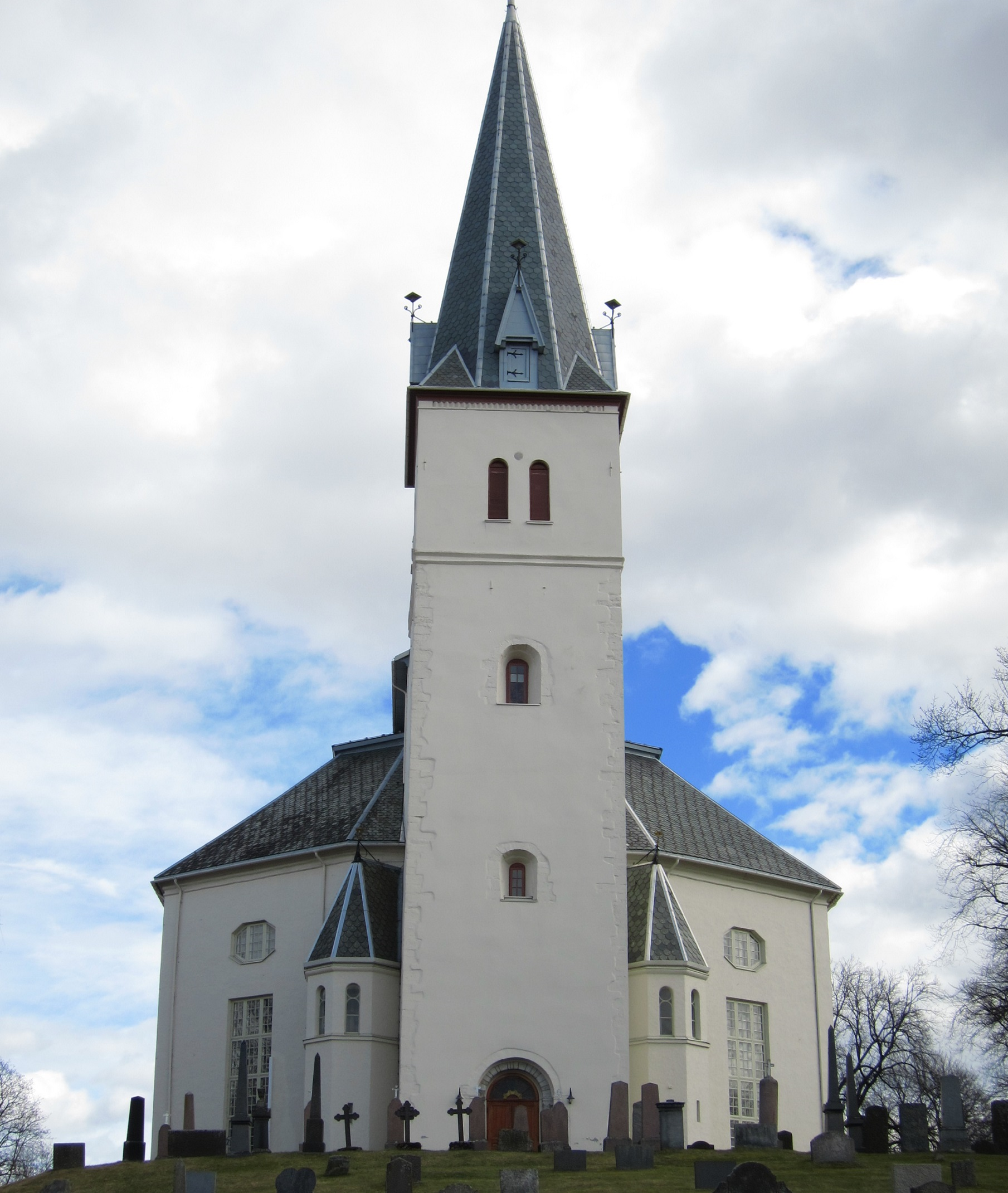
- View of the church
- Vang Church
- 60°48′09″N 11°07′57″E
- Location: Hamar Municipality, Innlandet
- Country: Norway
- Denomination: Church of Norway
- Previous denomination: Catholic Church
- Churchmanship: Evangelical Lutheran

History
- Status: Parish church
- Founded: c. 1200
- Consecrated: 30 November 1810

Architecture
- Functional status: Active
- Architect: Abraham Pihl
- Architectural type: Octagonal
- Completed: 1810 (216 years ago)

Specifications
- Capacity: 1,000
- Materials: Stone

Administration
- Diocese: Hamar bispedømme
- Deanery: Hamar domprosti
- Parish: Vang
- Norwegian Cultural Heritage Site
- Type: Church
- Status: Automatically protected
- ID: 85759

Vang Church (Norwegian: Vang kirke) is a parish church of the Church of Norway in Hamar Municipality in Innlandet county, Norway. It is located in the village of Ridabu. It is one of the churches for the Vang parish which is part of the Hamar domprosti (deanery) in the Diocese of Hamar. The white, stone church was built in a octagonal design in 1810 using plans drawn up by the architect Abraham Pihl. The church seats about 1,000 people.

== History ==
The first church in Vang was a Romanesque stone church that was built in the early 12th century. It was dedicated to St. Clement. Historically, the Hamar Cathedral was the main church for the area and Vang Church was an annex to that church. In 1567, the cathedral was destroyed and Vang Church became the main church for the parish. The original long church design was enlarged in 1675 when a wing was added on the north side of the nave. In 1693, another wing was built on the south side of the nave. Also that year, the old wooden church porch was torn down and replaced with a larger stone porch. Stone for the expansion of the church was partly taken from the Hamar Cathedral ruins.

A few hours after the worship service on 8 July 1804, lightning struck in one of the small decorative spires at the top of the tower, and the fire spread rapidly to the tarred main spire and roof. The church burned down in a few hours, but the altar silver and pictures as well as some ornaments were saved. Parish priest Abraham Pihl was given the task of designing and building a new church. He received help in the work by the builder Svend Aspaas. The new church had an octagonal design and a large tower on the west end (the tower structure may have been reused from the previous building). Construction work began in August 1805. It was the parish priest of the place, Abraham Pihl, who designed the church, and who was partly responsible for the construction management. The builder Svend Aspaas (then 70 years old) from Røros took over the construction management in 1806 when Pihl was busy managing his task as an astronomical observer. Construction work was delayed by the war with Sweden in 1808, and then Pihl and Aspaas collaborated on the completion after the war. The new church was completed and put into use starting on 22 April 1810, although it was not formally consecrated until 30 November 1810.

In 1814, this church served as an election church (Norwegian: valgkirke). Together with more than 300 other parish churches across Norway, it was a polling station for elections to the 1814 Norwegian Constituent Assembly which wrote the Constitution of Norway. This was Norway's first national elections. Each church parish was a constituency that elected people called "electors" who later met together in each county to elect the representatives for the assembly that was to meet at Eidsvoll Manor later that year.

In 1877, the church was rebuilt under the direction of Paul Due. On that occasion, the east wall was knocked out and a new choir was added as an extension. The chancel opening was given a Gothic pointed arch, but it was later changed to a round arch. At the same time, a new tower and sacristy was built. In 1879, Eilif Peterssen painted a new altarpiece for the church, and it is still used in today's altarpiece.

== Media gallery ==
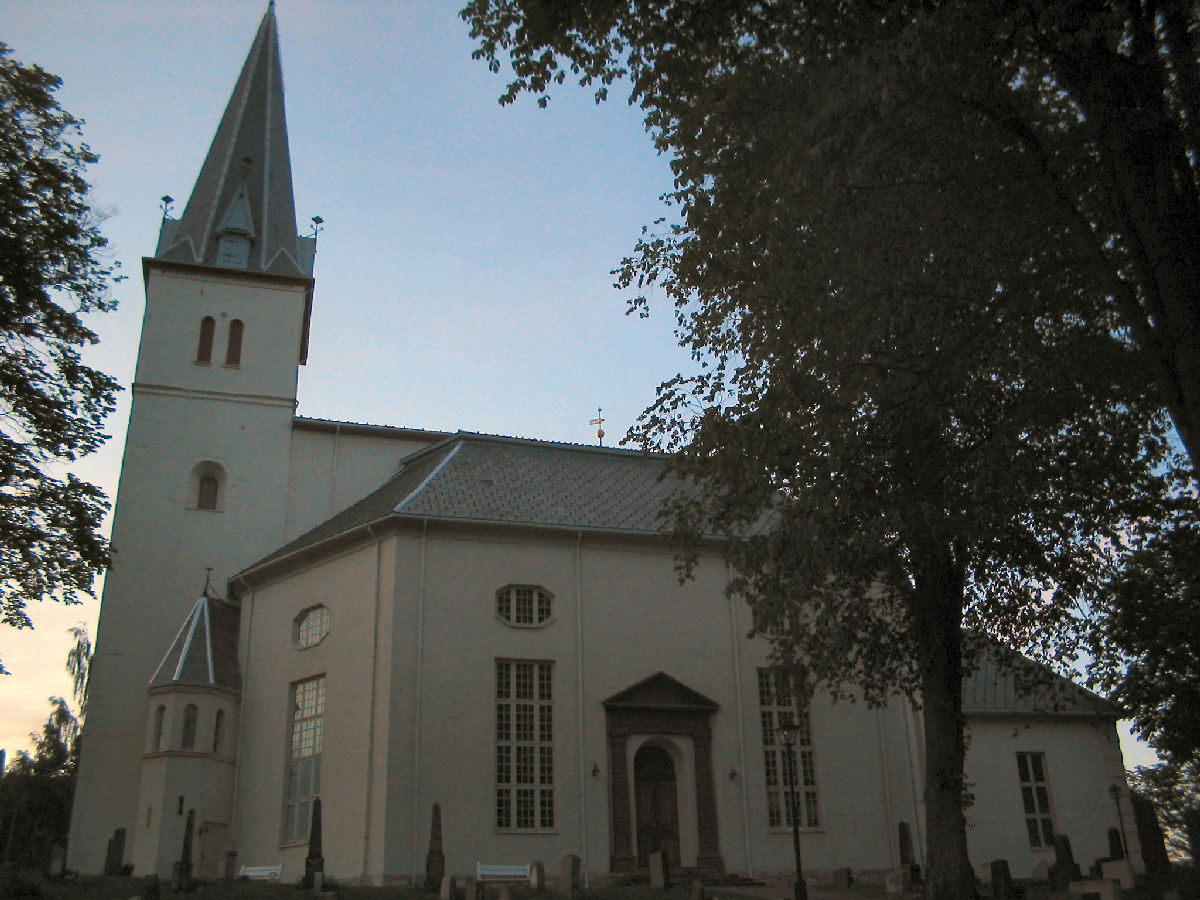

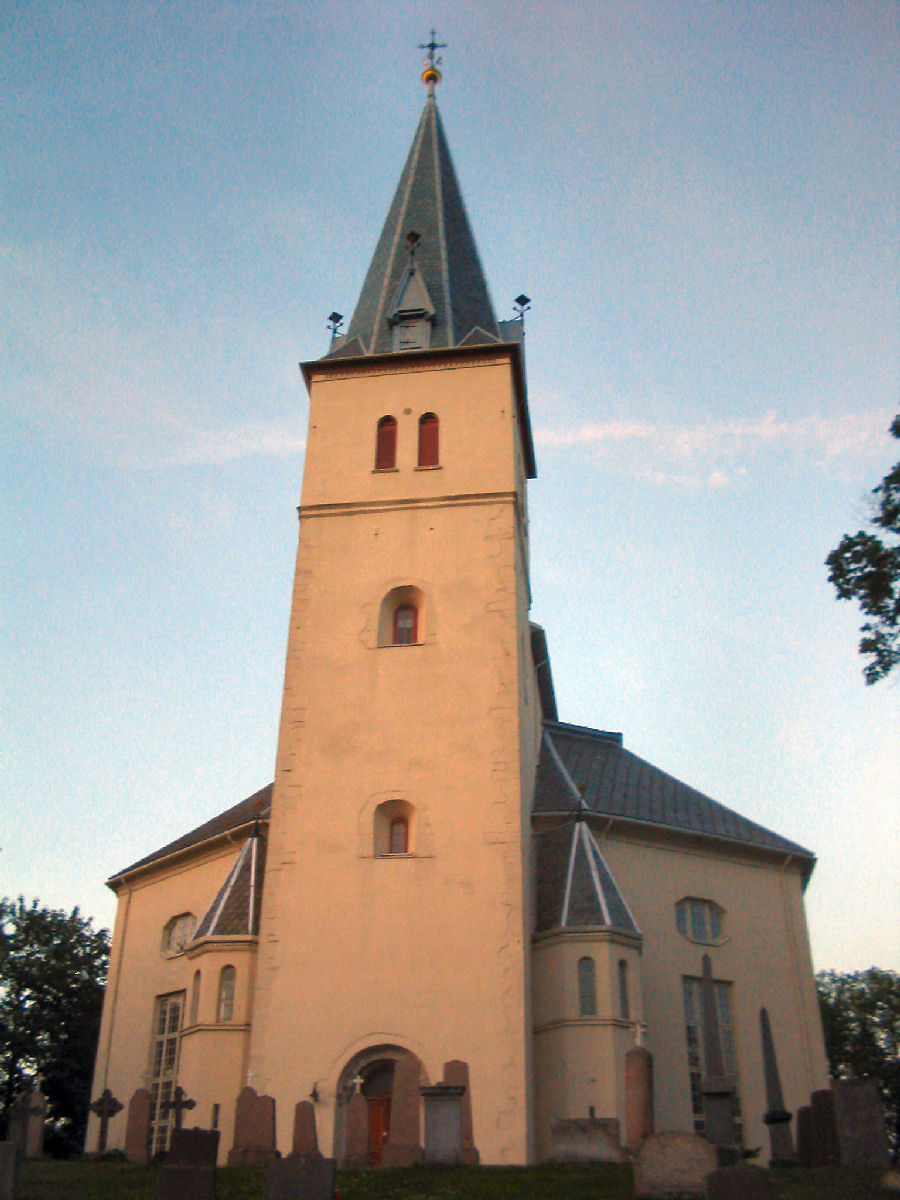

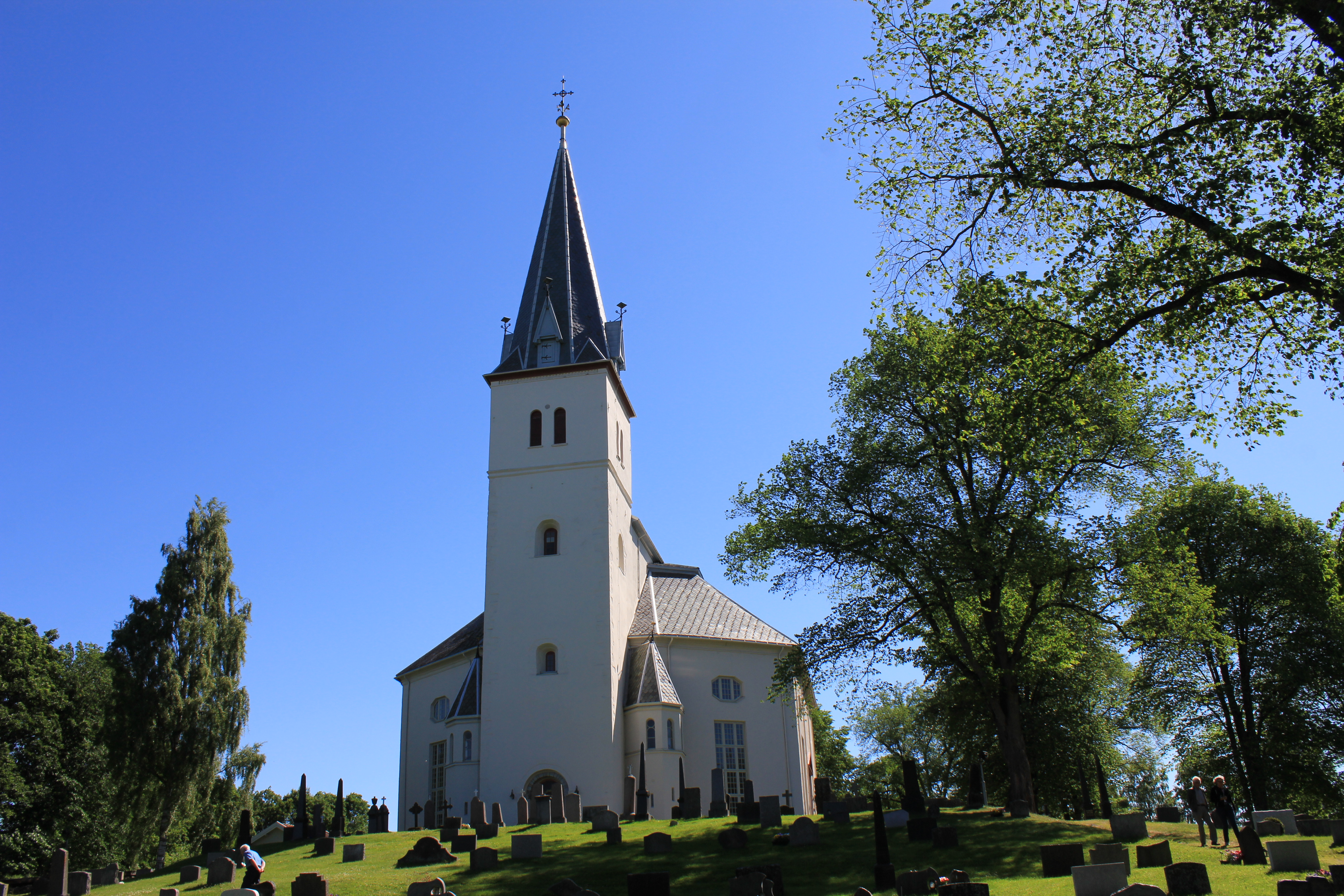

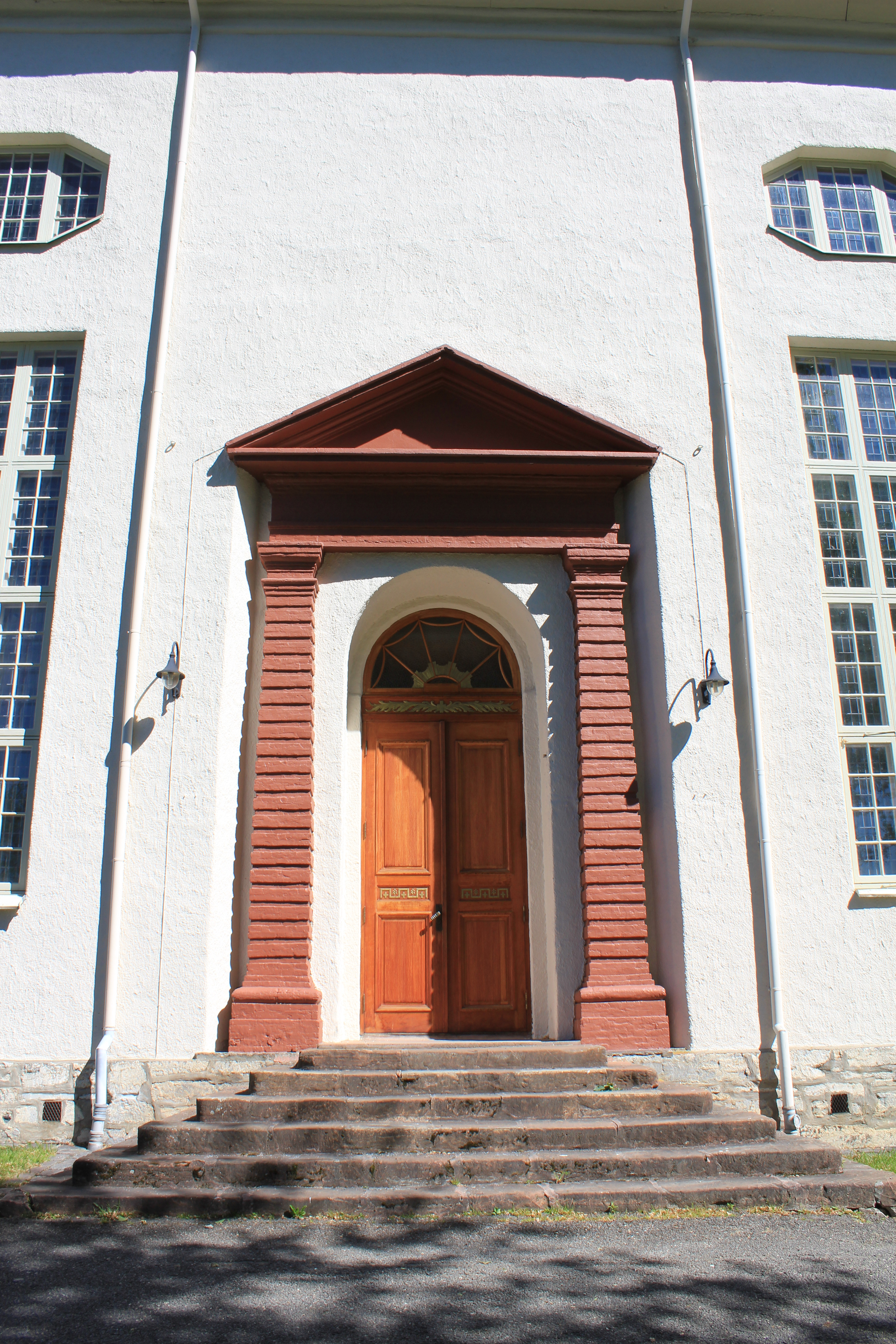

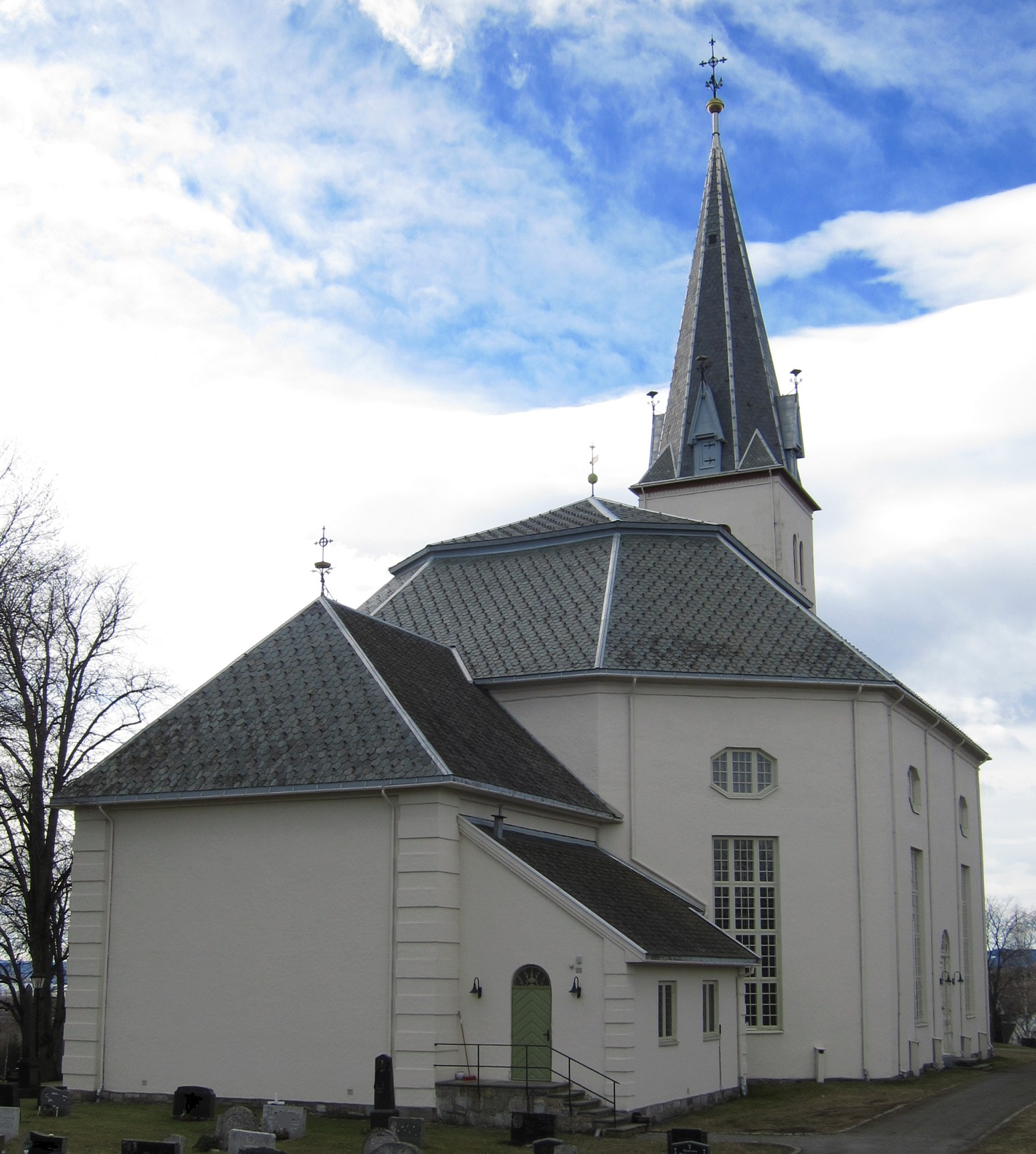

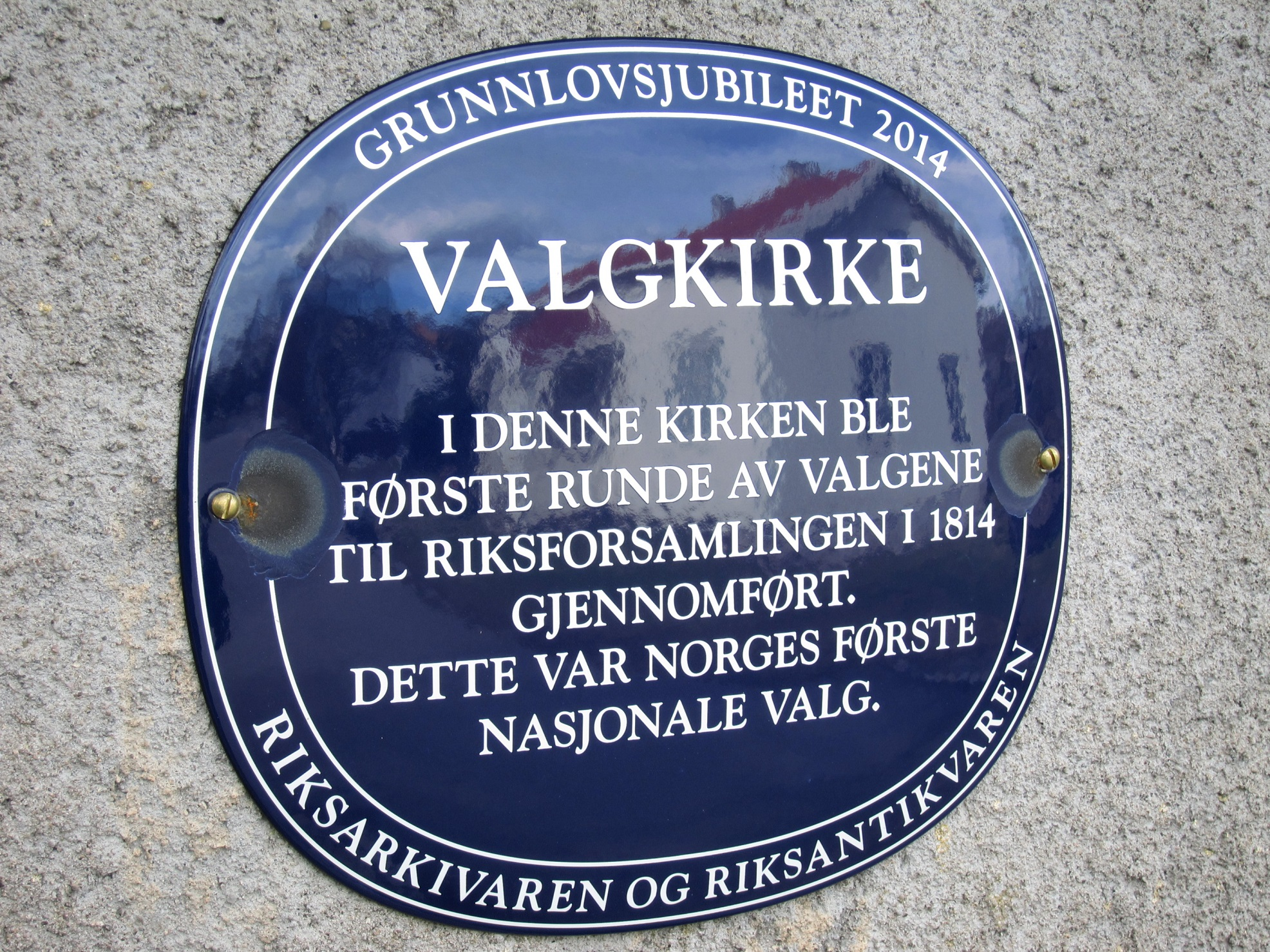

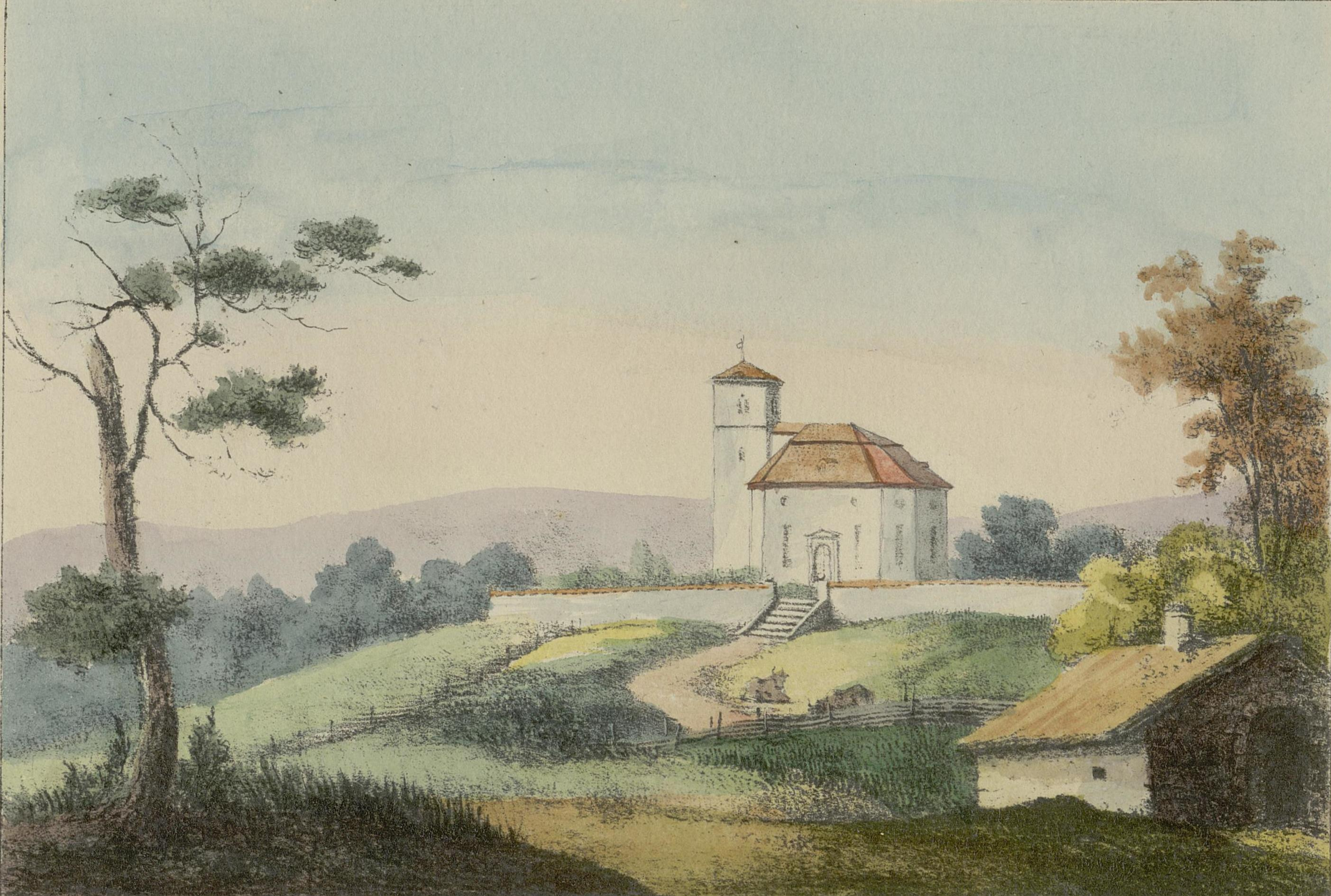
View of the church (c. 1830)

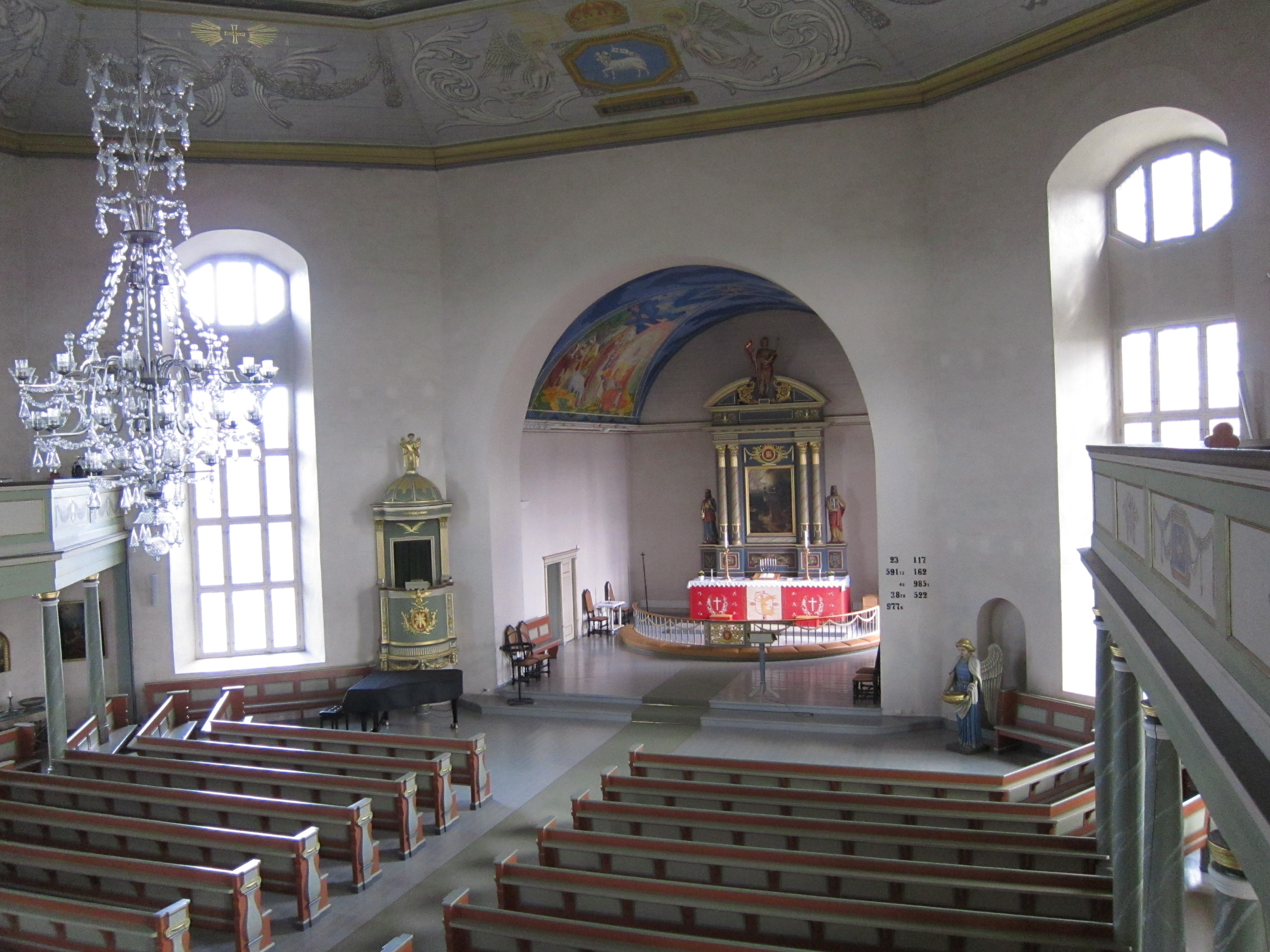

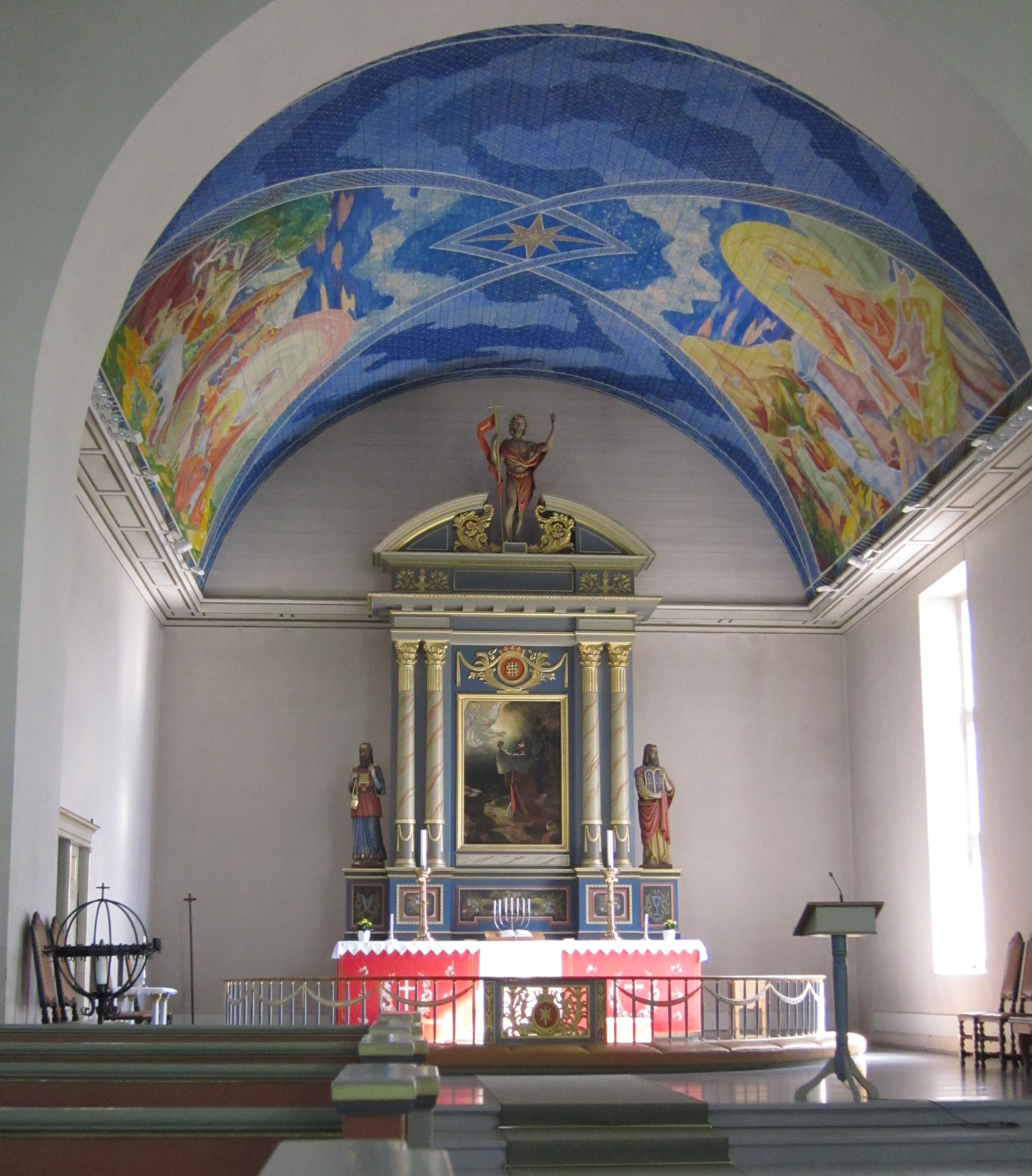

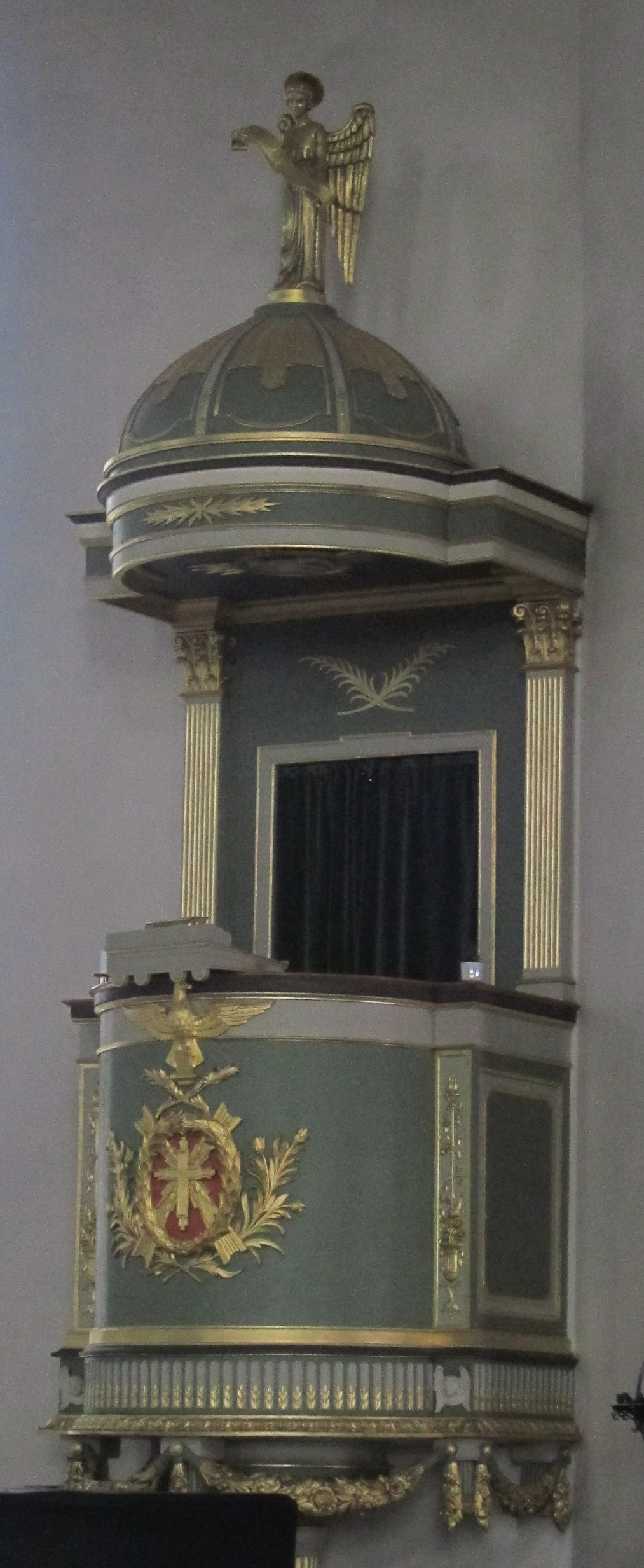

== See also ==
- List of churches in Hamar
