= Bråstad Church =

Church in Innlandet, Norway

- Bråstad kirke
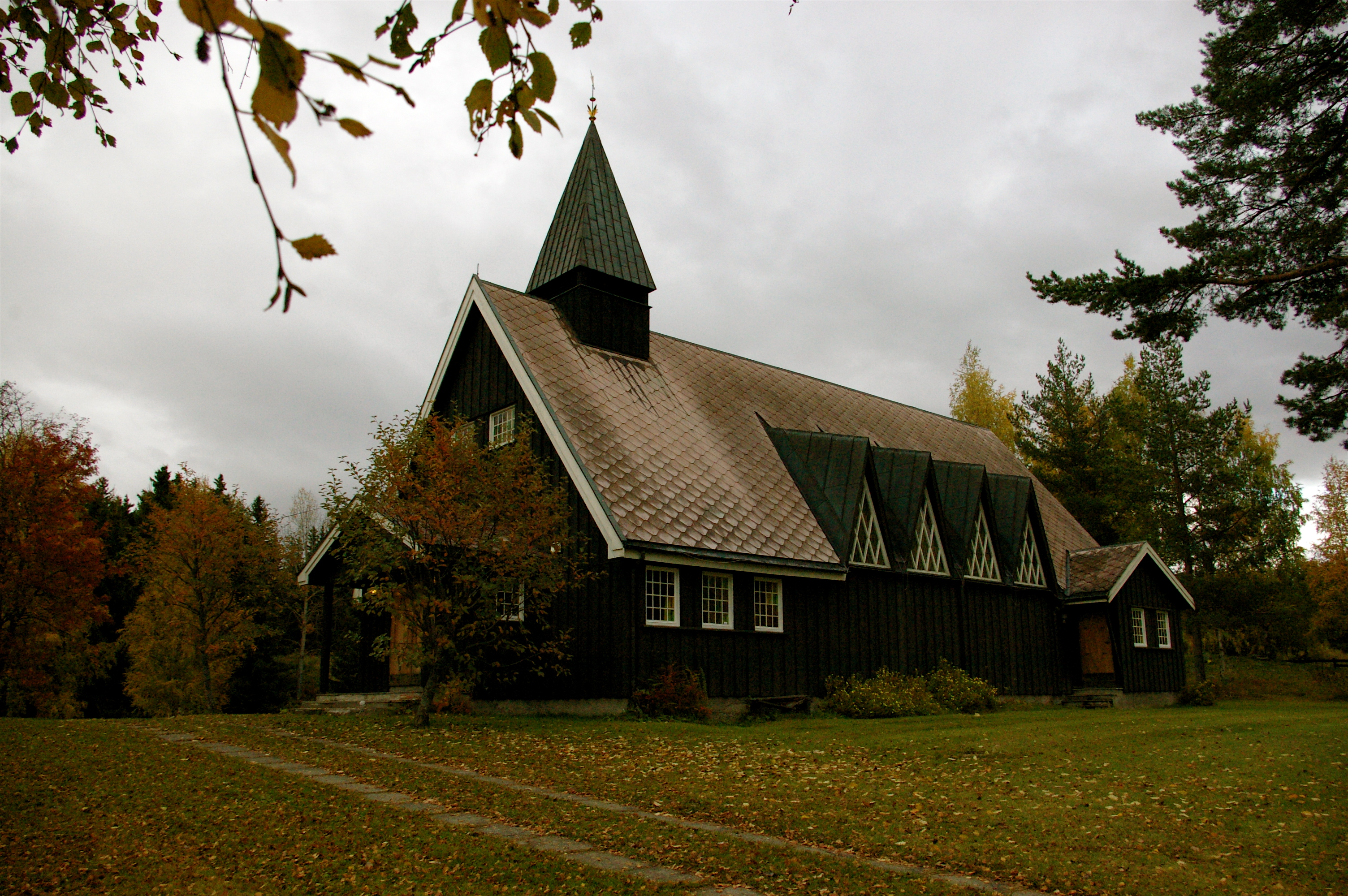
- View of the church
- Bråstad Church
- 60°50′38″N 10°39′41″E
- Location: Gjøvik Municipality, Innlandet
- Country: Norway
- Denomination: Church of Norway
- Previous denomination: Catholic Church
- Churchmanship: Evangelical Lutheran

History
- Former name: Bråstad kapell
- Status: Parish church
- Founded: 13th century
- Consecrated: 29 December 1963

Architecture
- Functional status: Active
- Architect: Per Nordan
- Architectural type: Long church
- Completed: 1963 (63 years ago)
- Closed: 1821-1963

Specifications
- Capacity: 200
- Materials: Wood

Administration
- Diocese: Hamar bispedømme
- Deanery: Toten prosti
- Parish: Bråstad

Bråstad Church (Norwegian: Bråstad kirke) is a parish church of the Church of Norway in Gjøvik Municipality in Innlandet county, Norway. It is located in the village of Bråstad. It is the church for the Bråstad parish which is part of the Toten prosti (deanery) in the Diocese of Hamar. The brown, wooden church was built in a long church design in 1963 using plans drawn up by the architect Per Nordan. The church seats about 200 people.

== History ==
The earliest existing historical records of the church date back to the year 1365, but the church was not built that year. The first church in Bråstad was a wooden stave church that was likely built during the 13th century. This church was built on a site about 1.2 kilometres (0.75 mi) to the southeast of the present church site. Historically, the name was spelled Brodstadt. In 1664, the old church was torn down and a new timber-framed long church was built on the same site. Some of the interior furnishings from the old church were reused in the new church, including the pulpit. In 1694, a new sacristy was constructed on the north side of the chancel. In the early 1800s, the parish decided to close down the Bråstad Church and the Old Hunn Church and to replace both of them with a new Gjøvik Church which would be built a short distance away in a new location inside the borders of the growing town. In 1821, the new church opened and soon afterwards, the old Bråstad Church was closed and torn down.

During World War II, the people of the Bråstad area began pushing for a chapel to be built in their area once again. Land was donated by Sverre Braastad for the purposes of building a chapel and graveyard. The new chapel was designed by architect Per Nordan. The new Bråstad Chapel (as it was originally titled) was consecrated on 29 December 1963 by Bishop Kristian Schjelderup. Today, the building is a parish church so it is now titled as a church rather than a chapel.

== See also ==
- List of churches in Hamar
