= Innfjorden =

Village in Rauma Municipality, Norway

- Village
- Interactive map of Innfjorden
- Location within Møre og Romsdal Location within Norway
- Coordinates: 62.4975°N 7.5645°E
- Country: Norway
- Region: Western Norway
- County: Møre og Romsdal
- District: Romsdal
- Municipality: Rauma Municipality

Area
  - Total: 0.28 km^{2} (0.11 sq mi)
- Elevation: 2 m (6.6 ft)

Population (2022)
  - Total: 260
  - Density: 929/km^{2} (2,410/sq mi)
- Time zone: UTC+01:00 (CET)
  - Summer (DST): UTC+02:00 (CEST)
- Post Code: 6315 Innfjorden

Innfjorden is a village in Rauma Municipality in Møre og Romsdal county, Norway. It is situated about 10 kilometres (6.2 mi) southwest of the town of Åndalsnes and 9 kilometres (5.6 mi) southeast of the village of Måndalen along the European Route E136 highway. The road from Åndalsnes to Innfjorden goes through the 6,594-metre (21,634 ft) long Innfjord Tunnel, which opened in 1991 after a series of deaths caused by avalanches on the former road along the shore of Romsdal Fjord.

The 0.28-square-kilometre (69-acre) village had a population (2022) of 260 and a population density of 929 inhabitants per square kilometre (2,410/sq mi). Since 2022, the population and area data for this village area has not been separately tracked by Statistics Norway. The local economy is mainly based on agriculture, while there is some industry and a few service companies relating to tourism, transportation, and road safety. In addition there is an elementary school, kindergarten, and the small Innfjorden Chapel.

Surrounding Innfjorden are 1,200-to-1,800-metre (3,900 to 5,900 ft) tall peaks on the east, south, and west sides with Romsdal Fjord to the north. The area is frequented by mountain hikers and lately a lot of BASE jumpers have discovered the mountains around Innfjorden.
