= Voll Church =

Church in Møre og Romsdal, Norway

- Voll kyrkje
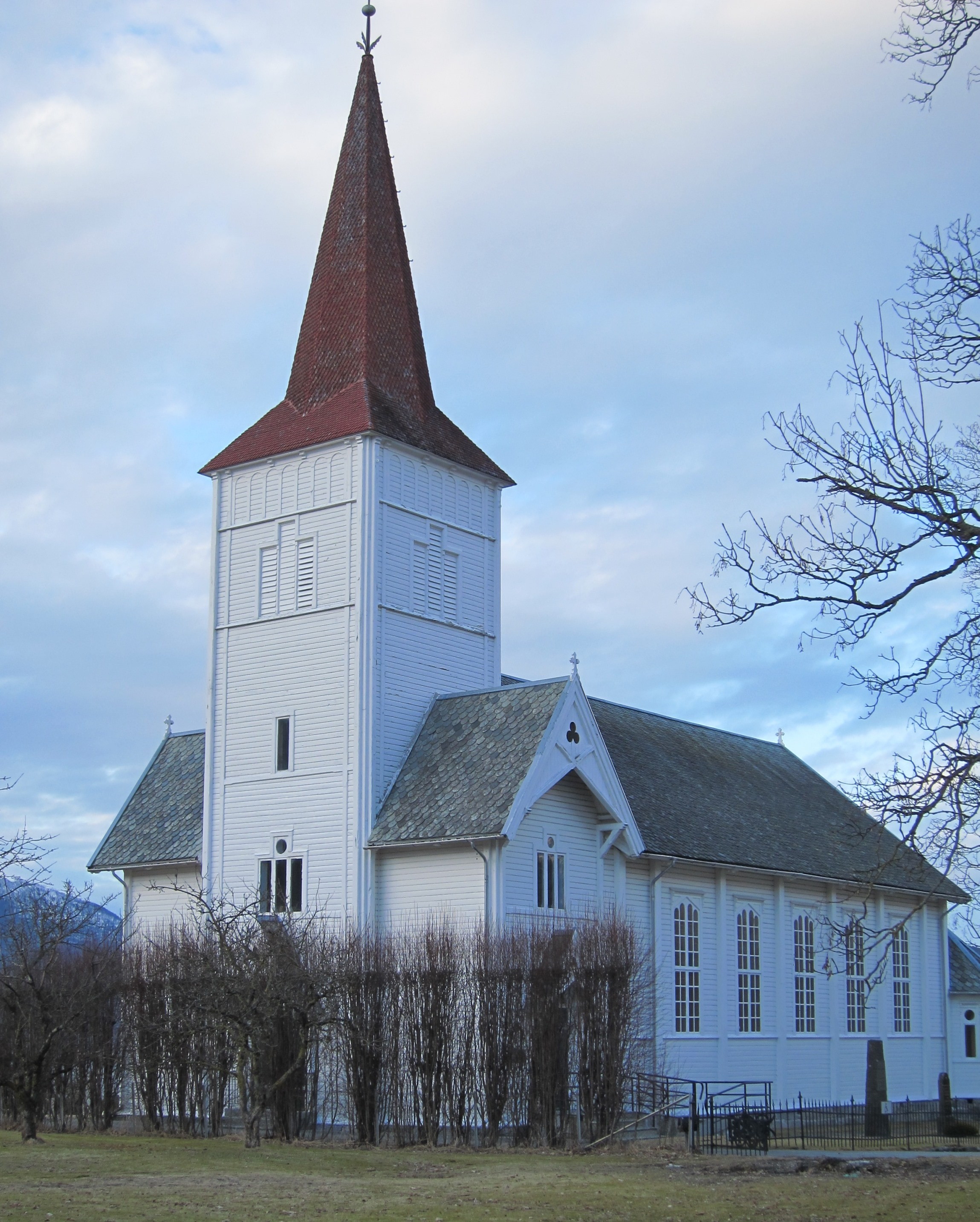
- View of the church
- Voll Church
- 62°31′58″N 7°26′39″E
- Location: Rauma Municipality, Møre og Romsdal
- Country: Norway
- Denomination: Church of Norway
- Churchmanship: Evangelical Lutheran

History
- Status: Parish church
- Founded: 14th century
- Consecrated: 1896

Architecture
- Functional status: Active
- Architect: Gabriel Smith
- Architectural type: Long church
- Completed: 1896 (130 years ago)

Specifications
- Capacity: 290
- Materials: Wood

Administration
- Diocese: Møre bispedømme
- Deanery: Indre Romsdal prosti
- Parish: Voll
- Norwegian Cultural Heritage Site
- Type: Church
- Status: Listed
- ID: 85866

Voll Church (Norwegian: Voll kyrkje) is a parish church of the Church of Norway in Rauma Municipality in Møre og Romsdal county, Norway. It is located in the village of Voll in the Måndalen valley. It is the church for the Voll parish which is part of the Indre Romsdal prosti (deanery) in the Diocese of Møre. The white, wooden church was built in a long church design in 1896 using plans drawn up by the architect Gabriel Smith from Ålesund. The church seats about 290 people, making it the largest church in Rauma.

== History ==
The earliest existing historical records of the church date back to 1432, but it was not new that year. The first church in Voll was likely a stave church that was built in the 14th century. In 1673-1674 the old church was torn down and a new timber-framed, cruciform church was constructed on the same site. The east–west wings measured to be 15.6-metre (51 ft) long and the north–south wings had the same length. There was a sacristy on the end of the east wing and a church porch on the end of the west wing.

In 1814, this church served as an election church (Norwegian: valgkirke). Together with more than 300 other parish churches across Norway, it was a polling station for elections to the 1814 Norwegian Constituent Assembly which wrote the Constitution of Norway. This was Norway's first national elections. Each church parish was a constituency that elected people called "electors" who later met together in each county to elect the representatives for the assembly that was to meet at Eidsvoll Manor later that year.

In the spring of 1895, the old church was torn down. Construction of a new church on the same site began right away and in 1896 the church was completed. The new church has a rectangular nave with a choir that has a nearly semi-circular apse on the eastern end. There were two sacristies on either side of the choir. There is a large steeple on the western end of the building above the church porch. The church was restored and renovated in 1964.

== Media gallery ==
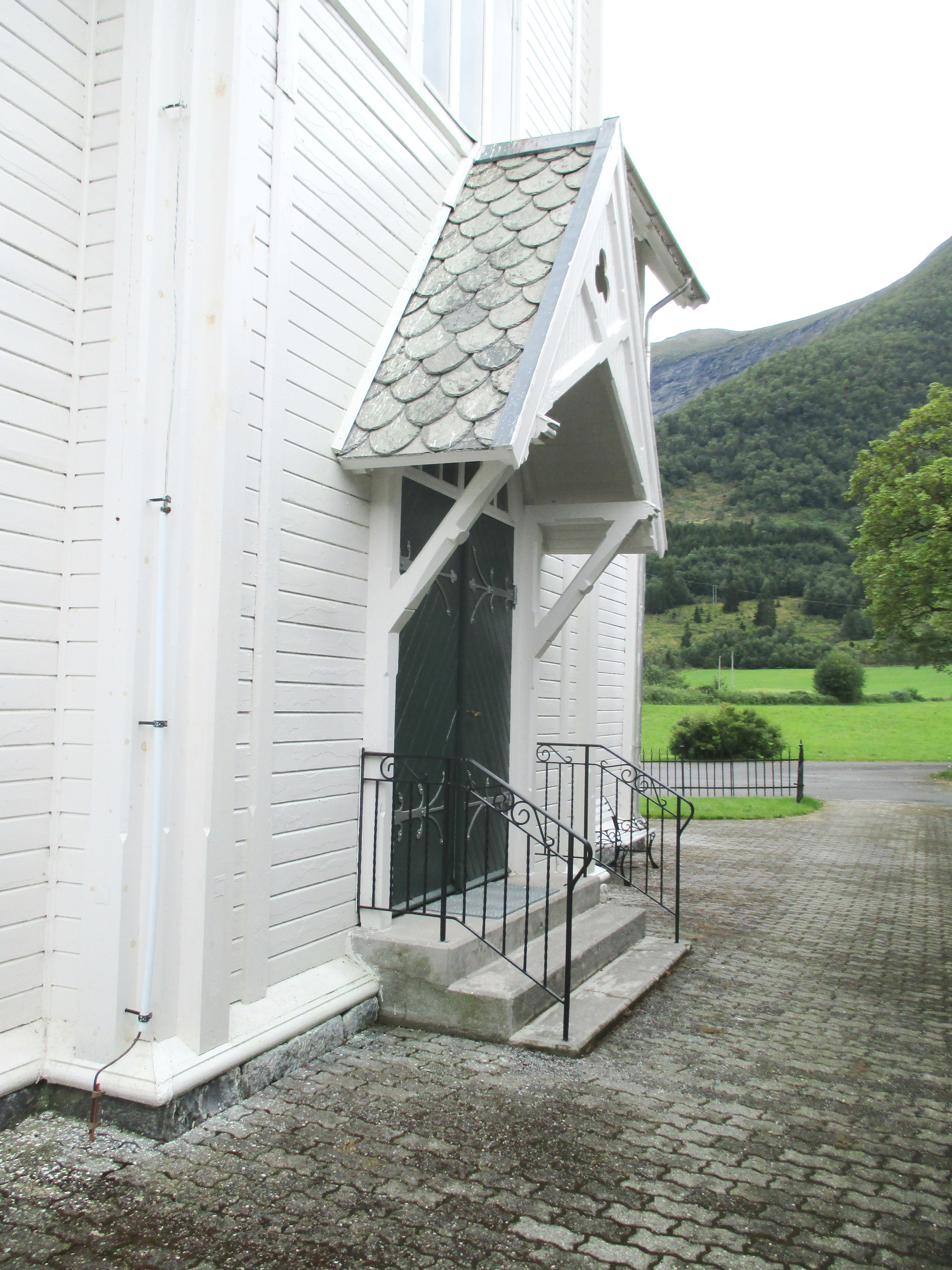

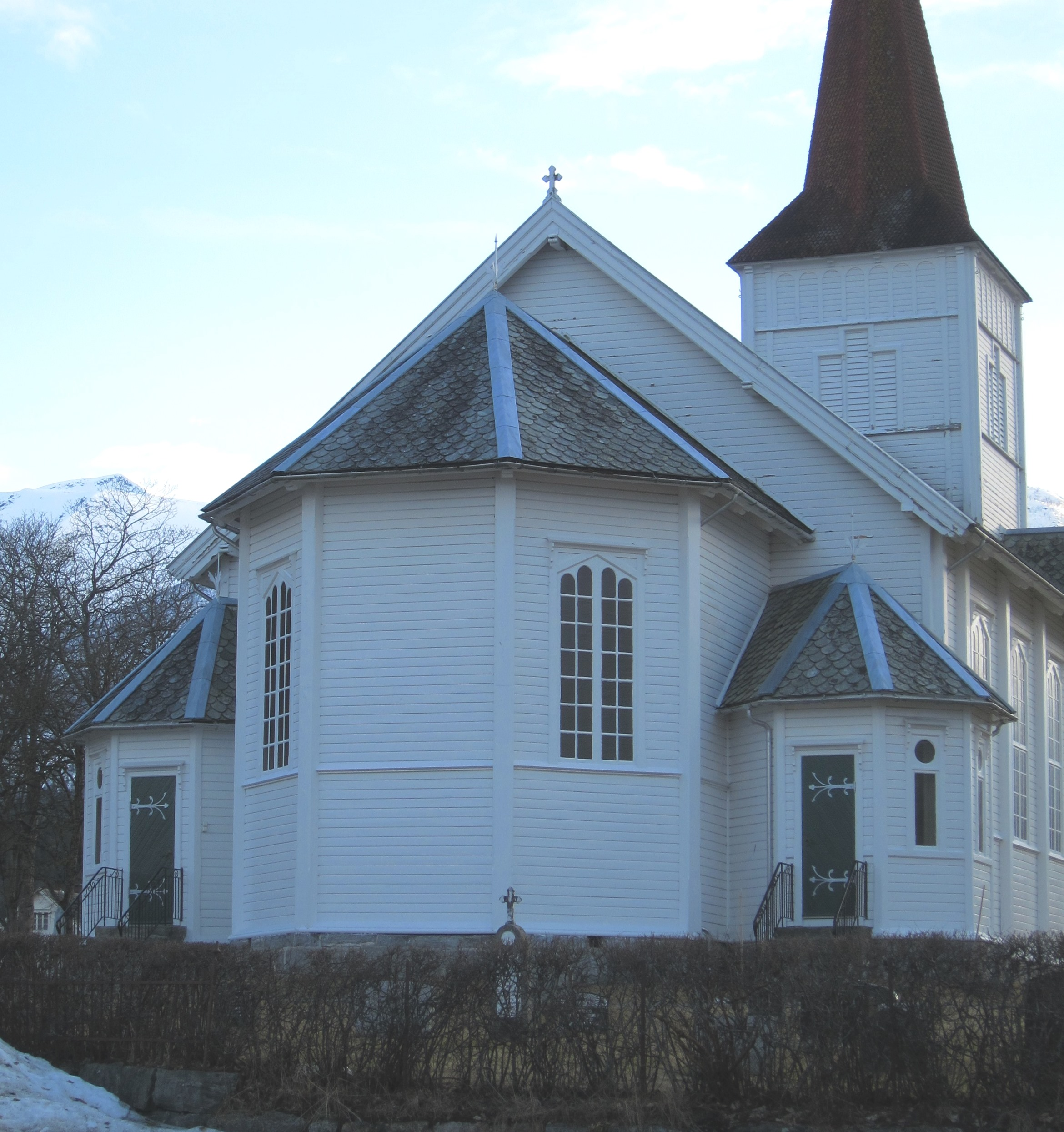

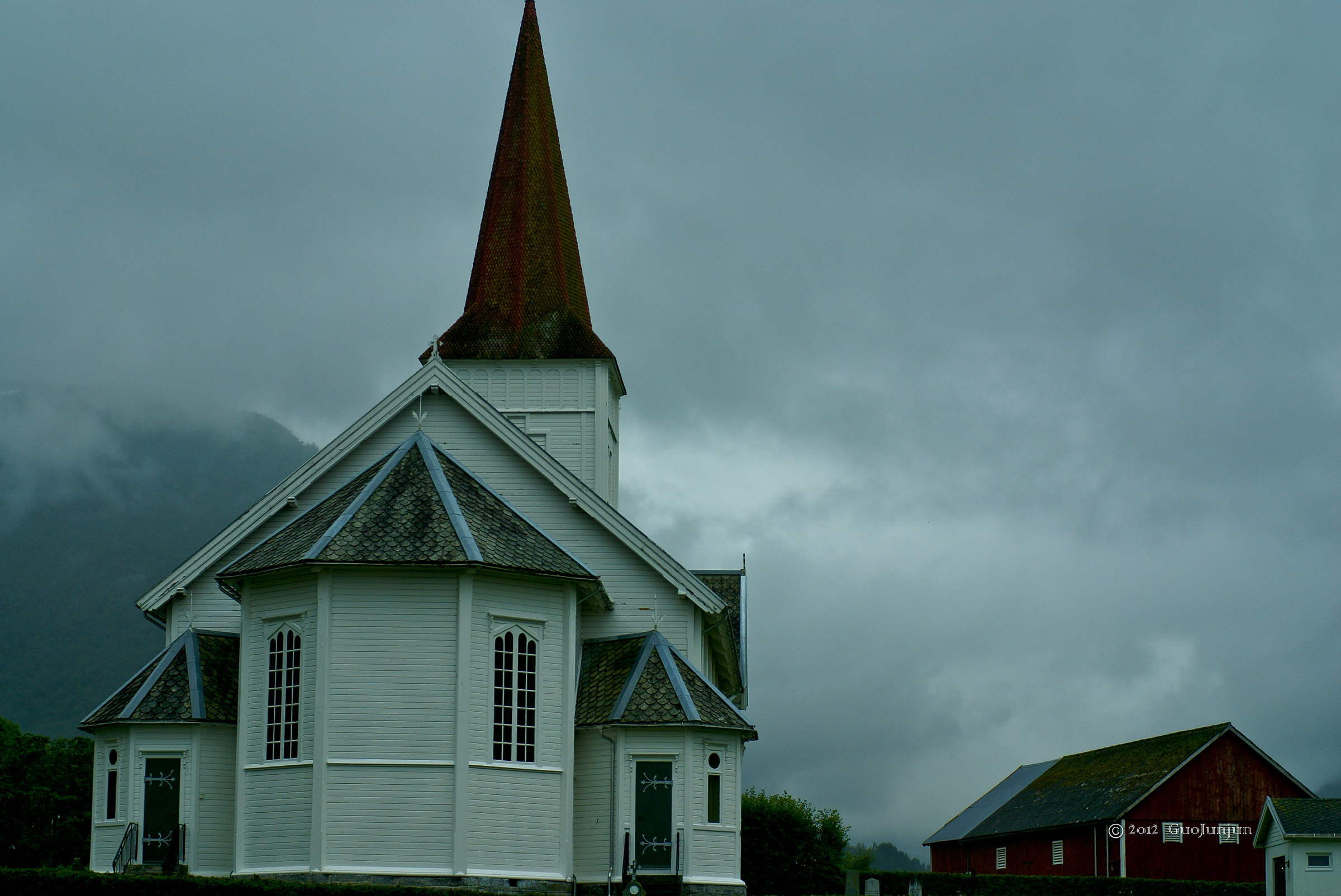

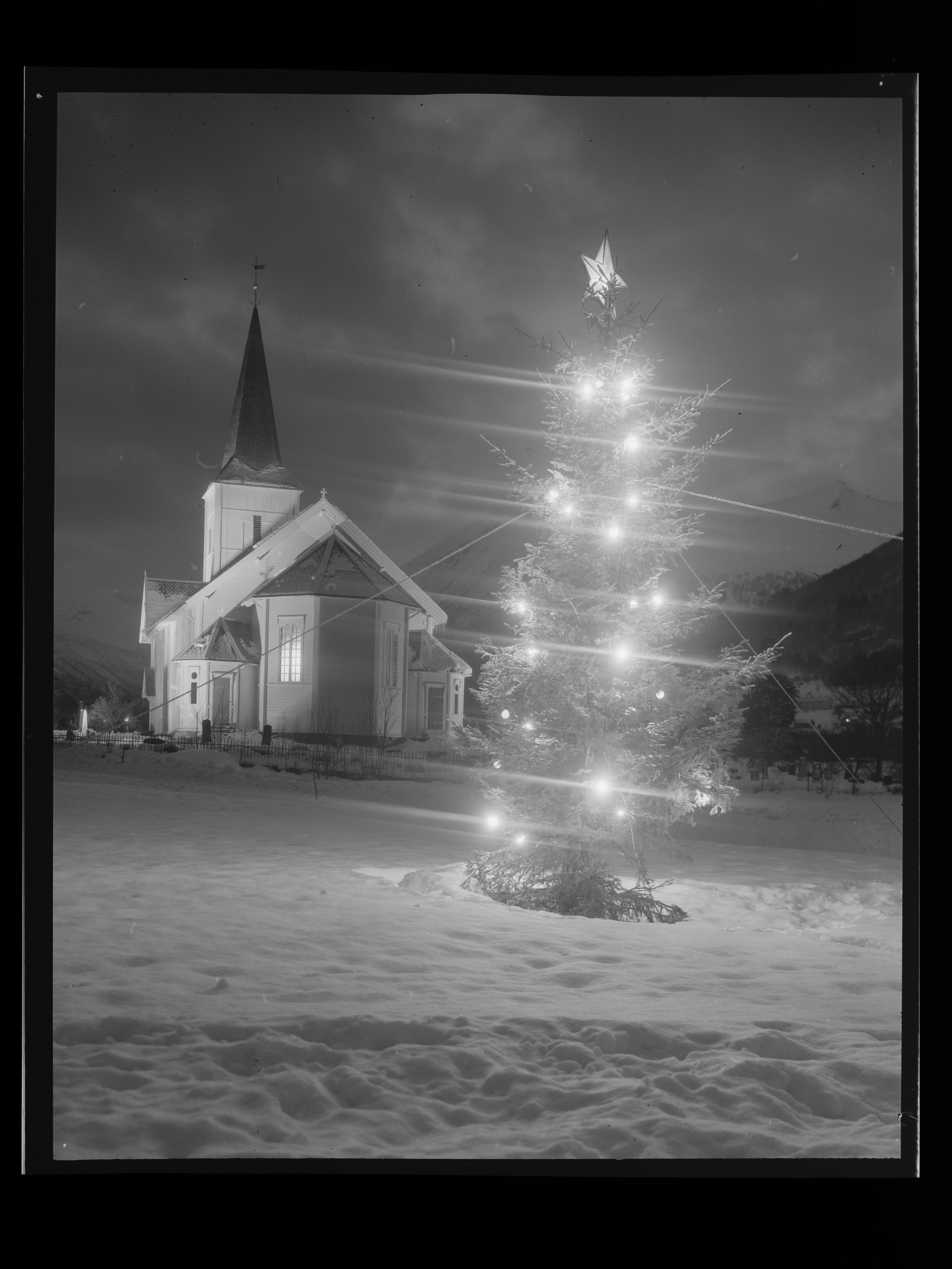

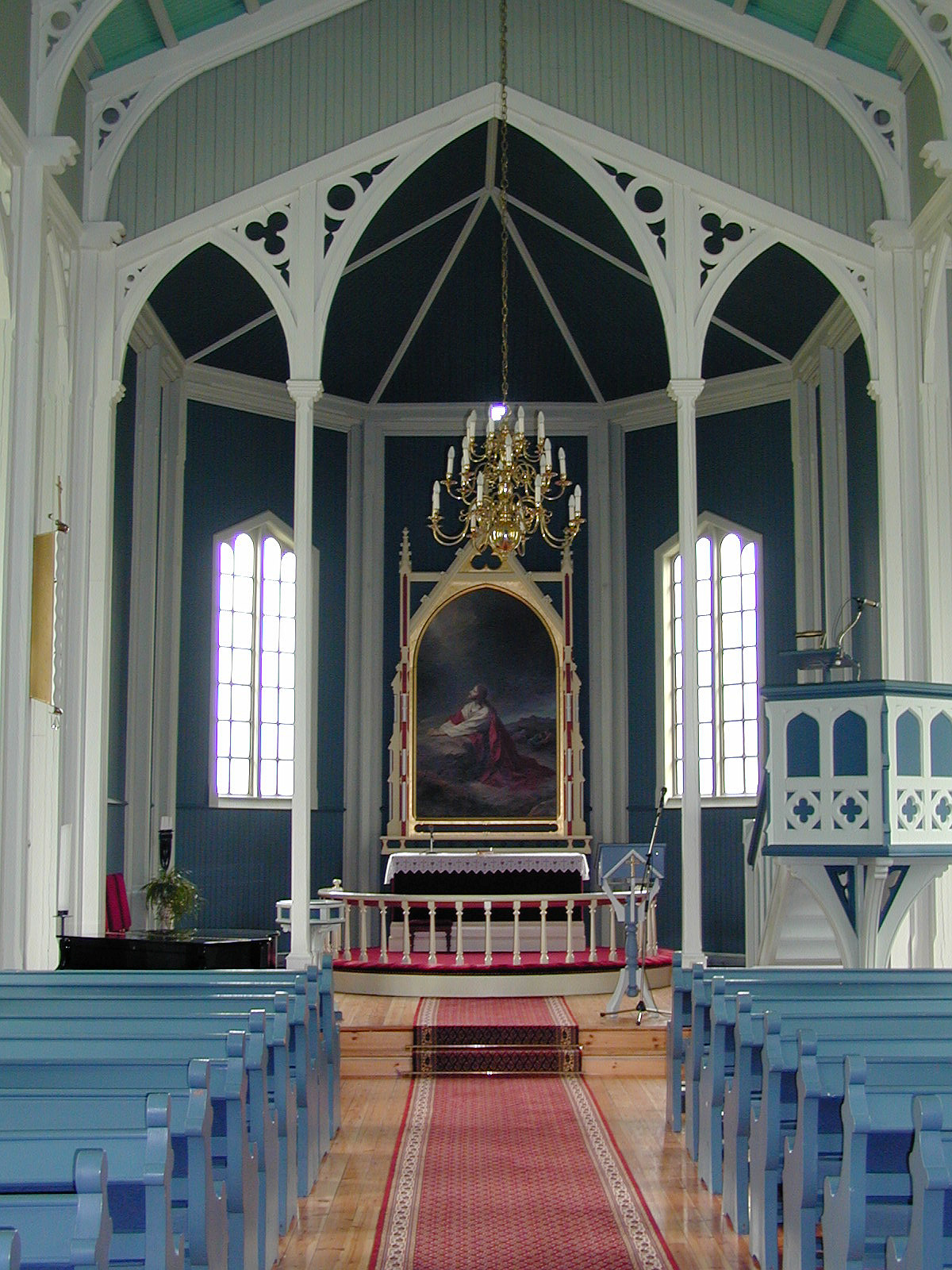

== See also ==
- List of churches in Møre
