= Innfjord Tunnel =

Road tunnel in Rauma, Norway

Innfjord Tunnel Innfjordtunnelen
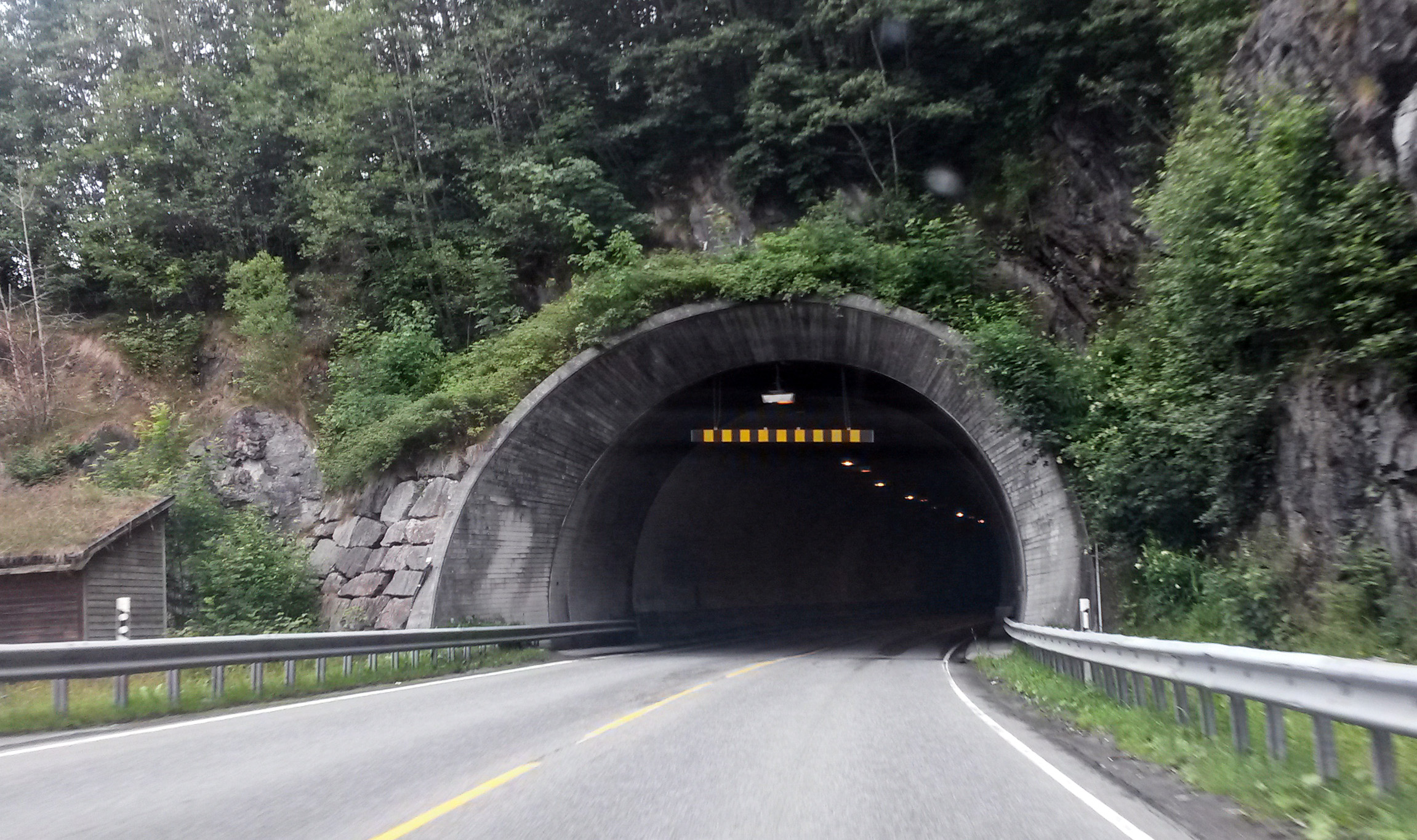
- Interactive map of Innfjord Tunnel; Innfjordtunnelen

Overview
- Location: Møre og Romsdal, Norway
- Coordinates: 62°31′54″N 7°36′59″E
- Route: E136
- Start: Innfjorden
- End: Veblungsnes

Operation
- Work began: 1989
- Opened: 1991
- Traffic: Automotive
- Toll: No
- Vehicles per day: 1,750

Technical
- Length: 6,594 metres (4.1 mi)
- No. of lanes: 2
- Width: 6.5 metres (21 ft)

The Innfjord Tunnel (Norwegian: Innfjordtunnelen) is a 6,594-metre (4.1 mi) long road tunnel in Rauma Municipality in Møre og Romsdal county, Norway. The tunnel goes between the Gridset farm on the north side of the village of Innfjorden and the large village of Veblungsnes, near the mouth of the Rauma River. The tunnel is part of the European Route E136 highway.

The tunnel opened in 1991 and replaced a narrow and curvy section of the E136 highway that used to follow the shore of the Romsdalsfjorden. The old road was closed in 1989 after a landslide killed one person. During 2-year the construction of the tunnel, there was a temporary ferry service from Åndalsnes to Innfjorden.
