= Abraham Pihl =

Norwegian clergyman, astronomer, and architect

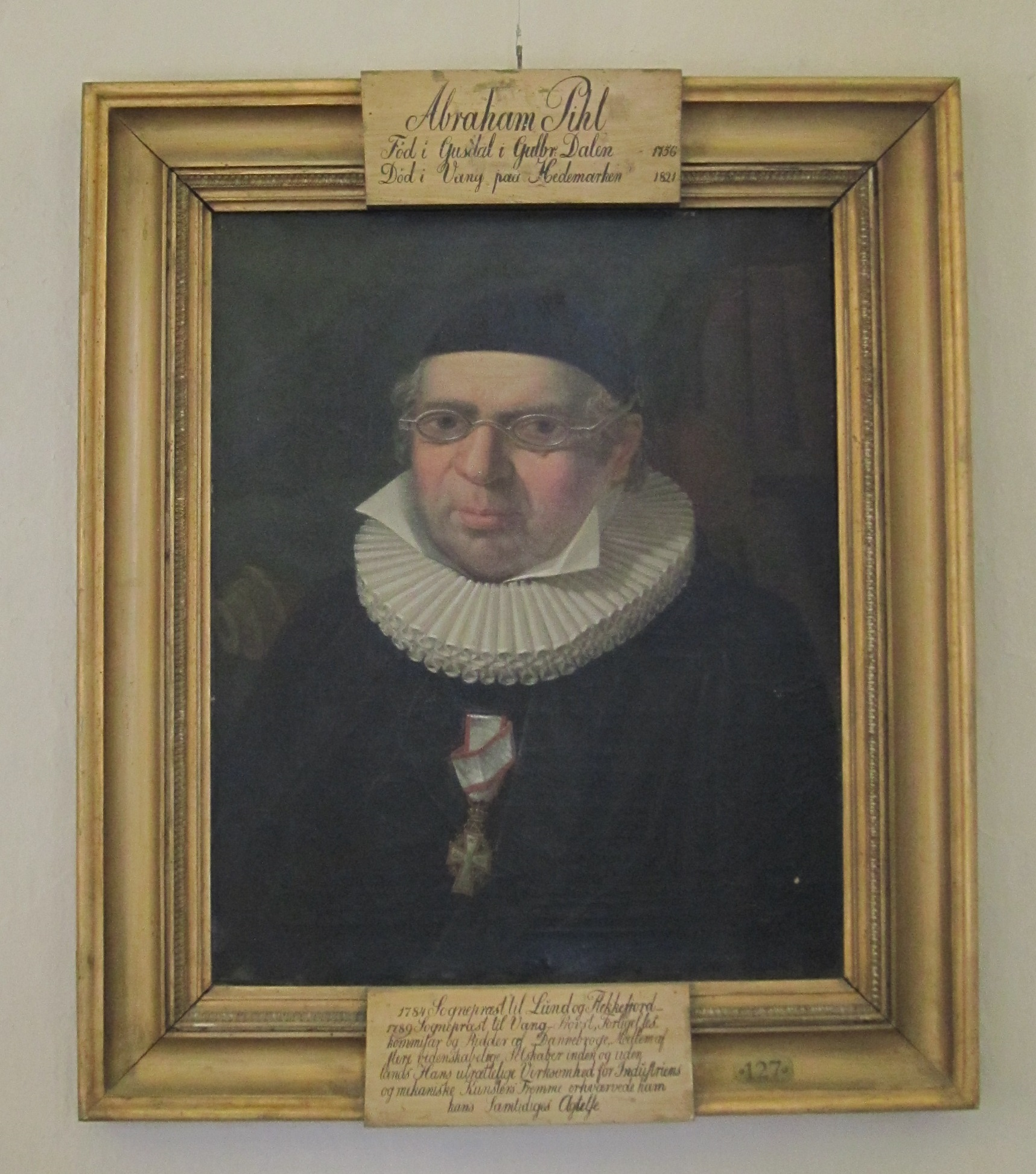
- Abraham Pihl (portrait in his church) by Johannes Flintoe
- Born: 3 October 1756; Gausdal, Norway
- Died: 20 May 1821 (aged 64)
- Occupations: priest, architect, astronomer, watchmaker
- Notable work: Vang church at Ridabu

Abraham Pihl (3 October 1756 – 20 May 1821) was a Norwegian clergyman, astronomer, and architect.

== Biography ==
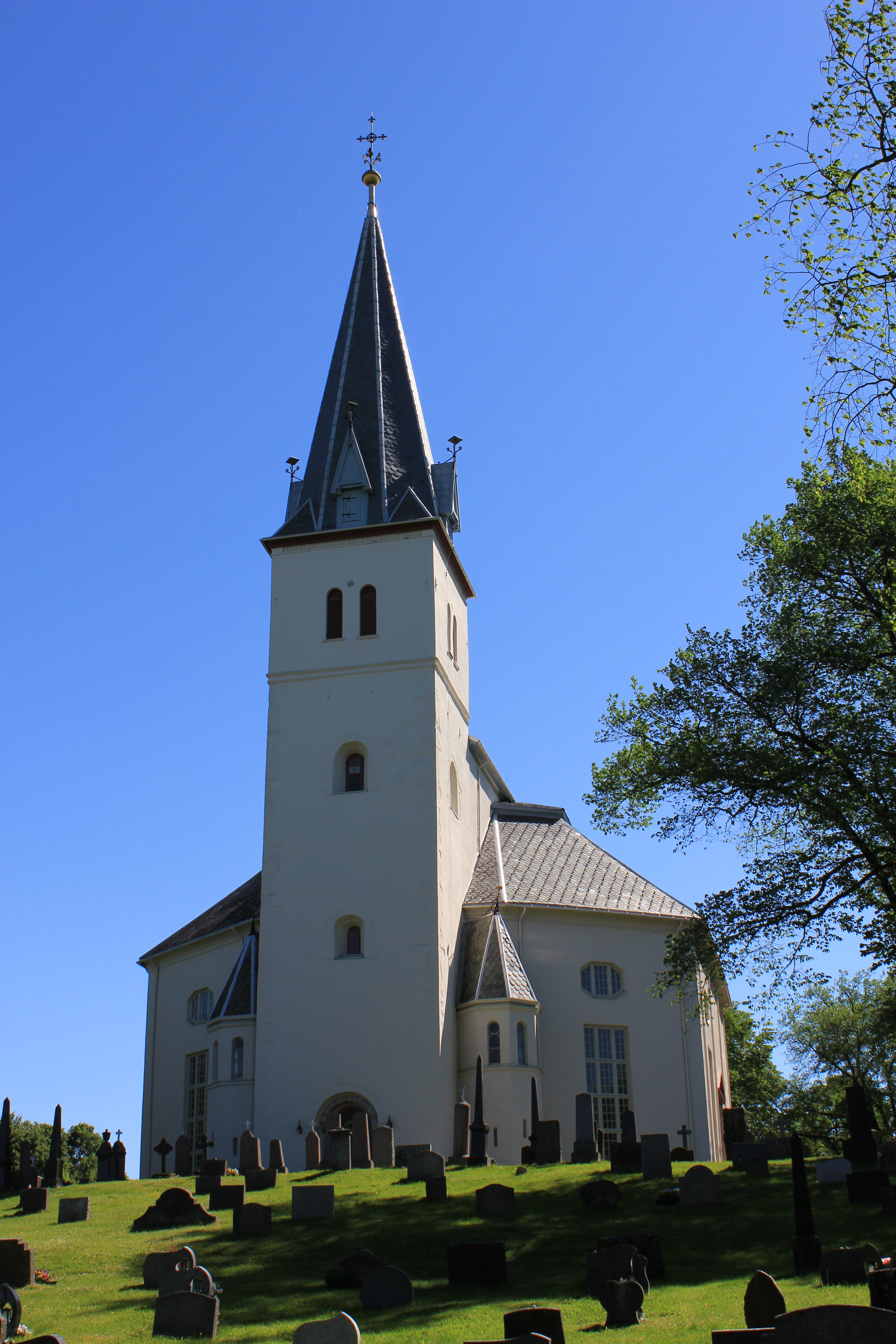
Vang Church in Hedmark designed by Abraham Pihl

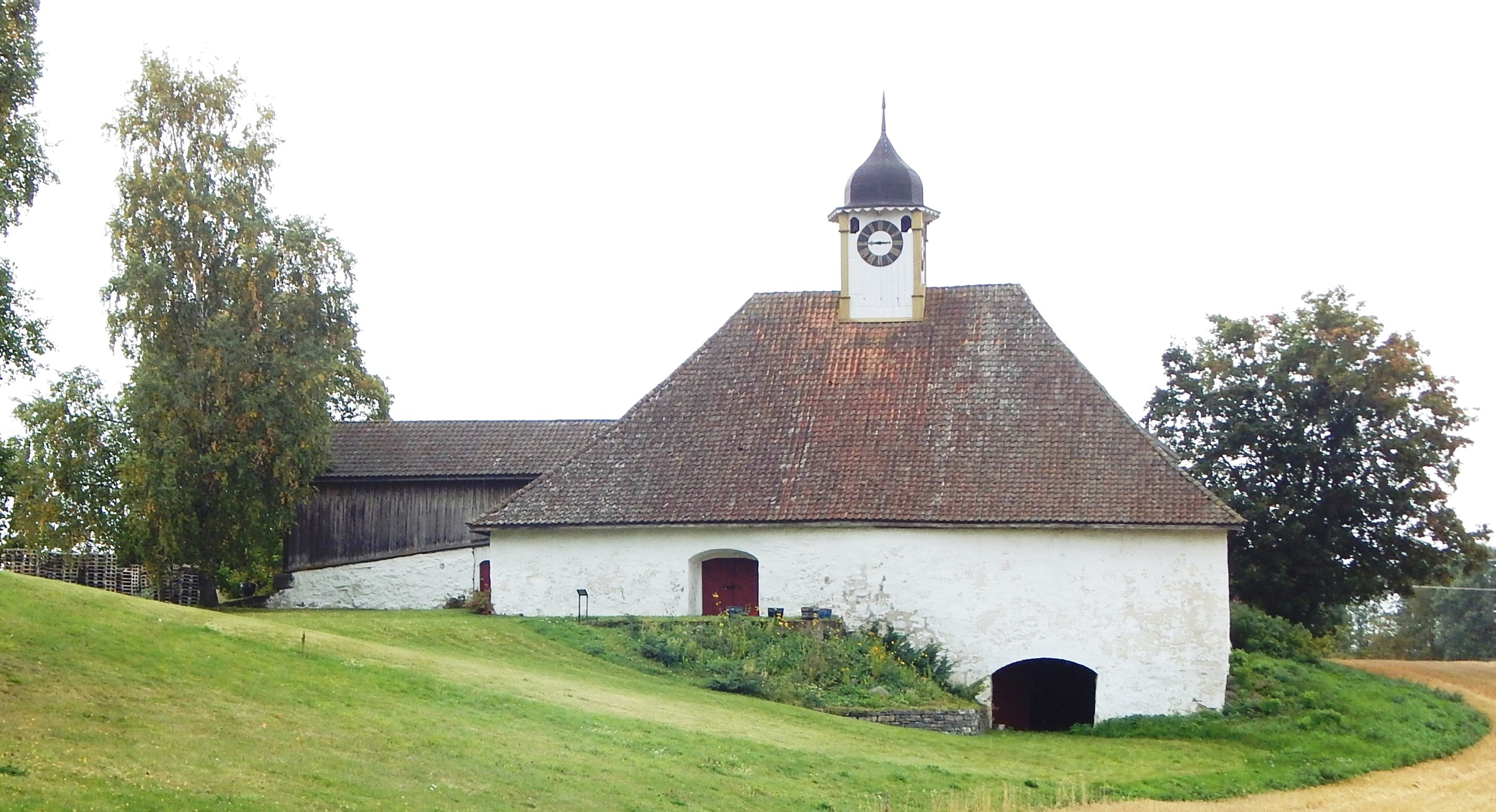
Torshov farm building in Vang designed by Abraham Pihl

Abraham Pihl was born in Gausdal, Oppland County, Norway. He completed seminary at the University of Copenhagen in 1783, where he had also studied mathematics, mechanics and astronomy.

In 1784, Pihl became vicar of Flekkefjord Church in Lister og Mandal county. From 1785 he was appointed Denmark-Norway's astronomical observer in Norway. In 1789, he was appointed to serve as priest of Vang Church in Hamar, Hedmark, where he would serve until his death in 1821. When Vang church burned down in 1804, Pihl designed the new church and oversaw construction work. The church has an octagonal shape and, with 1000 seats, is the second largest of Norway's octagonal churches. The building later served as a model for octagonal churches on the western side of Mjøsa.

Pihl developed a large collection of self-made astronomical instruments, and also made telescopes and sextants for others. He designed Vang Church, which burned down and was rebuilt between 1804 and 1810. He started large-scale production of pendulum clocks. The rectory became the largest employer in Vang, with up to 140 persons employed. His interest in practical matters categorized him as a so-called "potato priest" (Norwegian: potetprest).

== Honors ==
He was decorated Knight of the Order of Dannebrog in 1809 for his scientific efforts.

== Personal life ==
His father Andreas Pihl (1726–1781) was vicar of Gausdal. His grandfather Joachim Pihl (1689–1762) was provost for Gudbrandsdalen. In 1784, he married Anna Cathrine Neumann (1764–1850), daughter of Jacob Neumann, who operated the Hassel Iron Works in Modum. They were the parents of eight children and were the grandparents of engineers Oluf Pihl and Carl Abraham Pihl.

== Other sources ==
- Imerslund, Knut (2010) Abraham Pihl - prest, prost og tusenkunstner (Oplandske Bokforlag) ISBN 978-82-7518-173-0
