= Election church =

Term for some churches in Norway

An election church (Norwegian: valgkirke) is a term used for approximately 300 churches in Norway that were used as polling stations during the elections to the Norwegian Constituent Assembly at Eidsvoll in 1814. This was Norway's first national elections and this assembly is the group that wrote the Constitution of Norway. The churches were used because they were the natural center of public life for most places in the country, and because the parish (Norwegian: prestegjeld) was the basic unit of the electoral system.

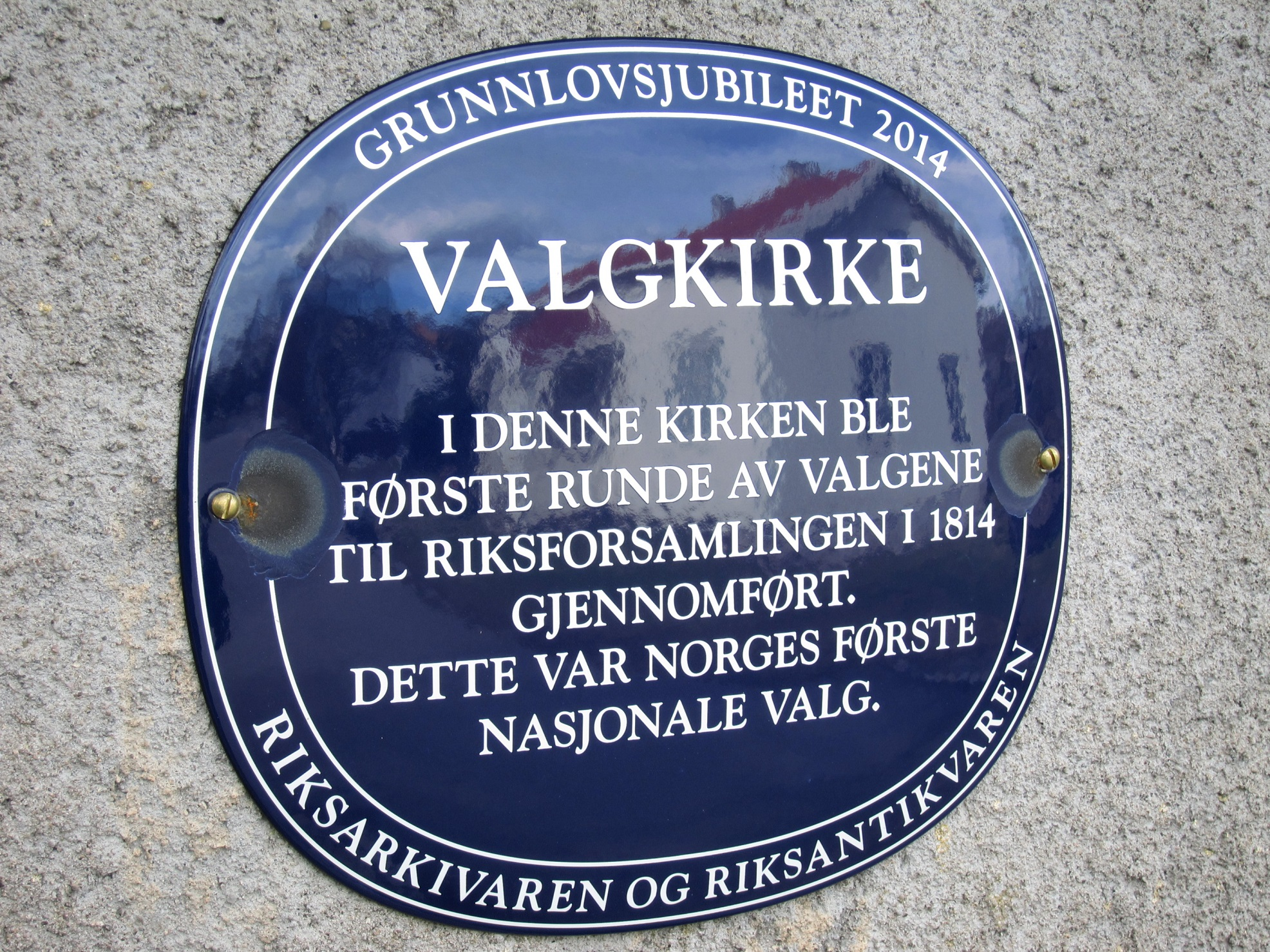
Plaque commemorating the 1814 election at Vang Church

The parish priest was the chief official in the local community, and it was usually the parish priest that administered the elections. The elections were essentially indirect elections, in which the people of each parish chose an "elector". A few days later, all the electors in the county met together at a central church in the county. At that meeting, the electors chose the representatives to send to Eidsvoll. In some small towns with only one congregation, the selection took place through direct voting. The first elections took place on a general day of prayer declared on Friday, February 25, 1814.

Many of these churches have been lost since 1814. Some have burned down, but most of the churches that are gone were torn down and replaced by new churches. About 190 election churches are still standing and are preserved historical sites. On the 200th anniversary of the vote in 2014, the National Archives and the Directorate for Cultural Heritage collaborated to label the churches with blue plaques and to reprint facsimiles of the documents stating the addresses and authority of these churches.
