= Aandahl =

Aandahl is a Norwegian surname. Notable people with the surname include:

- Fred G. Aandahl (1897–1966), American politician
- Søren Jørgensen Aandahl (1802–1886), Norwegian politician

== See also ==
- Aadahl
