= Eid og Voll Municipality =

Former municipality in Romsdal, Norway

Eid og Voll Municipality Eid og Voll herred Voll og Eid herred
- Former municipality
- Møre og Romsdal within Norway

- Eid og Voll within Møre og Romsdal
- Coordinates: 62°32′00″N 07°26′00″E
- Country: Norway
- County: Møre og Romsdal
- District: Romsdal
- Established: 1 Jan 1840
  - Preceded by: Grytten Municipality
- Disestablished: 1 Jan 1874
  - Succeeded by: Eid Municipality and Voll Municipality
- Administrative centre: Voll

Government
  - Mayor (1870-1874): Jacob Vold

Area (upon dissolution)
  - Total: 296.8 km^{2} (114.6 sq mi)
- Highest elevation: 1,786 m (5,860 ft)

Population (1873)
  - Total: 1,743
  - Density: 5.873/km^{2} (15.21/sq mi)
- Demonym(s): Eiding; Vollsokning
- Time zone: UTC+01:00 (CET)
  - Summer (DST): UTC+02:00 (CEST)
- ISO 3166 code: NO-1537

Eid og Voll (historically: Voll og Eid) is a former municipality in Møre og Romsdal county, Norway. The 297-square-kilometre (115 sq mi) municipality existed from 1840 until its dissolution in 1874. The area is now the northwestern part of Rauma Municipality in the traditional district of Romsdal. The administrative centre was the village of Voll. Other villages in the municipality were Innfjorden and Eidsbygda.

Prior to its dissolution in 1874, the 297-square-kilometre (115 sq mi) municipality had a population of about 1,743. The municipality's population density was 5.9 inhabitants per square kilometre (15/sq mi).

== General information ==
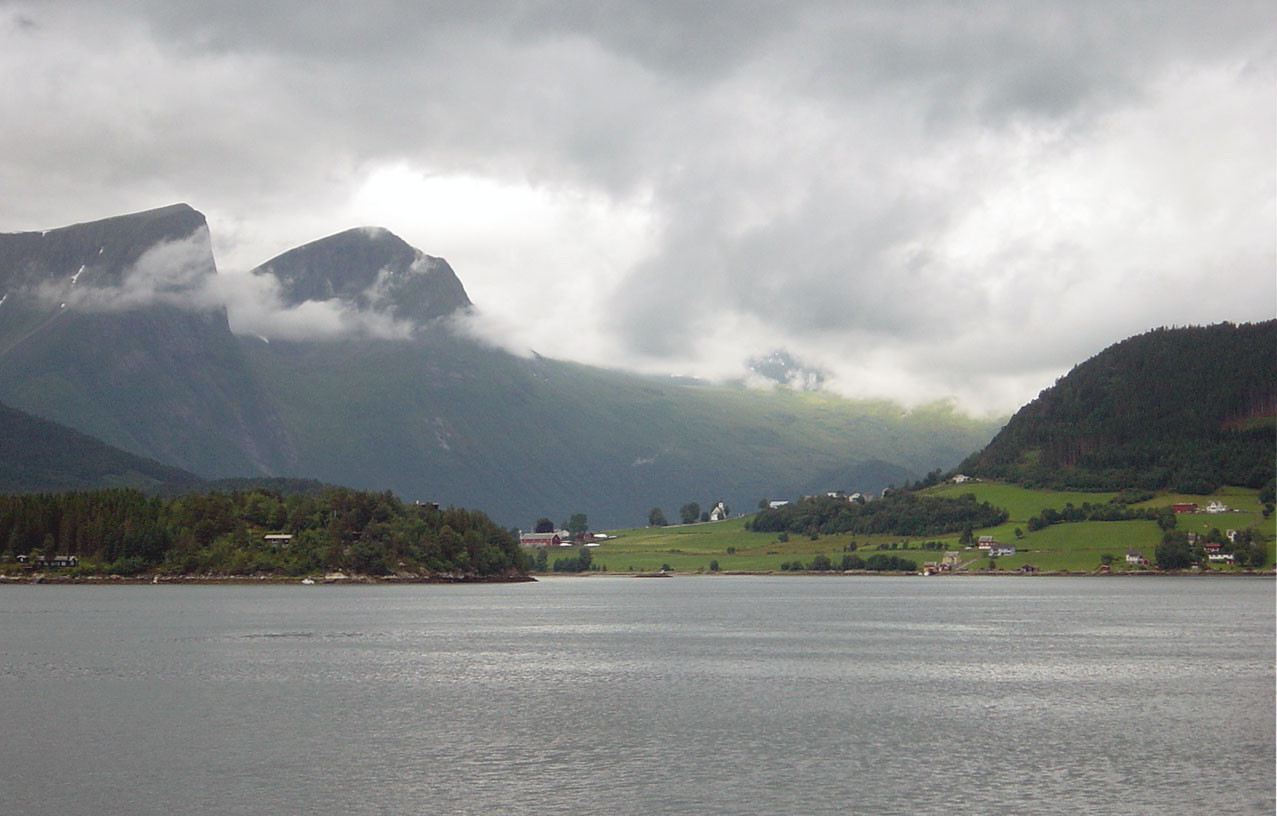
View of the Eidsbygda area

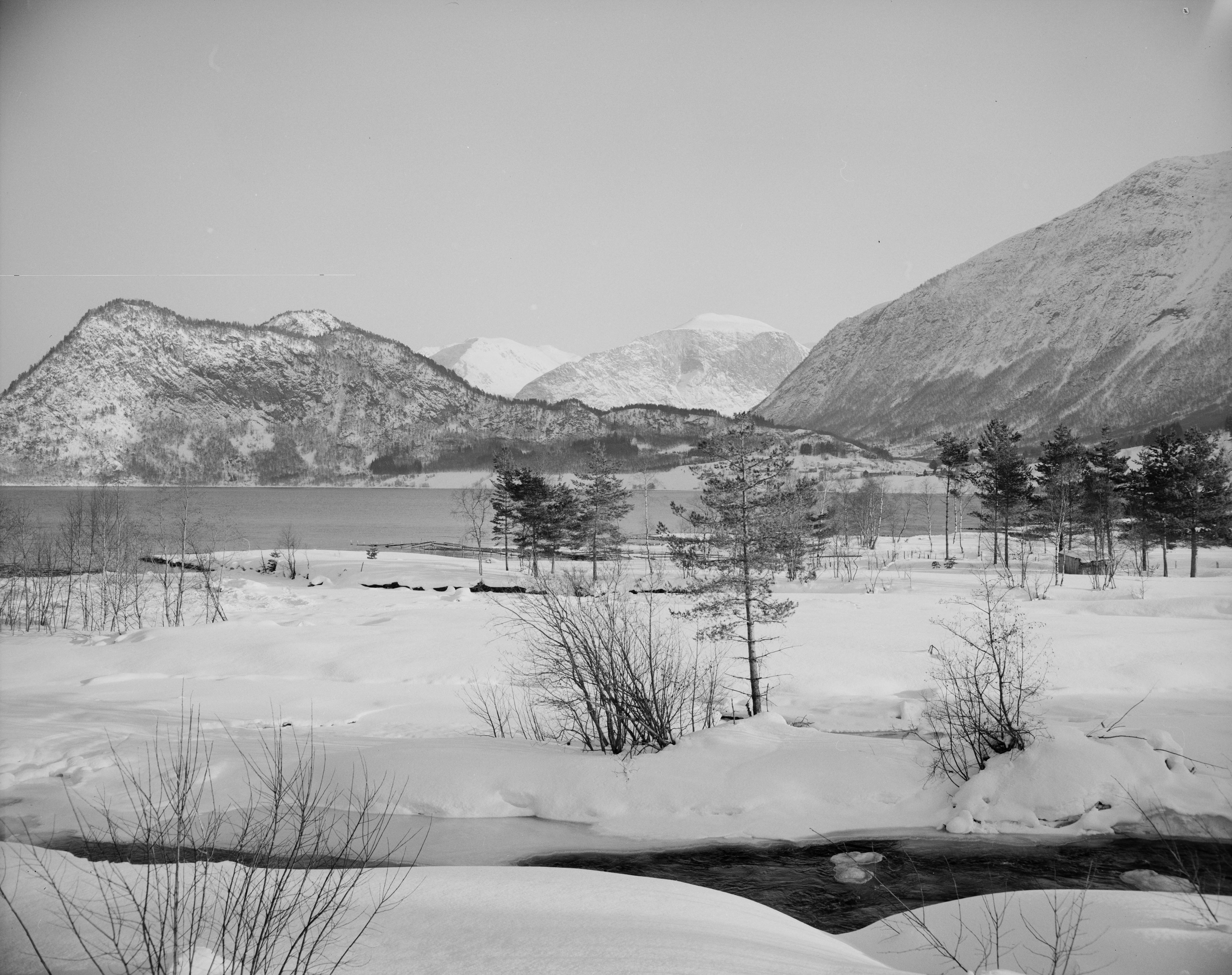
Winter in the Måndalen area

The municipality of Voll og Eid (lit. 'Voll and Eid') was established on 1 January 1840 when it was split away from the large Grytten Municipality. According to the 1835 census the municipality had a population of 1,211.

Soon after the municipality was created, talk of dividing it began since a large fjord cut the municipality into two parts that were not connected. On 10 September 1862, the Torvik, Monsås, and Hagen farms in Grytten Municipality were transferred to Voll og Eid Municipality. In 1863, the name was switched to Eid og Voll. On 1 January 1874, Eid og Voll Municipality was divided to create two municipalities: Eid Municipality (population: 1,048) on the north side of the fjord and Voll Municipality (population: 695) on the south side of the fjord.

During the 1960s, there were many municipal mergers across Norway due to the work of the Schei Committee. On 1 January 1964, both Eid Municipality and Voll Municipality were merged with Grytten Municipality, Hen Municipality, and part of Veøy Municipality to form the new Rauma Municipality.

=== Name ===
The municipality is compound name made up of two areas along the Romsdalsfjorden: Eid and Voll. The first part of the name comes from the old Eid farm (Old Norse: Eið) since the first Eid Church was built there. The name comes from the word eið which means "isthmus" since the farm was located on an isthmus between two fjords. The second part of the name comes from the old Voll farm (Old Norse: Vǫllr) since the first Voll Church was built there. The name comes from the word vǫllr which means "meadow" or "field".

=== Churches ===
The Church of Norway had two parishes (sokn) within Eid og Voll Municipality. At the time of the municipal dissolution, it was part of the Eid prestegjeld and the Indre Romsdal prosti (deanery) in the Diocese of Nidaros.

Churches in Eid og Voll Municipality
Parish (sokn)	Church name	Location of the church	Year built
Eid	Eid Church	Eidsbygda	1796
Voll	Voll Church	Voll	c. 1664

== Geography ==
The municipality was located along both sides of the Romsdalsfjorden. Veøy Municipality was to the north, Grytten Municipality was to the east, Norddal Municipality was to the south, and Stranda Municipality and Vestnes Municipality were to the west. The highest point in the municipality was the 1,786-metre (5,860 ft) tall mountain Finnan, on the border with Grytten Municipality.

== Government ==
While it existed, Eid og Voll Municipality was governed by a municipal council (Herredsstyre) of directly elected representatives. The mayor was indirectly elected by a vote of the municipal council. The municipality was under the jurisdiction of the Frostating Court of Appeal.

=== Mayors ===
The mayor (Norwegian: ordfører) of Eid og Voll Municipality is the political leader of the municipality and the chairperson of the municipal council. Here is a list of people who have held this position:

- 1840–1845: Lars Knudsen Wiig
- 1846–1847: Knud S. Engen
- 1848–1851: Lars P. Sæbøe
- 1852–1853: Lars Knudsen Wiig
- 1854–1857: Ole B. Haukeberg
- 1858–1863: Lars P. Sæbøe
- 1864–1865: Paul Gyldenaas
- 1866–1867: Ingebrigt Lerheim
- 1868–1869: Iver Olsen Skjelbostad
- 1870–1874: Jacob Vold

== See also ==
- List of former municipalities of Norway
