= Eid Municipality (Møre og Romsdal) =

Former municipality in Møre og Romsdal, Norway

Eid Municipality Eid herred
- Former municipality
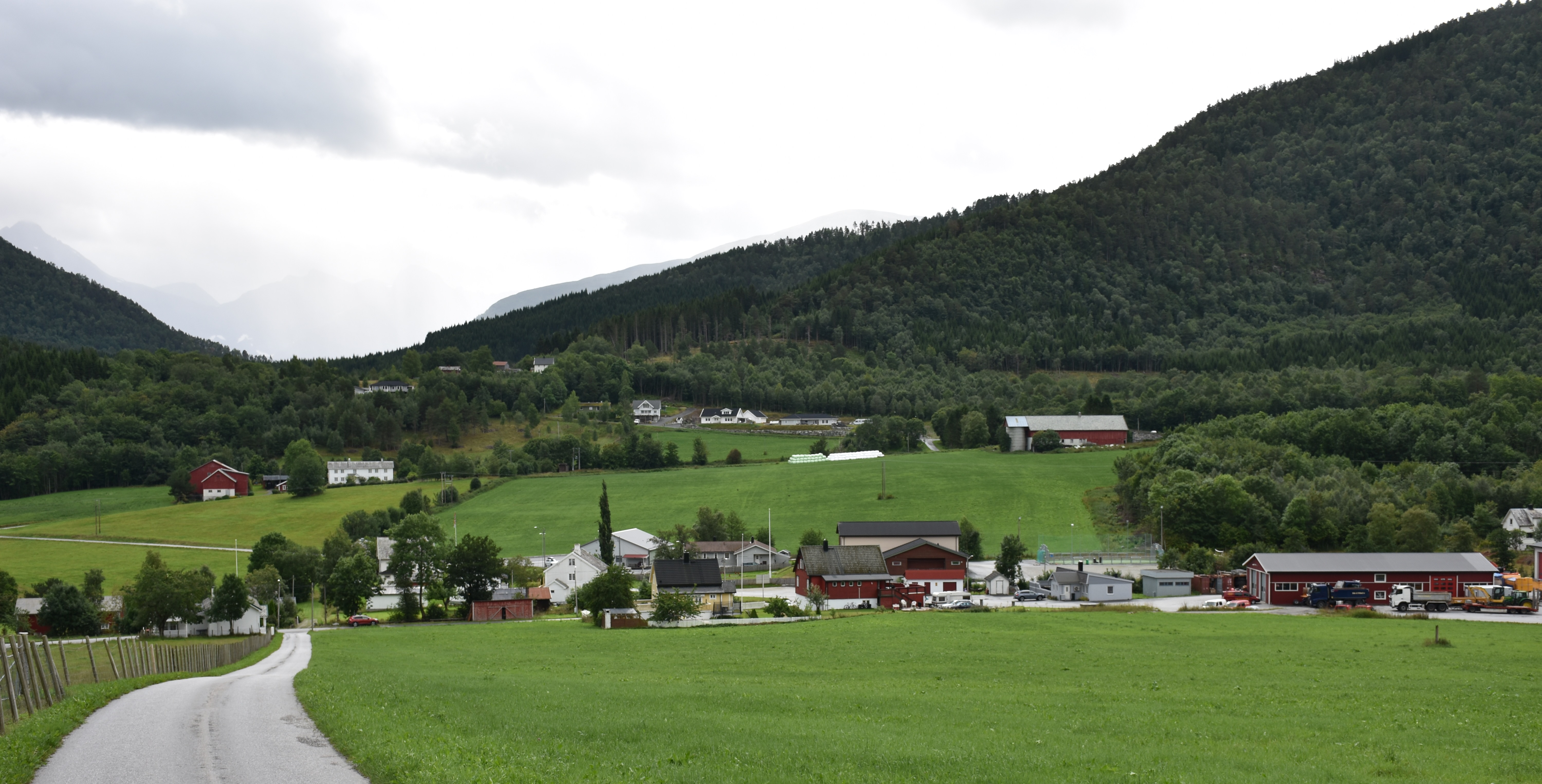

- Møre og Romsdal within Norway

- Eid within Møre og Romsdal
- Coordinates: 62°35′12″N 07°29′41″E
- Country: Norway
- County: Møre og Romsdal
- District: Romsdal
- Established: 1 Jan 1874
  - Preceded by: Eid og Voll Municipality
- Disestablished: 1 Jan 1964
  - Succeeded by: Rauma Municipality
- Administrative centre: Eidsbygda

Government
  - Mayor (1948–1963): Erling Moen

Area (upon dissolution)
  - Total: 36.1 km^{2} (13.9 sq mi)
  - Rank: #605 in Norway
- Highest elevation: 1,048 m (3,438 ft)

Population (1963)
  - Total: 391
  - Rank: #685 in Norway
  - Density: 10.8/km^{2} (28/sq mi)
  - Change (10 years): ▲ +4%
- Demonym: Eiding

Official language
  - Norwegian form: Neutral
- Time zone: UTC+01:00 (CET)
  - Summer (DST): UTC+02:00 (CEST)
- ISO 3166 code: NO-1538

Eid is a former municipality in Møre og Romsdal county, Norway. The 36-square-kilometre (14 sq mi) municipality existed from 1874 until its dissolution in 1964. The area is now part of Rauma Municipality in the traditional district of Romsdal. The administrative centre was the village of Eidsbygda.

Prior to its dissolution in 1964, the 36.1-square-kilometre (13.9 sq mi) municipality was the 605th largest by area out of the 689 municipalities in Norway. Eid Municipality was the 685th most populous municipality in Norway with a population of about 391. The municipality's population density was 10.8 inhabitants per square kilometre (28/sq mi) and its population had increased by 4% over the previous 10-year period.

== General information ==
The small municipality of Eid was established on 1 January 1874 when the old Eid og Voll Municipality was divided into two: Eid Municipality (population: 1,048) on the northeast side of the Romsdalsfjorden and Voll Municipality (population: 695) on the other side of the fjord.

During the 1960s, there were many municipal mergers across Norway due to the work of the Schei Committee. On 1 January 1964, a large municipal merger took place. The following places were merged to form the new Rauma Municipality on that date:

- all of Eid Municipality (population: 381)
- all of Grytten Municipality (population: 3,683)
- all of Hen Municipality (population: 1,663)
- all of Voll Municipality (population: 1,163)
- the southern part of Veøy Municipality (population: 1,400)

=== Name ===
The municipality is named after the old Eid farm (Old Norse: Eið) since the first Eid Church was built there. The name comes from the word eið which means "isthmus" since the farm was located on an isthmus between two fjords.

=== Churches ===
The Church of Norway had one parish (sokn) within Eid Municipality. At the time of the municipal dissolution, it was part of the Eid prestegjeld and the Indre Romsdal prosti (deanery) in the Diocese of Nidaros.

Churches in Eid Municipality
Parish (sokn)	Church name	Location of the church	Year built
Eid	Eid Church	Eidsbygda	1796

== Geography ==
It was located along the Romsdalsfjorden in the north-central part of the present-day Rauma Municipality. The administrative centre and largest population centre was the village of Eidsbygda. The municipality then extended to the southeast to the coast of the Isfjorden. The highest point in the municipality was the 1,048-metre (3,438 ft) tall mountain Skarven, a tripoint located on the border with Grytten Municipality and Veøy Municipality. Veøy Municipality was to the north, Grytten Municipality was to the east, and Voll Municipality were to the south and west (across the fjord).

== Government ==
While it existed, Eid Municipality was responsible for primary education (through 10th grade), outpatient health services, senior citizen services, welfare and other social services, zoning, economic development, and municipal roads and utilities. The municipality was governed by a municipal council of directly elected representatives. The mayor was indirectly elected by a vote of the municipal council. The municipality was under the jurisdiction of the Frostating Court of Appeal.

=== Municipal council ===
The municipal council (Herredsstyre) of Eid Municipality was made up of 13 representatives that were elected to four year terms. The tables below show the historical composition of the council by political party.

Eid herredsstyre 1959–1963
Party name (in Norwegian)	Number of representatives
Local List(s) (Lokale lister)	13
Total number of members:	13

Eid herredsstyre 1955–1959
Party name (in Norwegian)	Number of representatives
Local List(s) (Lokale lister)	13
Total number of members:	13

Eid herredsstyre 1951–1955
Party name (in Norwegian)	Number of representatives
Farmers' Party (Bondepartiet)	7
List of workers, fishermen, and small farmholders (Arbeidere, fiskere, småbrukere liste)	2
Local List(s) (Lokale lister)	3
Total number of members:	12

Eid herredsstyre 1947–1951
Party name (in Norwegian)	Number of representatives
Local List(s) (Lokale lister)	12
Total number of members:	12

Eid herredsstyre 1945–1947
Party name (in Norwegian)	Number of representatives
Labour Party (Arbeiderpartiet)	3
Joint List(s) of Non-Socialist Parties (Borgerlige Felleslister)	9
Total number of members:	12

Eid herredsstyre 1937–1941*
Party name (in Norwegian)	Number of representatives
Local List(s) (Lokale lister)	12
Total number of members:	12
Note: Due to the German occupation of Norway during World War II, no elections were held for new municipal councils until after the war ended in 1945.

=== Mayors ===
The mayor (Norwegian: ordfører) of Eid Municipality was the political leader of the municipality and the chairperson of the municipal council. The following people have held this position:

- 1874–1875: Johan Frisvold
- 1876–1877: Ole Hamre
- 1878–1879: Ole Torvik
- 1880–1883: T. Lereim
- 1884–1893: Ole Hamre
- 1893–1907: Anton Eide
- 1908–1910: Ole Norvik
- 1911–1923: Tore Midtbust
- 1923–1925: Ole Mittet
- 1925–1931: Engelbrekt Lerheim
- 1931–1942: Anders P. Strømme
- 1942–1943: Edvard Engen (NS)
- 1943–1943: Knut Johansen Eide (NS)
- 1943–1944: David Leonhardt Strømme (NS)
- 1945–1947: Anders P. Strømme
- 1948–1963: Erling Moen

== See also ==
- List of former municipalities of Norway
