= Isfjorden =

Isfjorden, meaning "ice fjord", may refer to:

== Places ==
- Isfjorden (Svalbard), a fjord on the island of Spitsbergen in Svalbard, Norway
- Isfjorden (village), a village in Rauma Municipality, Norway
- Isfjorden (fjord in Møre og Romsdal), a fjord in Rauma Municipality, Norway
- Isfjorden (Troms), a fjord in Kvænangen Municipality, Norway
- Isfjord, a fjord in eastern Greenland

== Other ==
- SS Isfjord, Norwegian cargo and passenger ship in service in the early 20th century
- Isfjord Radio in Svalbard

== See also ==
- Ice Fjord, South Georgia
- Ísafjörður in Iceland
