= Grytten Municipality =

Former municipality in Møre og Romsdal, Norway

Grytten Municipality Grytten herred
- Former municipality
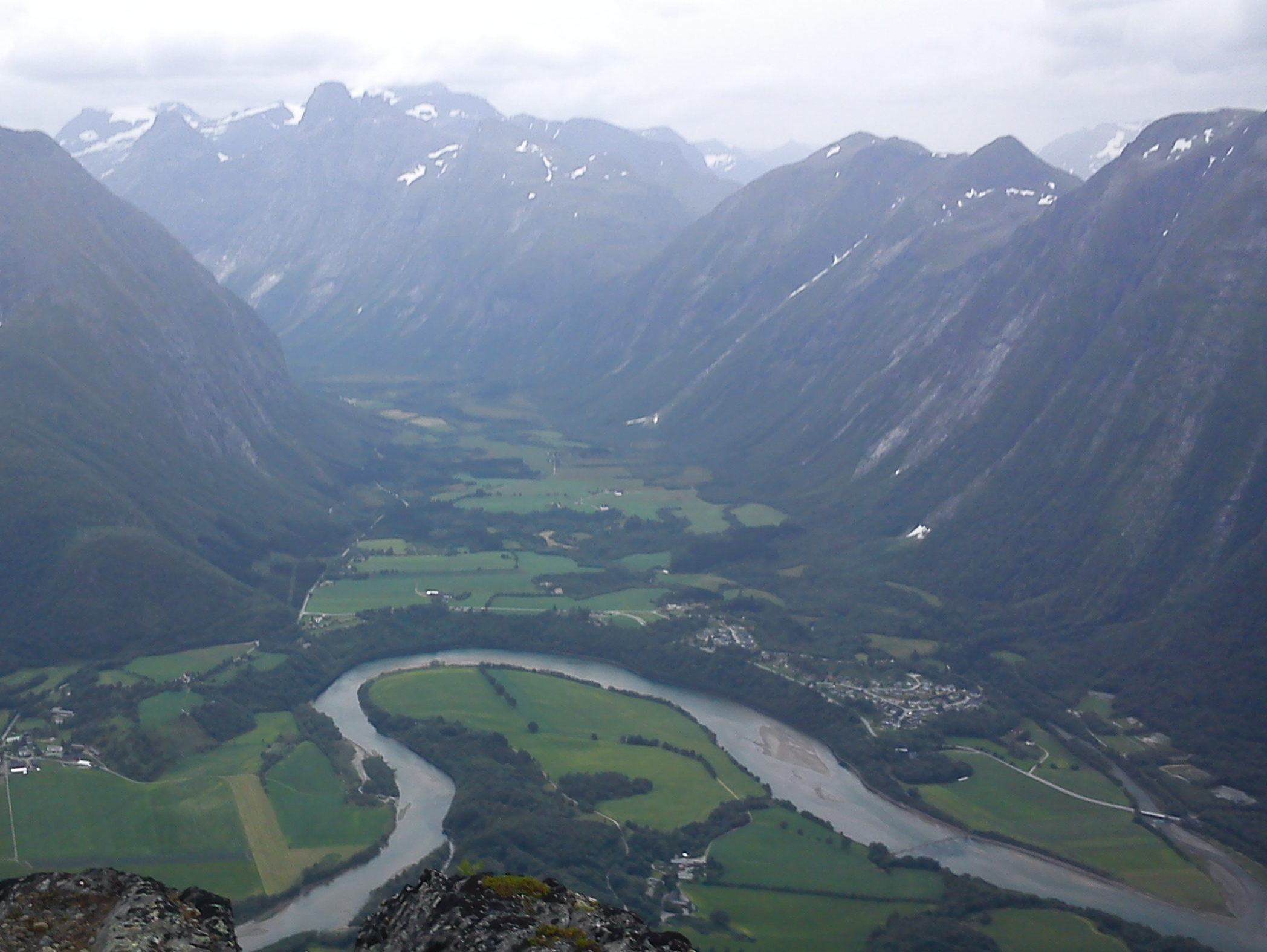

- Møre og Romsdal within Norway

- Grytten within Møre og Romsdal
- Coordinates: 62°30′N 07°41′E
- Country: Norway
- County: Møre og Romsdal
- District: Romsdal
- Established: 1 January 1838
  - Created as: Formannskapsdistrikt
- Disestablished: 1 January 1964
  - Succeeded by: Rauma Municipality
- Administrative centre: Åndalsnes

Government
  - Mayor (1961-1963): Alf Hanekamhaug (Sp)

Area (upon dissolution)
  - Total: 798.9 km^{2} (308.5 sq mi)
  - Rank: #116 in Norway
- Highest elevation: 1,999 m (6,558 ft)

Population (1963)
  - Total: 3,655
  - Rank: #245 in Norway
  - Density: 4.6/km^{2} (12/sq mi)
  - Change (10 years): ▼ −1.2%

Official language
  - Norwegian form: Neutral
- Time zone: UTC+01:00 (CET)
  - Summer (DST): UTC+02:00 (CEST)
- ISO 3166 code: NO-1539

Grytten is a former municipality in Møre og Romsdal county, Norway. The 799-square-kilometre (308 sq mi) municipality existed from 1838 until its dissolution in 1964. The area is now part of Rauma Municipality in the traditional district of Romsdal. The administrative centre was the village of Åndalsnes.

Prior to its dissolution in 1964, the 799-square-kilometre (308 sq mi) municipality was the 116th largest by area out of the 689 municipalities in Norway. Grytten Municipality was the 245th most populous municipality in Norway with a population of about 3,655. The municipality's population density was 4.6 inhabitants per square kilometre (12/sq mi) and its population had decreased by 1.2% over the previous 10-year period.

== General information ==
Grytten was established as a municipality on 1 January 1838 (see formannskapsdistrikt law). On 1 January 1840, the northwestern part of Grytten Municipality was separated to form the new Voll og Eid Municipality. Then on 1 January 1902, Grytten Municipality was divided. The northeastern part became the new Hen Municipality (population: 1,128) and the rest remained as Grytten Municipality (population: 1,728).

During the 1960s, there were many municipal mergers across Norway due to the work of the Schei Committee. On 1 January 1964, a large municipal merger took place. The following places were merged to form the new Rauma Municipality on that date:

- all of Grytten Municipality (population: 3,683)
- all of Eid Municipality (population: 381)
- all of Hen Municipality (population: 1,663)
- all of Voll Municipality (population: 1,163)
- the southern part of Veøy Municipality (population: 1,400)

=== Name ===
The municipality (originally the parish) is named after the old Grytten farm (Old Norse: Grýtin) since the first Grytten Church was built there. The first element is grjót which means "coarse stones" or "rubble". The last element is vin which means "meadow" or "pasture".

=== Churches ===
The Church of Norway had two parishes (sokn) within Grytten Municipality. At the time of the municipal dissolution, it was part of the Grytten prestegjeld and the Indre Romsdal prosti (deanery) in the Diocese of Nidaros.

Churches in Grytten Municipality
Parish (sokn)	Church name	Location of the church	Year built
Grytten	Grytten Church	Veblungsnes	1829
Kors	Kors Church	Marstein in Romsdalen	1797

== Geography ==
The municipality encompassed the Romsdalen valley (which follows the Rauma River) from the Oppland county border to the inner part of the Romsdal Fjord at Åndalsnes, as well as some smaller side valleys. The original municipality of Grytten was almost identical to the present-day Rauma Municipality, plus the southern part of Veøy Municipality (south of the Langfjorden). The highest point in the municipality was the 1,999-metre (6,558 ft) tall mountain Puttegga. Veøy Municipality was to the north, Hen Municipality and Eresfjord og Vistdal Municipality were to the east, Lesja Municipality and Skjåk Municipality (both in Oppland county) were to the south, Norddal Municipality and Voll Municipality were to the west, and Eid Municipality was to the northwest.

== Government ==
While it existed, Grytten Municipality was responsible for primary education (through 10th grade), outpatient health services, senior citizen services, welfare and other social services, zoning, economic development, and municipal roads and utilities. The municipality was governed by a municipal council of directly elected representatives. The mayor was indirectly elected by a vote of the municipal council. The municipality was under the jurisdiction of the Frostating Court of Appeal.

=== Municipal council ===
The municipal council (Herredsstyre) of Grytten Municipality was made up of representatives that were elected to four year terms. The tables below show the historical composition of the council by political party.

Grytten herredsstyre 1959–1963
Party name (in Norwegian)	Number of representatives
Labour Party (Arbeiderpartiet)	9
Conservative Party (Høyre)	2
Christian Democratic Party (Kristelig Folkeparti)	3
Centre Party (Senterpartiet)	3
Liberal Party (Venstre)	4
Total number of members:	21

Grytten herredsstyre 1955–1959
Party name (in Norwegian)	Number of representatives
Labour Party (Arbeiderpartiet)	9
Conservative Party (Høyre)	2
Christian Democratic Party (Kristelig Folkeparti)	4
Farmers' Party (Bondepartiet)	2
Liberal Party (Venstre)	4
Total number of members:	21

Grytten herredsstyre 1951–1955
Party name (in Norwegian)	Number of representatives
Labour Party (Arbeiderpartiet)	10
Joint List(s) of Non-Socialist Parties (Borgerlige Felleslister)	10
Total number of members:	20

Grytten herredsstyre 1947–1951
Party name (in Norwegian)	Number of representatives
Labour Party (Arbeiderpartiet)	8
Joint List(s) of Non-Socialist Parties (Borgerlige Felleslister)	12
Total number of members:	20

Grytten herredsstyre 1945–1947
Party name (in Norwegian)	Number of representatives
Labour Party (Arbeiderpartiet)	6
List of workers, fishermen, and small farmholders (Arbeidere, fiskere, småbrukere liste)	3
Joint List(s) of Non-Socialist Parties (Borgerlige Felleslister)	8
Local List(s) (Lokale lister)	3
Total number of members:	20

Grytten herredsstyre 1937–1941*
Party name (in Norwegian)	Number of representatives
Labour Party (Arbeiderpartiet)	7
Joint List(s) of Non-Socialist Parties (Borgerlige Felleslister)	5
Local List(s) (Lokale lister)	8
Total number of members:	20
Note: Due to the German occupation of Norway during World War II, no elections were held for new municipal councils until after the war ended in 1945.

=== Mayors ===
The mayor (Norwegian: ordfører) of Grytten Municipality was the political leader of the municipality and the chairperson of the municipal council. The following people have held this position:

- 1838–1850: Søren Jørgensen Aandahl
- 1851–1855: Harald Onsum
- 1855–1860: Søren Jørgensen Aandahl
- 1860–1867: Lars Eriksen Tokle
- 1868–1881: Harald Onsum
- 1882–1884: Christian Torke
- 1884–1901: Erik Olsen Tokle
- 1902–1907: Ole Hole
- 1908–1910: Hans Penge
- 1911–1919: Ole Hole
- 1919–1941: Ole P. Ødegaard
- 1941–1942: Ole E. Nes
- 1942–1944: Peter O. Remmen
- 1945–1947: Ludvig B. Aarø
- 1947–1950: Anton Skare
- 1950–1951: Erik Midtgaard
- 1951–1955: Anton Stormyrbakken
- 1955–1961: Hans Hjelle (V)
- 1961–1963: Alf Hanekamhaug (Sp)

== See also ==
- List of former municipalities of Norway
