= Oddgeir Bruaset =

Norwegian journalist and writer

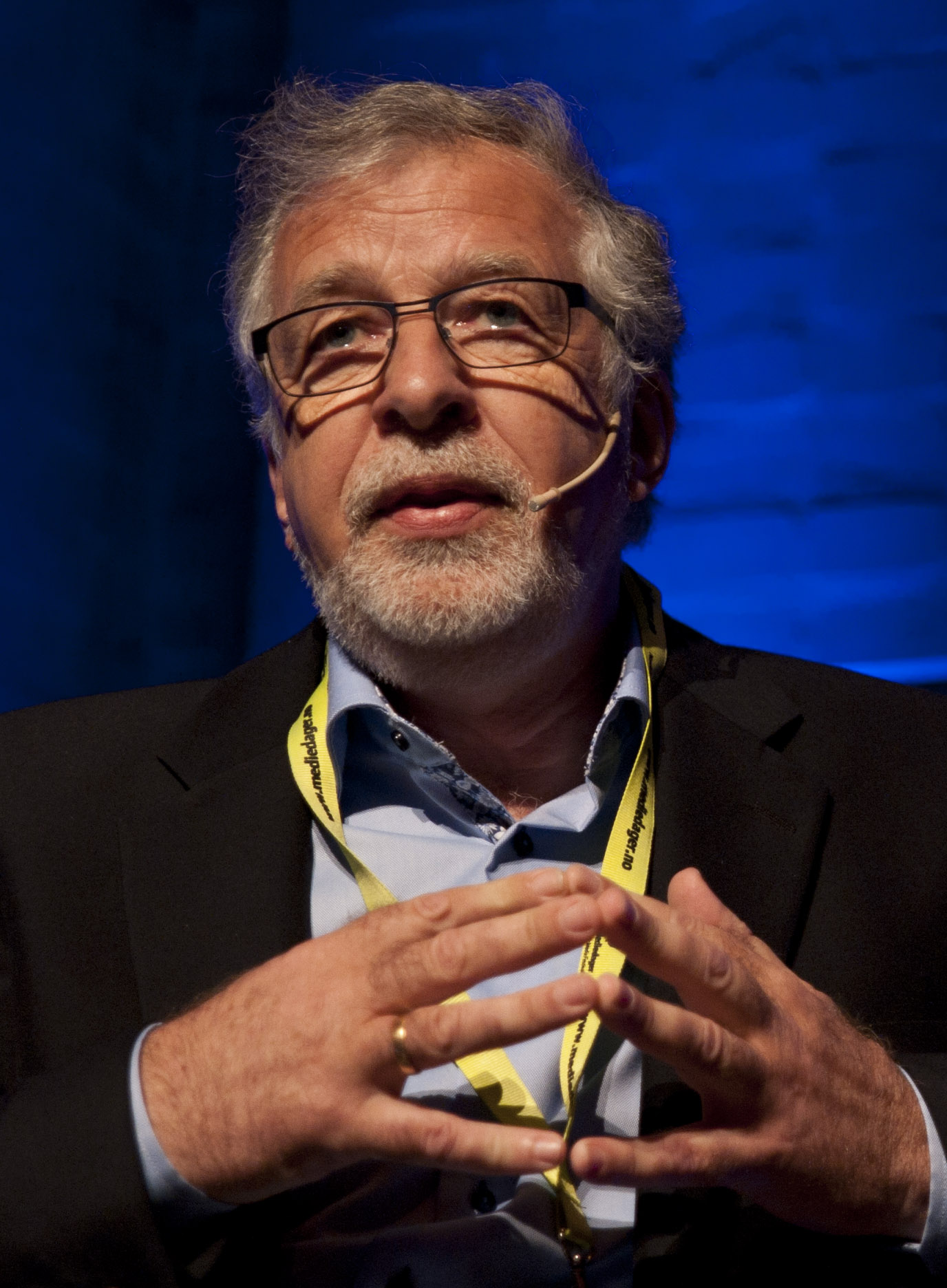
- Bruaset in 2011
- Born: 10 December 1944 (age 81); Voll Municipality, Norway
- Occupations: Journalist; Non-fiction writer

Oddgeir Bruaset (born 10 December 1944) is a Norwegian journalist and non-fiction writer.

Bruaset was born in Måndalen in Voll Municipality (now part of Rauma Municipality), Norway. He was assigned with the Norwegian Broadcasting Corporation from 1971 to 2014. He is particularly known for hosting the television documentary series, Der ingen skulle tru at nokon kunne bu, about people who live far off the beaten track. His books include Folket langs Storfjorden (two volumes, 1991 and 2004), Orkanen from 1992, Jostedalsbreen from 1996, and Sunnmøre og sunnmøringen from 1999. He won a Gullruten award in 2009, and the Gullruten honorary award in 2015. In 2009 he was awarded the King's Medal of Merit.
