= Eidsbygda =

Village in Rauma Municipality, Norway

- Village
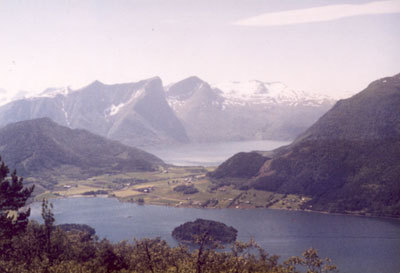
- View of Eidsbygda
- Interactive map of Eidsbygda
- Location within Møre og Romsdal Location within Norway
- Coordinates: 62.5868°N 7.4950°E
- Country: Norway
- Region: Western Norway
- County: Møre og Romsdal
- District: Romsdal
- Municipality: Rauma Municipality
- Elevation: 14 m (46 ft)
- Time zone: UTC+01:00 (CET)
  - Summer (DST): UTC+02:00 (CEST)
- Post Code: 6350 Eidsbygda

Eidsbygda is a village in Rauma Municipality in Møre og Romsdal county, Norway. It is located 12 kilometres (7.5 mi) northwest of the town of Åndalsnes, on an isthmus of land between the Rødvenfjorden and Romsdal Fjord.

== History ==
This village was the administrative center of the old Eid Municipality. The historic Eid Church is located in the eastern part of Eidsbygda. The village of Rødven (and the historic Rødven Stave Church) lies about 5 kilometres (3.1 mi) to the north of Eidsbygda.
