= Rødven =

Village in Rauma Municipality, Norway

- Village
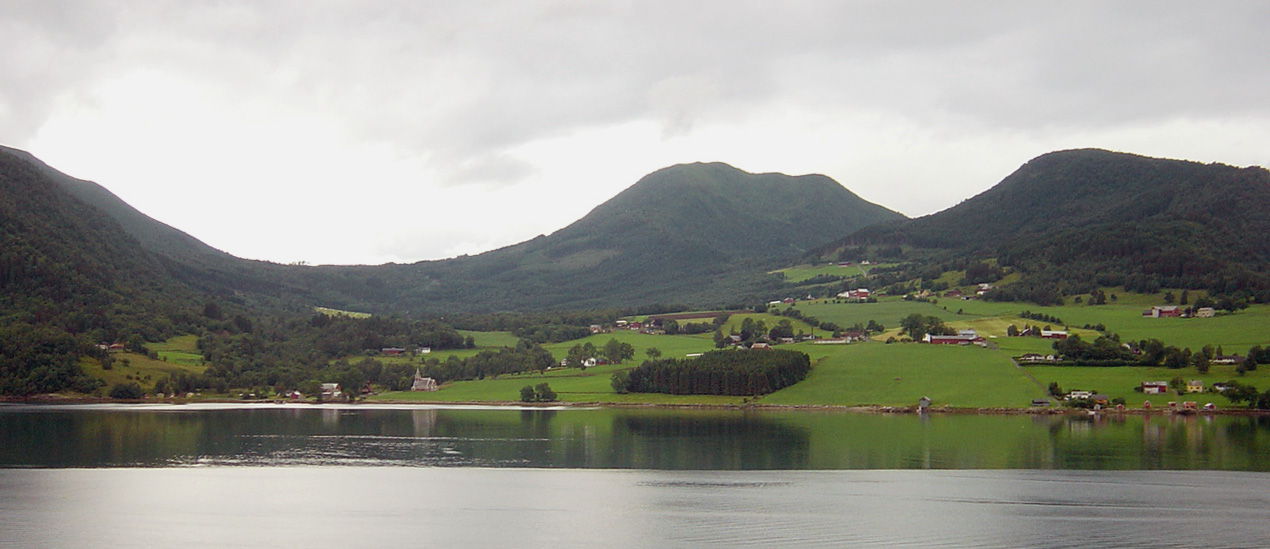
- View of the village
- Interactive map of Rødven
- Location within Møre og Romsdal Location within Norway
- Coordinates: 62.6239°N 7.4960°E
- Country: Norway
- Region: Western Norway
- County: Møre og Romsdal
- District: Romsdal
- Municipality: Rauma Municipality
- Elevation: 2 m (6.6 ft)
- Time zone: UTC+01:00 (CET)
  - Summer (DST): UTC+02:00 (CEST)
- Post Code: 6350 Eidsbygda

Rødven is a village in Rauma Municipality in Møre og Romsdal county, Norway. The village is located along the Rødvenfjorden, just south of where the fjord empties into Langfjorden. The village of Eidsbygda lies about 5 kilometres (3.1 mi) south of Rødven. The village is notable for the 12th century Rødven Stave Church. The church is now a museum and the much newer Rødven Church sits across the road from the historic stave church.
