= Rødven Church =

Church in Møre og Romsdal, Norway

- Rødven kyrkje
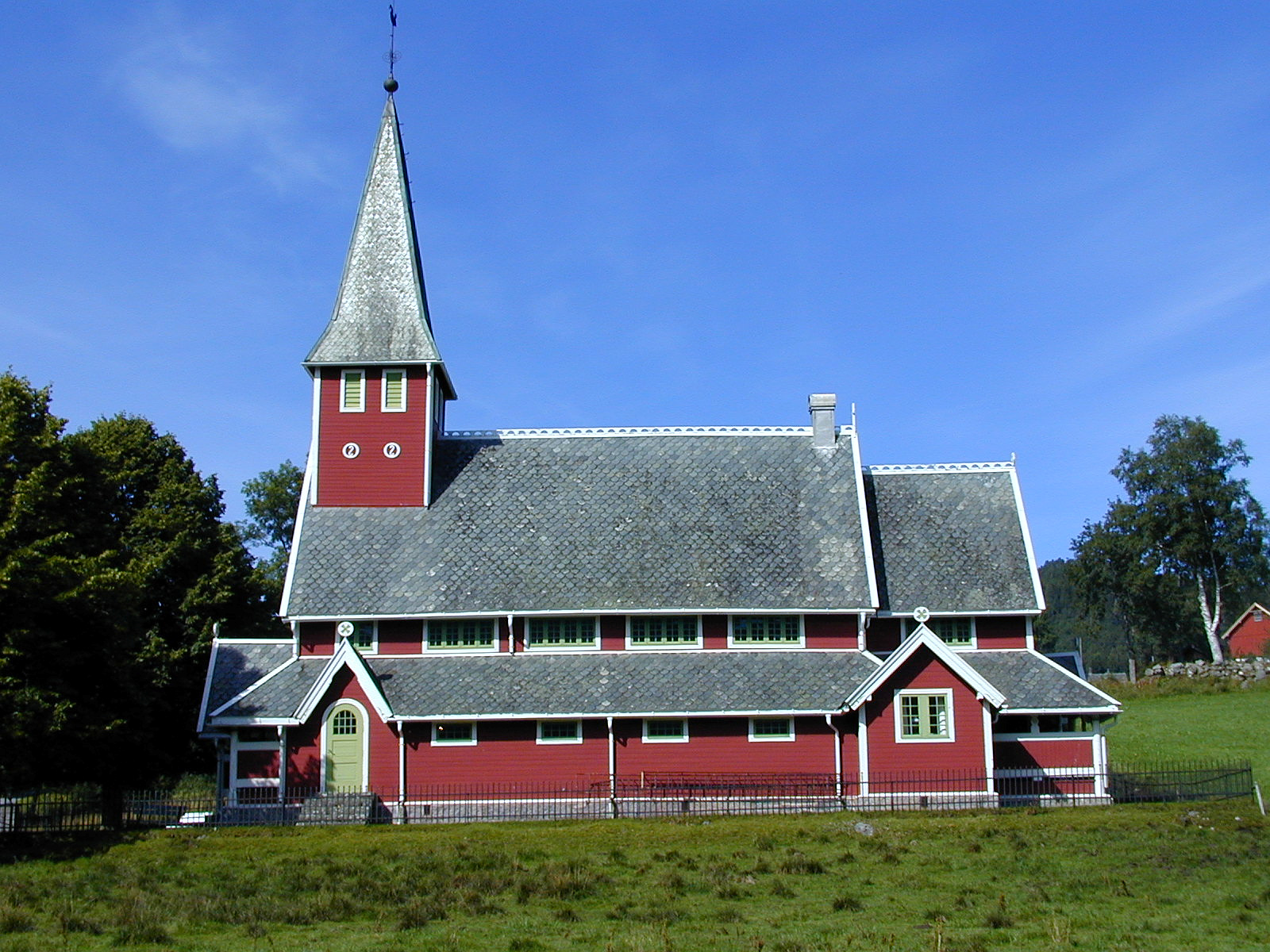
- View of the church
- Rødven Church
- 62°37′29″N 7°29′38″E
- Location: Rauma Municipality, Møre og Romsdal
- Country: Norway
- Denomination: Church of Norway
- Churchmanship: Evangelical Lutheran

History
- Status: Parish church
- Founded: 1907
- Consecrated: 1907

Architecture
- Functional status: Active
- Architect: Jens Kielland
- Architectural type: Long church
- Completed: 1907 (119 years ago)

Specifications
- Capacity: 120
- Materials: Wood

Administration
- Diocese: Møre bispedømme
- Deanery: Indre Romsdal prosti
- Parish: Eid og Holm

Rødven Church (Norwegian: Rødven kyrkje) is a parish church of the Church of Norway in Rauma Municipality in Møre og Romsdal county, Norway. It is located in the village of Rødven. It is one of the churches for the Eid og Holm parish which is part of the Indre Romsdal prosti (deanery) in the Diocese of Møre. The red, wooden church was built in a long church design in 1907 using plans drawn up by the architect Jens Zetlitz Monrad Kielland from Bergen. The church seats about 120 people.

== History ==
The parish structure in the Old Veøy Church parish was changed around 1900, as Holm parish was established in 1901. In this process, the two very old churches Old Veøy Church and Rødven Stave Church were replaced by three fairly similar dragestil churches in 1907. Holm Church became the main church on the south side of the Langfjorden and the new Veøy Church was the main church to the north of the fjord. Both of those churches were designed by Karl Norum. At the same time, a new Rødven Chapel (as it originally was called) was designed by Jens Zetlitz Monrad Kielland was built about 40 metres (130 ft) to the north, just across the road from the old Rødven Stave Church to serve as an annex chapel for the new Holm Church. After the new Rødven Chapel was completed, the old stave church was closed and turned into a museum. Later, the Rødven chapel was upgraded in status to a parish church and renamed Rødven Church.

== Media gallery ==
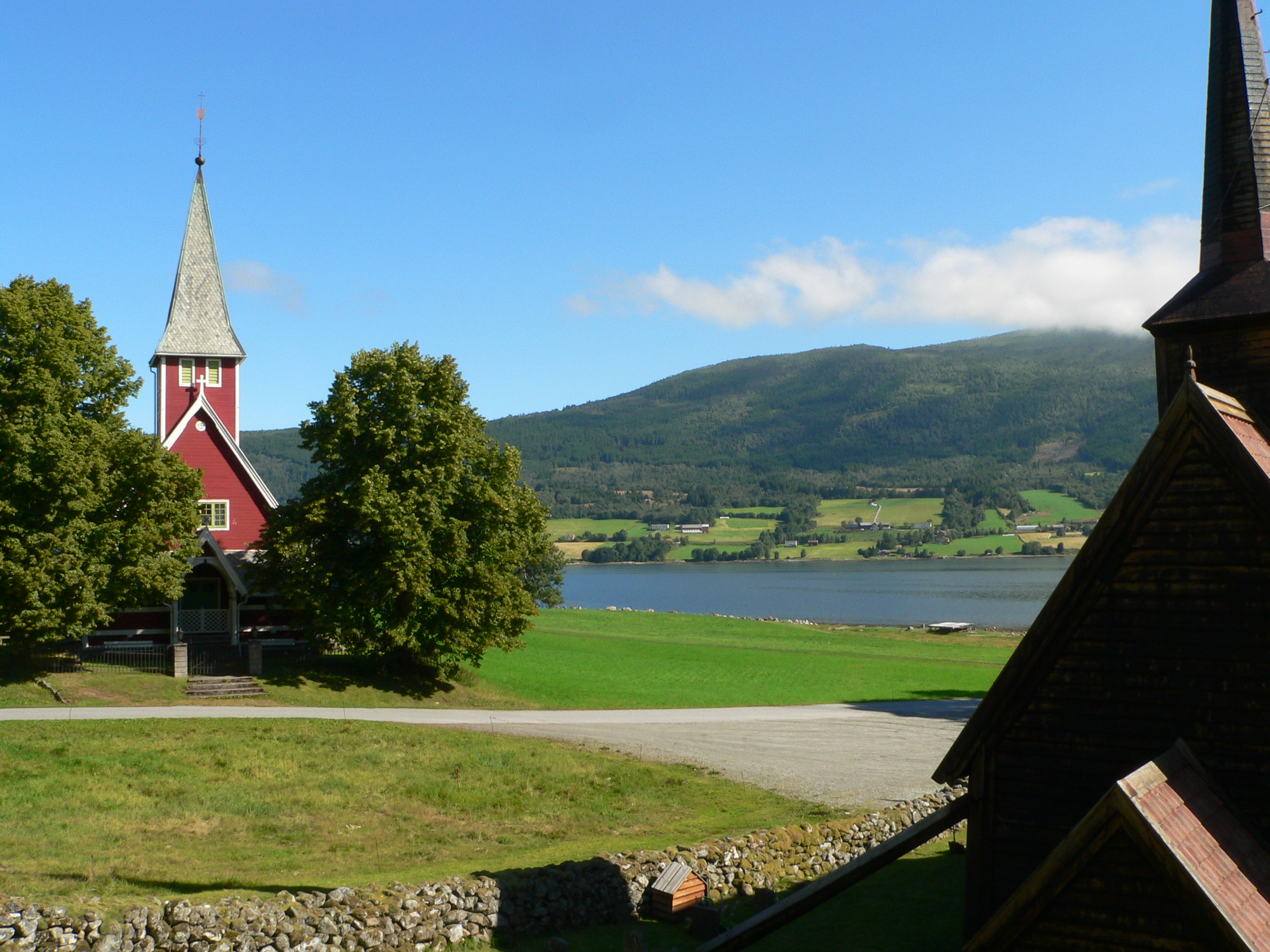

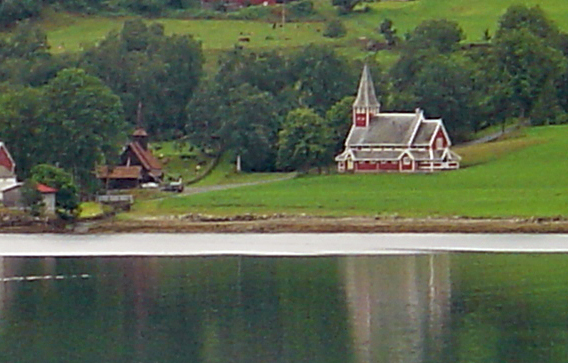

== See also ==
- List of churches in Møre
