= Voll Municipality =

Former municipality in Møre og Romsdal, Norway

Voll Municipality Voll herad
- Former municipality
- Vold herred (historic name)
- View of Innfjorden (c. 1948)

- Møre og Romsdal within Norway

- Voll within Møre og Romsdal
- Coordinates: 62°32′05″N 07°26′33″E
- Country: Norway
- County: Møre og Romsdal
- District: Romsdal
- Established: 1 Jan 1874
  - Preceded by: Eid og Voll Municipality
- Disestablished: 1 Jan 1964
  - Succeeded by: Rauma Municipality
- Administrative centre: Måndalen

Government
  - Mayor (1959–1963): Ivar Raknem (Sp)

Area (upon dissolution)
  - Total: 260.8 km^{2} (100.7 sq mi)
  - Rank: #313 in Norway
- Highest elevation: 1,786 m (5,860 ft)

Population (1963)
  - Total: 1,135
  - Rank: #592 in Norway
  - Density: 4.4/km^{2} (11/sq mi)
  - Change (10 years): ▲ +0.6%
- Demonym: Vollsokning

Official language
  - Norwegian form: Nynorsk
- Time zone: UTC+01:00 (CET)
  - Summer (DST): UTC+02:00 (CEST)
- ISO 3166 code: NO-1537

Voll is a former municipality in Møre og Romsdal county, Norway. The 260.8-square-kilometre (100.7 sq mi) municipality existed from 1874 until its dissolution in 1964. The area is now part of Rauma Municipality in the traditional district of Romsdal. The administrative centre was the village of Måndalen which is also where the main Voll Church is located.

Prior to its dissolution in 1964, the 260.8-square-kilometre (100.7 sq mi) municipality was the 313th largest by area out of the 689 municipalities in Norway. Voll Municipality was the 592nd most populous municipality in Norway with a population of about 1,135. The municipality's population density was 4.4 inhabitants per square kilometre (11/sq mi) and its population had increased by 0.6% over the previous 10-year period.

== General information ==
The municipality of Voll was established on 1 January 1874 when the old Eid og Voll Municipality was divided into two: Eid Municipality (population: 1,048) on the northeast side of the Romsdalsfjorden and Voll Municipality (population: 695) on the other side of the fjord.

During the 1960s, there were many municipal mergers across Norway due to the work of the Schei Committee. On 1 January 1964, a large municipal merger took place. The following places were merged to form the new Rauma Municipality on that date:

- all of Voll Municipality (population: 1,163)
- all of Eid Municipality (population: 381)
- all of Grytten Municipality (population: 3,683)
- all of Hen Municipality (population: 1,663)
- the southern part of Veøy Municipality (population: 1,400)

=== Name ===
The municipality (originally the parish) is named after the old Voll farm (Old Norse: Vǫllr) since the first Voll Church was built there. The name comes from the word vǫllr which means "meadow" or "field". Historically, the name of the municipality was spelled Vold. On 3 November 1917, a royal resolution changed the spelling of the name of the municipality to Voll.

=== Churches ===
The Church of Norway had one parish (sokn) within Voll Municipality. At the time of the municipal dissolution, it was part of the Eid prestegjeld and the Indre Romsdal prosti (deanery) in the Diocese of Nidaros.

Churches in Voll Municipality
Parish (sokn)	Church name	Location of the church	Year built
Voll	Voll Church	Voll	1896
Voll	Innfjorden Chapel	Innfjorden	1897

== Geography ==
The municipality encompassed the Måndalen and Innfjorden valleys west of the Romsdalsfjorden in the west-central part of the present-day Rauma Municipality. The highest point in the municipality was the 1,786-metre (5,860 ft) tall mountain Finnan, on the border with Grytten Municipality. Veøy Municipality and Eid Municipality were to the north, Grytten Municipality was to the east, Norddal Municipality was to the south, and Stordal Municipality and Tresfjord Municipality were to the west.

== Government ==
While it existed, Voll Municipality was responsible for primary education (through 10th grade), outpatient health services, senior citizen services, welfare and other social services, zoning, economic development, and municipal roads and utilities. The municipality was governed by a municipal council of directly elected representatives. The mayor was indirectly elected by a vote of the municipal council. The municipality was under the jurisdiction of the Frostating Court of Appeal.

=== Municipal council ===
The municipal council (Heradsstyre) of Voll Municipality was made up of 17 representatives that were elected to four year terms. The tables below show the historical composition of the council by political party.

Voll heradsstyre 1959–1963
Party name (in Nynorsk)	Number of representatives
Labour Party (Arbeidarpartiet)	5
Local List(s) (Lokale lister)	12
Total number of members:	17

Voll heradsstyre 1955–1959
Party name (in Nynorsk)	Number of representatives
Labour Party (Arbeidarpartiet)	5
Local List(s) (Lokale lister)	12
Total number of members:	17

Voll heradsstyre 1951–1955
Party name (in Nynorsk)	Number of representatives
Labour Party (Arbeidarpartiet)	2
Local List(s) (Lokale lister)	14
Total number of members:	16

Voll heradsstyre 1947–1951
Party name (in Nynorsk)	Number of representatives
Labour Party (Arbeidarpartiet)	4
Local List(s) (Lokale lister)	12
Total number of members:	16

Voll heradsstyre 1945–1947
Party name (in Nynorsk)	Number of representatives
Labour Party (Arbeidarpartiet)	6
Local List(s) (Lokale lister)	10
Total number of members:	16

Voll heradsstyre 1937–1941*
Party name (in Nynorsk)	Number of representatives
Local List(s) (Lokale lister)	16
Total number of members:	16
Note: Due to the German occupation of Norway during World War II, no elections were held for new municipal councils until after the war ended in 1945.

=== Mayors ===
The mayor (Nynorsk: ordførar) of Voll Municipality was the political leader of the municipality and the chairperson of the municipal council. The following people have held this position:

- 1874–1877: Knud Vik
- 1878–1879: P. Christian Sæbø
- 1880–1883: Knud Vik
- 1884–1884: E. Sæbø
- 1887–1889: Knud Vik
- 1890–1907: Jacob Bøe
- 1908–1919: Ole Otterholm
- 1920–1931: Knut L. Venås
- 1931–1942: Olav O. Oterholm
- 1942–1945: Edvard Engen
- 1946–1948: Einar Moen
- 1948–1952: Olav O. Oterholm
- 1952–1959: Kennet Bruaseth
- 1959–1963: Ivar Raknem (Sp)

== See also ==
- List of former municipalities of Norway
