= Rauma Municipality =

Municipality in Møre og Romsdal, Norway

Rauma Municipality Rauma kommune
- Municipality
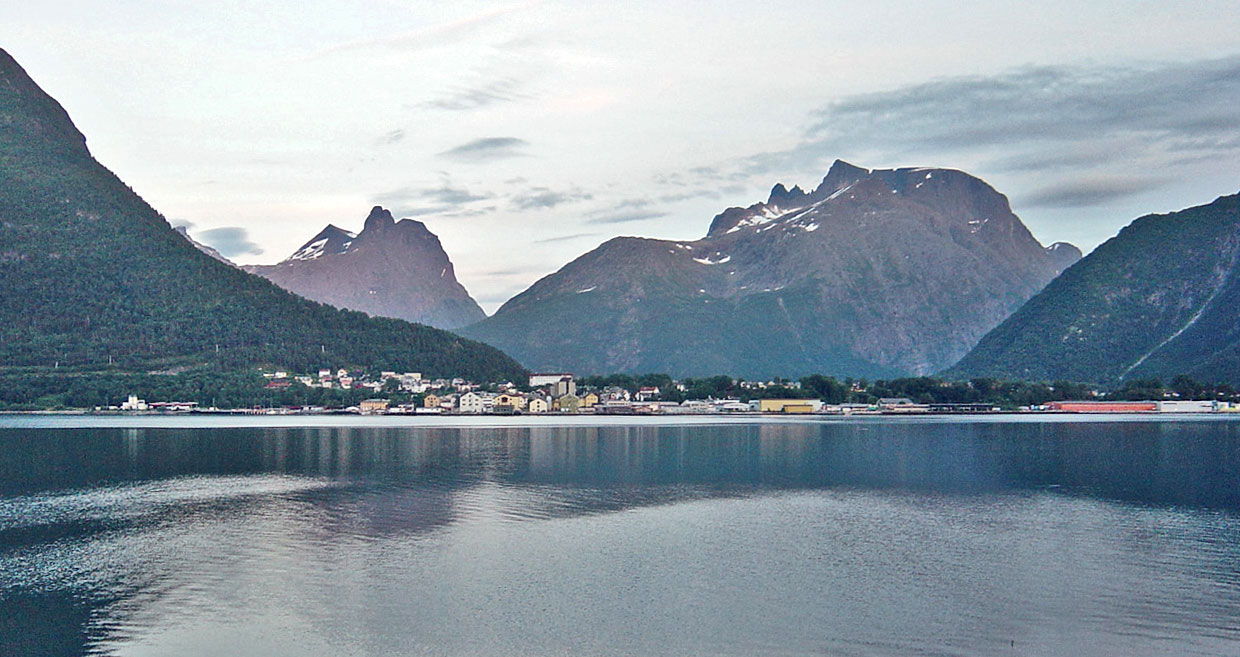
- View of Åndalsnes in Rauma

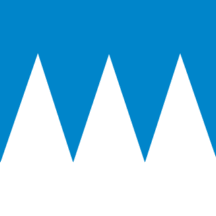
- Flag Coat of arms

- Møre og Romsdal within Norway

- Rauma within Møre og Romsdal
- Coordinates: 62°30′17″N 07°46′55″E
- Country: Norway
- County: Møre og Romsdal
- District: Romsdal
- Established: 1 Jan 1964
  - Preceded by: Eid, Grytten, Hen, Voll, & Veøy municipalities
- Administrative centre: Åndalsnes

Government
  - Mayor (2019): Yvonne Wold (SV)

Area
  - Total: 1,449.26 km^{2} (559.56 sq mi)
  - Land: 1,390.18 km^{2} (536.75 sq mi)
  - Water: 59.08 km^{2} (22.81 sq mi) 4.1%
  - Rank: #61 in Norway
- Highest elevation: 1,998.73 m (6,557.5 ft)

Population (2024)
  - Total: 7,299
  - Rank: #141 in Norway
  - Density: 5/km^{2} (13/sq mi)
  - Change (10 years): ▼ −2.1%
- Demonym: Raumaværing

Official language
  - Norwegian form: Neutral
- Time zone: UTC+01:00 (CET)
  - Summer (DST): UTC+02:00 (CEST)
- ISO 3166 code: NO-1539
- Website: Official website

Rauma is a municipality in Møre og Romsdal county, Norway. It is part of the traditional district of Romsdal. The administrative centre is the town of Åndalsnes. Other settlements in Rauma include the villages of Måndalen, Innfjorden, Veblungsnes, Verma, Isfjorden, Eidsbygda, Rødven, Åfarnes, and Mittet. Most settlement in the municipality is located along the fjords and in the Romsdalen valley.

The municipality surrounds part of the southern end of Romsdalsfjorden and the Isfjorden and it also includes the Romsdalen valley and Romsdalsalpene mountains. In the lower part of the valleys and around Romsdal Fjord and Rødvenfjorden are driven agriculture with emphasis on livestock. The clothing industry has traditionally been a dominant industry in the municipality, especially in Isfjorden. In the summer, Rauma has a fairly large amount of tourist traffic. The top tourist attractions include mountain climbing/hiking, salmon fishing, Trollstigen, and the historic Rødven Stave Church.

The 1,449-square-kilometre (559 sq mi) municipality is the 61st largest by area out of the 357 municipalities in Norway. Rauma Municipality is the 141st most populous municipality in Norway with a population of 7,299. The municipality's population density is 5 inhabitants per square kilometre (13/sq mi) and its population has decreased by 2.1% over the previous 10-year period.

== General information ==
The municipality of Rauma was established on 1 January 1964 when the following neighboring municipalities were merged together:

- Eid Municipality (population: 381)
- Grytten Municipality (population: 3,683)
- Hen Municipality (population: 1,663)
- Voll Municipality (population: 1,163)
- the southern part of Veøy Municipality (population: 1,400)

On 1 January 2021, the 53-square-kilometre (20 sq mi) Vågstranda area in the northwestern part of Rauma Municipality was transferred to the neighboring Vestnes Municipality.

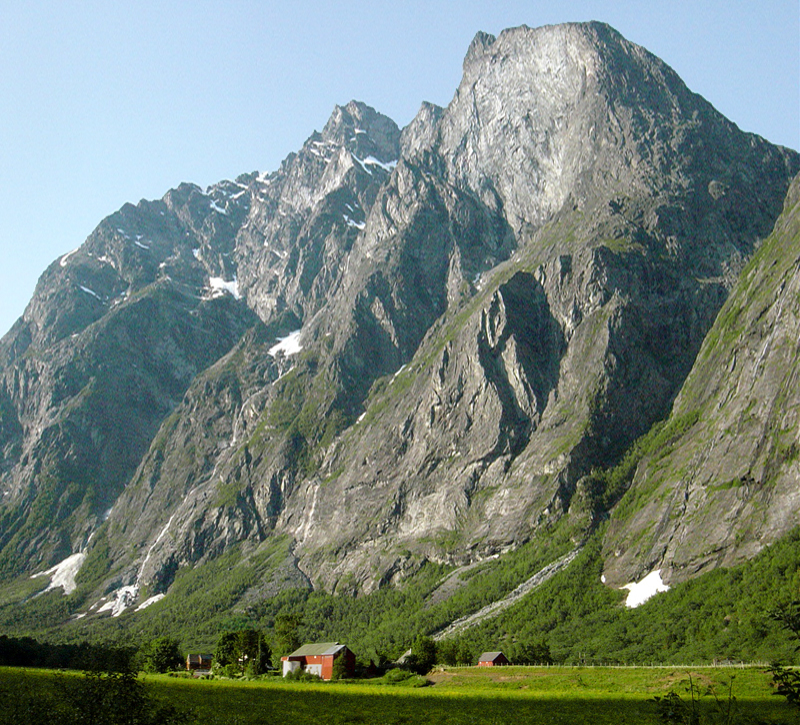
View of Marstein in the Romsdalen valley

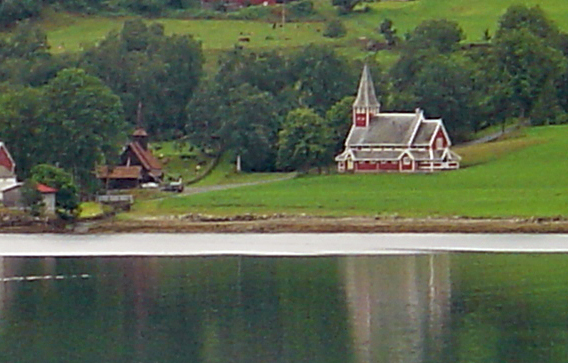
View of the two churches in Rødven

=== Name ===
The municipality is named after the Rauma River (Old Norse: Raumr), which flows through the Romsdalen valley into the Romsdal Fjord. It is uncertain if the fjord is named after the river or the river is named after the fjord. The name Rauma likely comes from the word raum which has an unknown meaning, or it could come from the word raumr which means "roaring waterfall".

=== Coat of arms ===
The coat of arms was granted on 4 November 1983. The official blazon is "Azure, three piles issuant from base argent" (Norwegian: I blått tre opprette sølv spisser). This means the arms have a blue field (background) and the charge is three piles pointing upwards from the base of the shield. The charge has a tincture of argent which means it is commonly colored white, but if it is made out of metal, then silver is used. The design was chosen to represent the sky and three local mountains (Vengetindane, Trolltindane and Romsdalshornet). The arms were designed by Jarle Skuseth. The municipal flag has the same design as the coat of arms.

=== Churches ===
The Church of Norway has six parishes (sokn) within Rauma Municipality. It is part of the Indre Romsdal prosti (deanery) in the Diocese of Møre.

Churches in Rauma Municipality
Parish (sokn)	Church name	Location of the church	Year built
Eid og Holm	Eid Church	Eidsbygda	1796
Eid og Holm	Holm Church	Holm	1907
Eid og Holm	Rødven Church	Rødven	1907
Eid og Holm	Rødven Stave Church	Rødven	c. 1200
Grytten	Grytten Church	Veblungsnes	1829
Hen	Hen Church	Isfjorden	1831
Kors	Kors Church	Marstein in Romsdalen	1797
Voll	Voll Church	Måndalen	1896
Voll	Innfjorden Chapel	Innfjorden	1976
Øverdalen	Øverdalen Church	Verma	1902

== Geography ==
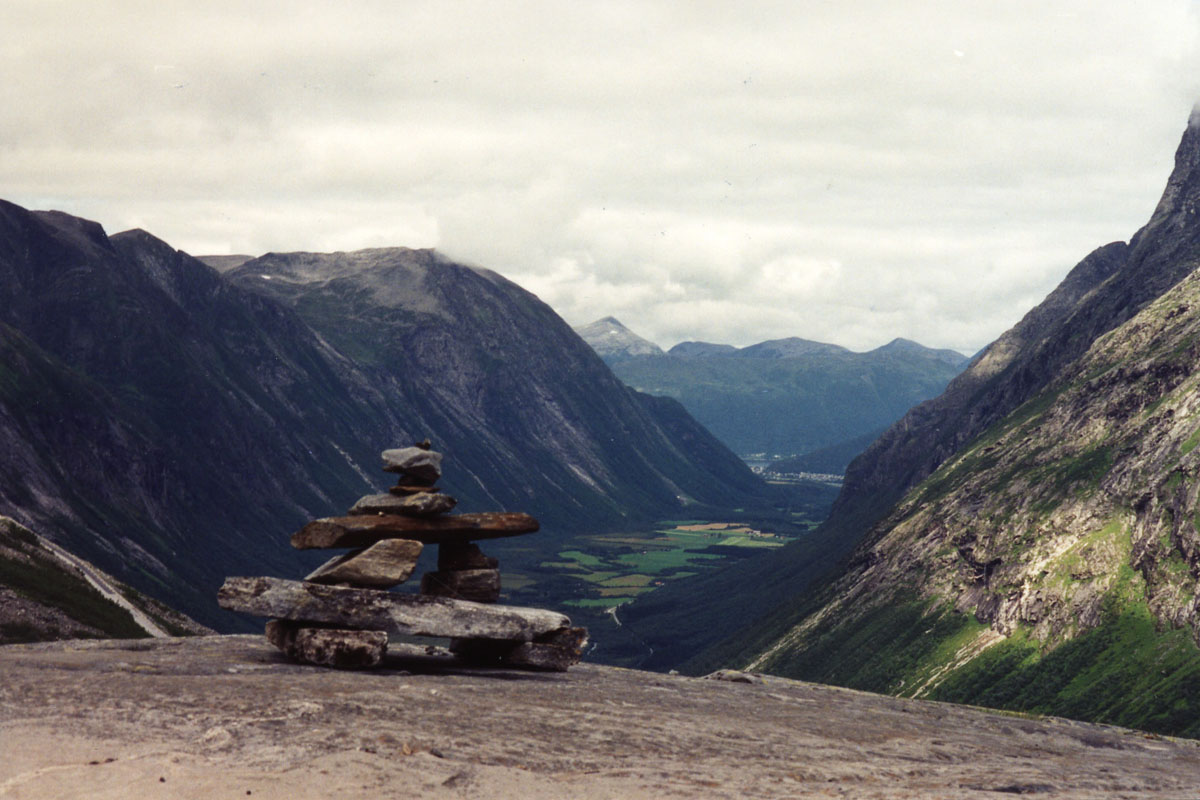
View of Åndalsnes from the top of Trollstigen

The municipality surrounds the eastern part of Romsdal Fjord, Isfjorden, and Rødvenfjorden, and it is south of the Langfjorden. It also surrounds the Romsdalen valley and the Rauma River from the mouth to the Innlandet county border.

The Kyrkjetaket and Gjuratinden mountains lie in the northeastern part of the municipality. The mountains Dønttinden, Mannen, Romsdalshornet, Store Trolltinden, Trollryggen, Store Venjetinden, and the Troll Wall are all in the central part of the municipality in the Romsdalsalpene mountain range. The mountains Karitinden, Høgstolen, and Puttegga are located in the southwestern part of the municipality. Part of Reinheimen National Park lies within the municipality. The highest point in the municipality is the 1,998.73-metre (6,557.5 ft) tall mountain Puttegga.

== Climate ==
The municipality has a varied climate thanks to its complicated terrain. Places along the fjord have a temperate oceanic climate (Cfb in the Köppen climate classificaton), the inland valleys have a humid continental climate (Köppen: Dfb) and the mountains have a wet turndra climate (Köppen: ET).

=== Åndalsnes ===
Åndalsnes has an temperate oceanic climate (Cfb in the Köppen climate classification), with relatively mild winters, cool summers and precipitation year round. Late spring/early summer is the time of the year with the least precipitation, while the winter is the wettest. As Ånsdalsnes is sheltered in the fjord, it receives less precipitation than places further out to the coast like Molde. Åndalsnes experiences large temperature swings during the winter. Days with temperatures of below -10°C due to temperature inversions can quickly be followed up by temperatures exceeding 10°C and even 15°C due to Föhn winds from the south-west.

Climate data for Åndalsnes - Kamshaugen 1991–2020 (3 m)
Month	Jan	Feb	Mar	Apr	May	Jun	Jul	Aug	Sep	Oct	Nov	Dec	Year
Daily mean °C (°F)	1.1 (34.0)	0.8 (33.4)	2.7 (36.9)	6.1 (43.0)	9.2 (48.6)	12.1 (53.8)	14.9 (58.8)	14.5 (58.1)	11.4 (52.5)	7.0 (44.6)	3.9 (39.0)	1.2 (34.2)	7.1 (44.7)
Average precipitation mm (inches)	123 (4.8)	109 (4.3)	106 (4.2)	67 (2.6)	68 (2.7)	84 (3.3)	79 (3.1)	92 (3.6)	130 (5.1)	129 (5.1)	112 (4.4)	149 (5.9)	1,248 (49.1)
Source: yr.no history

== Transportation ==
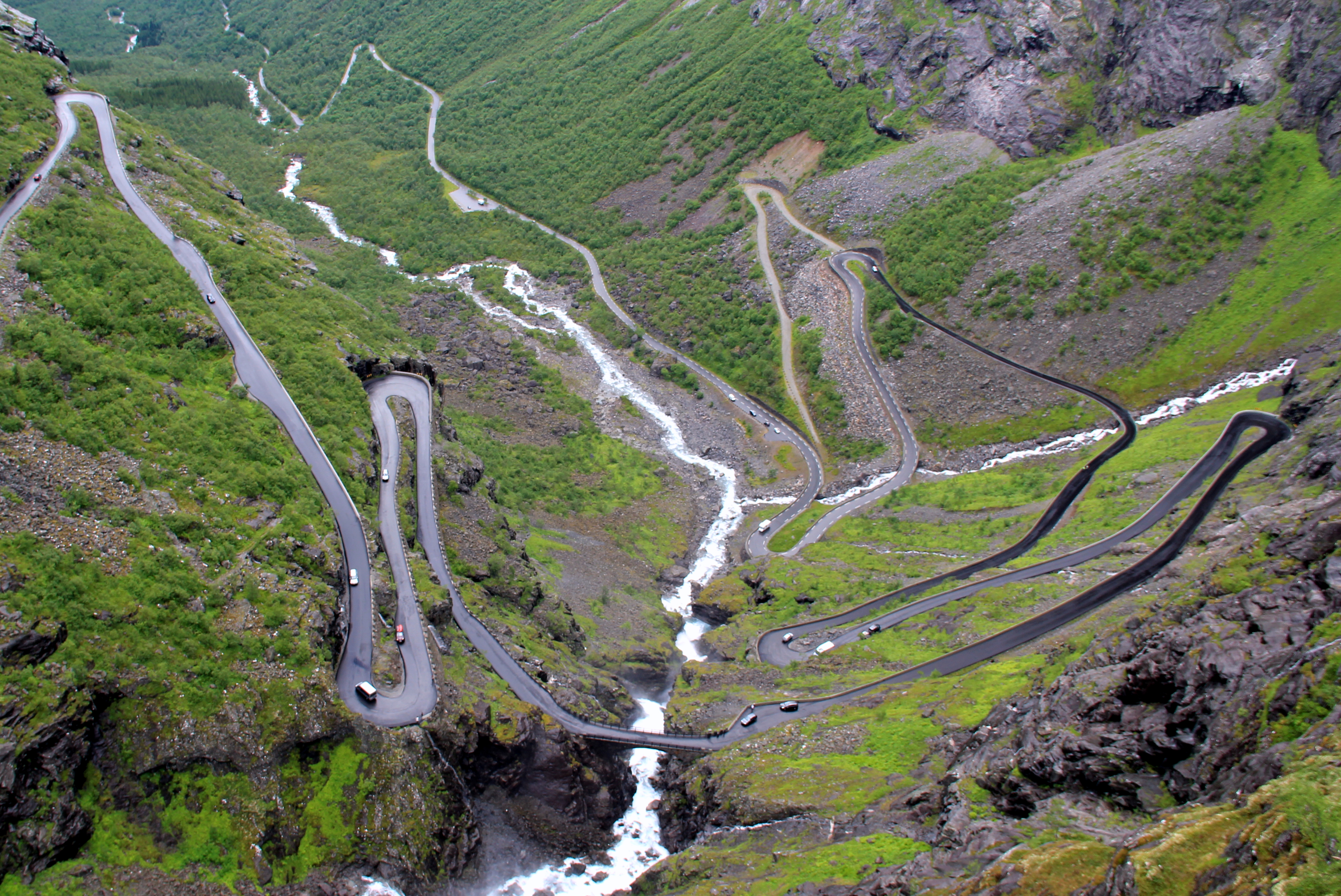
View of the Trollstigen road

European Route E136, Norwegian County Road 63, and Norwegian County Road 64 all pass through the municipality. The Trollstigen road is part of County Road 63 in Rauma, and it is a famous tourist attraction due to the many hairpin turns on the steep road.

The Rauma railway line also runs through the municipality, over the Kylling Bridge, and terminates at Åndalsnes Station. The nearest airports are Ålesund Airport, Vigra which is 135 kilometres (84 mi) by road from Åndalsnes and Molde Airport which is 55 kilometres (34 mi) by road plus a road ferry.

== Government ==
Rauma Municipality is responsible for primary education (through 10th grade), outpatient health services, senior citizen services, welfare and other social services, zoning, economic development, and municipal roads and utilities. The municipality is governed by a municipal council of directly elected representatives. The mayor is indirectly elected by a vote of the municipal council. The municipality is under the jurisdiction of the Nordmøre og Romsdal District Court and the Frostating Court of Appeal.

Rauma joined Nordmøre Interkommunale Renovasjonsselskap to handle its waste management in 1999. It switched to Romsdalshalvøya Interkommunale Renovasjonsselskap in 2019. Since the 1980s, the operations waste collection in Rauma has been subcontracted to J.O. Moen.

=== Municipal council ===
The municipal council (Kommunestyre) of Rauma Municipality is made up of 27 representatives that are elected to four year terms. The tables below show the current and historical composition of the council by political party.

Rauma kommunestyre 2023–2027
Party name (in Norwegian)	Number of representatives
Labour Party (Arbeiderpartiet)	2
Progress Party (Fremskrittspartiet)	4
Conservative Party (Høyre)	3
Industry and Business Party (Industri‑ og Næringspartiet)	1
Centre Party (Senterpartiet)	5
Socialist Left Party (Sosialistisk Venstreparti)	12
Total number of members:	27

Rauma kommunestyre 2019–2023
Party name (in Norwegian)	Number of representatives
Labour Party (Arbeiderpartiet)	5
Progress Party (Fremskrittspartiet)	1
Green Party (Miljøpartiet De Grønne)	1
Conservative Party (Høyre)	6
Christian Democratic Party (Kristelig Folkeparti)	1
Pensioners' Party (Pensjonistpartiet)	1
Centre Party (Senterpartiet)	5
Socialist Left Party (Sosialistisk Venstreparti)	7
Total number of members:	27

Rauma kommunestyre 2015–2019
Party name (in Norwegian)	Number of representatives
Labour Party (Arbeiderpartiet)	5
Progress Party (Fremskrittspartiet)	2
Conservative Party (Høyre)	8
Christian Democratic Party (Kristelig Folkeparti)	2
Centre Party (Senterpartiet)	7
Socialist Left Party (Sosialistisk Venstreparti)	2
Liberal Party (Venstre)	1
Total number of members:	27

Rauma kommunestyre 2011–2015
Party name (in Norwegian)	Number of representatives
Labour Party (Arbeiderpartiet)	6
Progress Party (Fremskrittspartiet)	4
Conservative Party (Høyre)	5
Christian Democratic Party (Kristelig Folkeparti)	3
Centre Party (Senterpartiet)	6
Socialist Left Party (Sosialistisk Venstreparti)	1
Liberal Party (Venstre)	2
Total number of members:	27

Rauma kommunestyre 2007–2011
Party name (in Norwegian)	Number of representatives
Labour Party (Arbeiderpartiet)	6
Progress Party (Fremskrittspartiet)	4
Conservative Party (Høyre)	3
Christian Democratic Party (Kristelig Folkeparti)	3
Centre Party (Senterpartiet)	6
Socialist Left Party (Sosialistisk Venstreparti)	2
Liberal Party (Venstre)	2
Rauma Party (Raumapartiet)	1
Total number of members:	27

Rauma kommunestyre 2003–2007
Party name (in Norwegian)	Number of representatives
Labour Party (Arbeiderpartiet)	6
Progress Party (Fremskrittspartiet)	5
Conservative Party (Høyre)	3
Christian Democratic Party (Kristelig Folkeparti)	3
Centre Party (Senterpartiet)	5
Socialist Left Party (Sosialistisk Venstreparti)	3
Liberal Party (Venstre)	2
Total number of members:	27

Rauma kommunestyre 1999–2003
Party name (in Norwegian)	Number of representatives
Labour Party (Arbeiderpartiet)	11
Progress Party (Fremskrittspartiet)	4
Conservative Party (Høyre)	6
Christian Democratic Party (Kristelig Folkeparti)	6
Centre Party (Senterpartiet)	7
Liberal Party (Venstre)	3
Total number of members:	37

Rauma kommunestyre 1995–1999
Party name (in Norwegian)	Number of representatives
Labour Party (Arbeiderpartiet)	11
Progress Party (Fremskrittspartiet)	2
Conservative Party (Høyre)	5
Christian Democratic Party (Kristelig Folkeparti)	5
Centre Party (Senterpartiet)	10
Socialist Left Party (Sosialistisk Venstreparti)	2
Liberal Party (Venstre)	2
Total number of members:	37

Rauma kommunestyre 1991–1995
Party name (in Norwegian)	Number of representatives
Labour Party (Arbeiderpartiet)	11
Progress Party (Fremskrittspartiet)	3
Conservative Party (Høyre)	7
Christian Democratic Party (Kristelig Folkeparti)	7
Centre Party (Senterpartiet)	9
Socialist Left Party (Sosialistisk Venstreparti)	5
Liberal Party (Venstre)	3
Total number of members:	45

Rauma kommunestyre 1987–1991
Party name (in Norwegian)	Number of representatives
Labour Party (Arbeiderpartiet)	15
Progress Party (Fremskrittspartiet)	4
Conservative Party (Høyre)	9
Christian Democratic Party (Kristelig Folkeparti)	7
Centre Party (Senterpartiet)	5
Socialist Left Party (Sosialistisk Venstreparti)	2
Liberal Party (Venstre)	3
Total number of members:	45

Rauma kommunestyre 1983–1987
Party name (in Norwegian)	Number of representatives
Labour Party (Arbeiderpartiet)	15
Progress Party (Fremskrittspartiet)	3
Conservative Party (Høyre)	8
Christian Democratic Party (Kristelig Folkeparti)	8
Centre Party (Senterpartiet)	6
Socialist Left Party (Sosialistisk Venstreparti)	2
Liberal Party (Venstre)	3
Total number of members:	45

Rauma kommunestyre 1979–1983
Party name (in Norwegian)	Number of representatives
Labour Party (Arbeiderpartiet)	14
Conservative Party (Høyre)	10
Christian Democratic Party (Kristelig Folkeparti)	9
Centre Party (Senterpartiet)	8
Liberal Party (Venstre)	4
Total number of members:	45

Rauma kommunestyre 1975–1979
Party name (in Norwegian)	Number of representatives
Labour Party (Arbeiderpartiet)	14
Conservative Party (Høyre)	7
Christian Democratic Party (Kristelig Folkeparti)	10
New People's Party (Nye Folkepartiet)	1
Centre Party (Senterpartiet)	9
Socialist Left Party (Sosialistisk Venstreparti)	2
Liberal Party (Venstre)	2
Total number of members:	45

Rauma kommunestyre 1971–1975
Party name (in Norwegian)	Number of representatives
Labour Party (Arbeiderpartiet)	17
Conservative Party (Høyre)	5
Christian Democratic Party (Kristelig Folkeparti)	9
Centre Party (Senterpartiet)	10
Liberal Party (Venstre)	4
Total number of members:	45

Rauma kommunestyre 1967–1971
Party name (in Norwegian)	Number of representatives
Labour Party (Arbeiderpartiet)	15
Conservative Party (Høyre)	5
Christian Democratic Party (Kristelig Folkeparti)	9
Centre Party (Senterpartiet)	9
Socialist People's Party (Sosialistisk Folkeparti)	3
Liberal Party (Venstre)	4
Total number of members:	45

Rauma kommunestyre 1964–1967
Party name (in Norwegian)	Number of representatives
Labour Party (Arbeiderpartiet)	18
Conservative Party (Høyre)	4
Christian Democratic Party (Kristelig Folkeparti)	10
Centre Party (Senterpartiet)	9
Liberal Party (Venstre)	4
Total number of members:	45
Note: On 1 January 1964, Eid Municipality, Grytten Municipality, Hen Municipality, Voll Municipality, and part of Veøy Municipality were merged to form the new Rauma Municipality.

=== Mayors ===
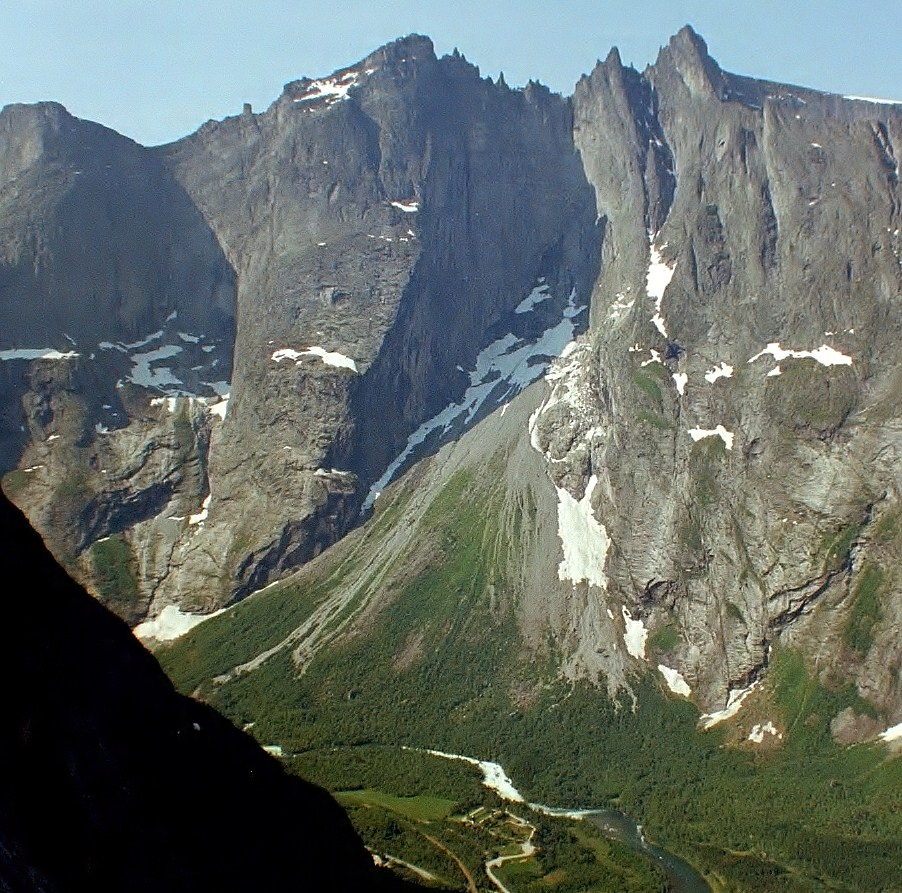
View of Trollveggen

The mayor (Norwegian: ordfører) of Rauma Municipality is the political leader of the municipality and the chairperson of the municipal council. Here is a list of people who have held this position:

- 1964–1971: Peder Mork (KrF)
- 1972–1973: Lars Ramstad (H)
- 1974–1985: Oddvar Morstøl (KrF)
- 1986–1987: Knut Hauge
- 1988–1989: Nils Valde (KrF)
- 1990–1991: Ole S. Dahle
- 1992–1993: Nils Valde (KrF)
- 1994–1999: Torbjørn Ådne Bruaset (Sp)
- 1999–2011: Torbjørn Rødstøl (Sp)
- 2011–2019: Lars Olav Hustad (H)
- 2019–present: Yvonne Wold (SV)

== Attractions ==
Rauma is frequently visited by tourists, especially due to the major sights:

- Trollveggen in Romsdalen valley
- Trollstigen road to Geiranger
- Rødven Stave Church (built around the year 1200)

== Notable people ==
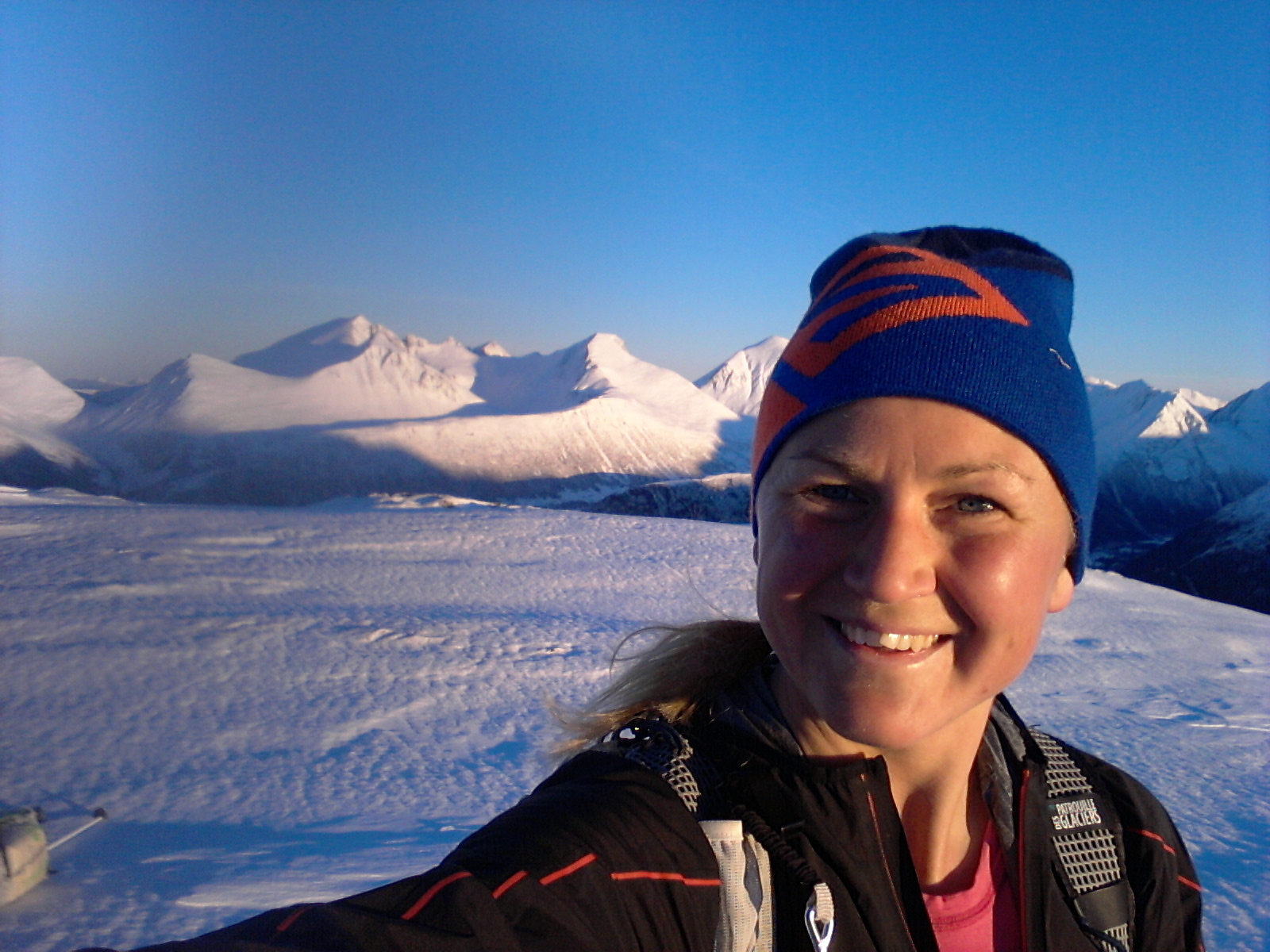
Ida Nilsson, 2016

- Mathias Soggemoen (1847 in Rauma – 1929), a railway worker and mountain climbing pioneer
- Kirsten Utheim Toverud (1890 in Veblungsnes – 1949), a pediatrician
- Arne Randers Heen (1905 in Hen, Møre og Romsdal – 1991), a mountain climber and member of the Norwegian resistance during WWII
- Nils Bølset (1928 in Veøy – 2015), a Norwegian diplomat in Germany, Turkey, and Australia
- Oddgeir Bruaset (born 1944 in Rauma), a journalist and non-fiction writer
- Ida Nilsson (born 1981), a Swedish long-distance runner, also competes in ski mountaineering
- Aksel Berget Skjølsvik (born 1987 in Åndalsnes), a former footballer with over 250 club caps
- Karoline Bjerkeli Grøvdal (born 1991 in Rauma), a middle-, long- and steeplechase runner
- Leo Skiri Østigård (born 1999 in Rauma), a professional footballer
