= Rødven Stave Church =

Church in Møre og Romsdal, Norway

- Rødven stavkyrkje
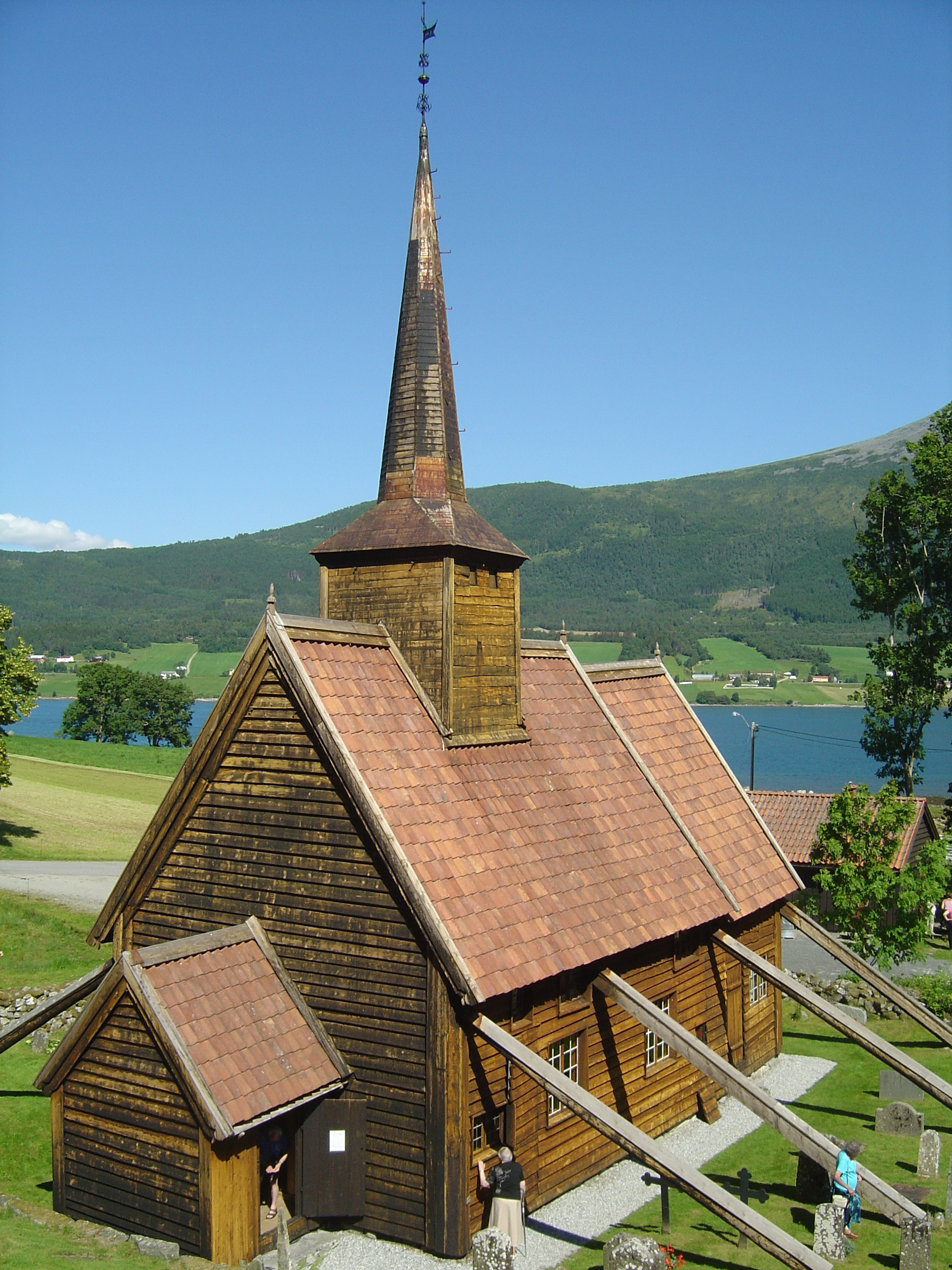
- View of the church (22 July 2006)
- Rødven Stave Church
- 62°37′27″N 7°29′37″E
- Location: Rauma Municipality, Møre og Romsdal
- Country: Norway
- Denomination: Church of Norway
- Previous denomination: Catholic Church
- Churchmanship: Evangelical Lutheran

History
- Status: Parish church
- Founded: c. 1100
- Consecrated: c. 1300

Architecture
- Functional status: Museum
- Architectural type: Long church
- Style: Møre-type stave church
- Completed: c. 1300 (726 years ago)
- Closed: 1907

Specifications
- Capacity: 100
- Materials: Wood

Administration
- Diocese: Møre bispedømme
- Deanery: Indre Romsdal prosti
- Parish: Eid og Holm
- Norwegian Cultural Heritage Site
- Type: Church
- Status: Automatically protected
- ID: 85333

Rødven Stave Church (Norwegian: Rødven stavkyrkje) is a former parish church (now a museum) of the Church of Norway in Rauma Municipality in Møre og Romsdal county, Norway. The stave church is located in the village of Rødven. It was a church in the Eid og Holm parish which is part of the Indre Romsdal prosti (deanery) in the Diocese of Møre. The brown, wooden church was built in a long church design during the 12th century by an unknown architect. The church seats about 100 people.

The church is considered a Møre-type stave church due to its structure and the exterior support posts that brace the walls. In 1907, a new Rødven Church was built across the street from the old church. Since 1907, Rødven Stave Church has not been regularly used and it has been owned by the Society for the Preservation of Norwegian Ancient Monuments. Although it is now a museum, it does have one worship service each year on Olsok, the eve of St. Olav's Day.

== History ==
The earliest existing historical records of the church date back to the year 1547, but the church was not new that year. The first church on the site was a wooden stave church that was likely built during the 1100s and it was an annex church that was subordinate to the Old Veøy Church parish. This church stood for nearly 200 years before being torn down and replaced with a new building. The new church was also a wooden stave church. It has a rectangular nave measuring 9 by 6.4 metres (30 ft × 21 ft) with a rectangular choir that measured 3.4 by 4.5 metres (11 ft × 15 ft) on the east end. There is a small tower on the roof of the nave. This new church was possibly built using some of the materials from the old church that stood on the site beforehand. The north portal with an ornately carved crucifix was likely reused in the new building from the old 12th-century building.

Around the year 1600, the old choir was torn down and a new choir was built to replace it. The new choir is about 3 metres (9.8 ft) wider than its predecessor, bringing the choir to the same width as the nave. Also during this renovation, the exterior corridors that encircled the building were removed. In 1651, a sacristy was added to the north side of the choir. In 1689, a strong storm blew the tower off the roof and damaged the roof. The roof was quickly fixed afterwards, but this was only meant to be a temporary fix. The church needed significant repairs which did not happen for over 20 years. In 1712, the church was significantly renovated and repaired by the lead builder Hans Knutsen from Molde. Structural repairs to the walls and roof were carried out. Exterior support beams were also added to help support the centuries-old structure. Beams were installed on all four corners plus two extra beams along each of the long walls. A new church porch was built on the west end of the building. The church also had a whole new roof and tower put on. Inside the church, a new altar and pulpit were built as well.

The parish structure in the Old Veøy Church parish was changed around 1900, as Holm parish was established in 1901. In this process, the two very old churches Old Veøy Church and Rødven Stave Church were replaced by three fairly similar dragestil churches in 1907. Holm Church became the main church on the south side of the Langfjorden and the new Veøy Church was the main church to the north of the fjord. Both of those churches were designed by Karl Norum. At the same time, a new Rødven Chapel (as it originally was called) was designed by Jens Zetlitz Monrad Kielland was built about 40 metres (130 ft) to the north, just across the road from the old Rødven Stave Church. The new Rødven Chapel was built to serve as an annex chapel for the new Holm Church. After the new Rødven Chapel was completed, the old stave church was closed and removed from regular use. In 1908, the old stave church was purchased by the Society for the Preservation of Norwegian Ancient Monuments which runs it as a museum, although the parish still uses the church building on special occasions. Later, the new Rødven Chapel was upgraded in status to a parish church and renamed Rødven Church.

An archeological survey was carried out in 1962–1963 which was led by Håkon Christie. During this excavation, evidence was found of posts for an older building on the same location, supporting the conclusion that this present church was not the first church on the site. There was also an abundance of artifacts found under the floor of the building.

== Media gallery ==
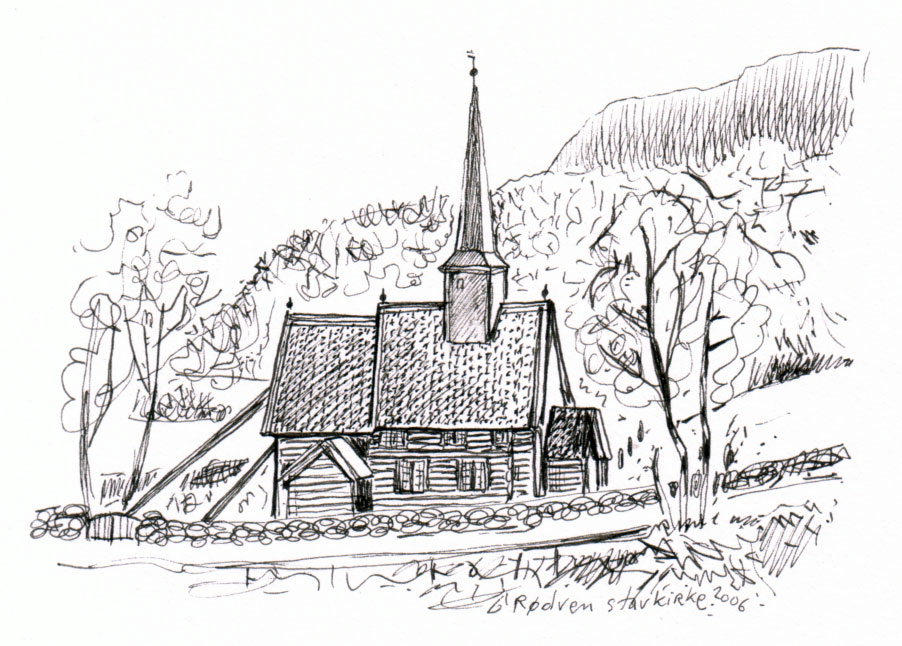

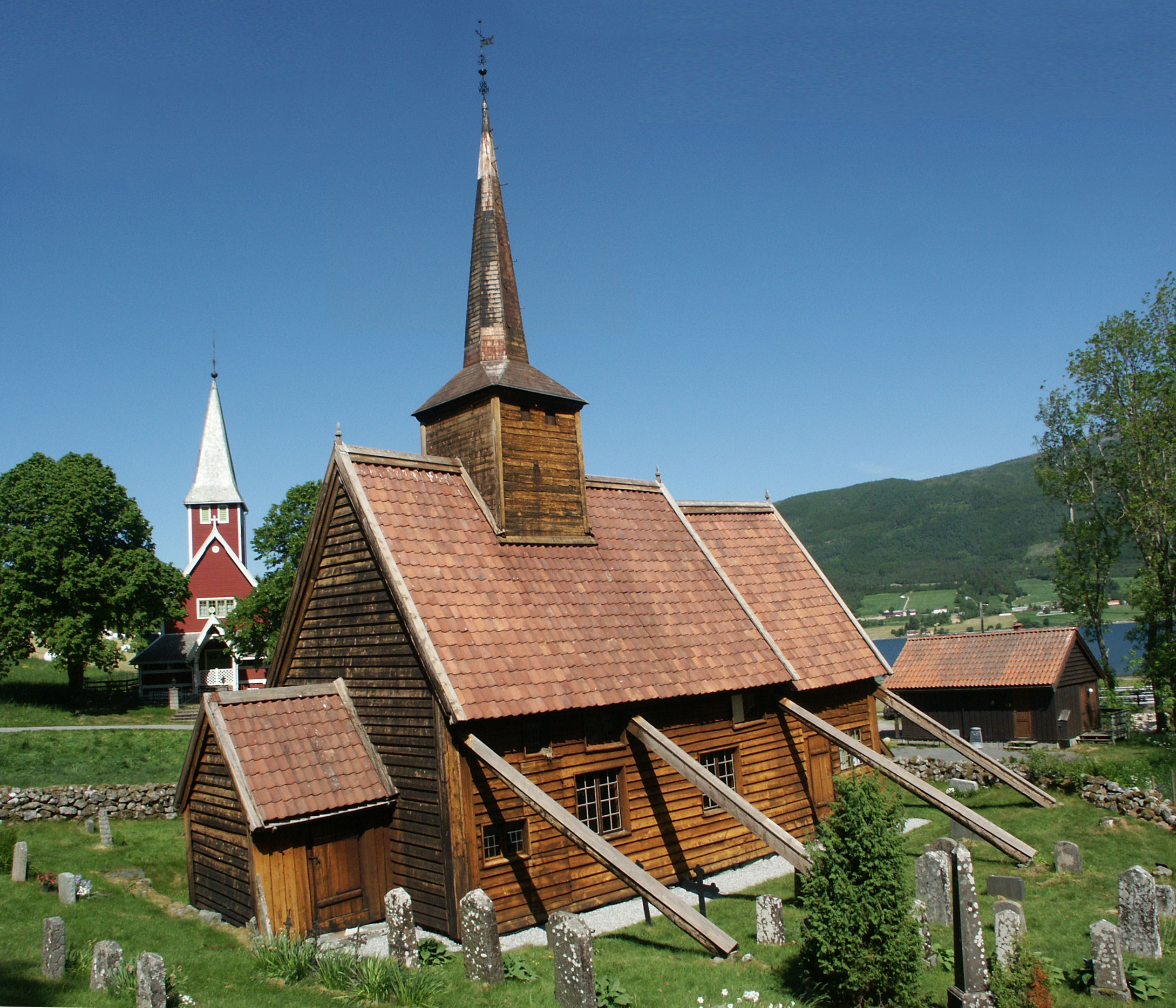
Exterior of the church

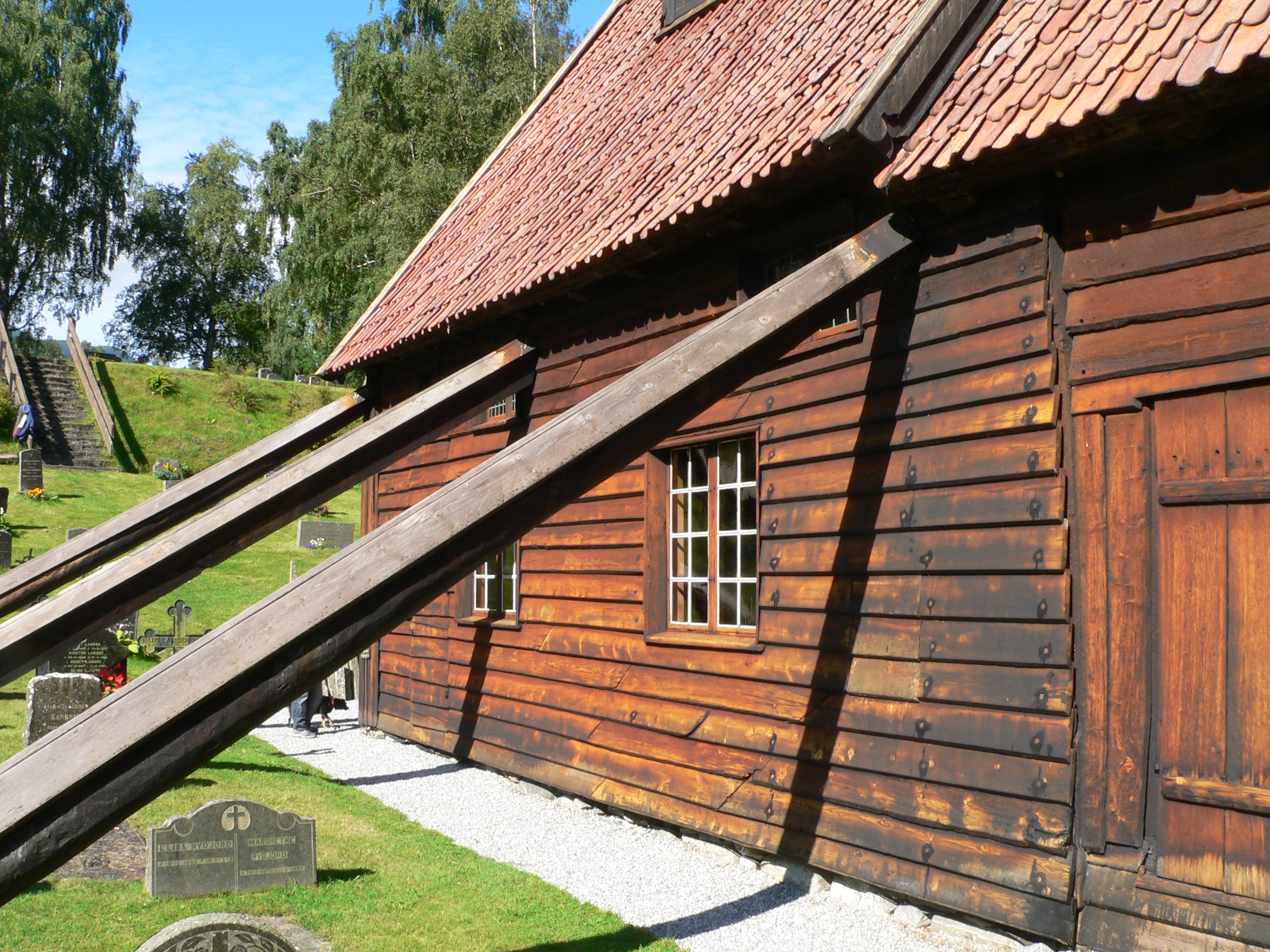
Exterior support posts

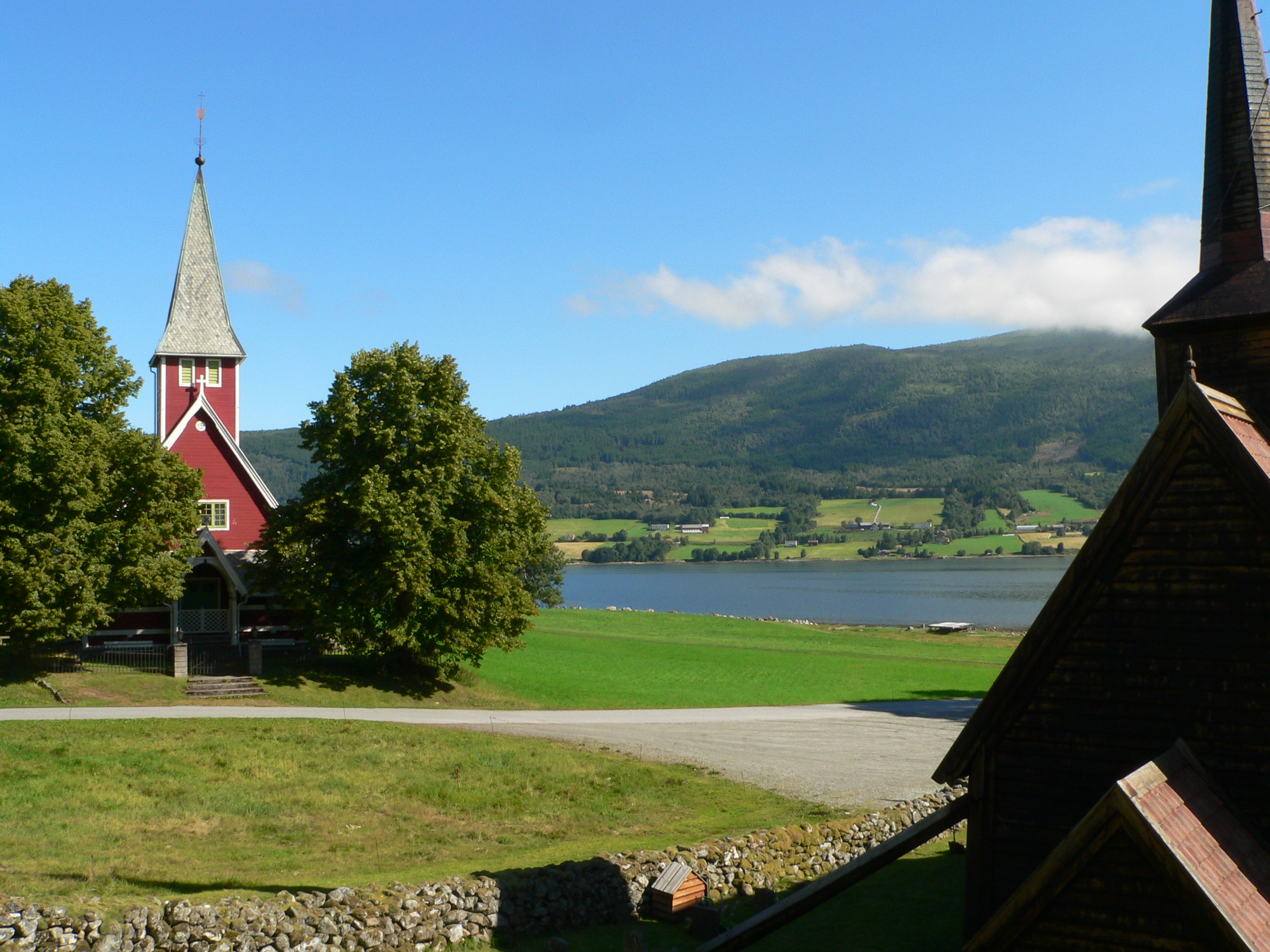
Exterior with view of Rødven Church in the background

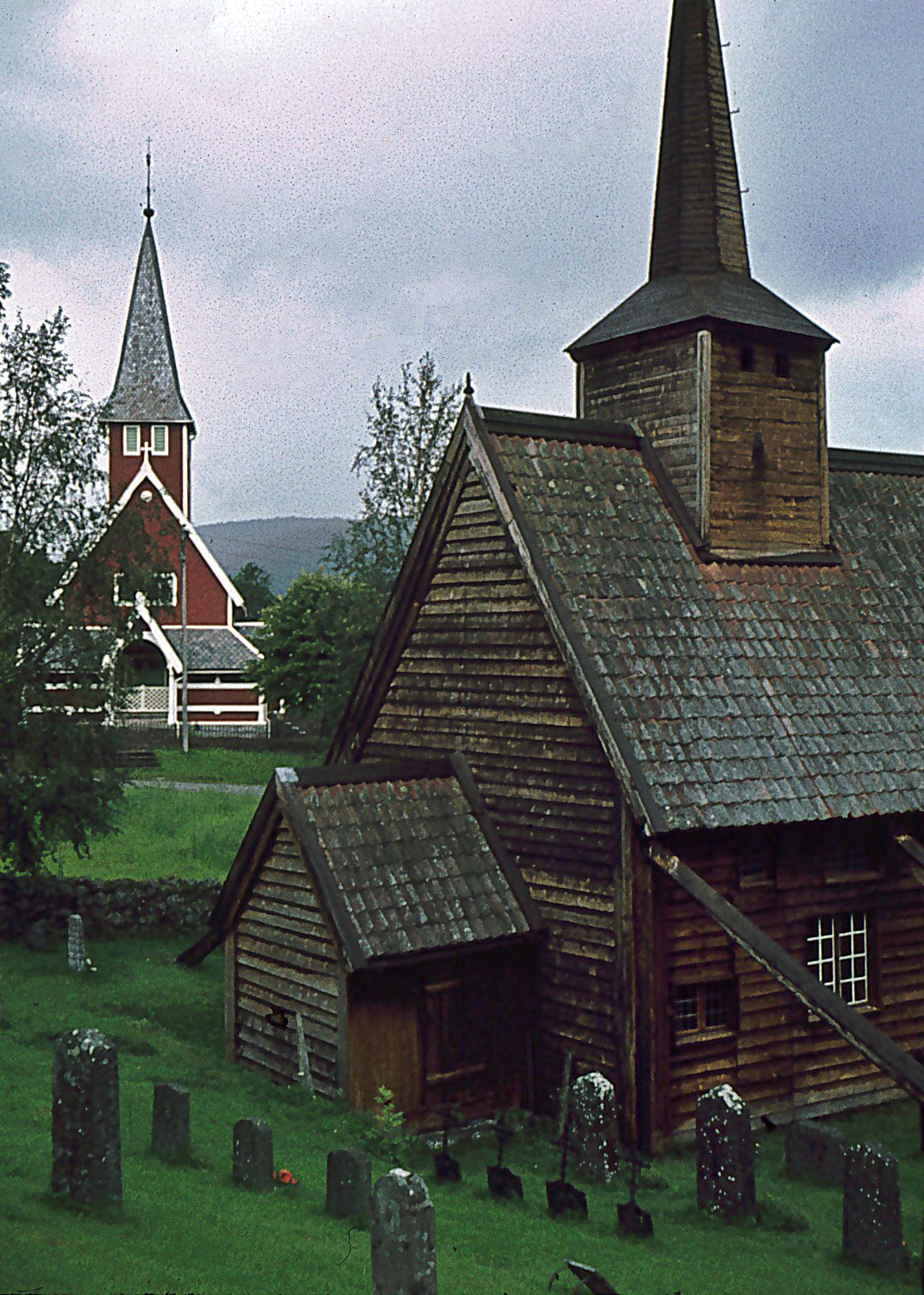

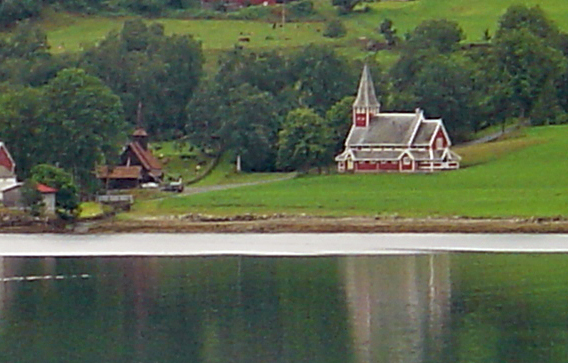

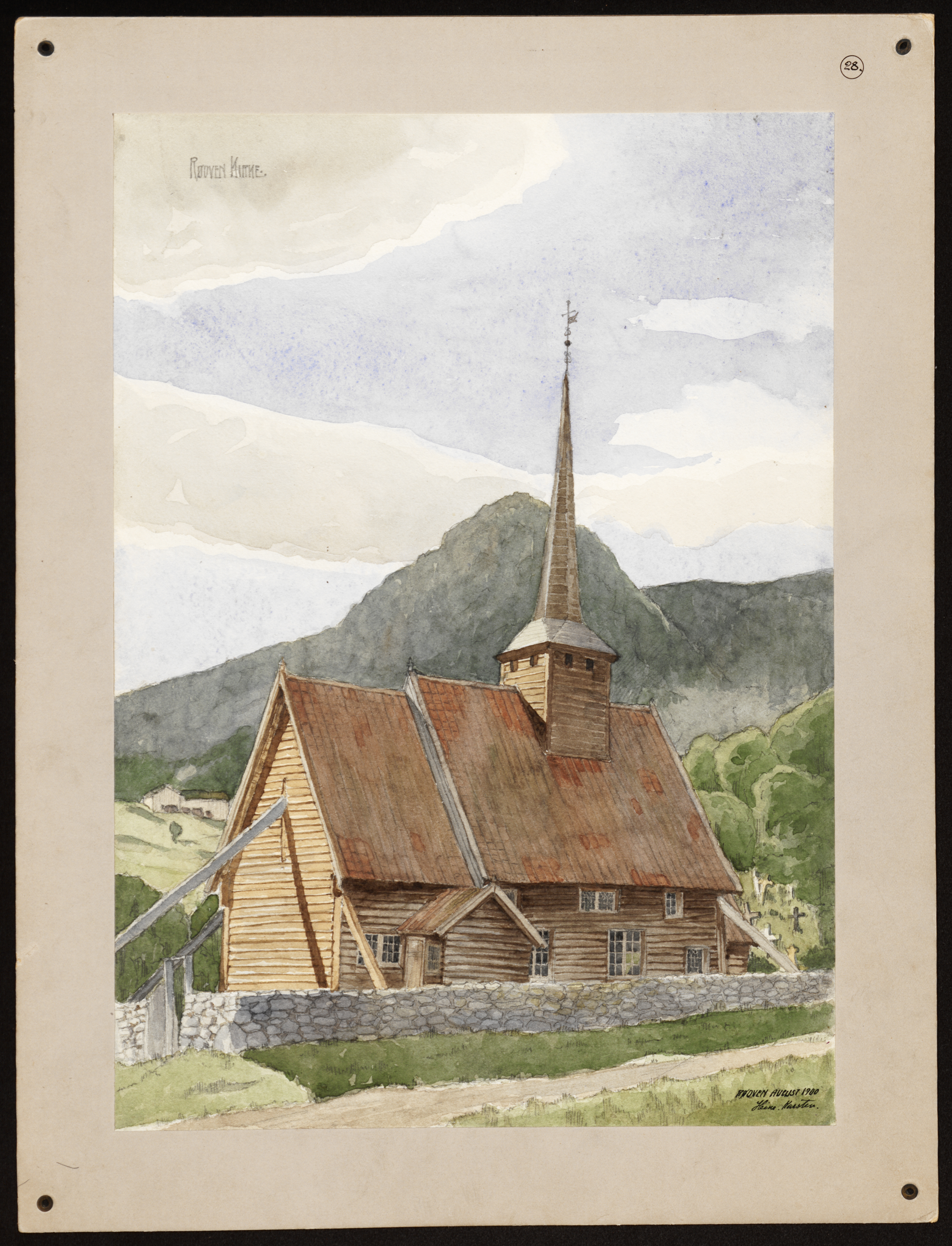

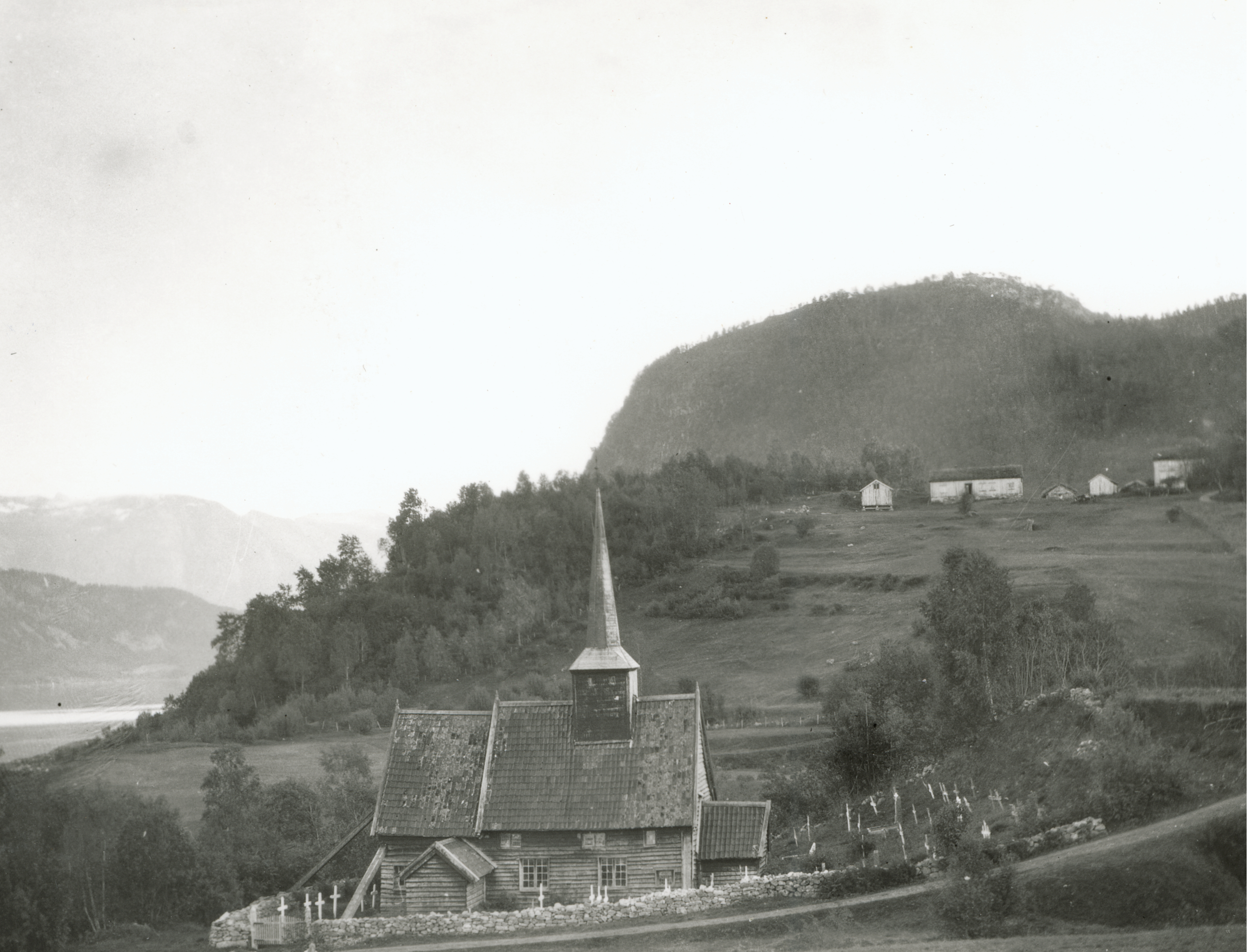

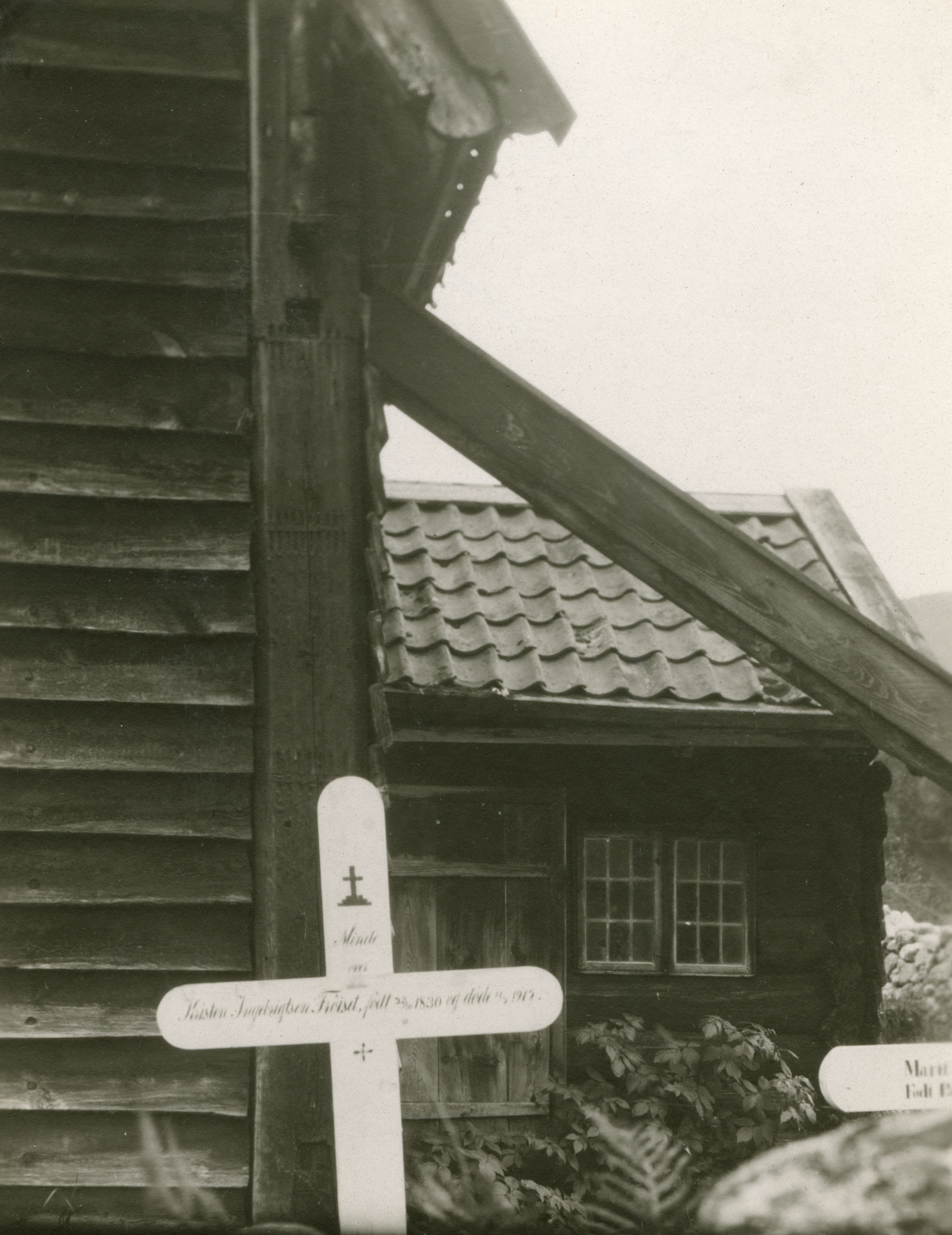

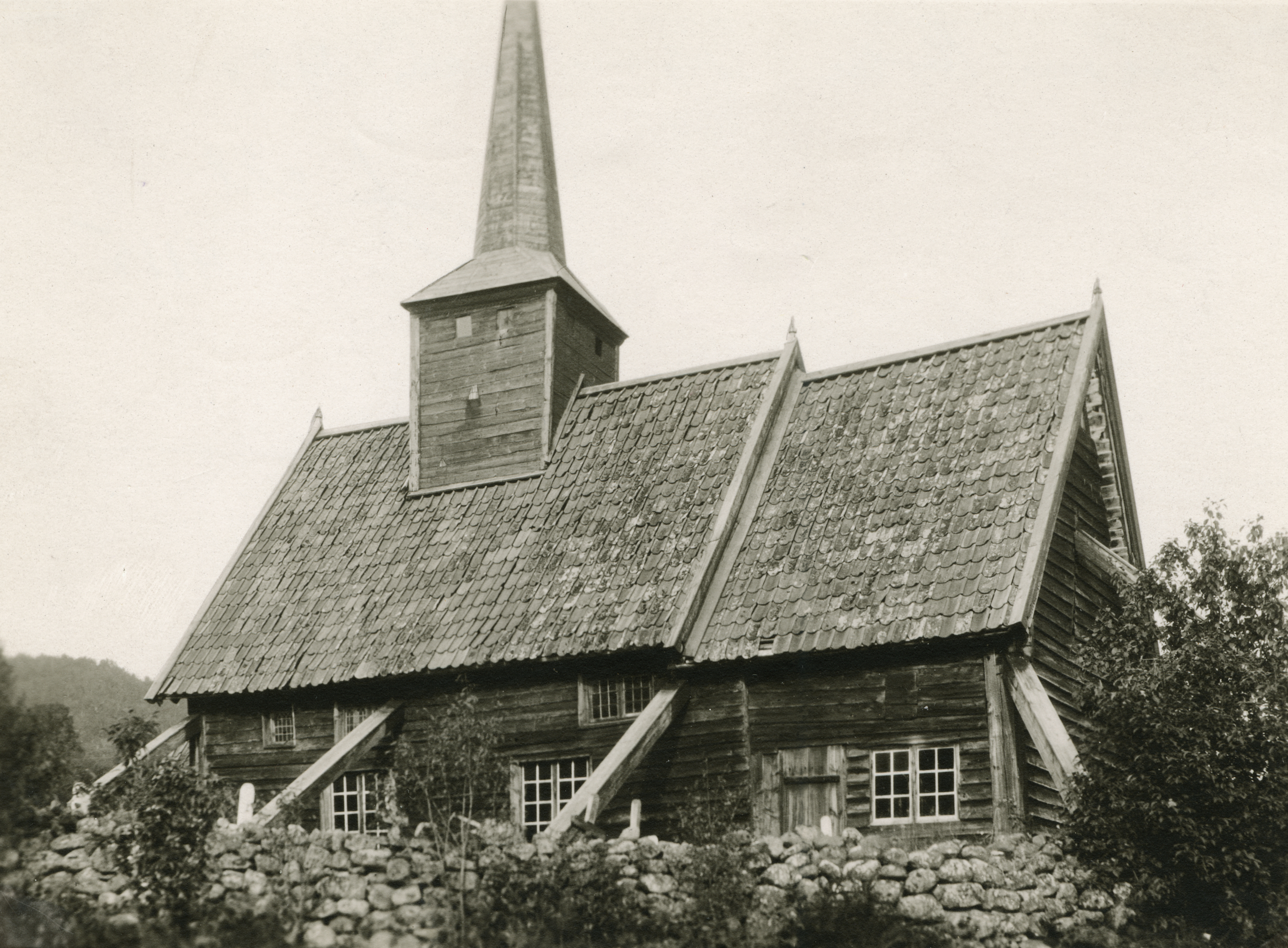

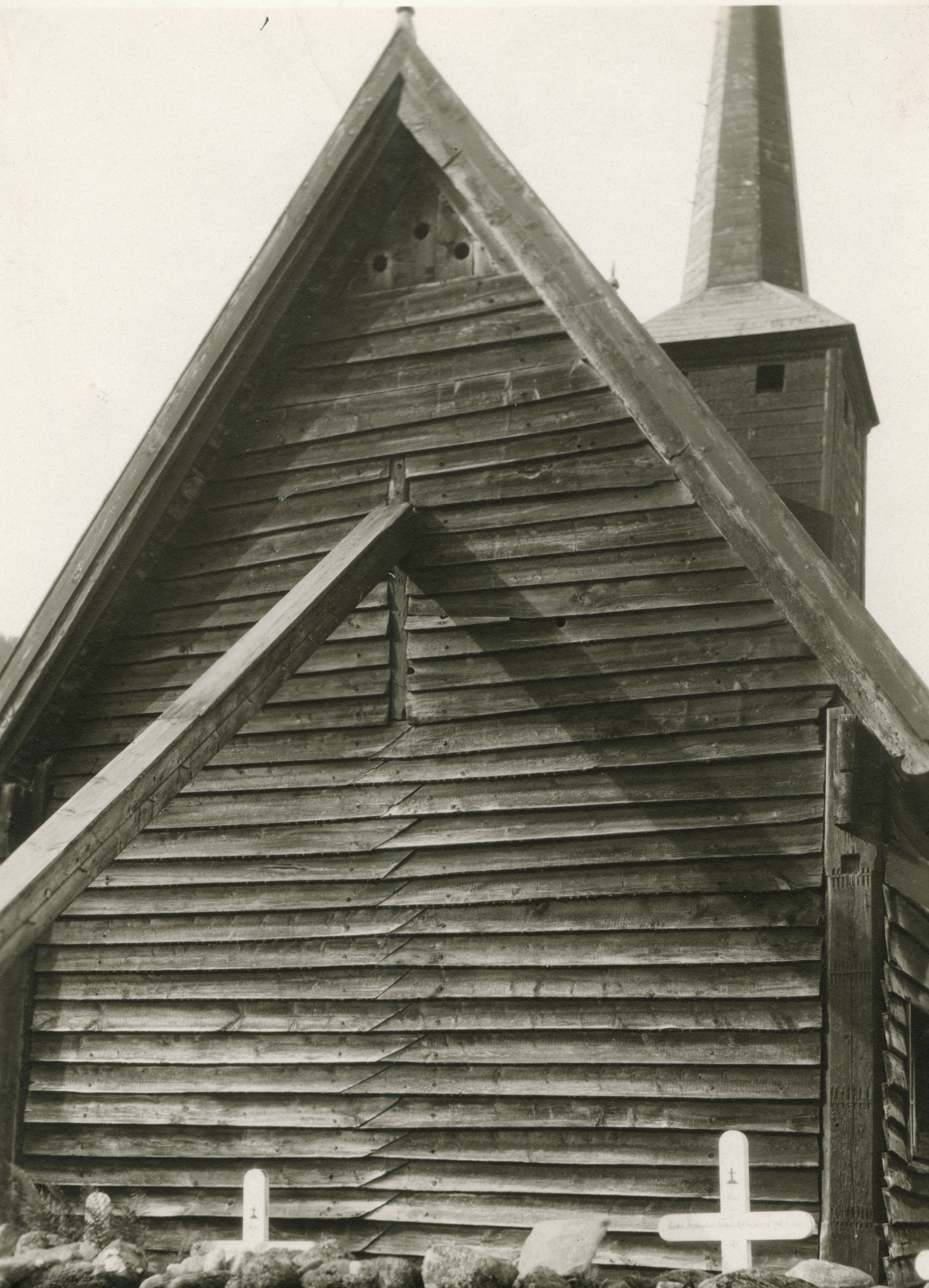

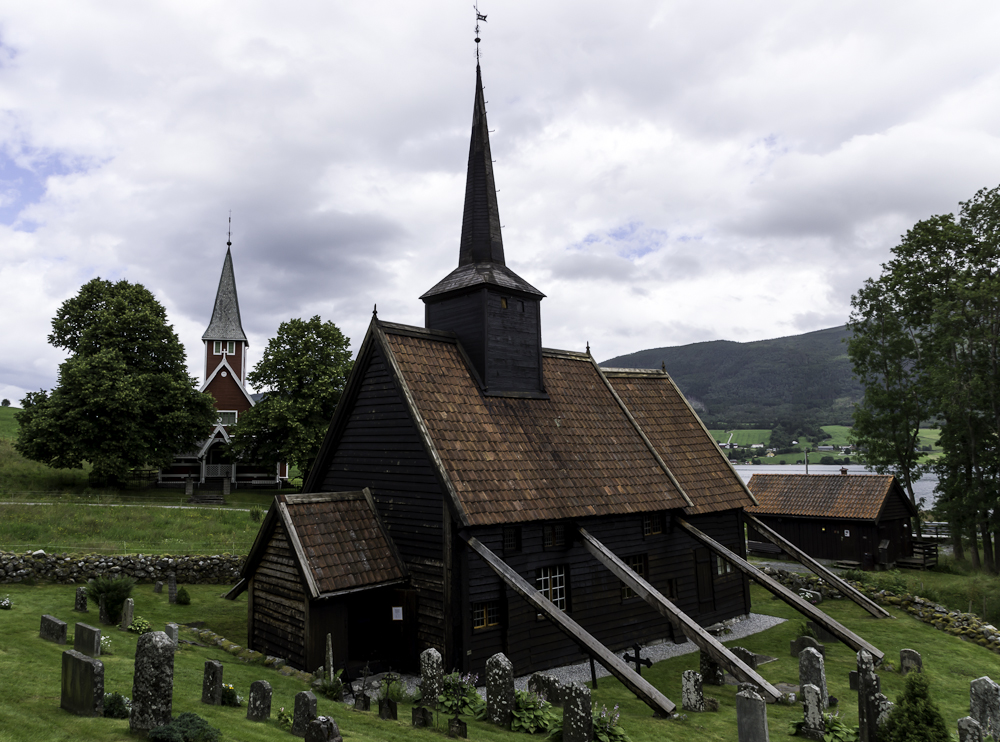

== See also ==
- List of churches in Møre
