= Aadahl =

Aadahl or Ådahl is a surname. Notable people with the surname include:

- Anders Ådahl (born 1972), Swedish politician
- Bo Ådahl (1932–2000), Finnish diplomat
- Erik Aadahl (born 1976), American sound editor
- Martin Ådahl (born 1969), Swedish politician
- Simon and Frank Ådahl, members of the Swedish musical group Edin-Ådahl
- Thorvald Aadahl (1882–1962), Norwegian newspaper editor, writer and playwright
