= Isfjorden (fjord in Møre og Romsdal) =

Fjord in Møre og Romsdal, Norway

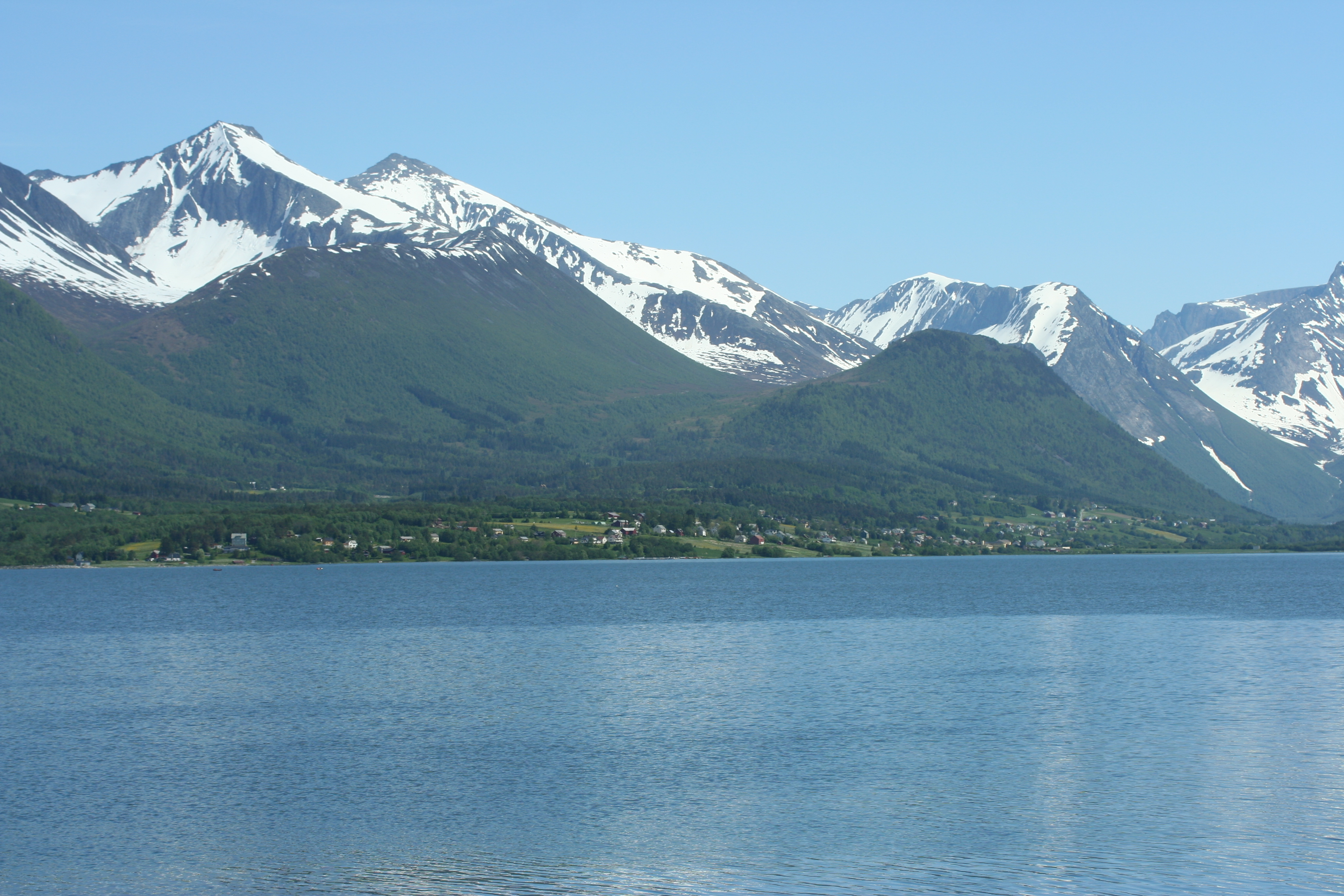
- View of the fjord
- Interactive map of the fjord
- Location: Møre og Romsdal county, Norway
- Coordinates: 62.5768611°N 7.7281777°E
- Type: Fjord
- Primary outflows: Romsdal Fjord
- Basin countries: Norway
- Max. length: 6.5 kilometres (4.0 mi)
- Settlements: Åndalsnes, Isfjorden

Isfjorden is an inner branch of the great Romsdal Fjord in Rauma Municipality in Møre og Romsdal county, Norway. The 6.5-kilometre (4.0 mi) long fjord stretches past the town of Åndalsnes and ends at the village of Isfjorden. Norwegian County Road 64 runs around the whole fjord. The Rauma Line has its terminus at the railway port in the town of Åndalsnes, on the southern coast of the fjord.

== History ==
During the Battle of Kringen in 1612, Scottish forces sailed into the Isfjorden, landed, and then proceeded to march towards the Romsdalen valley.

== See also ==
- List of Norwegian fjords
