= Søren Jørgensen Aandahl =

Norwegian politician

Søren Jørgensen Aandahl (1802–1886) was a Norwegian politician.

He was elected to the Norwegian Parliament in 1842, 1851, 1854 and 1857, representing the rural constituency of Romsdals Amt (today named Møre og Romsdal). He worked as a farmer.
