= Hen Municipality =

Former municipality in Møre og Romsdal, Norway

Hen Municipality Hen herred
- Former municipality
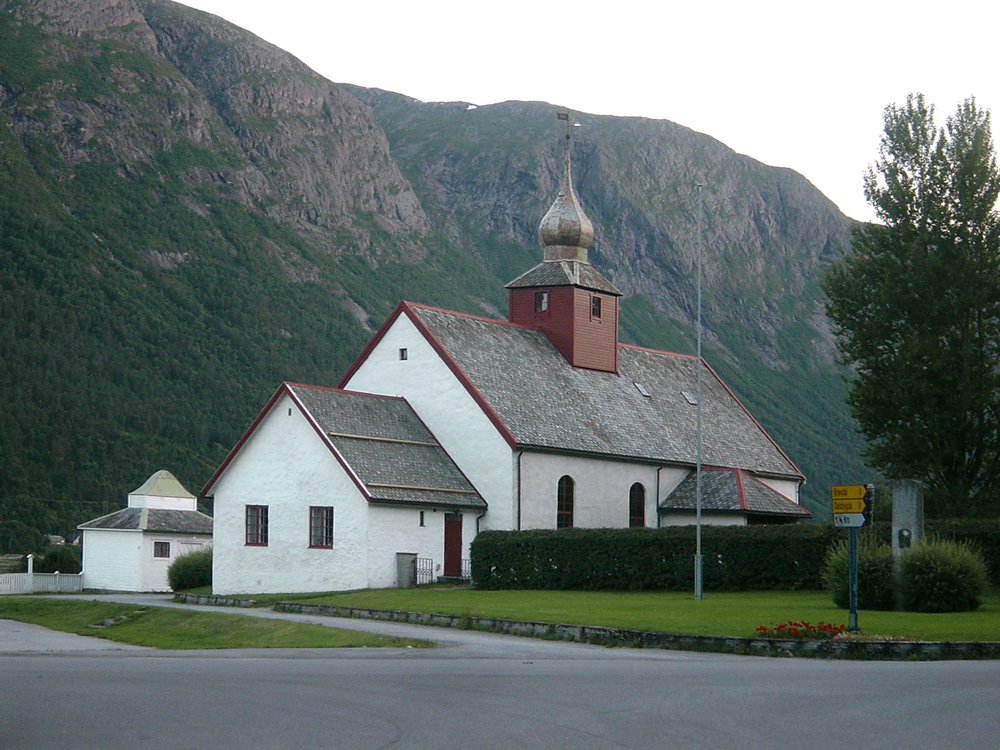

- Møre og Romsdal within Norway

- Hen within Møre og Romsdal
- Coordinates: 62°33′N 07°49′E
- Country: Norway
- County: Møre og Romsdal
- District: Romsdal
- Established: 1 Jan 1902
  - Preceded by: Grytten Municipality
- Disestablished: 1 Jan 1964
  - Succeeded by: Rauma Municipality
- Administrative centre: Isfjorden

Government
  - Mayor (1957-1963): Søren O. Dahle

Area (upon dissolution)
  - Total: 245.5 km^{2} (94.8 sq mi)
  - Rank: #332 in Norway
- Highest elevation: 1,852 m (6,076 ft)

Population (1963)
  - Total: 1,661
  - Rank: #504 in Norway
  - Density: 6.8/km^{2} (18/sq mi)
  - Change (10 years): ▼ −0.7%

Official language
  - Norwegian form: Neutral
- Time zone: UTC+01:00 (CET)
  - Summer (DST): UTC+02:00 (CEST)
- ISO 3166 code: NO-1540

Hen is a former municipality in Møre og Romsdal county, Norway. The 245.5-square-kilometre (94.8 sq mi) municipality existed from 1902 until its dissolution in 1964. The area is now part of Rauma Municipality in the traditional district of Romsdal. The administrative centre was the village of Isfjorden. The area of Hen Municipality is still a parish within the municipality of Rauma. The parish has one church, Hen Church, located in Isfjorden.

Prior to its dissolution in 1964, the 245.5-square-kilometre (94.8 sq mi) municipality was the 332nd largest by area out of the 689 municipalities in Norway. Hen Municipality was the 504th most populous municipality in Norway with a population of about 1,661. The municipality's population density was 6.8 inhabitants per square kilometre (18/sq mi) and its population had decreased by 0.7% over the previous 10-year period.

== General information ==
The municipality of Hen was established on 1 January 1902 when the large Grytten Municipality was divided into two parts: Hen Municipality (population: 1,128) in the east and Grytten Municipality (population: 1,728) in the west.

During the 1960s, there were many municipal mergers across Norway due to the work of the Schei Committee. On 1 January 1964, a large municipal merger took place. The following places were merged to form the new Rauma Municipality on that date:

- all of Hen Municipality (population: 1,663)
- all of Eid Municipality (population: 381)
- all of Grytten Municipality (population: 3,683)
- all of Voll Municipality (population: 1,163)
- the southern part of Veøy Municipality (population: 1,400)

=== Name ===
The municipality (originally the parish) is named after the old Hen farm (Old Norse: Hávin) since the first Hen Church was built there. The meaning of the first element is uncertain. It could be hár which means "high" or alternatively há which means "the grass that grows after the first crop has been mown". The last element is vin which means "meadow" or "pasture".

=== Churches ===
The Church of Norway had one parish (sokn) within Hen Municipality. At the time of the municipal dissolution, it was part of the Grytten prestegjeld and the Indre Romsdal prosti (deanery) in the Diocese of Nidaros.

Churches in Hen Municipality
Parish (sokn)	Church name	Location of the church	Year built
Hen	Hen Church	Isfjorden	1831

== Geography ==
Hen encompassed the valleys extending to the south and east of the Isfjorden in the northeastern part of the present-day Rauma Municipality. The mountains Kyrkjetaket and Gjuratinden are both located in Hen. Veøy Municipality was to the north, Eresfjord og Vistdal Municipality was to the east, and Grytten Municipality was to the south and west. The highest point in the municipality was the 1,852-metre (6,076 ft) tall mountain Store Venjetinden, located on the border with Grytten Municipality.

== Government ==
While it existed, Hen Municipality was responsible for primary education (through 10th grade), outpatient health services, senior citizen services, welfare and other social services, zoning, economic development, and municipal roads and utilities. The municipality was governed by a municipal council of directly elected representatives. The mayor was indirectly elected by a vote of the municipal council. The municipality was under the jurisdiction of the Frostating Court of Appeal.

=== Municipal council ===
The municipal council (Herredsstyre) of Hen Municipality was made up of 13 representatives that were elected to four year terms. The tables below show the historical composition of the council by political party.

Hen herredsstyre 1959–1963
Party name (in Norwegian)	Number of representatives
Labour Party (Arbeiderpartiet)	3
Conservative Party (Høyre)	1
Joint List(s) of Non-Socialist Parties (Borgerlige Felleslister)	7
Local List(s) (Lokale lister)	2
Total number of members:	13

Hen herredsstyre 1955–1959
Party name (in Norwegian)	Number of representatives
Labour Party (Arbeiderpartiet)	4
Joint List(s) of Non-Socialist Parties (Borgerlige Felleslister)	9
Total number of members:	13

Hen herredsstyre 1951–1955
Party name (in Norwegian)	Number of representatives
Labour Party (Arbeiderpartiet)	3
Joint List(s) of Non-Socialist Parties (Borgerlige Felleslister)	9
Total number of members:	12

Hen herredsstyre 1947–1951
Party name (in Norwegian)	Number of representatives
Labour Party (Arbeiderpartiet)	3
Joint List(s) of Non-Socialist Parties (Borgerlige Felleslister)	9
Total number of members:	12

Hen herredsstyre 1945–1947
Party name (in Norwegian)	Number of representatives
Labour Party (Arbeiderpartiet)	3
Local List(s) (Lokale lister)	9
Total number of members:	12

Hen herredsstyre 1937–1941*
Party name (in Norwegian)	Number of representatives
Labour Party (Arbeiderpartiet)	2
Joint List(s) of Non-Socialist Parties (Borgerlige Felleslister)	8
Local List(s) (Lokale lister)	2
Total number of members:	12
Note: Due to the German occupation of Norway during World War II, no elections were held for new municipal councils until after the war ended in 1945.

=== Mayors ===
The mayor (Norwegian: ordfører) of Hen Municipality was the political leader of the municipality and the chairperson of the municipal council. The following people have held this position:

- 1902–1904: Erik Olsen Tokle
- 1905–1908: Erik L. Kavli
- 1908–1910: Elling Thokle
- 1911–1913: Erik L. Kavli
- 1913–1922: K.K. Brevik
- 1922–1926: P.E. Brevik
- 1926–1928: Søren O. Dahle
- 1928–1931: O.O. Tokle
- 1931–1941: Søren O. Dahle
- 1941–1944: Jacob Grøvdal (NS)
- 1945–1945: Gregorius Aasen
- 1945–1951: Søren O. Dahle
- 1951–1957: Lars E. Kavli
- 1957–1963: Søren O. Dahle

== See also ==
- List of former municipalities of Norway
