= Trolltinden =

Trolltinden (singular) or Trolltindane (plural) are the names of several summits or mountain ranges in Norway:

== Innlandet county ==
- Trolltinden (Innlandet) (2,018 m) in Rondane, previously called Sagtinden

== Møre og Romsdal county ==
- Trolltindane, a mountain ridge in Rauma, on the western side of Romsdalen valley, including:
  - Store Trolltind (1,788 m), near Troll Wall in Rauma, part of Trolltindane in Rauma
  - Trollveggen or Troll Wall in Rauma, a vertical rock face, part of Trolltindane
  - Trollryggen a summit and pillar in Trolltindane range
- Trolltindane (890 m), mountains along the border of the municipalities Eide and Fræna
- Trolltinden (Møre og Romsdal) (1,170 m), also called Brustinden, in Vestnes

== Nordland county ==
- Trolltinden (Nordland) (426 m), in Andøy
