= Carl Boenish =

American BASE jumper (1941–1984)

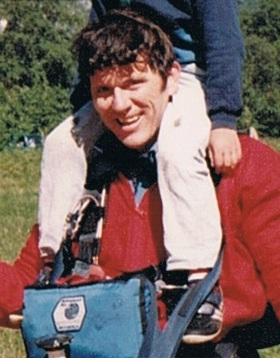
- Carl Boenish after successful jump from the Troll Wall in 1984 the day before his death.
- Born: Carl Ronald Boenish; April 3, 1941; New Castle, Pennsylvania, United States
- Died: July 7, 1984 (aged 43); Trolltindane range in Rauma, Møre og Romsdal, Norway
- Occupation: Cinematographer
- Spouse: Jean Boenish (m. 1979)

Carl Ronald Boenish (/ˈbeɪnɪʃ/ BAY-nish; April 3, 1941 – July 7, 1984), considered the father of modern BASE jumping, was an American freefall cinematographer, who in 1978 filmed the first jumps from El Capitan using ram-air parachutes.

== Biography ==
Boenish repeated his jumps, not as a publicity exercise or as a movie stunt, but as part of the development and popularization of BASE jumping as recreational activity, distinct from other disciplines of parachuting. This approach defined the modern sport of BASE jumping. Boenish helped popularize this sport by filming and presenting the footage. Boenish also published BASE Magazine to promote safety in this new sport.

Boenish's cinematography work included the 1969 John Frankenheimer parachuting film classic The Gypsy Moths, starring Burt Lancaster and Gene Hackman, and a National Geographic Explorer segment on jumps from El Capitan.

His life and death is the subject of the 2015 documentary film by Marah Strauch, Sunshine Superman. Boenish was a Christian Scientist and had an improperly-set broken leg that hampered his walk.

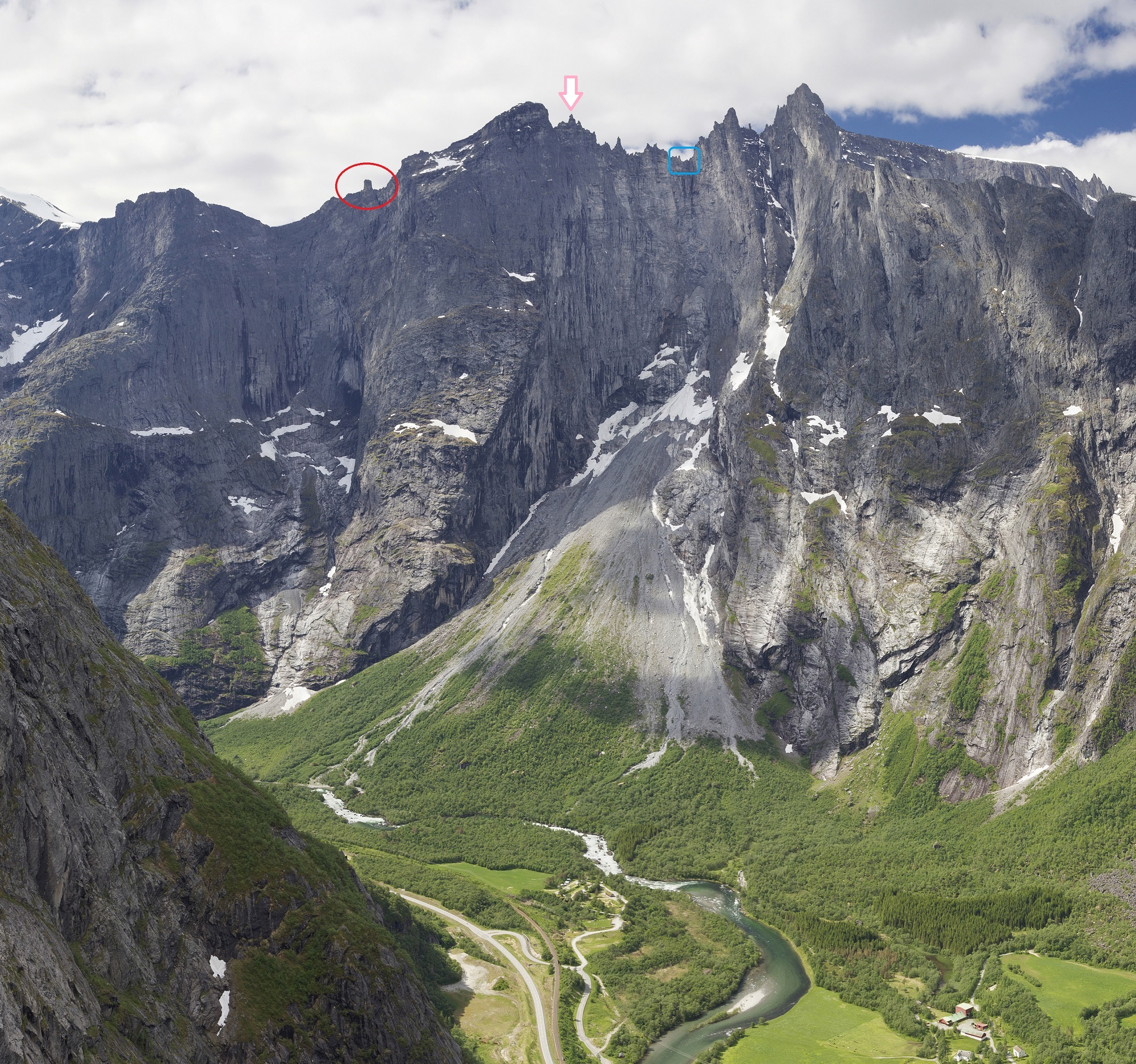
Trolltindene ridge: Stabben inside red circle, Trollspiret under arrow, Bruraskaret in blue rectangle above the cone shaped scree.

Boenish died in a BASE jump off the Stabben pinnacle in Trolltindane range (not Troll Wall proper) in Rauma Municipality, Møre og Romsdal, Norway, the day after completing a successful double BASE jump with his wife, Jean Boenish, for a Guinness World Records television special hosted by David Frost and young Kathie Lee Johnson, now Kathie Lee Gifford. Jean Boenish did another jump two days after the fatal jump.
