= Fly (2024 film) =

- Theatrical release poster
- Directed by: Christina Clusiau; Shaul Schwarz
- Produced by: Shaul Schwarz
- Cinematography: Christina Clusiau; Shaul Schwarz
- Edited by: Andrey Alistratov; James Morrison; Jay Arthur Sterrenberg
- Music by: Alex Weston
- Production companies: Candescent Films; Chicago Media Project; Impact Partners; Reel Peak Films; Shark Island Productions
- Distributed by: National Geographic Documentary Films
- Release dates: March 10, 2024 (South by Southwest); September 2, 2024 (United States)
- Running time: 110 minutes
- Countries: United States; Australia
- Language: English

Fly is a 2024 documentary film, directed by Christina Clusiau and Shaul Schwarz. The film's plot explores three romantic couples entwined in the world's most dangerous sport: BASE jumping.

The film premiered at the South by Southwest Film Festival on March 10, 2024, and was released in the United States on September 2, 2024, by National Geographic Documentary Films.

== Premise ==
To stand on the edge of a cliff and throw your body into the wind, one has to be willing to lose everything. That could mean the love of your life, or it could be the life you love. FLY is an intimate portrait of three romantic couples entwined in the world's most dangerous sport. Can they protect their partners while also setting them free?

— South by Southwest

== Plot ==
The film follows three BASE jumping couples.

Marta Empinotti and Jimmy Pouchert are BASE jumping veterans of 25 years, and they run a school for aspiring BASE jumpers. The couple are looked up to as parental figures in the BASE community.

Marta recalls the early days of BASE, when jumpers only had skydiving equipment and experimented to make the activity less dangerous. She lost a boyfriend, Steven Gyrsting, in 1987 to a BASE jumping accident, and it took her six months to return to the sport. She worries that Jimmy can be reckless.

Espen Fadnes and Amber Forte are Norwegian BASE jumpers. Espen is more willing to take risks, while Amber says she dislikes the danger but loves the feeling of flight.

Robert "Scotty" Morgan, a former Marine and Iraq veteran, is known for flying in close proximity to the ground, which is a highly dangerous way to wingsuit BASE jump. He recalls losing his best friend, Mat Kenney, in a wingsuiting accident. Scotty's girlfriend, Julia Botelho, is a former lawyer who was unhappy in her profession. She left to pursue rock climbing and BASE jumping full-time.

The athletes reflect on what drives them to pursue such a dangerous sport. They experience milestones and encounter life-altering events.

Espen's father, Iver Otto Gjelstenli, a rock climber, dies while climbing up to Store Venjetinden. Having never lost anyone so close to him, Espen can now empathize with the families of BASE jumpers who have died.

During a competition, Amber is seriously injured when her landing goes wrong. She shatters her right femur and suffers a spinal injury, both requiring surgery and extensive rehabilitation. She worries that her relationship with Espen may not survive if they can no longer BASE jump together. She eventually recovers and returns to the sport.

Jimmy dies while BASE jumping with a friend. Marta memorializes him at an annual BASE jumping gathering in Las Vegas. She reflects upon how it is one thing to think about dying while BASE jumping, but the reality is much harder when a death actually occurs.

Scotty marries Julia and they have a baby. The new parents continue BASE jumping, but alternate so that one of them is always on the ground with their son.

== Release ==
The film first premiered at the South by Southwest Film Festival on March 10, 2024, and later at the Hot Docs International Film Festival on April 28, 2024, and the Telluride Film Festival on August 30, 2024. The film was released on IMAX for two days only, on September 2, 2024. It was later broadcast on National Geographic on September 24, which was followed by streaming on Hulu the next day.

== Reception ==
On the review aggregator website Rotten Tomatoes, 92% of 13 critics' reviews are positive, with an average rating of 7.1/10. Carla Hay of Culture Mix reviewed the film, stating "With breathtaking cinematography and even more poignant human stories, Fly is an unforgettable documentary about the dangerous sport of BASE jumping. The documentary shows in unflinching ways how the sport can be as fulfilling as it is addicting". Pat Mullen of POV Magazine wrote: "Fly takes audiences to great heights". Writing for Common Sense Media, Jennifer Green stated "With impressive access to its handful of extreme-sport enthusiasts, Fly offers an insider's view of a small community of high-risk base and wingsuit jumpers from around the world". Nell Minow of RogerEbert.com wrote: "Fly goes a little further in acknowledging the risks and responsibility or lack thereof involved than the recent “Skywalkers: A Love Story,” but perhaps not far enough."
