= Gjuratinden =

Mountain in Møre og Romsdal, Norway

- Juratind
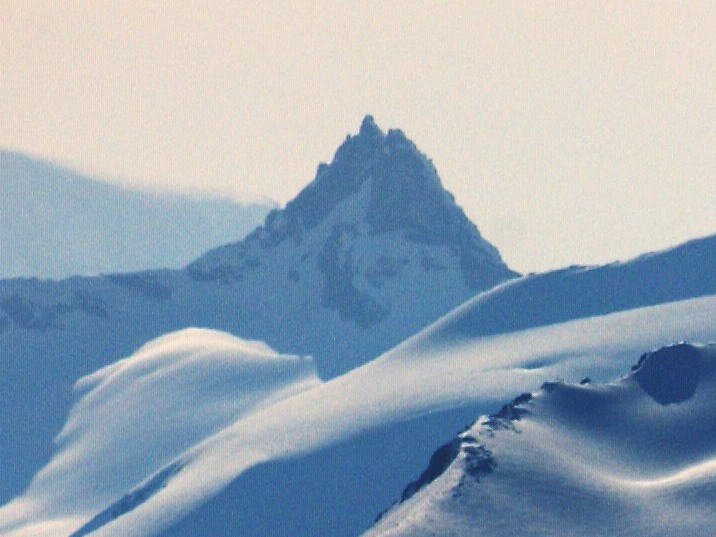
- Juratinden seen from Dronningkrona (north east)

Highest point
- Elevation: 1,712 m (5,617 ft)
- Prominence: 285 m (935 ft)
- Isolation: 3.8 km (2.4 mi) to Sjøvdøla
- Coordinates: 62°34′03″N 8°02′49″E

Geography
- Interactive map of the mountain
- Location: Møre og Romsdal, Norway
- Parent range: Romsdalsalpene
- Topo map: 1320 II Eresfjord

Climbing
- First ascent: 1880 – Iver Kavli and Bård Moen northeast-ridge
- Easiest route: Climbing

Gjuratinden is a mountain on the border of Molde Municipality and Rauma Municipality in Møre og Romsdal county, Norway. It is located about 15 kilometres (9.3 mi) east of the village of Isfjorden and about 20 kilometres (12 mi) east of the town of Åndalsnes. The lake Eikesdalsvatnet lies about 5 kilometres (3.1 mi) to the east of the mountain. The mountain Kyrkjetaket lies about 9 kilometres (5.6 mi) to the northwest.

The mountain is 1,712 metres (5,617 ft) tall. The summit climb is close to scrambling, but a rope is recommended for the final 20 to 30 metres (66 to 98 ft).

== See also ==
- List of mountains of Norway
