= Ole Daniel Enersen =

Norwegian mountain climber (1943–2024)

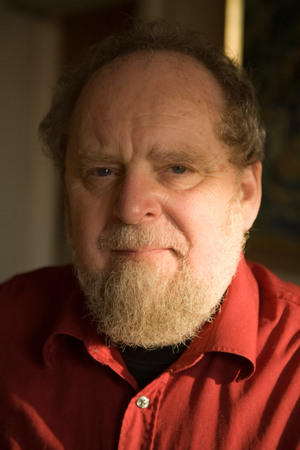
Enersen in 2007

Ole Daniel Enersen (14 March 1943 – 1 January 2024) was a Norwegian climber, photographer, journalist, writer and medical historian.

== Biography ==
In 1965, Enersen made the first ascent of the Trollveggen mountain in Romsdalen, Norway, along with Leif Normann Petterson, Odd Eliassen and Jon Teigland.

He was one of the founders of the Association of Norwegian nature photographers (Norske naturfotografer) in 1976, and the first leader of the organisation.

In 2000, he published a novel in the fantasy genre, titled Dragen som elsket meg ("The dragon that loved me").

Enersen published and maintained Who Named It?, a large online dictionary of medical eponyms.

Enersen died in Oslo on 1 January 2024, at the age of 80.

== See also ==
- Who Named It?
