= Isfjorden (village) =

Village in Rauma Municipality, Norway

- Village
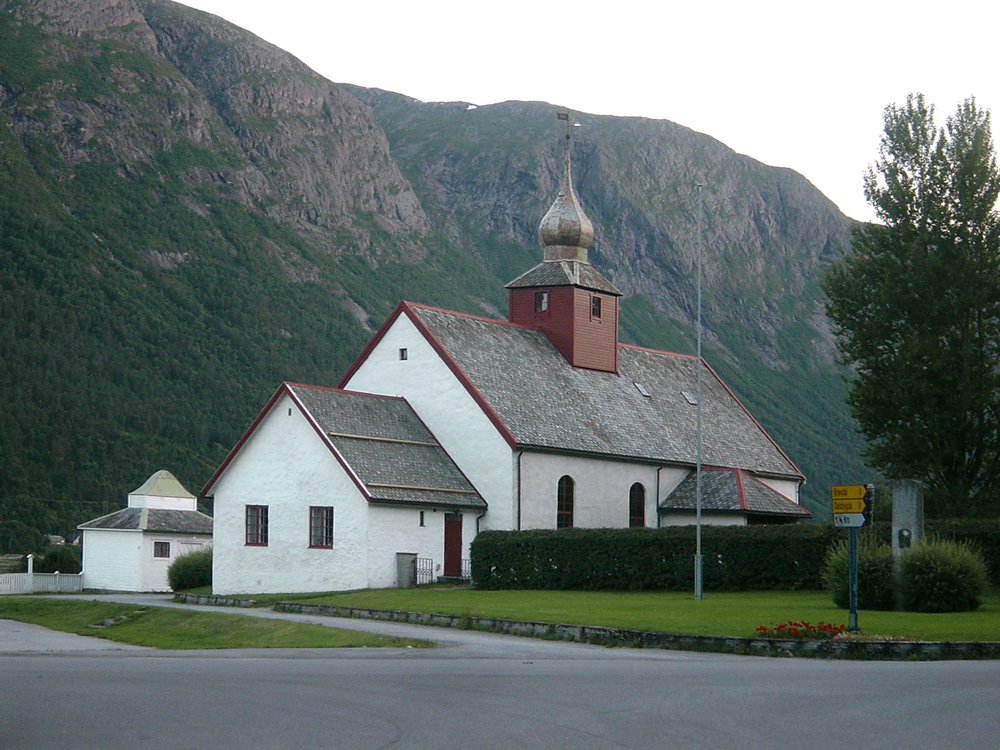
- View of Hen Church in Isfjorden
- Interactive map of Isfjorden
- Location within Møre og Romsdal Location within Norway
- Coordinates: 62.5778°N 7.7923°E
- Country: Norway
- Region: Western Norway
- County: Møre og Romsdal
- District: Romsdal
- Municipality: Rauma Municipality

Area
  - Total: 1.14 km^{2} (0.44 sq mi)
- Elevation: 16 m (52 ft)

Population (2024)
  - Total: 1,546
  - Density: 1,356/km^{2} (3,510/sq mi)
- Time zone: UTC+01:00 (CET)
  - Summer (DST): UTC+02:00 (CEST)
- Post Code: 6320 Isfjorden

Isfjorden is a village in Rauma Municipality in Møre og Romsdal county, Norway. It is located about 6 kilometres (3.7 mi) east of the town of Åndalsnes. The mountains Kyrkjetaket and Gjuratinden lie a few kilometers away. The historic Hen Church is located in the village.

The 1.14-square-kilometre (280-acre) village has a population (2024) of 1,356 and a population density of 1,356 inhabitants per square kilometre (3,510/sq mi).

== History ==
Isfjorden played an important role in the Battle of Kringen, when Scottish ships, needing a landing spot after sea routes had been blocked by Danish forces, landed there on 20 August 1612.

The village was the administrative centre of the old Hen Municipality, which existed from 1902 until 1964 when it became part of the newly-created Rauma Municipality.

== Clothing industry ==
Historically there was a lot of trade between Isfjorden and the northern county of Nordland. Shoes and clothing were produced in practically every home, and eventually several factories were established. This earned Isfjorden the label "the cradle of the Norwegian clothing industry". One of the factories, "Oddfred Tokles konfeksjonsfabrikk", has been turned into a museum.

== Media gallery ==
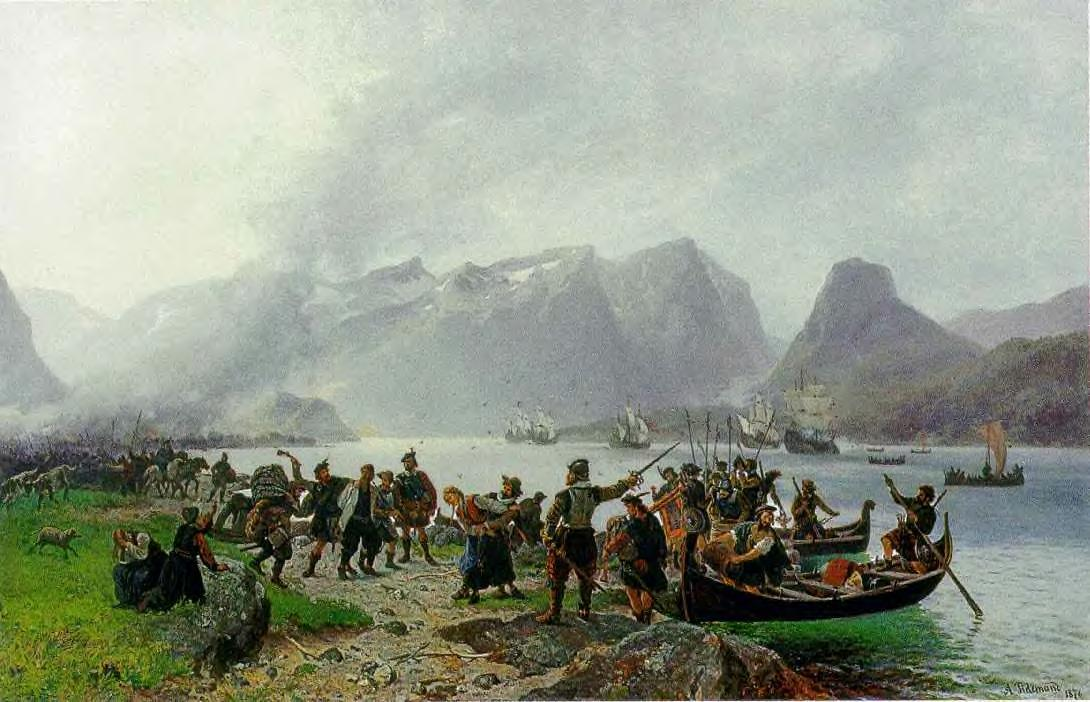
Painting by Adolph Tidemand in the style of Norwegian romantic nationalism of the Scottish landing at Isfjorden - the number of ships is inaccurate

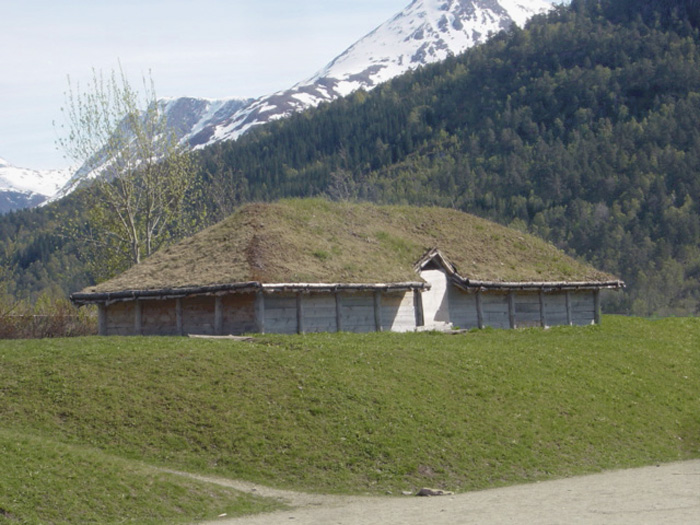
The Viking House by the school.

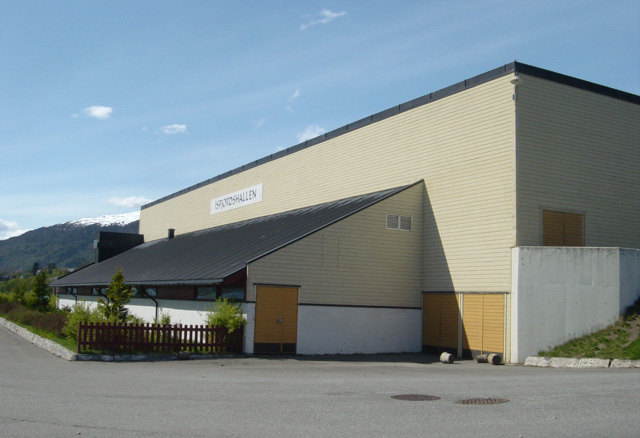
The Isfjord Hall.

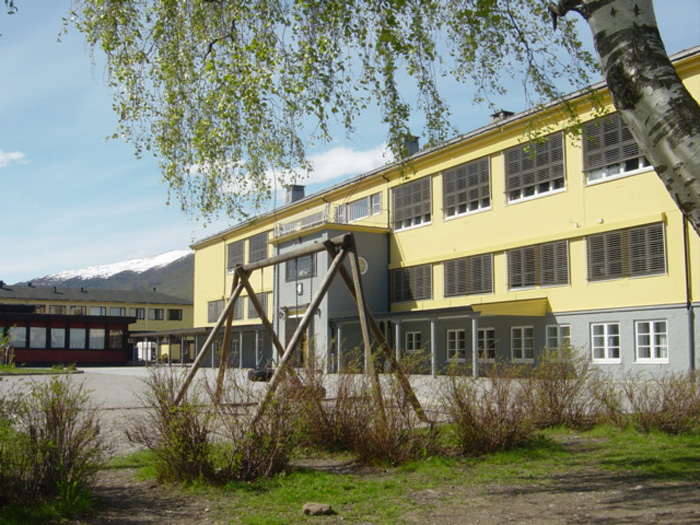
Isfjorden school.

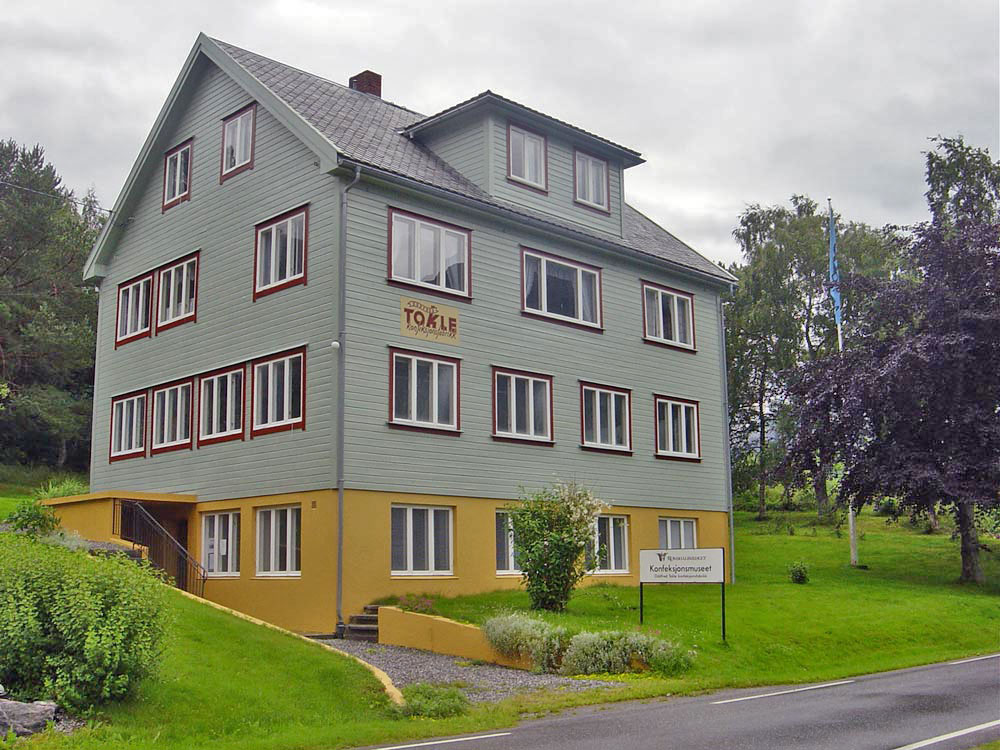
The Clothing Industry Museum.

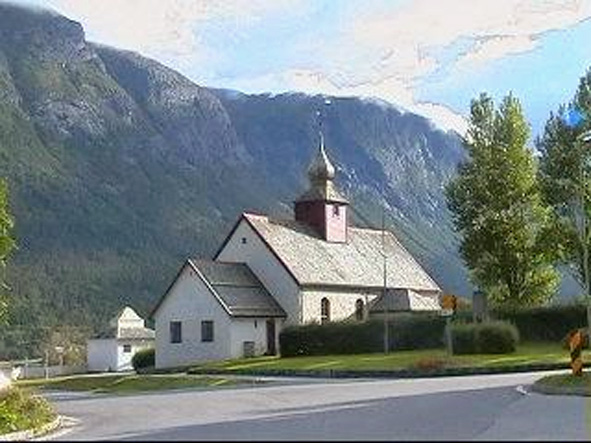
Hen Church, Isfjorden.

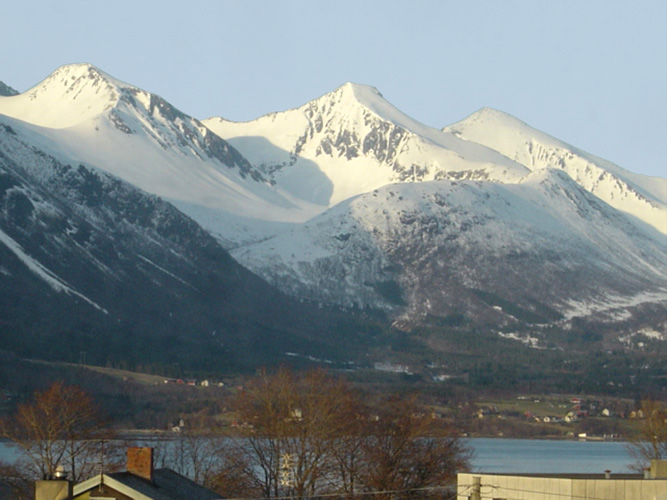
Skarven, Kirketaket and Kjøvskartind, as seen from Åndalsnes.

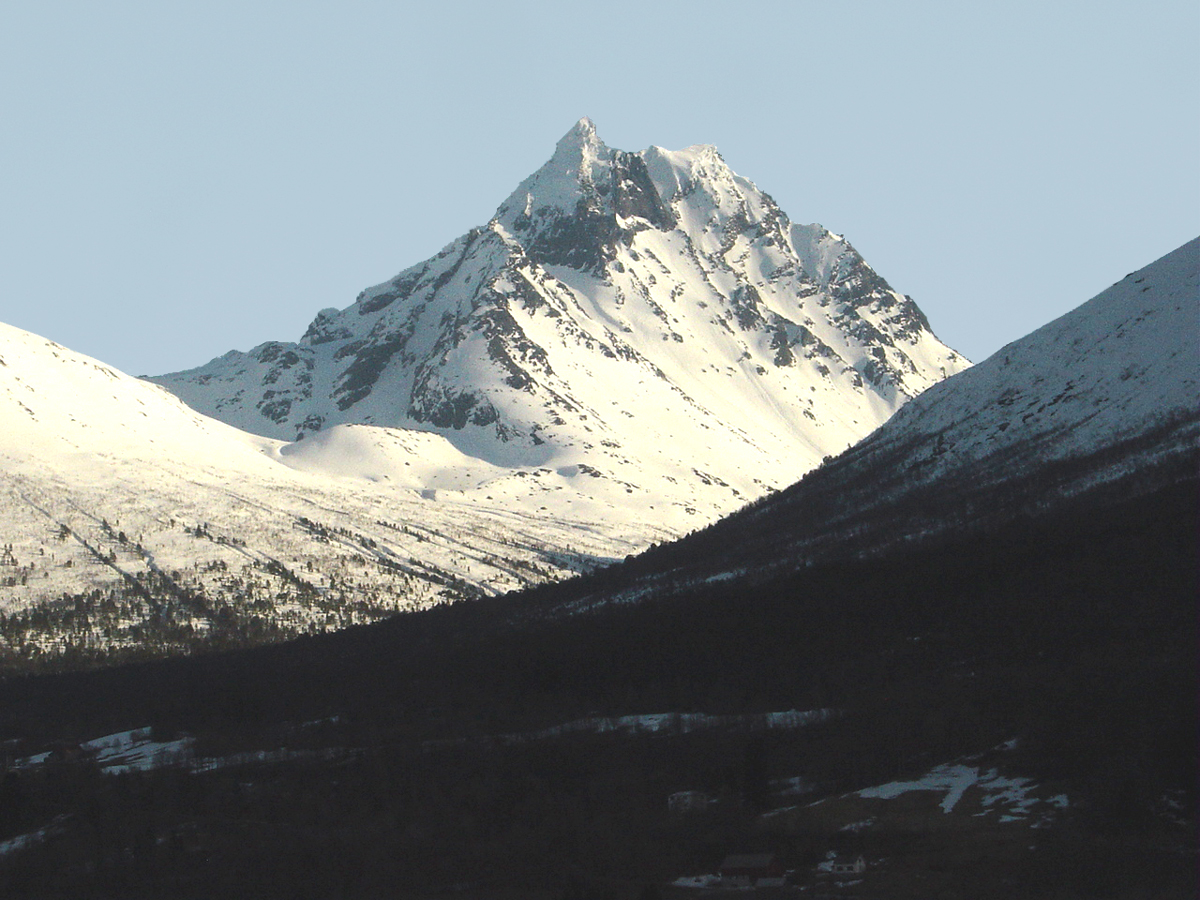
Store Venjetind and the entrance of Vengedalen.

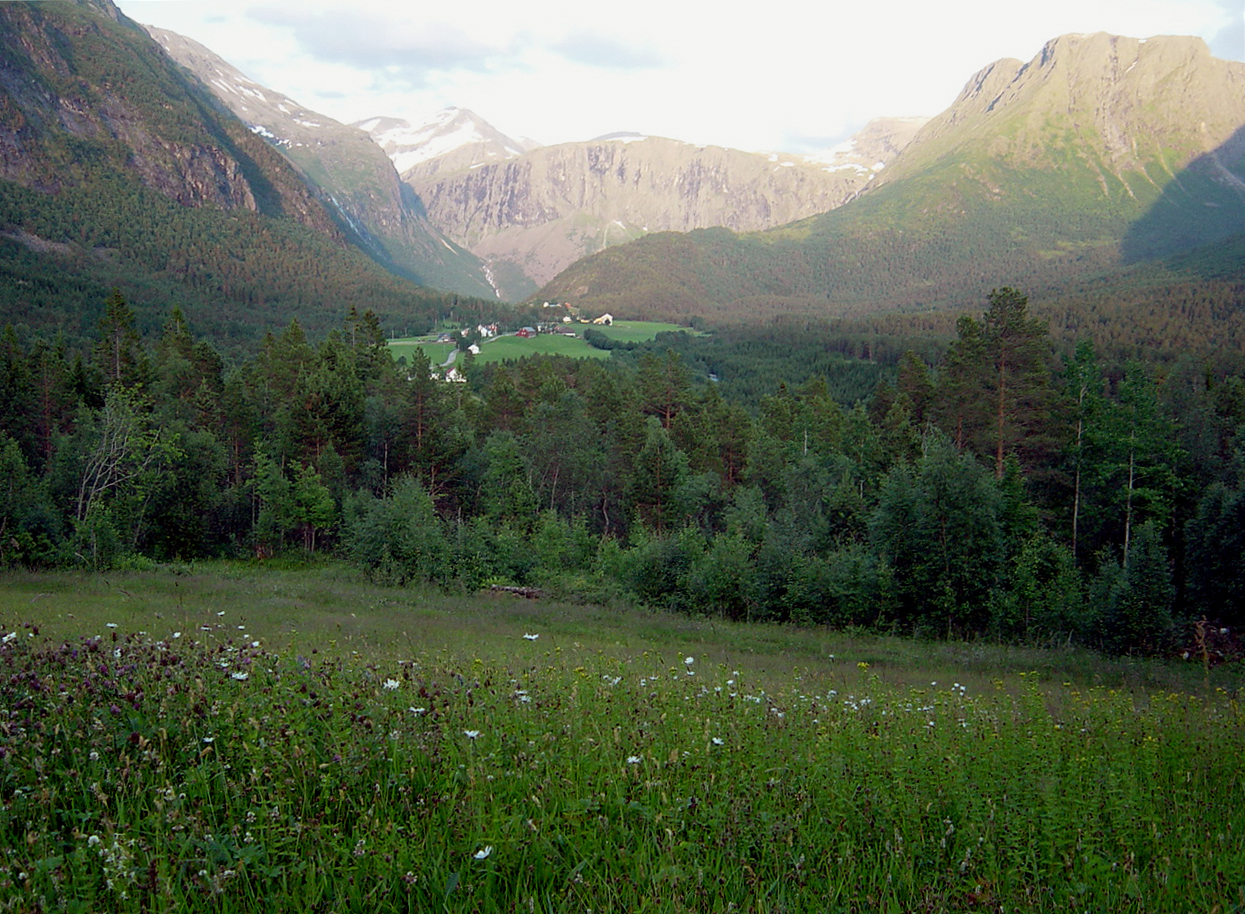
Dalsbygda as seen from Aasen.
