= Hen Church =

Church in Møre og Romsdal, Norway

- Hen kyrkje
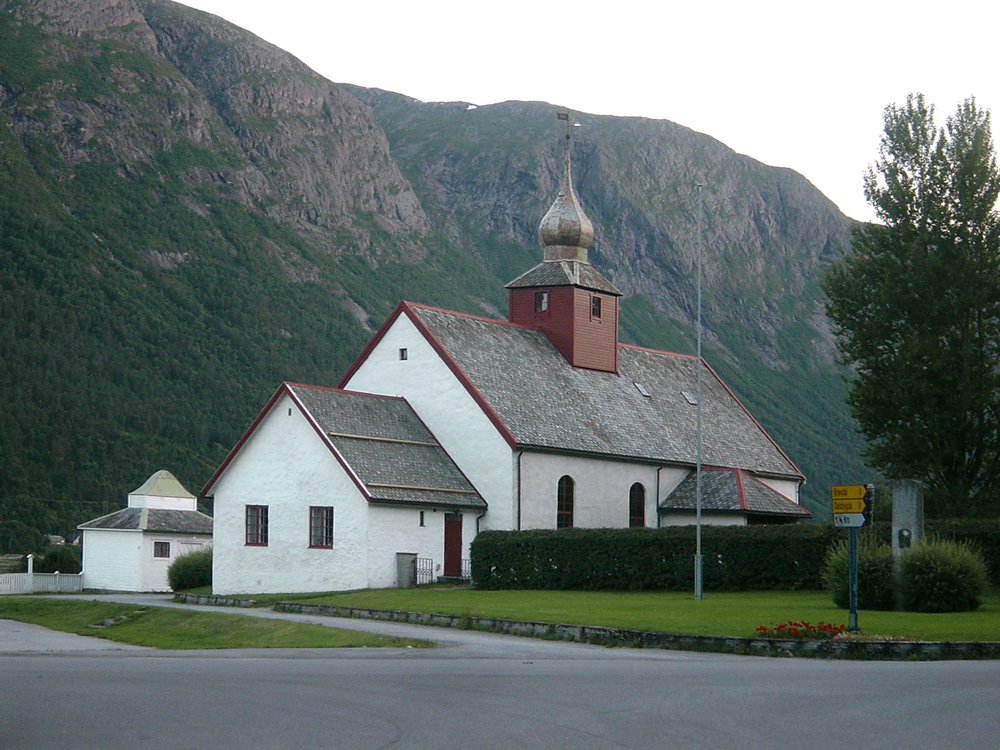
- View of the church
- Hen Church
- 62°34′39″N 7°47′29″E
- Location: Rauma Municipality, Møre og Romsdal
- Country: Norway
- Denomination: Church of Norway
- Churchmanship: Evangelical Lutheran

History
- Status: Parish church
- Founded: 13th century
- Consecrated: 21 October 1835

Architecture
- Functional status: Active
- Architectural type: Long church
- Completed: 1831 (195 years ago)

Specifications
- Capacity: 200
- Materials: Stone

Administration
- Diocese: Møre bispedømme
- Deanery: Indre Romsdal prosti
- Parish: Hen
- Norwegian Cultural Heritage Site
- Type: Church
- Status: Automatically protected

Hen Church (Norwegian: Hen kyrkje) is a parish church of the Church of Norway in Rauma Municipality in Møre og Romsdal county, Norway. It is located in the village of Isfjorden, about 6 kilometres (3.7 mi) east of the town of Åndalsnes. It is the church for the Hen parish which is part of the Indre Romsdal prosti (deanery) in the Diocese of Møre. The white, stone church was built in a long church design in 1831 using plans drawn up by an unknown architect. The church seats about 200 people.

== History ==
There has been a church in this village for centuries. There are some artifacts from the church dating back to the 13th century that are now at the Romsdal Museum and the oldest existing written records of the church date back to 1589. The first church building on the site was a wooden stave church that was located about 30 metres (98 ft) north of the present church site. That building measured about 11.6 by 8.1 metres (38 by 27 ft) and was said to be quite similar to the Rødven Stave Church. Over the years, a number of repairs were carried out on the church, most of them due to rot damage. In 1739, a timber-framed sacristy was added on the north side of the choir.

Starting in 1830, work on a new rectangular stone church constructed out of granite was carried out. The new church was built about 30 metres (98 ft) south of the old church, just outside the churchyard which surrounded the old church. This new, white stone church has an onion dome on top of a central tower on the roof. Much of the construction was completed by 1831, but the new building was not formally consecrated until 21 October 1835. After the new building was completed, the old wooden church was torn down. The building is a neo-Romanesque stone long church that has been covered in white plaster on the exterior. The altarpiece was newly built for the new church in 1831. In 1902, the church was expanded with the addition of a new church porch and sacristy. In 1931, the church interior was restored, including a new pulpit. In 1959–1960, the sacristy was expanded and the church porch was rebuilt.

== Media gallery ==
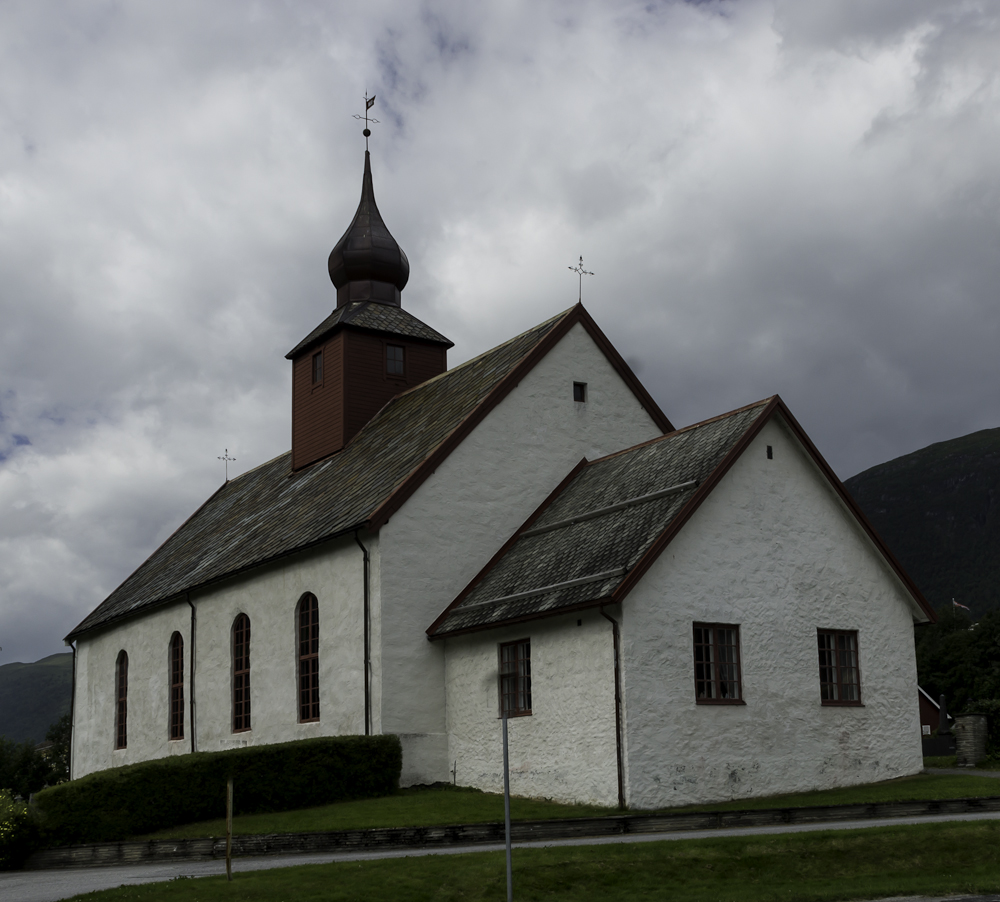
Exterior view

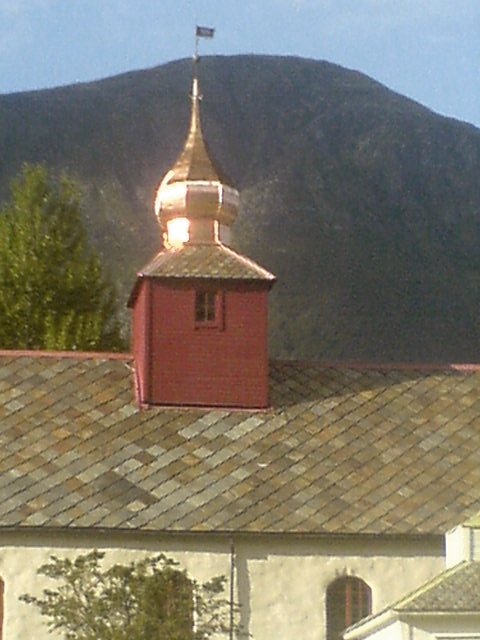
Onion dome

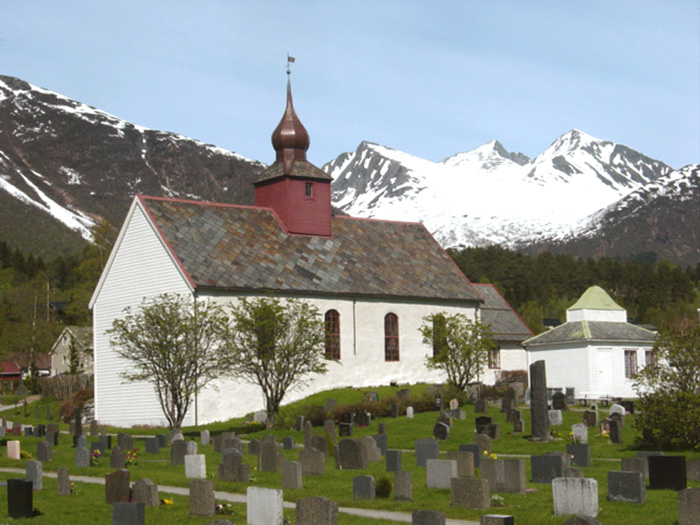
Side view

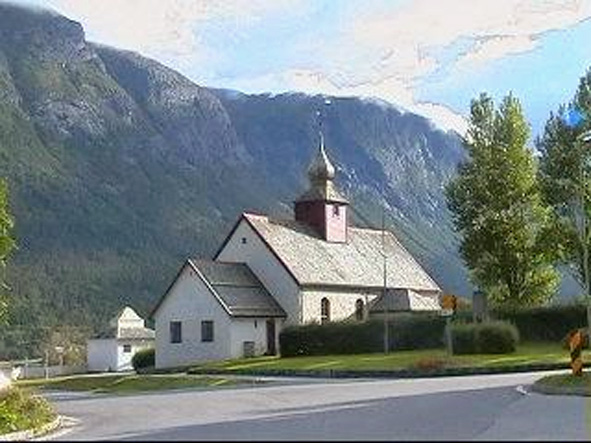

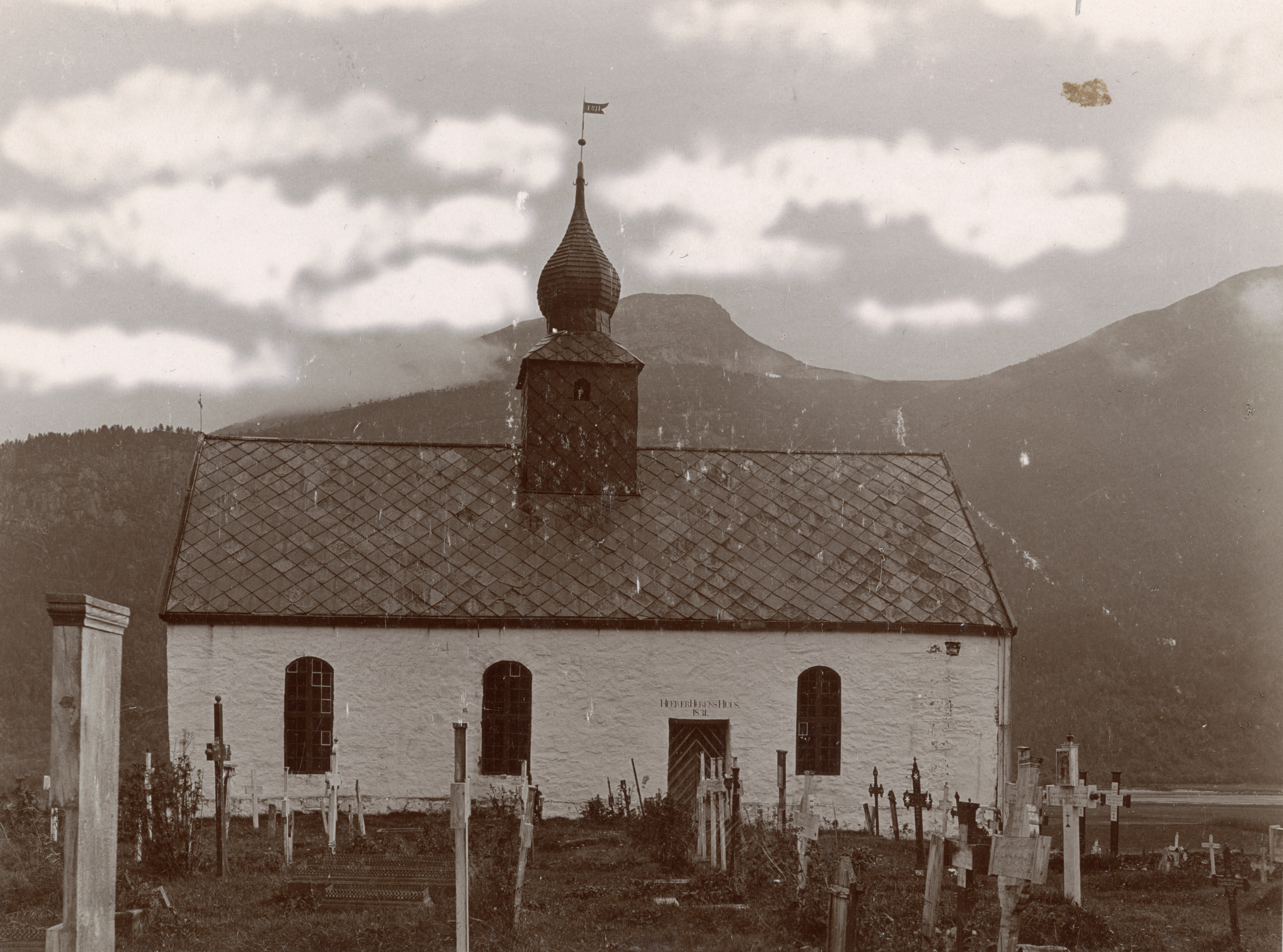

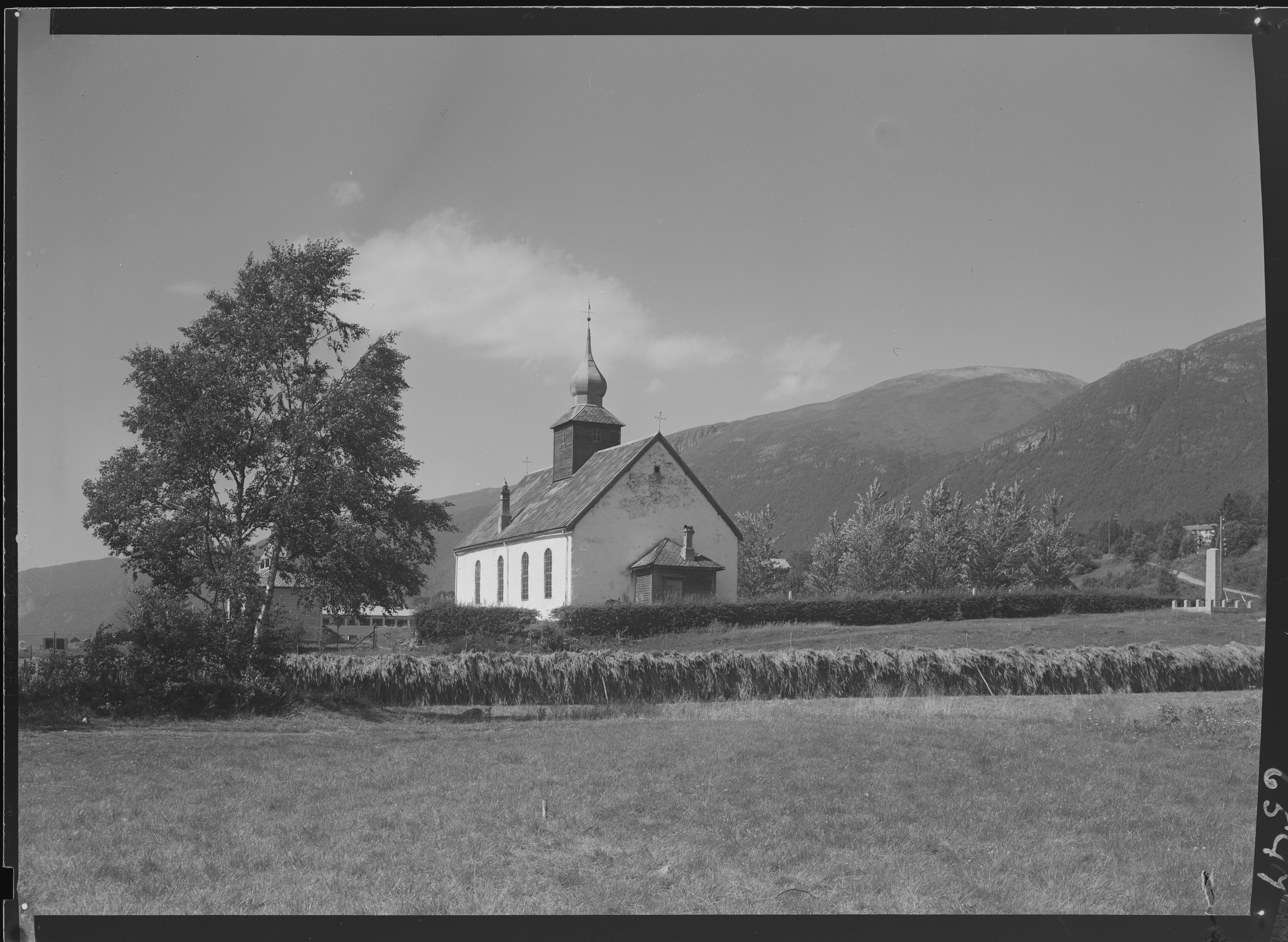

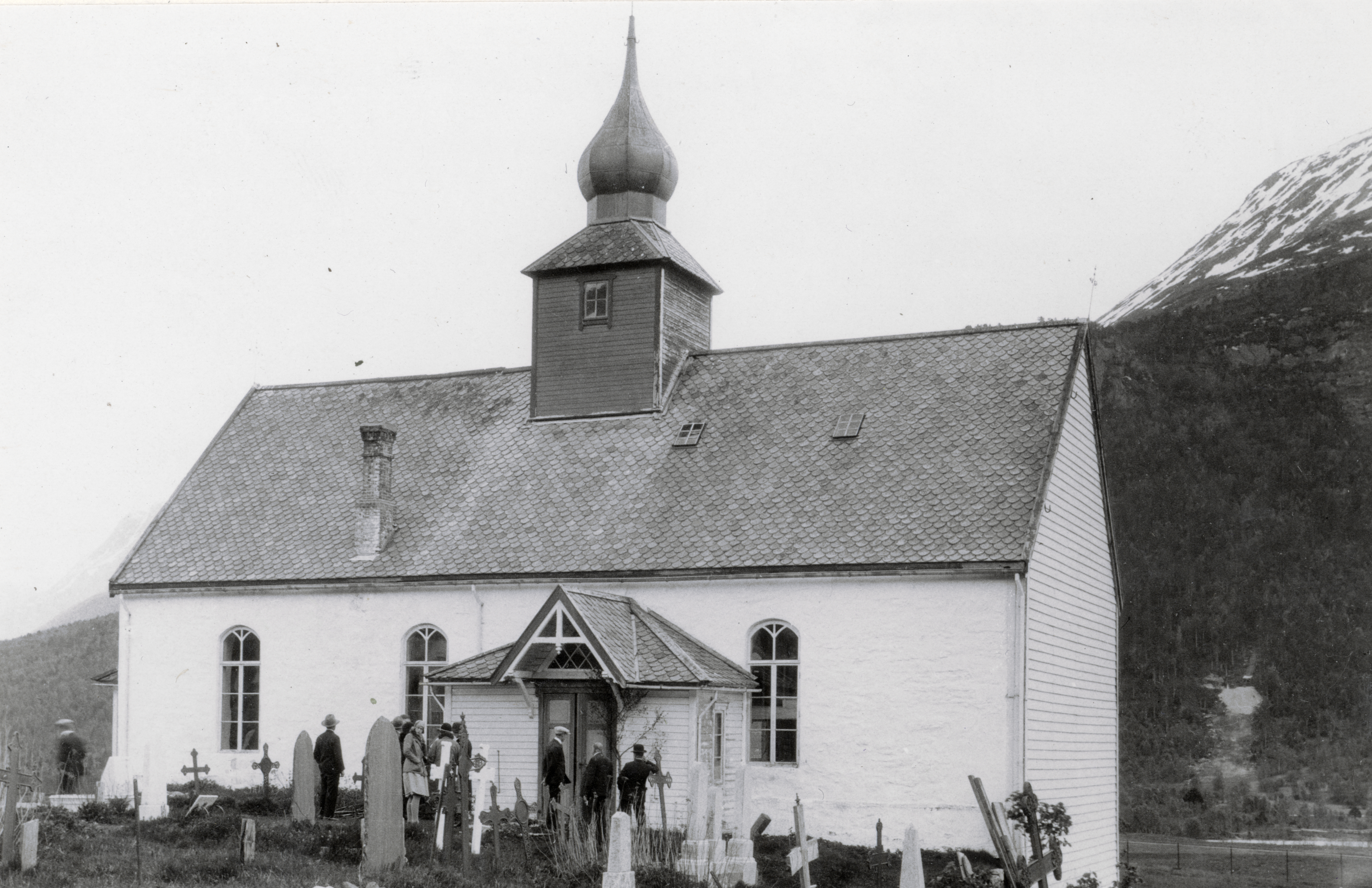

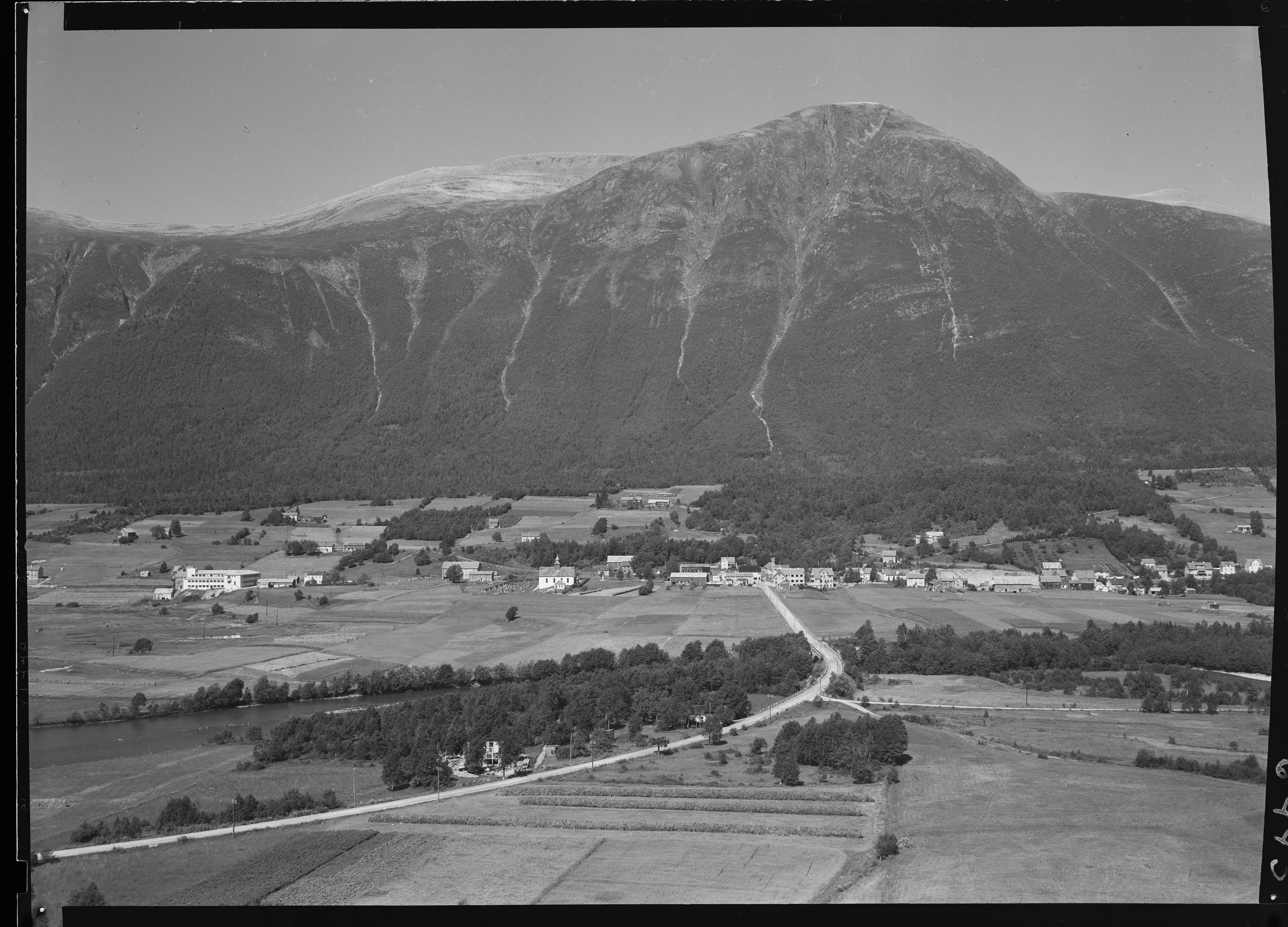

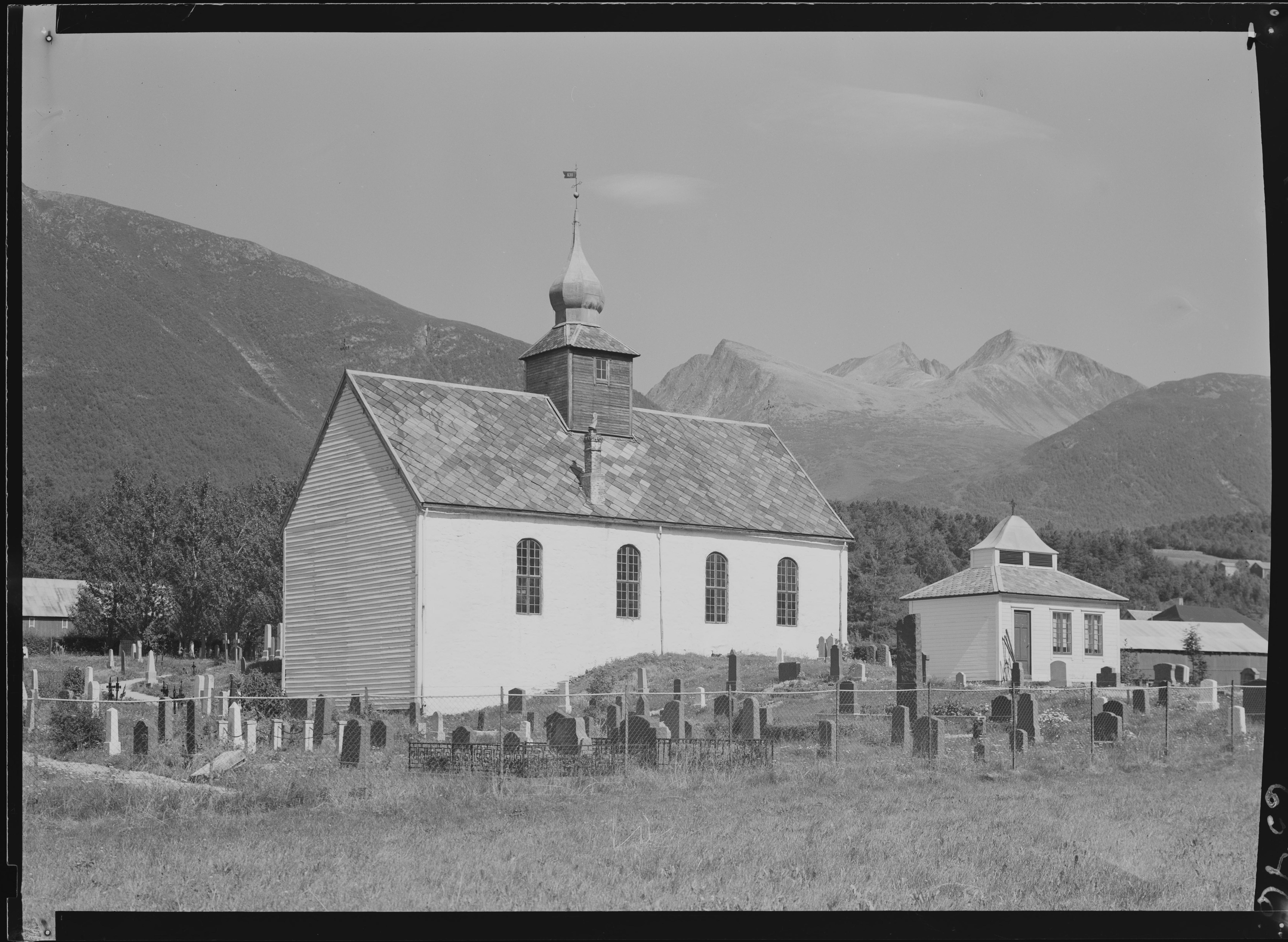

== See also ==
- List of churches in Møre
