= Hans Christian Doseth =

Norwegian climber

- Born: 10 December 1958; Romsdal, Norway
- Died: 6 August 1984 (aged 25); Great Trango Tower, Pakistan
- Occupation: Climber
- Known for: mountaineering

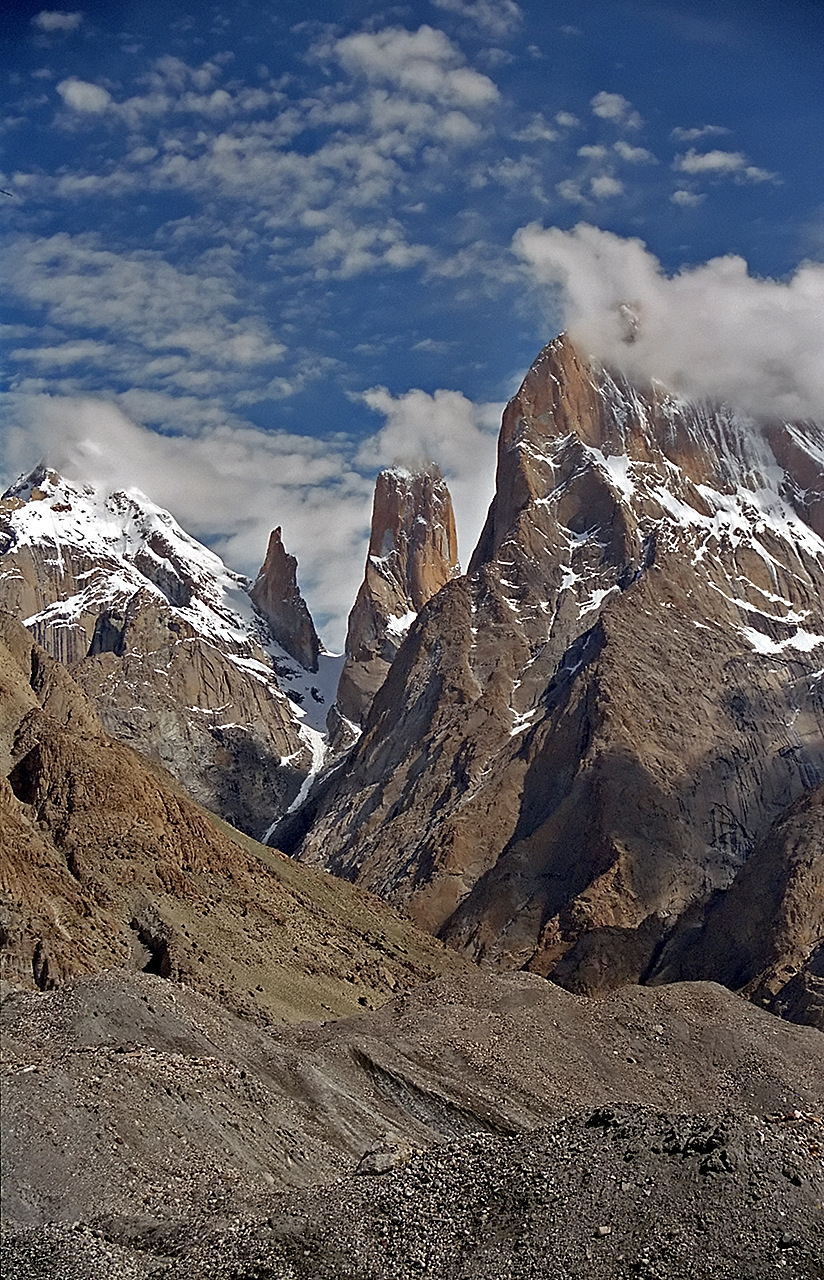
The Trango Towers in northern Pakistan was Doseth's last ascent and resting place

Hans Christian Doseth (December 10, 1958 in Romsdal, Norway – August 6, 1984 in Pakistan) was a Norwegian mountaineer.

== Achievements ==
Among his achievements were several first ascents of routes on Trollveggen (Troll Wall), Romsdal's north facing big wall, both in winter and summer. He did the first all-free ascent of the wall in 1979 (the "Rimmon Route"), and the first winter ascent of the "Swedish Route" (1980). Most notable was his first ascent of the technically difficult "Trollkjerringruta" (the Troll's Wife) in winter (1982), followed by the free ascent in summer 1983. Though moderately graded by today's standards (Norw. grade 7, French grade 6c+), it is a demanding, serious climb through partly loose and poorly protected rock that up to this day has seen only two or three repeats. Doseth also increased awareness of sport climbing in Northern Europe, introducing routes in the 5.12 range (French 7b/c) in Norway and Sweden in the early 80s.

== Death ==
Doseth died along with his climbing partner Finn Dæhli during an expedition with Stein P. Aasheim and Dag Kolsrud on Great Trango Tower (6286 m) in Karakoram, Pakistan. A few hundred meters below the summit, Aasheim and Kolsrud had to turn back due to lack of food. Doseth and Dæhli continued to the summit, but disappeared during descent, after establishing the Norwegian Buttress, the first route to scale the massive east face of the mountain. The causes of the accident are not known.

== Literature ==
- Bø, Bjarte and Anne Grete Nebell, Klatring i Romsdal, 1999.
- Stein P. Aasheim, Trango – triumf og tragedie, Scanbok, 1985
