= Romsdalsbladet =

Norwegian newspaper (1947–1948)

Romsdalsbladet (The Romsdal Gazette) was a newspaper published in Åndalsnes, Norway. It appeared for only two years, in 1947 and 1948. The paper was published by the company Romsdalsk Reising L/L and it was edited by Eirik Moen (1912–2002). The paper was discontinued because of printing difficulties.
