= Kyrkjetaket =

Mountain in Møre og Romsdal, Norway

- Kirketaket
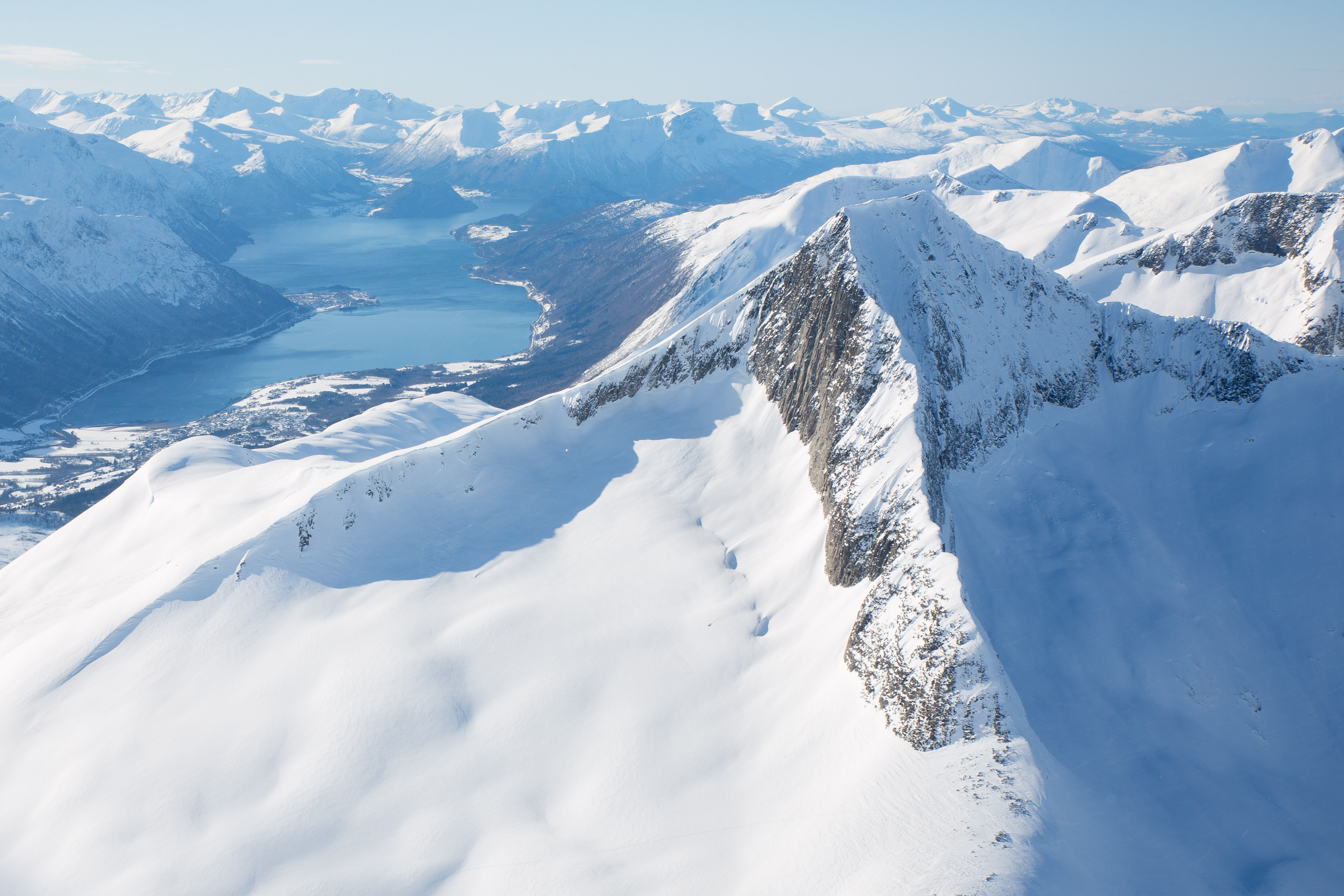
- Kyrkjetaket as seen from the topp of Kjøvskartind

Highest point
- Elevation: 1,439 m (4,721 ft)
- Prominence: 204 m (669 ft)
- Parent peak: Klauva
- Isolation: 1.8 km (1.1 mi)
- Coordinates: 62°36′41″N 7°54′26″E

Geography
- Interactive map of the mountain
- Location: Møre og Romsdal, Norway
- Parent range: Romsdalsalpene
- Topo map: 1320 II Eresfjord

Kyrkjetaket is a mountain on the border of Rauma Municipality and Molde Municipality in Møre og Romsdal county, Norway. The 1,439-metre (4,721 ft) tall peak is located just inside the border of Rauma Municipality, about 7 kilometres (4.3 mi) northeast of the village of Isfjorden and 12.4 kilometres (7.7 mi) from the town of Åndalsnes. The mountain Gjuratinden lies about 9 kilometres (5.6 mi) southeast of Kyrkjetaket. The name Kyrkjetaket translates to "the Church roof".

In February 2004, it was chosen as one of Norway's 10 finest alpine mountains by the magazine Fri Flyt.

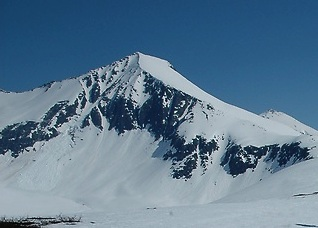
Kyrkjetaket seen from Hestberget, along winter route to the summit.

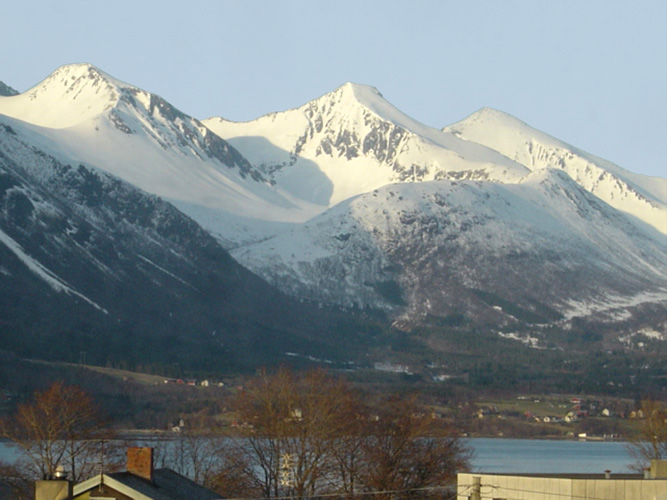
Skarven (from left), Kirketaket and Kjøvskartind, from Åndalsnes.

== See also ==
- List of mountains of Norway
