= Store Venjetinden =

Mountain in Møre og Romsdal, Norway

- Store Vengetinden
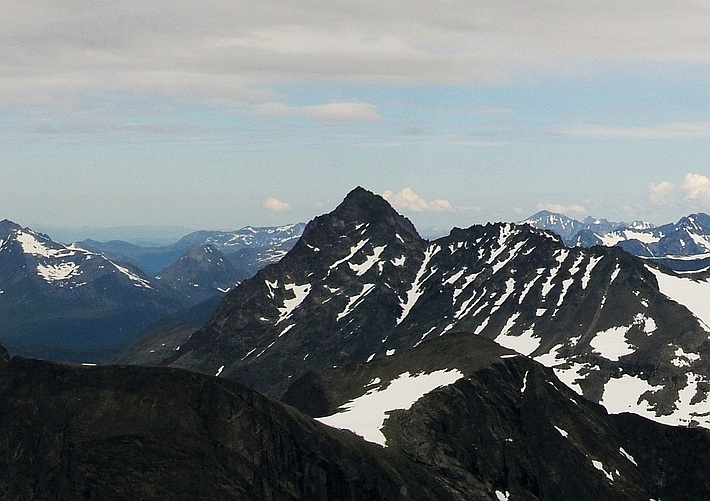
- Store Venjetinden seen from Breitinden

Highest point
- Elevation: 1,852 m (6,076 ft)
- Prominence: 718 m (2,356 ft)
- Parent peak: Kleneggen
- Isolation: 22.6 km (14.0 mi)
- Coordinates: 62.5075°N 7.8397°E

Geography
- Interactive map of the mountain
- Location: Møre og Romsdal, Norway
- Parent range: Romsdalsalpene
- Topo map: 1320 II Eresfjord

Climbing
- First ascent: 18 August 1881, north-east ridge, William Cecil Slingsby and Johannes Vigdal
- Easiest route: Climbing

Store Venjetinden is a mountain in Rauma Municipality in Møre og Romsdal county, Norway. It is located about 3 kilometres (1.9 mi) northeast of the mountain Romsdalshornet, about 4 kilometres (2.5 mi) east of the Rauma river and European Route E136, and about 10 kilometres (6.2 mi) southeast of the town of Åndalsnes. It is the highest summit in the Romsdalsalpane range.

== Ascents ==
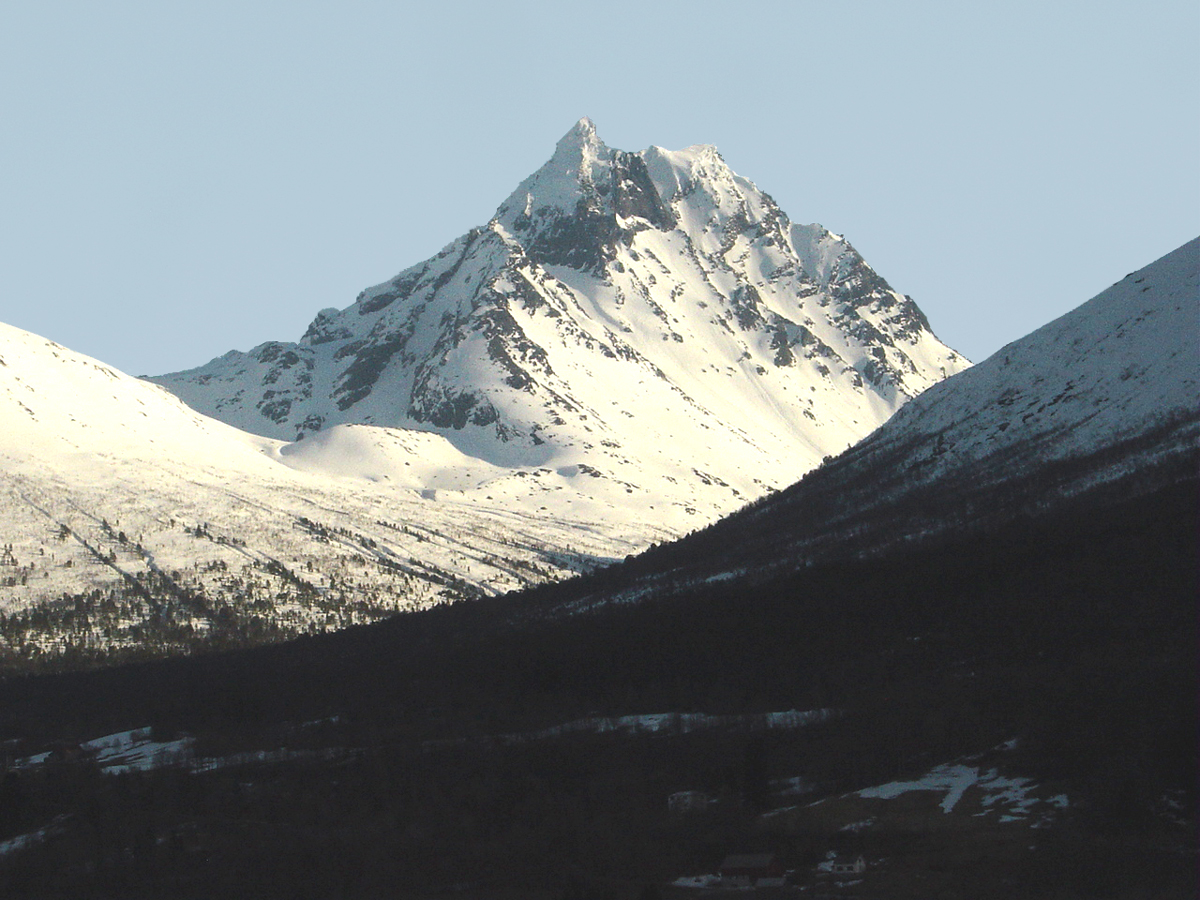
Seen from Isfjorden

The first ascent was via the northeast ridge in 1881 by William Cecil Slingsby and Johannes Vigdal. The first ascent via the western ridge was in 1930 by Erik Heen and Karl Oshaug.

In 2021, the men's world record for the vertical kilometer was set by Spanish mountain runner Kílian Jornet at Venjetinden with a time of 28:48.

== See also ==
- List of mountains of Norway
