= Troll Wall =

North-facing rock face in Norway

- Trollveggen (Norwegian)
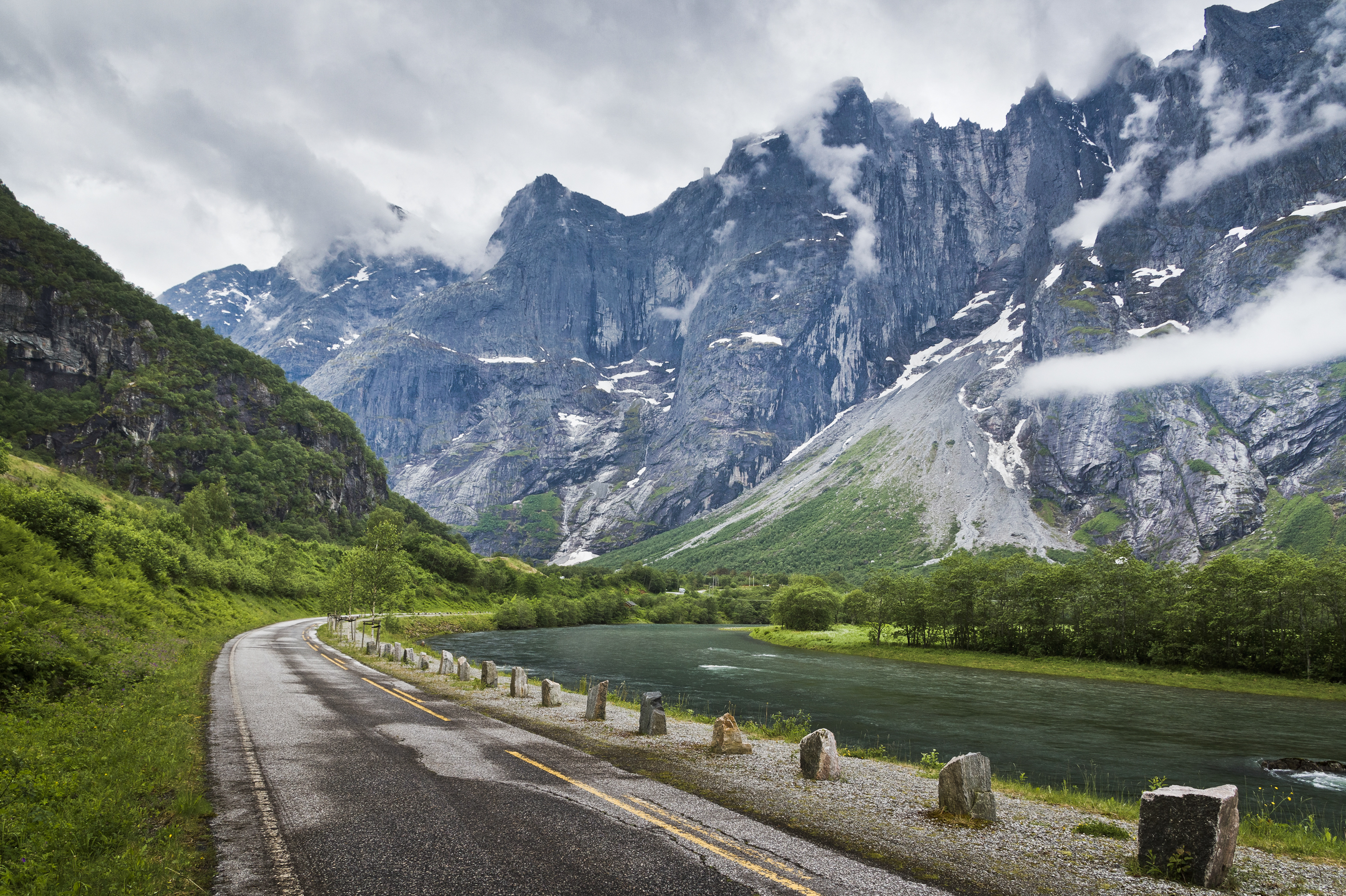
- The Troll Wall. Store Trolltind is the highest point along the ridge.

Highest point
- Elevation: 1,700 m (5,600 ft)
- Coordinates: 62.4824°N 7.7288°E

Geography
- Interactive map of the mountain
- Location: Møre og Romsdal, Norway
- Parent range: Romsdalsalpane
- Topo map: 1319 I Romsdalen

The Troll Wall (Norwegian: Trollveggen) is part of the mountain massif Trolltindene (lit. 'Troll Peaks') in the Romsdalen valley in Rauma Municipality in Møre og Romsdal county, Norway. It is located to the south of the towns of Åndalsnes and Molde inside the Reinheimen National Park.

The Troll Wall is the tallest vertical rock face in Europe, about 1,100 metres (3,600 ft) from its base to the summit of its highest point. At its steepest, the summit ridge overhangs the base of the wall by nearly 50 metres (160 ft). The Rauma River, the Rauma railway and the European route E136 run just to the east of the wall.

The rock is gneiss, formed into a broken rock wall of huge corners, concave roofs, and crack systems, topped with a series of spires and pinnacles on the summit rim. The rock is generally loose, and rockfall is the norm on this north-facing big wall. There was a series of large rockfalls on the wall in September 1998, radically changing the character of several climbing routes.

The wall has been a destination for climbers and BASE jumpers. Carl Boenish, the "father" of BASE jumping, was killed on the Troll Wall in 1984 shortly after setting the world record for the highest BASE jump in history. His wife, Jean Boenish, jumped with him and held the record until Valery Rozov jumped off Cho Oyu in 2017 from 7,700 metres (25,250 ft). BASE jumping from the Troll Wall has been illegal since 1986.

In 2026, background plates for the opening climbing sequence of the Netflix survival thriller Apex were filmed at Troll Wall.

== Climbing history ==
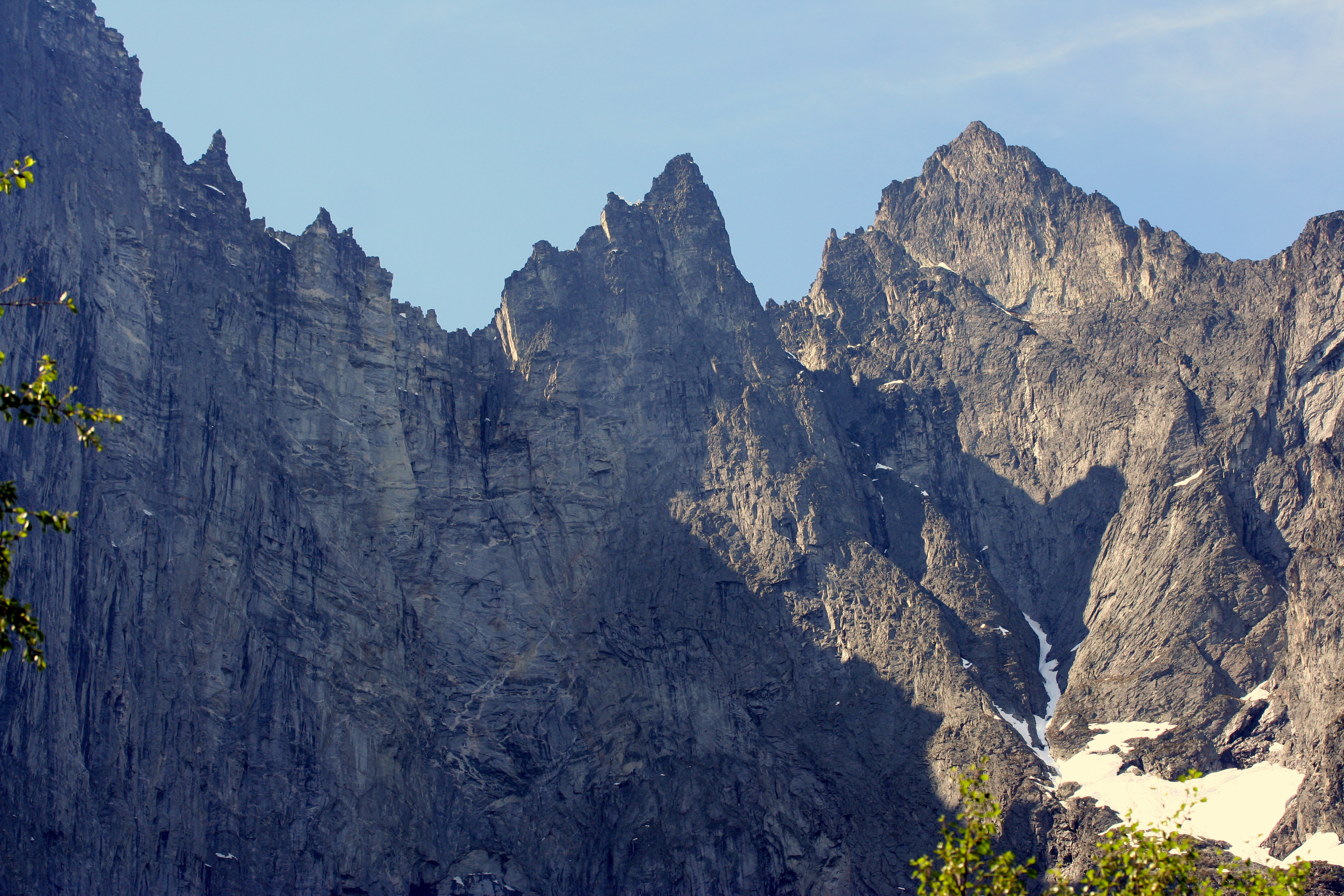
The Troll Wall (left), with the peaks of Brudgommen (The Bridegroom) and Store Trolltind to the right

The Troll Wall was first climbed in 1965 by a Norwegian team consisting of Ole Daniel Enersen, Leif Norman Patterson, Odd Eliassen and Jon Teigland. They finished one day ahead of the British climbers Tony Howard, John Amatt and Bill Tweedale, who established the most popular climbing route on the wall, the Rimmon Route. As of 2003, this route was reported unclimbable because a rockfall in September 1998 destroyed five of its pitches.

The wall saw its first winter ascent in March 1974, when Wojciech Kurtyka from Poland spent 13 days repeating the 1967 French Route.

In 1979, the wall was free climbed for the first time by local climber Hans Christian Doseth and Ragnhild Amundsen.

There are many routes on the wall, ranging in length and difficulty. The classic Rimmon and Swedish routes were normally free-climbed in a day or two until being heavily damaged by the 1998 rock falls. The longer and more engaging aid routes, such as the 1972 test piece Arch Wall (climbed by Ed and Hugh Drummond in 20 days), or the 1986 Death to All/Pretty Blond Vikings, which cuts through the steepest part of the wall, require advanced knowledge of big wall climbing and several days on the wall.

Due to the serious character of the wall, in addition to a cold and damp climate, new routes on Troll Wall are rare. In February 2002, a Russian team established the Krasnoyarsk Route for 19 days. The 1,200 metres (3,900 ft) long Krasnoyarsk, graded f6c+/A4+, is generally thought to be the hardest aid route on the wall and was awarded first prize in the 2002 All Russia Winter Mountaineering Championships.

In July 2010, Arch Wall, previously a serious aid route of difficulty up to A4+, saw its first all-free ascent by local climber Sindre Sæther and his father, Ole Johan. Arch Wall is about 1,200 metres (3,900 ft) of climbing over 37 pitches, and it took the two a total of 36 hours of climbing to reach the summit.

In July 2012, Sindre and Ole Johan Sæther repeated the feat by free climbing the Krasnoyarsk Route.

The most recent contribution to climbs on the Troll Wall is Katharsis, established by Polish climbers Marek Raganowicz and Marcin Tomaszewski over 18 days in January and February 2015. According to Planetmountain.com, the new route shares the first two pitches of the French Route, before forging a line between the Russian Route and Arch Wall. The team reported of difficulties up to A4/M7.

== Other sports ==
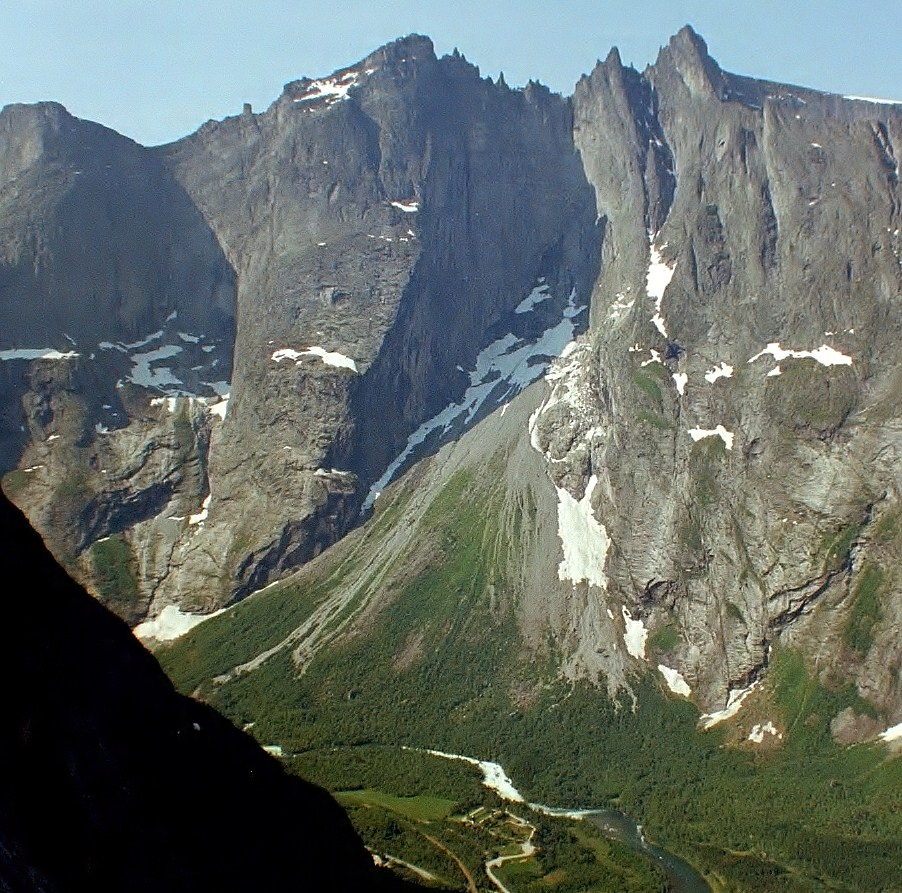
The Troll Wall

In 1980, a new sport debuted when the Finn Jorma Öster made the first parachute jump from the Troll Wall. It was one of the pioneering sites of European BASE jumping during the first half of the 1980s. However, after a number of fatalities, Norwegian authorities made BASE jumping from the Troll Wall illegal on 25 July 1986. Eight BASE jumpers are known to have died at the Troll Wall. The first recorded fatality was Carl Boenish in 1984, while the most recent was in 2012. Despite being illegal, BASE jumpers jump from the Troll Wall most summers, and are generally able to flee before the police arrive.

In February 2018, Spanish ski mountaineer Kilian Jornet was the first to ski down the Troll Wall. He had previously climbed the route.

== See also ==
- Besseggen
- De syv søstre
- Kjerag
- Kjeragbolten
- List of waterfalls
- Preikestolen
- Trollgaren
- Trolltunga
