= Romsdalsalpane =

Mountain range in Møre og Romsdal, Norway

- Romsdal Alps (English); Romsdalsfjella
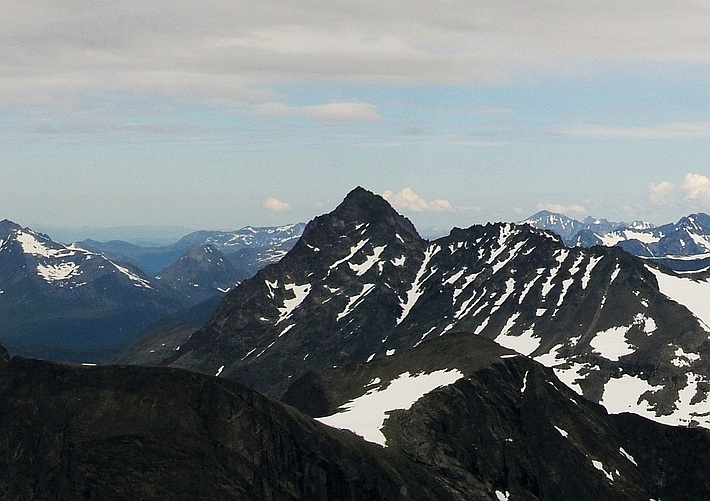
- Store Venjetinden, the highest point in Romsdalsalpane

Highest point
- Peak: Store Venjetinden
- Elevation: 1,852 m (6,076 ft)
- Coordinates: 62.5075°N 7.8397°E

Geography
- Location: Møre og Romsdal, Norway
- Range coordinates: 62°25′N 7°51′E

Romsdalsalpane (Norwegian) or the Romsdal Alps (English) is mountain range surrounding the Romsdalen valley in Møre og Romsdal county, Norway. They are primarily located in Rauma Municipality, Molde Municipality, and Fjord Municipality. The southern part of the mountain range is also located within Reinheimen National Park. The famous Trollstigen road runs over a pass in this mountain range.

Some of the notable mountains in the range include:

- Store Venjetinden at 1,852 metres (6,076 ft)
- Store Trolltinden at 1,788 metres (5,866 ft), the highest point along the Troll Wall ridge
- Trollryggen at 1,740 metres (5,710 ft)
- Romsdalshornet at 1,550 metres (5,090 ft)
- Kyrkjetaket at 1,439 metres (4,721 ft)

== See also ==
- List of mountains of Norway
