= Store Trolltinden =

Mountain in Møre og Romsdal, Norway

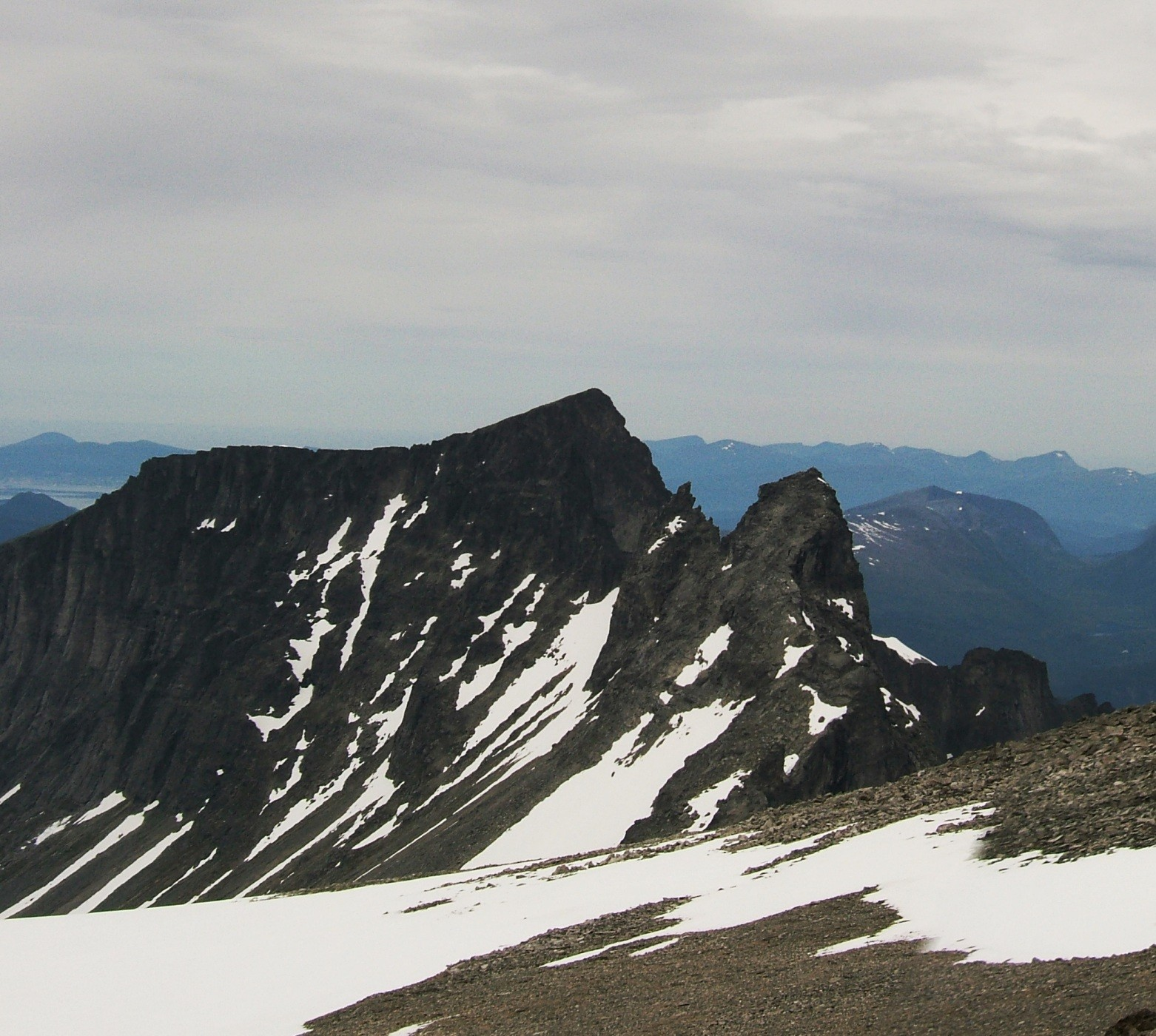
- Seen from Breitinden (south east)

Highest point
- Elevation: 1,788 m (5,866 ft)
- Prominence: 369 m (1,211 ft)
- Parent peak: Breitinden
- Isolation: 3.2 km (2.0 mi) to Breitinden
- Coordinates: 62.4875°N 7.715556°E

Geography
- Interactive map of the mountain
- Location: Møre og Romsdal, Norway
- Parent range: Romsdalsalpane
- Topo map: 1319 I Romsdalen

Climbing
- Easiest route: Climbing

Store Trolltinden a mountain summit in Rauma Municipality in Møre og Romsdal county, Norway. At 1,788 metres (5,866 ft) in height, it is the highest point along the Trolltindane ridge. It has the vertical Trollveggen cliff separating the peak from the Romsdalen valley below, a drop of about 1,700 metres (5,600 ft) which makes it the highest vertical cliff in Europe. The Rauma River and the European route E136 highway lie 1 kilometre (0.62 mi) to the east in the valley. The Trollryggen peak is located about 700 metres (2,300 ft) to the south.

The easiest access to the summit is by walking from the parking lot at Trollstigen about 5 kilometres (3.1 mi) to the southwest. Directly beneath the summit, one might prefer a rope for securing the last climb.

== See also ==
- List of mountains of Norway
