= Åndalsnes =

Town in Møre og Romsdal, Norway

Åndalsnes Aandalsnes (historic)
- Town/City
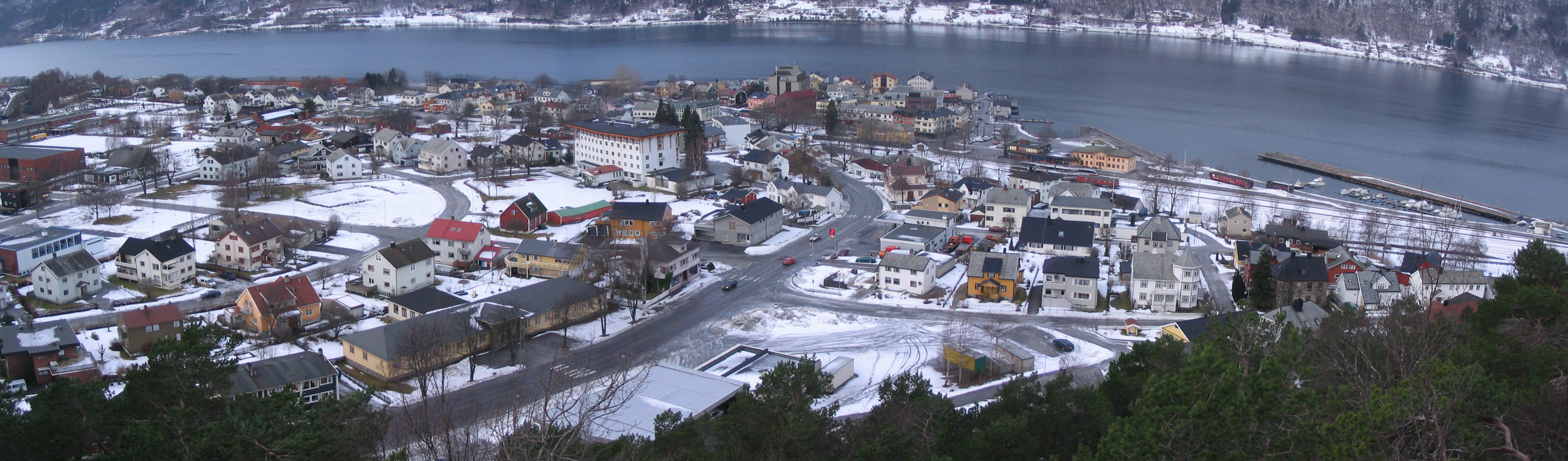
- View of Åndalsnes from the mountain Nebba

- Location within Møre og Romsdal Location within Norway
- Coordinates: 62.5675°N 7.6871°E
- Country: Norway
- Region: Western Norway
- County: Møre og Romsdal
- District: Romsdal
- Municipality: Rauma Municipality
- Established as
- Town (By): 1996

Area
  - Total: 2.16 km^{2} (0.83 sq mi)
- Elevation: 2 m (6.6 ft)

Population (2024)
  - Total: 2,483
  - Density: 1,150/km^{2} (3,000/sq mi)
- Demonym: Åndalsnesing
- Time zone: UTC+01:00 (CET)
  - Summer (DST): UTC+02:00 (CEST)
- Post Code: 6300 Åndalsnes

Åndalsnes is a town in Rauma Municipality in Møre og Romsdal county, Norway. Åndalsnes is also the administrative center of Rauma Municipality. It is located along the Isfjorden, at the mouth of the river Rauma, at the north end of the Romsdalen valley. The village of Isfjorden lies about 7 kilometres (4.3 mi) to the east, Veblungsnes lies just to the west across the Rauma river, and the village of Innfjorden lies about 10 kilometres (6.2 mi) to the southwest via the European Route E136 highway.

The 2.16-square-kilometre (530-acre) town has a population (2024) of 2,483 and a population density of 1,150 inhabitants per square kilometre (3,000/sq mi).

Åndalsnes has an association football club, Åndalsnes IF. The local church is Grytten Church, but its actually located across the river in Veblungsnes. The harbour is called "Tindekaia", and is visited every year by many cruise ships.

== Geography ==
Åndalsnes is located at the mouth of the river Rauma, at the shores of the Romsdalsfjord, one of the first Norwegian rivers to host English fly fishermen in the nineteenth century. The river's salmon population is currently undergoing restoration after seeing strong declines in the 1980s following an infestation of Gyrodactylus salaris, a freshwater fish parasite that mainly affects salmon. As with many other infested rivers, the Rauma is experiencing an increase in the population of sea trout.

The river flows through the Romsdalen valley, which features some of the most spectacular scenery in the entire country. Trollveggen (the Troll Wall) one of the cliff formations in the valley, has a vertical drop of more than 1,000 metres (3,300 ft). It was an early launch site for European BASE jumpers.

== Climate ==
Åndalsnes has an temperate oceanic climate (Cfb in the Köppen climate classification), with relatively mild winters, cool summers and precipitation year round. Late spring/early summer is the time of the year with the least precipitation, while the winter is the wettest. As Ånsdalsnes is sheltered in the fjord, it receives less precipitation than places further out to the coast like Molde. Åndalsnes experiences large temperature swings during the winter. Days with temperatures of below -10°C due to temperature inversions can quickly be followed up by temperatures exceeding 10°C and even 15°C due to Föhn winds from the south-west.

Climate data for Åndalsnes - Kamshaugen 1991–2020 (3 m)
Month	Jan	Feb	Mar	Apr	May	Jun	Jul	Aug	Sep	Oct	Nov	Dec	Year
Daily mean °C (°F)	1.1 (34.0)	0.8 (33.4)	2.7 (36.9)	6.1 (43.0)	9.2 (48.6)	12.1 (53.8)	14.9 (58.8)	14.5 (58.1)	11.4 (52.5)	7.0 (44.6)	3.9 (39.0)	1.2 (34.2)	7.1 (44.7)
Average precipitation mm (inches)	123 (4.8)	109 (4.3)	106 (4.2)	67 (2.6)	68 (2.7)	84 (3.3)	79 (3.1)	92 (3.6)	130 (5.1)	129 (5.1)	112 (4.4)	149 (5.9)	1,248 (49.1)
Source: yr.no history

== Transportation ==
The European route E136 highway and Norwegian County Road 64 pass through Åndalsnes. County Road 64 heads to the towns of Molde and Kristiansund to the north and the E136 highway heads to the town of Ålesund to the west and to Dombås to the southeast.

Trains on the Rauma Line terminate at the port of Åndalsnes, with bus connections to the nearby towns of Molde and Ålesund.

== History ==
The village of Åndalsnes was the administrative centre of the old Grytten Municipality from 1838 until 1964, when Grytten was merged with several other municipalities to form the new Rauma Municipality. Åndalsnes then became the administrative centre of the new municipality of Rauma.

During World War II, after the German invasion of Norway in April 1940, British troops landed in Åndalsnes as a part of a pincer movement to take the mid-Norwegian city of Trondheim. The northern arm of the attack was based in Namsos. Lacking control of the air, the forces at Åndalsnes were withdrawn in early May 1940. Margaret Reid, a British intelligence officer who had already been displaced from Berlin, via Copenhagen, was one of those evacuated.

At the waterfront here, rigs were built to develop off-shore oil and gas wells in the North Sea, with the railroad bringing steel, etc.to the water's edge, and the rigs taken out to sea, past Ålesund, through the fjord waters.

In 1996, the municipal council of Rauma Municipality declared Åndalsnes a town (Norwegian: By).

== Media ==
The newspaper Romsdalsbladet was published in Åndalsnes from 1947 to 1948.

The town's newspaper, Åndalsnes Avis, had a circulation of 4,125 in 2007.

== Notable people ==
Notable people that were born or lived in Åndalsnes include:

- Kitty Lossius, teacher and novelist
- Kílian Jornet Burgada

== Gallery ==
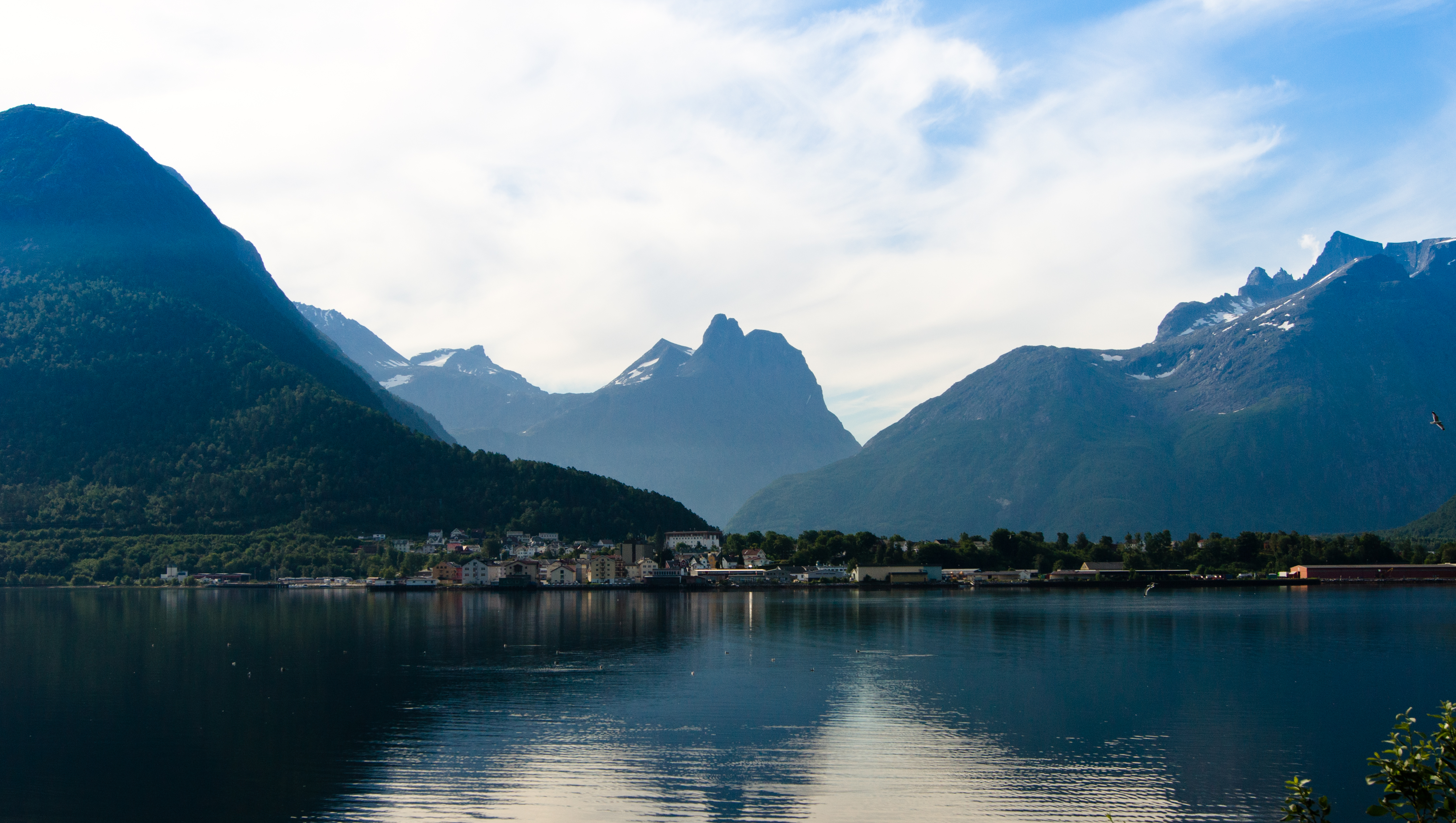
Åndalsnes

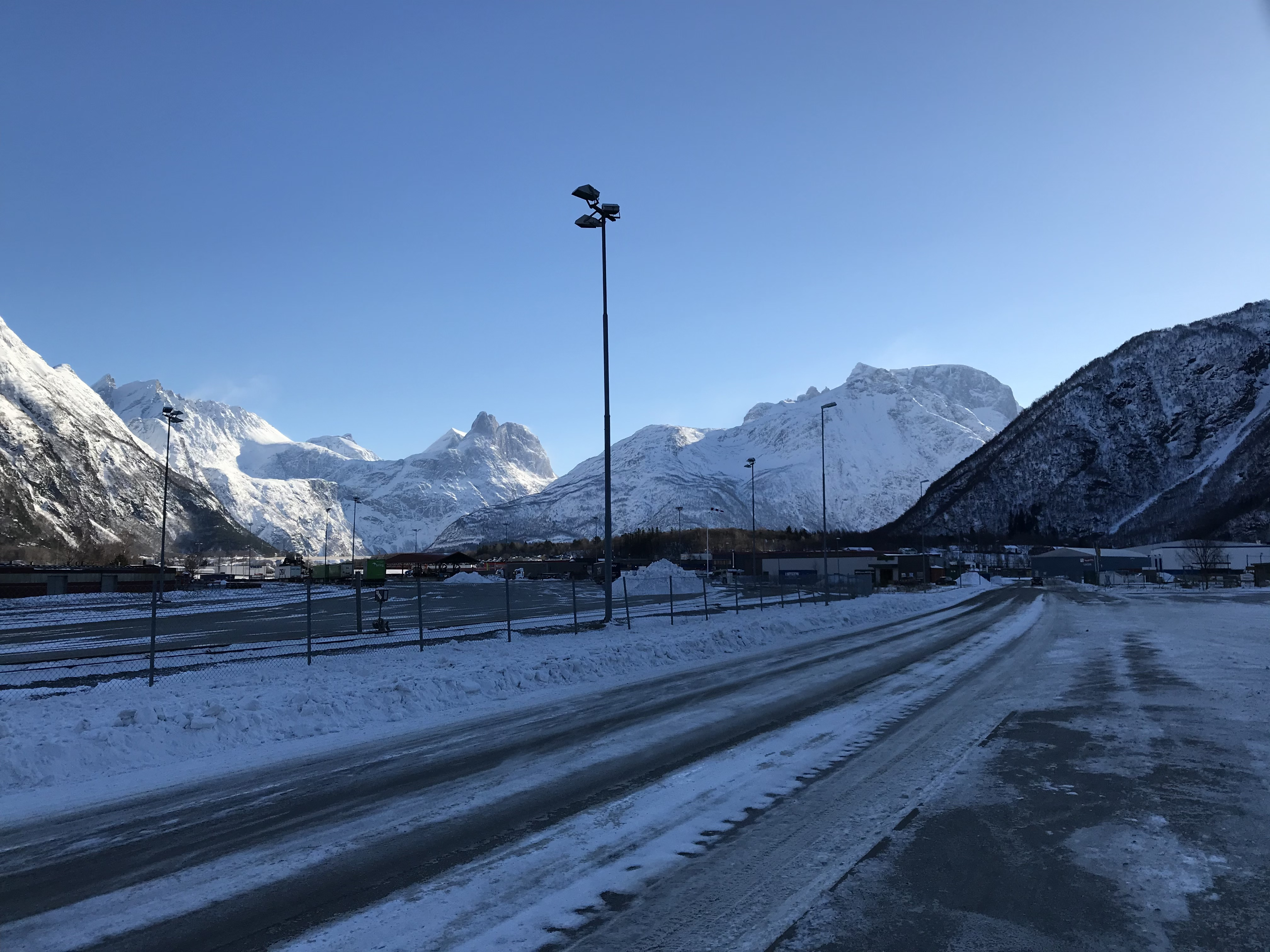
Winter in Åndalsnes

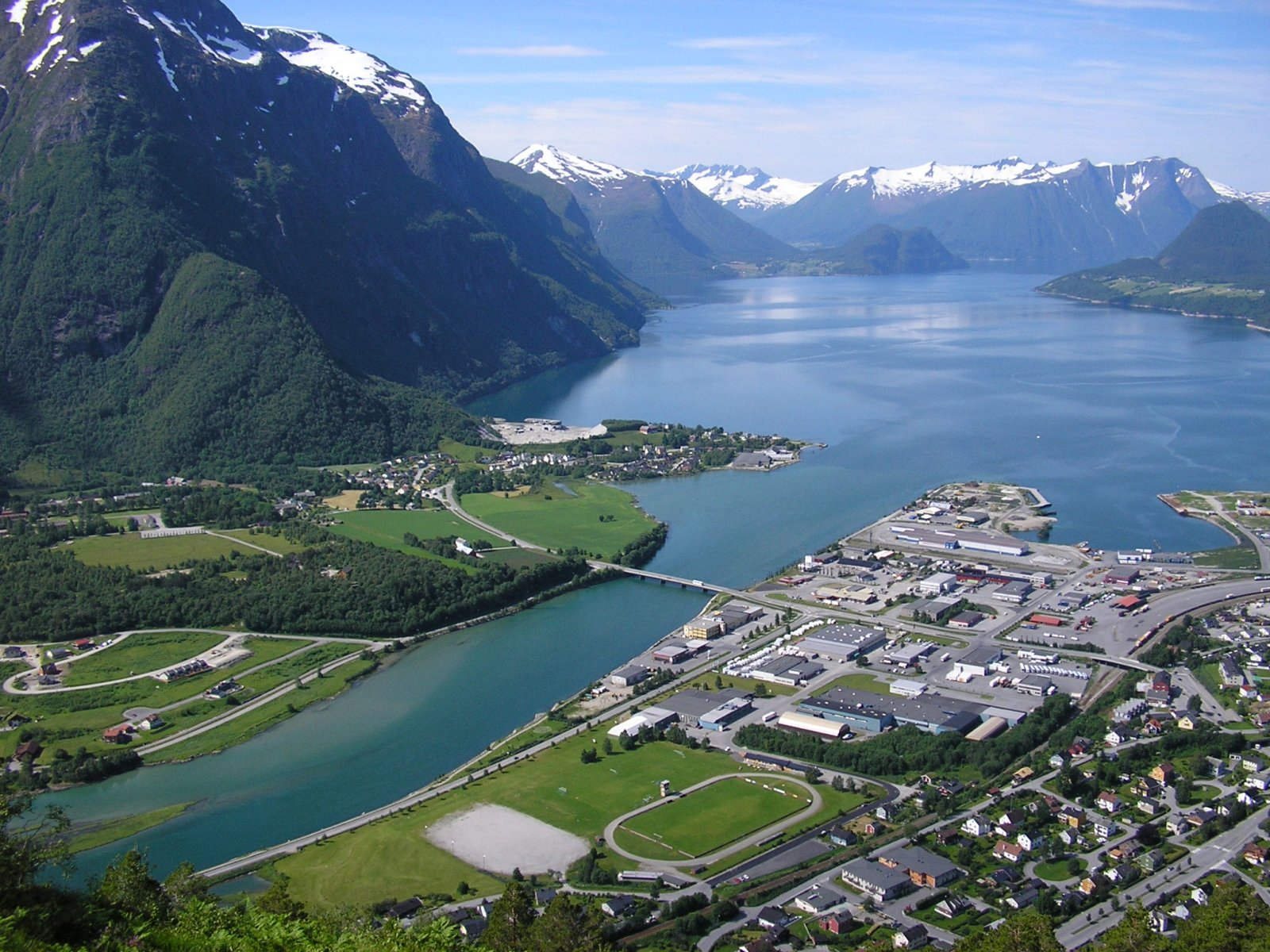
View of the port area and mouth of the river

== See also ==
- List of towns and cities in Norway
