= Kristiansund (disambiguation) =

Kristiansund may refer to:

== Places ==
- Kristiansund Municipality, a municipality in Møre og Romsdal county, Norway
- Kristiansund (town), a town within Kristiansund Municipality in Møre og Romsdal county, Norway

== Sports ==
- Kristiansund BK, a Norwegian association football club located in Kristiansund, Norway
- Kristiansund FK, a former Norwegian association football club located in Kristiansund, Norway
- Kristiansund Stadion, a football stadium located at Karihola in Kristiansund, Norway

== Transportation ==
- Kristiansund Airport, Kvernberget, an airport in Kristiansund, Norway
