= Omsund Bridge =

Omsund Bridge Omsundbrua
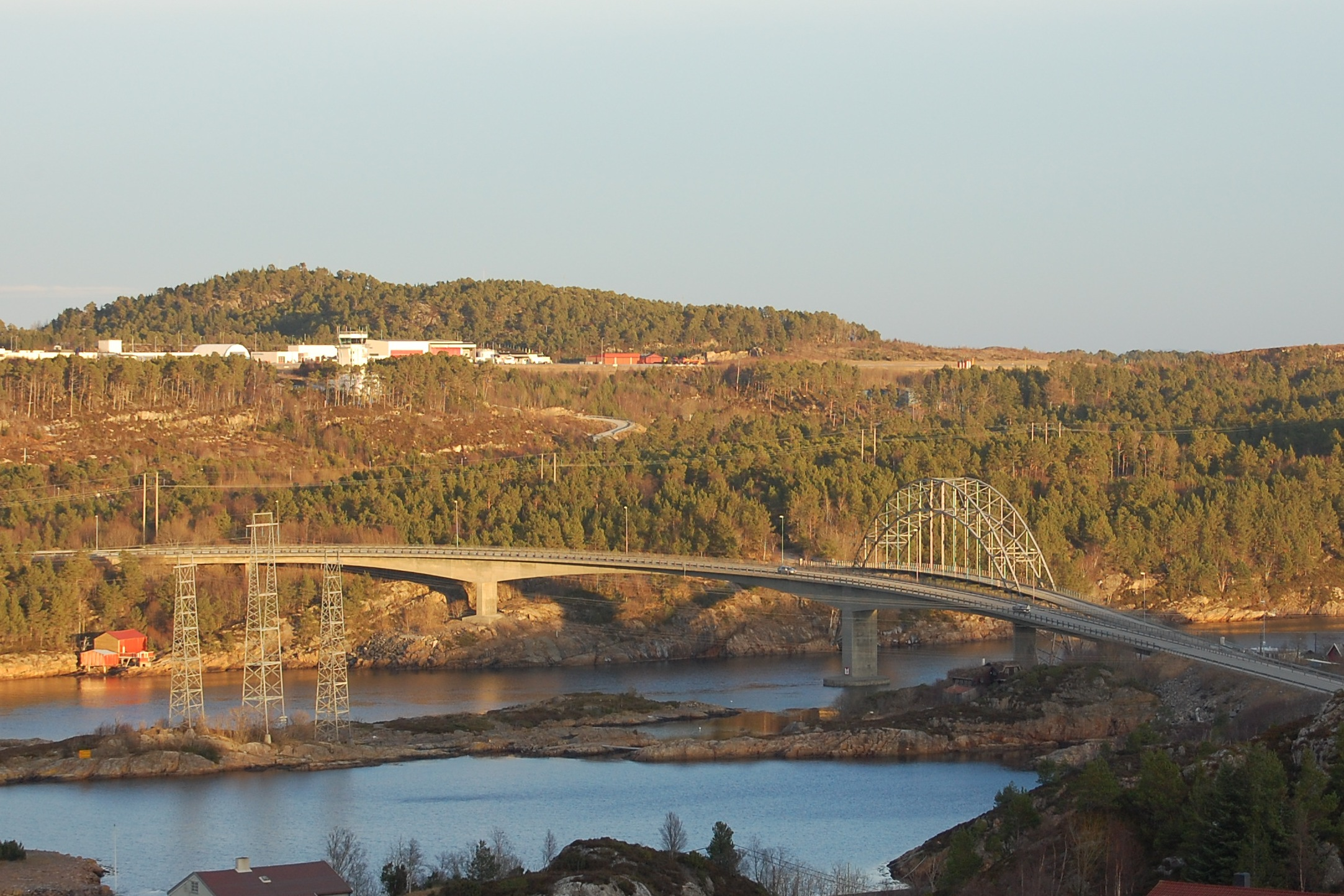
- The two bridges seen from Frei
- Coordinates: 63.1046°N 7.8216°E
- Carries: Rv70
- Crosses: Omsundet
- Locale: Kristiansund, Norway

Characteristics
- Design: Cantilever bridge
- Material: Concrete
- Total length: 292 metres (958 ft)
- No. of spans: 3
- Clearance above: 18

History
- Opened: 1981

Statistics
- Daily traffic: 9,500 (2012)

The Omsund Bridge (Norwegian: Omsundbrua) is a bridge that crosses the strait Omsundet between the islands of Frei and Nordlandet in Kristiansund Municipality in Møre og Romsdal county, Norway. The link is actually made up of two bridges: The main bridge crosses form Nordlandet to the islet of Rensvikholmen and then the smaller Rensviksundet bridge completes the crossing to Frei.

Prior to the merger of Kristiansund Municipality and Frei Municipality on 1 January 2008, the bridges crossed the border between the two municipalities. The original bridge was in use from 1940 until 1981. The second bridge is currently in use, and a third bridge has been proposed. The bridges lies just south of the Kristiansund Airport, Kvernberget.

== Old bridge ==
A bridge crossing of Omsundet was initially proposed in 1875 by the town engineer in Kristiansund, colonel Christian Fredrik Bødtker, together with a bridge crossing of Nordsundet, but no bridges were built.

The 200-metre (660 ft) long original bridge is a steel through arch bridge. The Omsund Bridge was opened for traffic in April 1940, but with no opening ceremony because of World War II and the invasion of Norway. Local young men just tore down the barricades in the middle of the night.

On 22 April 1940, German bombers tried to destroy the new bridge, but missed and managed only to kill the 15-year-old boy Ingolf Helge Vatten on a bicycle several hundred meters away on Frei, and set the forest on fire on Nordlandet. Remains of one of the bombs that caused the wildfire are on display next to the abutment. In May that year, the new bridge was crucial during the emergency evacuation caused by the burning of Kristiansund.

This bridge to the island of Frei made it possible to shorten the ferry between Kristiansund and Gjemnes Municipality on the mainland by 15 kilometres (9.3 mi), when a new road crossing Frei to Kvitnes on Flatsetøya was completed in 1951. The ferry was finally replaced with the undersea Freifjord Tunnel in 1992 as part of the Kristiansund Mainland Connection.

The old bridge was replaced in 1981, but it finally opened officially in a ceremony on 24 April 2005, 65 years late, and 24 years after it was replaced. It was then made accessible again for pedestrians and cyclists, and protected as an important sample of Norwegian bridges built in the 1930s.

== Current bridge ==
A new 292-metre (958 ft) long concrete cantilever bridge, with two lanes and a fenced walkway for pedestrians and cyclists, was built right alongside of the old, narrow bridge in 1981. The bridge carries Norwegian National Road 70, in that area named Freikollveien.

The main spans horizontal curvature was unusually tight, for a concrete cantilever bridge of the time. In the New Year's Day Storm of 1992, the bridge was hit by a large shrimp trawler, and concrete degradation repair was performed on the bridge in 2013.

== Future bridge ==
On 18 March 2010, preliminary plans for a new 600-metre (2,000 ft) long replacement bridge were unveiled, as a part of a future, larger highway to Kristiansund.

== See also ==
- List of bridges in Norway
- List of bridges in Norway by length
- List of bridges
- List of bridges by length
