= Gamle Eirikssen =

Norwegian monarch

- Born: c. 910
- Died: 955
- House: Fairhair
- Father: Eric Bloodaxe
- Mother: Gunnhild, Mother of Kings

Gamle Eirikssen (c. 910–955) (Old Norse: Gamli Eiríksson) was a 10th-century Norwegian ruler. He was born about 910 in Norway. He was the eldest son of King Eric Bloodaxe and his Queen Gunnhild. He was named after Gunhild's father, the Danish king Gorm the Old (Danish: Gorm den Gamle). Gamle is said to have died in 955 fighting against king Hákon the Good near the village of Nedre Frei during the Battle of Rastarkalv on the island of Frei in Nordmøre.

== Legacy ==
Gamle's death was avenged by Harald Greycloak, who killed Hákon at the Battle of Fitjar. According to several kings' sagas this was the subject of an exchange of Skaldic stanzas between the opposing skalds Glúmr Geirason and Eyvindr skáldaspillir. Glúmr began with a bragging stanza praising king Harald:

Original

Vel hefr hefnt, en hafna / hjǫrs berdraugar fjǫrvi,
— folkrakkr, of vannt, fylkir, / framligt — Haraldr Gamla,
es dǫkkvalir drekka / dolgbands fyr ver handan
— roðin frák rauðra benja / reyr — Hǫ́kunar dreyra.

Translation:
English

Haraldr has avenged Gamli well, and the bare logs of the sword [WARRIORS] give up life — battle-bold leader, you fought outstandingly —, when the dark falcons of the battle-god [= Óðinn > RAVENS] drink Hákon's blood across the sea; I have heard that reeds of red wounds [SPEARS] were reddened.

To this, Eyvindr retorted by insulting the memory of Gamle and praising the dead king Hákon:

Original

Fyrr rauð Fenris varra / flugvarr konungr sparra
— malmhríðar svall meiðum / móðr — í Gamla blóði,
þás óstirfinn arfa / Eiríks of rak — geira
nú tregr gæti-Gauta / grams fall — á sæ alla.

Translation:
English

Earlier the flight-reluctant king [Hákon] reddened the prop of the lips of Fenrir <wolf> [SWORD] in Gamli's blood; courage swelled in the trees of the metal-storm [BATTLE > WARRIORS], when, agreeable, he drove all Eiríkr's heirs to sea; now the fall of the king distresses the guarding Gautar <= Óðinn's> of spears [WARRIORS].
