= Frei Municipality =

Former municipality in Møre og Romsdal, Norway

Frei Municipality Frei kommune
- Former municipality
- Fredø herred (historic name)
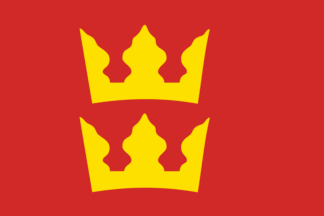
- Flag Coat of arms

- Møre og Romsdal within Norway

- Frei within Møre og Romsdal
- Coordinates: 63°03′45″N 07°48′11″E
- Country: Norway
- County: Møre og Romsdal
- District: Nordmøre
- Established: 1 Jan 1838
  - Created as: Formannskapsdistrikt
- Disestablished: 1 Jan 2008
  - Succeeded by: Kristiansund Municipality
- Administrative centre: Rensvik

Government
  - Mayor (1999–2007): Maritta B. Ohrstrand (Sp)

Area (upon dissolution)
  - Total: 64.80 km^{2} (25.02 sq mi)
  - Land: 63.69 km^{2} (24.59 sq mi)
  - Water: 1.11 km^{2} (0.43 sq mi) 1.7%
  - Rank: #410 in Norway
- Highest elevation: 629.23 m (2,064.4 ft)

Population (2007)
  - Total: 5,428
  - Rank: #184 in Norway
  - Density: 83.8/km^{2} (217/sq mi)
  - Change (10 years): ▲ +6.8%
- Demonym: Freiøying

Official language
  - Norwegian form: Neutral
- Time zone: UTC+01:00 (CET)
  - Summer (DST): UTC+02:00 (CEST)
- ISO 3166 code: NO-1556

Frei is a former municipality in Møre og Romsdal county, Norway. The 65-square-kilometre (25 sq mi) municipality existed from 1838 until its dissolution in 2008 when it was incorporated into Kristiansund Municipality. It was located between the Kvernesfjorden and Freifjorden, primarily including the island of Frei and the smaller surrounding islands.

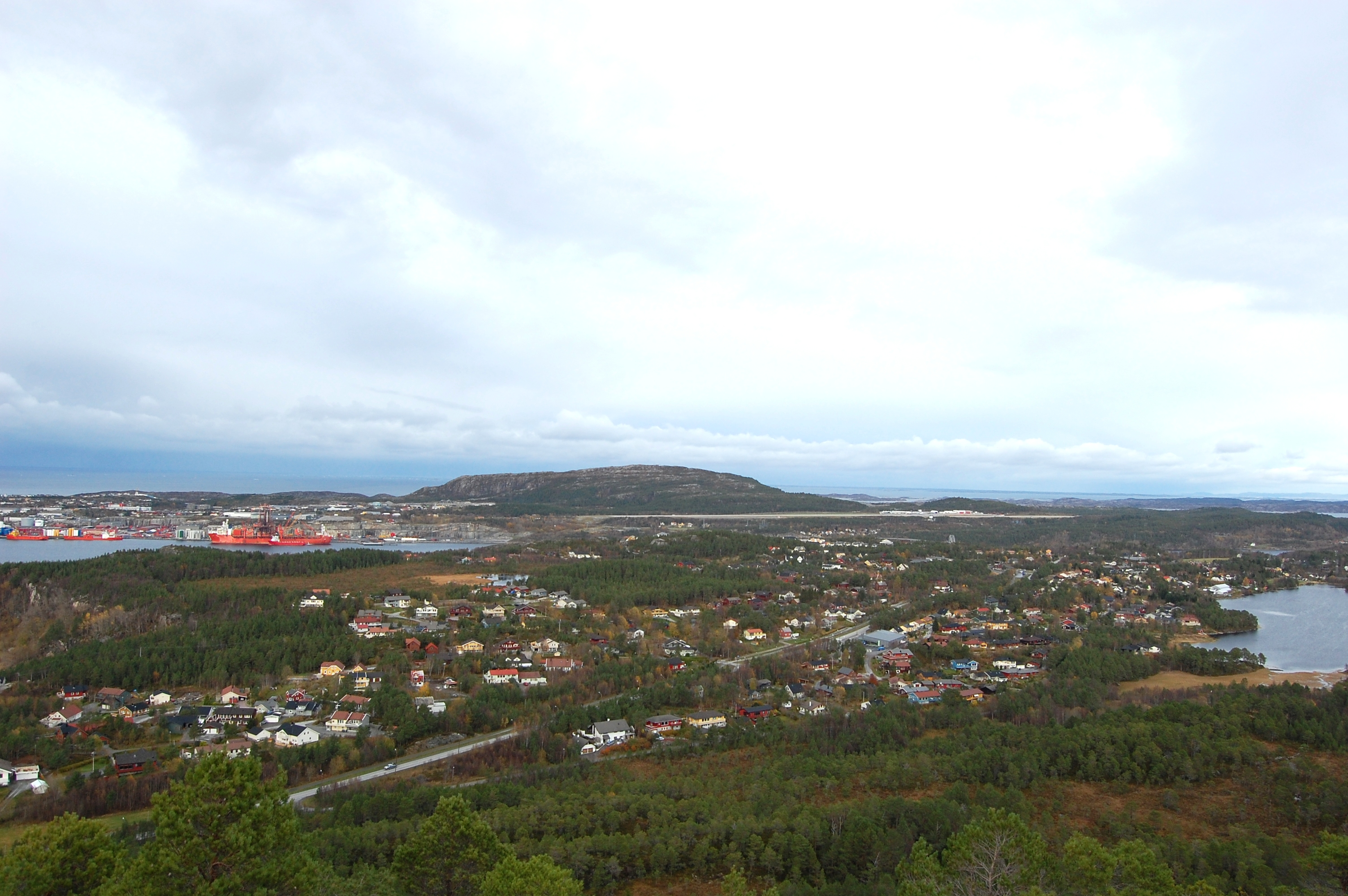
View of Rensvik, the largest urban area in Frei

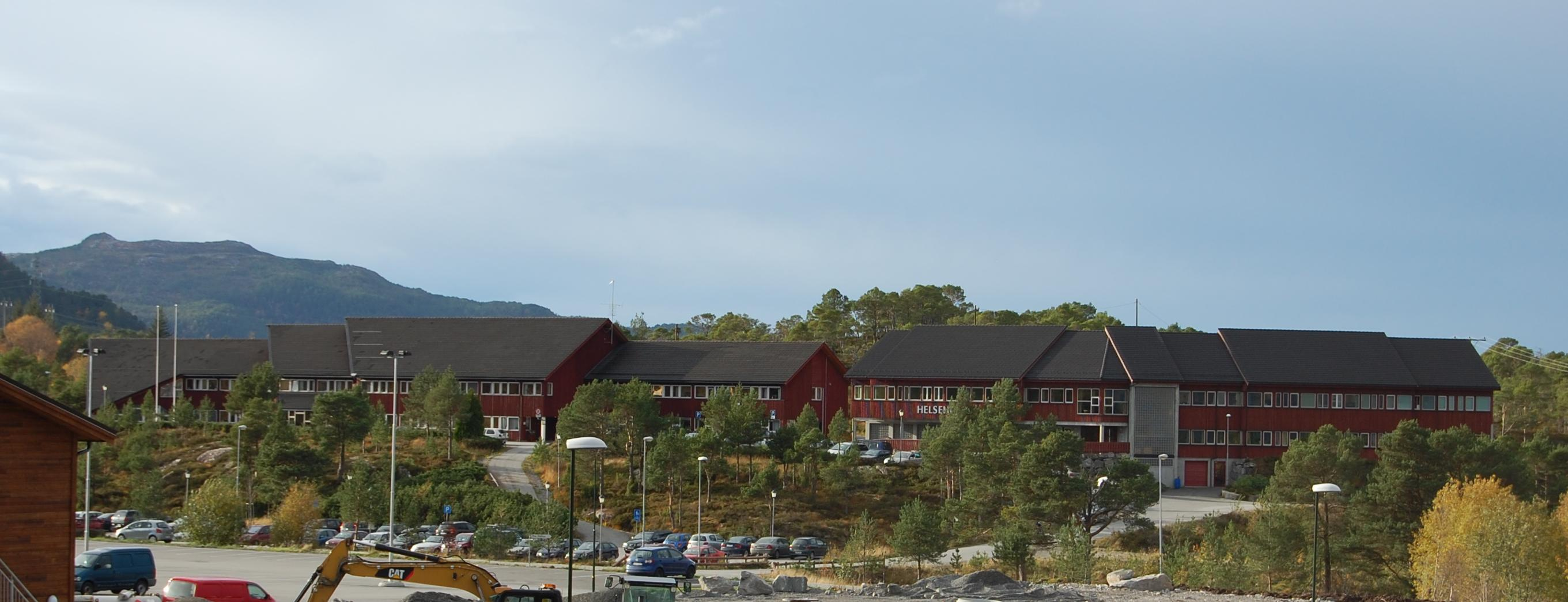
View of the old municipal offices for Frei Municipality

The administrative centre of the municipality was the village of Rensvik, the largest village on the island, located on the northern end of the island. Other main villages that were in Frei Municipality included the villages of Nedre Frei and Storbakken, both located on the southern end of the island and the village of Kvalvåg, located on the eastern side of the island. The main church for the municipality was Frei Church, located in the village of Nedre Frei.

Prior to its dissolution in 2008, the 64.8-square-kilometre (25.0 sq mi) municipality was the 410th largest by area out of the 431F municipalities in Norway. Frei Municipality was the 184th most populous municipality in Norway with a population of about 5,428. The municipality's population density was 83.8 inhabitants per square kilometre (217/sq mi) and its population had increased by 6.8% over the previous 10-year period.

== General information ==
The municipality of Fredø (later spelled Frei) was established on 1 January 1838 (see formannskapsdistrikt law). On 1 January 1882, a small part of Fredø Municipality (population: 40) was merged into the neighboring Øre Municipality to the south. On 1 September 1893, an area of Frei Municipality (population: 231) was merged into the newly-created Gjemnes Municipality. In 1897, the Grip archipelago (population: 198) was separated from Frei Municipality to form the new Grip Municipality.

During the 1960s, there were many municipal mergers across Norway due to the work of the Schei Committee. On 1 January 1964, the northern part of the island of Frei (population: 884) was transferred from Bremsnes Municipality to Frei Municipality. Also on the same date, the part of Frei Municipality that was located on the island of Aspøya (population: 147) was transferred to the neighboring Tingvoll Municipality. On 1 January 2008, Frei Municipality ceased to exist when it was merged into the neighboring Kristiansund Municipality to the north.

=== Name ===
The municipality is named after the island of Frei (Old Norse: Freiðr). The name's original meaning is unknown, but it may be derived from fríðr which means "lovely", "beautiful", or "fair". Prior to 1889, the name was spelled Fredø.

=== Coat of arms ===
The coat of arms was granted on 6 February 1987 and it was in use until 2008 when the municipality ceased to exist. The official blazon is "Gules, two crowns Or in pale" (Norwegian: I rødt to gull kroner, 1-1). This means the arms have a red field (background) and the charge is a two gold crowns. The crowns have a tincture of Or which means they are commonly colored yellow, but if the shield is made out of metal, then gold is used. The two crowns symbolize the relationship between Frei and two Norwegian Kings: King Haakon the Good had a hunting lodge in Bjerkestrand in Frei in the 10th century, and the King and the villagers took part on the Battle of Rastarkalv in the municipality in the year 955. King Haakon VII visited the village in 1955 at the 1000th anniversary of the battle. The arms were designed by the local architect and painter Nils Fiske. The municipal flag has the same design as the coat of arms.

=== Churches ===
The Church of Norway had one parish (sokn) within Frei Municipality. It was part of the Ytre Nordmøre prosti (deanery) in the Diocese of Møre.

Churches in Frei Municipality
Parish (sokn)	Church name	Location of the church	Year built
Frei	Frei Church	Nedre Frei	1897

== Geography ==
The municipality was located between the Kvernesfjorden and Freifjorden, primarily including the island of Frei and the smaller surrounding islands. Kristiansund Municipality was located to the north, Aure Municipality was to the northeast, Tingvoll Municipality was to the southeast, Gjemnes Municipality was to the south, and Averøy Municipality was to the west. The highest point in the municipality was the 629.23-metre (2,064.4 ft) tall mountain Freikollen on the island of Frei.

== Government ==
While it existed, Frei Municipality was responsible for primary education (through 10th grade), outpatient health services, senior citizen services, welfare and other social services, zoning, economic development, and municipal roads and utilities. The municipality was governed by a municipal council of directly elected representatives. The mayor was indirectly elected by a vote of the municipal council. The municipality was under the jurisdiction of the Frostating Court of Appeal.

=== Municipal council ===
The municipal council (Kommunestyre) of Frei Municipality was made up of 23 representatives that were elected to four year terms. The tables below show the historical composition of the council by political party.

Frei kommunestyre 2003–2007
Party name (in Norwegian)	Number of representatives
Labour Party (Arbeiderpartiet)	4
Progress Party (Fremskrittspartiet)	5
Conservative Party (Høyre)	3
Christian Democratic Party (Kristelig Folkeparti)	2
Centre Party (Senterpartiet)	4
Socialist Left Party (Sosialistisk Venstreparti)	2
Children's Party (Oppvekstpartiet)	3
Total number of members:	23

Frei kommunestyre 1999–2003
Party name (in Norwegian)	Number of representatives
Labour Party (Arbeiderpartiet)	7
Progress Party (Fremskrittspartiet)	1
Conservative Party (Høyre)	4
Christian Democratic Party (Kristelig Folkeparti)	2
Centre Party (Senterpartiet)	7
Socialist Left Party (Sosialistisk Venstreparti)	1
Liberal Party (Venstre)	1
Frei free voters (Frei frie velgere)	2
Total number of members:	25

Frei kommunestyre 1995–1999
Party name (in Norwegian)	Number of representatives
Labour Party (Arbeiderpartiet)	7
Conservative Party (Høyre)	3
Christian Democratic Party (Kristelig Folkeparti)	2
Centre Party (Senterpartiet)	1
Socialist Left Party (Sosialistisk Venstreparti)	1
Liberal Party (Venstre)	1
Free voters (Frie velgere)	10
Total number of members:	25

Frei kommunestyre 1991–1995
Party name (in Norwegian)	Number of representatives
Labour Party (Arbeiderpartiet)	6
Conservative Party (Høyre)	4
Christian Democratic Party (Kristelig Folkeparti)	3
Centre Party (Senterpartiet)	1
Socialist Left Party (Sosialistisk Venstreparti)	3
Liberal Party (Venstre)	1
Free voters (Frie velgere)	7
Total number of members:	25

Frei kommunestyre 1987–1991
Party name (in Norwegian)	Number of representatives
Labour Party (Arbeiderpartiet)	11
Conservative Party (Høyre)	4
Christian Democratic Party (Kristelig Folkeparti)	3
Centre Party (Senterpartiet)	1
Liberal Party (Venstre)	2
Free Voters (Frie Velgere)	4
Total number of members:	25

Frei kommunestyre 1983–1987
Party name (in Norwegian)	Number of representatives
Labour Party (Arbeiderpartiet)	10
Progress Party (Fremskrittspartiet)	2
Conservative Party (Høyre)	4
Christian Democratic Party (Kristelig Folkeparti)	2
Centre Party (Senterpartiet)	1
Liberal Party (Venstre)	2
Total number of members:	21

Frei kommunestyre 1979–1983
Party name (in Norwegian)	Number of representatives
Labour Party (Arbeiderpartiet)	7
Progress Party (Fremskrittspartiet)	1
Conservative Party (Høyre)	4
Christian Democratic Party (Kristelig Folkeparti)	3
Centre Party (Senterpartiet)	3
Liberal Party (Venstre)	3
Total number of members:	21

Frei kommunestyre 1975–1979
Party name (in Norwegian)	Number of representatives
Labour Party (Arbeiderpartiet)	9
Conservative Party (Høyre)	1
Christian Democratic Party (Kristelig Folkeparti)	3
Centre Party (Senterpartiet)	4
Liberal Party (Venstre)	4
Total number of members:	21

Frei kommunestyre 1971–1975
Party name (in Norwegian)	Number of representatives
Labour Party (Arbeiderpartiet)	9
Christian Democratic Party (Kristelig Folkeparti)	3
Centre Party (Senterpartiet)	5
Liberal Party (Venstre)	4
Total number of members:	21

Frei kommunestyre 1967–1971
Party name (in Norwegian)	Number of representatives
Labour Party (Arbeiderpartiet)	11
Christian Democratic Party (Kristelig Folkeparti)	4
Centre Party (Senterpartiet)	2
Liberal Party (Venstre)	4
Total number of members:	21

Frei kommunestyre 1963–1967
Party name (in Norwegian)	Number of representatives
Labour Party (Arbeiderpartiet)	10
Christian Democratic Party (Kristelig Folkeparti)	6
Centre Party (Senterpartiet)	3
Local List(s) (Lokale lister)	2
Total number of members:	21

Frei herredsstyre 1959–1963
Party name (in Norwegian)	Number of representatives
Labour Party (Arbeiderpartiet)	6
Christian Democratic Party (Kristelig Folkeparti)	5
Joint List(s) of Non-Socialist Parties (Borgerlige Felleslister)	6
Total number of members:	17

Frei herredsstyre 1955–1959
Party name (in Norwegian)	Number of representatives
Labour Party (Arbeiderpartiet)	6
Christian Democratic Party (Kristelig Folkeparti)	7
Joint List(s) of Non-Socialist Parties (Borgerlige Felleslister)	4
Total number of members:	17

Frei herredsstyre 1951–1955
Party name (in Norwegian)	Number of representatives
Labour Party (Arbeiderpartiet)	3
Christian Democratic Party (Kristelig Folkeparti)	6
Joint List(s) of Non-Socialist Parties (Borgerlige Felleslister)	3
Total number of members:	12

Frei herredsstyre 1947–1951
Party name (in Norwegian)	Number of representatives
Labour Party (Arbeiderpartiet)	3
Christian Democratic Party (Kristelig Folkeparti)	5
Joint List(s) of Non-Socialist Parties (Borgerlige Felleslister)	4
Total number of members:	12

Frei herredsstyre 1945–1947
Party name (in Norwegian)	Number of representatives
Labour Party (Arbeiderpartiet)	4
Christian Democratic Party (Kristelig Folkeparti)	4
Joint List(s) of Non-Socialist Parties (Borgerlige Felleslister)	2
Local List(s) (Lokale lister)	2
Total number of members:	12

Frei herredsstyre 1937–1941*
Party name (in Norwegian)	Number of representatives
Local List(s) (Lokale lister)	12
Total number of members:	12
Note: Due to the German occupation of Norway during World War II, no elections were held for new municipal councils until after the war ended in 1945.

=== Mayors ===
The mayor (Norwegian: ordfører) of Frei Municipality was the political leader of the municipality and the chairperson of the municipal council. The following people have held this position:

- 1838–1841: Einer Eriksen Aspen
- 1842–1843: Robert Williamsen
- 1844–1847: Ole Aslaksen Sandnes
- 1848–1851: Einer Eriksen Aspen
- 1852–1855: Nils Frei
- 1856–1856: Johan Ryther
- 1857–1857: Nils Frei
- 1858–1859: Ole Nilsen
- 1860–1872: Jacob Messel Williamsen
- 1873–1875: Eisten H. Storvik
- 1876–1877: Johannes Bugge
- 1878–1883: Eisten H. Storvik
- 1884–1885: Erik Jordal
- 1886–1897: Nils Williamsen (H)
- 1898–1907: Eystein Andreas Nilssen (V)
- 1908–1913: Didrik Frei (V)
- 1914–1916: Nils Williamsen (H)
- 1917–1919: Didrik Frei (V)
- 1920–1922: Jacob Messel Williamsen
- 1923–1931: Anders Grimstad
- 1932–1934: Jacob Messel Williamsen
- 1935–1937: Nils Bjerkestrand
- 1938–1941: Eisten O. Bjerkestrand
- 1942–1944: Peder E. Husby
- 1944–1945: Kristian Williamsen
- 1945–1945: Eisten O. Bjerkestrand
- 1946–1947: Nils Bjerkestrand (KrF)
- 1948–1959: Axel Fiske (KrF)
- 1959–1959: Lars Grimstad (LL)
- 1960–1967: Harald Bergem (KrF)
- 1968–1969: Jakob Knutsen (Ap)
- 1970–1971: Edvin Kvalvik (Ap)
- 1972–1975: Arne Lillevik (V)
- 1976–1979: Torbjørn Nyland
- 1980–1981: Arne Lillevik (V)
- 1982–1983: Erling Bjerkestrand (KrF)
- 1984–1991: Tord M. Kvalvåg (Ap)
- 1992–1999: Anders O. Bergem (LL)
- 1999–2007: Maritta B. Ohrstrand (Sp)

== See also ==
- List of former municipalities of Norway
