= Kvernberg =

Kvernberg is a Norwegian surname. Notable people with the surname include:

- Jorun Marie Kvernberg (born 1979), Norwegian traditional musician and composer
- Ola Kvernberg (born 1981), Norwegian jazz musician

== See also ==
- Kvernberget
