= Rensvik =

Village in Kristiansund Municipality, Norway

- Village
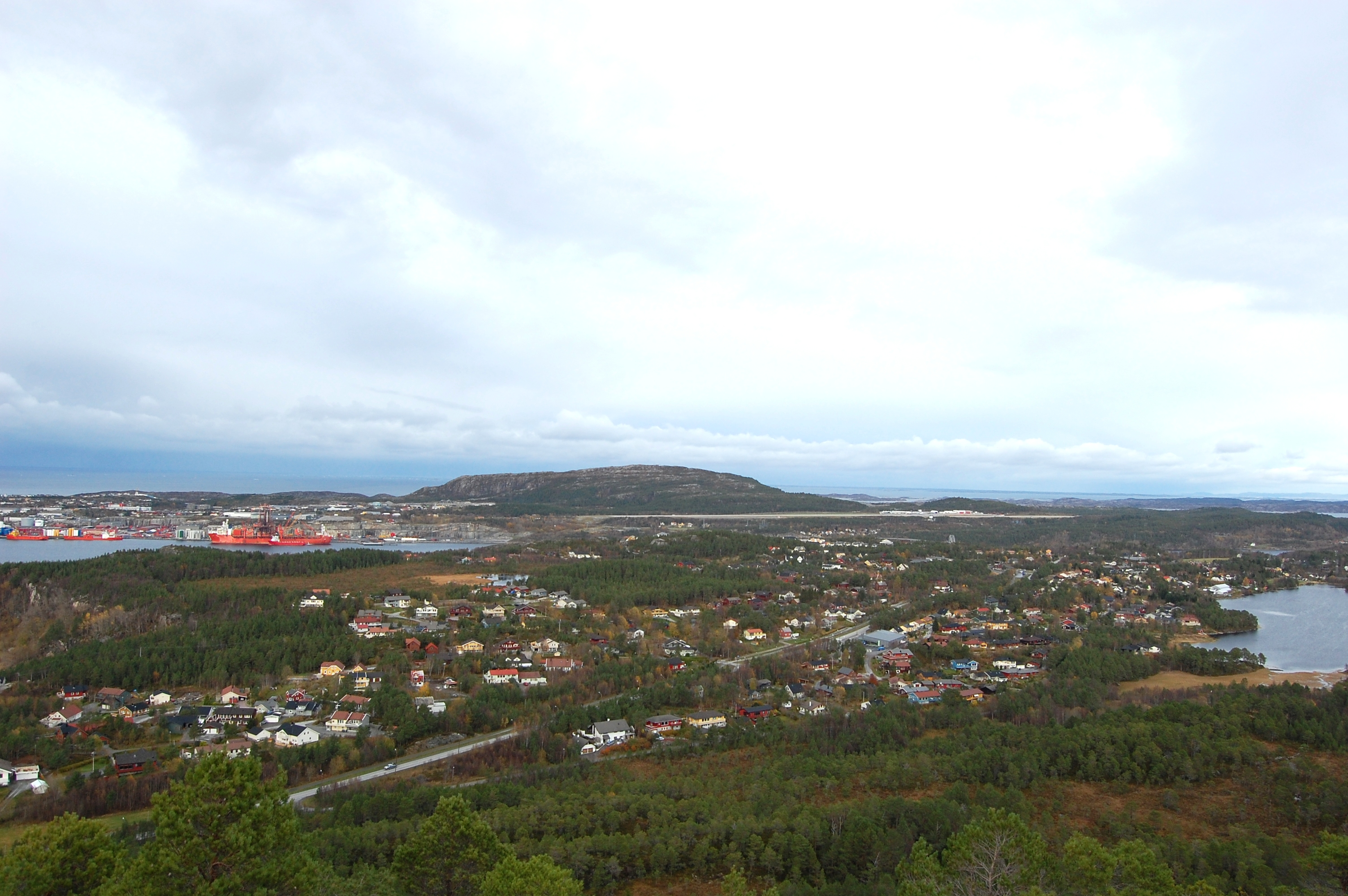
- View of the village

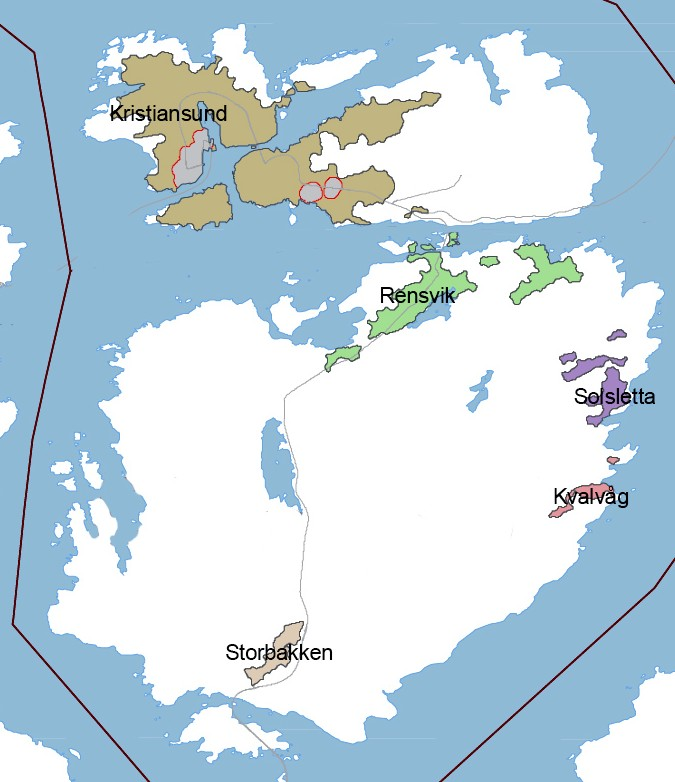
- Location in Kristiansund
- Interactive map of Rensvik
- Coordinates: 63.09843°N 7.82026°E
- Country: Norway
- Region: Western Norway
- County: Møre og Romsdal
- District: Nordmøre
- Municipality: Kristiansund Municipality

Area
  - Total: 1.79 km^{2} (0.69 sq mi)
- Elevation: 20 m (66 ft)

Population (2024)
  - Total: 2,572
  - Density: 1,437/km^{2} (3,720/sq mi)
- Time zone: UTC+01:00 (CET)
  - Summer (DST): UTC+02:00 (CEST)
- Post Code: 6521 Frei

Rensvik is a village in Kristiansund Municipality in Møre og Romsdal county, Norway. The village is located on the northern part of the island of Frei, just west of the Omsund Bridge which connects to the island of Nordlandet to the north. The 1.79-square-kilometre (440-acre) village has a population (2024) of 2,572 and a population density of 1,437 inhabitants per square kilometre (3,720/sq mi).

The village of Rensvik was the administrative center of the old Frei Municipality until 2008 when Frei was incorporated into Kristiansund Municipality. The village of Kvalvåg lies about 5 kilometres (3.1 mi) to the southeast and the village of Nedre Frei is located about 8 kilometres (5.0 mi) to the south.
