= Kristiansund (town) =

Town in Møre og Romsdal, Norway

Kristiansund Christianssund / Fosna
- Town/City
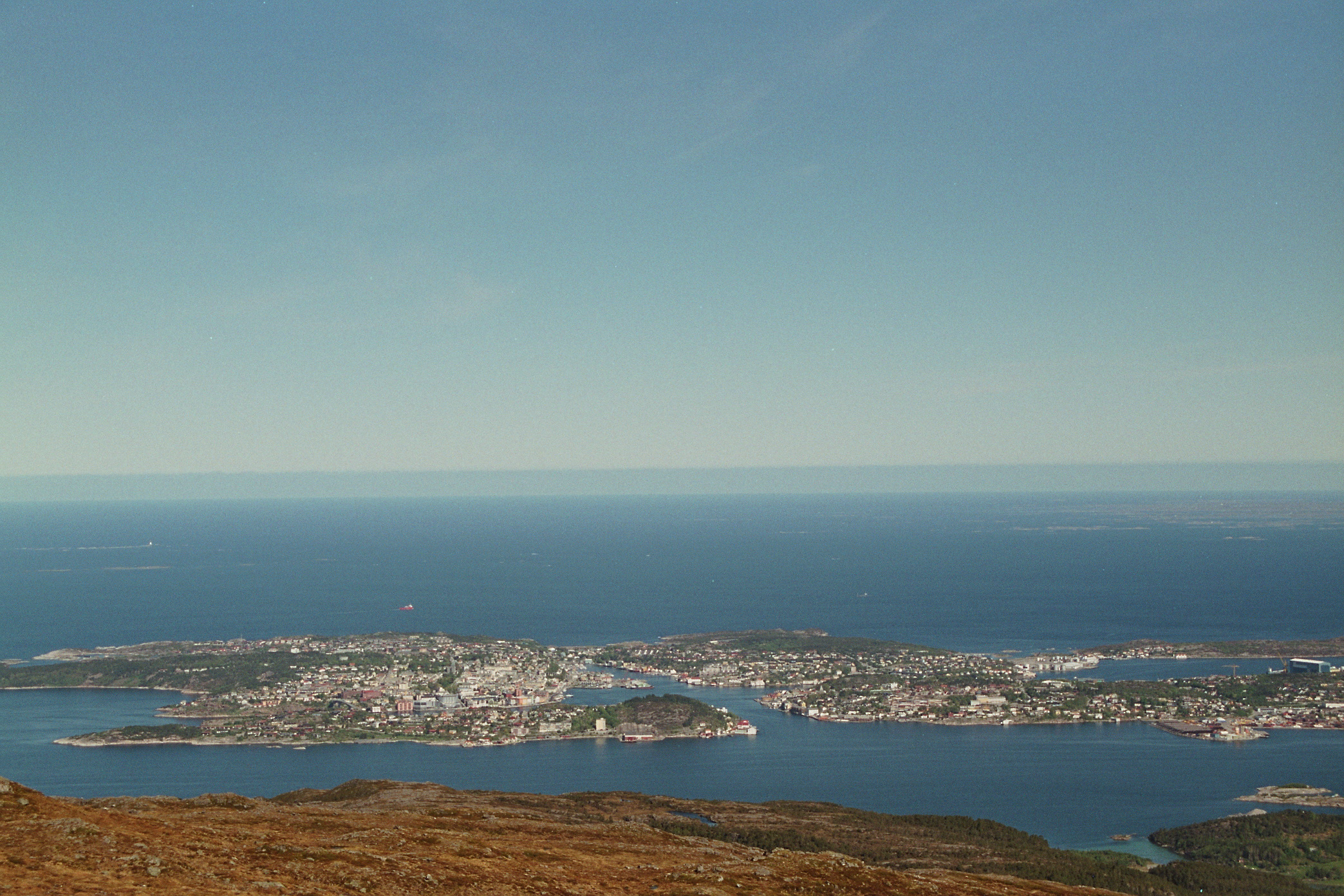
- View of the town
- Interactive map of Kristiansund
- Location within Møre og Romsdal Location within Norway
- Coordinates: 63.1104°N 7.7279°E
- Country: Norway
- Region: Western Norway
- County: Møre og Romsdal
- District: Nordmøre
- Municipality: Kristiansund Municipality
- Established as
- Ladested: 1631
- Kjøpstad: 1742

Area
  - Total: 8.45 km^{2} (3.26 sq mi)
- Elevation: 16 m (52 ft)

Population (2024)
  - Total: 18,337
  - Density: 2,170/km^{2} (5,600/sq mi)
- Demonym(s): Kristiansundar; Kristiansunder
- Time zone: UTC+01:00 (CET)
  - Summer (DST): UTC+02:00 (CEST)
- Post Code: 6500 Kristiansund

Kristiansund (US: /ˈkrɪstʃənsʌnd, ˈkrɪstiənsʊn/, Norwegian: [krɪstjɑnˈsʉnː]; historically spelled Christianssund and earlier named Fosna) is a town in Kristiansund Municipality in Møre og Romsdal county, Norway. The town is the administrative centre of the municipality. The town is located on the islands of Kirklandet, Innlandet, and Nordlandet in the Nordmøre region of the county.

The 8.45-square-kilometre (2,090-acre) town has a population (2024) of 18,337 and a population density of 2,170 inhabitants per square kilometre (5,600/sq mi). Kristiansund is one of the most densely populated cities of Norway, having what is arguably the country's most urban small city centre, due to the relatively small size of the islands on which it is built and the very constricted central harbour/town area of Kirklandet.

== Etymology ==
The town, formerly spelled Christianssund, was named after the Danish-Norwegian King Christian VI in 1742. The last element of the name, sund, means "strait". The old name of the town/village (originally the island Kirklandet) was Fosna or Fosen (Old Norse: fólgsn) which means "hiding place" (here 'hidden port'). It was also often named Lille Fosen ("the small Fosen") to distinguish it from the island Storfosna (lit. 'the big Fosen') in Ørland Municipality to the north.

Before 1877, the name was written Christianssund, from 1877 to 1888 it was spelled Kristianssund, and since 1889 it has had its present spelling, Kristiansund.

Before the introduction of postal codes in Norway in 1968, it was easy to confuse the name Kristiansund with Kristiansand in the south. It was therefore obligatory to always add an N (for north) to Kristiansund (Kristiansund N) and an S (for south) to Kristiansand (Kristiansand S). This is to a large extent still practiced and also occurs in some other contexts than postal addresses.

== History ==
=== 8000 BC–1066 ===
Many scientists believe that the very first Norwegians lived near the area of the present-day town of Kristiansund. At the end of the last Ice age some areas at the western coast of Norway were ice-free. There was also a lot of food in the sea around Kristiansund at that time, and it is believed that the first settlement arrived in Kristiansund around year 8000 BC.

During the Viking ages there were many important battles around Kristiansund. The most famous one was the Battle of Rastarkalv on the island of Frei, where the Norwegian King Håkon the Good fought against the Eirikssønnene group. There is now a memorial monument located near Rastakalv (at Nedre Frei), where the battle was fought.

=== Middle ages ===
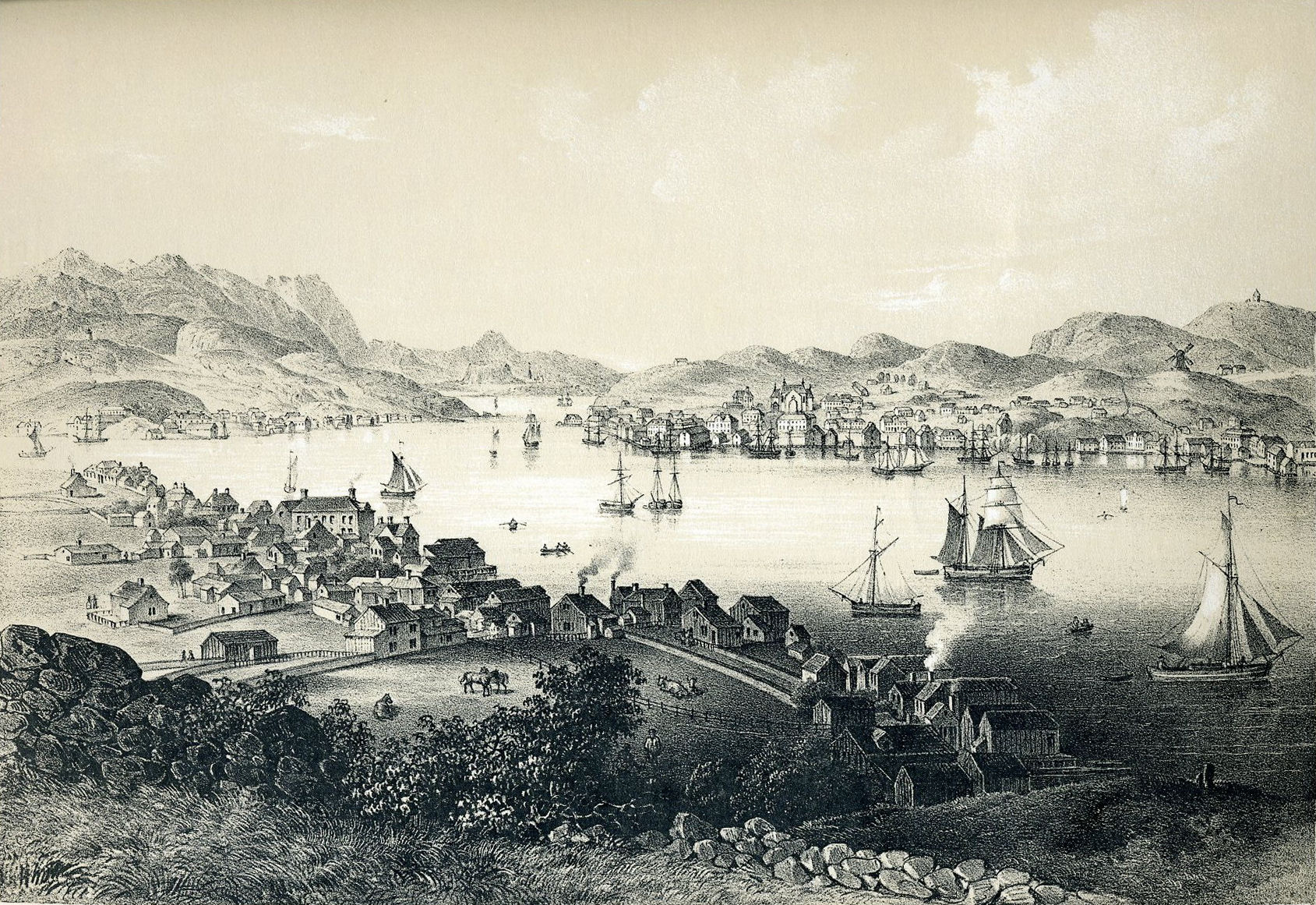
A picture of Christianssund from the early 1840s.

The nearby island of Grip was an important fishing community during the Middle Ages, and was considered to be the most important area in the region at the time. The natural harbour in Lille-Fosen, close to where Kristiansund is located today, was also frequently used for fishing purposes.

=== 17th to 18th century ===
During the 17th century a small settlement developed around the area we know today as Kristiansund harbour. As more and more settlers arrived, the area became an important trading port for fishing and the lumber transportation along the coast. The Dano-Norwegian government established a customs station here, which was controlled by the main trading port in Trondheim. In 1631, the port of Christianssund was declared to be a ladested.

Dutch sailors brought the knowledge of clipfish production to Kristiansund at the end of the 17th century, and for a number of years the town was the largest exporter of clipfish in Norway, exporting goods mainly to the Mediterranean countries as Spain and Portugal. The city's clipfish production was also part of the reason why it was given town status as a kjøpstad in 1742.

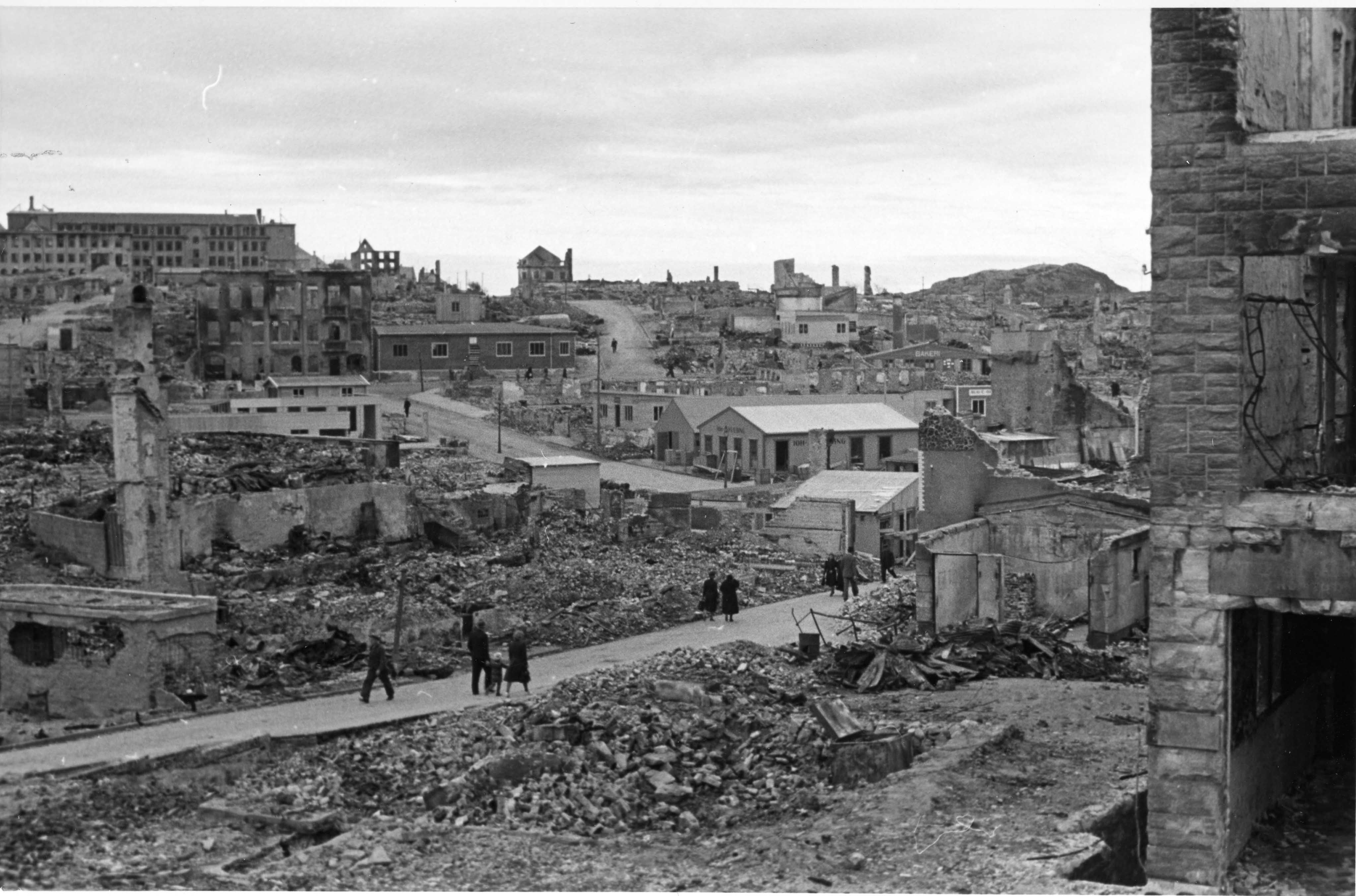
A Picture of Kristansund from 1940 after the bombing.

=== 19th century to present ===
The town of Christianssund was established as Christianssund Municipality on 1 January 1838 (see formannskapsdistrikt law). During World War 2 the town was one of the most heavily bombed cities in Norway, and the German occupation forces taking over the Allanengen school as a headquarters. During the 1960s, there were many municipal mergers across Norway due to the work of the Schei Committee. On 1 January 1964, Kristiansund Municipality was merged with the tiny Grip Municipality (population: 104) to the northwest and the Dale area of Bremsnes Municipality on Nordlandet island (population: 963). The neighboring Frei Municipality was merged with Kristiansund Municipality on 1 January 2008 creating a much larger Kristiansund Municipality.

== Government ==
Kristiansund Municipality is run by a local municipal council and mayor. Prior to the 1960s the municipality and town of Kristiansund were the same, but since the 1960s, the municipality was enlarged to include other rural areas outside the town centre, including the whole island of Frei.

== Media ==
There are two local TV stations in Kristiansund. The larger one is TVNordvest, (TV North-West) which broadcasts local news from the area around Kristiansund on a daily basis, as well as some other TV shows. The second one is TV Kristiansund, which is more of a culture channel, broadcasting cultural news from Kristiansund, like shows from the city Opera.

The local newspaper of Kristiansund is Tidens Krav, which also functions as a local newspaper for the other municipalities located nearby the city.

== Climate ==
Kristiansund has a temperate oceanic climate (Cfb) with cool-to-warm summers and mild winters. The city structure with the unique natural harbour of the city combined with Atlantic air from the southwest and the Gulf Stream gives Kristiansund a much warmer climate than its latitude would indicate. The all-time high 32 °C (90 °F) was set 28 July 2018. The warmest month on record at Kristiansund Airport was July 2014 with mean 17.1 °C (62.8 °F) and average daily high 21.9 °C (71.4 °F). The all-time low −14.3 °C (6.3 °F) was recorded 23 February 2010. The coldest month on record at Kristiansund Airport was December 2010 with mean −2.7 °C (27.1 °F) and average daily low −4.9 °C (23.2 °F). The coldest month recorded at earlier weather stations in Kristiansund was February 1947 with mean −3.6 °C (25.5 °F) (recordings since 1871).

Climate data for Kristiansund Airport 1991-2020 (62 m, precipitation from Karihola, extremes 2002-2025)
Month	Jan	Feb	Mar	Apr	May	Jun	Jul	Aug	Sep	Oct	Nov	Dec	Year
Record high °C (°F)	15.7 (60.3)	15.4 (59.7)	15.7 (60.3)	22.8 (73.0)	28.6 (83.5)	29.9 (85.8)	32 (90)	28.7 (83.7)	24.7 (76.5)	24.3 (75.7)	17.6 (63.7)	14.7 (58.5)	32 (90)
Mean daily maximum °C (°F)	4 (39)	4 (39)	6 (43)	9 (48)	12 (54)	15 (59)	18 (64)	18 (64)	15 (59)	11 (52)	7 (45)	4 (39)	10 (50)
Daily mean °C (°F)	2.1 (35.8)	1.6 (34.9)	2.8 (37.0)	5.6 (42.1)	8.5 (47.3)	11.4 (52.5)	14.3 (57.7)	14.2 (57.6)	11.5 (52.7)	7.2 (45.0)	4.6 (40.3)	2.3 (36.1)	7.2 (44.9)
Mean daily minimum °C (°F)	0 (32)	0 (32)	1 (34)	3 (37)	6 (43)	9 (48)	12 (54)	12 (54)	9 (48)	6 (43)	3 (37)	1 (34)	5 (41)
Record low °C (°F)	−11.4 (11.5)	−14.3 (6.3)	−10.2 (13.6)	−3.7 (25.3)	−2.5 (27.5)	1.3 (34.3)	5.6 (42.1)	3.5 (38.3)	2.2 (36.0)	−4.9 (23.2)	−8.5 (16.7)	−10.5 (13.1)	−14.3 (6.3)
Average precipitation mm (inches)	93 (3.7)	95 (3.7)	85 (3.3)	58 (2.3)	49 (1.9)	63 (2.5)	71 (2.8)	93 (3.7)	122 (4.8)	96 (3.8)	94 (3.7)	103 (4.1)	1,022 (40.3)
Source 1: Norwegian Meteorological Institute
Source 2: Weatheronline.co.uk

== Parks and gardens ==
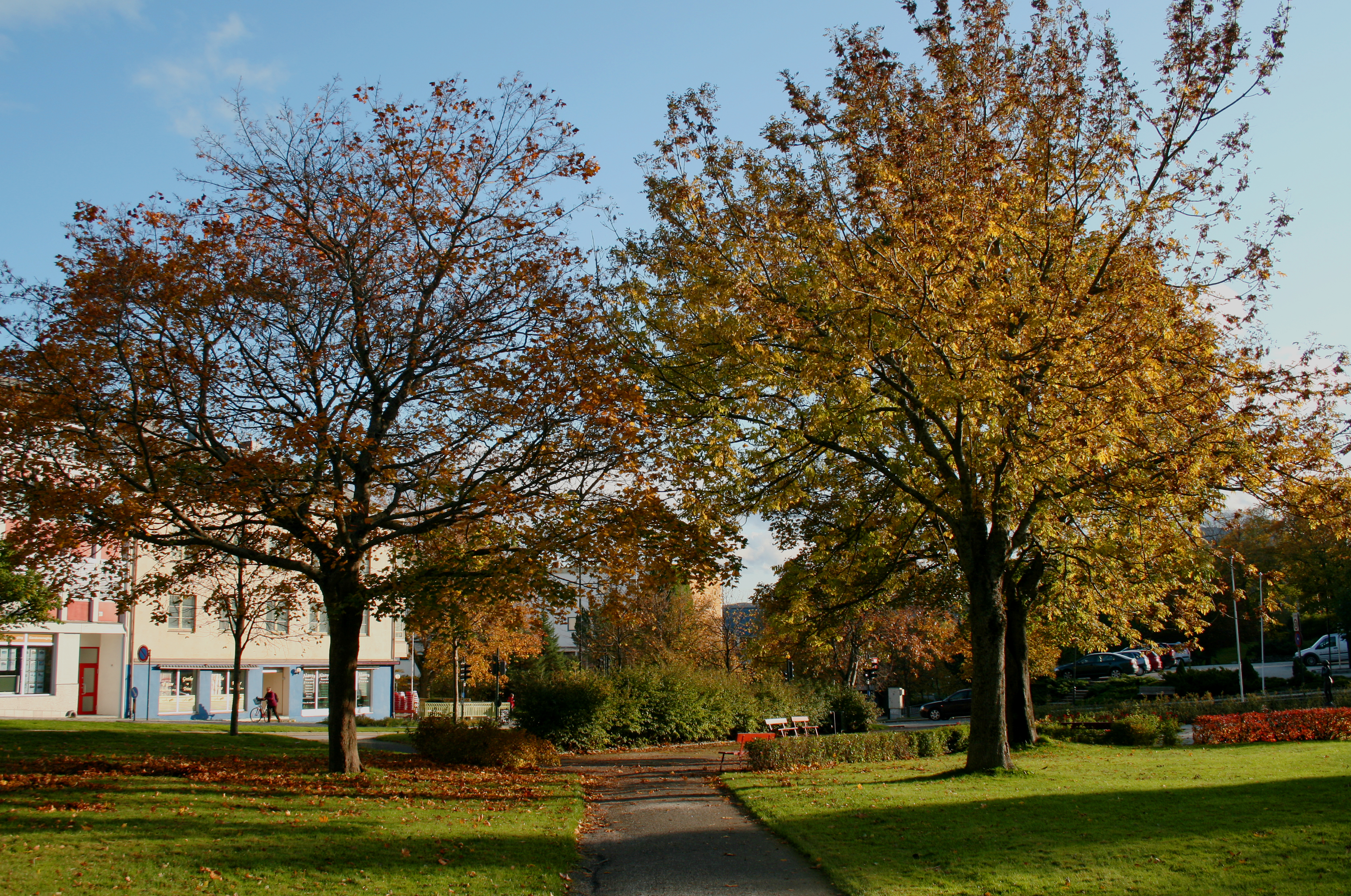
A small section of the Langveien-park.

Though fairly small in size, the town of Kristiansund contains many green parks and gardens, frequently used by the local inhabitants. There are two larger parks near the city centre. The first one is located near Langveien, and was constructed in the aftermath of World War II . The second one is located in Vanndamman. This area used to be part of the city water supply, due to the large amount of small lakes in the area (hence the name "Vanndamman" (The Water ponds)). The two parks are partly linked together, but the Langveien park serves more as an urban recreation area due to the short walking distance from the city centre, while the Vanndamman park is more suitable for outings and jogging.

== Transport ==
Started in 1876 and still going strong is the Sundbåt ("Strait Boat"/"Strait Crossing Boat") shuttle service with a capacity of a few tens of passengers, traveling between the islands that make up the town. The small motor ferry crosses the harbour from Kirklandet to Innlandet, then goes on to Nordlandet, to Gomalandet, and back to Kirkelandet, repeating the round trip in half-hour intervals morning to evening on weekdays. The Sundbåt bears the distinction of being the world's oldest motorized regular public transport system in continuous service.

The road to Kristiansund from the mainland, Norwegian National Road 70 (Rv70) is connected to European route E39 by the bridge/tunnel system called Krifast. After passing through the underwater Freifjord Tunnel from the central part of Krifast, National Road 70 crosses Frei, and enters Kristiansund over the Omsund Bridge onto Nordlandet. The Nordsund Bridge brings the Rv70 to Gomalandet and its terminus in downtown at Kirklandet. Another high bridge, the Sørsund Bridge, leads from Kirkelandet to Innlandet. E39 leads southwest to the town of Molde and northeast via the European route E6 to Trøndelag and the city of Trondheim.

There used to be a car ferry going from Kirkelandet island to neighboring Averøy Municipality to the west, whose people have been commuting to town for many years for work as well as selling agricultural products. The ferry to Averøy connected Kristiansund to Norwegian National Road 64, which continued along the scenic Atlantic Ocean Road to Molde. The ferry was replaced by the 5.7-kilometre (3.5 mi) long underwater Atlantic Ocean Tunnel in December 2009. Because both tunnels are forbidden for bicyclists, Kristiansund cannot easily be reached by bicycle.

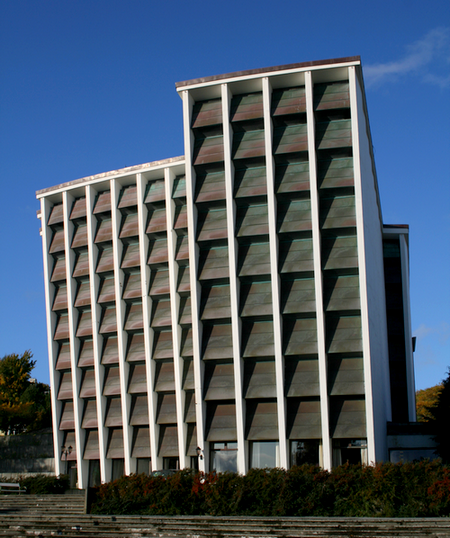
The front façade of Kirkelandet Church. It was one of the first truly modern church buildings in Norway, constructed in the mid-1960s.

A second car ferry goes from Seivika on Nordlandet to the nearby island of Tustna in the northeast as part of County Road 680, with further road and ferry connections to the islands of Smøla and Hitra, and to Aure Municipality on the mainland.

Besides roads and car ferries and Kristiansund Airport, Kvernberget, connections to/from Kristiansund consist of the traditional coastal express Hurtigruten boats which connect the coastal towns from Bergen in the south to Kirkenes in the north, as well as the high speed catamaran passenger service Kystekspressen to Trondheim. Another option to get to Kristiansund is to fly with Scandinavian Airlines from several other Norwegian cities.

== Commerce and industry ==
Kristiansund is known as the major bacalhau city of Norway. Bacalhau is made of salted, dried codfish, and has traditionally been exported in large amounts to Spain, Portugal, and Latin America as food suitable during Lent. In recent years Kristiansund has become the major oil and gas city at the mid-northwestern coast. Oil companies like Royal Dutch Shell and Statoil have offices in Kristiansund from where they serve their offshore installations at Haltenbanken (one of the northernmost underwater oil fields in the world).

Due to the city's heavy involvement in fish processing and international shipping, there used to be as many as seven consulates in Kristiansund, mainly to Latin countries. Currently, there are only five left: Britain, Finland, Latvia, the Netherlands, and Portugal.

== See also ==
- List of towns and cities in Norway
