= Kvalvåg =

Village in Kristiansund Municipality, Norway

- Village
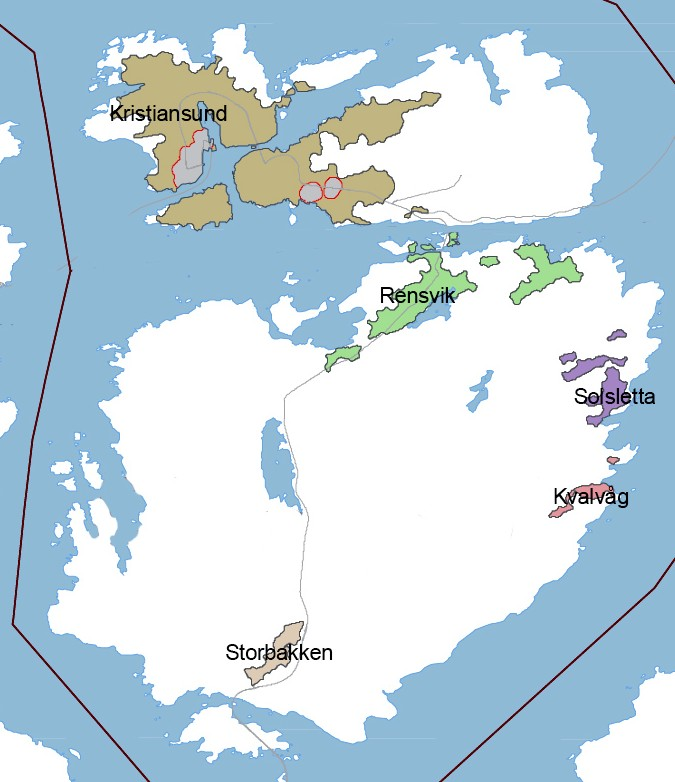
- Location in Kristiansund municipality
- Interactive map of Kvalvåg
- Coordinates: 63°04′12″N 07°52′51″E
- Country: Norway
- Region: Western Norway
- County: Møre og Romsdal
- District: Nordmøre
- Municipality: Kristiansund Municipality

Area
  - Total: 0.21 km^{2} (0.081 sq mi)
- Elevation: 24 m (79 ft)

Population (2012)
  - Total: 240
  - Density: 1,143/km^{2} (2,960/sq mi)
- Time zone: UTC+01:00 (CET)
  - Summer (DST): UTC+02:00 (CEST)
- Post Code: 6523 Frei

Kvalvåg is a village in Kristiansund Municipality in Møre og Romsdal county, Norway. The village lies on the southeast side of the island of Frei, along the Freifjorden, about 10 kilometres (6.2 mi) southeast of the town of Kristiansund. The villages of Nedre Frei and Storbakken lie about 7 kilometres (4.3 mi) to the southwest and the village of Rensvik lies about 5 kilometres (3.1 mi) to the northwest.

The 0.21-square-kilometre (52-acre) village had a population (2012) of 240 and a population density of 1,143 inhabitants per square kilometre (2,960/sq mi). Since 2012, the population and area data for this village area has not been separately tracked by Statistics Norway.
