= Sørsund Bridge =

Sørsund Bridge Sørsundbrua
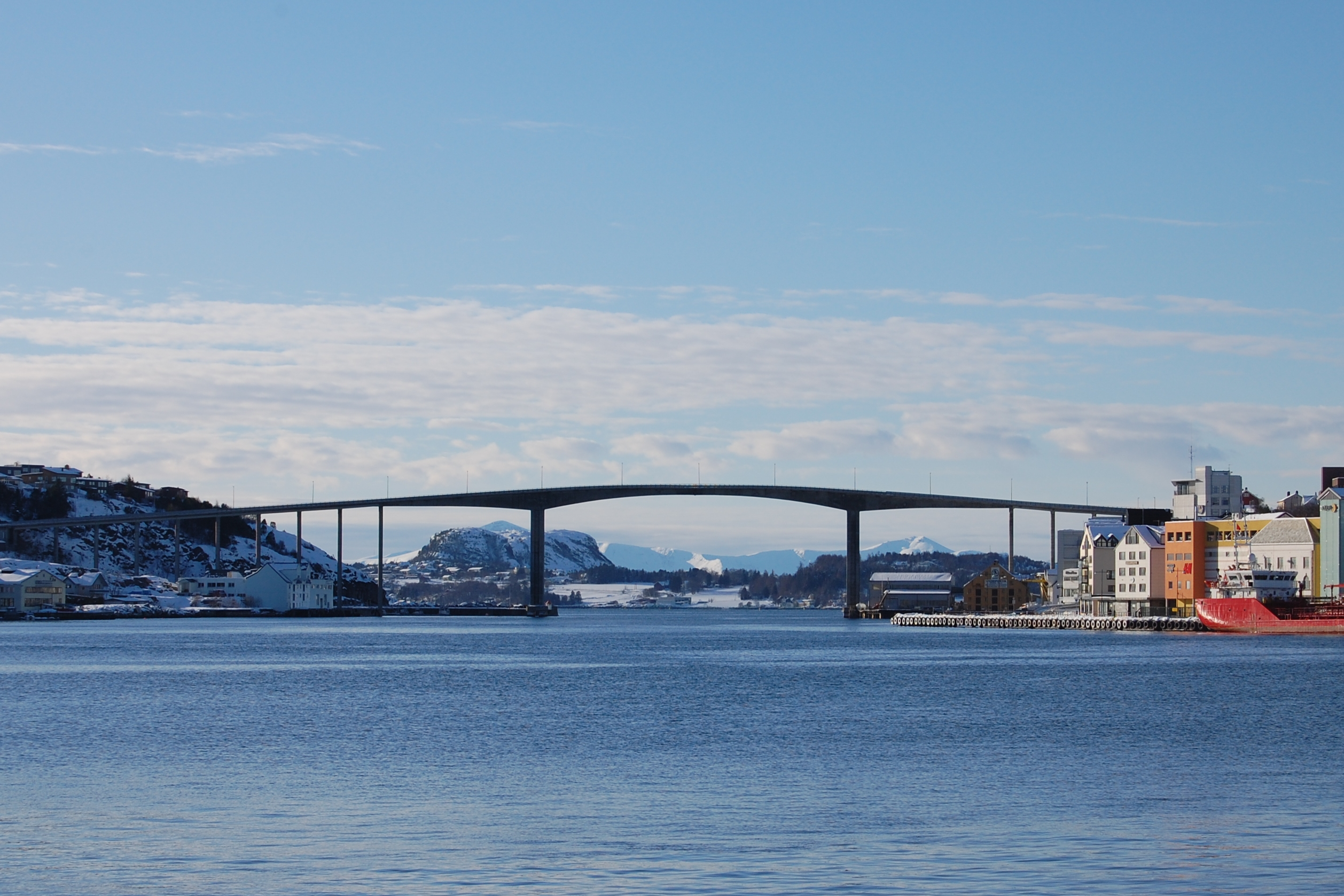
- View of the bridge
- Coordinates: 63.1078°N 7.7244°E
- Carries: Fv420
- Crosses: Sørsundet
- Locale: Kristiansund, Norway

Characteristics
- Design: Cantilever bridge
- Material: Concrete
- Total length: 408 metres (1,339 ft)
- Longest span: 100 metres (330 ft)
- No. of spans: 19
- Clearance below: 38 metres (125 ft)

History
- Opened: 1963

The Sørsund Bridge (Norwegian: Sørsundbrua) is a bridge that crosses the Sørsundet strait between the islands of Kirkelandet and Innlandet in the town of Kristiansund which is in Kristiansund Municipality, Møre og Romsdal county, Norway. The 408-metre-long (1,339 ft) bridge has 19 spans, with a main span of 100 metres (330 ft). The bridge opened in 1963 and it carries County Road 420.

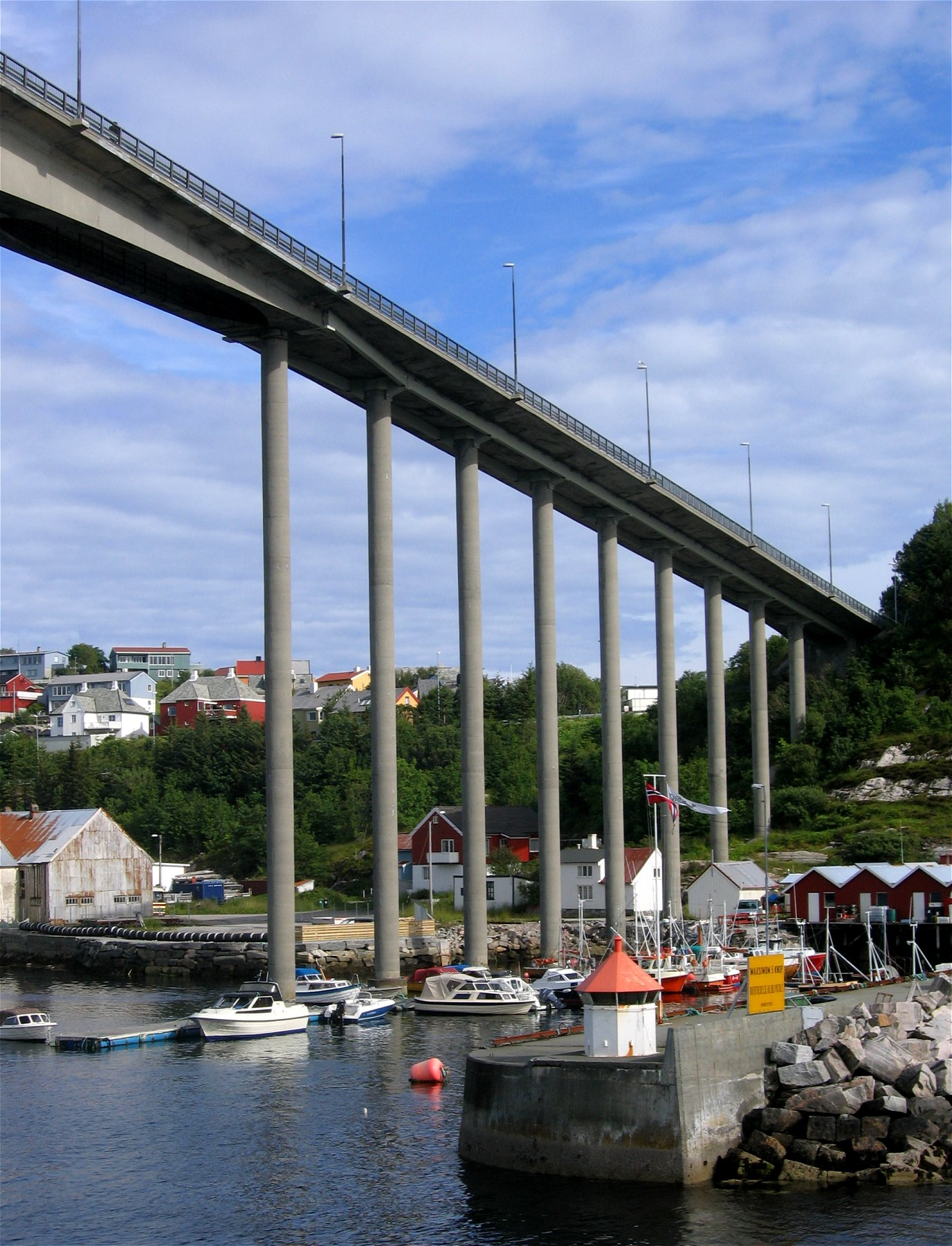
View of the bridge

== See also ==
- List of bridges in Norway
- List of bridges in Norway by length
- List of bridges
- List of bridges by length
- Nordsund Bridge
