= Kirklandet =

Island in Kristiansund, Norway

Kirklandet Gomalandet
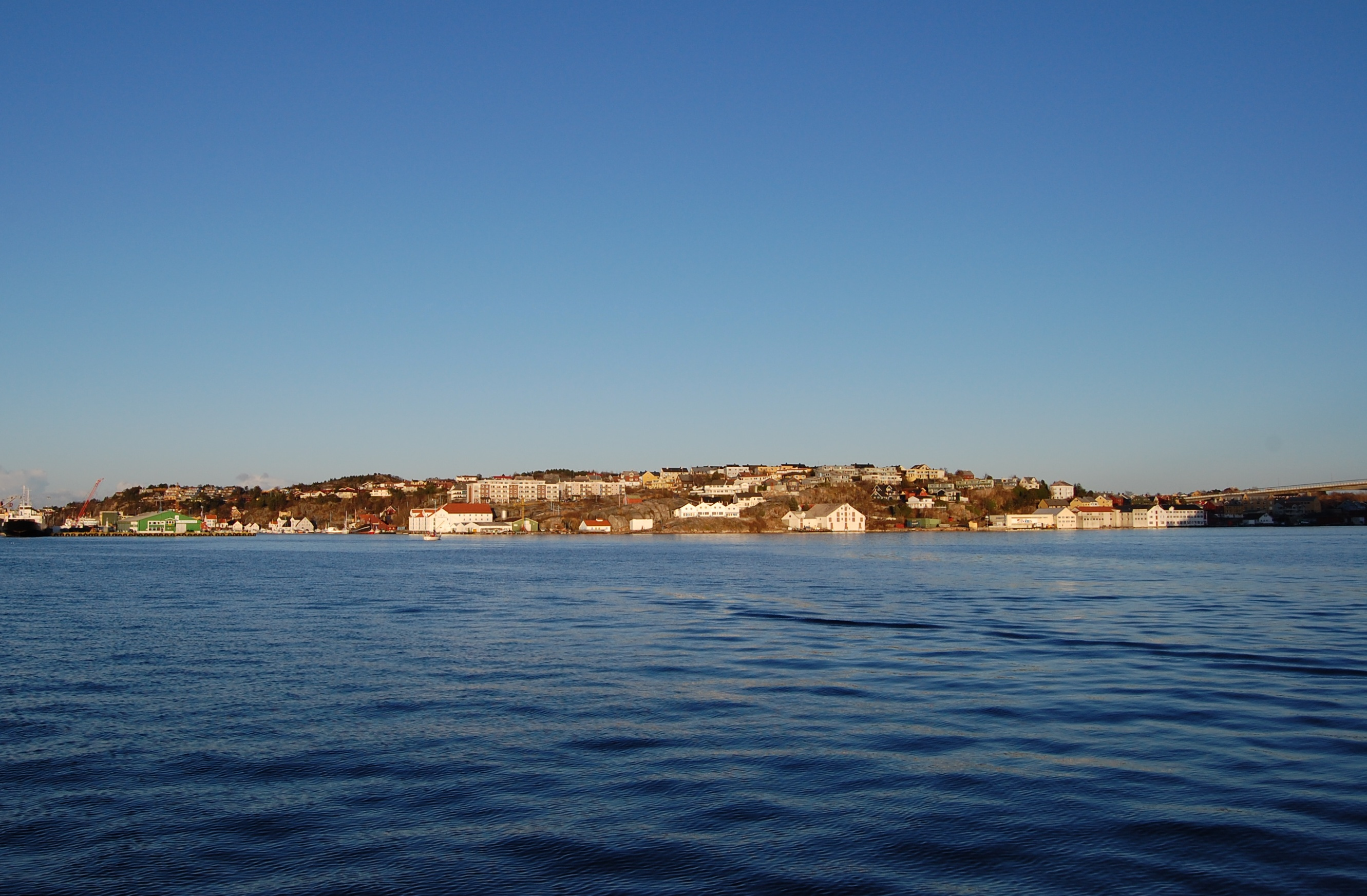
- View of the Gomalandet part of the island
- Interactive map of Kirklandet; Gomalandet

Geography
- Location: Nordmøre, Norway
- Coordinates: 63.1244°N 7.7413°E
- Area: 5.94 km^{2} (2.29 sq mi)
- Length: 2.9 km (1.8 mi)
- Width: 3.8 km (2.36 mi)
- Highest elevation: 78 m (256 ft)
- Highest point: Varden

Administration
- Norway
- County: Møre og Romsdal
- Municipality: Kristiansund

Kirklandet or Gomalandet is an island in Kristiansund Municipality in Møre og Romsdal county, Norway. The island is split in two by the Vågen inlet, with the western half called Kirklandet and the eastern half called Gomalandet. The name of the island means "church land", since it has been the historic site of a church. Today, Kirkelandet Church is located on the western part of the island.

This is the main island of the city of Kristiansund, with the island of Innlandet to the southwest, the island of Nordlandet to the southeast, and the island of Skorpa to the east. The main highway on the island is Norwegian National Road 70. The Sørsund Bridge connects the island to Innlandet and the Nordsund Bridge connects it to the island of Nordlandet. The Atlantic Ocean Tunnel connects it to the island of Averøya to the west.

== See also ==
- List of islands of Norway
