= Nordlandet =

Island in Kristiansund, Norway

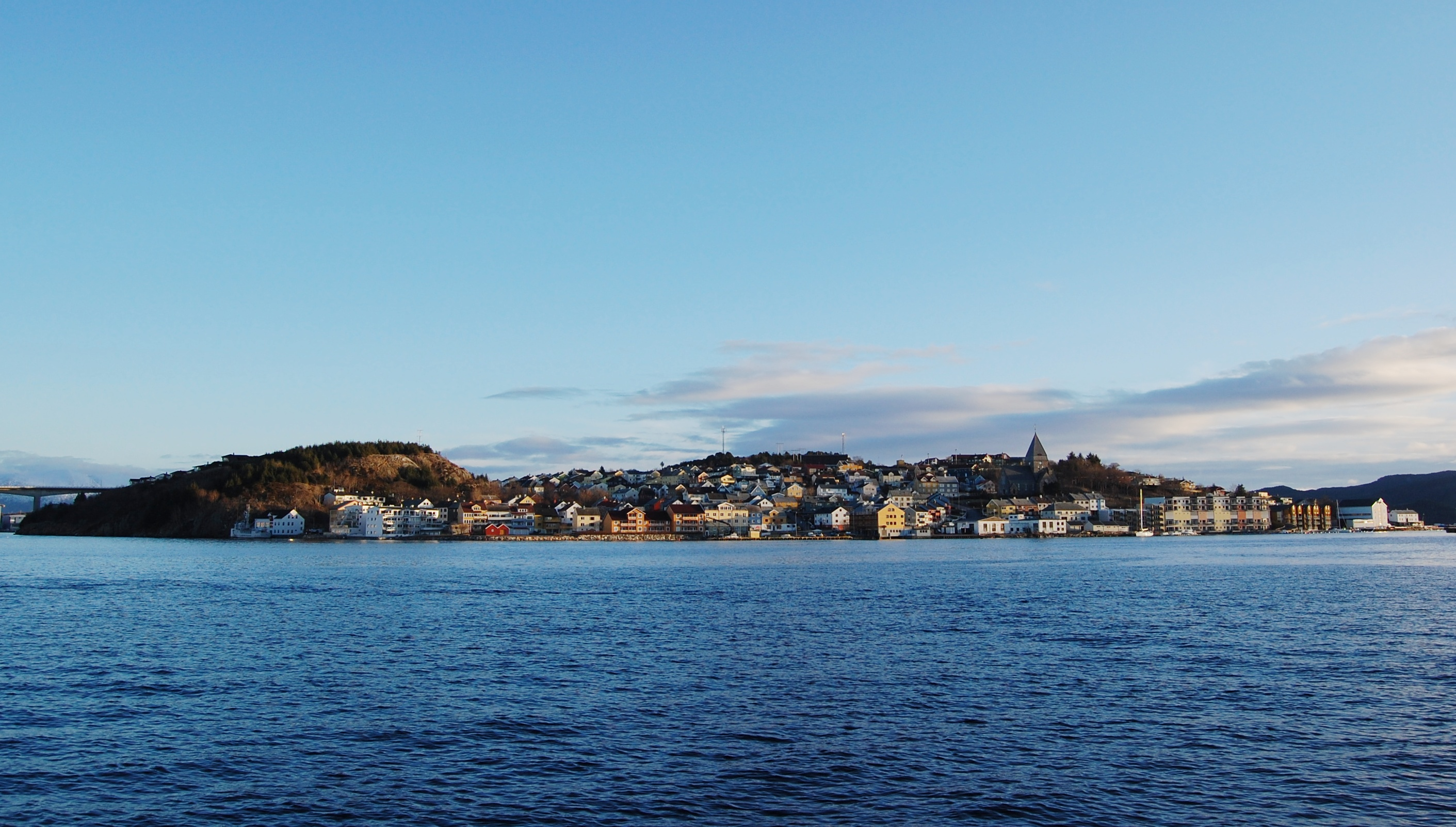
- View of Nordlandet island
- Interactive map of Nordlandet

Geography
- Location: Kristiansund, Norway
- Coordinates: 63.1233°N 7.8212°E
- Archipelago: 14.3
- Length: 6.3 km (3.91 mi)
- Width: 3.3 km (2.05 mi)
- Highest elevation: 205 m (673 ft)
- Highest point: Kvernberget

Administration
- Norway
- County: Møre og Romsdal
- Municipality: Kristiansund

Nordlandet is an island in Kristiansund Municipality in Møre og Romsdal county, Norway. The 14.3-square-kilometre (5.5 sq mi) island is located just east of the city center of Kristiansund, and is one of the boroughs of the city. The island is home to Kristiansund Airport, Kvernberget, which is named after the nearby 205-metre (673 ft) tall mountain Kvernberget. This is the largest of the islands that make up the city of Kristiansund (the others being Kirkelandet, Innlandet, and Skorpa).

Norwegian National Road 70 connects the island to the city of Kristiansund and south to the mainland. In the northwestern part of the island the Nordsund Bridge connects it to the island of Kirkelandet, and in the southwestern part of the island the Omsund Bridge connects it to the island of Frei.

== See also ==
- List of islands of Norway
