= Battle of Rastarkalv =

Coordinates: 63°03′45″N 07°48′11″E

- Part of War between King Haakon the Good and the sons of Eirik Bloodaxe.
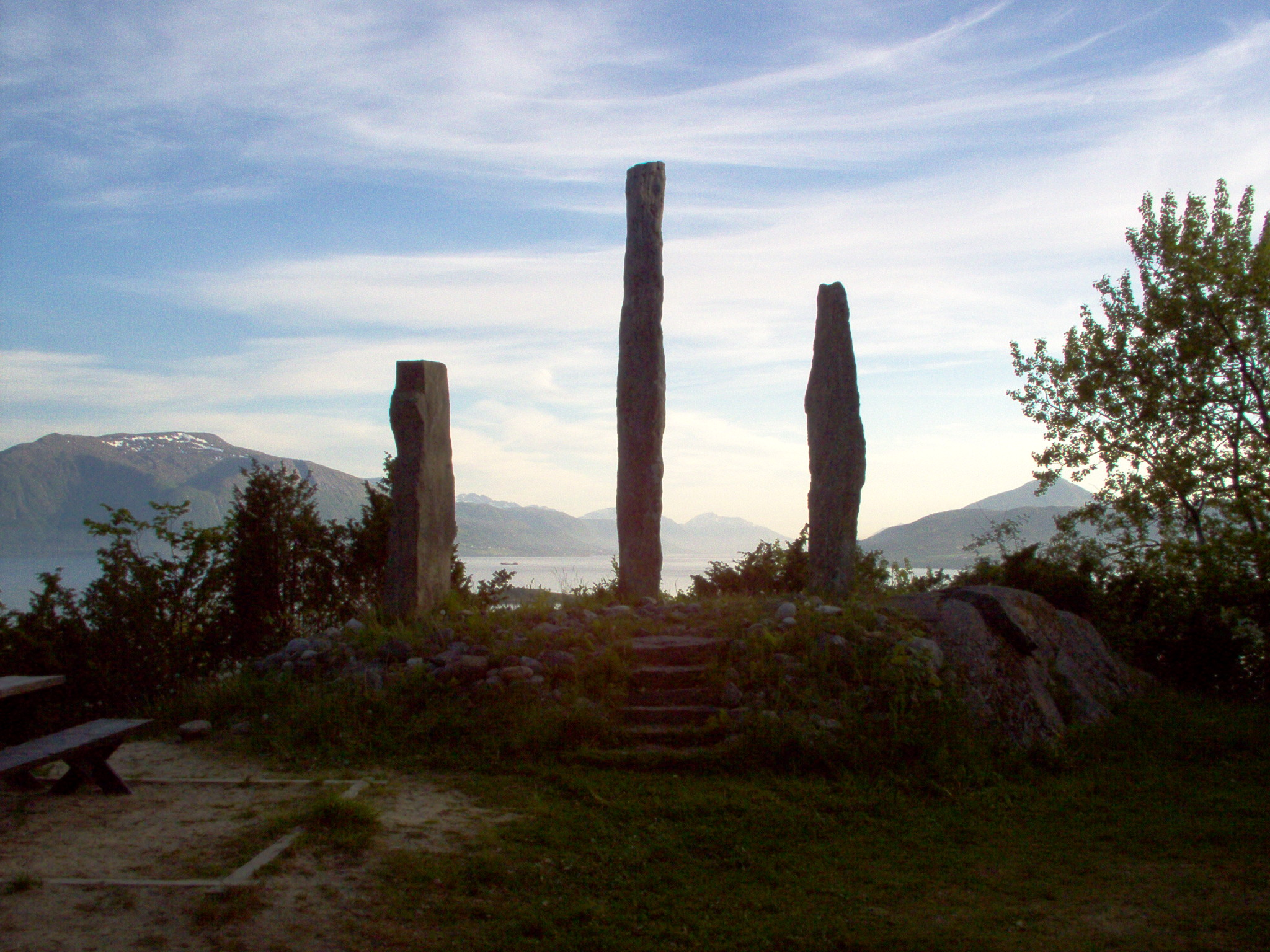
- Obelisk Memorial for Egil Ullserk and his men who died at the Battle of Rastarkalv
Date	955
Location	Frei Island
Result	Norwegian victory

Belligerents
Norway	Sons of Eirik Bloodaxe; Supported by: Denmark

Commanders and leaders
King Haakon the Good; Egil Ullserk †	Gamle Eirikssen †

Strength
Unknown	Unknown

Casualties and losses
Unknown	High

The Battle of Rastarkalv (Norwegian: Slaget på Rastarkalv) took place in 955 on the southern part of the island of Frei in the present-day Kristiansund Municipality in Møre og Romsdal county, Norway.

This was one of several battles between the forces of King Haakon the Good and those of the sons of Eirik Bloodaxe (Eiriksønnene). After their father's death, Harald Greycloak and his brothers were allied against King Haakon with King Harald Bluetooth of Denmark. Haakon had put up a warning system with cairns that would be lighted to tell of approaching war fleets. Therefore, the king was alarmed first with messengers at Nordmøre from Stadlandet. Haakon managed to fool Eirik's sons into believing they were outnumbered. The Danes fled but when they came to the beach, they discovered that their ships had been pushed out to sea. Haakon gained the victory and the Danish forces were slaughtered by Haakon's army.

Egil Ullserk, who was Haakon's leading man, died in the battle. Gamle Eirikssen, one of the sons of Eirik Bloodaxe, also died in the conflict. Haakon buried Egil Ullserk in a ship together with the people who had died in the battle. In 1955 (on the 1000 year anniversary), King Haakon VII visited the area and commemorated the battle. There is a stone monument located near Frei Church in Nedre Frei. It consists of an Obelisk Memorial for Egil Ullserk and his men who died at the Battle of Rastarkalv.
