= Frei Church =

Church in Møre og Romsdal, Norway

- Frei kirke
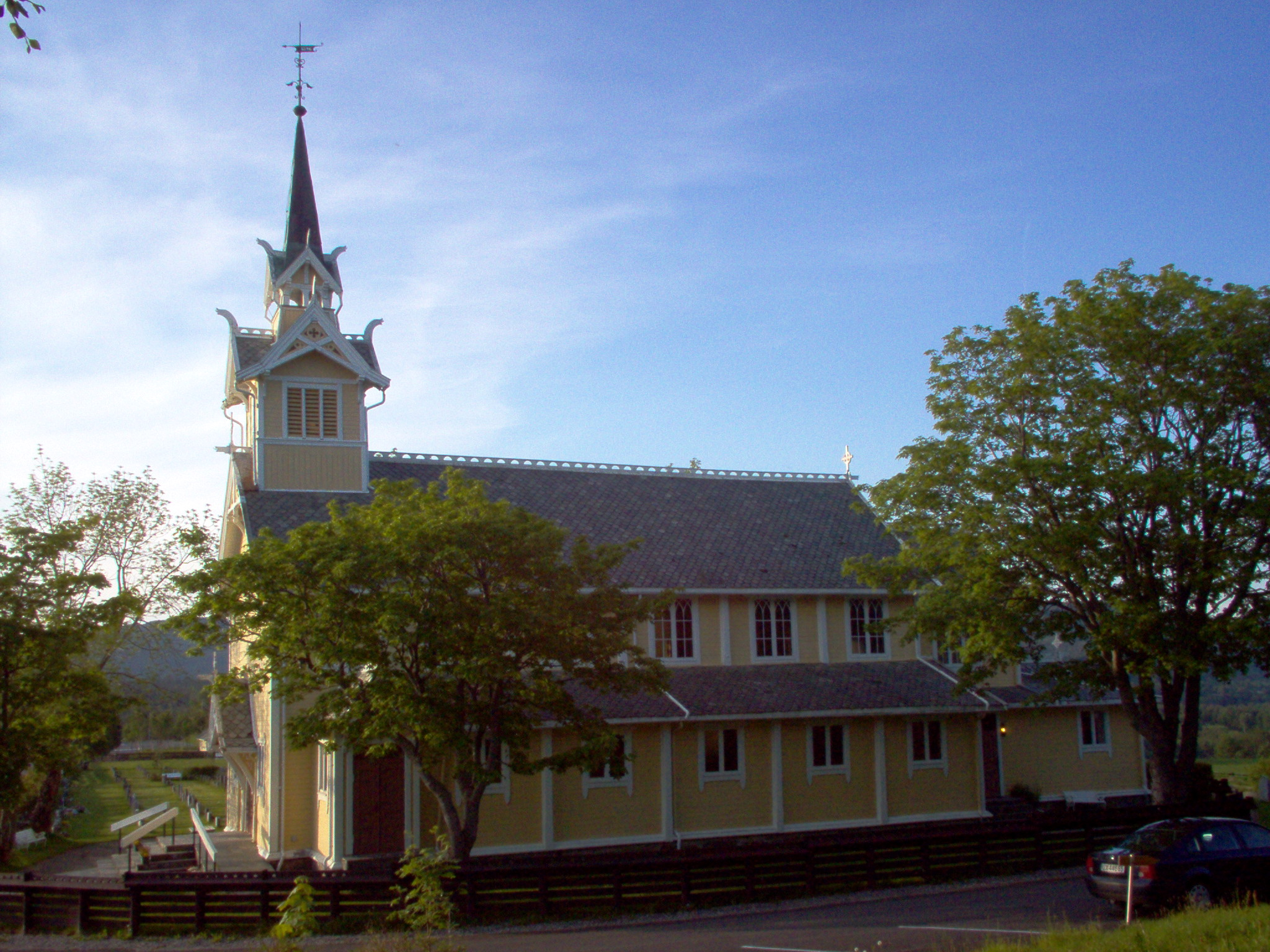
- View of the church
- Frei Church
- 63°01′28″N 7°48′11″E
- Location: Kristiansund Municipality, Møre og Romsdal
- Country: Norway
- Denomination: Church of Norway
- Churchmanship: Evangelical Lutheran

History
- Status: Parish church
- Founded: 14th century
- Consecrated: 16 Sept 1897

Architecture
- Functional status: Active
- Architect: Karl Norum
- Architectural type: Long church
- Style: Dragestil
- Completed: 1897 (129 years ago)

Specifications
- Capacity: 420
- Materials: Wood

Administration
- Diocese: Møre bispedømme
- Deanery: Ytre Nordmøre prosti
- Parish: Frei
- Norwegian Cultural Heritage Site
- Type: Church
- Status: Listed
- ID: 84195

Frei Church (Norwegian: Frei kirke) is a parish church of the Church of Norway in Kristiansund Municipality in Møre og Romsdal county, Norway. It is located in the village of Nedre Frei on the southern shore of the island of Frei. It is the church for the Frei parish which is part of the Ytre Nordmøre prosti (deanery) in the Diocese of Møre. The yellow, wooden church was built in a long church style in 1897 by the architect Karl Norum. The church seats about 420 people.

== History ==
The earliest existing historical records of the church date back to 1432, but the church was not new that year. The first church in Frei was a wooden stave church that was located about 40 metres (130 ft) southeast of the present church site. It may have been founded during the 14th century. The church was a long church design with a sacristy on the east end and a church porch on the north side where the main entrance was located. The building was renovated in 1665. During the renovation, a tower was built on the roof above the nave. Prior to 1665, there was a small free-standing bell tower. In October 1766, the church was struck by lightning and it burned down. A new church site was chosen about 40 metres (130 ft) to the northwest of the old church site. The church was rebuilt on this new site the following spring of 1767. The new church was a timber-framed cruciform design with a sacristy on the east end.

In the spring of 1896, the church was torn down. A new church was built from 1896 to 1897 on the same site. Some of the materials of the old church were preserved and re-used in the construction of the present church building. The church was designed by Karl Norum. The new building was consecrated on 16 September 1897. It is a wooden, dragestil long church with a tower on the west end and a choir on the east end that was flanked by a sacristy on the north and south side of the choir.

== See also ==
- List of churches in Møre
