= Innlandet (island) =

Island in Kristiansund, Norway

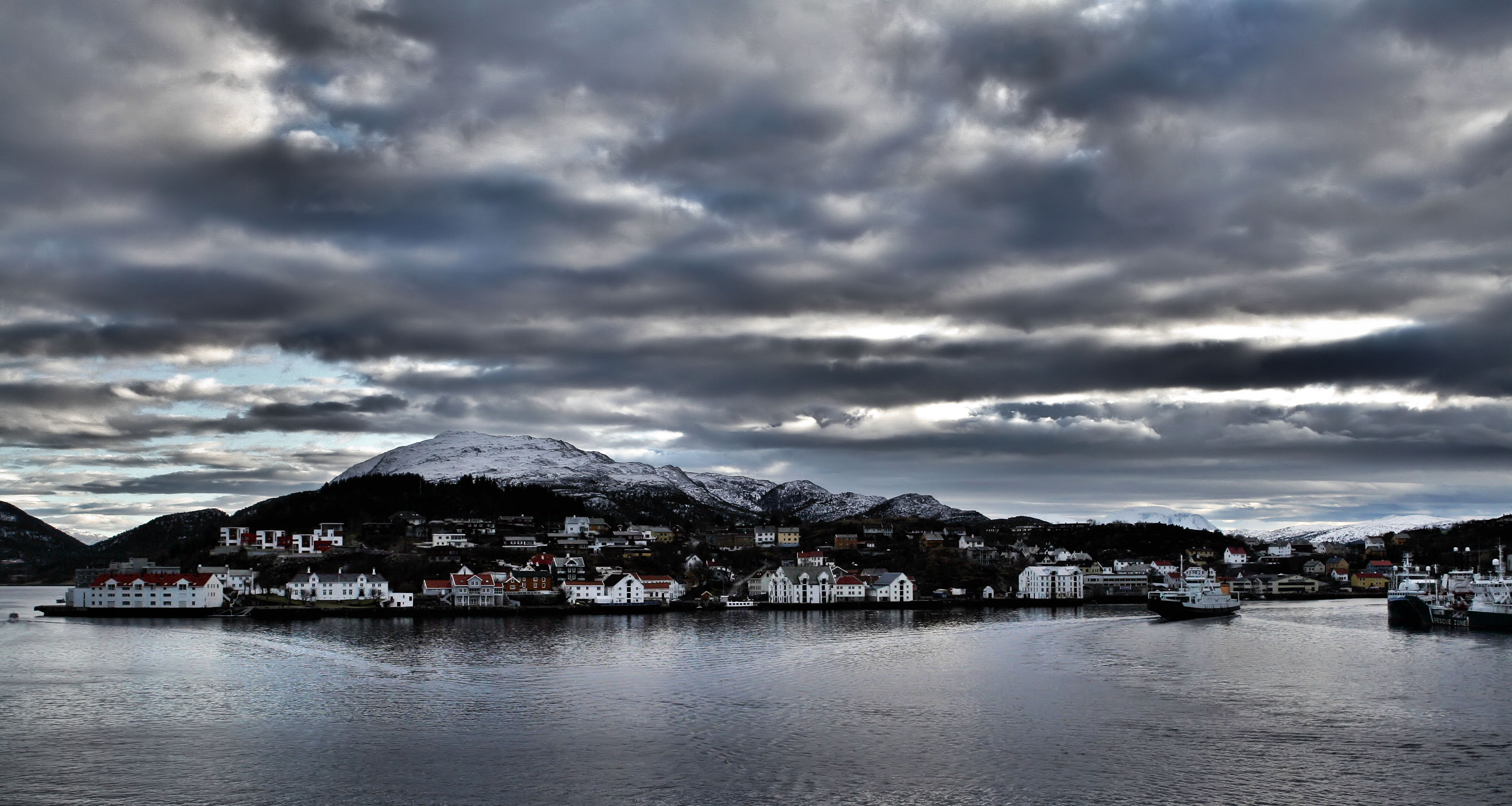
- View of the island
- Interactive map of Innlandet

Geography
- Location: Møre og Romsdal, Norway
- Coordinates: 63.1044°N 7.7348°E
- Area: 73 ha (180 acres)
- Length: 1.5 km (0.93 mi)
- Width: 700 m (2300 ft)
- Coastline: 4.8 km (2.98 mi)
- Highest elevation: 64 m (210 ft)
- Highest point: Bautaen

Administration
- Norway
- County: Møre og Romsdal
- Municipality: Kristiansund

Innlandet is an island in Kristiansund Municipality in Møre og Romsdal county, Norway. The island is the smallest of the four main islands of the town of Kristiansund (the others are Kirkelandet, Gomalandet, and Nordlandet). The island is connected to the island of Kirkelandet (to the north) by the Sørsund Bridge. The 73-hectare (180-acre) island sits east of the Bremsnesfjorden and west of the island of Nordlandet. Most of the island is urban, except for the 64-metre (210 ft) tall hill on the eastern end of the island which is forested.

The island was barely affected by the bombings during World War II, so the island is full of the characteristic old wooden buildings that were prevalent in the 1800s and early 1900s.

== See also ==
- List of islands of Norway
