= Kristiansund Airport, Kvernberget =

Kristiansund Airport Kristiansund lufthavn

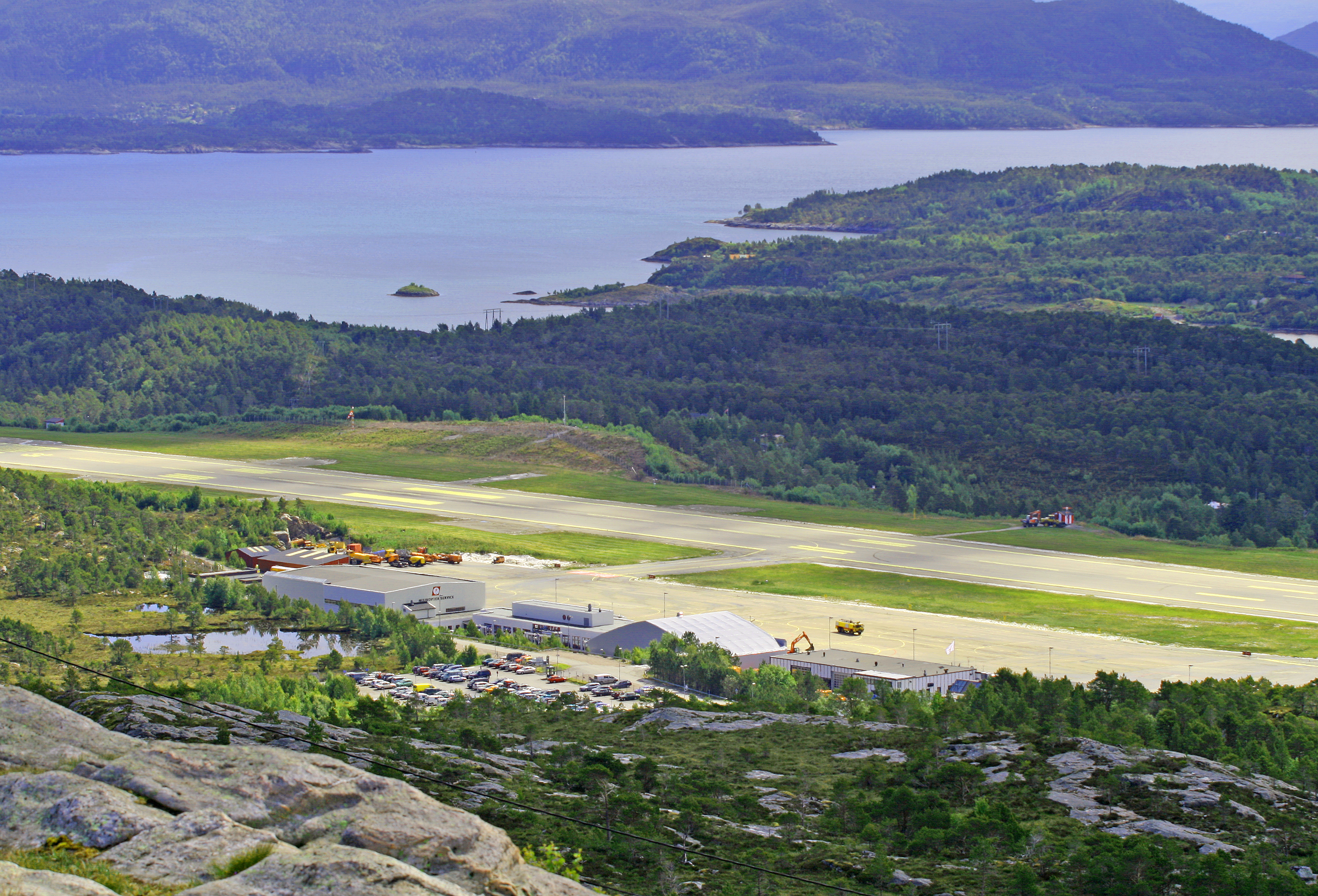
- IATA: KSU; ICAO: ENKB

Summary
- Airport type: Public
- Operator: Avinor
- Serves: Kristiansund, Norway
- Location: Kvernberget, Nordlandet, Kristiansund
- Elevation AMSL: 62 m / 204 ft
- Coordinates: 63°06′43″N 007°49′34″E
- Website: avinor.no

Map

Runways
Direction	Length		Surface
Direction	m	ft	Surface
07/25	1,840	6,037	Asphalt

Statistics (2018)
- Passengers: 314,084
- Aircraft movements: 10,441

Kristiansund Airport (Norwegian: Kristiansund lufthavn; IATA: KSU, ICAO: ENKB) is an international airport serving the town of Kristiansund in Møre og Romsdal county, Norway. It is situated at Kvernberget on the island of Nordlandet in Kristiansund Municipality. It is the sole scheduled airport serving the Nordmøre district within Møre og Romsdal. The airport features a 2,390-meter (7,840 ft) runway aligned 07/25. In addition to scheduled services operated by Scandinavian Airlines and Widerøe, it serves offshore helicopter traffic to the Norwegian Sea operated by CHC Helikopter Service. Kvernberget handled 314,084 passengers in 2018.

Kvernberget was the second airport to open in Møre og Romsdal, with flights commencing on 1 July 1970. Until 2004 the main portion of flights was provided by Braathens SAFE, which flew both coastal flights and to Oslo. The first helicopter terminal opened in 1982 and a new passenger terminal was completed in 1989. A second helicopter terminal opened in 1994. The runway was extended from the original 1,830 meters (6,000 ft) to the current length in 2012. A new terminal was completed in 2017.

== History ==
The first airline services to Kristiansund were part of the Bergen to Trondheim route which Norwegian Air Lines (DNL) established in 1935. These called at Ålesund, Molde and Kristiansund. The latter had its water aerodrome located at the port in the town center. The services were only flown during the winter. DNL resumed its routes in 1948, and Lufttransport commenced a service via Ålesund Airport, Sørneset to Oslo. From 1949 these were both taken over by West Norway Airlines, which lasted until the airline folded in 1957.

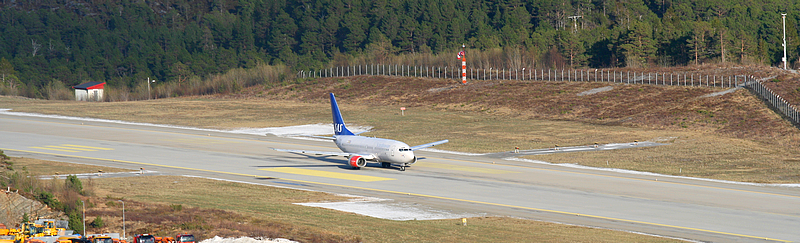
Scandinavian Airlines Boeing 737

The Luftwaffe nearly completed Aukra Airport, Gossen during the Second World War and in the 1950s the authorities decided to complete the facility and establish it as a central airport for Møre og Romsdal. Local initiative in Ålesund convinced Parliament in 1957 that Ålesund Airport, Vigra should be built instead. It opened in 1958. This airport was by Parliament considered as sufficient for all of the county and the seaplane routes were terminated the same season. Poor roads and three ferries meant that driving time to Vigra was about five hours at the time.

Proposals for an airport in Kristiansund were first launched in 1954, with Kvernberget as the preferred site and at an estimated investment cost of 6.5 million Norwegian krone. It had however been placed on hold due to the Gossen plans. In both Molde and Kristiansund there was displeasure with the choice of Vigra and both municipalities established airport commissions in 1959 to look into building their own airports. Kristiansund's commission was led by William Dall and the same year the municipality bought a 54 hectares (130 acres) lot at Kvernberget to reserve it for a future aerodrome.

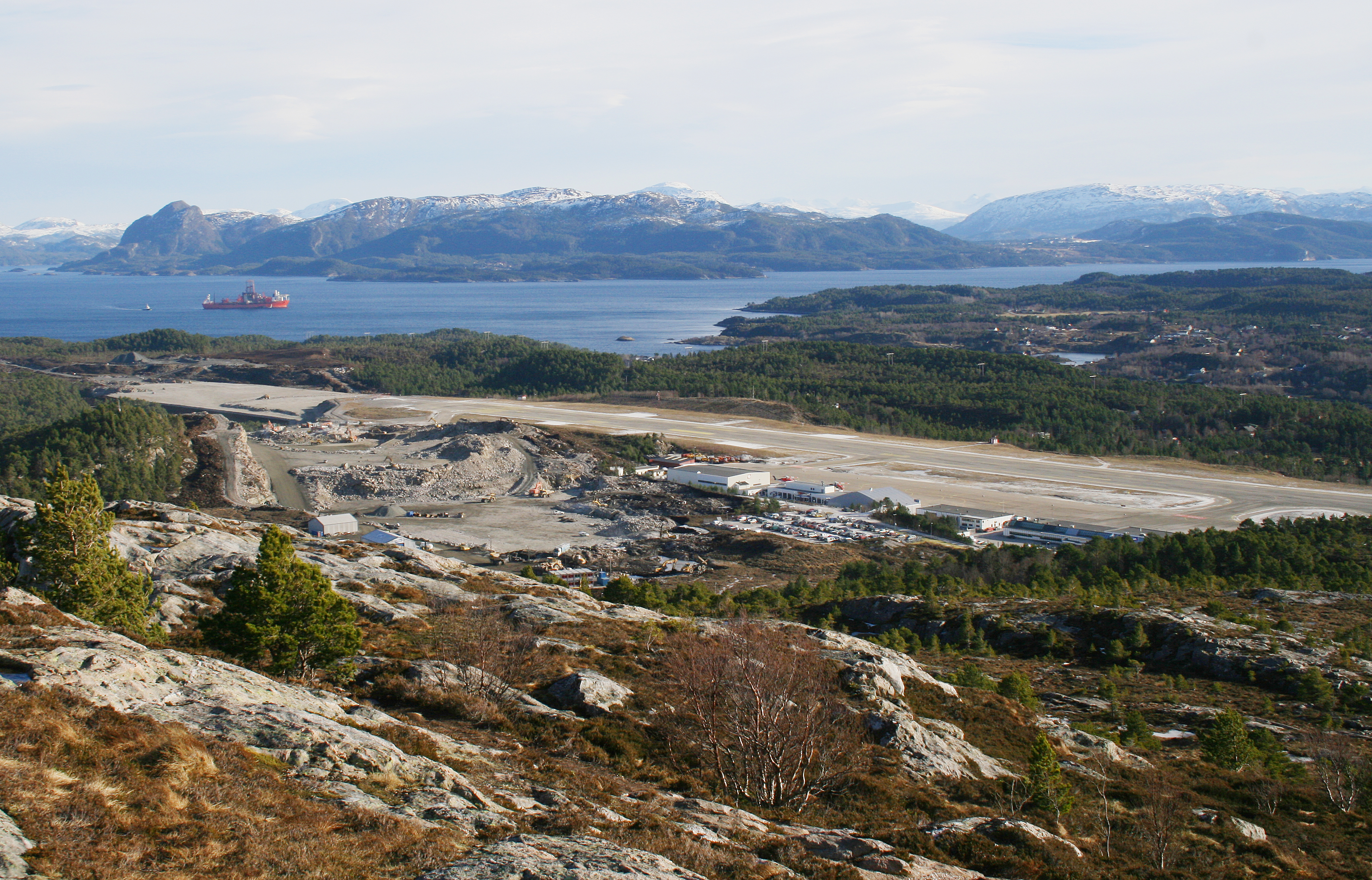
Kvernberget in 2011

In both Kristiansund and Molde the debate centered around whether their respective districts of Nordmøre and Romsdal should have each their respective airport or a shared aerodrome. A national airport commission was established in 1962, which looked at the primary airport structure, including in Nordmøre and Romsdal. It considered Gossen, Hendamyrene on Averøya, Freistranda on Frei and Osmarka. Several of these would be suitable as a site for a shared airport. Within the two towns there was little interest in cooperation and both wanted their own airport, situated close to the town center. The commission recommended in its report of 16 December 1964 that Kristiansund and Molde both be among the nine recommended airports. Kristiansund was given top priority, while Molde was lowest prioritized.

Kvernberget was approved by Parliament on 2 April 1968. It received specifications of the time, which were based on a 1,920-meter (6,300 ft) runway. Construction took 19 months and cost NOK 31 million. The official opening took place on 31 June 1970 and operations commenced the following day.

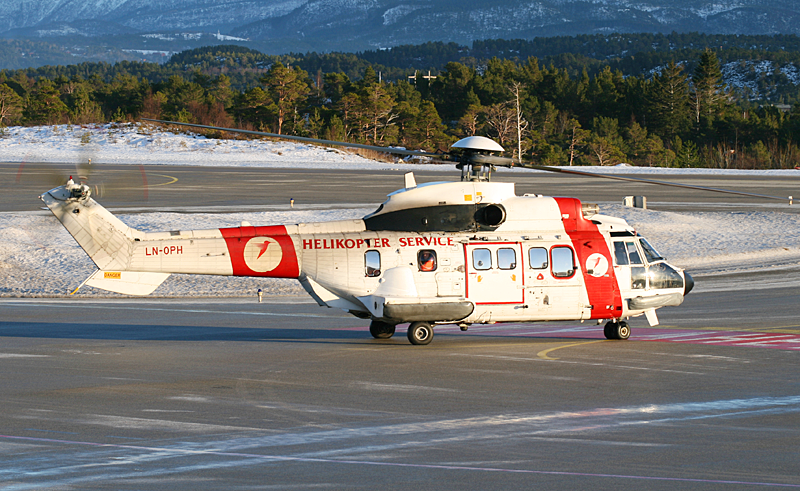
CHC Helikopter Service Eurocopter Super Puma

Both Braathens SAFE and Scandinavian Airlines System (SAS) applied to operate the Oslo Airport, Fornebu route out of Kristiansund. Braathens also applied to extend its coastal route to Kvernberget. The ministry wanted Braathens SAFE to fly the route with a concession granted to SAS, but Braathens SAFE rejected this. Instead, they were granted both the routes on a temporary basis. The new airport received three daily flights to Oslo, of which two went via Ålesund, and four services on the West Coast route to Bergen Airport, Flesland and Trondheim Airport, Værnes. The routes were flown using Fokker F27 Friendship turboprops and Fokker F28 Fellowship turbojets. Widerøe included Kristiansund as part of its coastal network which extended to Ørland Airport and southwards to the regional airports in Sogn og Fjordane.

Molde decided that it would not wait for state funding and initiated construction of Molde Airport, Årø with municipal funding. The new airport opened on 5 April 1972. It cut away half the catchment area of Kvernberget, significantly reducing both ridership and services from Kristiansund Airport. Kvernberget handled 88,246 passengers in 1971, but after Molde opened so high a figure was not reached again until 1985.

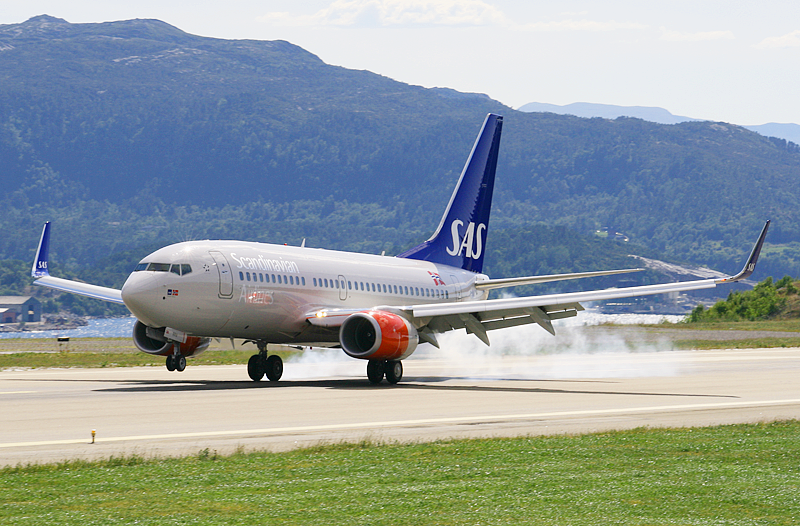
Scandinavian Airlines Boeing 737-700 landing

With the opening of Haltenbanken for petroleum drilling in the early 1980s, the authorities decided that Kristiansund would be the center of operations for the area. This caused the need for offshore helicopter flights to the rigs. Helikopter Service built a base at Kvernberget and commenced flights on 1 July 1982. Braathens opened a 200-square-meter (2,200 sq ft) operations building in 1985. Next the terminal was expanded; costing NOK 27 million, it opened on 12 April 1989. Although infrequently flown from 1972, regular charter flights commenced in 1982. The first inclusive tour flight took off in 1988.

At the turn of the decade the debate about the need for two airports to serve Nordmøre and Romsdal resumed, spurred by the Kristiansund Fixed Link which removed the only ferry between the two towns, but the debate soon died down again. Busy Bee took over some of Braathens' route. When it went out of business in 1992, the regional coastal routes were taken over by Norwegian Air Shuttle. A new 1,400-square-meter (15,000 sq ft) helicopter terminal opened the same year. Helicopter services continued to make up an increasingly important part of the patronage – 26 percent in 1997 and 47 percent in 2007. Widerøe retired its Twin Otters and pulled out of Kristiansund in 1993.

Braathens SAFE introduced services from Kristiansund to Stavanger in 1997, due to the increased oil traffic. Also Aberdeen, Scotland, became an important destination, and there were regular charter flights between the cities, up to five a week. City Star Airlines operated a scheduled route between the two cities from 2005 until the airline folded in 2008.

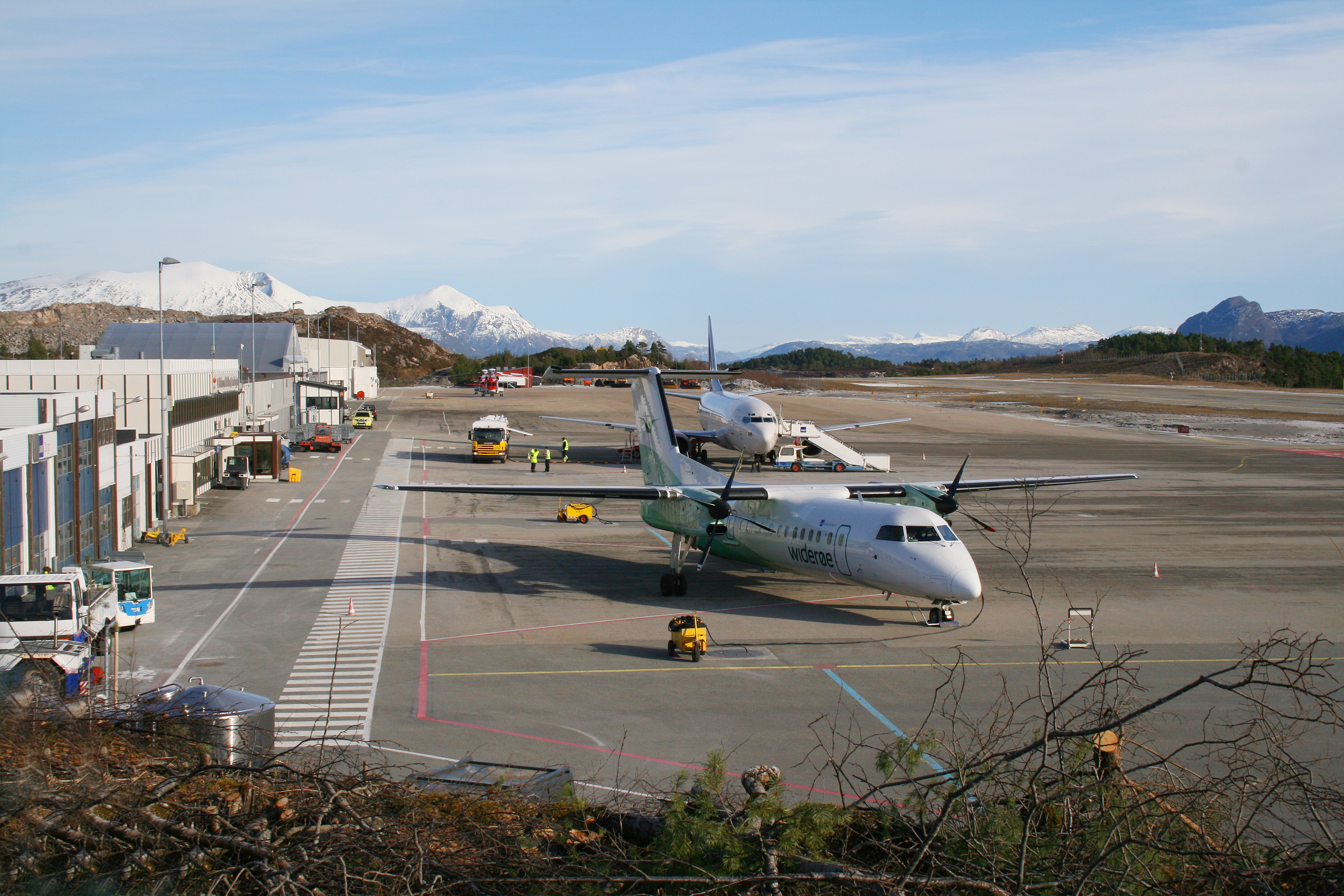
Widerøe Bombardier Dash 8 (closest) and Scandinavian Airlines Boeing 737 at the airport

SAS Commuter took over Norwegian Air Shuttle's services from 1 April 2003. Braathens merged to create SAS Braathens in May 2004, with the new airline taking over the Oslo route. It passed on the Scandinavian Airlines in 2007. City Star Airlines commenced the first international route, to Aberdeen Airport, on 10 October 2005 using a Dornier 328. The route lasted until February 2008.

A duty-free shop was opened in 2007. Avinor carried out a major overhaul of the airport starting in 2010. NOK 240 million was spent extending the runway from 1,760 to 2,380 meters (5,770 to 7,810 ft). This allowed heavier aircraft to take off and will increase the desirability to use the aerodrome for Mediterranean inclusive tour charters. This opened on 19 October 2012, shortly after a new and larger car parking lot had been taken into use. The next stage has been the construction of a larger terminal. Other minor projects were a new general aviation hangar and a new helicopter hangar. Total investments were estimated at NOK 500 million and were completed in 2017.

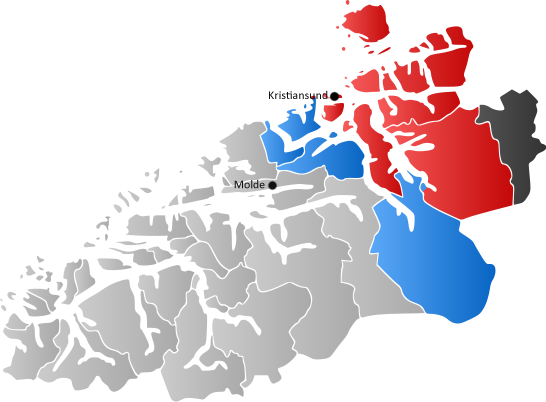
The airport's catchment area (red) and areas which are in equilibrium between Kristiansund Airport and Molde Airport, Årø (blue)

SAS Commuter's routes to Bergen and Trondheim were taken over by Widerøe in 2010. BMI Regional introduced a daily round trip with an Embraer 135 from Kristiansund to Aberdeen on 28 August 2013, targeting the oil industry. The airline commenced a domestic route on 23 January 2014, to Stavanger Airport, Sola. This route was terminate din May the same year.

== Facilities ==
Kristiansund Airport is located on the ridge of Kvernberget, a hill on the island of Nordlandet in Kristiansund, Norway. Owned and operated by the state-owned Avinor, it is the sole airport with scheduled services in Nordmøre. It features an asphalt runway with physical dimensions 2,390 by 45 meters (7,841 by 148 ft) aligned 07/25. It has a takeoff run available (TORA) of 2,080 and 2,070 meters (6,820 and 6,790 ft) on runways 07 and 25, respectively, and a landing distance available (LDA) of 2,000 meters (6,600 ft). It is equipped with a category I instrument landing system in both directions. The airport is equipped with category 7 fire and rescue service. There is no parallel taxiway.

== Airlines and destinations ==
The busiest route is provided by Scandinavian Airlines, which provides two daily departures to Oslo using mostly Airbus A320neo aircraft. Flights along the West Coast to Bergen Airport are provided by Widerøe using Bombardier Dash 8 aircraft. CHC Helikopter Service operates out of Kristiansund Airport to nine offshore oil platforms in the Norwegian Sea. There are also some seasonal charter services. Operation of the airport ran at a deficit of NOK 23 million in 2012. In 2018, Kvernberget airport served 314,084 passengers and had 10,441 aircraft movements.

Airlines	Destinations
Scandinavian Airlines	Oslo; Seasonal charter: Chania, Gran Canaria
Widerøe	Bergen

== Statistics ==
Annual passenger traffic
Year	Passengers	% Change
2025	366,834	▲12.3%
2024	326,798	▲13.0%
2023	289,304	▲3.0%
2022	280,972	▲42.5%
2021	197,126	▼ -5.6%
2020	208,830	▼ -35.9%
2019	325,594	▲3.7%
2018	314,084	▲4.8%
2017	299,710	▼ -1.3%
2016	303,505	▼ -17.1%
2015	366,292	

== Ground transport ==
The airport is situated 7 kilometers (4.3 mi) drive from the town center, just off National Road 70. Fram operates two bus services past the airport, each which run twice an hour. Travel time is about twenty-five minutes. There is paid parking for 350 vehicles. Taxis and car rental is available.

== Bibliography ==
- Arnesen, Odd (1984). På grønne vinger over Norge (in Norwegian). Widerøe's Flyveselskap.
- Hjelle, Bjørn Owe (2007). Ålesund lufthavn Vigra (in Norwegian). Valderøya. ISBN 978-82-92055-28-1.
- Olsen-Hagen, Bernt; Gulstad, Anne Blix; Gynnild, Olav (2010). Kristiansund lufthavn, Kvernberget – Dokumentasjon for arkivmessig bevaring (PDF) (in Norwegian). Norwegian Aviation Museum. Archived (PDF) from the original on 15 January 2015.
- Olsen-Hagen, Bernt Charles (2014). Offshore Helicopters: Helikopteraktiviteten på norsk kontinentalsokkel. Aviation Forlag. ISBN 978-82-999547-0-9.
- Tjomsland, Audun; Wilsberg, Kjell (1995). Braathens SAFE 50 år: Mot alle odds. Oslo. ISBN 82-990400-1-9.
