= Nordsund Bridge (Kristiansund) =

Nordsund Bridge Nordsundbrua
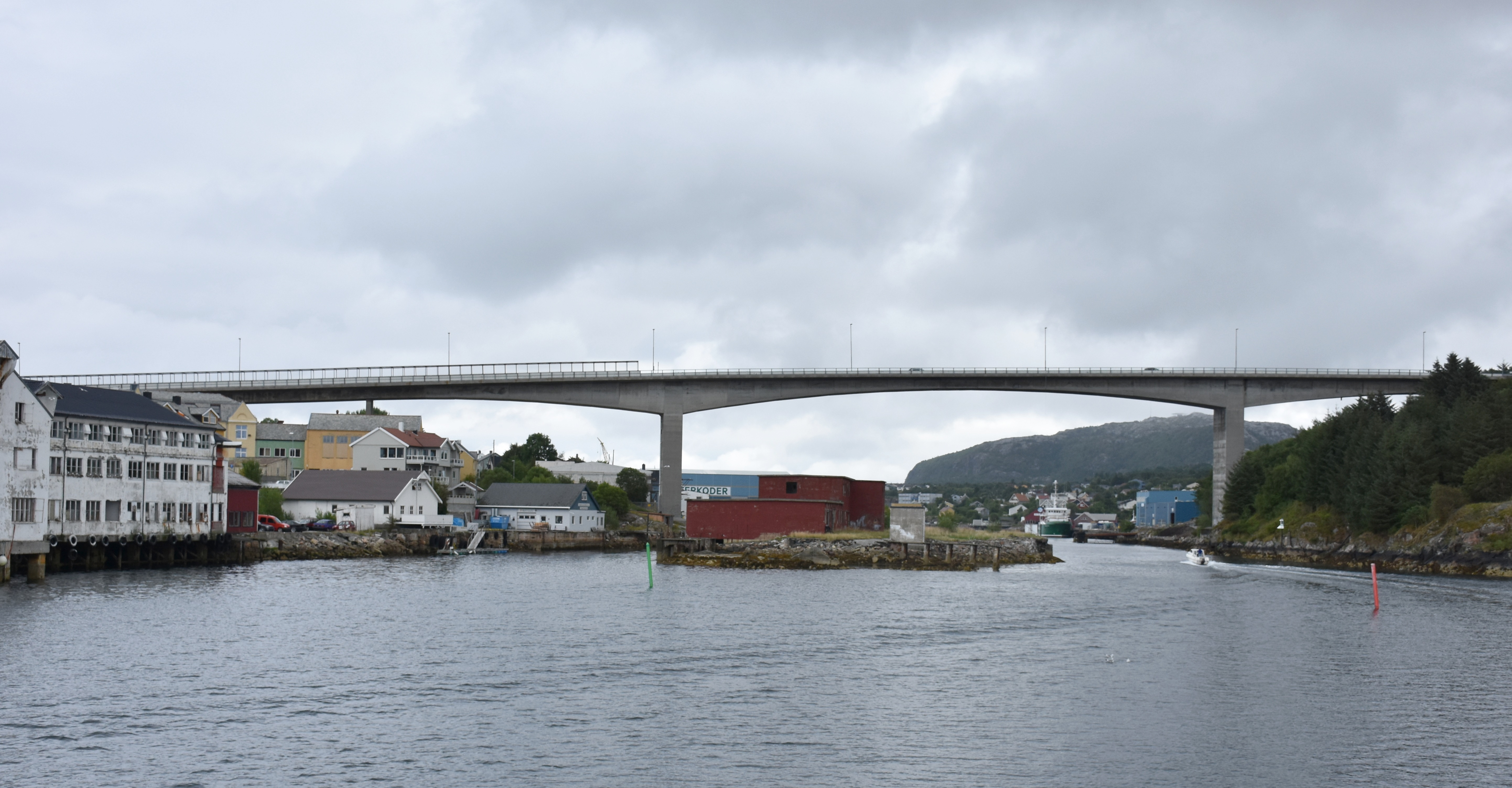
- Coordinates: 63.1167°N 7.7505°E
- Carries: Rv70
- Crosses: Nordsundet
- Locale: Kristiansund, Norway

Characteristics
- Total length: 333 metres (1,093 ft)
- Clearance below: 28 metres (92 ft)

Location
- Interactive map of Nordsund Bridge

The Nordsund Bridge (Norwegian: Nordsundbrua) is a bridge that crosses the Nordsundet strait between the islands of Nordlandet and Gomalandet in the town of Kristiansund which is in Kristiansund Municipality, Møre og Romsdal county, Norway. The bridge is 333 metres (1,093 ft) long, and the maximum clearance to the sea is 28 metres (92 ft). The bridge carries Norwegian National Road 70.

The current bridge replaced an older bridge that was opened on 20 December 1936. The old bridge was a steel arch bridge that was 304 metres (997 ft) long and had a main span of 80 metres (260 ft).

== See also ==
- List of bridges in Norway
- List of bridges in Norway by length
- List of bridges
- List of bridges by length
- Sørsund Bridge
