= Frei (island) =

Island in Møre og Romsdal, Norway

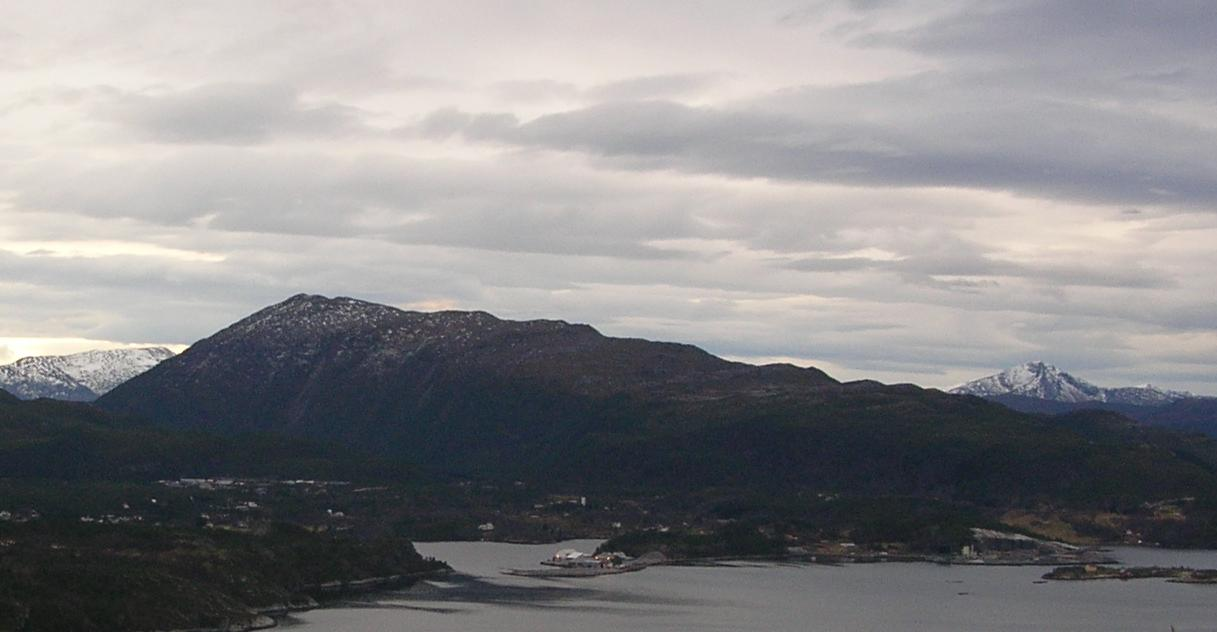
- Interactive map of Frei

Geography
- Location: Møre og Romsdal, Norway
- Coordinates: 63.067116°N 7.815055°E
- Area: 63.1 km^{2} (24.4 sq mi)
- Length: 11.2 km (6.96 mi)
- Width: 9.3 km (5.78 mi)
- Highest elevation: 629 m (2064 ft)
- Highest point: Freikollen

Administration
- Norway
- County: Møre og Romsdal
- Municipality: Kristiansund

Frei is an island in Kristiansund Municipality in Møre og Romsdal county, Norway. The 63.1-square-kilometre (24.4 sq mi) island lies south of the town of Kristiansund in the Nordmøre region of the county. The main villages on the island include Rensvik in the north, Kvalvåg in the east, and Nedre Frei in the south.

== Geography ==
The highest point on the island is the 629-metre (2,064 ft) mountain Freikollen. The island is covered with mountains, pine forests, marshes, and sparse other vegetation. The Freifjorden lies to the east and south, the Kvernesfjorden and Bremsnesfjorden lie to the west, and the Bolgsvaet bay and Omsundet strait lie to the north. The islands of Nordlandet, Kirkelandet, and Innlandet lie north of Frei; the island of Averøya lies to the west; the islands of Bergsøya and Aspøya lie to the southeast; and the island of Tustna lies to the northeast.

== History ==
The Viking-era Battle of Rastarkalv, between Haakon I of Norway and the sons of Eric I of Norway, took place near the village of Nedre Frei in 955 AD.

The island was part of the old Frei Municipality from 1838 until 2008 when the island was merged into Kristiansund Municipality.

=== Name ===
The meaning of the name "Frei" (Old Norse: Freiðr) is unknown, but is may be derived from fríðr which means "good" or "beautiful". Until 1889, the name was written Fredø. The island is also referred to as Freiøya, which means the "island of Frei". That name was often used to distinguish the island from the old Frei Municipality.

== Transportation ==
The island is crossed by the Norwegian National Road 70 which is part of the Krifast network of roads, bridges, and tunnels that connect the town of Kristiansund to the mainland. The Freifjord Tunnel connects Frei to the island of Bergsøya (to the south) and the Omsund Bridge connects Frei to the island of Nordlandet (to the north).

== See also ==
- List of islands of Norway
