= Nedre Frei =

Village in Kristiansund Municipality, Norway

- Village
- Interactive map of Nedre Frei
- Location within Møre og Romsdal Location within Norway
- Coordinates: 63°01′27″N 07°48′23″E
- Country: Norway
- Region: Western Norway
- County: Møre og Romsdal
- District: Nordmøre
- Municipality: Kristiansund Municipality
- Elevation: 24 m (79 ft)
- Time zone: UTC+01:00 (CET)
  - Summer (DST): UTC+02:00 (CEST)
- Post Code: 6524 Frei

Nedre Frei is a village in Kristiansund Municipality in Møre og Romsdal County, Norway. The village is located along the Freifjorden on the southern part of the island of Frei. The village sits about 8 kilometres (5.0 mi) south of the village of Rensvik, about 6 kilometres (3.7 mi) southwest of the village of Kvalvåg, and about 2 kilometres (1.2 mi) southeast of the village of Storbakken. Nedre Frei is the site of Frei Church, the main church for the island.

The northern end of the Freifjord Tunnel is located just west of the village, connecting the island to the nearby island of Bergsøya and then on to the mainland via a bridge.

The Viking-era Battle of Rastarkalv, between Haakon I of Norway and the sons of Eric I of Norway, took place near the village of Nedre Frei in 955 AD.

== See also ==
- Frei Municipality
