= Buvika =

Village in Skaun Municipality, Norway

- Village
- Interactive map of Buvika
- Location within Trøndelag Location within Norway
- Coordinates: 63.31251°N 10.18406°E
- Country: Norway
- Region: Central Norway
- County: Trøndelag
- District: Orkdalen
- Municipality: Skaun Municipality

Area
  - Total: 1.48 km^{2} (0.57 sq mi)
- Elevation: 3 m (9.8 ft)

Population (2024)
  - Total: 3,193
  - Density: 2,157/km^{2} (5,590/sq mi)
- Time zone: UTC+01:00 (CET)
  - Summer (DST): UTC+02:00 (CEST)
- Post Code: 7350 Buvika

Buvika is a village in Skaun Municipality in Trøndelag county, Norway. It is located at the end of the Gaulosen, an arm of the Trondheimsfjord, about 3.5 kilometres (2.2 mi) southwest of the mouth of the Gaula River. Buvika lies along the European route E39, about halfway between the villages of Børsa and Nypan/Klett. Buvik Church is located in the village.

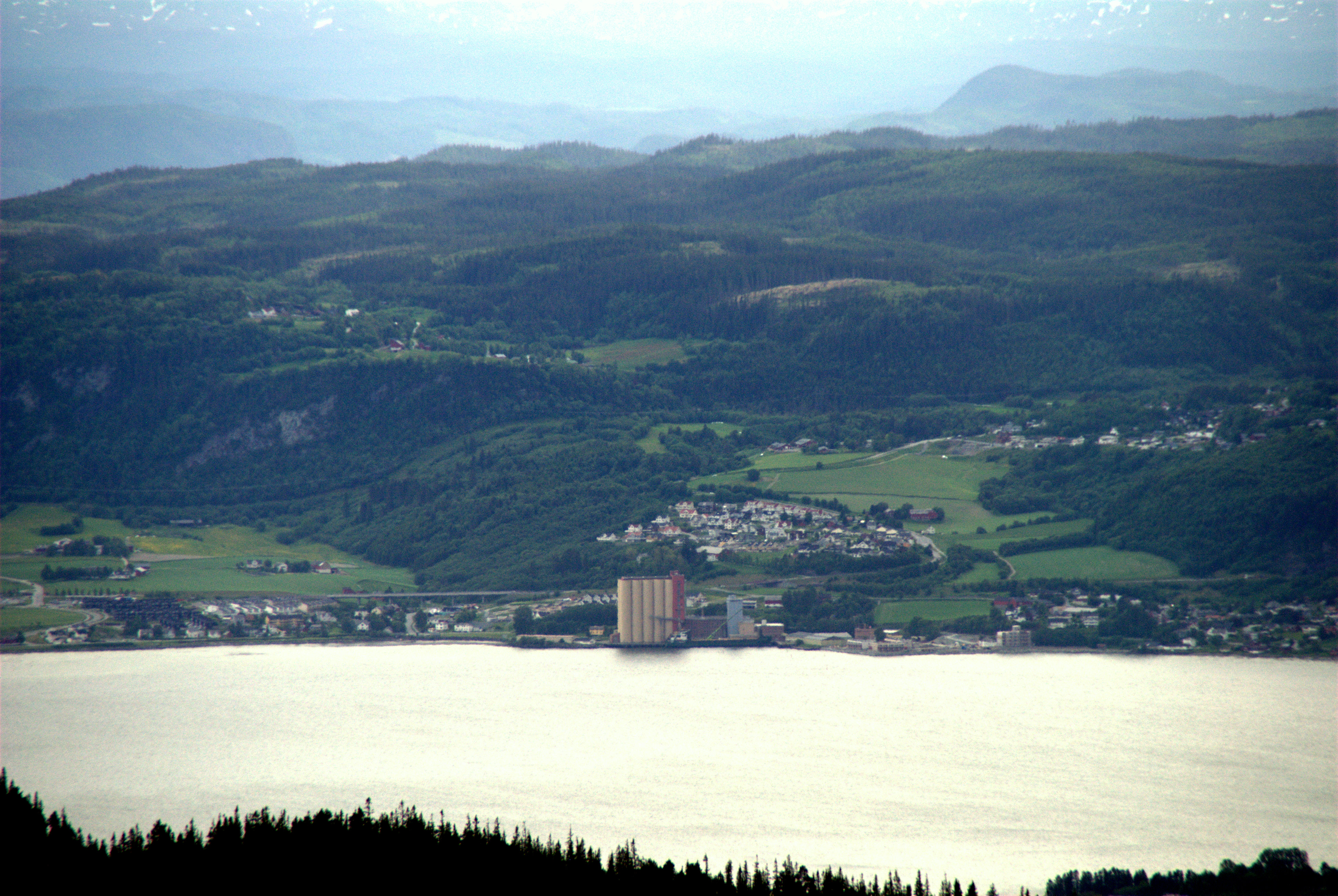
View of Buvika, looking south

The western part of the village of Buvika is called Ilhaugen. Together, the 1.48-square-kilometre (370-acre) village area has a population (2024) of 3,193 and a population density of 2,157 inhabitants per square kilometre (5,590/sq mi).

== History ==
The village of Buvika was the administrative centre of the old Buvik Municipality which existed from 1855 until its dissolution in 1965.
