= Norwegian National Road 70 =

National road in Trøndelag and Møre og Romsdal, Norway

Coordinates: 62°42′20″N 8°33′20″E

National Road 70
- Bokmål: Riksvei 70; Nynorsk: Riksveg 70

Route information
- Length: 162.0 km (100.7 mi)

Major junctions
- West end: Kristiansund
- North end: E6 in Oppdal

Location
- Country: Norway
- Counties: Møre og Romsdal, Trøndelag
- Major cities: Kristiansund, Tingvollvågen, Sunndalsøra, Oppdal

Highway system
- Roads in Norway; National Roads; County Roads

National Road 70 (Norwegian: Riksvei 70) is a 162.0-kilometre (100.7 mi) long national highway that runs from the town of Kristiansund in Kristiansund Municipality in Møre og Romsdal county and the village of Oppdal in Oppdal Municipality in Trøndelag county, Norway.

The road starts in downtown Kristiansund. It passes an intersection with the terminus of County Road 64, before passing by Kristiansund Airport, Kvernberget. The road crosses via the Nordsund Bridge from the island of Nordlandet to the island of Gomalandet. From Gomalandet to the island of Bergsøya, it crosses under the Freifjorden in the Freifjord Tunnel, and then onwards to the mainland via the Bergsøysund Bridge and the Straumsund Bridge. The tunnels and bridges are part of Kristiansund Mainland Connection, which is a toll road. From Bergsøya to Viken, the road runs concurrently with European route E39. From there, it runs through Tingvollvågen and Sunndalsøra and on to Oppdal, where it intersects with the European route E6 highway.
