= Kristiansund Mainland Connection =

Norwegian road

Coordinates: 62°58′28″N 7°46′40″E

System information
- Length: 16 mi (26 km)
- Formed: 1992

Highway names

System links
- Roads in Norway; National Roads; County Roads

The Kristiansund Mainland Connection (Norwegian: Kristiansund fastlandsforbindelse or abbreviated Krifast) is a road system consisting of the European route E39 highway and Norwegian National Road 70 that connects Kristiansund Municipality to the neighboring islands of Frei, Bergsøya, and Aspøya and then to the mainland of Norway. Krifast opened in 1992 and consists of 25 kilometres (16 mi) of road and 6 kilometres (3.7 mi) of bicycle paths. The three main structures are the undersea Freifjord Tunnel, the Gjemnessund Bridge, and the Bergsøysund Bridge. The Straumsund Bridge is also part of the network.

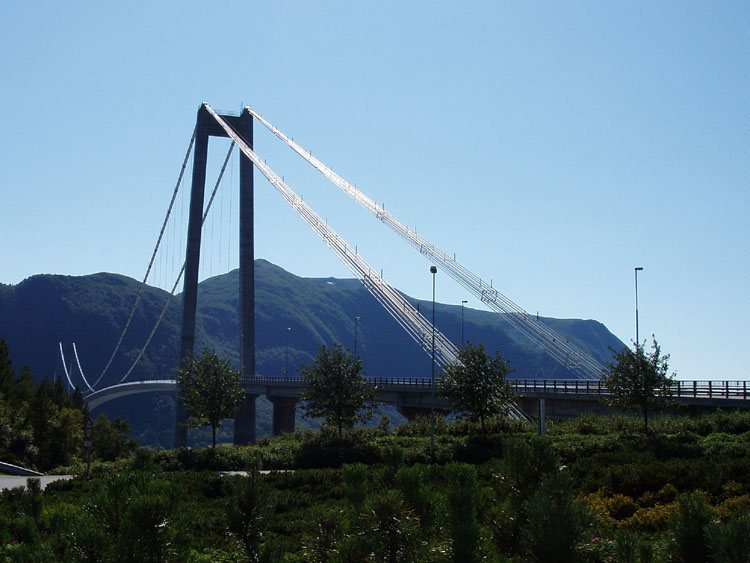
Gjemnessundbrua, the suspension bridge

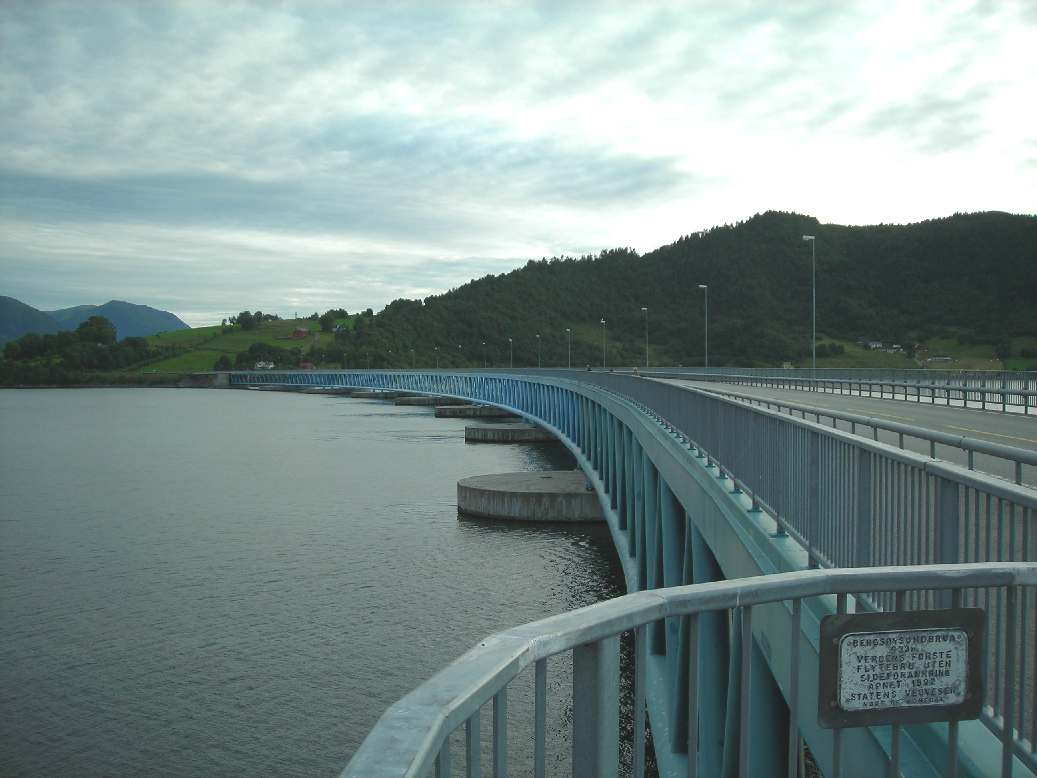
Bersøysundbrua, the pontoon bridge

A total of seven bridges are part of the Krifast system, the most famous one being the suspension bridge Gjemnessund Bridge from the island of Bergsøya to the mainland of Gjemnes Municipality, with 108-metre (354 ft) high towers and a span between them of 623 metres (2,044 ft). There is also the 933-metre (3,061 ft) long pontoon bridge called the Bergsøysund Bridge which goes between the islands of Bergsøya and Aspøya, which is the only bridge of its kind where nothing but the ends are anchored to solid rock. The bridge is supported by 7 pontoons, floating on a 320-metre (1,050 ft) deep fjord.

The 5.1-kilometre (3.2 mi) long underwater Freifjord Tunnel goes under the Freifjorden. It is reaches a depth of 134 metres (440 ft) below sea level at its deepest point, though the bottom 35 metres (115 ft) of the tunnel is in solid rock. A drive through the tunnel takes about 5 minutes. Because of the relatively steep climb, there are three lanes at each end, but only two at the bottom.

Krifast was authorized by the Norwegian Parliament and construction began in October 1988. The government pledged to finance 39% of the expenses, the rest were to be taken in as toll on road traffic and car ferry fares (on the ferries to be discontinued due to the new tunnel and bridges). As of July 1991, the project employed 427 people, and spent 2 million kr daily on construction. Four years and NOK 1.1 billion later, in August 1992, Krifast was opened for regular traffic.

== See also ==
- Atlantic Ocean Tunnel
