= Bergsøya =

Bergsøy or Bergsøya may refer to:

== Places ==
- Bergsøya, Akershus, an island in Enebakk municipality in Akershus county, Norway
- Bergsøya, Gjemnes, an island in Gjemnes municipality in Møre og Romsdal county, Norway
- Bergsøya, Herøy, an island in Herøy municipality in Møre og Romsdal county, Norway
- Bergsøya, Nordland, an island in Vestvågøy municipality in Nordland county, Norway

== Sports ==
- Bergsøy IL, an association football club in Herøy municipality in Møre og Romsdal county, Norway
