= Freifjord Tunnel =

Undersea tunnel in Møre og Romsdal, Norway

Freifjord Tunnel Freifjordtunnelen
- Interactive map of Freifjord Tunnel; Freifjordtunnelen

Overview
- Location: Kristiansund and Gjemnes, Norway
- Coordinates: 62.9818°N 7.7955°E
- Route: Rv70
- Start: Bergsøya
- End: Frei

Operation
- Opened: 1992
- Traffic: Automotive

Technical
- Length: 5,086 metres (16,686 ft)
- Min elevation: −130 metres (−430 ft)
- Width: 9 metres (30 ft)
- Grade: 9%

The Freifjord Tunnel (Norwegian: Freifjordtunnelen) is a 5,086-metre (3.2 mi) long undersea tunnel under the Freifjorden in Møre og Romsdal county, Norway. The tunnel is part of the Norwegian National Road 70. The tunnel begins on the island of Frei in Kristiansund Municipality and then descends 130 metres (430 ft) below the Freifjorden and ends on the island of Bergsøya in Gjemnes Municipality. The tunnel opened in 1992 as part of the Krifast system which connects the city of Kristiansund to the mainland of Norway through this tunnel and then across either the Bergsøysund Bridge or the Gjemnessund Bridge from Bergsøya.
