= Straumsund Bridge =

Bridge in Tingvoll Municipality, Norway

Straumsund Bridge Straumsundbrua
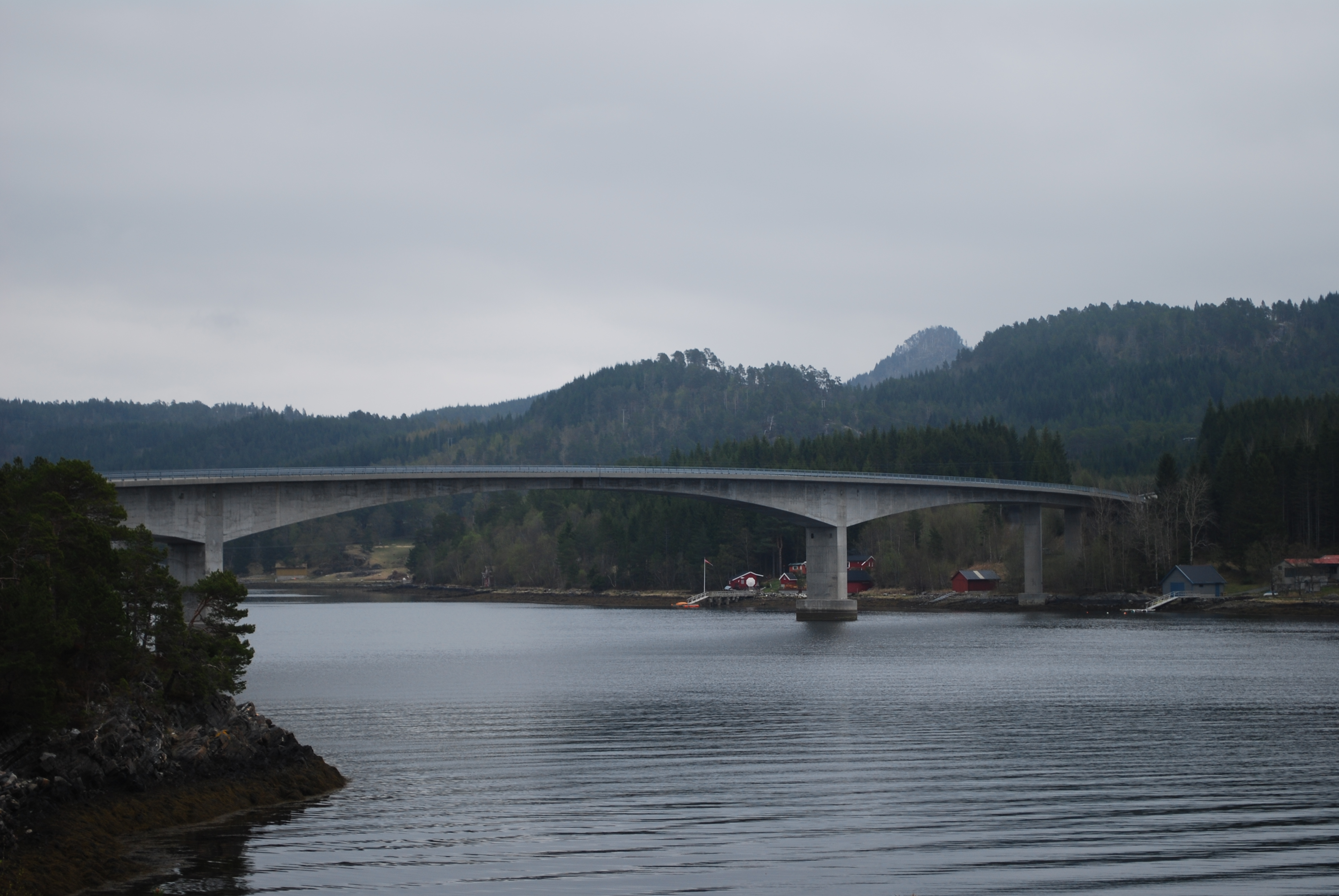
- View of the bridge
- Coordinates: 63°01′N 7°59′E

Characteristics
- Total length: 412 metres (1,352 ft)
- Longest span: 146 metres (479 ft)

Location
- Interactive map of Straumsund Bridge

The Straumsund Bridge (Norwegian: Straumsundbrua) is a bridge in Tingvoll Municipality in Møre og Romsdal county, Norway. The bridge crosses the Straumsundet strait between the mainland and the island of Aspøya. The bridge is 412 metres (1,352 ft) long, and the longest span is 146 metres (479 ft).

The Straumsund Bridge was opened in 1991. It is part of Krifast, the town of Kristiansund's road connection to the mainland.

== See also ==
- List of bridges in Norway
- Bergsøysund Bridge
- Gjemnessund Bridge
