= Kattem =

Neighborhood in the city of Trondheim, Norway

- Neighborhood in Trondheim
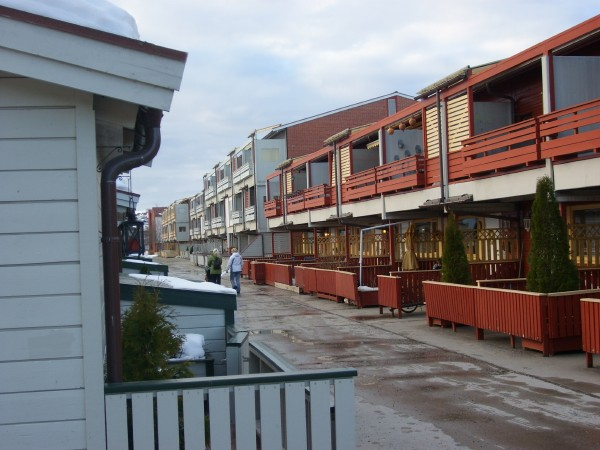
- View of the neighborhood
- Interactive map of Kattem
- Coordinates: 63.3454°N 10.3326°E
- Country: Norway
- Region: Central Norway
- County: Trøndelag
- Municipality: Trondheim Municipality
- Borough: Heimdal
- Elevation: 145 m (476 ft)
- Time zone: UTC+01:00 (CET)
  - Summer (DST): UTC+02:00 (CEST)

Kattem is a neighborhood in the city of Trondheim in Trøndelag county, Norway. The area is located in the borough of Heimdal in Trondheim Municipality, south of Lundåsen, north of the village of Klett, and southwest of the village of Heimdal. The residential areas were built during the 1970s. It is the site of the Kattem IL sports team.
