= Eikefet Tunnel =

Road tunnel in Hordaland county, Norway

Eikefet Tunnel Eikefettunnelen
- Interactive map of Eikefet Tunnel; Eikefettunnelen

Overview
- Location: Vestland, Norway
- Coordinates: 60.6757°N 5.5057°E
- Status: In use
- Route: E39
- Start: Eikefet
- End: Odnåstjørni

Operation
- Opened: 27 March 1980
- Character: Automotive

Technical
- Length: 4,910 metres (16,110 ft)

The Eikefet Tunnel (Norwegian: Eikefettunnelen) is a road tunnel in Alver Municipality in Vestland county, Norway. The 4,910-metre (3.05 mi) tunnel is part of the European route E39 highway through the mountain Kjellrusen from the village of Eikefet to Odnåstjørni. The tunnel is the longest of a series of tunnels along this highway through Lindås.

The tunnel was opened on 27 March 1980. When it opened, it was Norway's longest road tunnel. Eikefet has rated poorly in safety testing by the European Tunnel Assessment Programme. This is due to long distances between emergency pull off areas and emergency phones; poor lighting; few escape routes; poor fire safety; and lanes that are only 3 metres (9.8 ft) wide.
