= Gjemnes Church =

Church in Møre og Romsdal, Norway

- Gjemnes kyrkje
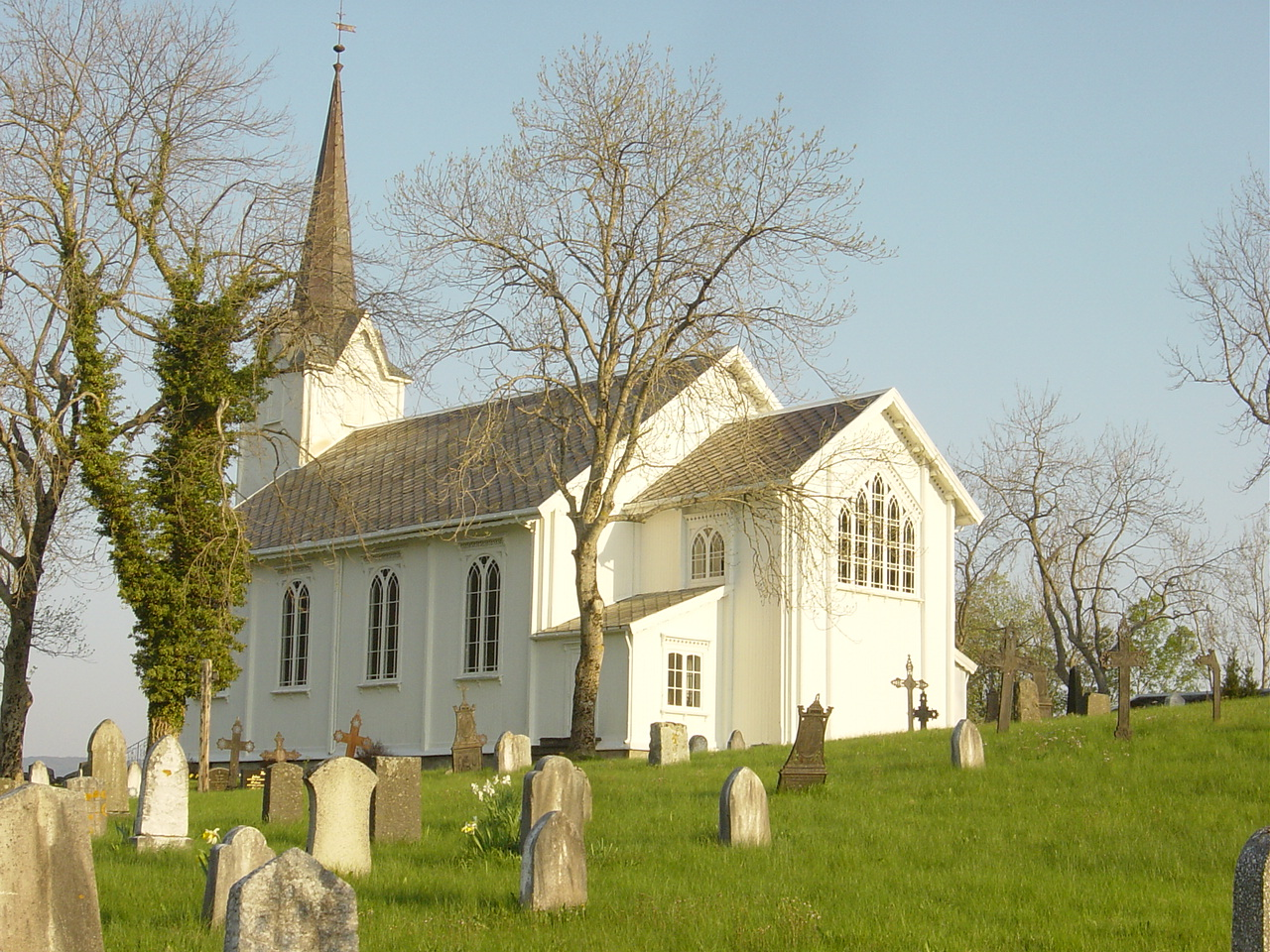
- View of the church
- Gjemnes Church
- 62°57′48″N 7°46′41″E
- Location: Gjemnes Municipality, Møre og Romsdal
- Country: Norway
- Denomination: Church of Norway
- Churchmanship: Evangelical Lutheran

History
- Status: Parish church
- Founded: 1893
- Consecrated: 1893

Architecture
- Functional status: Active
- Architect: Jacob Wilhelm Nordan
- Architectural type: Long church
- Completed: 1893 (133 years ago)

Specifications
- Capacity: 310
- Materials: Wood

Administration
- Diocese: Møre bispedømme
- Deanery: Indre Nordmøre prosti
- Parish: Gjemnes
- Norwegian Cultural Heritage Site
- Type: Church
- Status: Not protected
- ID: 84249

Gjemnes Church (Norwegian: Gjemnes kyrkje) is a parish church of the Church of Norway in Gjemnes Municipality in Møre og Romsdal county, Norway. It is located in the village of Gjemnes, along the Batnfjorden. It is the church for the Gjemnes parish which is part of the Indre Nordmøre prosti (deanery) in the Diocese of Møre. The white, wooden church was built in a long church design in 1893 by the architect Jacob Wilhelm Nordan. The church seats about 310 people.

== History ==
The new parish of Gjemnes was established in 1893 when Gjemnes Municipality was created. This is also when the first church here was built. The church was designed by Jacob Wilhelm Nordan and it was one of his last since he died in 1892 and the plans he draw were not actually used until 1893 when the church was built. The wooden long church has a tower on the west end and a pair of sacristies on either side of the choir.

== Media gallery ==
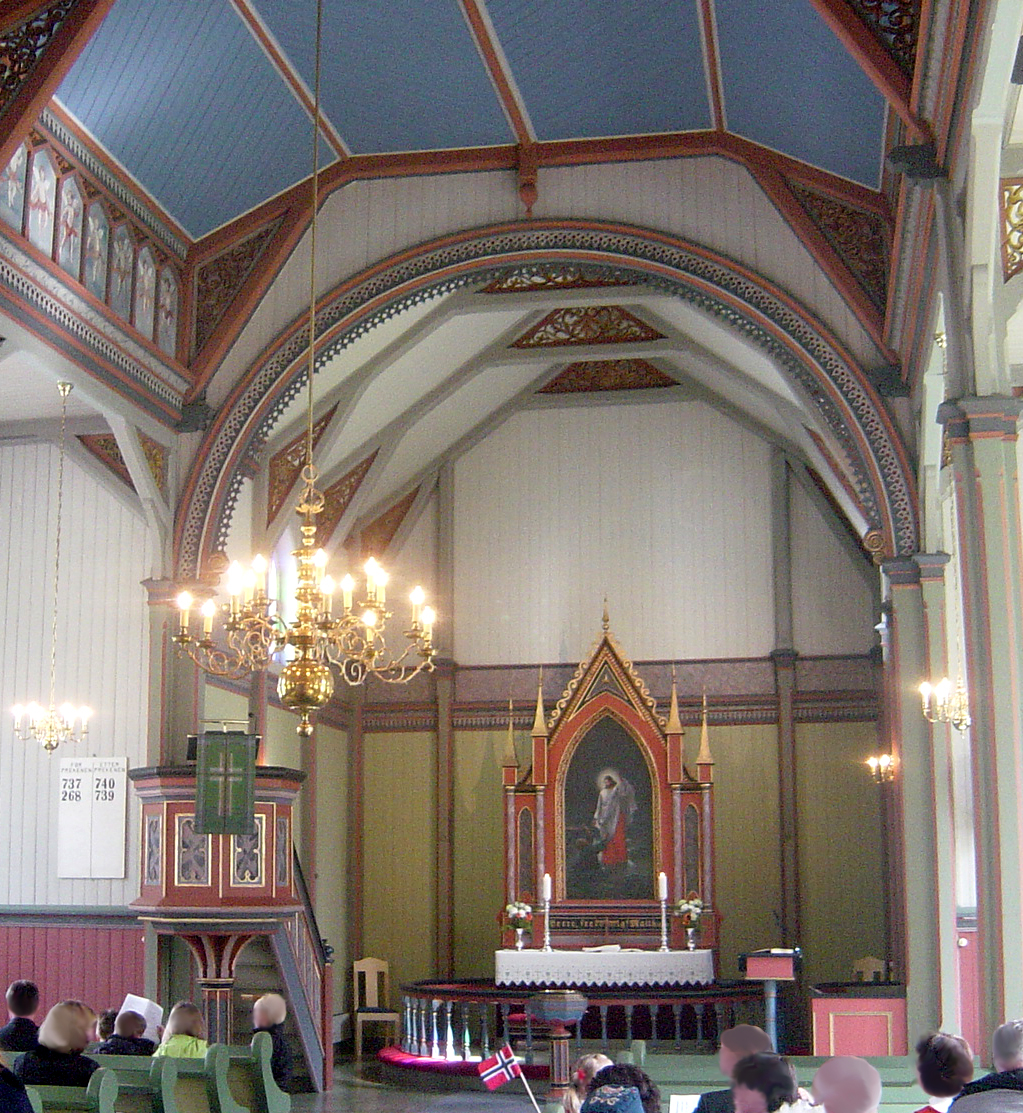
Altar

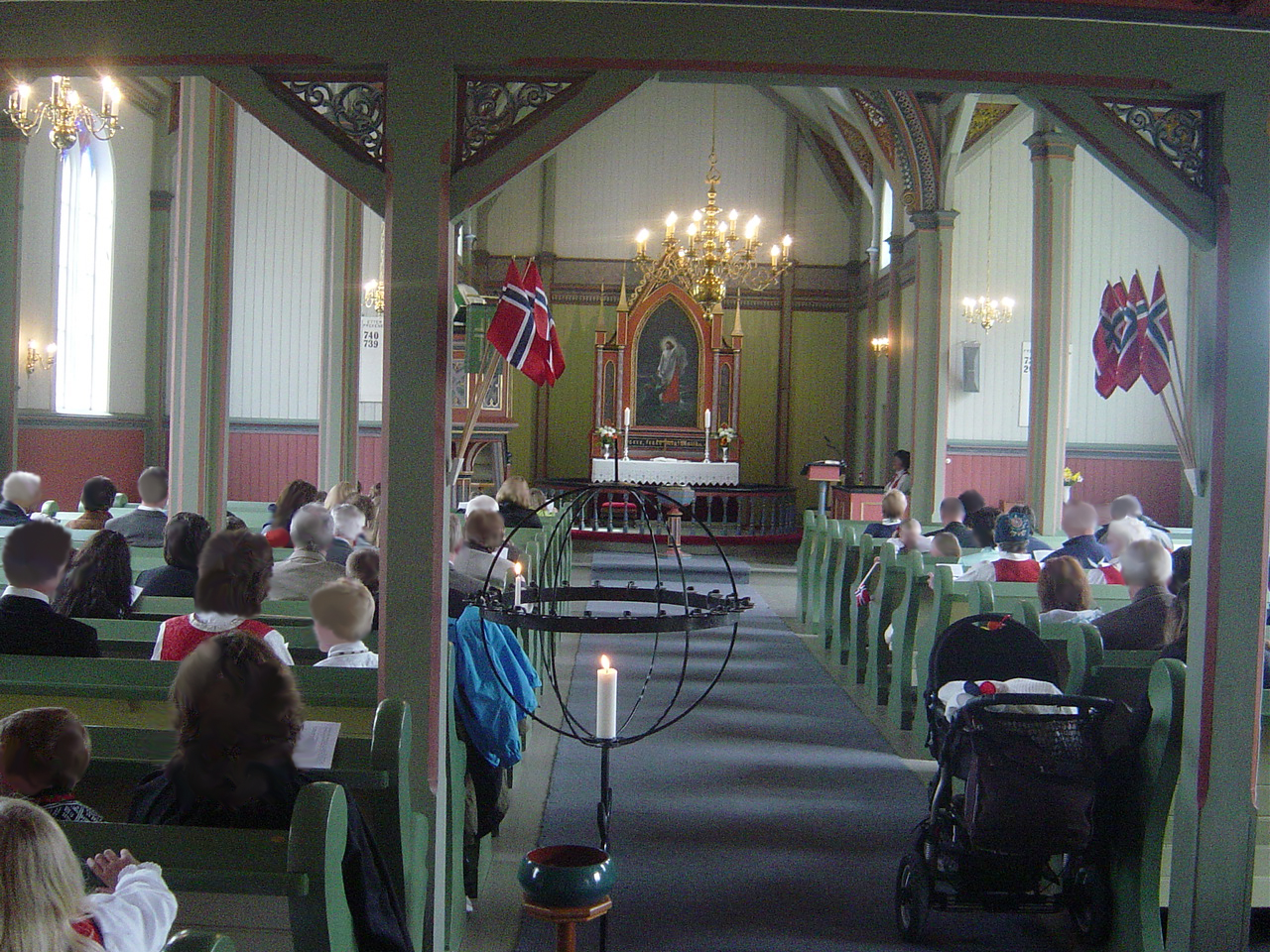
Interior

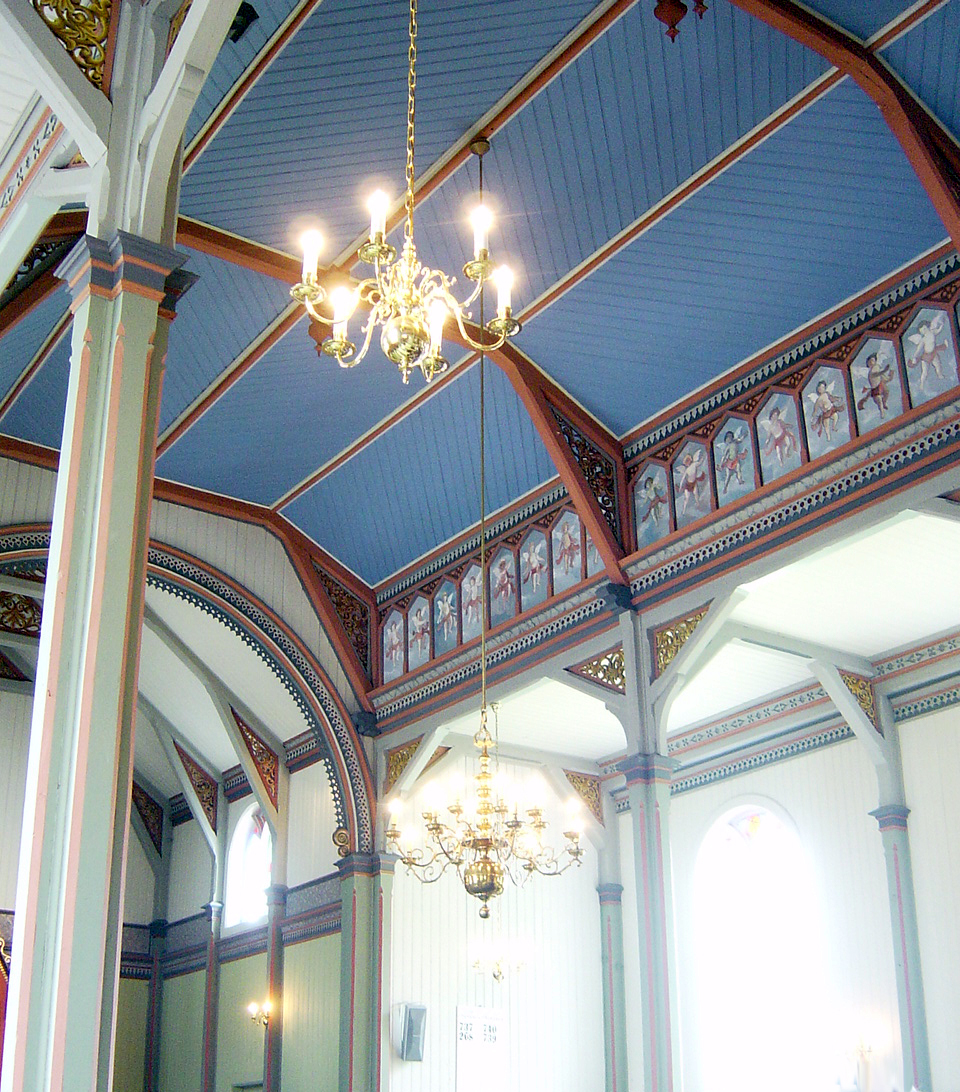
Ceiling

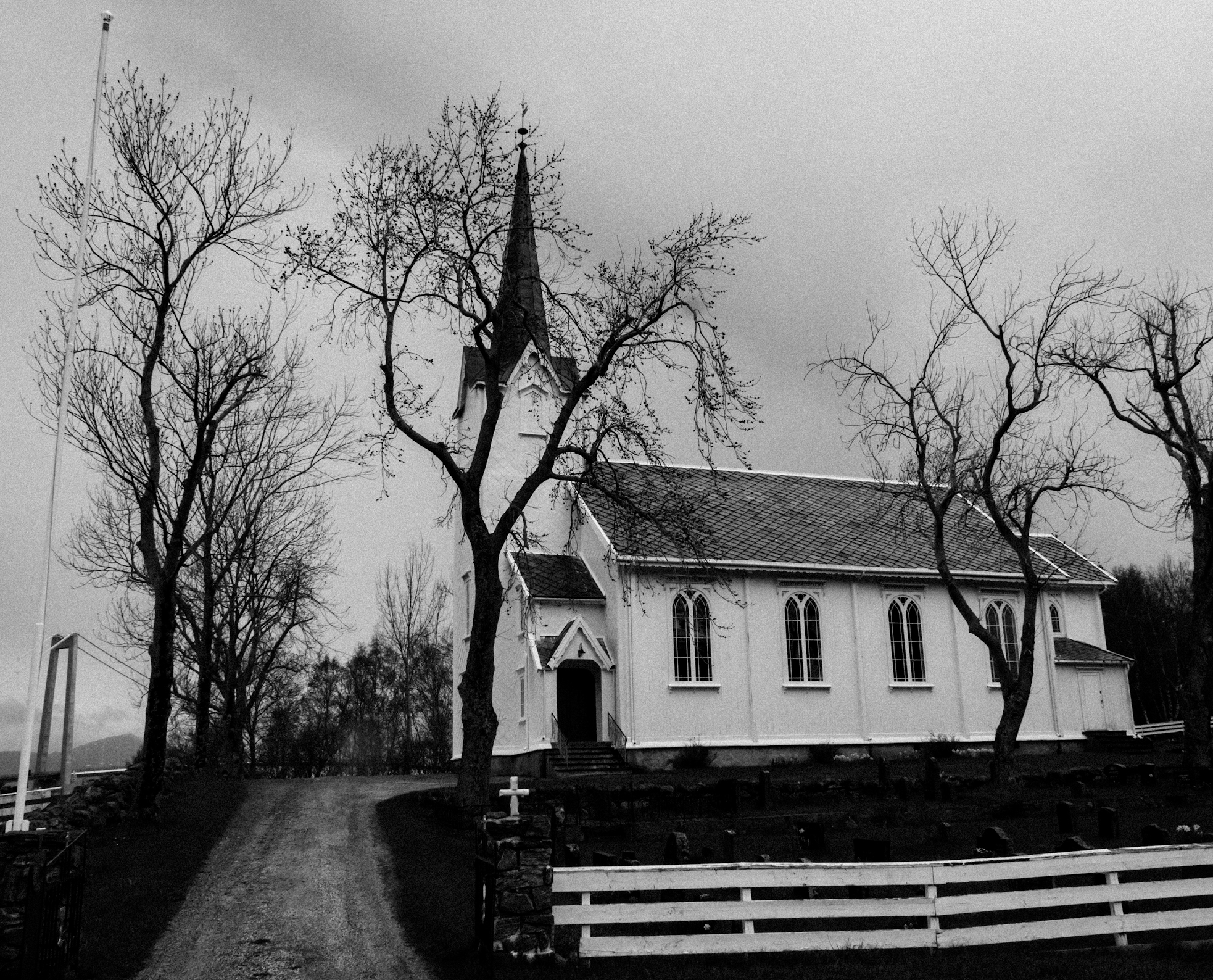
Exterior

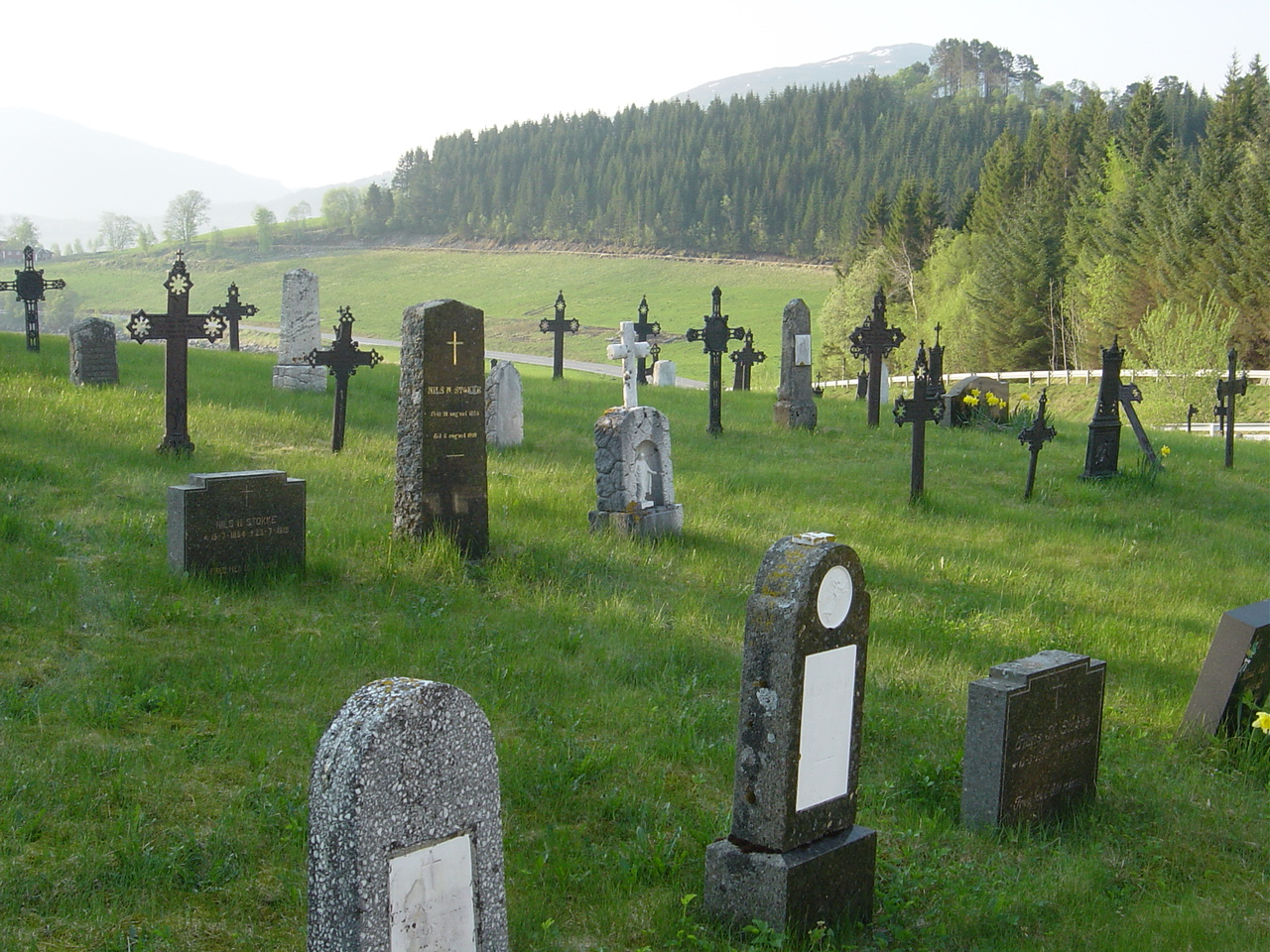
Graveyard

== See also ==
- List of churches in Møre
