= Hordfast =

Planned road project in Norway

Hordfast Hordfast Fixed Link
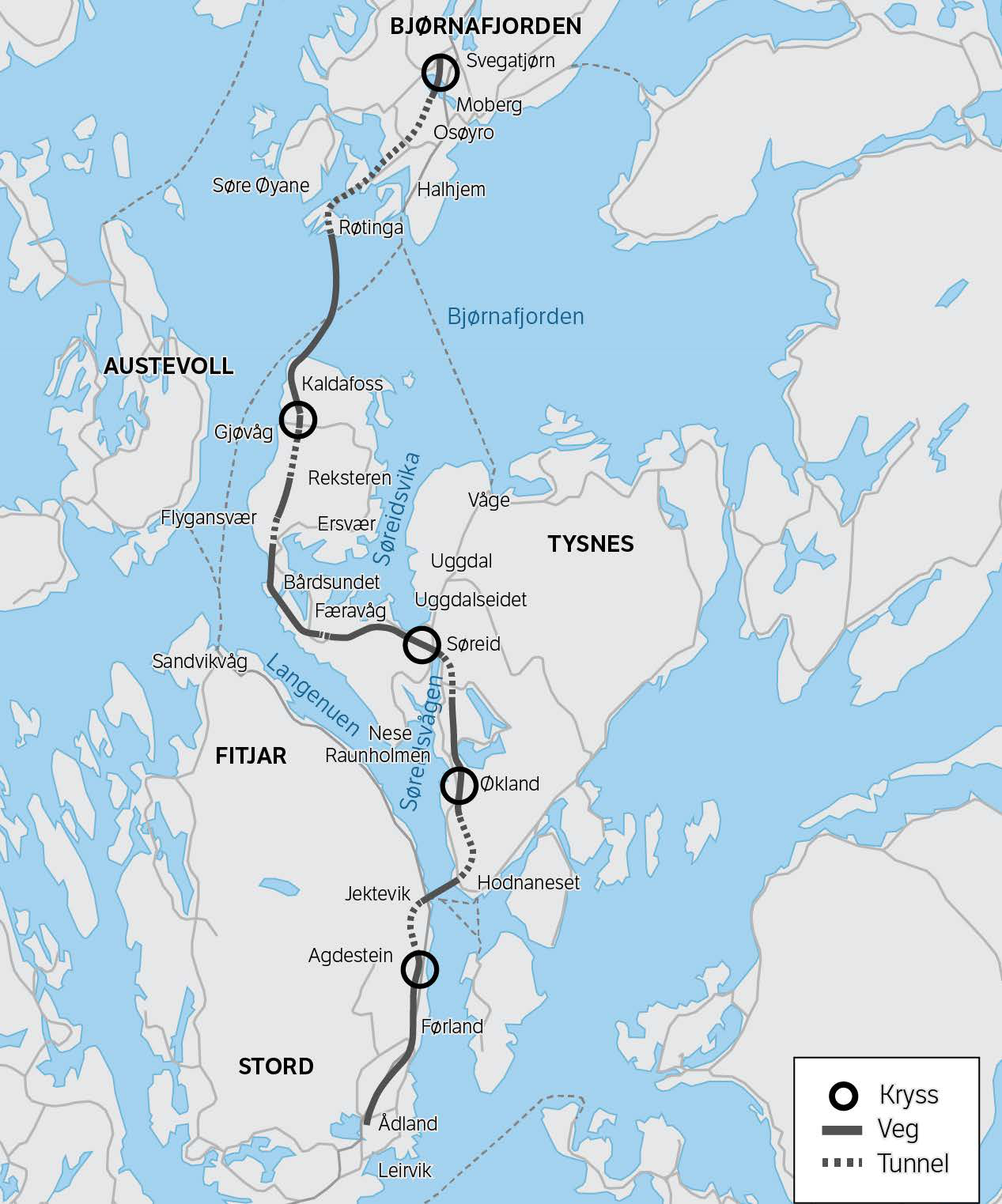

Overview
- Location: Hordland, Norway
- Coordinates: 60°15′00″N 6°00′00″E
- Status: Regulatory planning
- Route: E39
- Start: Halhjem
- End: Jektevik

Operation
- Work began: 2024-2025
- Opens: 2030's
- Operator: Norwegian Public Roads Administration
- Toll: yes

Hordfast or the Hordaland Fixed Link is a planned road project between the mainland city of Bergen and the island of Stord in Vestland county, Norway. Hordfast is the colloquial name for the project since it will connect the islands of Hordaland county with the fastlandet (which is the Norwegian word for "mainland").

This project is one part of the "ferry-free E39" project. It aims to improve the European route E39 highway system so that it will link the west coast cities of Kristiansand - Stavanger - Haugesund - Bergen - Trondheim without the use of any ferries to cross the numerous fjords in the region.

The route is still in the planning and regulatory phases, which is expected to be completed in 2023. Currently there is no estimated opening date, but is anticipated to be completed in the early 2030's in close timing with Rogfast. The completion of both will provide a permanent complete road link between the major cities of Stavanger and Bergen.

== Routes ==
The project has been in the planning stage for several years, and of several options under discussion, one has been chosen as the favoured one. The selected option is a bridge over Bjørnafjorden. This fjord is very deep and would require a floating bridge of world record length, around 5 km(3 mi), allowing ship traffic under. It would be an advanced and fairly rarely used technology, a much bigger version of the Nordhordland Bridge. In 2019 the project was estimated to cost about 20 billion kr. This option would give the shortest driving distance.

The other options considered were via Austevoll Municipality, but it is the most expensive as it requires two long and deep tunnels, both similar to Rogfast. Other options would route the road through Tysnes Municipality (with ferry) or Bjørnafjorden Municipality (a long floating bridge, a detour, no ferry).
