= Buvik Church =

Church in Trøndelag, Norway

- Buvik kirke
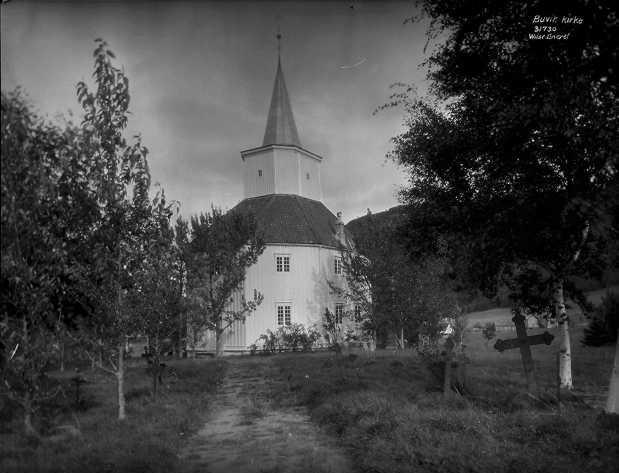
- View of the church
- Buvik Church
- 63.3093975479°N 10.1869936287°E
- Location: Skaun Municipality, Trøndelag
- Country: Norway
- Denomination: Church of Norway
- Churchmanship: Evangelical Lutheran

History
- Status: Parish church
- Founded: 13th century
- Consecrated: Sept 1823

Architecture
- Functional status: Active
- Architectural type: Octagonal
- Completed: 1819 (207 years ago)

Specifications
- Capacity: 250
- Materials: Wood

Administration
- Diocese: Nidaros bispedømme
- Deanery: Orkdal prosti
- Parish: Buvik
- Norwegian Cultural Heritage Site
- Type: Church
- Status: Automatically protected
- ID: 83975

Buvik Church (Norwegian: Buvik kirke) is a parish church of the Church of Norway in Skaun Municipality in Trøndelag county, Norway. It is located in the village of Buvika. It is the church for the Buvik parish which is part of the Orkdal prosti (deanery) in the Diocese of Nidaros. The white, wooden church was built in an octagonal style in 1819 using plans drawn up by an unknown architect. The church seats about 250 people.

== History ==
The earliest existing historical records of the church date back to the 1300s, but the church was likely first built in the 1200s. The first church in Buvik was probably a stave church and it was located about 100 metres (330 ft) southeast of the present church site. Not much is known about the first church building. By the 1600s, this church had fallen into disrepair and was in need of replacement. In 1658, the church was torn down and a new church was built on the same site. In June 1728, large masses of clay and soil slid into the river Vigda, just west of the church. This put the foundations of the church in grave danger in the event that more land was to slide towards the river. The church was emptied out within a few days and then the church was taken down. The following year (1729), the church was rebuilt on a site about 400 metres (1,300 ft) to the northeast in a safer location.

In 1803, the church was said to be in quite poor condition and that the Bishop had ordered a new church to be built. It was several years before this happened. In 1818–1819, a new octagonal church was built about 350 metres (1,150 ft) to the southwest, a short distance north of the medieval church site. The new building was consecrated in September 1823. The church was built by the carpenter Johan Nordset who based the plans off of the nearby Klæbu Church. In 1861, the tower was struck by lightning and it had to be rebuilt. In 1978, a sacristy was built on the east side of the church.

== See also ==
- List of churches in Nidaros
- Octagonal churches in Norway
