= Bergsøya, Gjemnes =

Island in Møre og Romsdal, Norway

Bergsøya
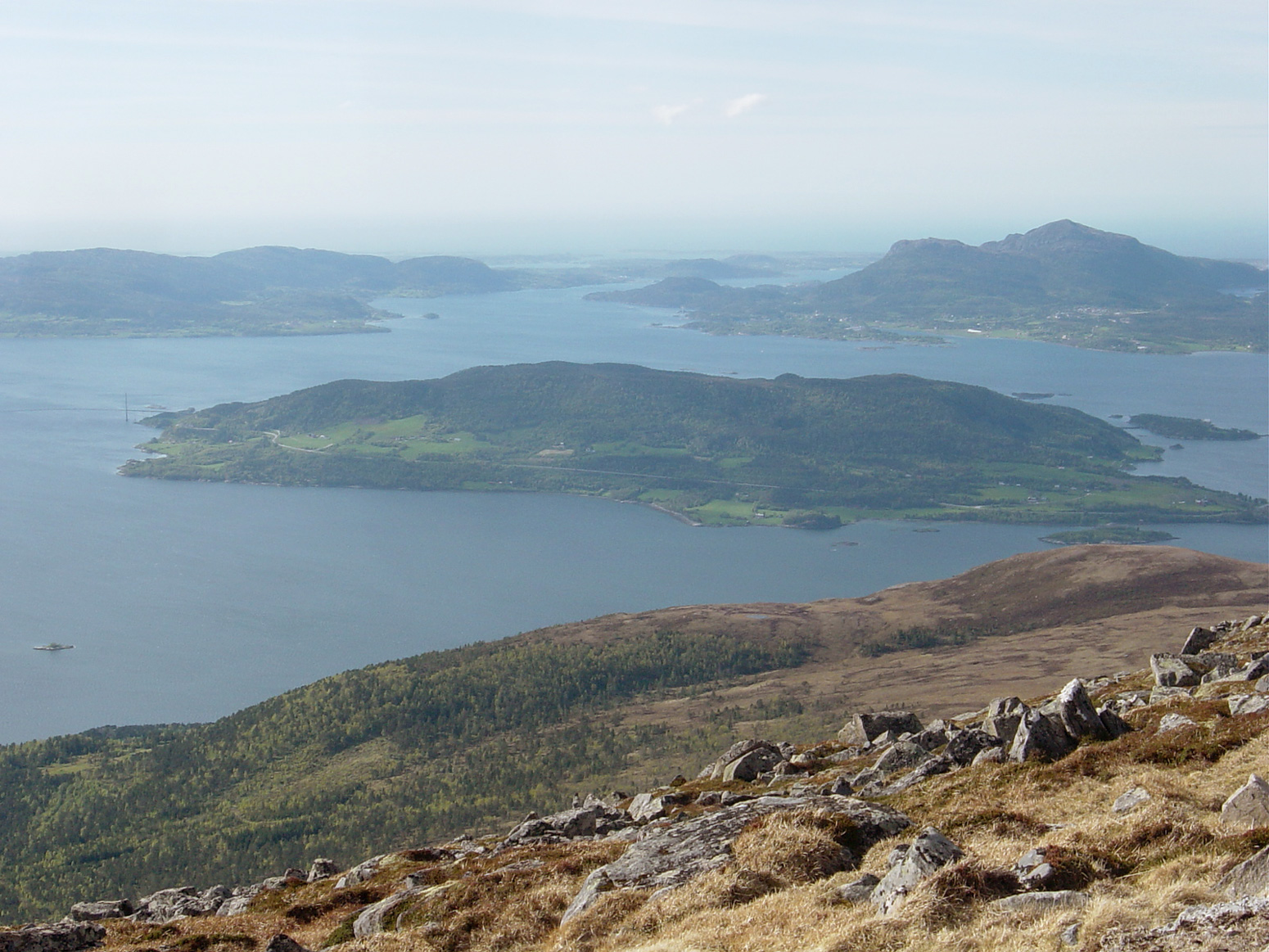
- View of Bergsøya (looking north)
- Interactive map of Bergsøya

Geography
- Location: Møre og Romsdal, Norway
- Coordinates: 62.9794°N 7.8270°E
- Area: 8.8 km^{2} (3.4 sq mi)
- Length: 3 km (1.9 mi)
- Width: 4.5 km (2.8 mi)
- Coastline: 14 km (8.7 mi)
- Highest elevation: 284 m (932 ft)
- Highest point: Brannhaugen

Administration
- Norway
- County: Møre og Romsdal
- Municipality: Gjemnes Municipality

Demographics
- Population: 169 (2015)
- Pop. density: 19.4/km^{2} (50.2/sq mi)

Bergsøya is an island in Gjemnes Municipality in Møre og Romsdal county, Norway. The island is located near the junctions of the Freifjorden, Kvernesfjorden, and Tingvollfjorden. The highest point on the 8.8-square-kilometre (3.4 sq mi) island is the 284-metre (932 ft) tall mountain Brannhaugen.

The island is connected to Kristiansund Municipality (to the north) and the mainland part of Gjemnes Municipality by the Krifast network (a network of 2 bridges and 1 undersea tunnel). It is connected to the mainland in the west by the Gjemnessund Bridge, to the island of Frei (and Kristiansund Municipality) to the north by the Freifjord Tunnel, and to the island of Aspøya in Tingvoll Municipality to the east by the Bergsøysund Bridge. The European route E39 highway runs across the island via the two bridges and Norwegian National Road 70 runs across the island and into the Freifjord Tunnel.

== See also ==
- List of islands of Norway
