= Fløyfjell Tunnel =

Road tunnel in Bergen, Norway

Fløyfjell Tunnel Fløyfjelltunnelen
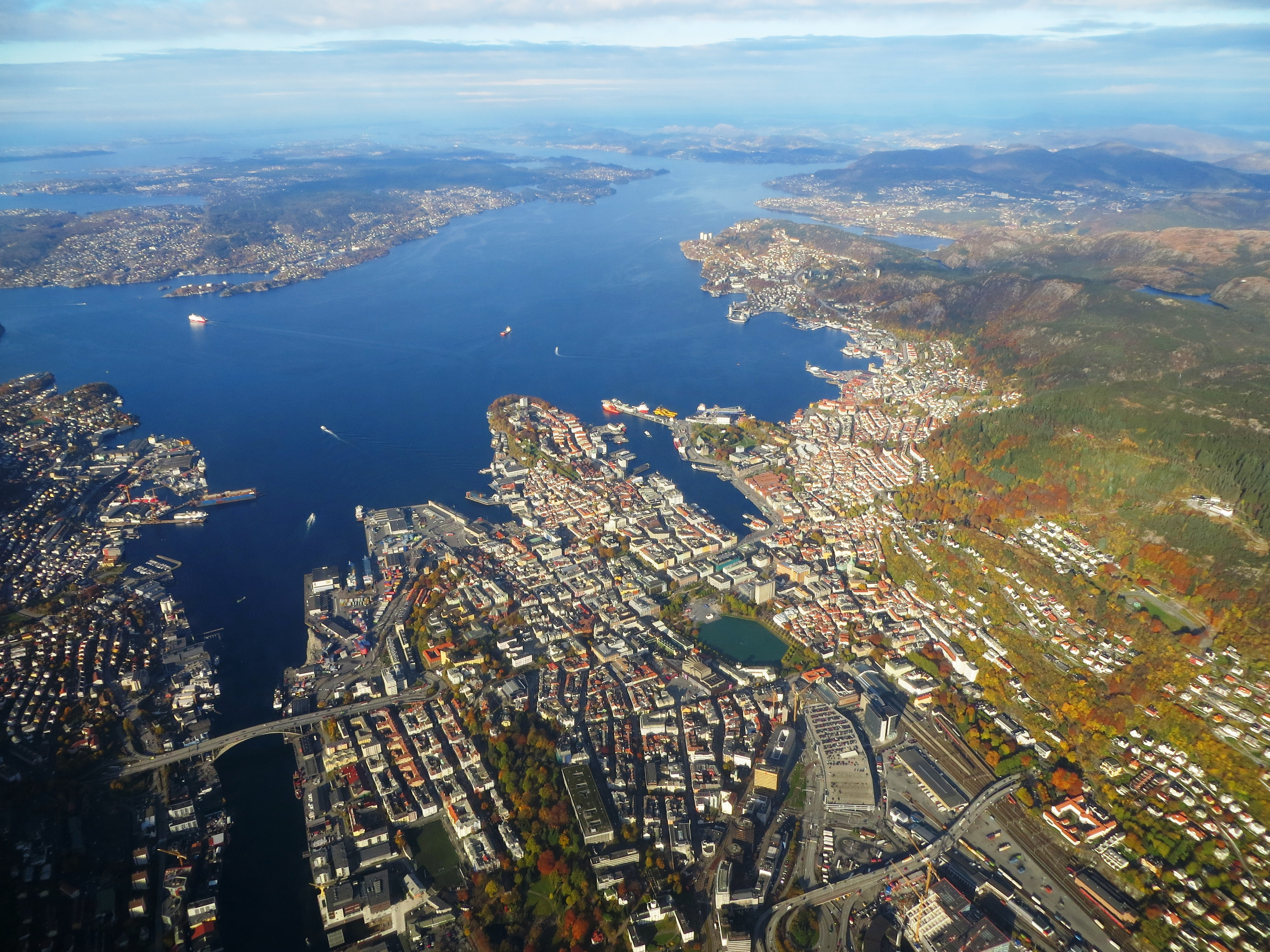
- The entrance to the tunnel is in the lower right part of the picture
- Interactive map of Fløyfjell Tunnel; Fløyfjelltunnelen

Overview
- Location: Vestland, Norway
- Coordinates: 60°24′13″N 5°20′11″E
- Route: E16 / E39

Operation
- Opened: 1989
- Operator: Norwegian Public Roads Administration
- Traffic: 43,189 (2010)

Technical
- Length: 3,825 metres (12,549 ft) (northbound tube) 3,195 metres (10,482 ft) (southbound tube)

The Fløyfjell Tunnel (Norwegian: Fløyfjelltunnelen) is a road tunnel in the city of Bergen in Vestland county, Norway. The tunnel goes through the Fløyfjellet mountain massif between the city neighborhoods of Sandviken and Kalfaret. The tunnel was built to provide a fast route around the city centre.

The twin-tube tunnel was built in the late 1980s as part of the city's motorway network, and is part of the main route between the borough of Åsane and the rest of the city. Each of the tubes carries two lanes of traffic on the European route E39/European route E16. The two tubes differ slightly in length; the southern tube, which carries southbound traffic, is 3.2 kilometres (2.0 mi) long and was opened in 1988, while the northern tube is 3.6 kilometres (2.2 mi) long and was opened the following year.

The traffic through the tunnel is increasing rapidly. In 2007, the average daily traffic was 41,707 vehicles, up from 34,779 vehicles in 2000. The speed cameras in the tunnel detected this section of road to have the most speeding vehicles in all of Vestland county.

== Incidents ==
The Fløyfjell Tunnel has been named the most-frequently closed tunnel in Bergen. During 2010 for example, it was closed a total of 216 times.

In July 2011, a car crash occurred inside the Fløyfjell Tunnel. A man was driving the car south when he crashed into the mountain wall, suffering only minor injuries. The local police were notified by witnesses and arrived promptly, and subsequently closed the tunnel. It remained closed for several days, causing a problem for local residents.
