= Lyshorn Tunnel =

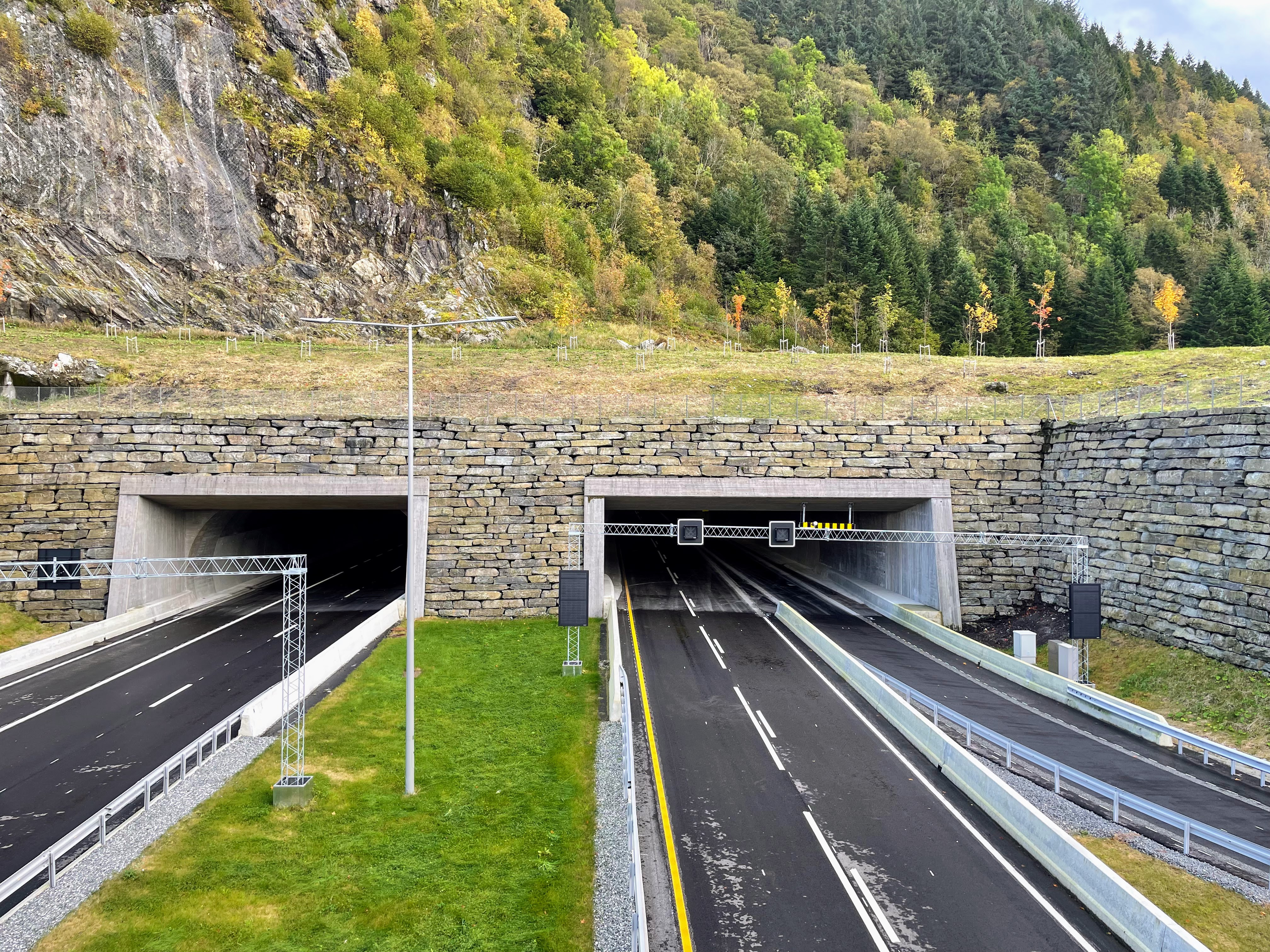
- Interactive map of Lyshorn Tunnel

Overview
- Location: Bjørnafjorden, Bergen - Vestland, Norway
- Route: E39

Operation
- Work began: 2015
- Opened: 2022
- Operator: Norwegian Public Roads Administration
- Character: Motorway

Technical
- Length: 9.3 km (5.8 mi)
- No. of lanes: 2 per tube (four total)
- Operating speed: 100 kilometers per hour (62 mph)

Lyshorn Tunnel (Norwegian: Lyshorntunnelen) is a 9.3-kilometre-long (5.7 mi) motorway tunnel connecting the municipalities of Bergen and Bjørnafjorden in Vestland county, Norway. The tunnel has two tubes with a total of four lanes and a speed limit of 100 km/h. It is the longest motorway tunnel in Norway and is one the four tunnels on the Svegatjørn-Rådal stretch of E39.
