= Aspøya, Tingvoll =

Island in Møre og Romsdal, Norway

Aspøya
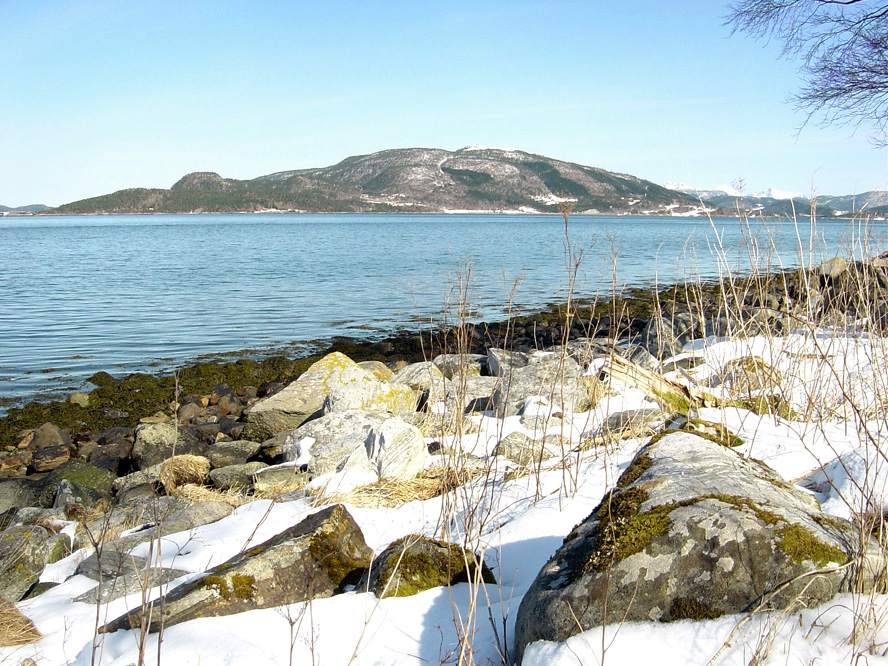
- View of the island
- Interactive map of Aspøya

Geography
- Location: Møre og Romsdal, Norway
- Coordinates: 63.0113°N 7.9253°E
- Area: 18.8 km^{2} (7.3 sq mi)
- Length: 7 km (4.3 mi)
- Width: 4 km (2.5 mi)
- Highest elevation: 372 m (1220 ft)
- Highest point: Vettafjellet

Administration
- Norway
- County: Møre og Romsdal
- Municipality: Tingvoll Municipality

Aspøya is an artificial island in Tingvoll Municipality in Møre og Romsdal county, Norway. It is located between the Freifjorden and the Tingvollfjorden. The European route E39 highway crosses Aspøya and connects it to the nearby island of Bergsøya to the west by the Bergsøysund Bridge–part of the Krifast bridge and tunnel system which connects the town of Kristansund to the mainland. To the east, the E39 highway connects it to the Straumsnes peninsula in Tingvoll.

The highest point on the 18.8-square-kilometre (7.3 sq mi) island is the 372-metre (1,220 ft) mountain Vettafjellet. The artificial island was once a peninsula that was connected to the mainland by the narrow, 150-metre (490 ft) wide Nålsundeidet isthmus. In 1905, the isthmus was excavated to provide an 8-metre (26 ft) wide canal through which boats can travel. The completion of the canal, therefore, made Aspøya into an island.

== See also ==
- List of islands of Norway
