= Nypan, Norway =

Village in Trondheim Municipality, Norway

Nypan
- Village
- Interactive map of Nypan
- Location within Trøndelag Location within Norway
- Coordinates: 63.33039°N 10.30879°E
- Country: Norway
- Region: Central Norway
- County: Trøndelag
- Municipality: Trondheim Municipality
- Borough: Heimdal

Area
  - Total: 0.56 km^{2} (0.22 sq mi)
- Elevation: 51 m (167 ft)

Population (2024)
  - Total: 903
  - Density: 1,613/km^{2} (4,180/sq mi)
- Time zone: UTC+01:00 (CET)
  - Summer (DST): UTC+02:00 (CEST)
- Post Code: 7083 Leinstrand

Nypan is a village in Trondheim Municipality in Trøndelag county, Norway. The village is located just east of the river Nidelva, about 5 kilometres (3.1 mi) north of the village of Melhus and about 12 kilometres (7.5 mi) south of the city of Trondheim. Leinstrand Church is located between Nypan and Klett.

The 0.56-square-kilometre (140-acre) village has a population (2024) of 903 and a population density of 1,613 inhabitants per square kilometre (4,180/sq mi).
