= Norwegian County Road 44 =

Road in Norway

County Road 44
- Bokmål: Fylkesvei 44; Nynorsk: Fylkesveg 44
- Location in Western Norway

Major junctions
- North end: Stavanger, Rogaland
- South end: Flekkefjord, Agder

Location
- Country: Norway

Highway system
- Roads in Norway; National Roads; County Roads

County Road 44 (Norwegian: Fylkesvei 44) is a county road which runs from the town of Flekkefjord in Agder county to the city of Stavanger in Rogaland county. The section of the road between Søyland and Ogna in Hå Municipality has, together with almost all of County Road 507, been designated as National Tourist Routes for the landscape of Jæren. The route follows the North Sea coastline of south-western Norway, and passes mile long beaches, some of Norway's best tended farmlands with its typical dry stone walls, some notable lighthouses and other buildings of cultural significance.
