= Gjemnessund Bridge =

Gjemnessund Bridge Gjemnessundbrua
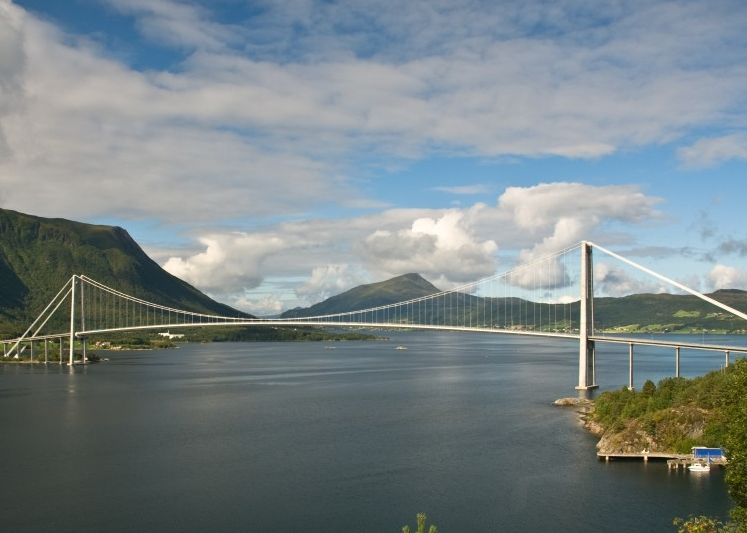
- View of the bridge from Gjemnes village
- Coordinates: 62°58′13″N 7°46′44″E
- Carries: E39
- Crosses: Gjemnessundet
- Locale: Gjemnes Municipality, Møre og Romsdal, Norway

Characteristics
- Design: Suspension bridge
- Total length: 1,257 metres (4,124 ft)
- Height: 108 metres (354 ft)
- Longest span: 623 metres (2,044 ft)
- No. of spans: 21
- Clearance below: 43 metres (141 ft)

History
- Opened: 1992

Location
- Interactive map of Gjemnessund Bridge

The Gjemnessund Bridge (Norwegian: Gjemnessundbrua) is a suspension bridge that crosses the Gjemnessundet strait between the mainland and the island of Bergsøya in Gjemnes Municipality in Møre og Romsdal county, Norway. The 1,257-metre-long (4,124 ft) bridge was the longest suspension bridge in Norway until the opening of the Hardanger Bridge in 2013, although it did not have the longest span (623 metres or 2,044 feet), being eclipsed by the Askøy Bridge.

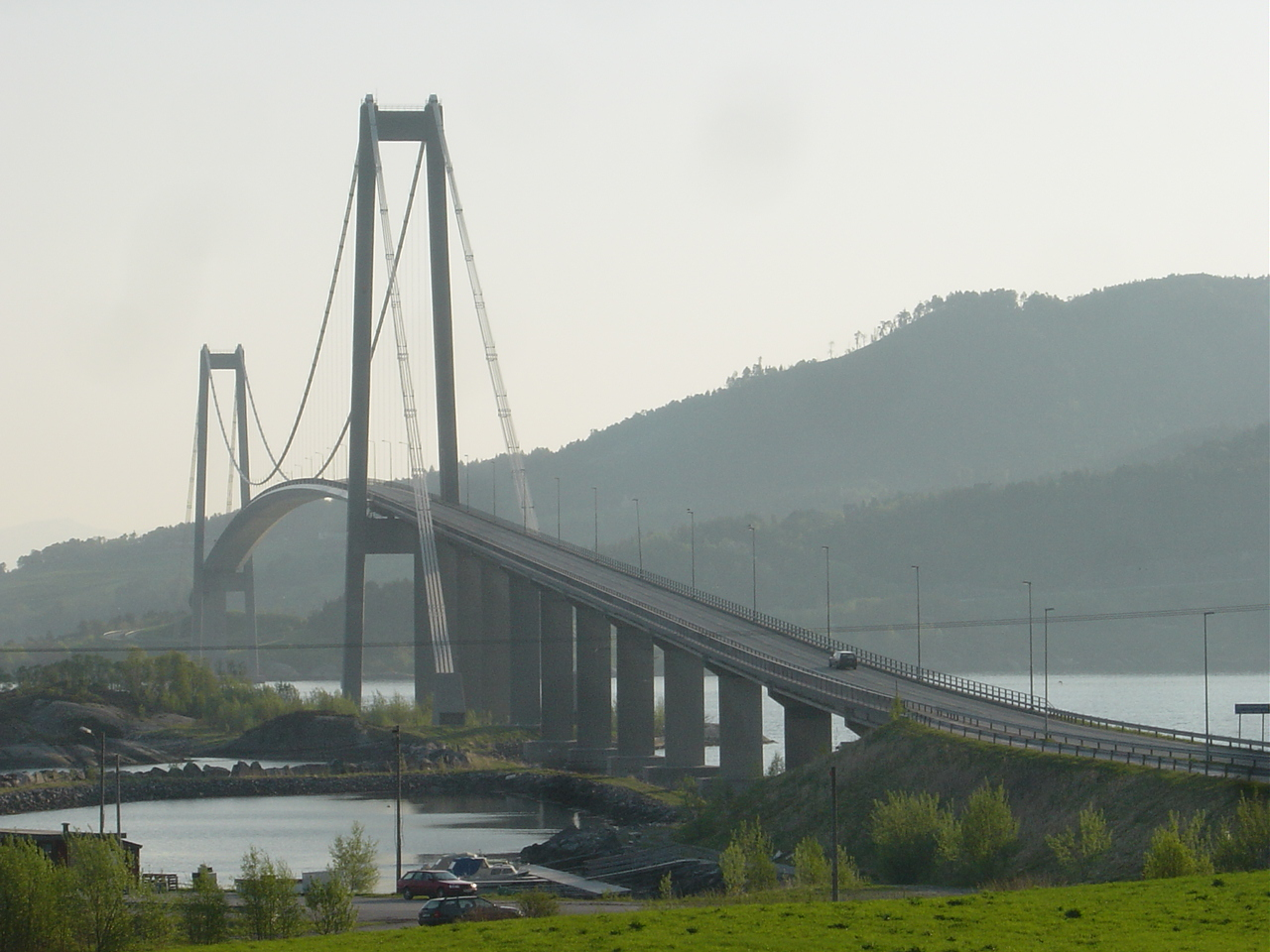
Gjemnessund Bridge

Gjemnessund Bridge was opened in 1992, and has 21 spans with a maximum clearance to the sea of 43 metres (141 ft). It was built as part of the Krifast project, the mainland road connection of the city of Kristiansund (along with the Freifjord Tunnel and the Bergsøysund Bridge).

Many bridges slowly deteriorate and need to be repaired because the salty seawater damages the concrete and the iron inside it. The Gjemnessund Bridge has had a problem with seabirds, whose manure contain salt and ammonia. The salt and ammonia damages the concrete. To prevent this, the bridge is cleaned, and the critical parts of the concrete are covered with an elastic membrane that protects the concrete against the manure and the harmful content.
