= Klett (Norway) =

Village in Trondheim Municipality, Norway

- Village
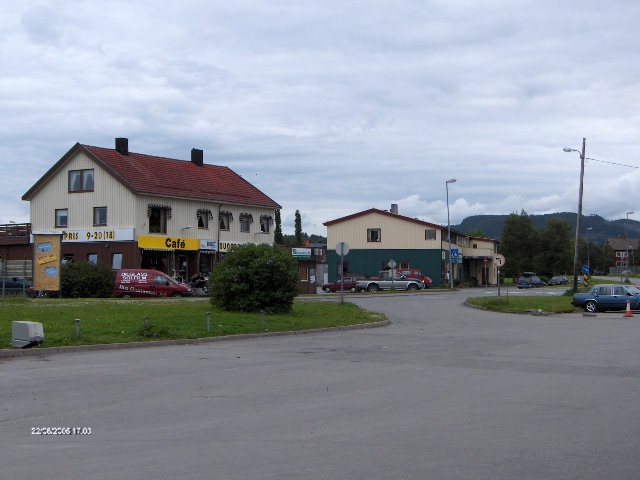
- View of the village
- Interactive map of Klett
- Location within Trøndelag Location within Norway
- Coordinates: 63.3258°N 10.3067°E
- Country: Norway
- Region: Central Norway
- County: Trøndelag
- Municipality: Trondheim Municipality
- Borough: Heimdal
- Elevation: 30 m (98 ft)
- Time zone: UTC+01:00 (CET)
  - Summer (DST): UTC+02:00 (CEST)
- Post Code: 7083 Leinstrand

Klett is a small village in Trondheim Municipality in Trøndelag county, Norway. The village is located in the borough of Heimdal and it is considered a part of the larger village of Nypan by Statistics Norway. The village of Tiller lies to the northeast, the Byneset area lies to the west, and the village of Melhus lies to the south. Most of the area surrounding the village is farmland.

== Klett Crossing ==
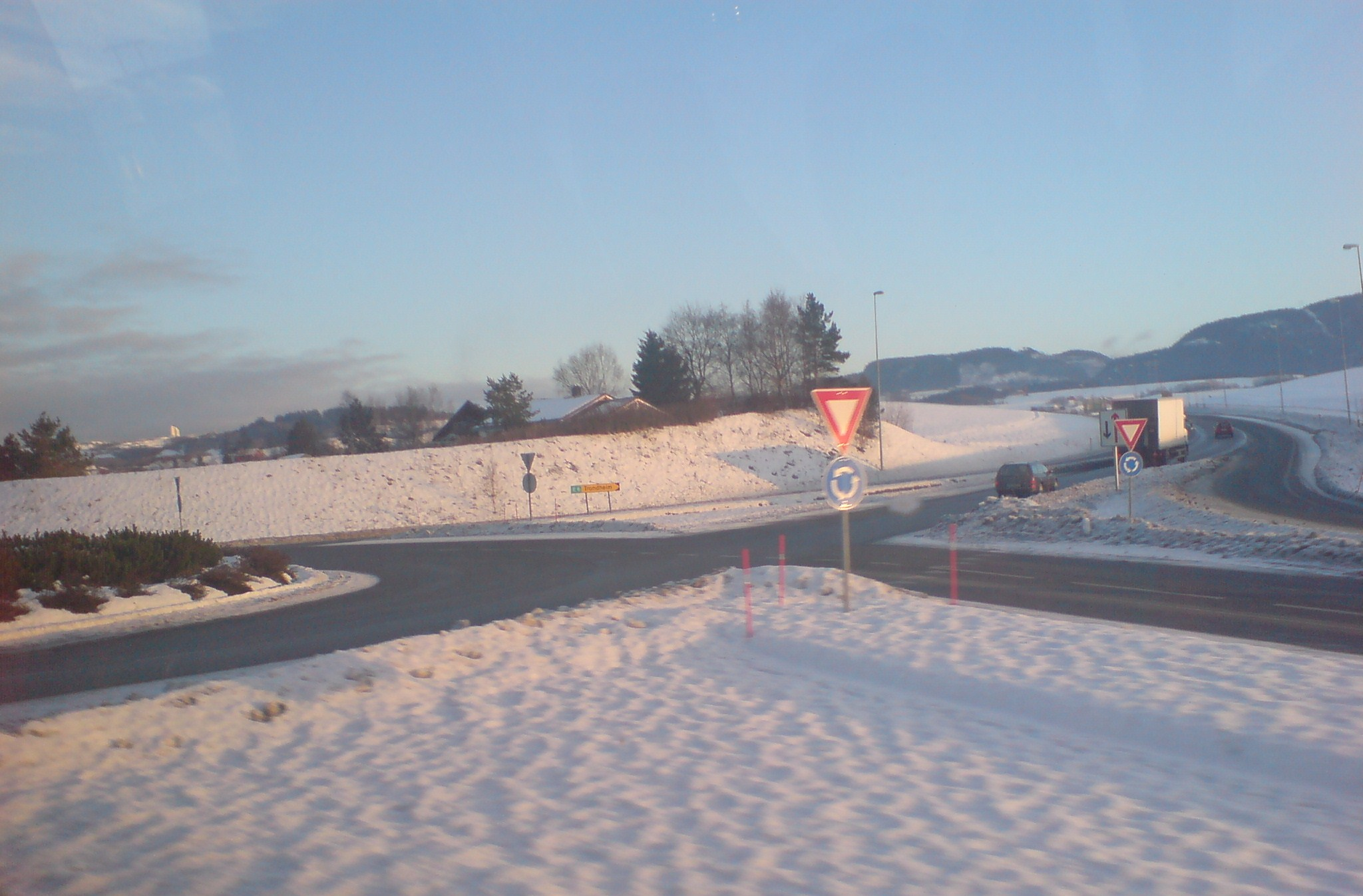
Klett Crossing

To the south of Klett is the junction called Klett Crossing (Norwegian: Klettkrysset) where the European route E06 and European route E39 highways intersect. The roundabout was built in 1988. It is the site of the most traffic accidents in all of the old Sør-Trøndelag county. It was also long famous for being the only roundabout in Norway with yellow road-signs. This was a test by the Norwegian road administration, inspired by Sweden.

A renovation of the intersection is scheduled with a startup during summer 2019 and an estimated completion during winter 2020.
