= Freifjorden =

Fjord in Nordmøre, Norway

- Interactive map of the fjord
- Location: Møre og Romsdal county, Norway
- Coordinates: 63.0466°N 7.8862°E
- Type: Fjord
- Primary inflows: Tingvollfjorden
- Primary outflows: Kvernesfjorden, Vinjefjorden
- Basin countries: Norway
- Max. length: 14 kilometres (8.7 mi)

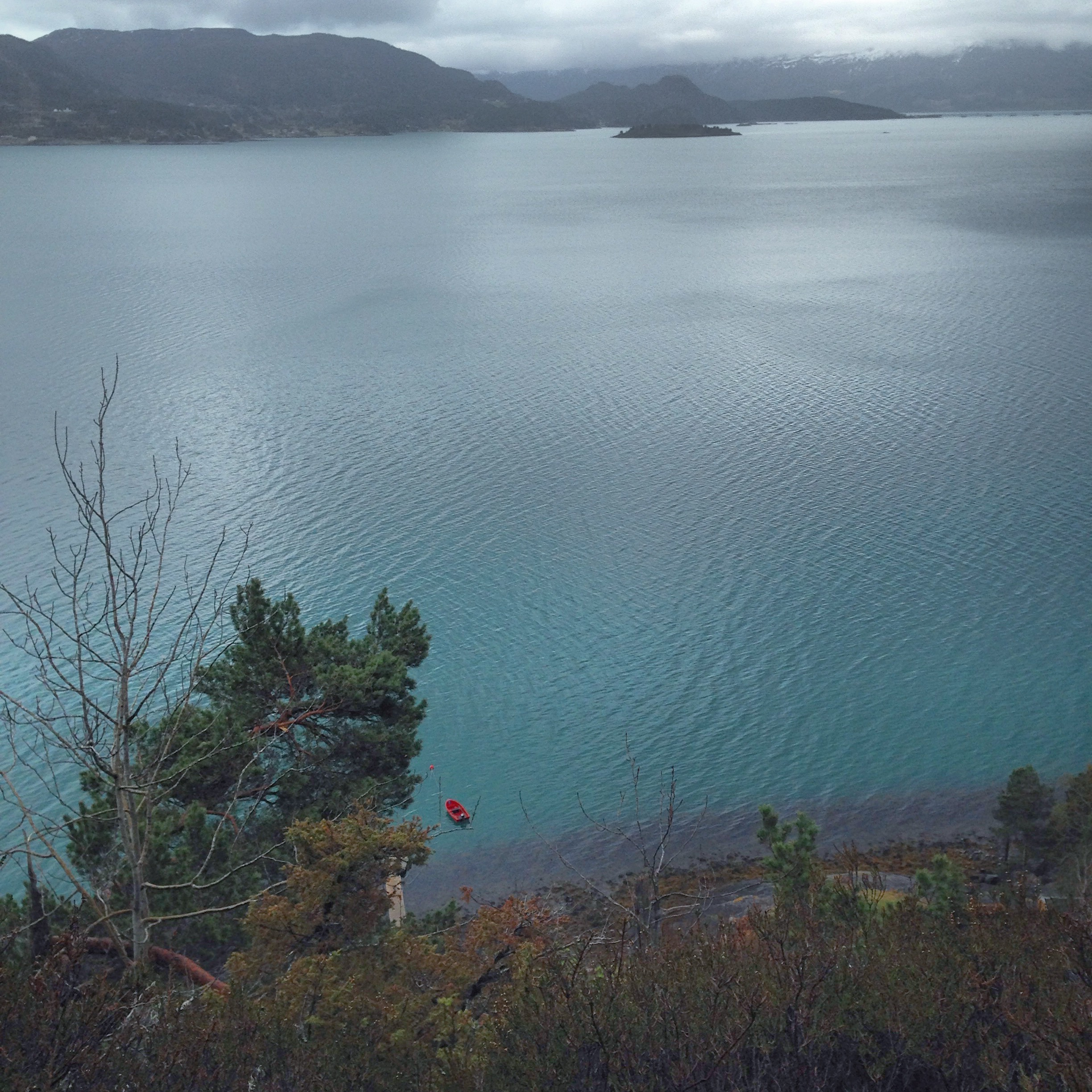

Freifjorden is a fjord in Møre og Romsdal county, Norway. The 14-kilometre (8.7 mi) long fjord flows through Kristiansund Municipality, Tingvoll Municipality, and Gjemnes Municipality. The fjord begins near the island of Tustna and flows southwest between the islands of Nordlandet and Frei on the west side and the mainland peninsula of Straumsnes and the islands of Aspøya and Bergsøya on the east side. The Kvernesfjorden lies at the west end of the Freifjorden, near the Freifjord Tunnel. The villages of Nedre Frei and Kvalvåg are located on the western shore of the fjord.

== See also ==
- List of Norwegian fjords
