= Bergsøysund Bridge =

Bergsøysund Bridge Bergsøysundbrua
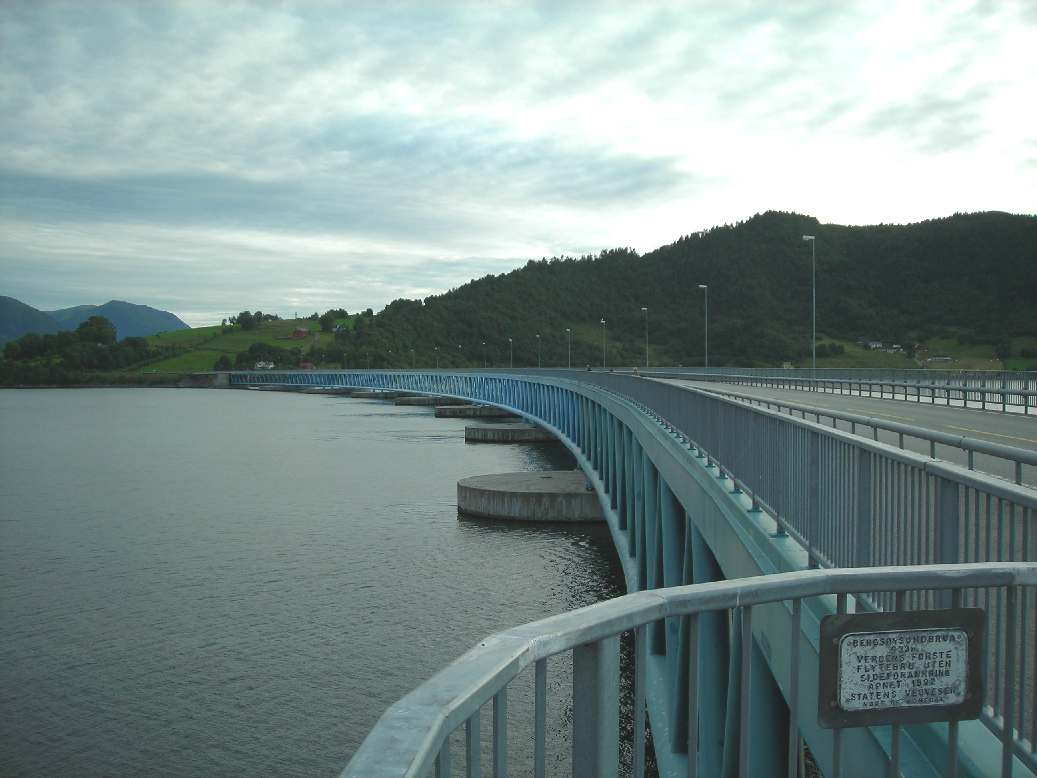
- View of the Bergsøysund Bridge
- Coordinates: 62°59′13″N 7°52′28″E
- Carries: E39
- Crosses: Bergsøysundet
- Locale: Møre og Romsdal, Norway

Characteristics
- Design: Pontoon Bridge
- Total length: 931 metres (3,054 ft)
- Longest span: 106 metres (348 ft)
- No. of spans: 13
- Clearance below: 6 metres (20 ft)

History
- Opened: 1992

Location
- Interactive map of Bergsøysund Bridge

The Bergsøysund Bridge (Norwegian: Bergsøysundbrua) is a pontoon bridge that crosses the Bergsøysundet strait between the islands of Aspøya (in Tingvoll Municipality) and Bergsøya (in Gjemnes Municipality) in Møre og Romsdal county, Norway. The bridge is 931 metres (3,054 ft) long, the longest span is 106 metres (348 ft), and the maximum clearance to the sea is 6 metres (20 ft). The bridge has 13 spans.

Bergsøysund Bridge was opened in 1992. It is part of the Krifast system, the town of Kristiansund's road connection to the mainland. The bridge cost 277.4 million kr.

== Construction ==
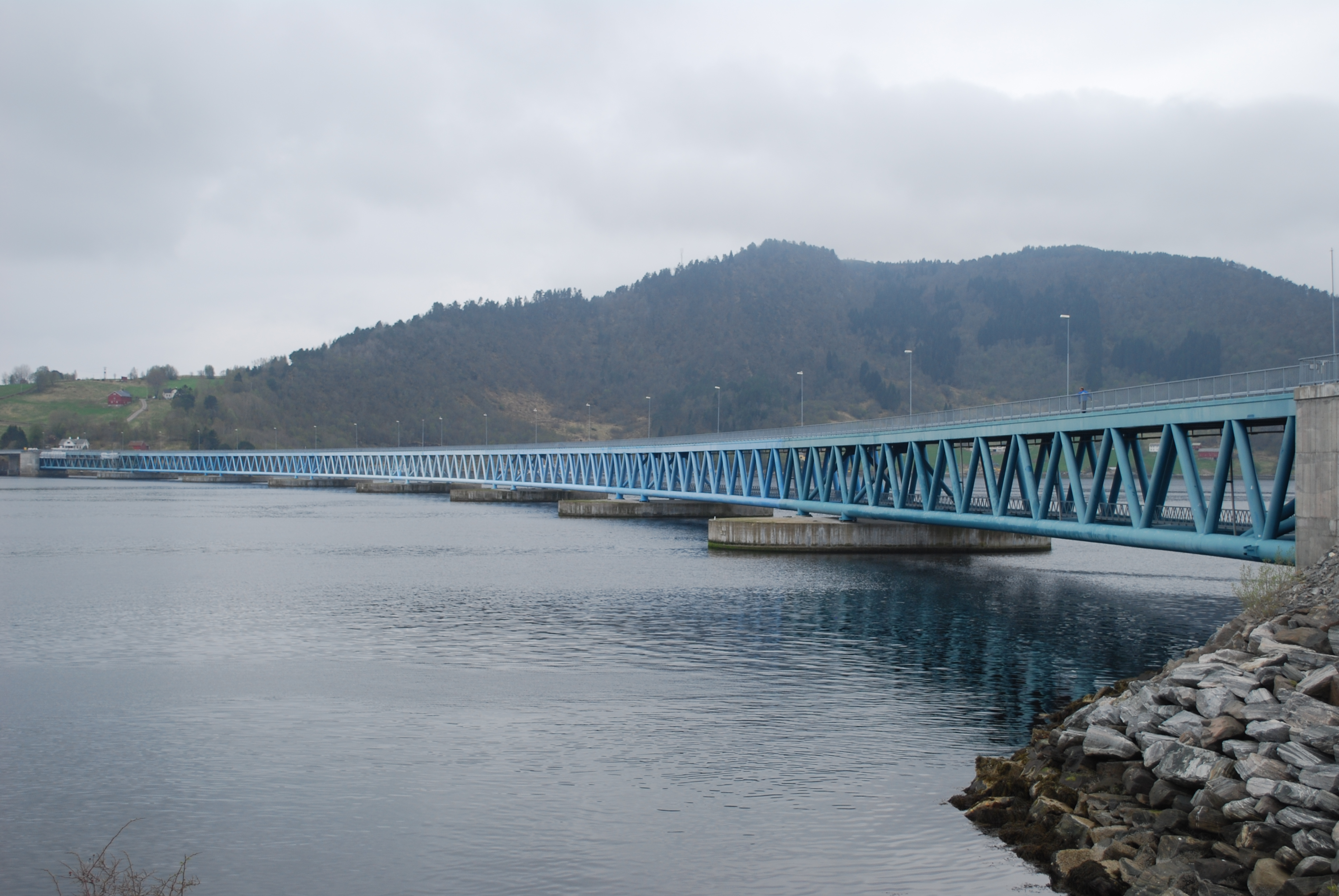
Side view

Pontoon bridge construction has a long history in military and civilian applications on every continent except Antarctica. According to the engineers who designed this bridge, it was designed using recent American technology for floating bridges, combined with Norwegian technology for offshore platforms. The bridge designers researched other bridges in the world and traveled to the state of Washington in the United States to visit the Homer M. Hadley Memorial Bridge and the Hood Canal Bridge—two floating bridges. The continuous floating concrete structure used in the Washington bridges was ultimately ruled out in favor of the discrete floating concrete pier design. This design afforded: 1) an elevated roadway that reduced traffic hazards in storms, 2) a reduction in corrosion of the bridge deck, and 3) improved passage of water beneath the bridge thereby supporting native species.

== See also ==
- List of bridges in Norway
- List of bridges in Norway by length
- List of bridges
- List of bridges by length
- Gjemnessund Bridge
- Straumsund Bridge
