= European route E39 =

Road in trans-European E-road network

E39

Route information
- Length: 1,330 km (830 mi)

Major junctions
- North end: Klett, Norway
- South end: Aalborg, Denmark

Location
- Countries: Norway; Denmark

Highway system
- International E-road network; A Class; B Class

European route E39 is the designation of a 1,330-kilometre (830 mi) north–south road in Norway and Denmark from Klett, just south of Trondheim, to Aalborg via Bergen, Stavanger and Kristiansand. In total, there are nine ferries, more than any other single road in Europe.

In Trondheim, there are connections to E6 and E14; in Ålesund, to E136, in Bergen to E16, in Haugesund, to E134, in Kristiansand to E18, and in Aalborg to E45.

== Norwegian part ==
Route of E39 shown on the map of Western/Southern Norway

In Norway, the E39 is part of the country's national road system, with its development and maintenance falling under the jurisdiction of the public roads administration. The E39 is mostly a two-lane undivided road, and only relatively short sections near Stavanger, Trondheim, and Bergen are motorways or semi-motorways.

=== Trøndelag county ===
Trondheim Municipality

- E6 towards Oslo and Trondheim
- Fv707 Klett junction

Melhus Municipality

- Semi-motorway Øysand-Thamshavn/Orkanger (22 km)

Skaun Municipality

- Brekk Tunnel (1,290 metres (4,230 ft))
- Mannsfjell Tunnel (1,790 metres (5,870 ft))
- Viggja Tunnel (2,730 metres (8,960 ft))
- Fv709 Skaun
- Storsand Tunnel (3,670 metres (12,040 ft))

Orkland Municipality

- Fv65 Orkanger towards Surnadal Municipality
- Fv714 Gagnåsvatnet towards Hitra Municipality and Frøya Municipality

Heim Municipality

- Fv680 Vinjeøra towards Kyrksæterøra
- Valsøy Bridge (380 metres (1,250 ft))
- Fv65 Betna towards Surnadal Municipality
- Ferry from Halsa to Kanestraum in Tingvoll (20 minutes, fee)

=== Møre og Romsdal county ===
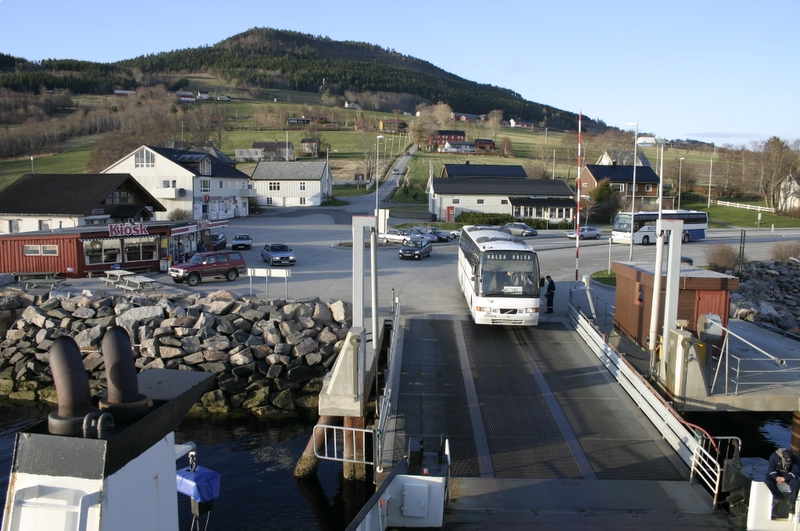
Halsa ferry dock

Tingvoll Municipality

- Rv70 towards Oppdal Municipality
- Bergsøysund Bridge (931 metres (3,054 ft))

Gjemnes Municipality

- Rv70 towards Kristiansund Municipality
- Gjemnessund Bridge (1,257 metres (4,124 ft) length, 623 metres (2,044 ft) span)

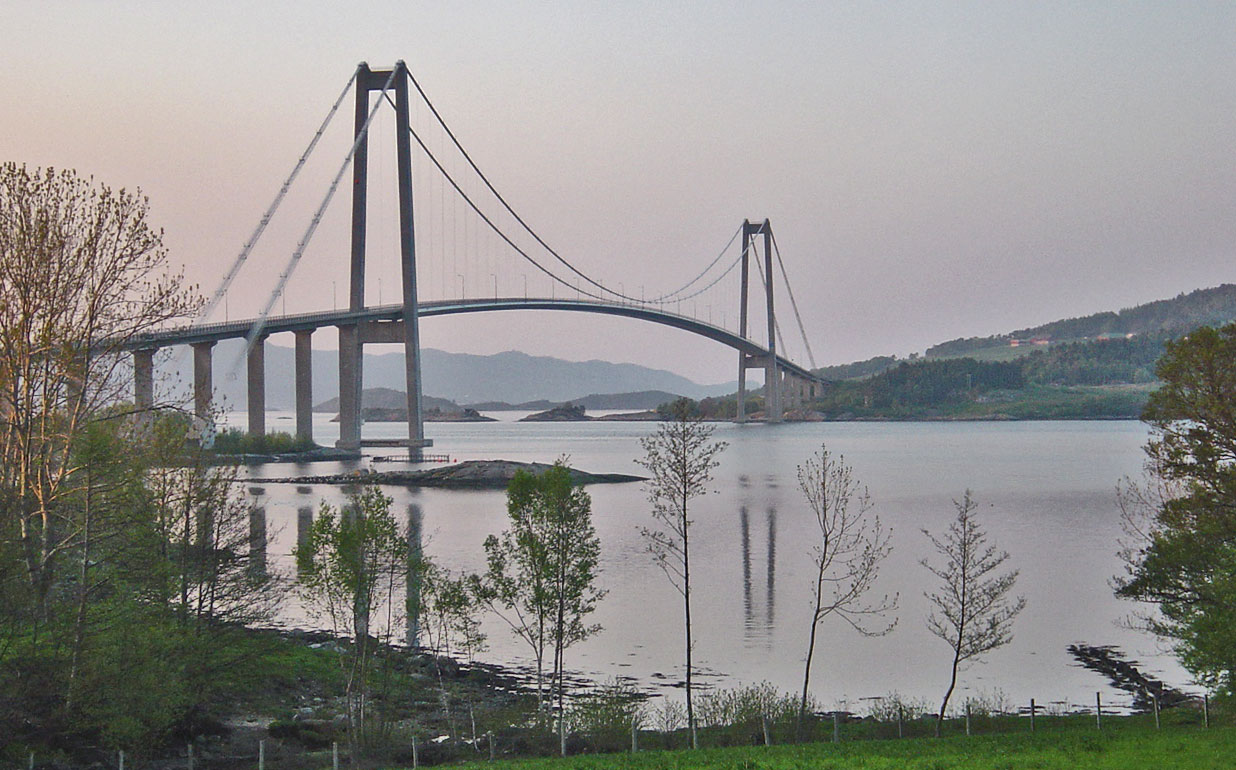
Gjemnessund Bridge

Molde Municipality

- Fv62 towards Sunndalsøra
- Semi-motorway Hjelset - Lønset (9 km)
- Hjelset toll station
- ←Molde Airport, Årø Fv64 →Eide, Elnesvågen
- Fv64→ Fannefjordstunnelen direction Åndalsnes
- Ferry from Molde to Vestnes (35 minutes, 2 departures per hour, fee)

Vestnes Municipality

- E136 at Skorgenes, jointly with E39 until Spjelkavik

Ålesund Municipality

- Fv650 Sjøholt → Linge ferry dock and Geiranger
- E136 at Spjelkavika, jointly with E39 from Skorgenes at Tresfjord

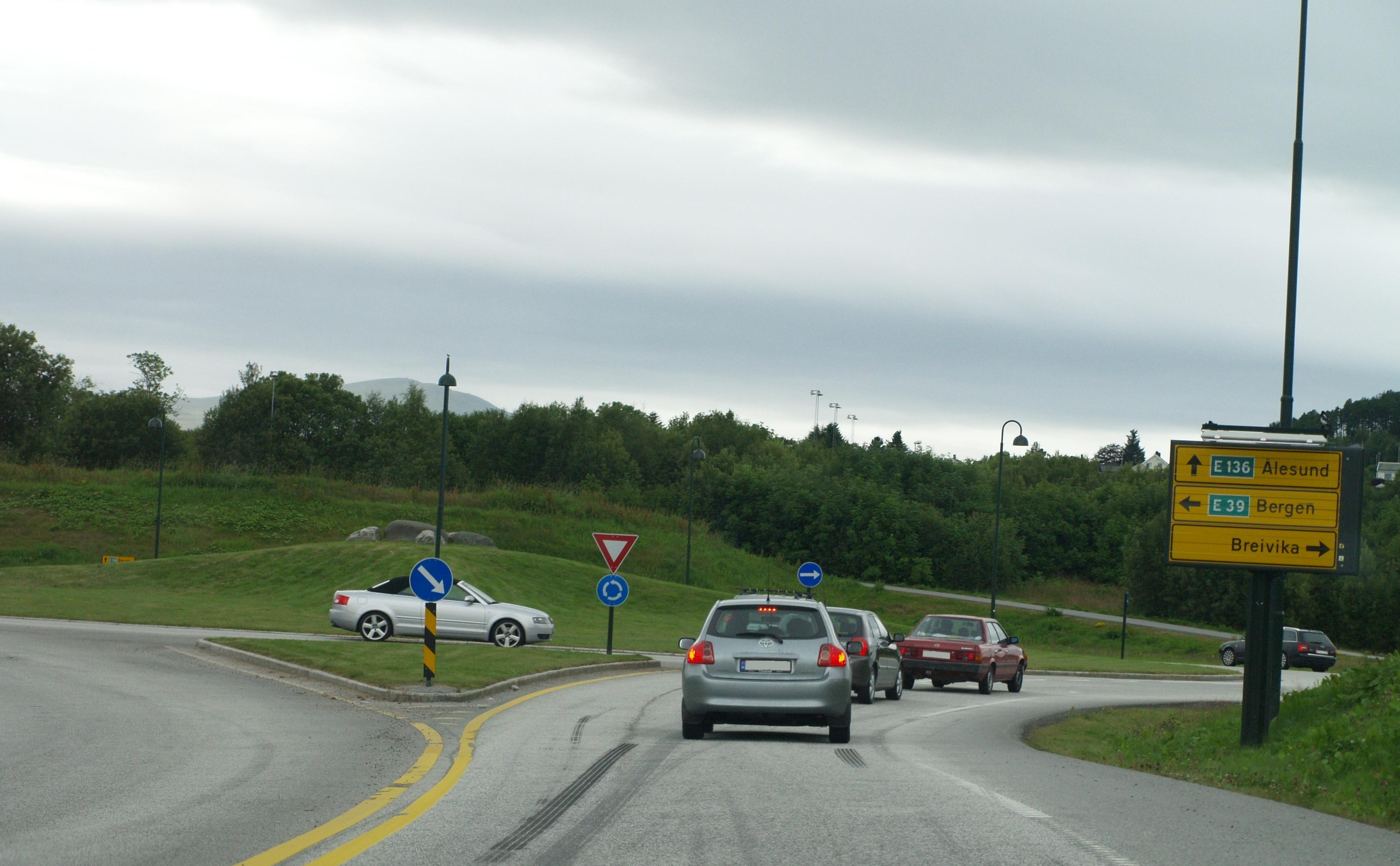
Roundabout in Ålesund

Sula Municipality

- Fv61 towards Hareid Municipality
- Ferry from Solavågen to Festøya in Ørsta (20 minutes, 2 departures per hour, fee)

Ørsta Municipality

- Fv655 Ørsta

Volda Municipality

- Fv653 Furene → Eiksund tunnel
- Rv651 to Volda-Folkestad
- Rotsethorn Tunnel (4,309 metres (14,137 ft))
- Hjartåberg Tunnel (3,504 metres (11,496 ft))
- Fyrdsberg Tunnel (1,185 metres (3,888 ft))
- Eidsnakk Tunnel (1,632 metres (5,354 ft))
- Kviven Tunnel (6,490 metres (21,290 ft))
- Fv60 to Hellesylt and Stranda Municipality

=== Vestland county ===
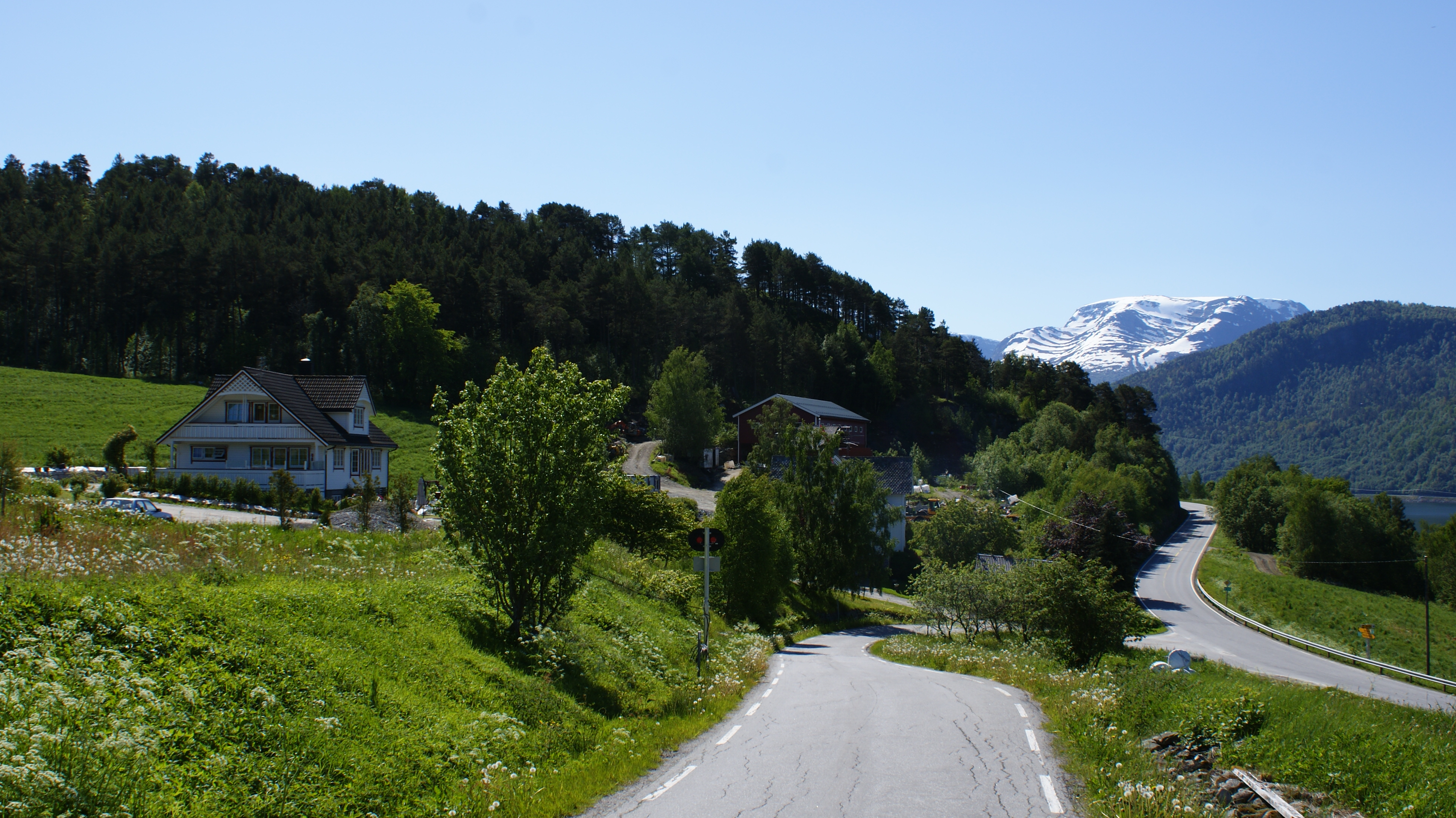
E39 bend at Anda near Sandane Airport

Stad Municipality

- Kongenestunnelen (1120 m) and Breisvortunnelen (1380 m)
- Rv15 at Leivdøla bridge, jointly with E39 until Nordfjordeid
- Rv651 to Folkestad-Volda
- Rv15 at Nordfjordeid to Måløy
- Lotetunnelen 2,857 metres (9,373 ft)

Gloppen Municipality

- Ferry from Lote to Anda (10 min, 1–2 departures per hour, fee)

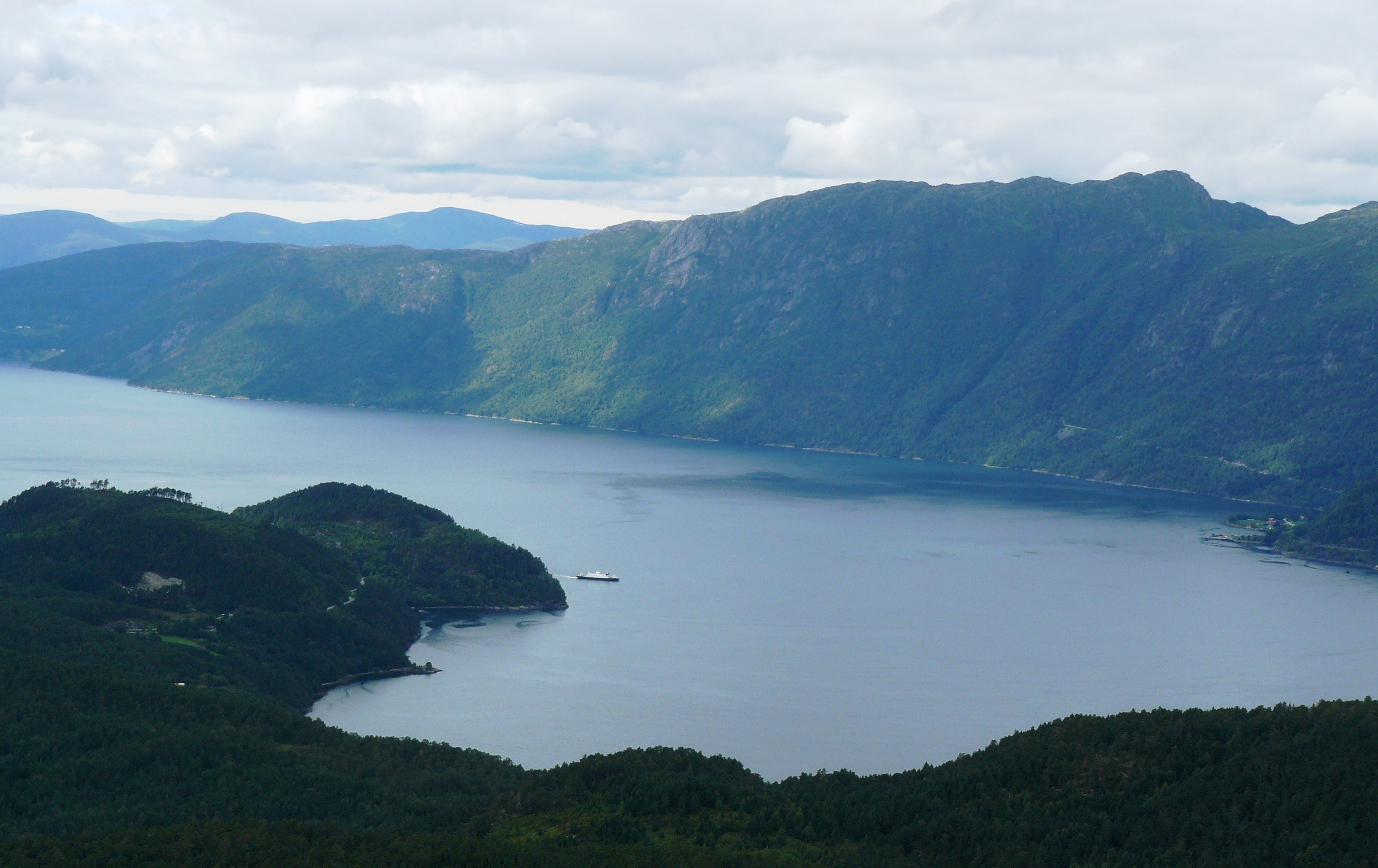
Nordfjord and E39 ferry Lote-Anda

- Kleberget tunnel 126 metres (413 ft) under the Sandane Airport runway
- Fv615 at Sandane
- Fv60 at Byrkjelo

Sunnfjord Municipality

- Rv5 jointly with E39 from Skei to Førde
- Fv613 at Moskog to Balestrand over Gaularfjellet
- Toll into Førde
- to Førde hospital
- Rv5 Førde
- Toll into Førde
- Fv57 at Espeland to Førde airport
- Fv610 at Sande to Dale and Askvoll westbound or to Gaularfjellet eastbound

Høyanger Municipality

- Fv55 at Vadheim
- Bogstunnelen 3,482 metres (11,424 ft)
- Noreviktunnelen 2,591 metres (8,501 ft)
- Lavik
- ferry from Lavik to Ytre Oppedal (20 min, 1–2 departures per hour, fee)

Gulen Municipality

- Ytre Oppedal
- Skrikebergtunnelen 1,500 metres (4,900 ft)
- Jernfjelltunnelen 2,391 metres (7,844 ft)

Masfjorden Municipality

- Matreberg Tunnel 1,352 metres (4,436 ft)
- Masfjord Tunnel 4,110 metres (13,480 ft)

Alver Municipality

- Eikefet Tunnel 4,910 metres (16,110 ft)
- 3 toll stations at Mundalsberget, Flatøy and Åsane
- Mundalsberg Tunnel 1,085 metres (3,560 ft)
- Fv57 at Knarvik
- Hagelsund Bridge 623 metres (2,044 ft)

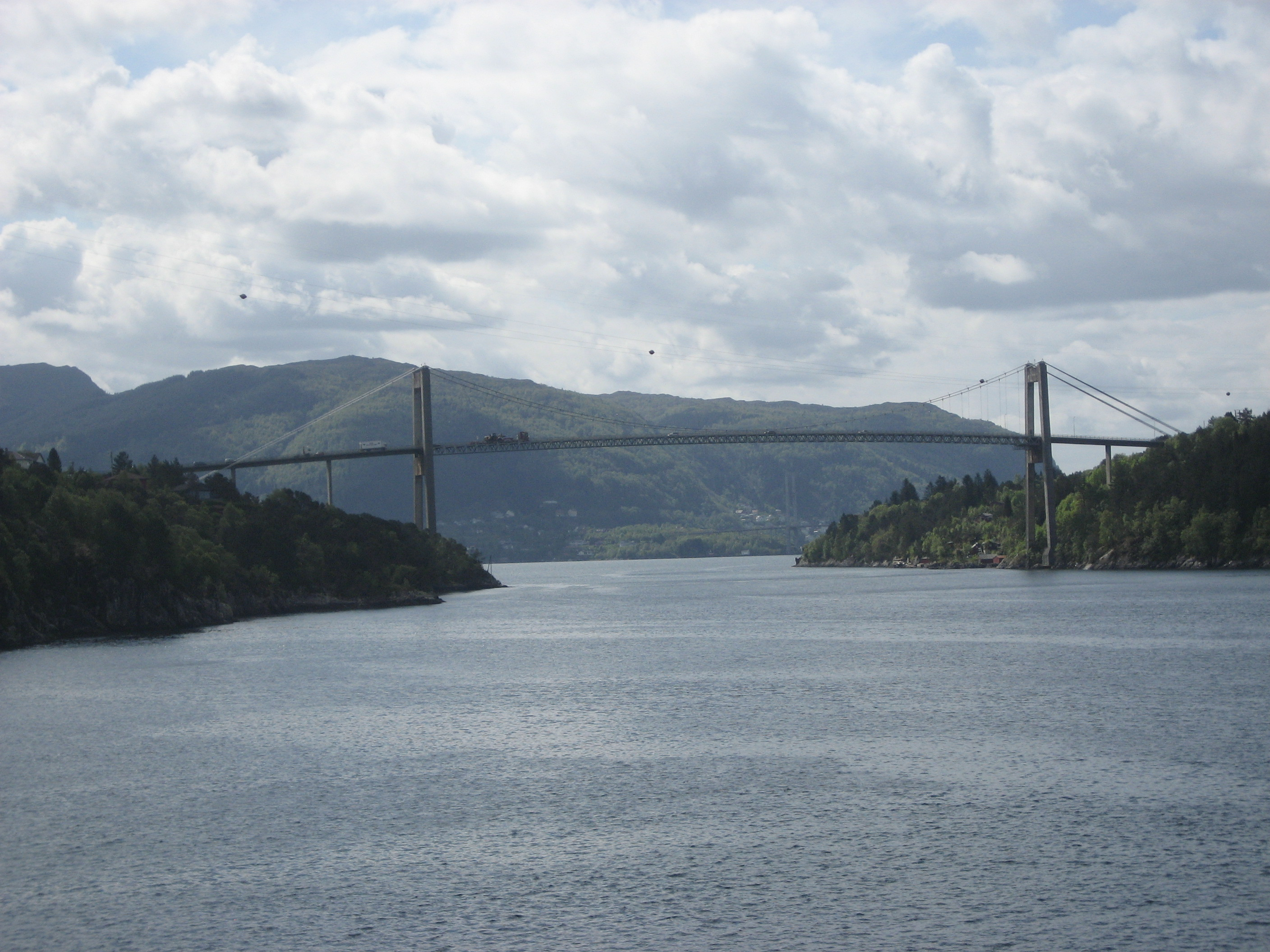
Hagelsund Bridge

- Fv564 to Flatøy and Holsnøy
- Nordhordland Bridge (Nordhordlandsbrua) 1,614 metres (5,295 ft)

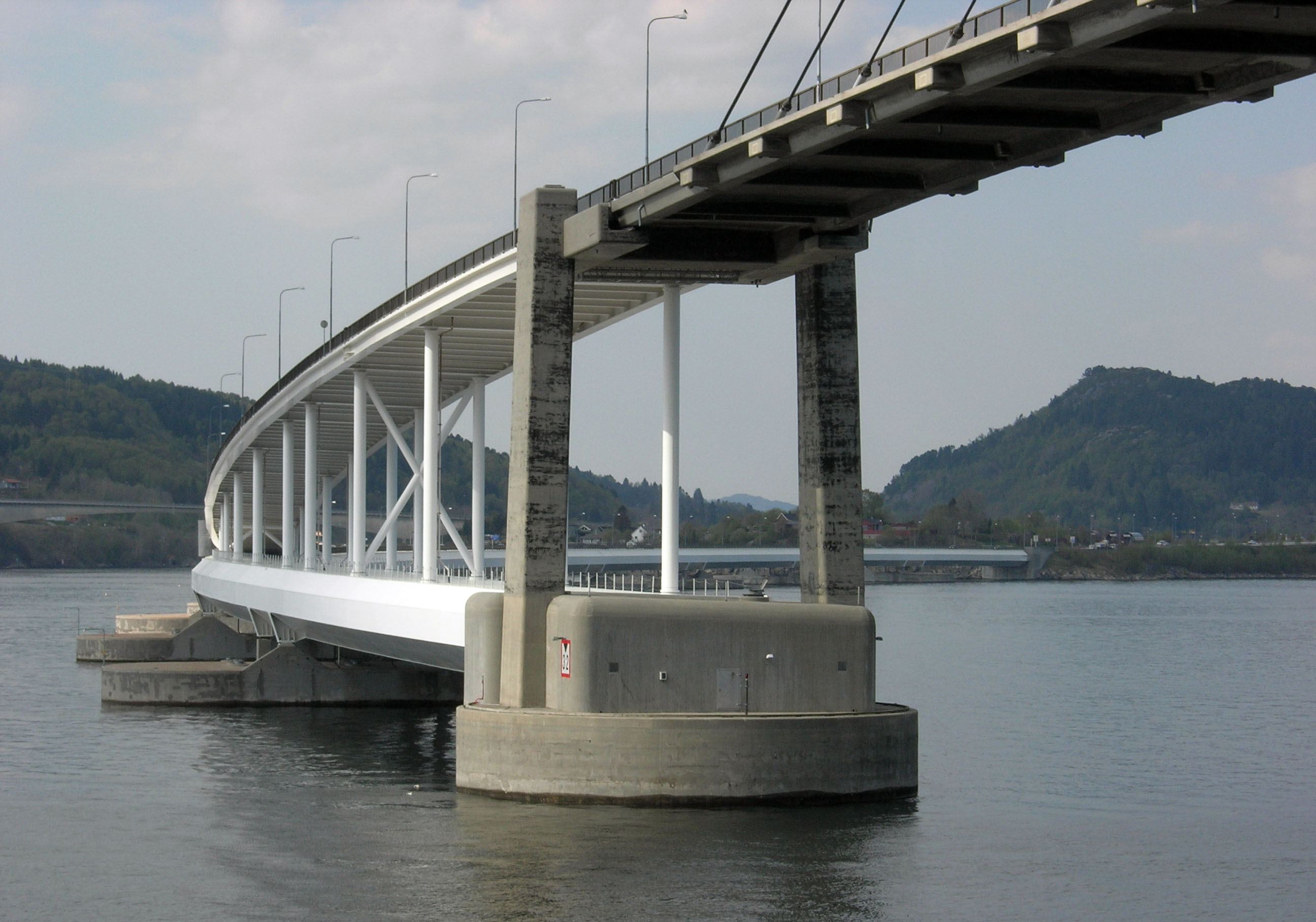
Nordhordlandsbrua pontoon bridge at Bergen

Bergen Municipality

- E16 at Nyborg towards Oslo
- Motorway Vågsbotn – Eidsvåg (5 km)
- Fløyfjellstunnelen (two parallel tunnels, 3195 and 3825 m each)
- Bergen
- E16 in Bergen towards midtown, and Rv555 towards Øygarden Municipality
- 3 Toll stations at Sandviken, Nygårdsbroen and Fjøsangerveien
- Semi-motorway Fjøsanger - Hop (2 km)
- Hop (14 km)
- Råtunnelen (two parallel tunnels, 2160 m each)
- Rv580 to Bergen Airport, Flesland
- Lyshorntunnelen (two parallel tunnels, 9,220 metres (30,250 ft) each)

Bjørnafjorden Municipality

- Toll station at Endelausmarka
- Skogafjellstunnelen (two parallel tunnels, 1510 m each)
- Svegatjørn
- Ferry from Halhjem to Sandvikvåg (40 min, 3 departures per hour, fee)

Fitjar Municipality

- Fv545 to Fitjar

Stord Municipality

- Stordabrua/Stord Bridge (1,076 metres (3,530 ft))
- Bømlafjordtunnelen/Bømlafjord Tunnel (7,888 metres (25,879 ft); 262 metres (860 ft) below sea level)

Sveio Municipality

=== Rogaland county ===
Tysvær Municipality

- Liland toll station
- E134 at Aksdal, towards Haugesund and Drammen

Bokn Municipality

- Ognasund Bridge (Ognasundbrua) (420 metres (1,380 ft))
- Ferry from Arsvågen to Mortavika (25 min, 3 departures per hour, fee)

Stavanger Municipality

- Mastrafjordtunnelen (4,424 metres (14,514 ft))
- Byfjordtunnelen (5,875 metres (19,275 ft))

Randaberg Municipality
Stavanger Municipality

- Randabergveien toll station
- Motorway Tasta-Hove (19 km)
- Eiganes Tunnel (two parallel tunnels, 3,750 metres (12,300 ft) each)
- Rv13 towards Røldal using the Ryfylke Tunnel (14,500 m)
- Rv509 towards Stavanger Airport, Sola
- Refsnesveien toll station

Sandnes Municipality

- Stokkamyra toll station
- Fv44 towards Bryne

Gjesdal Municipality
Bjerkreim Municipality
Eigersund Municipality

- Fv42 towards Tonstad

Lund Municipality

=== Agder County ===
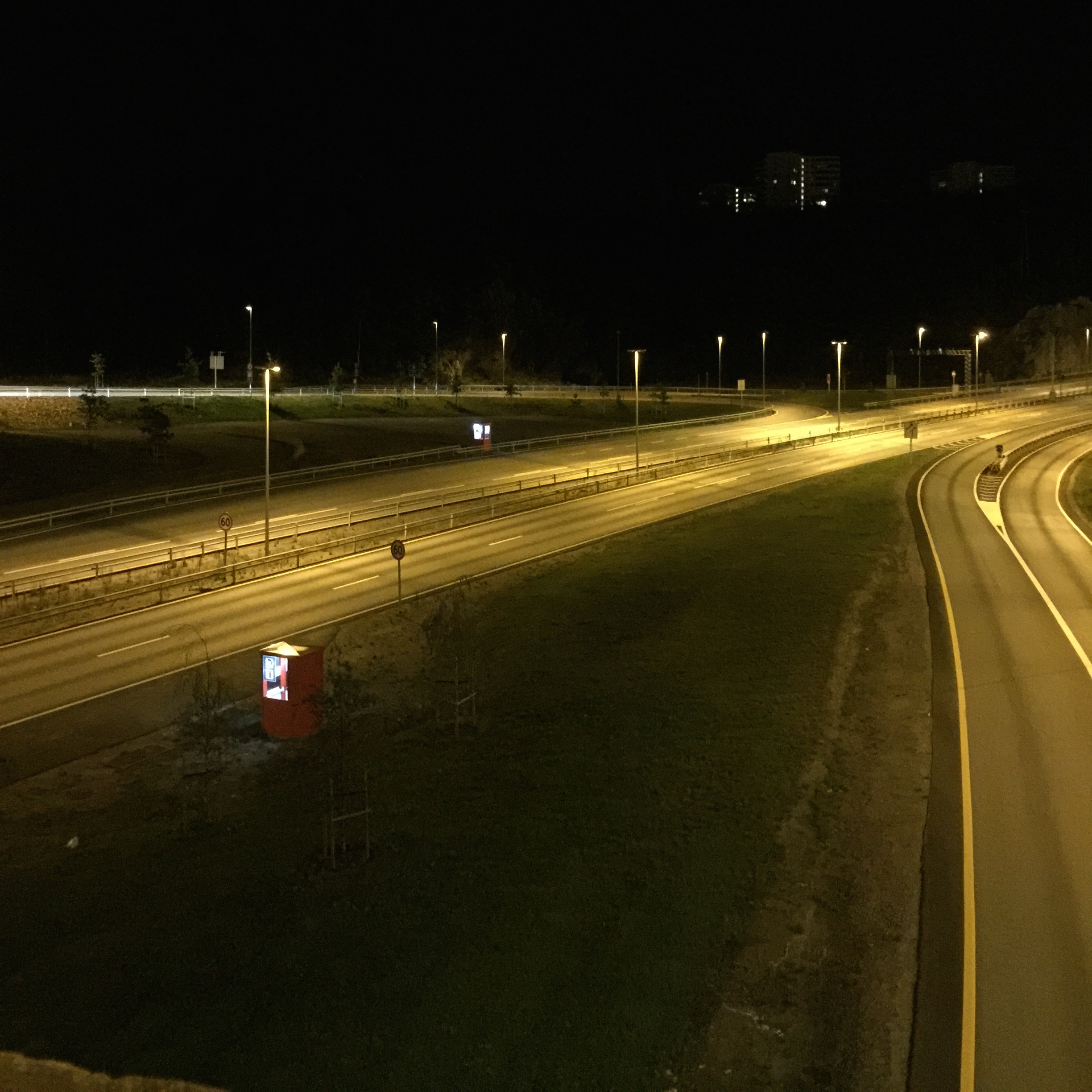
Vesterveien in Kristiansand

Flekkefjord Municipality

- Austadtunnelen (1,040 metres (3,410 ft))
- Fv44 at Flekkefjord towards Sokndal Municipality

Kvinesdal Municipality

- Fedaheitunnelen (1,450 metres (4,760 ft))
- Fedafjorden Bridge (574 metres (1,883 ft) length, 335 metres (1,099 ft) span)
- Teistedalstunnelen (1,920 metres (6,300 ft))
- Vatlandtunnelen (3,180 metres (10,430 ft))

Lyngdal Municipality
Lindesnes Municipality

- Motorway Mandal junction – Grautheller junction (24 km)
- 2 toll stations at Skoieveien and Holbekstjønn

Kristiansand Municipality

- Trysfjord Bridge (534 metres (1,752 ft))
- 3 toll stations at Lohnelier, Storemyr and Vesterveien
- Søgnetunnelen (two parallel tunnels, 4,010 metres (13,160 ft) each)
- E18 at Kristiansand towards Oslo
- E39 towards Hirtshals, Denmark (2–3 hours, 2–5 departures/day, fee)

=== Domestic ferries ===
The E39 ferries are operated by Fjord1 except the Volda-Folkestad and Festøya-Solavågen ferry, which are operated by Norled.

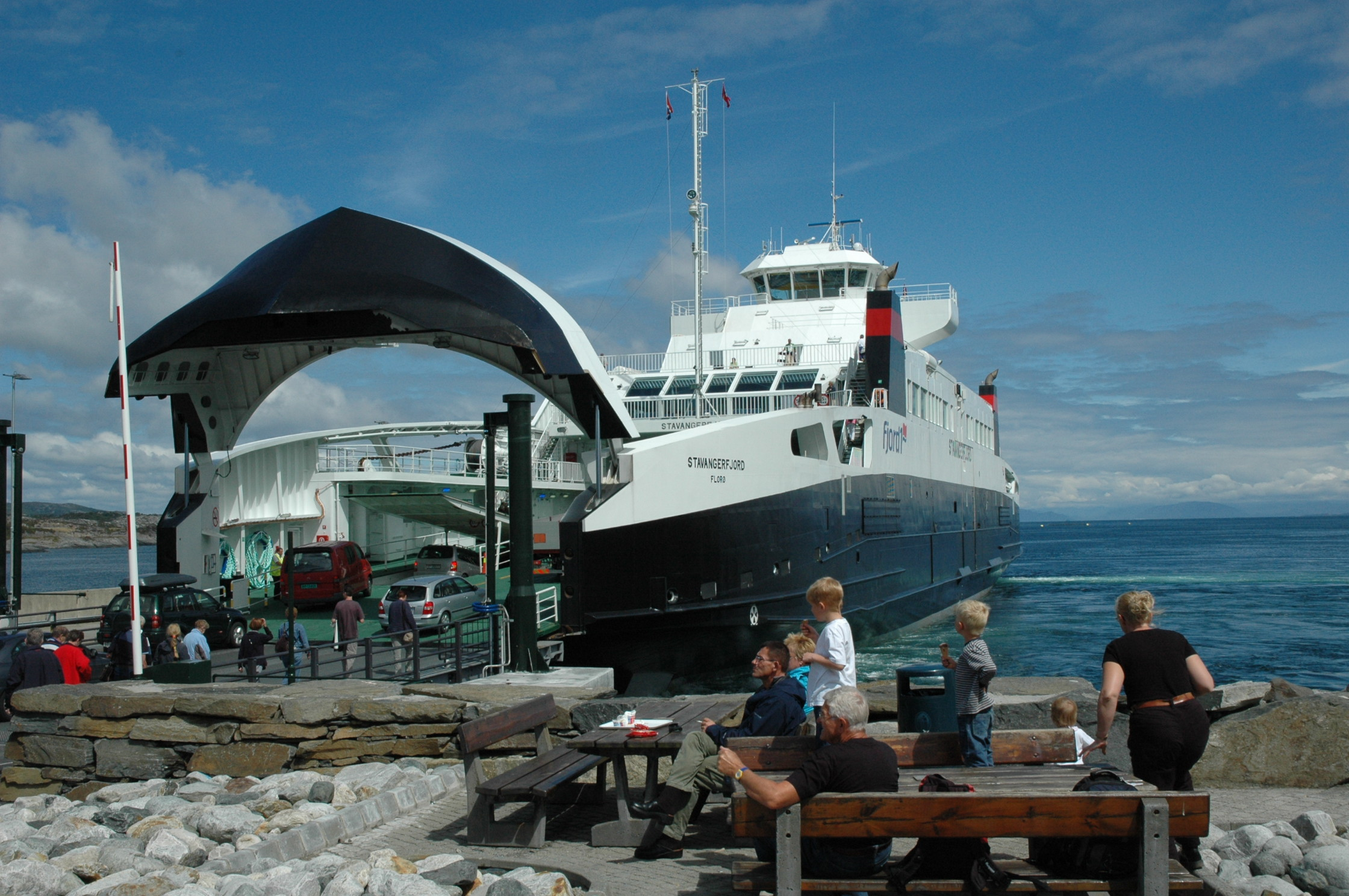
Fjord1 ferry at Arsvågen dock.

Domestic car ferries on the E39 are regarded as an integral part of national highways. Ferries operate according to a published timetable and standard prices for vehicles and passengers. The E39 includes the following ferry routes from North to South (approximate crossing time in minutes):

- Halsa–Kanestraum 20 min.
- Molde–Vestnes 35 min.
- Solavågen–Festøya 20 min.
- Anda–Lote 10 min.
- Lavik–Oppedal 20 min.
- Halhjem–Sandvikvåg 45 min.
- Arsvågen–Mortavika 25 min.

The Norwegian government plans to replace all the ferries on E39 in Norway with bridges and tunnels. This involves some of the longest proposed bridge spans.

=== History ===
In 1786, a royal decision was made to establish a postal route between Bergen and Trondheim. From the establishment of mail in Norway in 1647 until then, all mail between those cities went through Oslo. To begin with, the route was for large parts usable only for walking and horse riding, but in the following decades it was rebuilt and became accessible to horse-drawn carriages. Additionally, several parts were only accessible by boat. The route was Bergen–Åsane–Hordvik–(boat over Salhusfjorden)–Isdal–Hundvin–Gulen–Rutledal–(boat over Sognefjorden)–Leirvik (Hyllestad)–Flekke–Dale–Bygstad–Førde–Jølster–Gloppen-(boat over Nordfjord)–Faleide (Stryn)–Hornindal–Hellesylt–Stranda–(boat along Storfjorden)–Sjøholt–Vestnes-(boat over Romsdalsfjorden)–Molde–Angvika–(boat over Tingvollfjorden)–Tingvoll–(boat over Halsafjorden)–Stangvik–Skei–Rindal–Orkanger–Trondheim. The 1786 decision also included a mail route between Stavanger and Bergen. In 1858, mail was rerouted to the newly established steamship line Bergen–Vadheim, and the mail route changed to Vadheim–Sande–Førde, in parts precisely along today's route.

Since 1990, a number of long bridges and tunnels have replaced four of the ferries. The bridges and tunnels are:

- Nordhordland Bridge (1994)
- Gjemnessund Bridge and Bergsøysund Bridge (1992)
- Stord Bridge and Bømlafjord Tunnel (2000)
- Kviven Tunnel and further tunnels (2012)

Other large road projects include:

- Klett–Orkanger (2005)
- Orkanger–Høgkjølen (2015)
- Lote Tunnel (1966)
- Bogs Tunnel (2004) and the adjacent Norevik Tunnel (2012)
- Masfjord Tunnel and adjacent tunnels (1986–1995)
- Eikefet Tunnel (1980)
- Fløyfjell Tunnel (1989), motorway
- Lyshorn Tunnel (2022), motorway
- Mastrafjord Tunnel and Byfjord Tunnel (1992)
- Eiganes Tunnel, part of the Ryfylke Tunnel project for road 13 (2019)
- Søgne Tunnel (2022), motorway

The route Trondheim–Ålesund–Bergen–Stavanger–Kristiansand was named E39 in 2000. Kristiansund–Stavanger was earlier riksveg 1 (national highway 1, "coastal through-road") from 1992 and riksveg 14 before 1992. Stavanger–Kristiansand was part of E18, and Trondheim – Kristiansund was riksveg 65 and riksveg 71.

=== Future ===
- Rogfast, which will be the world's deepest and longest underwater road tunnel at 27 kilometres (17 mi) long and 392 metres (1,286 ft) deep, was started (first blasting) in 2018 and is expected to be opened in 2033.
- The entire route from Stavanger to Kristiansand is planned to be rebuilt into a four-lane motorway before 2035, with a total of 144 kilometres (89 mi) remaining (as of 2021) to be built.
- Additionally, Norwegian authorities and private contractors have already prepared concrete construction plans that contemplate replacing every ferry link with a fixed connection. There are seven, but each presents a costly technical challenge as the fjords are wide and very deep, and have met public resistance.
  Apart from Rogfast, two projects have a time plan, although delayed:
  - Hordfast (south of Bergen) is prioritised because it serves the highest number of ferry ships, five in operation, and second-most vehicle traffic after Rogfast, despite being probably the most technically challenging of all these crossings. A five-kilometre-long floating bridge over Bjørnafjorden is planned, a new world record, in a stormy area, with clearing for ship traffic below. And a suspension bridge over Langenuen with a 1,700-metre-long (5,600 ft) span, one of the longest in the world. The total cost for Hordfast is estimated at 37 billion NOK ($US 4.31 billion), with road tolls contributing around 400 NOK. Regulatory standards will be completed in 2023, and the construction is estimated to be completed in the 2030s.
  - A crossing of Romsdalsfjord (Ålesund–Molde), having a 16-kilometre-long (9.9 mi) undersea tunnel and a 2000-meter-long suspension bridge with a 1,650-meter-long (5,410 ft) span. Its construction is scheduled to begin around 2030.
- Due to difficult terrain and technical challenges, the construction of the remaining four fjord crossings remains uncertain. Despite this, the realization of their construction has been actively studied.
  - Sognefjorden: a 4 km-long floating bridge is considered.
  - Nordfjorden: a 1.8 km-long suspension bridge with a 1.5 km span is considered.
  - Sulafjorden and Vartdalsfjorden: a 4 km-long floating bridge plus a 2 km-long suspension bridge is considered.
  - Halsafjorden: a 3 km-long floating bridge is considered.

== Norway–Denmark ferry ==
An international car ferry is operated by Color Line and by Fjord Line (seasonally).

Kristiansand – Hirtshals 3 hours 15 minutes

== Danish part ==
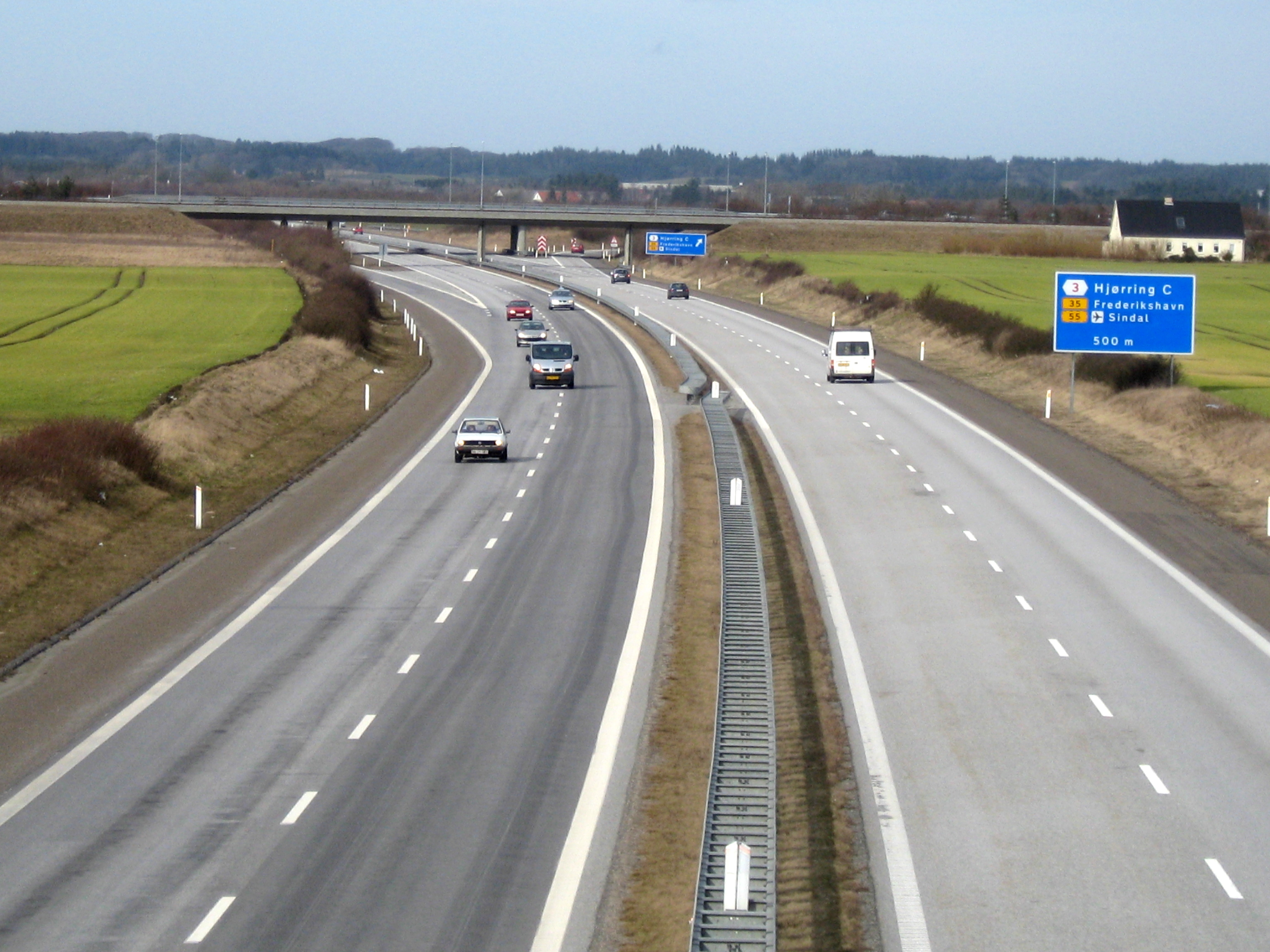
E39 in Denmark, exit 3

From Norway, E39 continues via a ferry from Kristiansand to Hirtshals, in northern Denmark. Ferries are run by Color Line and Fjord Line. The motorway goes from the south of Hirtshals to the north of Aalborg. The exits are:

- Aabyen
- 2 Hjørring N
- 3 Hjørring C
- 4 Hjørring S
- 5 Vrå
- 6 Brønderslev C
- 7 Brønderslev S
- | Store Vildmose
- 8 Tylstrup
- 9 Vestbjerg
- 10 Høvejen → Aalborg Airport
- E45 s Aalborg, Aarhus
