= Tingvollvågen =

Village in Møre og Romsdal county, Norway

Tingvollvågen Tingvoll
- Village
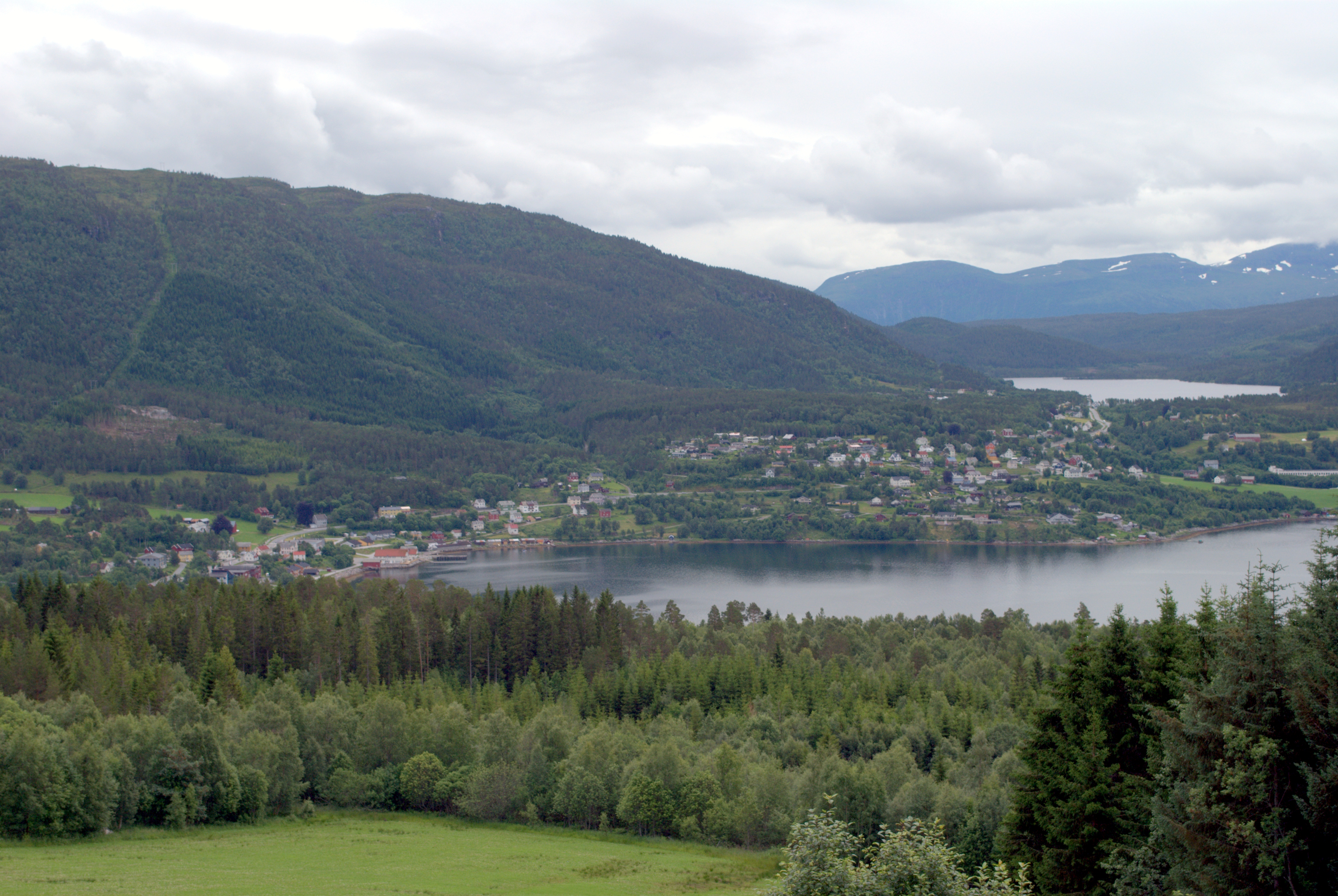
- View of the village
- Interactive map of Tingvollvågen; Tingvoll
- Location within Møre og Romsdal Location within Norway
- Coordinates: 62.9131°N 8.2056°E
- Country: Norway
- Region: Western Norway
- County: Møre og Romsdal
- District: Nordmøre
- Municipality: Tingvoll Municipality

Area
  - Total: 1.37 km^{2} (0.53 sq mi)
- Elevation: 21 m (69 ft)

Population (2024)
  - Total: 1,040
  - Density: 759/km^{2} (1,970/sq mi)
- Time zone: UTC+01:00 (CET)
  - Summer (DST): UTC+02:00 (CEST)
- Post Code: 6630 Tingvoll

Tingvollvågen or Tingvoll is the administrative centre of Tingvoll Municipality in Møre og Romsdal county, Norway. The village is located on a small inlet off the Tingvollfjorden, directly across the fjord from the village of Angvika (in Gjemnes Municipality). Tingvollvågen lies about 10 kilometres (6.2 mi) north of the village of Meisingset and about 20 kilometres (12 mi) south of the village of Straumsnes. The historic Tingvoll Church is located in this village. Norwegian National Road 70 runs through the village on its way from Kristiansund to Oppdal.

The 1.37-square-kilometre (340-acre) village has a population (2024) of 1,040 and a population density of 759 inhabitants per square kilometre (1,970/sq mi).
