= Bergmo Church =

Former church in Møre og Romsdal, Norway

- Bergmo kirke
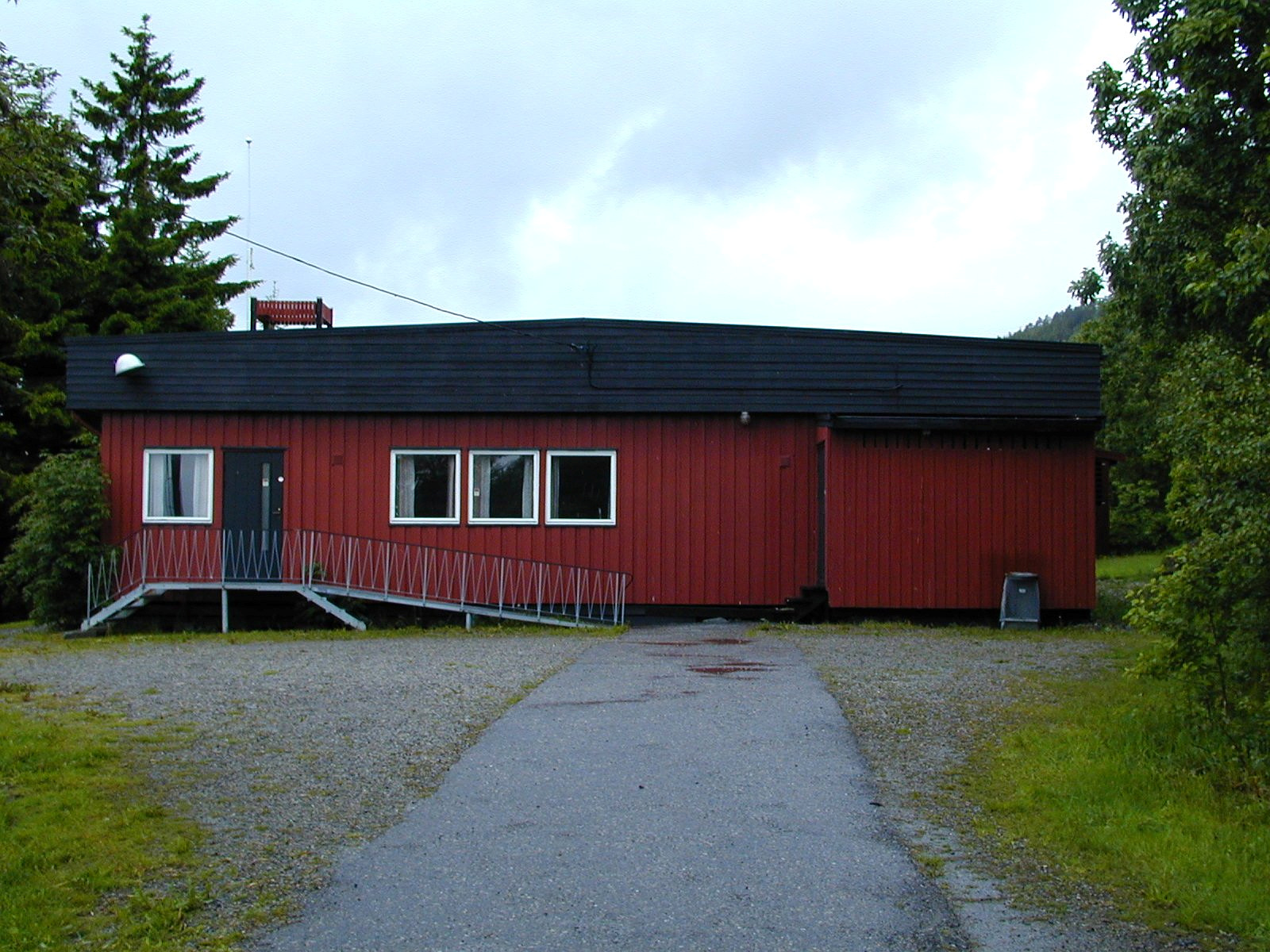
- View of the church
- Bergmo Church
- 62°44′48″N 7°13′29″E
- Location: Molde Municipality, Møre og Romsdal
- Country: Norway
- Denomination: Church of Norway
- Churchmanship: Evangelical Lutheran

History
- Status: Parish church
- Consecrated: 1982

Architecture
- Functional status: Closed
- Architect: Trond Lage Edvardsen
- Architectural type: Long church
- Closed: 2017

Specifications
- Capacity: 300
- Materials: Wood

Administration
- Diocese: Møre bispedømme
- Deanery: Molde domprosti
- Parish: Bolsøy

Bergmo Church (Norwegian: Bergmo kirke) was a parish church of the Church of Norway in Molde Municipality in Møre og Romsdal county, Norway. It was located in the Bergmo area of the town of Molde, about 3.5 kilometres (2.2 mi) east of the town center. It was an annex church for the Bolsøy parish which is part of the Molde domprosti (arch-deanery) in the Diocese of Møre. The red, wooden building was bought by the parish and converted into a church in 1982. The building was designed by the architect Trond Lage Edvardsen. The church seated about 300 people. The church was closed and sold in the summer of 2017. The people of the Bergmo church have attended Nordbyen Church since that time.

== See also ==
- List of churches in Møre
