= Stromness (disambiguation) =

Stromness is the second largest town on Orkney, Scotland.

Stromness may also refer to:

- Stromness, South Georgia, a whaling station on South Georgia Island, South Atlantic
- Stromness Bay, South Georgia Island
- Stromness, a community in Haldimand County, Ontario, Canada
- RFA Stromness (A344), later USNS Saturn, a 1966 ship of the British Royal Fleet Auxiliary used in the Falklands War
- Stromness, the 2009 debut novel by German artist Herbert Wetterauer

== See also ==
- Straumsnes (disambiguation)
- Åsmund L. Strømnes, (1927-200, Norwegian teacher
