= Tingvoll Church =

Church in Møre og Romsdal, Norway

- Tingvoll kyrkje
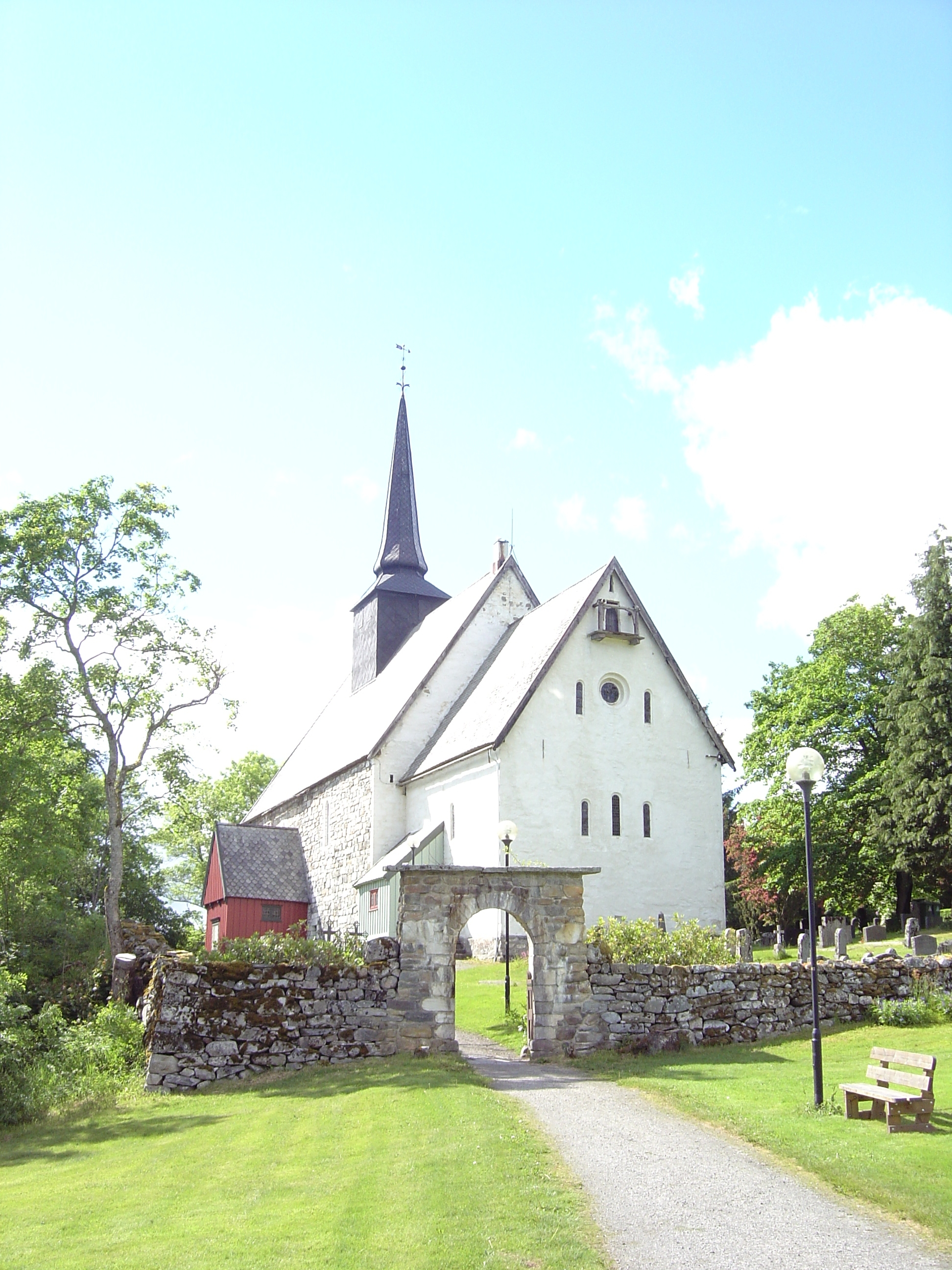
- View of the church
- Tingvoll Church
- 62.9118555283°N 8.1816025078°E
- Location: Tingvoll Municipality, Møre og Romsdal
- Country: Norway
- Denomination: Church of Norway
- Previous denomination: Catholic Church
- Churchmanship: Evangelical Lutheran

History
- Status: Parish church
- Founded: c. 1150-1200
- Consecrated: c. 1150-1200

Architecture
- Functional status: Active
- Architectural type: Long church
- Style: Romanesque
- Completed: c. 1175 (851 years ago)

Specifications
- Capacity: 430
- Length: 32 metres (105 ft)
- Materials: Stone

Administration
- Diocese: Møre bispedømme
- Deanery: Indre Nordmøre prosti
- Parish: Tingvoll
- Norwegian Cultural Heritage Site
- Type: Church
- Status: Automatically protected
- ID: 85625

Tingvoll Church (Norwegian: Tingvoll kyrkje) is a parish church of the Church of Norway in Tingvoll Municipality in Møre og Romsdal county, Norway. It is located in the village of Tingvollvågen. It is the church for the Tingvoll parish which is part of the Indre Nordmøre prosti (deanery) in the Diocese of Møre. The stone church was built in a long church style during the second half of the 1100s by an unknown architect. The church seats about 430 people.

== History ==
The church is one of the few remaining old stone churches that was built in Norway. The earliest existing historical records of the church date back to the year 1333, but it was not new that year. There is some uncertainty as to when it was actually constructed, but records indicate it was between 1150 and 1200. The church was built here, since during the pre-Christian era, Tingvoll was an assembly place (Norwegian: ting) for all of the Nordmøre region. As a consequence the church is sometimes called Nordmørsdomen, meaning the Nordmøre cathedral. The centuries-old Romanesque style Tingvoll church and the large angular farmhouse beside it, lie on a spot on the north side of the Tingvollfjorden, just outside the village of Tingvollvågen off of Norwegian National Road 70 (Rv70).

In 1814, this church served as an election church (Norwegian: valgkirke). Together with more than 300 other parish churches across Norway, it was a polling station for elections to the 1814 Norwegian Constituent Assembly which wrote the Constitution of Norway. This was Norway's first national elections. Each church parish was a constituency that elected people called "electors" who later met together in each county to elect the representatives for the assembly that was to meet at Eidsvoll Manor later that year.

== Design ==
The church is 32 metres (105 ft) long and the steeple and spire (added in 1787) is 36 metres (118 ft) tall. The rectangular nave measures about 22 by 12.5 metres (72 ft × 41 ft) and the chancel measures about 10 by 10 metres (33 ft × 33 ft). The 1.8-metre (5 ft 11 in) thick walls have corridors inside, both on the south side and on the north side. The corridors lead to steep stairs up to the crown of the wall under the rafters and then down again with the same steep pitch. It is a mystery why they were constructed. So also a balcony outside under the gable, located above the chancel. The church is richly decorated. From the painted walls in the weaponhouse, the whitewash paintings inside the nave, to the arc ceiling in the chancel which is adorned with stars and half moons. In the chancel wall, behind the top of the altarpiece, there is a marble rock with runic inscriptions. This inscription contains a prayer and also what is believed to be the name of a person named Gunnar who built the church. In 1928-1929 the church underwent some restoration work.

== Media gallery ==
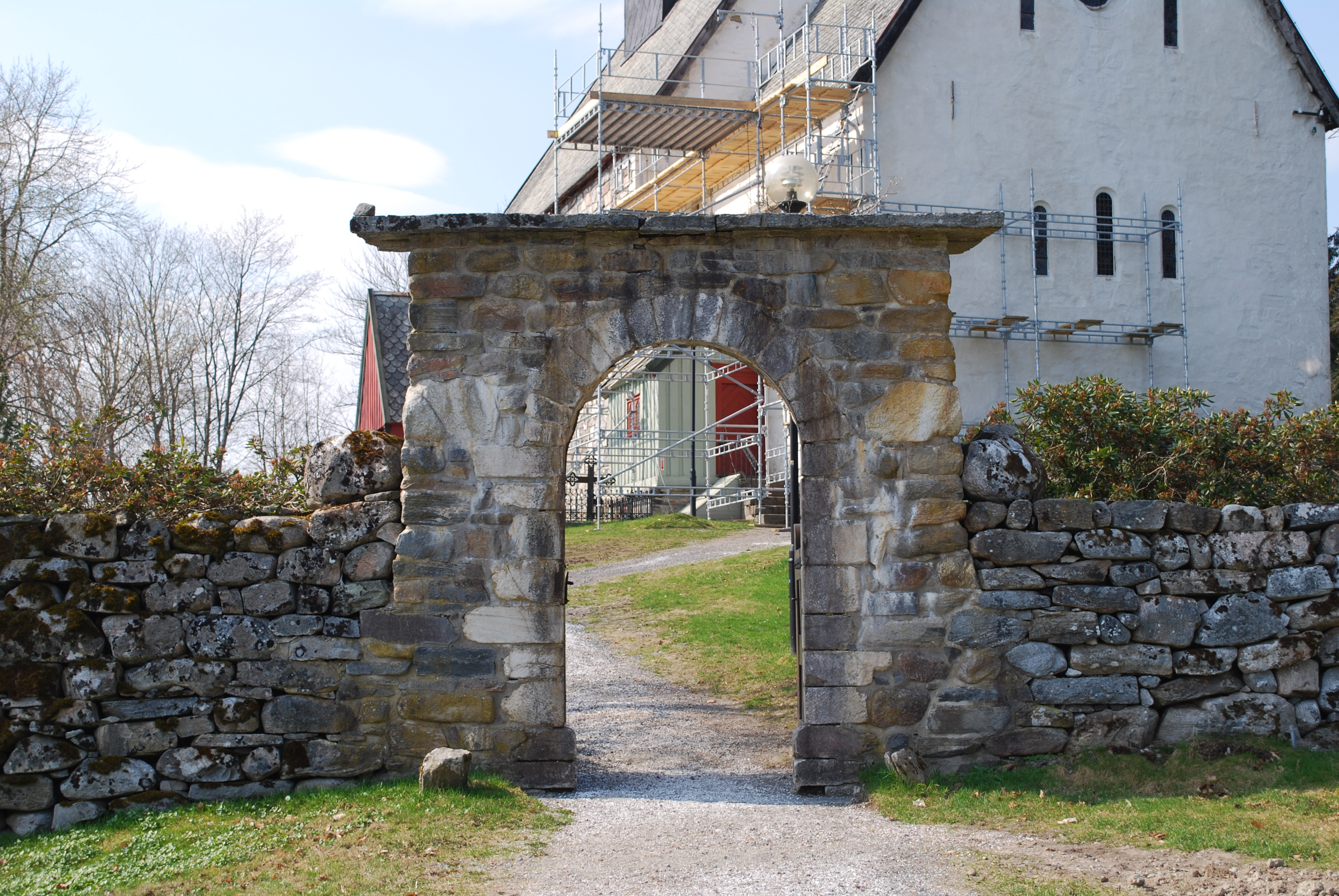
Church archway

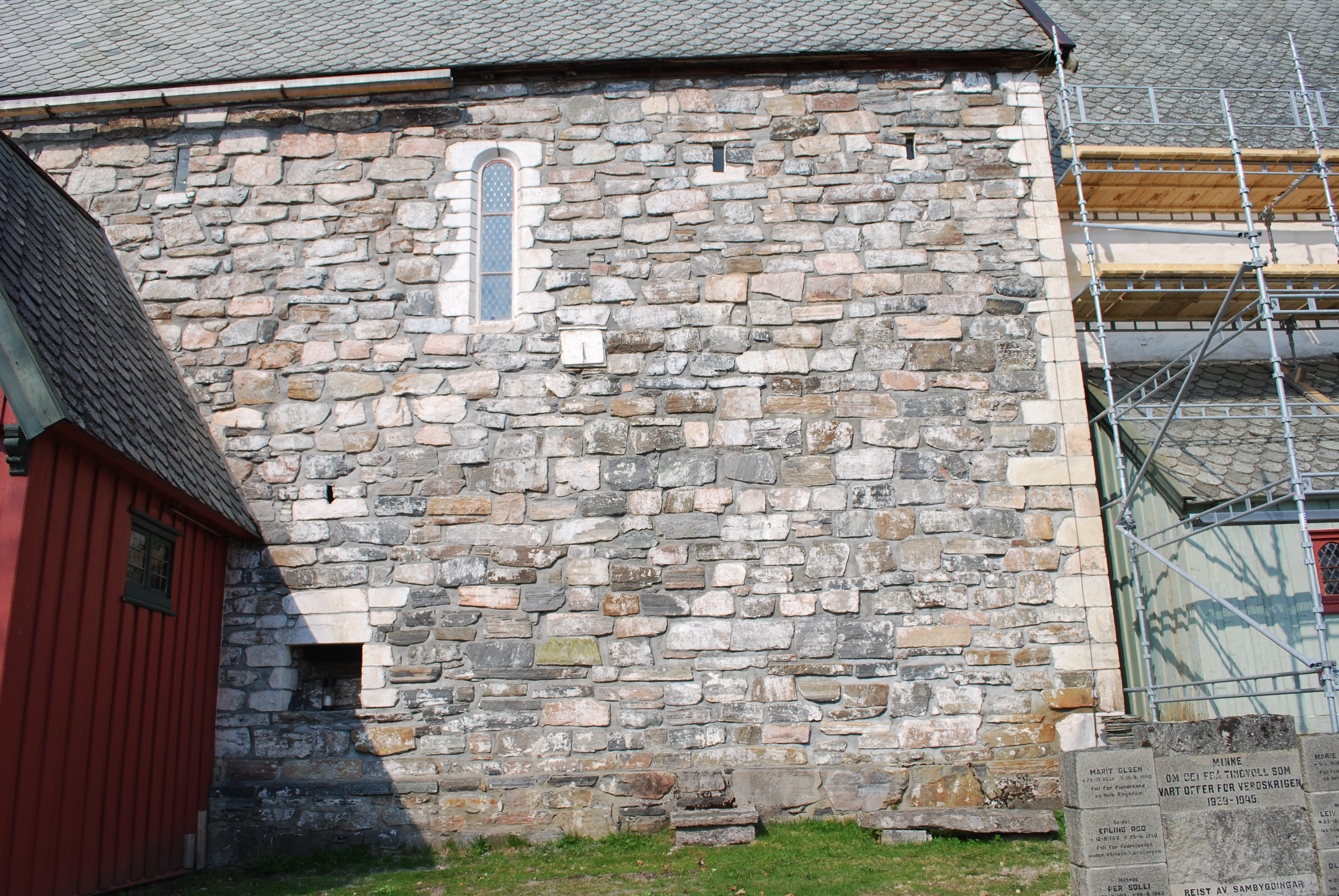
Restoration of the church wall in 2011

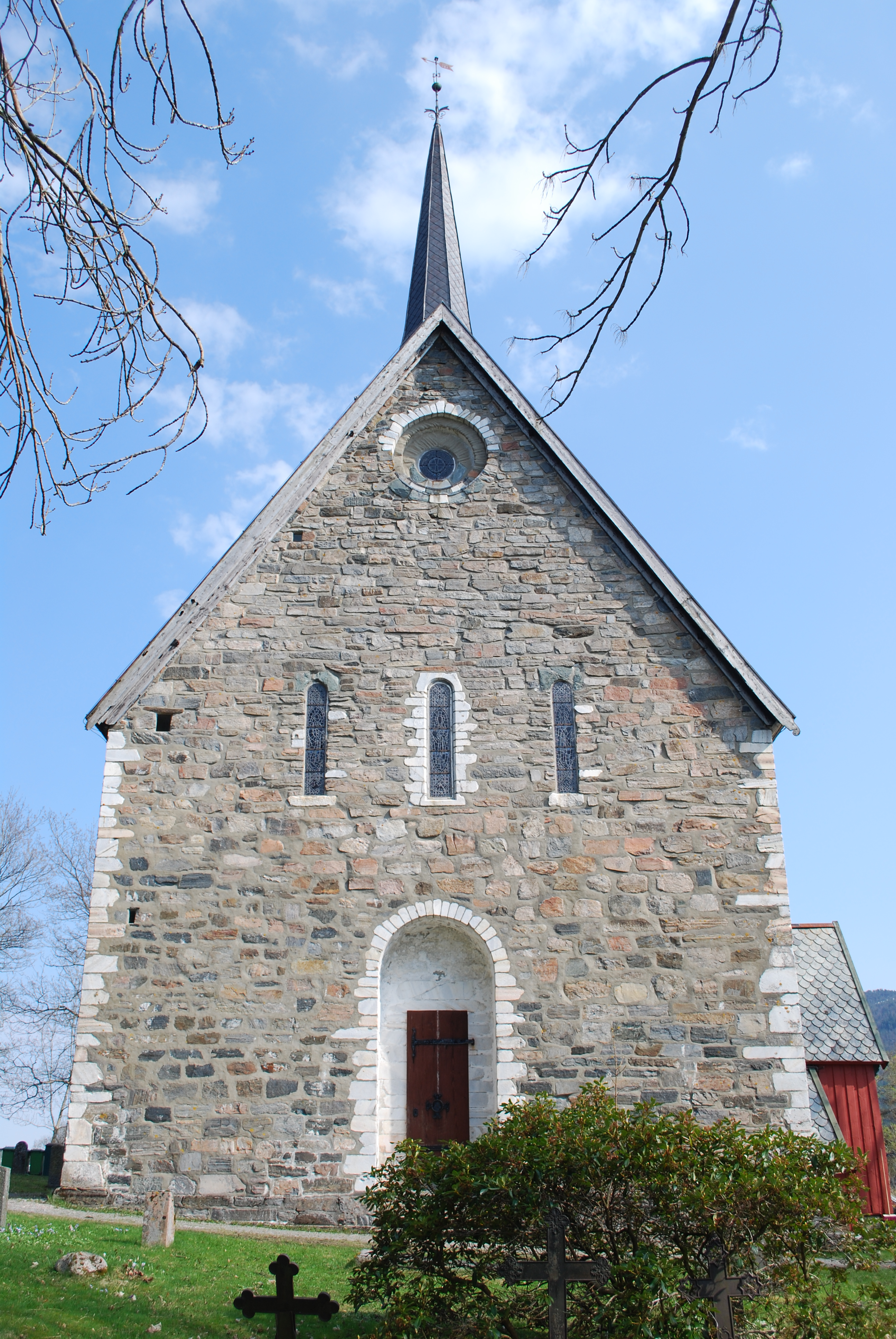
Church western front

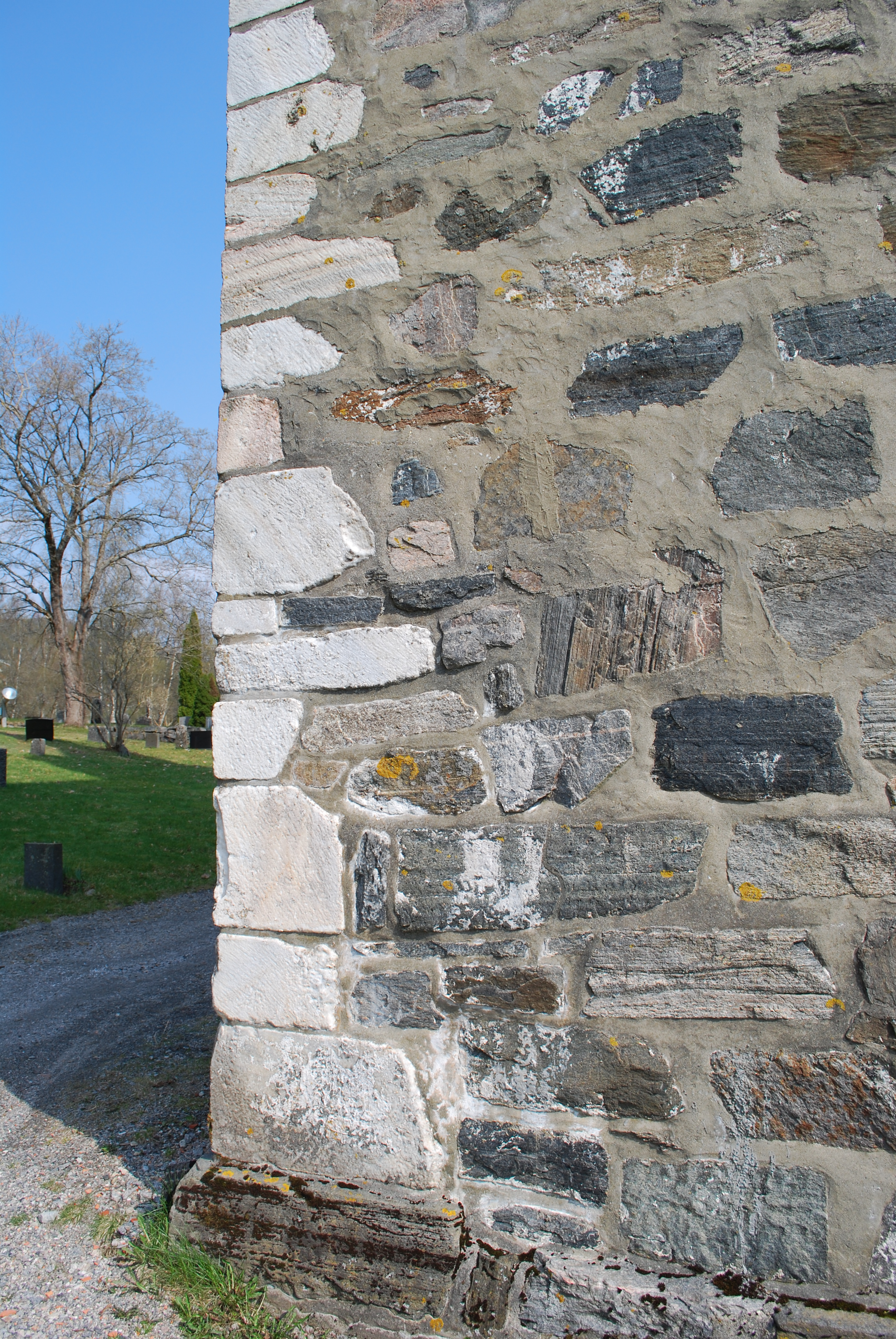
Marble blocks in the corners

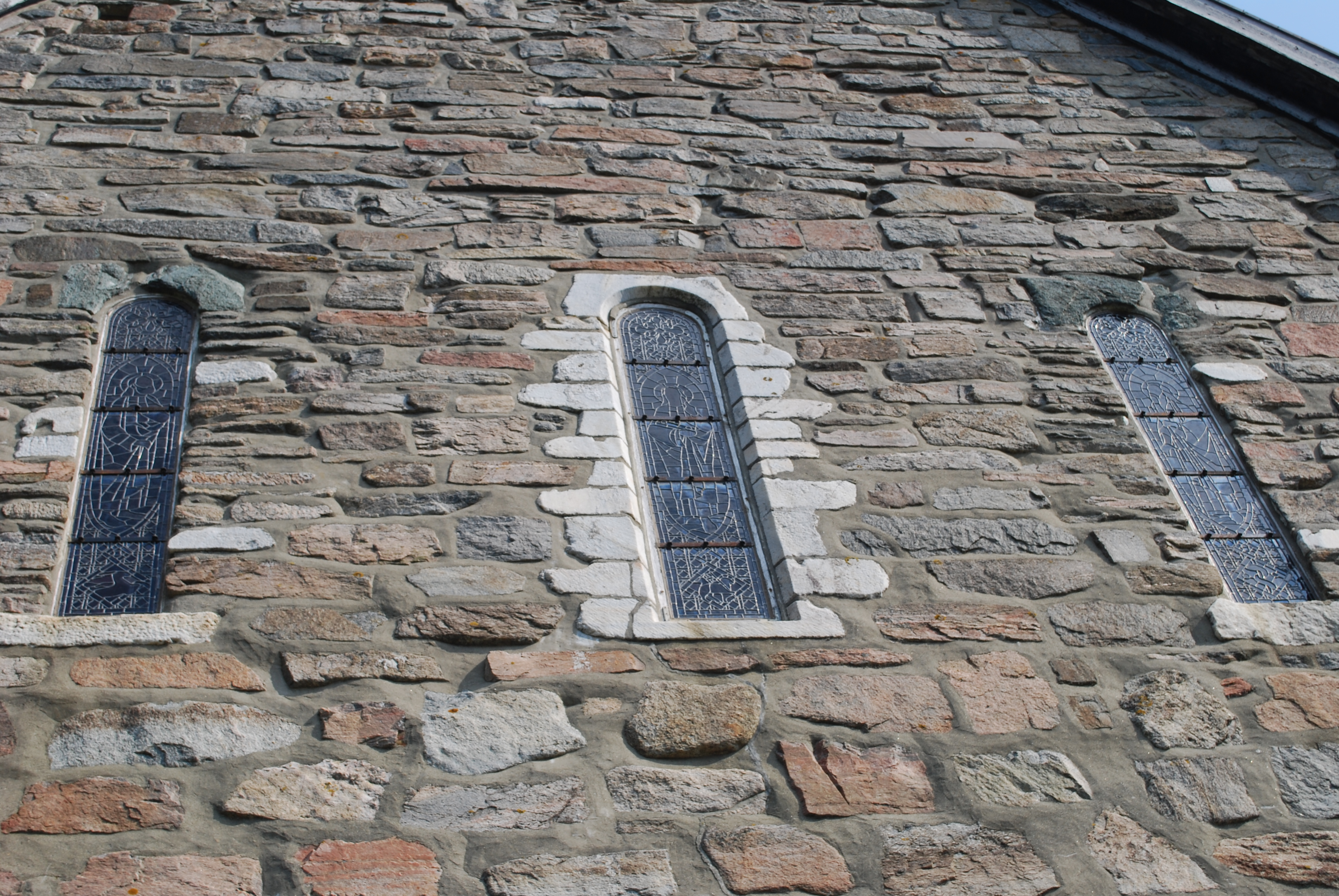
Glass window in the western front

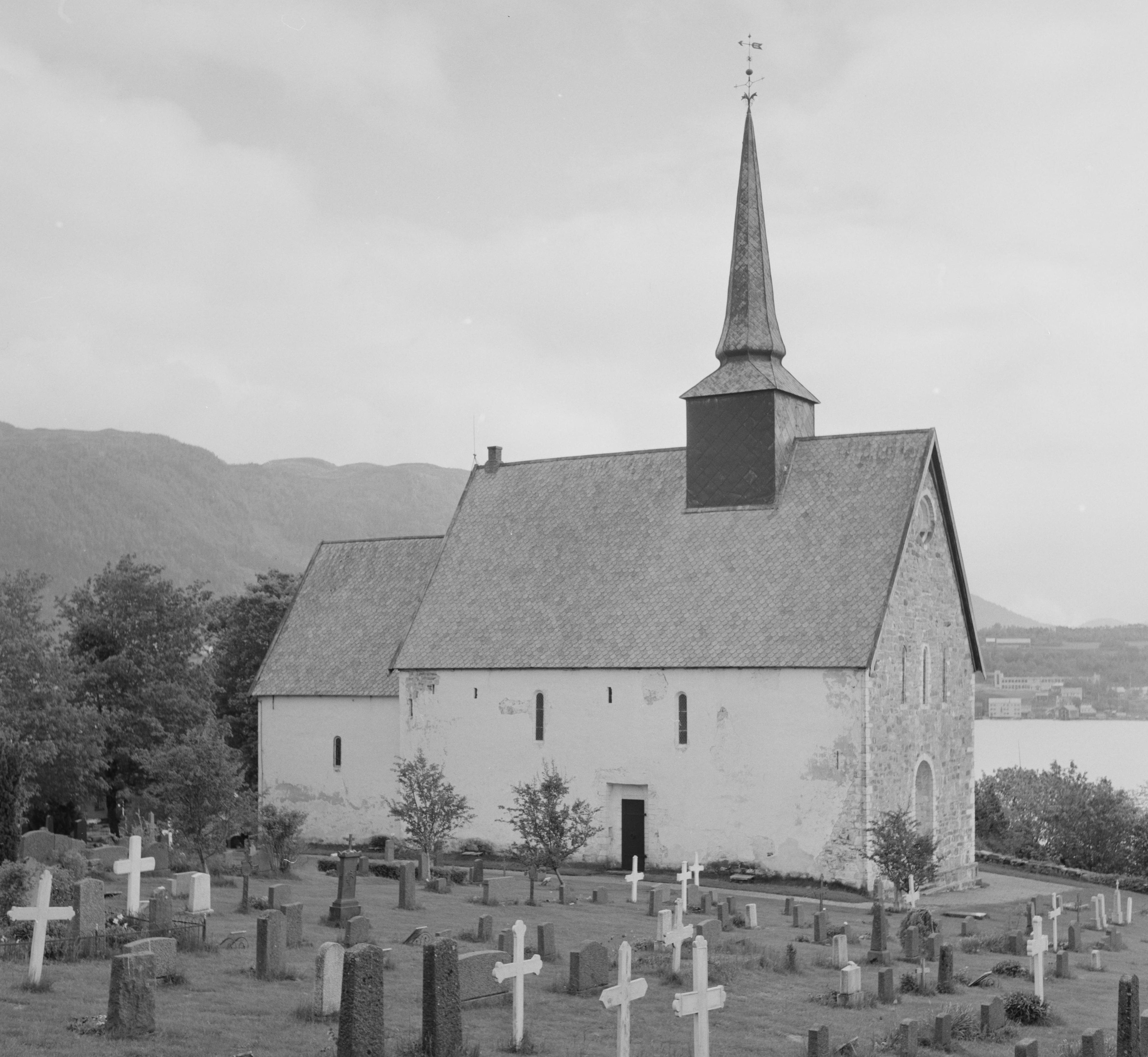

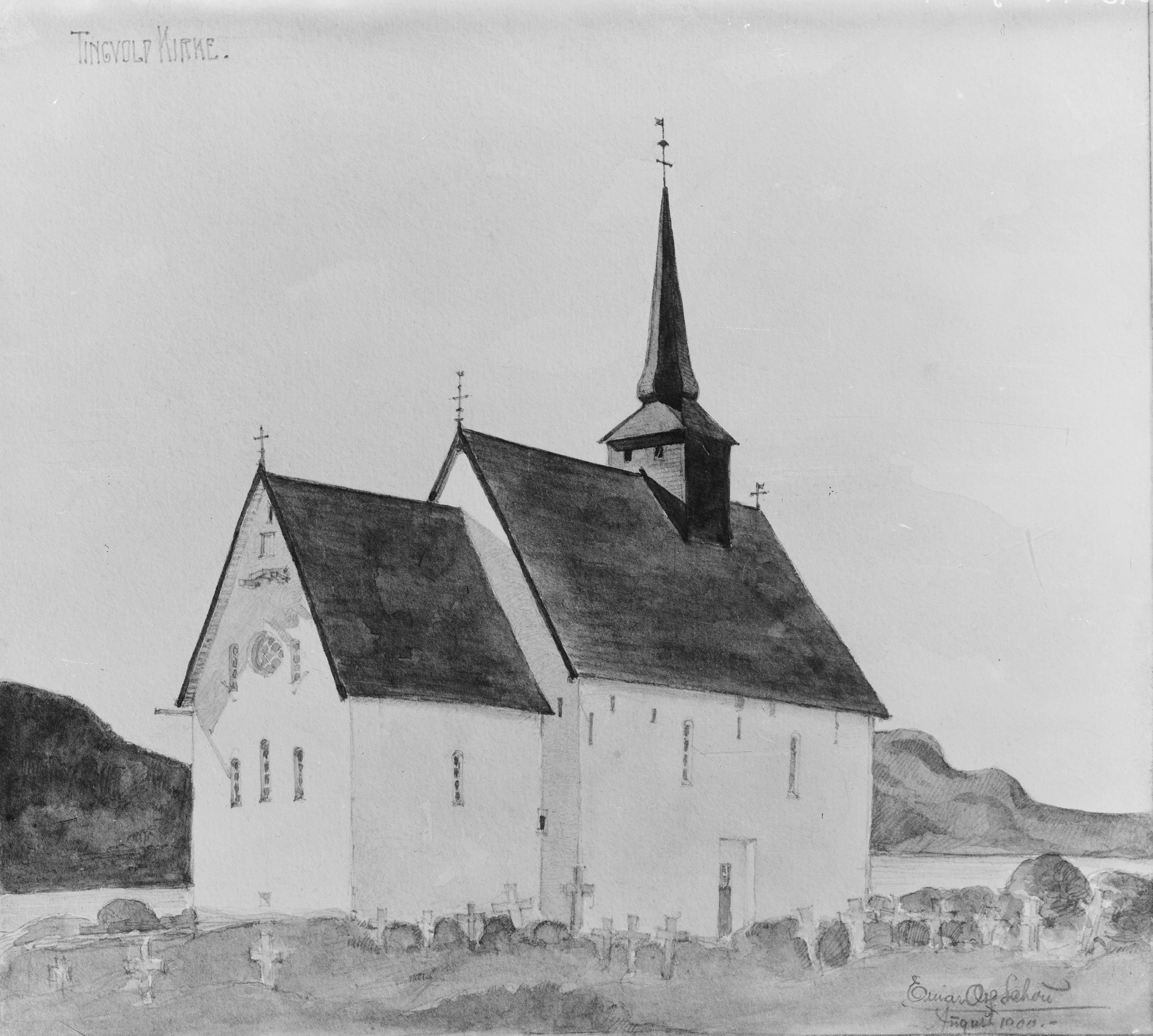

== See also ==
- List of churches in Møre
