= Straumsnes =

Straumsnes may refer to the following locations:

- Straumsnes, Møre og Romsdal, a village in Tingvoll Municipality in Møre og Romsdal county, Norway
- Straumsnes Municipality, a former municipality now in Tingvoll Municipality in Møre og Romsdal county, Norway
- Straumsnes, Bø, a village in Bø Municipality in Nordland county, Norway
- Straumsnes, Fauske, a village in Fauske Municipality in Nordland county, Norway
- Straumsnes, Narvik, a village in Narvik Municipality in Nordland county, Norway

== See also ==
- Straumnes
- Stromness
