= Molde Cathedral =

Church in Møre og Romsdal, Norway

- Molde domkirke
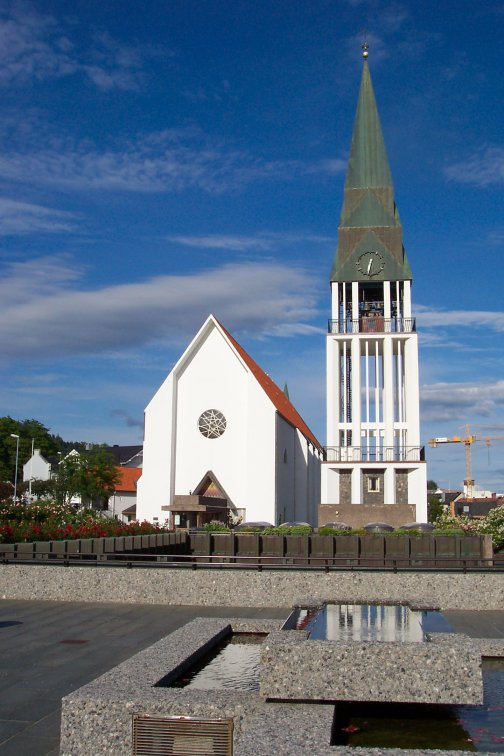
- View of the church
- Molde Cathedral
- 62°44′18″N 7°09′36″E
- Location: Molde Municipality, Møre og Romsdal
- Country: Norway
- Denomination: Church of Norway
- Churchmanship: Evangelical Lutheran

History
- Status: Cathedral
- Founded: 1662
- Consecrated: 8 December 1957

Architecture
- Functional status: Active
- Architect: Finn Bryn
- Architectural type: Basilica
- Completed: 1957 (69 years ago)

Specifications
- Capacity: 1000
- Materials: Stone/brick

Administration
- Diocese: Møre bispedømme
- Deanery: Molde domprosti
- Parish: Molde domkirke
- Norwegian Cultural Heritage Site
- Type: Church
- Status: Listed
- ID: 84975

Molde Cathedral (Norwegian: Molde domkirke) is a cathedral of the Church of Norway in Molde Municipality in Møre og Romsdal county, Norway. It is located in the town of Molde. It is the church for the Molde domkirke parish as well as the seat of the Molde domprosti (arch-deanery) and the episcopal seat of the Diocese of Møre. The white, brick church was built in a long church basilica design in 1957 by the architect Finn Bryn. The church seats about 700 people.

This building was built to replace an earlier church here, and it is the third church to be located on the same site. It became a cathedral in 1983 when the Diocese of Møre was created.

== Structure ==
The cathedral is a double-nave basilica that has a free-standing bell tower next to the main building. The cathedral seats about 1000 people. The church building is shaped like a long "basilica", but with a central aisle and another on the north side, but not on the south side. The entrance consists of two copper-clad doors surrounded by fields in natural concrete under a gable roof. The square campanile (bell tower) is at the church's southwest corner, and it is approximately 60 metres (200 ft) tall. Behind the church's main entry doors to the west, there is a spacious rectangular foyer which leads into the sanctuary.

== History ==
The first church in Molde was built in 1662 and it was a wooden, cruciform building. The original site of the church was about 40 metres (130 ft) to the north of the present church.

In 1814, this church served as an election church (Norwegian: valgkirke). Together with more than 300 other parish churches across Norway, it was a polling station for elections to the 1814 Norwegian Constituent Assembly which wrote the Constitution of Norway. This was Norway's first national elections. Each church parish was a constituency that elected people called "electors" who later met together in each county to elect the representatives for the assembly that was to meet at Eidsvoll Manor later that year.

In 1841–42, the church was heavily renovated and large portions being rebuilt in essentially the same style. On 17 May 1885, a cannon was fired from the heights above the church in a salute celebrating a holiday. Unfortunately, the cannonball struck the church tower, causing a fire which destroyed the church. A wooden neo-Gothic dragestil long church was built to replace it in 1887. This building was designed by Henrik Nissen. This church burned down during the bombing of Molde on 29 April 1940 (during World War II). After the war was over, planning for a new church began, to designs by architect Finn Bryn (1890-1975), who was awarded the contract after winning a competition for a new church in Molde in 1948. The new church would be built about 40 metres (130 ft) south of the old church site. Total costs came in about 3 million kr. The foundation stone was laid in 1953 and it was completed in 1957. The new building was consecrated on 8 December 1957.

=== Bishops ===
The cathedral has been the seat of the Bishop of the Diocese of Møre since its establishment in 1983. The following Bishops have served in this cathedral:

- Ole Nordhaug (1983-1991)
- Odd Bondevik (1991-2008)
- Ingeborg Midttømme (since 2008)

== Media gallery ==
Present church building

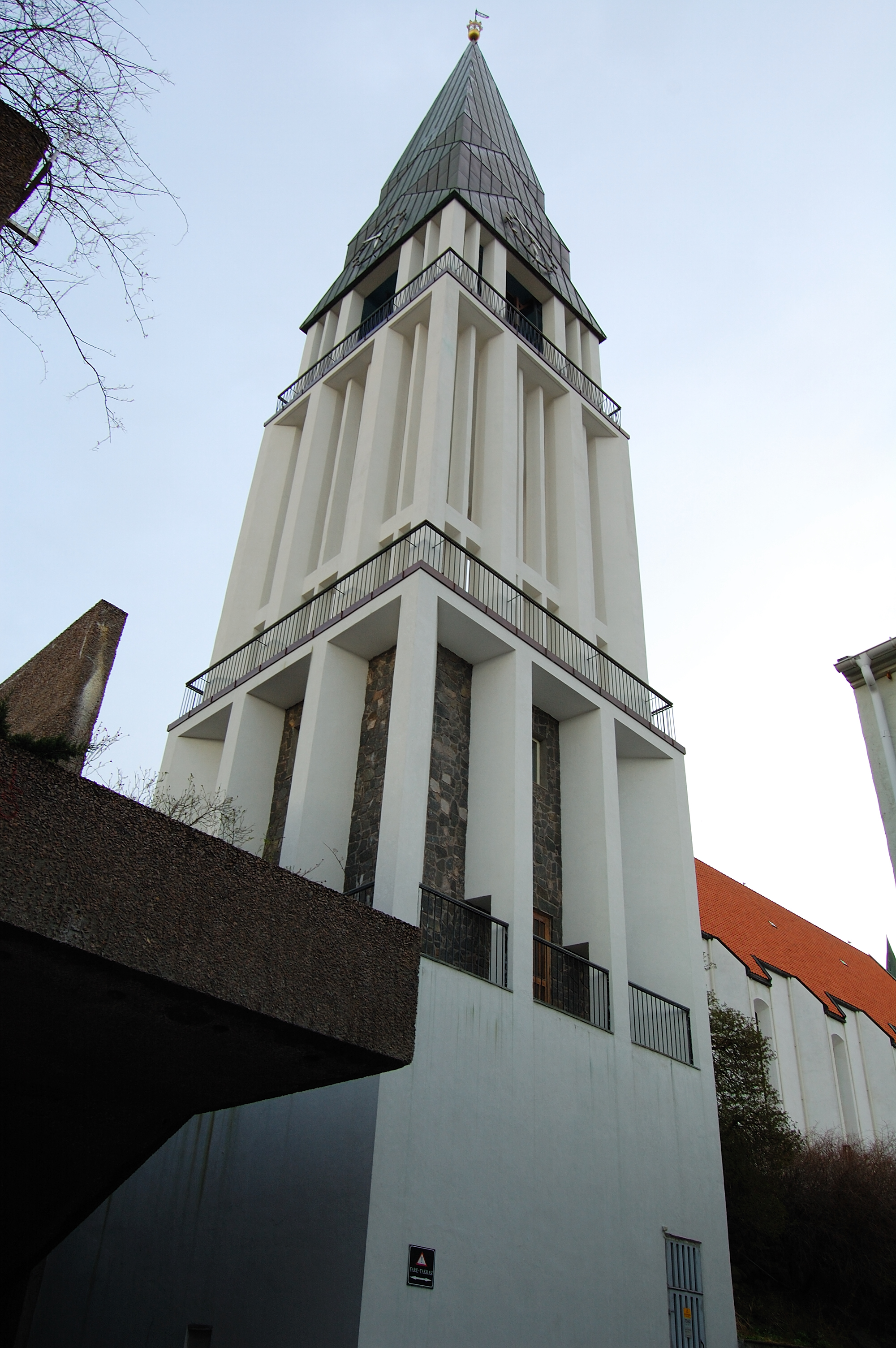
Campanile (bell tower)

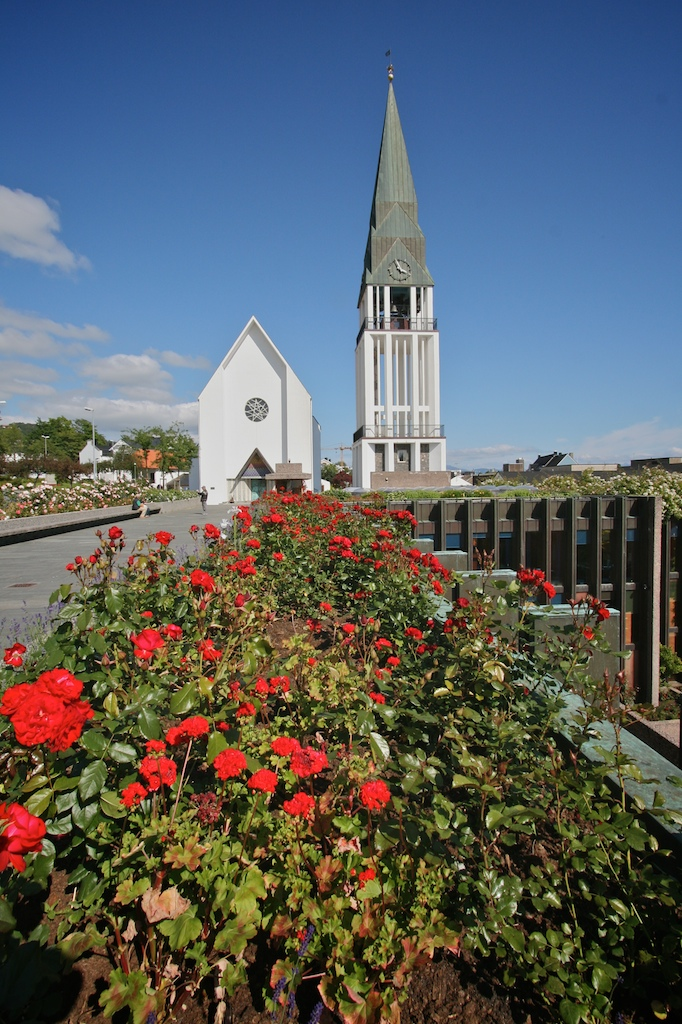
Exterior (looking east)

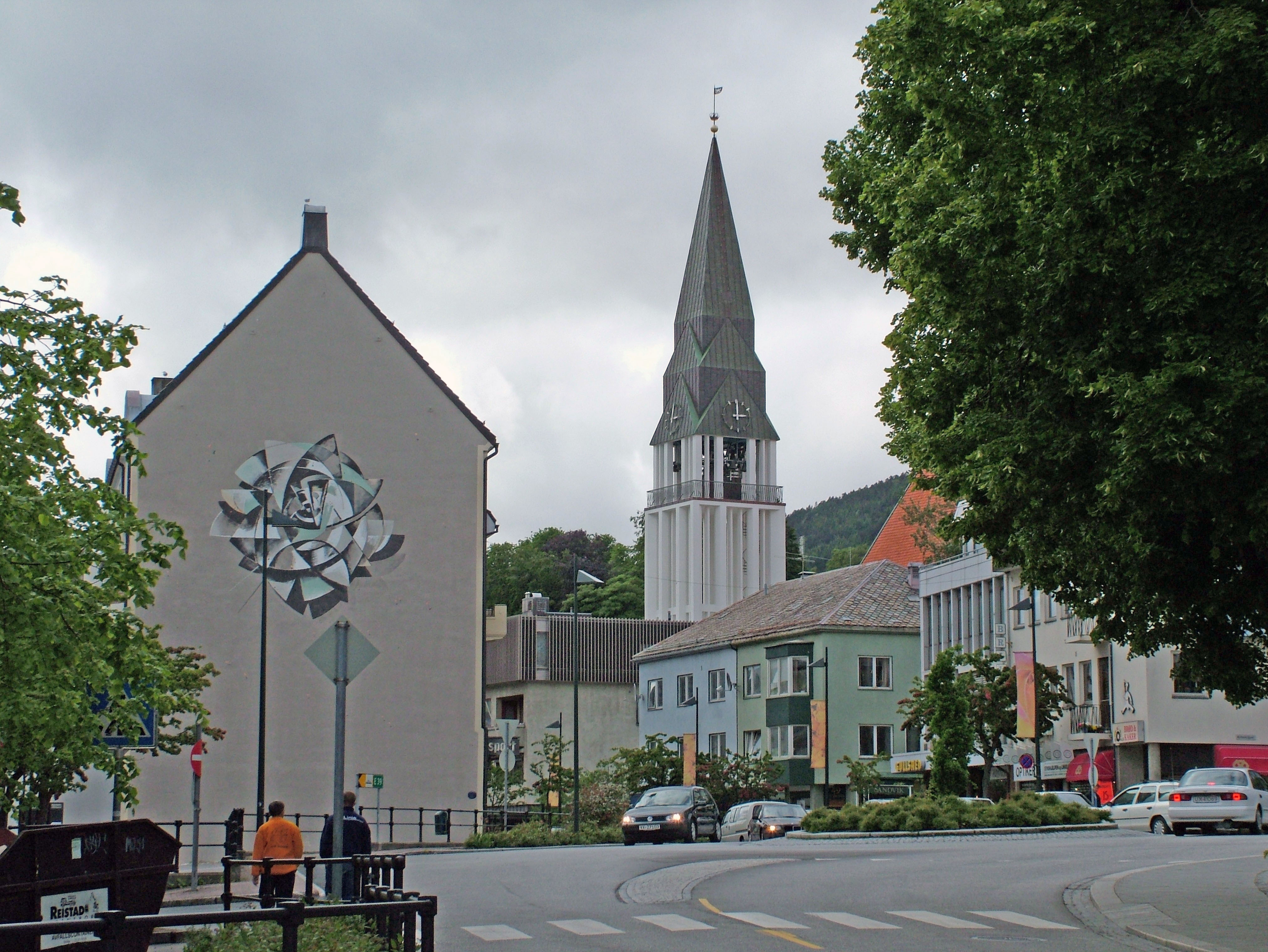
Exterior tower (looking northwest)

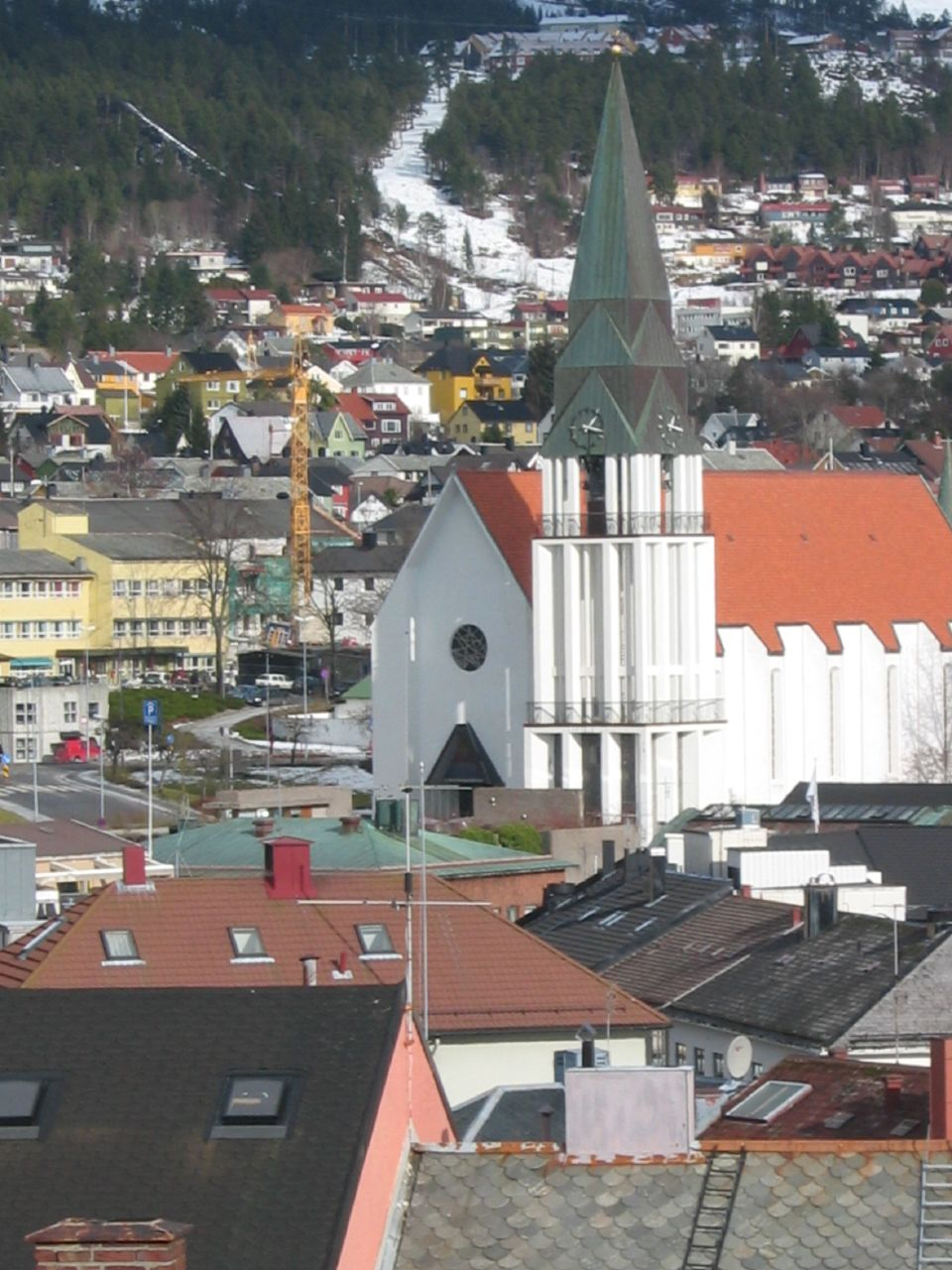
Exterior (looking northeast)

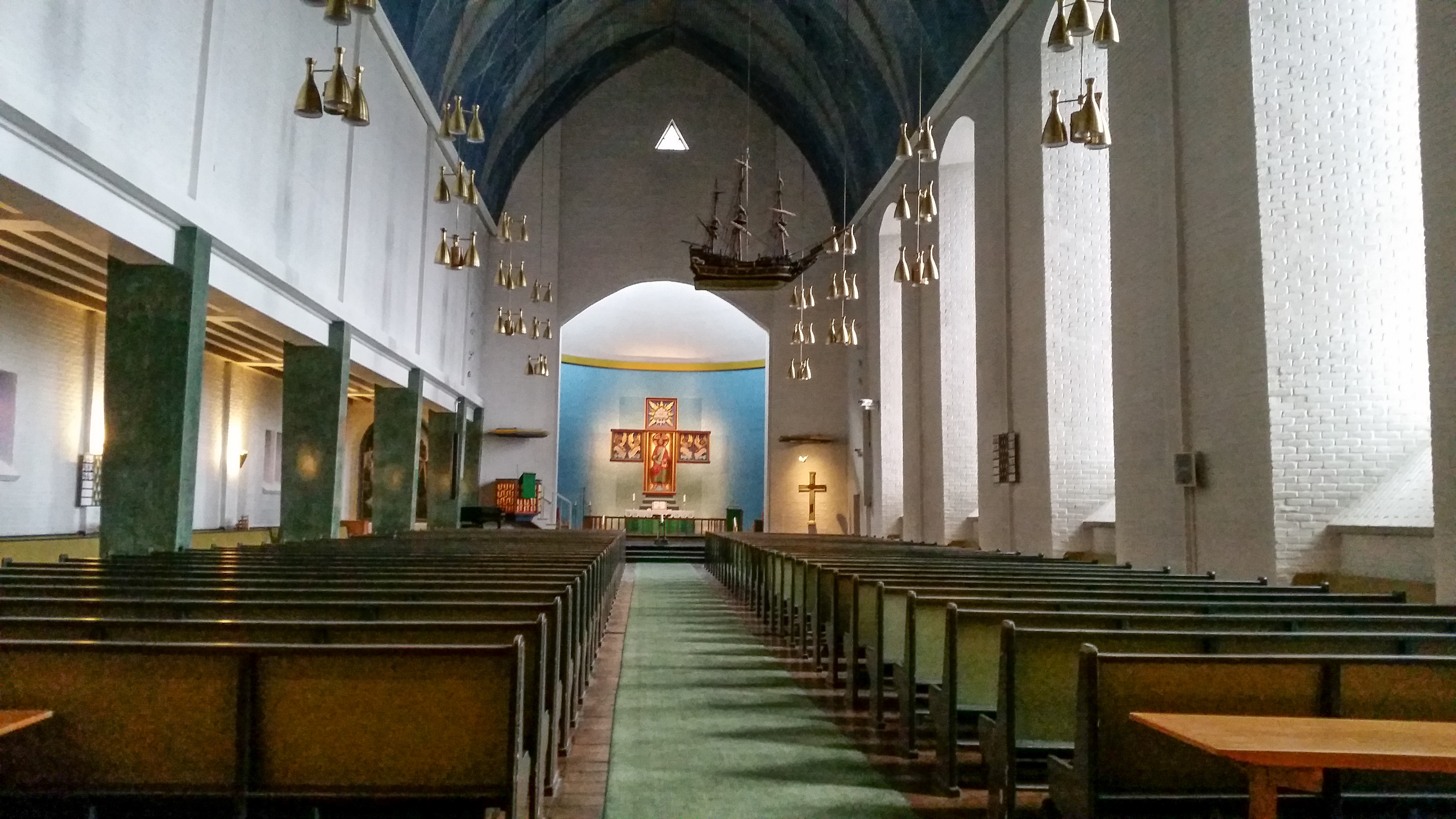
Interior
Previous church building (1887-1940)

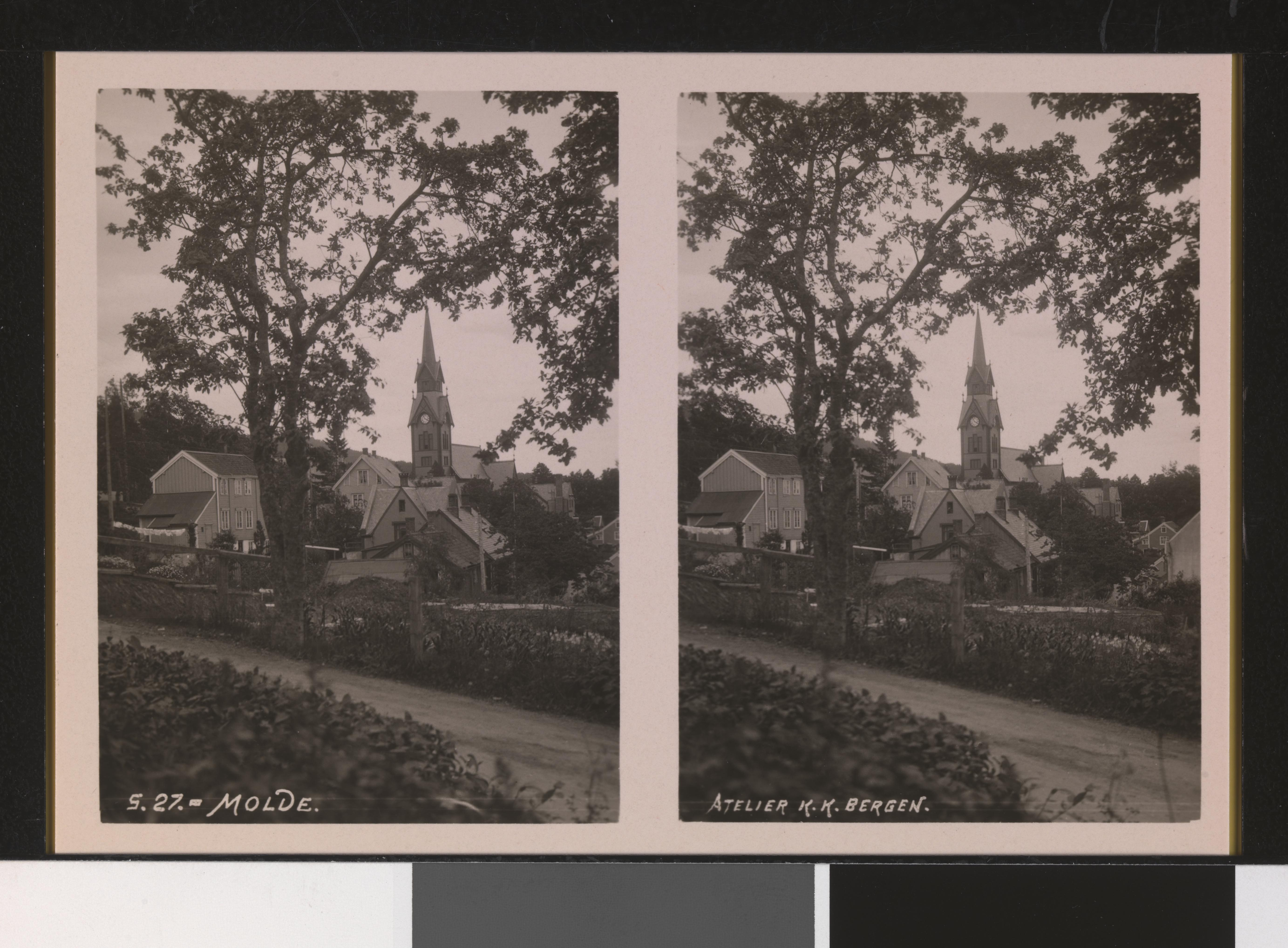
View of the exterior

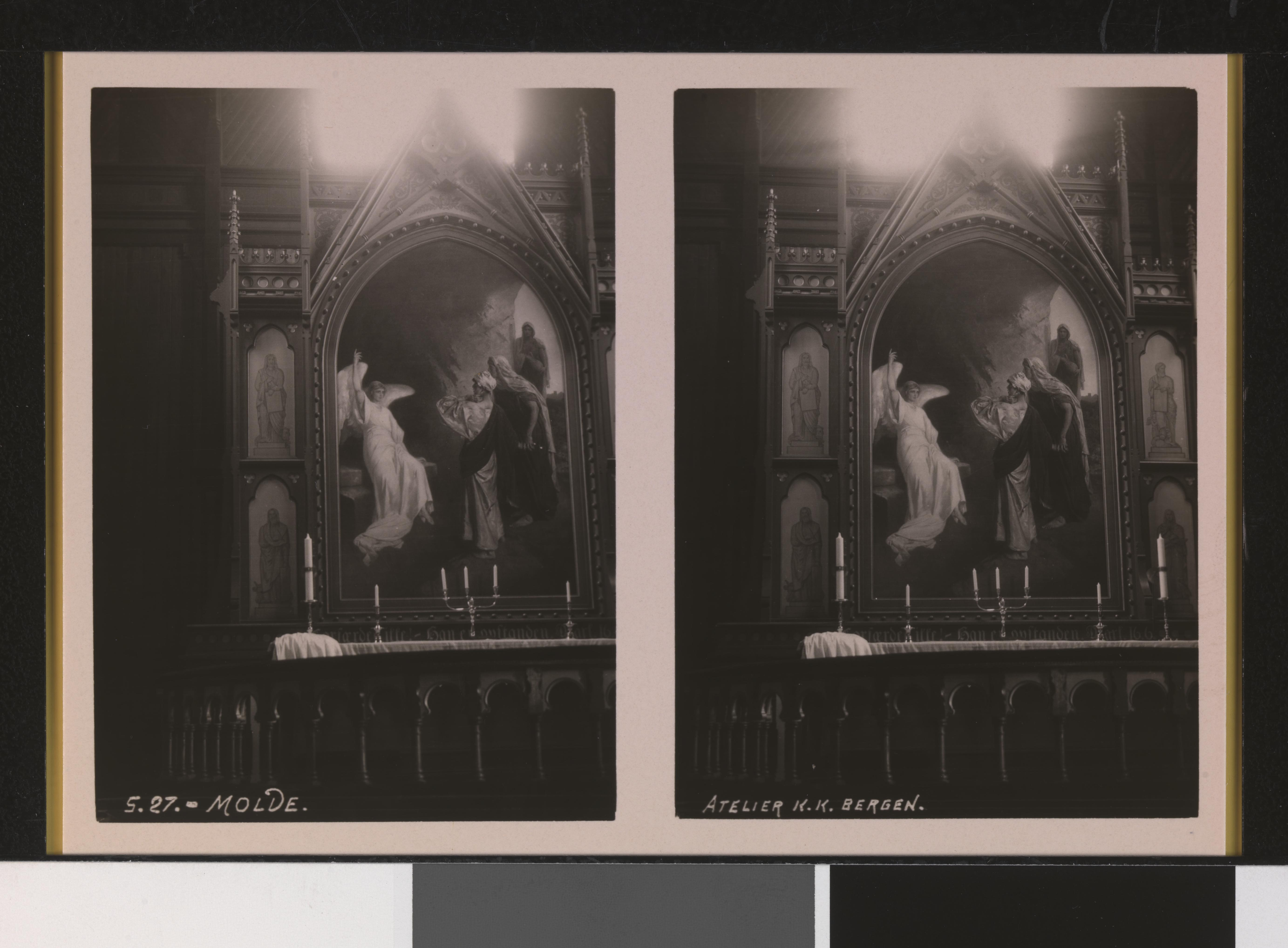
View of the interior altarpiece

== See also ==
- List of cathedrals in Norway
- List of churches in Møre
