= Ingeborg Midttømme =

Norwegian Lutheran bishop

The Right Reverend Ingeborg Synnøve Midttomme
- Bishop of Møre
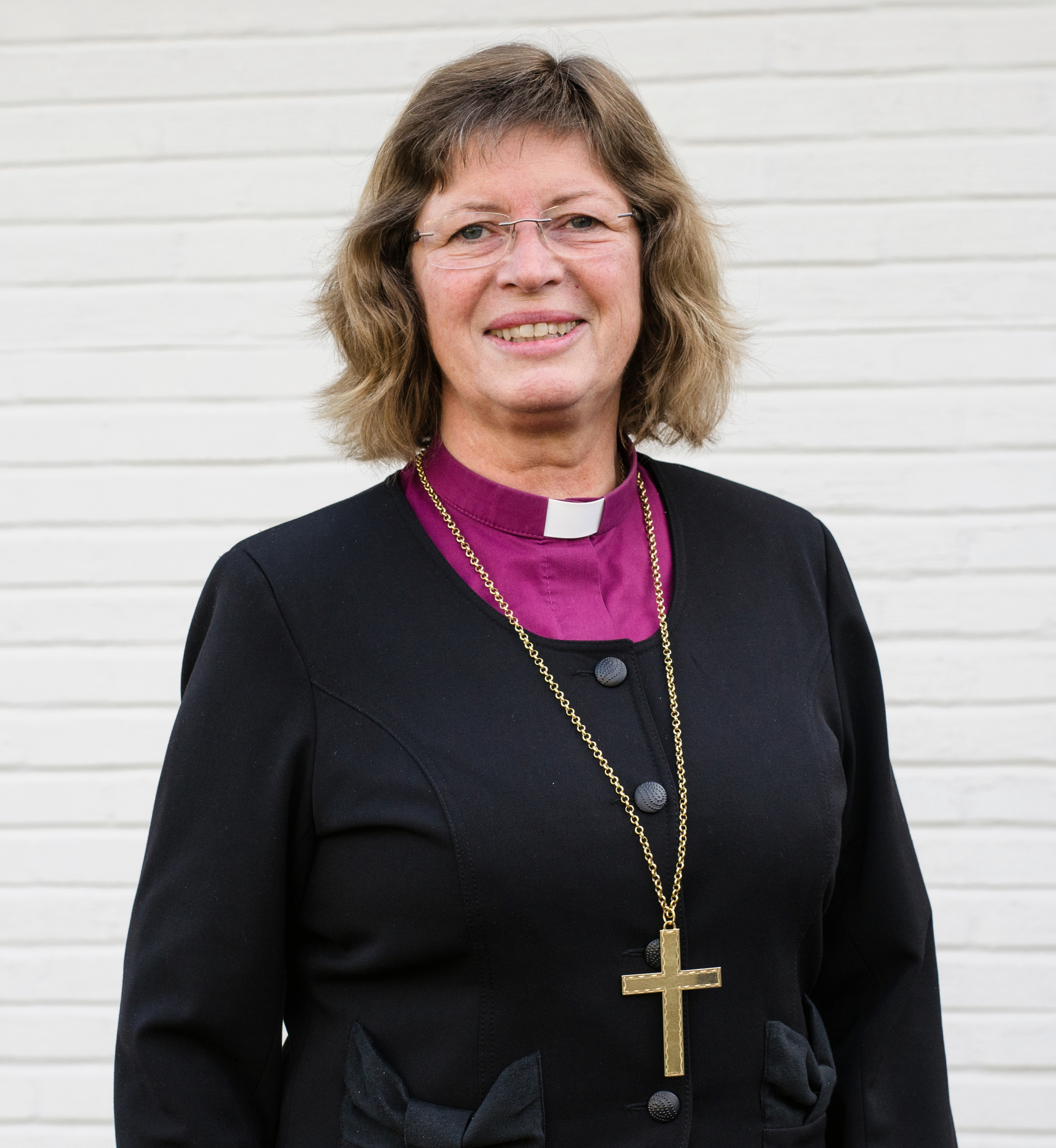
- Church: Church of Norway
- Diocese: Diocese of Møre
- Appointed: 2008
- Predecessor: Odd Bondevik

Orders
- Ordination: 1987
- Consecration: 2008

Personal details
- Born: 20 November 1961 (age 64) Oslo, Norway
- Denomination: Christian
- Residence: Molde, Norway
- Occupation: Priest
- Education: MF Norwegian School of Theology

Ingeborg Synnøve Midttømme (born 20 November 1961) is a Norwegian Lutheran bishop for the Diocese of Møre in the Church of Norway.

== Personal life ==
Midttømme was born in Oslo, Norway on 20 November 1961.

== Career ==
She has been the Bishop since 2008. She was elected as the first female leader of the Norwegian Association of Clergy trade union in 2003.

Midttømme attended the MF Norwegian School of Theology and graduated in 1986. She was ordained as a priest in 1987. She worked in Høybråten Church in Oslo from 1987 until 1993. She then became the parish priest for Sørfold Municipality in the Salten region in Northern Norway from 1993 until 1997. In 1997 she took a chaplain job in Holmlia Church in Oslo. She was appointed Bishop of the Diocese of Møre in 2008.

Religious titles
Preceded by Odd Bondevik	Bishop of Møre; 2008–current	Incumbent
