= Bioforsk =

Norwegian research institute

Coordinates: 59°40′4″N 10°45′57″E

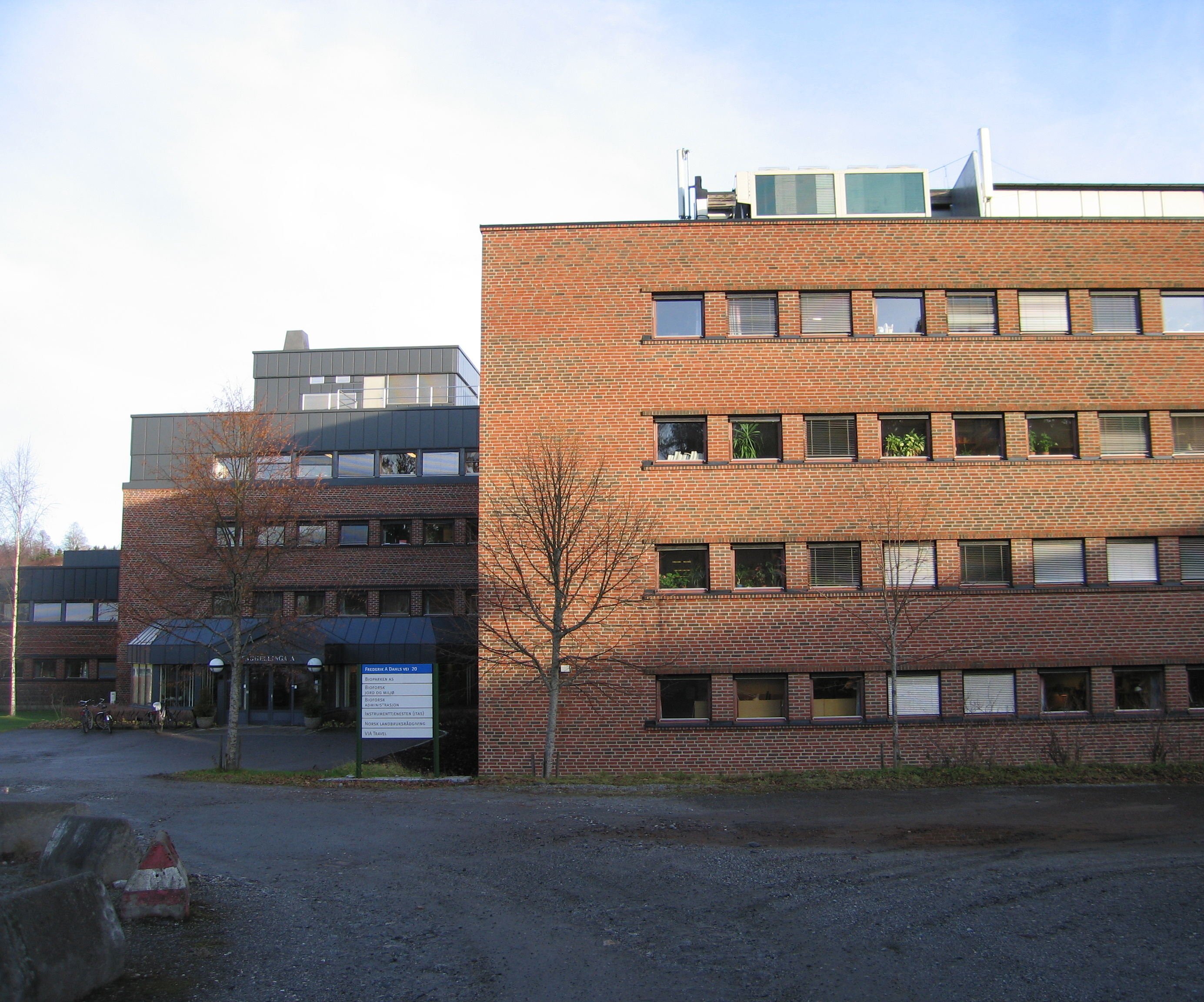
Saghellinga at Ås – both the administration and the majority of Bioforsk Soil and Environment Division were located here.

Norwegian Institute for Agricultural and Environmental Research (Bioforsk) (2006-2015) was a national Norwegian R&D institute specialising in the fields of agriculture and food production, environmental protection and natural resource management. It was established in 2006 as a fusion of the existing research insititutes Jordforsk, NORSØK og Planteforsk. In 2015, Bioforsk became part of the merger that resulted in the Norwegian Institute of Bioeconomy Research (NIBIO).

== Organisation ==
Bioforsk was established on 1 January 2006, after a merger of the Norwegian Centre for Soil and Environmental Research, the Norwegian Institute for Crop Research and the Norwegian Centre for Organic Agriculture. Bioforsk was organised under the Norwegian Ministry of Agriculture and Food. Bioforsk had a staff of about 500.

Bioforsk was organised in seven divisions and had offices across the country, including in Ås, Sør-Varanger, Tingvoll, Østre Toten, Klepp, Ullensvang, Leikanger, Fjaler, Stjørdal, Tromsø, Bodø and Alstahaug. The division of the centre across different regions was seen as important as it ensured local jobs for highly educated inhabitants. For example, Bioforsk Organic (Bioforsk økologisk) was located in Tingvoll in Nordmøre, and in 2012 the local newspaper reported that local politicians were concerned about reorganisation leading to a loss of local jobs. In 2015, there was concern that all 37 employees would lose their jobs. The same year, the Bioforsk board voted to shut down an experimental farm in Fjaler, but massive protests from locals caused the decision to be reversed.

== Fusion ==
The fusion with NIBIO in July 2015 caused research on organic agriculture to cease at Tingvoll, though the office remained as a communications branch.

In 2020, the National Audit Office of Norway released a report criticising the lack of evaluation of whether the fusion had been successful.
