= Tingvoll Municipality =

Municipality in Møre og Romsdal, Norway

Tingvoll Municipality Tingvoll kommune
- Municipality
- Tingvold herred (historic name)
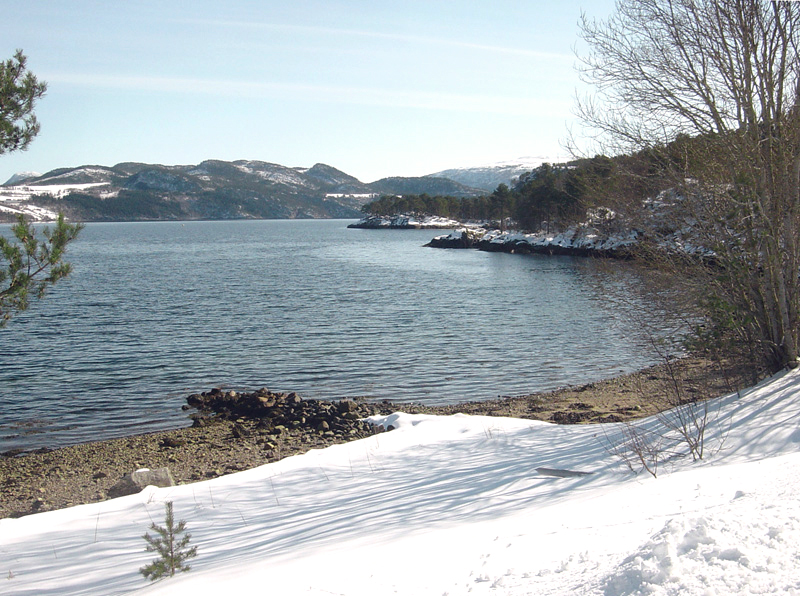
- View of the Tingvollfjorden

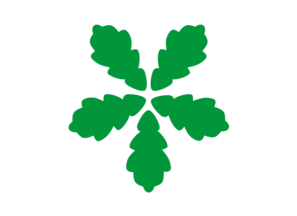
- Flag Coat of arms

- Møre og Romsdal within Norway

- Tingvoll within Møre og Romsdal
- Coordinates: 62°57′13″N 08°13′5″E
- Country: Norway
- County: Møre og Romsdal
- District: Nordmøre
- Established: 1 Jan 1838
  - Created as: Formannskapsdistrikt
- Administrative centre: Tingvollvågen

Government
  - Mayor (2019): Ingrid Waagen (Sp)

Area
  - Total: 336.81 km^{2} (130.04 sq mi)
  - Land: 321.62 km^{2} (124.18 sq mi)
  - Water: 15.19 km^{2} (5.86 sq mi) 4.5%
  - Rank: #253 in Norway
- Highest elevation: 1,173.8 m (3,851 ft)

Population (2024)
  - Total: 3,041
  - Rank: #226 in Norway
  - Density: 9/km^{2} (23/sq mi)
  - Change (10 years): ▼ −0.8%
- Demonym: Tingvollgjelding

Official language
  - Norwegian form: Neutral
- Time zone: UTC+01:00 (CET)
  - Summer (DST): UTC+02:00 (CEST)
- ISO 3166 code: NO-1560
- Website: Official website

Tingvoll is a municipality in Møre og Romsdal county, Norway. It is part of the Nordmøre region. The administrative centre is the village of Tingvollvågen. Other villages include Meisingset, Kvisvik, Grimstad, and Torjulvågen. The municipality encompasses a peninsula on the mainland as well as a few surrounding islands. Norwegian National Road 70 and European route E39 both run through the municipality.

The 337-square-kilometre (130 sq mi) municipality is the 253rd largest by area out of the 357 municipalities in Norway. Tingvoll Municipality is the 226th most populous municipality in Norway with a population of 3,041. The municipality's population density is 9 inhabitants per square kilometre (23/sq mi) and its population has decreased by 0.8% over the previous 10-year period.

== General information ==
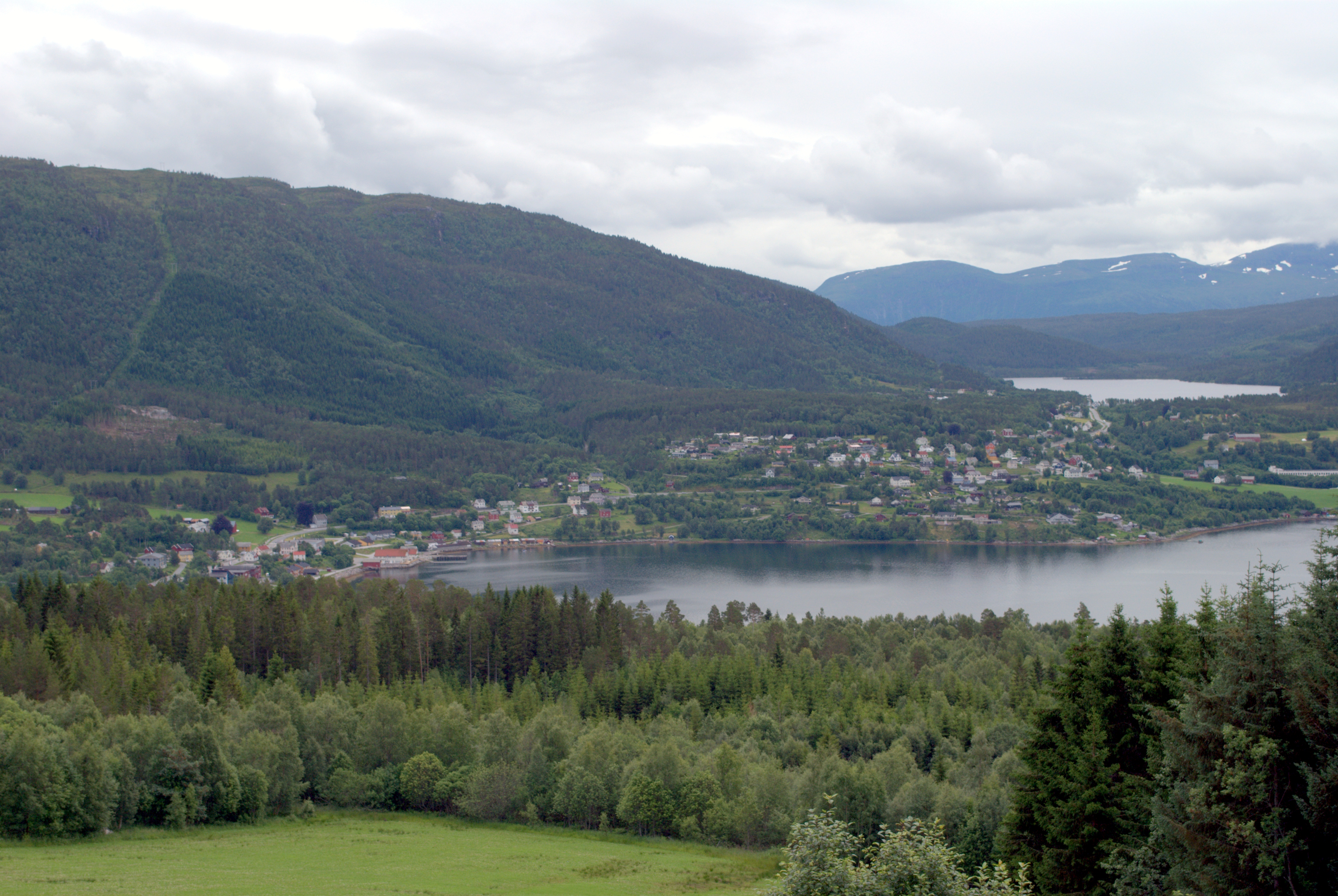
View of Tingvollvågen

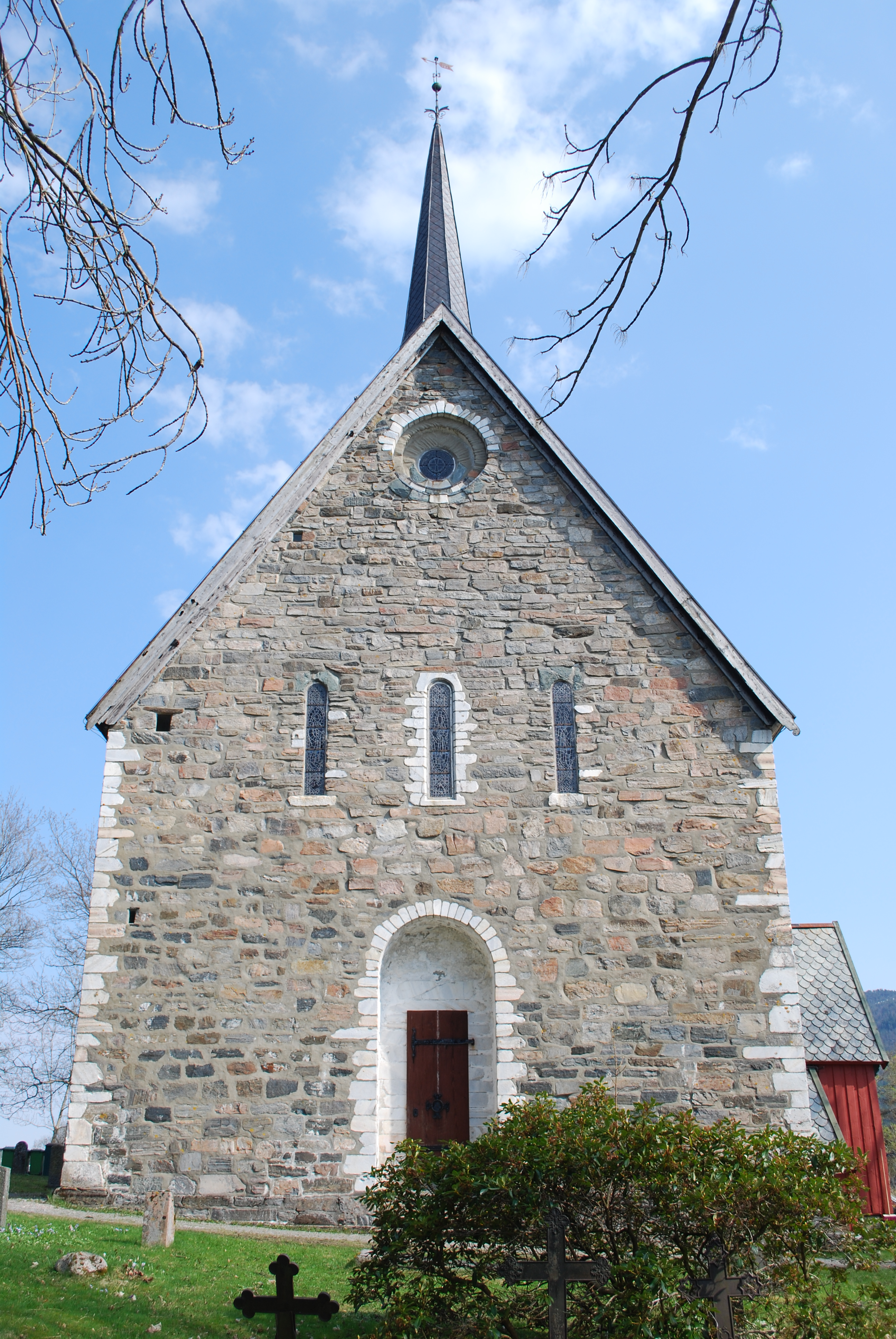
View of Tingvoll Church

The parish of Tingvoll was established as a municipality on 1 January 1838 (see formannskapsdistrikt law). On 1 January 1866, the northern part of the municipality (population: 1,222) was separated to form the new Straumsnes Municipality. On 1 January 1874, a part of Stangvik Municipality (population: 61) was transferred to Tingvoll Municipality. On 1 January 1877, the Tiltereidet and Meisalstranden part of Tingvoll Municipality (population: 212) on the west side of the Sunndalsfjorden was transferred to Nesset Municipality. On 1 January 1880, the Torjulvågen area of Halsa Municipality (population: 240) was transferred to Tingvoll Municipality. On 1 January 1890, the Rausand area of Tingvoll Municipality (population: 101) was transferred to Nesset Municipality.

During the 1960s, there were many municipal mergers across Norway due to the work of the Schei Committee. On 1 January 1964, Straumsnes Municipality (population: 1,160) and the part of Frei Municipality on the island of Aspøya (population: 147) were merged into Tingvoll Municipality. On 1 January 1965, the part of Tingvoll Municipality located on the western side of the Tingvollfjorden (population: 778) was transferred to Gjemnes Municipality and the Åsprong-Sandnes area near Meisingset (population: 26) was transferred from Stangvik Municipality to Tingvoll Municipality.

=== Name ===
The municipality (originally the parish) is named after the old Tingvoll farm (Old Norse: Þingvǫllr) since the first Tingvoll Church was built there. The first element is þing which means "thing" or "assembly". The last element is vǫllr which means "meadow" or "flat ground" (so Tingvoll means "meeting place", like Þingvellir in Iceland). Historically, the name of the municipality was spelled Tingvold. On 3 November 1917, a royal resolution changed the spelling of the name of the municipality to Tingvoll.

=== Coat of arms ===
The coat of arms was granted on 7 September 1984. The official blazon is "Argent, five oak leaves vert in annulo stems to centre" (Norwegian: I sølv fem grønne eikeblad i rosett). This means the arms have a field (background) has a tincture of argent which means it is commonly colored white, but if it is made out of metal, then silver is used. The charge is a group of five oak leaves arranged in a circle with their stems pointing to the centre. The oak leaves were chosen as a symbol since Norway's northernmost autochthonous oak forests can be found in the municipality. Each leaf represents one of the five main villages in the municipality: Tingvollvågen, Straumsnes, Gyl, Torjulvågen, and Meisingset. The arms were designed by Alvhild Ulseth. The municipal flag has the same design as the coat of arms.

=== Churches ===
The Church of Norway has two parishes (sokn) within Tingvoll Municipality. It is part of the Indre Nordmøre prosti (deanery) in the Diocese of Møre.

Churches in Tingvoll Municipality
Parish (sokn)	Church name	Location of the church	Year built
Tingvoll	Tingvoll Church	Tingvollvågen	c. 1180
Straumsnes	Straumsnes Church	Grimstad	1864
Straumsnes	Langøy Chapel	Langøya	1935

== History ==
Eight or nine centuries ago, Tingvoll was the site of the Nordmøre Ting. There was a flat field there, which in Norwegian is called voll. It was here that meetings were held, called ting, thus the name Tingvoll. The name has the same origin as the Scottish town of Dingwall, the parliament of the Isle of Man Tynwald, the English town of Thingwall (which Norwegian Vikings colonised), Wirral Peninsula, and Þingvellir in Iceland.

Tingvoll Church, also known as the Nordmøre Cathedral (Norwegian: Nordmørsdomen), was built around 1180 at the village of Tingvollvågen.

== Government ==
Tingvoll Municipality is responsible for primary education (through 10th grade), outpatient health services, senior citizen services, welfare and other social services, zoning, economic development, and municipal roads and utilities. The municipality is governed by a municipal council of directly elected representatives. The mayor is indirectly elected by a vote of the municipal council. The municipality is under the jurisdiction of the Nordmøre og Romsdal District Court and the Frostating Court of Appeal. Waste management was provided by the inter-municipal agency Nordmøre Interkommunale Renovasjonsselskap until 2020, after which it merged into ReMidt. Waste collection has since 2018 been operated by ReTrans Midt.

=== Municipal council ===
The municipal council (Kommunestyre) of Tingvoll Municipality is made up of 21 representatives that are elected to four year terms. The tables below show the current and historical composition of the council by political party.

Tingvoll kommunestyre 2023–2027
Party name (in Norwegian)	Number of representatives
Labour Party (Arbeiderpartiet)	4
Progress Party (Fremskrittspartiet)	4
Green Party (Miljøpartiet De Grønne)	1
Centre Party (Senterpartiet)	8
Socialist Left Party (Sosialistisk Venstreparti)	1
Joint list of the Conservative Party (Høyre), Christian Democratic Party (Kristelig Folkeparti), and Liberal Party (Venstre)	3
Total number of members:	21

Tingvoll kommunestyre 2019–2023
Party name (in Norwegian)	Number of representatives
Labour Party (Arbeiderpartiet)	7
Progress Party (Fremskrittspartiet)	2
Green Party (Miljøpartiet De Grønne)	2
Conservative Party (Høyre)	2
Christian Democratic Party (Kristelig Folkeparti)	3
Centre Party (Senterpartiet)	8
Liberal Party (Venstre)	1
Total number of members:	25

Tingvoll kommunestyre 2015–2019
Party name (in Norwegian)	Number of representatives
Labour Party (Arbeiderpartiet)	7
Progress Party (Fremskrittspartiet)	3
Green Party (Miljøpartiet De Grønne)	1
Conservative Party (Høyre)	2
Christian Democratic Party (Kristelig Folkeparti)	5
Centre Party (Senterpartiet)	6
Liberal Party (Venstre)	1
Total number of members:	25

Tingvoll kommunestyre 2011–2015
Party name (in Norwegian)	Number of representatives
Labour Party (Arbeiderpartiet)	7
Progress Party (Fremskrittspartiet)	3
Conservative Party (Høyre)	4
Christian Democratic Party (Kristelig Folkeparti)	2
Centre Party (Senterpartiet)	7
Liberal Party (Venstre)	2
Total number of members:	25

Tingvoll kommunestyre 2007–2011
Party name (in Norwegian)	Number of representatives
Labour Party (Arbeiderpartiet)	8
Progress Party (Fremskrittspartiet)	4
Conservative Party (Høyre)	4
Christian Democratic Party (Kristelig Folkeparti)	2
Centre Party (Senterpartiet)	6
Liberal Party (Venstre)	1
Total number of members:	25

Tingvoll kommunestyre 2003–2007
Party name (in Norwegian)	Number of representatives
Labour Party (Arbeiderpartiet)	5
Progress Party (Fremskrittspartiet)	4
Conservative Party (Høyre)	3
Christian Democratic Party (Kristelig Folkeparti)	2
Centre Party (Senterpartiet)	8
Socialist Left Party (Sosialistisk Venstreparti)	1
Liberal Party (Venstre)	2
Total number of members:	25

Tingvoll kommunestyre 1999–2003
Party name (in Norwegian)	Number of representatives
Labour Party (Arbeiderpartiet)	8
Conservative Party (Høyre)	2
Christian Democratic Party (Kristelig Folkeparti)	4
Centre Party (Senterpartiet)	8
Socialist Left Party (Sosialistisk Venstreparti)	1
Liberal Party (Venstre)	2
Total number of members:	25

Tingvoll kommunestyre 1995–1999
Party name (in Norwegian)	Number of representatives
Labour Party (Arbeiderpartiet)	10
Conservative Party (Høyre)	3
Christian Democratic Party (Kristelig Folkeparti)	2
Centre Party (Senterpartiet)	8
Socialist Left Party (Sosialistisk Venstreparti)	1
Liberal Party (Venstre)	1
Total number of members:	25

Tingvoll kommunestyre 1991–1995
Party name (in Norwegian)	Number of representatives
Labour Party (Arbeiderpartiet)	10
Conservative Party (Høyre)	2
Christian Democratic Party (Kristelig Folkeparti)	2
Centre Party (Senterpartiet)	8
Socialist Left Party (Sosialistisk Venstreparti)	2
Liberal Party (Venstre)	1
Total number of members:	25

Tingvoll kommunestyre 1987–1991
Party name (in Norwegian)	Number of representatives
Labour Party (Arbeiderpartiet)	12
Conservative Party (Høyre)	3
Christian Democratic Party (Kristelig Folkeparti)	3
Centre Party (Senterpartiet)	4
Socialist Left Party (Sosialistisk Venstreparti)	1
Liberal Party (Venstre)	2
Total number of members:	25

Tingvoll kommunestyre 1983–1987
Party name (in Norwegian)	Number of representatives
Labour Party (Arbeiderpartiet)	11
Conservative Party (Høyre)	3
Christian Democratic Party (Kristelig Folkeparti)	3
Centre Party (Senterpartiet)	5
Socialist Left Party (Sosialistisk Venstreparti)	1
Liberal Party (Venstre)	2
Total number of members:	25

Tingvoll kommunestyre 1979–1983
Party name (in Norwegian)	Number of representatives
Labour Party (Arbeiderpartiet)	9
Conservative Party (Høyre)	4
Christian Democratic Party (Kristelig Folkeparti)	4
Centre Party (Senterpartiet)	5
Socialist Left Party (Sosialistisk Venstreparti)	1
Liberal Party (Venstre)	2
Total number of members:	25

Tingvoll kommunestyre 1975–1979
Party name (in Norwegian)	Number of representatives
Labour Party (Arbeiderpartiet)	8
Christian Democratic Party (Kristelig Folkeparti)	4
Centre Party (Senterpartiet)	7
Socialist Left Party (Sosialistisk Venstreparti)	1
Liberal Party (Venstre)	2
Free Voters List (Frie Velgeres Liste)	3
Total number of members:	25

Tingvoll kommunestyre 1971–1975
Party name (in Norwegian)	Number of representatives
Labour Party (Arbeiderpartiet)	10
Conservative Party (Høyre)	1
Christian Democratic Party (Kristelig Folkeparti)	4
Centre Party (Senterpartiet)	7
Liberal Party (Venstre)	3
Total number of members:	25

Tingvoll kommunestyre 1967–1971
Party name (in Norwegian)	Number of representatives
Labour Party (Arbeiderpartiet)	12
Conservative Party (Høyre)	1
Christian Democratic Party (Kristelig Folkeparti)	4
Centre Party (Senterpartiet)	5
Liberal Party (Venstre)	3
Total number of members:	25

Tingvoll kommunestyre 1963–1967
Party name (in Norwegian)	Number of representatives
Labour Party (Arbeiderpartiet)	13
Conservative Party (Høyre)	1
Christian Democratic Party (Kristelig Folkeparti)	4
Centre Party (Senterpartiet)	7
Liberal Party (Venstre)	4
Total number of members:	29

Tingvoll herredsstyre 1959–1963
Party name (in Norwegian)	Number of representatives
Labour Party (Arbeiderpartiet)	9
Christian Democratic Party (Kristelig Folkeparti)	4
Centre Party (Senterpartiet)	5
Liberal Party (Venstre)	3
Total number of members:	21

Tingvoll herredsstyre 1955–1959
Party name (in Norwegian)	Number of representatives
Labour Party (Arbeiderpartiet)	9
Christian Democratic Party (Kristelig Folkeparti)	4
Farmers' Party (Bondepartiet)	5
Liberal Party (Venstre)	2
Local List(s) (Lokale lister)	1
Total number of members:	21

Tingvoll herredsstyre 1951–1955
Party name (in Norwegian)	Number of representatives
Labour Party (Arbeiderpartiet)	9
Christian Democratic Party (Kristelig Folkeparti)	5
Joint List(s) of Non-Socialist Parties (Borgerlige Felleslister)	6
Total number of members:	20

Tingvoll herredsstyre 1947–1951
Party name (in Norwegian)	Number of representatives
Labour Party (Arbeiderpartiet)	9
Joint List(s) of Non-Socialist Parties (Borgerlige Felleslister)	11
Total number of members:	20

Tingvoll herredsstyre 1945–1947
Party name (in Norwegian)	Number of representatives
Labour Party (Arbeiderpartiet)	9
Christian Democratic Party (Kristelig Folkeparti)	4
Local List(s) (Lokale lister)	7
Total number of members:	20

Tingvoll herredsstyre 1937–1941*
Party name (in Norwegian)	Number of representatives
Labour Party (Arbeiderpartiet)	9
Farmers' Party (Bondepartiet)	6
Liberal Party (Venstre)	5
Total number of members:	20
Note: Due to the German occupation of Norway during World War II, no elections were held for new municipal councils until after the war ended in 1945.

=== Mayors ===
The mayor (Norwegian: ordfører) of Tingvoll is the political leader of the municipality and the chairperson of the municipal council. Here is a list of people who have held this position:

- 1838–1839: Anders Larsen
- 1840–1843: Fanejunker Bjerkhol
- 1844–1847: J. Bugge
- 1848–1851: P. Hofflund
- 1852–1854: A. Bjerkhol
- 1854–1855: Peder I. Kjærivik
- 1856–1856: Karlsen
- 1856–1857: Markus Sæthem
- 1858–1861: H. Brodkorp
- 1862–1863: Markus Sæthem
- 1864–1873: Anders Koksvik
- 1874–1877: John Sæther
- 1878–1879: Lars A. Koksvik
- 1880–1883: Lars Solli
- 1884–1887: L. Nilsen
- 1888–1895: Hans Meisingset
- 1896–1897: Lars Meisingset
- 1898–1898: Lars Koksvik
- 1899–1904: Lars Meisingset
- 1905–1922: Lars Gjøvik
- 1923–1925: A.L. Koksvik
- 1926–1928: Lars Gjøvik
- 1929–1934: O.K Varvik
- 1935–1937: Magnus Skeid
- 1938–1940: O.H. Drøpping
- 1941–1943: Petter Grinde
- 1943–1945: Kristian Kindsbekken
- 1945–1945: O.H. Drøpping
- 1946–1951: Magnus Skeid
- 1952–1955: L.B. Flemmen
- 1956–1959: Steinar Stomsvik
- 1960–1963: John Th. Angvik
- 1964–1965: Steinar Stomsvik
- 1966–1967: Sverke Romundstad
- 1968–1969: Oddmund Tveikra
- 1970–1971: Jon Resell
- 1972–1975: Sverke Romundstad
- 1976–1979: Per Kamsvåg
- 1980–1983: Ivar Bølset
- 1984–1987: Rasmus Sørheim
- 1988–1995: Einar Lund
- 1996–1999: Lars Jostein Holten
- 1999–2007: Kristin Sørheim
- 2007–2011: Ole Morten Sørvik (H)
- 2011–2015: Peder Hanem Aasprang (Sp)
- 2015–2019: Milly Bente Nørsett (Ap)
- 2019–present: Ingrid Waagen (Sp)

== Geography ==
Tingvoll Municipality encompasses a large peninsula surrounded by the Tingvollfjorden, Vinjefjorden, Freifjorden, Halsafjorden, and Trongfjorden. The municipality also includes some islands including Aspøya. The Bergsøysund Bridge (part of the European route E39 highway) connects Aspøya to the neighboring island of Bergsøya to the west. The highest point in the municipality is the 1,173.8-metre (3,851 ft) tall mountain Smisetnebba on the border with Sunndal Municipality.

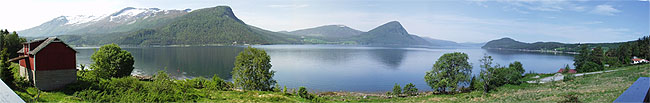
Ålvundfjorden sett frå Ålvund.

== Climate ==
Tingvoll has a temperate oceanic climate (Cfb in the Köppen climate classification), also known as a marine west coast climate. The wettest season is autumn and early winter. The driest season is spring. The average daily high temperature varies from about 3 °C (37 °F) in January and February to 19 °C (66 °F) in July. The all-time high is 32.9 °C (91.2 °F) recorded 9 July 2014. In February 2001 a low of −18 °C (0 °F) was recorded. Earlier weather stations have recorded colder lows. The Tingvoll weather station started recording January 1992.

Climate data for Tingvoll 1991–2020 (23 m)
Month	Jan	Feb	Mar	Apr	May	Jun	Jul	Aug	Sep	Oct	Nov	Dec	Year
Daily mean °C (°F)	0.7 (33.3)	0.5 (32.9)	2.1 (35.8)	5.4 (41.7)	9 (48)	12.3 (54.1)	15 (59)	14.5 (58.1)	11.2 (52.2)	6.4 (43.5)	3.3 (37.9)	0.8 (33.4)	6.8 (44.2)
Average precipitation mm (inches)	80 (3.1)	90 (3.5)	102 (4.0)	78 (3.1)	87 (3.4)	99 (3.9)	104 (4.1)	121 (4.8)	133 (5.2)	132 (5.2)	100 (3.9)	119 (4.7)	1,245 (48.9)
Source: yr.no/Met.no

== Eco-municipality ==
Tingvoll has been a self declared eco-municipality since 1990, when the municipal council (Kommunestyre) signed the declaration. The movement of eco-municipalities started among rural municipalities in Finland and later in Sweden in the 1980s. The idea was to inspire local economic and cultural development within a sustainable framework. In Tingvoll, the work started with a program for environmental education of the members of the council and the executive officers. The schools adapted national programs for environmental education.

A main part of the early years of eco-municipality, was the program for composting waste from the households. A new type of insulated bin was developed (Hagakompen) to assure composting could handle meat and fish waste, and work well in wintertime as well.

The Bioforsk Organic Food and Farming Division is located at Tingvoll.

== Notable people ==
- Martha G. Thorwick (1863 in Tingvoll — 1921), an American clubwoman and medical doctor based in San Francisco
- Gunvor Hals (born 1953 in Tingvoll), a television personality
- Nils Erik Ulset (born 1983 in Tingvoll), a biathlete, cross-country skier, and three-time Paralympic Champion

== Sister cities ==
Tingvoll has sister city agreements with the following places:

- Bunda Town, Bunda District, Tanzania
