= Straumsnes Church =

Church in Møre og Romsdal, Norway

- Straumsnes kyrkje
- Grimstad kyrkje
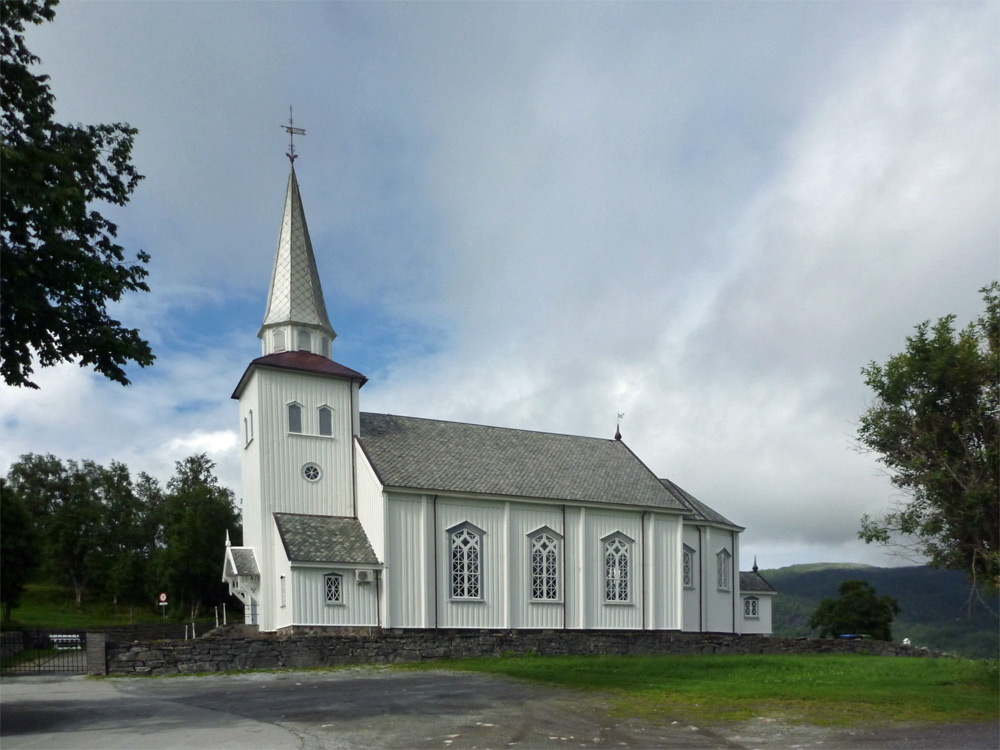
- View of the church
- Straumsnes Church
- 63.0526177398°N 8.0242413282°E
- Location: Tingvoll Municipality, Møre og Romsdal
- Country: Norway
- Denomination: Church of Norway
- Churchmanship: Evangelical Lutheran

History
- Status: Parish church
- Founded: 1864
- Consecrated: 7 October 1864

Architecture
- Functional status: Active
- Architect: Gustav Olsen
- Architectural type: Long church
- Completed: 1864 (162 years ago)

Specifications
- Capacity: 300
- Materials: Wood

Administration
- Diocese: Møre bispedømme
- Deanery: Indre Nordmøre prosti
- Parish: Straumsnes
- Norwegian Cultural Heritage Site
- Type: Church
- Status: Not protected
- ID: 85604

Straumsnes Church (Norwegian: Straumsnes kyrkje) is a parish church of the Church of Norway in Tingvoll Municipality in Møre og Romsdal county, Norway. It is located in the village of Straumsnes. It is the main church for the Straumsnes parish which is part of the Indre Nordmøre prosti (deanery) in the Diocese of Møre. The white, wooden church was built in a long church style in 1864 by the architect Gustav Olsen. The church seats about 300 people.

== History ==
The parish of Straumsnes was established by royal resolution on 14 January 1863. Soon after, plans were made for a new church to be built for the parish. The church was designed by Gustav Olsen (who also designed the nearby Øre Church), and the lead builder during the construction was Lars Thoresen. The church was built in 1863-1864 and it was consecrated on 7 October 1864. In 1946, a baptismal sacristy was added. The church was damaged by a lightning strike in 2006 and it had to be restored afterwards.

== See also ==
- List of churches in Møre
