= Straumsnes Municipality =

Former municipality in Møre og Romsdal, Norway

Straumsnes Municipality Straumsnes herred
- Former municipality
- Strømsneset herred (historic name)
- Møre og Romsdal within Norway

- Straumsnes within Møre og Romsdal
- Coordinates: 63°03′08″N 08°01′29″E
- Country: Norway
- County: Møre og Romsdal
- District: Nordmøre
- Established: 1 Jan 1866
  - Preceded by: Tingvoll Municipality
- Disestablished: 1 Jan 1964
  - Succeeded by: Tingvoll Municipality
- Administrative centre: Straumsnes

Area (upon dissolution)
  - Total: 118.6 km^{2} (45.8 sq mi)
  - Rank: #484 in Norway
- Highest elevation: 670 m (2,200 ft)

Population (1963)
  - Total: 1,160
  - Rank: #587 in Norway
  - Density: 9.8/km^{2} (25/sq mi)
  - Change (10 years): ▼ −5.9%
- Demonym: Straumsnesing

Official language
  - Norwegian form: Neutral
- Time zone: UTC+01:00 (CET)
  - Summer (DST): UTC+02:00 (CEST)
- ISO 3166 code: NO-1559

Straumsnes is a former municipality in Møre og Romsdal county, Norway. The 118.6-square-kilometre (45.8 sq mi) municipality existed from 1866 until its dissolution in 1964. It included the northern part of the Tingvoll peninsula, the eastern part of the island of Aspøya, and several surrounding islands in the northern part of the present-day Tingvoll Municipality. The administrative centre of the municipality was the village of Straumsnes where the Straumsnes Church is located.

Prior to its dissolution in 1964, the 118.6-square-kilometre (45.8 sq mi) municipality was the 484th largest by area out of the 689 municipalities in Norway. Straumsnes Municipality was the 587th most populous municipality in Norway with a population of about 1,160. The municipality's population density was 9.8 inhabitants per square kilometre (25/sq mi) and its population had decreased by 5.9% over the previous 10-year period.

== General information ==
On 1 January 1866, the parish of Straumsnes was separated from Tingvoll Municipality to become the new Straumsnes Municipality. The initial population of Straumsnes was 1,222. On 1 January 1868, an uninhabited district of Halsa Municipality was transferred to Straumsnes Municipality. During the 1960s, there were many municipal mergers across Norway due to the work of the Schei Committee. On 1 January 1964, Straumsnes Municipality (population: 1,160), the part of Frei Municipality on the island of Aspøya (population: 147), and Tingvoll Municipality (population: 3,356) were merged into a new, larger Tingvoll Municipality.

=== Name ===
The municipality (originally the parish) is named Straumsnes. The first element is staumr which means "stream" or "current/tide". This part comes from old Strøm farm (Old Norse: Straumr), now part of the village of Kanestraum. The last element is nes which means "headland". Historically, the name of the municipality was spelled Strømsneset. On 3 November 1917, a royal resolution changed the spelling of the name of the municipality to Straumsnes, changing the vowel spelling and removing the definite form ending -et.

=== Churches ===
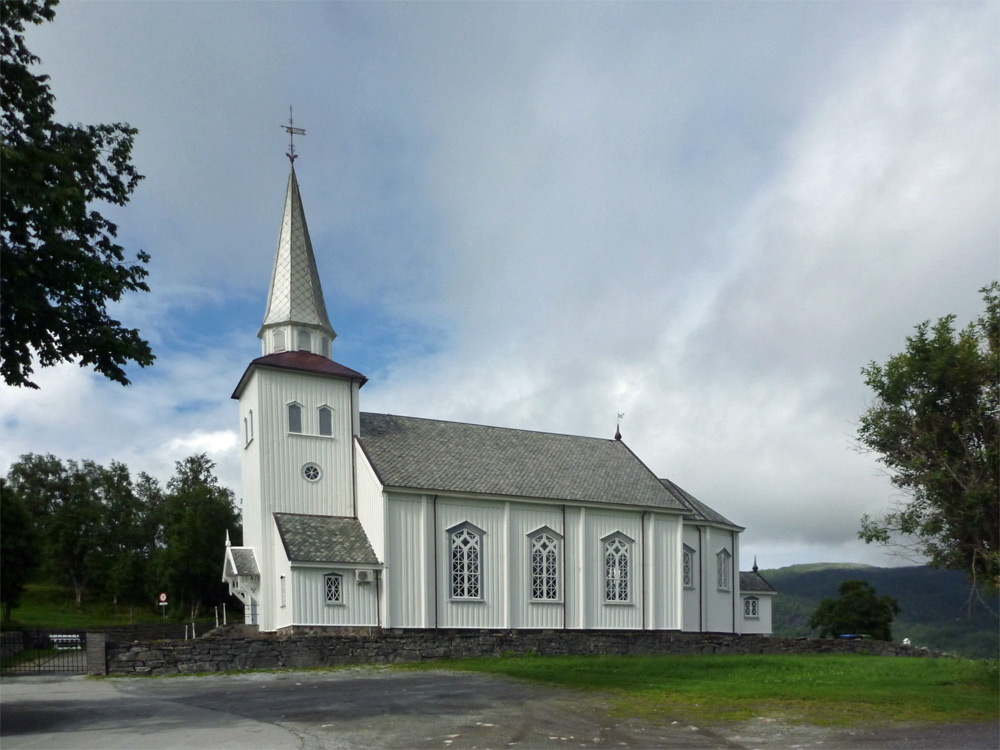
Straumsnes Church

The Church of Norway had one parish (sokn) within Straumsnes Municipality. At the time of the municipal dissolution, it was part of the Tingvoll prestegjeld and the Indre Nordmøre prosti (deanery) in the Diocese of Nidaros.

Churches in Straumsnes Municipality
| Parish (sokn) | Church name | Location of the church | Year built |
|---|---|---|---|
| Straumsnes | Straumsnes Church | Grimstad | 1864 |

== Geography ==
The municipality was located at the northern end of the Straumsnes peninsula. It was surrounded by the Halsafjorden, Vinjefjorden, Freifjorden, and Tingvollfjorden. Tingvoll Municipality was located to the south and Frei Municipality was to the west. Tustna Municipality was to the north (across a fjord) and Halsa Municipality was to the east (across another fjord). The highest point in the municipality was the 670-metre (2,200 ft) tall mountain Kamsvågfjellet on the border with Tingvoll Municipality.

== Government ==
While it existed, Straumsnes Municipality was responsible for primary education (through 10th grade), outpatient health services, senior citizen services, welfare and other social services, zoning, economic development, and municipal roads and utilities. The municipality was governed by a municipal council of directly elected representatives. The mayor was indirectly elected by a vote of the municipal council. The municipality was under the jurisdiction of the Frostating Court of Appeal.

=== Municipal council ===
The municipal council (Herredsstyre) of Straumsnes Municipality was made up of 17 representatives that were elected to four-year terms. The tables below show the historical composition of the council by political party.

Straumsnes herredsstyre 1959–1963
| Party name (in Norwegian) | Number of representatives |
|---|---|
| Labour Party (Arbeiderpartiet) | 7 |
| Conservative Party (Høyre) | 1 |
| Centre Party (Senterpartiet) | 7 |
| Liberal Party (Venstre) | 2 |
| Total number of members: | 17 |

Straumsnes herredsstyre 1955–1959
| Party name (in Norwegian) | Number of representatives |
|---|---|
| Labour Party (Arbeiderpartiet) | 7 |
| Conservative Party (Høyre) | 1 |
| Christian Democratic Party (Kristelig Folkeparti) | 1 |
| Farmers' Party (Bondepartiet) | 5 |
| Liberal Party (Venstre) | 3 |
| Total number of members: | 17 |

Straumsnes herredsstyre 1951–1955
| Party name (in Norwegian) | Number of representatives |
|---|---|
| Labour Party (Arbeiderpartiet) | 6 |
| Christian Democratic Party (Kristelig Folkeparti) | 2 |
| Farmers' Party (Bondepartiet) | 5 |
| Liberal Party (Venstre) | 3 |
| Total number of members: | 16 |

Straumsnes herredsstyre 1947–1951
| Party name (in Norwegian) | Number of representatives |
|---|---|
| Labour Party (Arbeiderpartiet) | 6 |
| Christian Democratic Party (Kristelig Folkeparti) | 2 |
| Farmers' Party (Bondepartiet) | 6 |
| Liberal Party (Venstre) | 2 |
| Total number of members: | 16 |

Straumsnes herredsstyre 1945–1947
| Party name (in Norwegian) | Number of representatives |
|---|---|
| Labour Party (Arbeiderpartiet) | 6 |
| Farmers' Party (Bondepartiet) | 5 |
| Joint List(s) of Non-Socialist Parties (Borgerlige Felleslister) | 2 |
| Local List(s) (Lokale lister) | 3 |
| Total number of members: | 16 |

Straumsnes herredsstyre 1937–1941*
| Party name (in Norwegian) | Number of representatives |
|---|---|
| Labour Party (Arbeiderpartiet) | 4 |
| Farmers' Party (Bondepartiet) | 7 |
| Liberal Party (Venstre) | 3 |
| Joint List(s) of Non-Socialist Parties (Borgerlige Felleslister) | 2 |
| Total number of members: | 16 |
Note: Due to the German occupation of Norway during World War II, no elections were held for new municipal councils until after the war ended in 1945.

=== Mayors ===
The mayor (Norwegian: ordfører) of Straumsnes Municipality was the political leader of the municipality and the chairperson of the municipal council. The following people have held this position:

- 1866–1881: Ole Nilssen
- 1882–1897: Iver Kjærvig
- 1898–1898: Peder Kamsvaag
- 1899–1901: Iver Kjærvig
- 1902–1913: Nils Ulset
- 1914–1916: Peder Kamsvaag
- 1917–1922: Peder Hals
- 1923–1928: Lars Romundstad
- 1929–1931: Lars Vatten
- 1932–1934: Lars Romundstad
- 1935–1940: Nils Kamsvåg
- 1941–1942: Anders A. Grimstad
- 1943–1945: Erik J. Ulset
- 1945–1947: Anders A. Grimstad
- 1948–1951: Jon Nørbech
- 1952–1957: Tore P. Hals
- 1958–1959: Peder Kanestrøm
- 1960–1963: Sverke Romundstad

== See also ==
- List of former municipalities of Norway
