= Holmlia Church =

Coordinates: 59°50′9.7″N 10°47′34.8″E

- Holmlia kirke
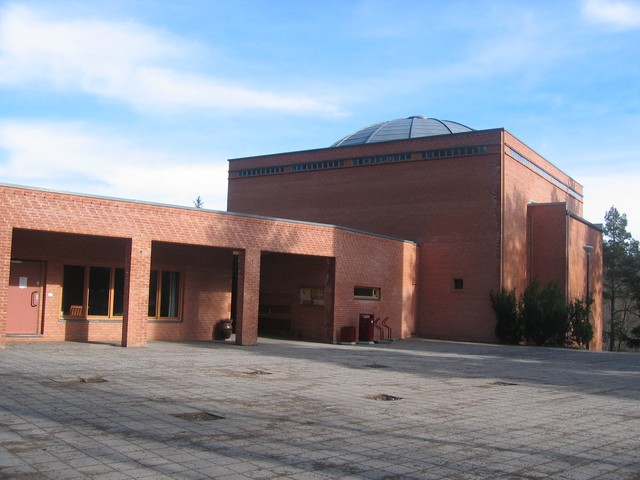

- Location within Norway
- Location: Ravnåsveien 28, Holmlia, Oslo,
- Country: Norway
- Denomination: Church of Norway
- Churchmanship: Evangelical Lutheran
- Website: kirken.no/holmlia

History
- Status: Parish church
- Consecrated: 1993

Architecture
- Functional status: Active
- Architect: Harald Hille
- Style: Postmodernism

Specifications
- Materials: Brick

Administration
- Diocese: Diocese of Oslo
- Deanery: Søndre Aker
- Parish: Holmlia

Holmlia Church is a church center in the southeastern part of Oslo, Norway. The church is run by the Church of Norway, and is also used by the Roman Catholic St. Hallvard Parish for weekly Holy Masses on Sundays at 6PM.

The church room has four pillars and glass roofs. The altar is made of light marble. The altarpiece, which represents the Lion of Judah and the lamb and the stained glass were created by Per Odd Aarrestad. Behind the altar is a glass pillar with a Christ figure. The baptismal font is in glazed brick and marble, designed by the architect 1993. The church organ from organ builder Ryde & Berg has 17 voices.

The church building also contains offices, a parish hall and children's and youth rooms.

The separate bell tower has 12 bells created at the Olsen Nauen Bell Foundry.

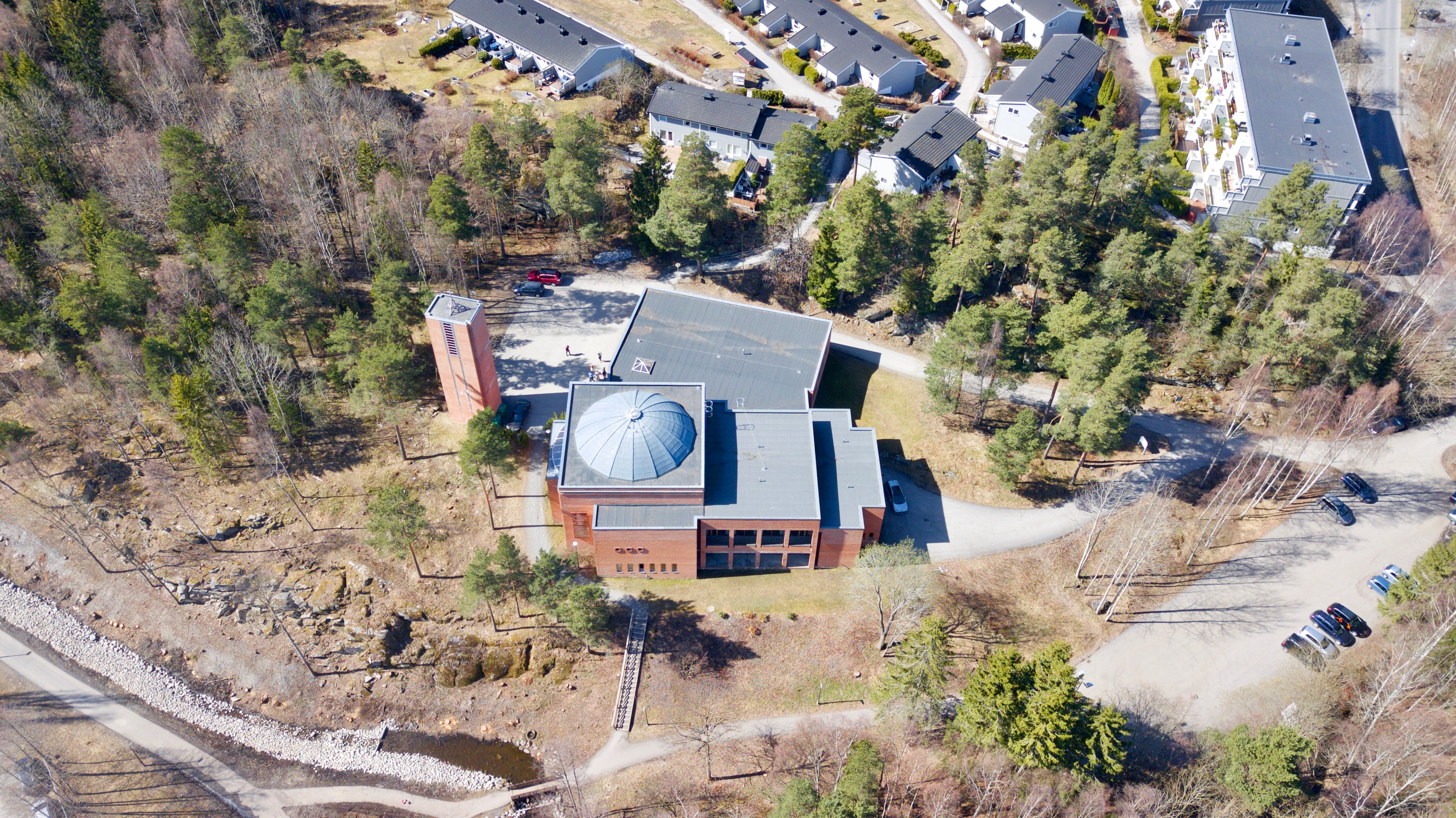
The church in 2018, seen from above
