= Straumsnes, Møre og Romsdal =

Village in Tingvoll Municipality, Norway

Straumsnes Grimstad
- Village
- Interactive map of Straumsnes
- Location within Møre og Romsdal Location within Norway
- Coordinates: 63.0526°N 8.02411°E
- Country: Norway
- Region: Western Norway
- County: Møre og Romsdal
- District: Nordmøre
- Municipality: Tingvoll Municipality
- Elevation: 108 m (354 ft)
- Time zone: UTC+01:00 (CET)
  - Summer (DST): UTC+02:00 (CEST)
- Post Code: 6674 Kvisvik

Straumsnes or Grimstad is a small village area and church site in Tingvoll Municipality in Møre og Romsdal county, Norway. The village was the administrative centre of the old Straumsnes Municipality which existed from 1866 until 1964. Straumsnes Church is located in the village.

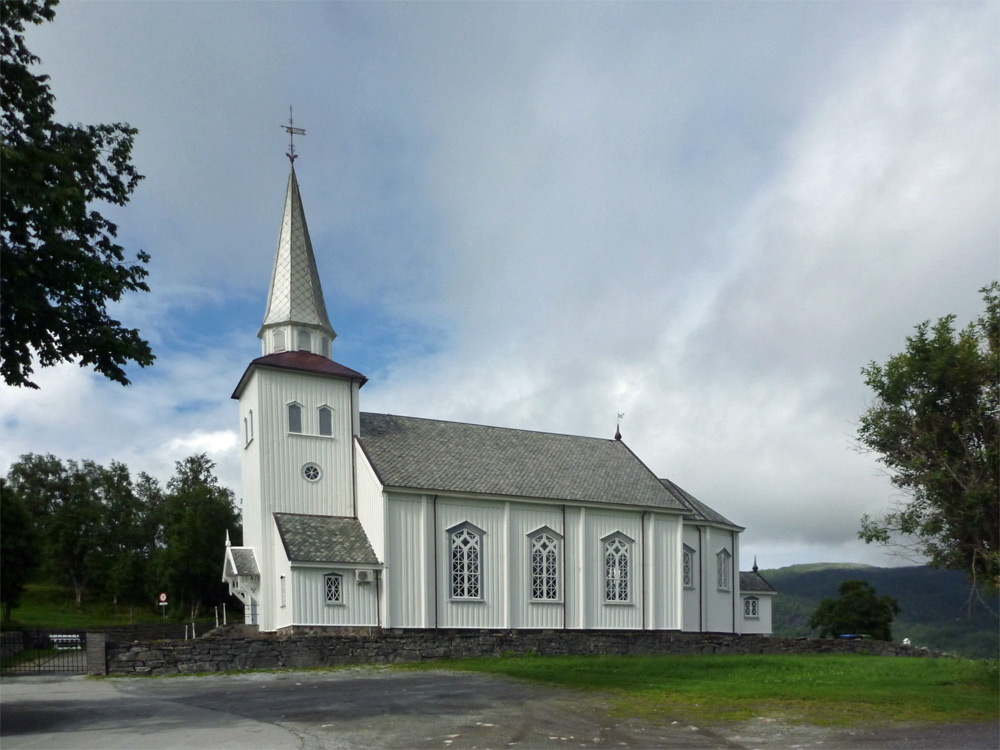
Straumsnes Church

The village lies along County Road 298, about 2 kilometres (1.2 mi) north of the junction with the European route E39 highway. The lake Storvatnet lies just north of the village.
