= Diocese of Møre =

Diocese of the Church of Norway

Diocese of Møre Møre bispedomme
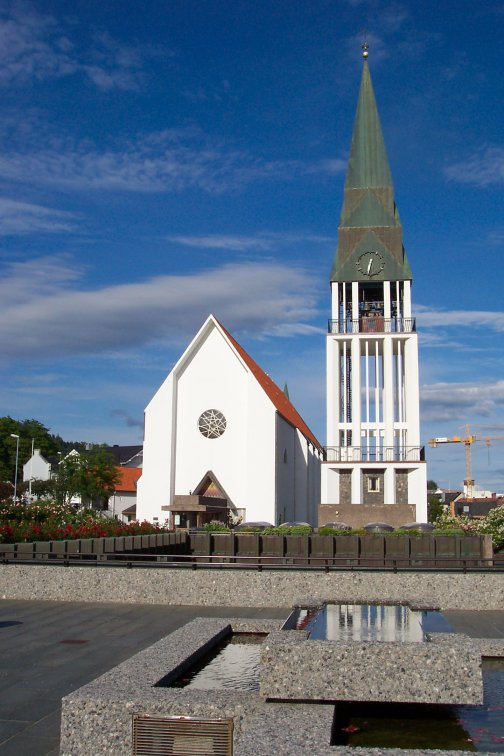
- Molde Cathedral

Location
- Country: Norway
- Territory: Møre og Romsdal
- Deaneries: 7 prosti

Statistics
- Parishes: 41
- Members: 214,116

Information
- Denomination: Church of Norway
- Established: 1983
- Cathedral: Molde Cathedral

Current leadership
- Bishop: Ingeborg Midttømme

Map
- Location of the Diocese of Møre

Website
- kirken.no/more

The Diocese of Møre (Norwegian: Møre bispedømme) is a diocese in the Church of Norway which geographically consists of Møre og Romsdal county, Norway. Its bishop is seated at the Molde Cathedral which is located in the county administrative center of Molde. As of 2008, the Bishop of Møre is Ingeborg Midttømme.

The diocese was established on 18 September 1983, when the district of Sunnmøre was removed from the Diocese of Bjørgvin to the south, and the Romsdal and Nordmøre districts were removed from the Diocese of Nidaros to the north. The three districts (which correspond to Møre og Romsdal county) were used to form the new diocese.

== Structure ==
The Diocese of Møre is divided into six deaneries (Norwegian: prosti). Each one corresponds to several municipalities in the diocese. Each municipality is further divided into one or more parishes which each contain one or more congregations. See each municipality below for lists of churches and parishes within them.

Deanery (Prosti)	Municipalities
Molde domprosti	Aukra, Hustadvika, Molde
Søre Sunnmøre prosti	Hareid, Herøy, Sande, Ulstein, Vanylven, Volda, Ørsta
Nordre Sunnmøre prosti	Fjord, Giske, Haram, Stranda, Sula, Sykkylven, Ålesund
Indre Romsdal prosti	Rauma, Vestnes
Ytre Nordmøre prosti	Aure, Averøy, Kristiansund, Smøla
Indre Nordmøre prosti	Gjemnes, Sunndal, Surnadal, Tingvoll

== Bishops ==
The following people have led the diocese as bishop since the founding of the diocese:

- Since 2008: Ingeborg Midttømme
- 1991–2008: Odd Bondevik
- 1983–1991: Ole Nordhaug

== Name ==
The name of the diocese (Møre) is the result of a compromise between county's three districts. Sunnmøre, with almost half of the population, would accept that the bishop be located in the geographical center of the diocese—Molde in Romsdal—if that region's name (Romsdal) be excluded from the name of the diocese.

The name of the corresponding county was Møre fylke during the period from 1919–1935, and Romsdal amt from 1660–1919. However, the name is old (Old Norse: Mœrr), and it is probably derived from the word marr which means "ocean" or "sea". The meaning is then "coastal district". (A coastal district in Sweden has the same name: Möre.)

The ambiguous designation møring—"person from Møre"—is used strictly about people from Nordmøre (and less frequently for people from Sunnmøre), excluding the people from Romsdal (while, consequently, romsdaling—"person from Romsdal"— is used about the latter).
