= Øre Municipality =

Former municipality in Møre og Romsdal, Norway

Øre Municipality Øre herred
- Former municipality
- Møre og Romsdal within Norway

- Øre within Møre og Romsdal
- Coordinates: 62°55′12″N 07°45′10″E
- Country: Norway
- County: Møre og Romsdal
- District: Nordmøre
- Established: 1 Jan 1838
  - Created as: Formannskapsdistrikt
- Disestablished: 1 Jan 1965
  - Succeeded by: Gjemnes Municipality
- Administrative centre: Øre

Area (upon dissolution)
  - Total: 230.5 km^{2} (89.0 sq mi)
  - Rank: #318 in Norway
- Highest elevation: 1,026.49 m (3,367.7 ft)

Population (1964)
  - Total: 1,596
  - Rank: #444 in Norway
  - Density: 6.9/km^{2} (18/sq mi)
  - Change (10 years): ▼ −6.1%
- Demonym: Ørgjelding

Official language
  - Norwegian form: Neutral
- Time zone: UTC+01:00 (CET)
  - Summer (DST): UTC+02:00 (CEST)
- ISO 3166 code: NO-1558

Øre is a former municipality in Møre og Romsdal county, Norway. The municipality existed from 1838 until its dissolution in 1965 when it was merged into Gjemnes Municipality. The 230.5-square-kilometre (89.0 sq mi) municipality was located south and west of the Batnfjorden, to the northeast of the town of Molde. The administrative centre was the village of Øre.

Prior to its dissolution in 1965, the 230.5-square-kilometre (89.0 sq mi) municipality was the 318th largest by area out of the 525 municipalities in Norway. Øre Municipality was the 444th most populous municipality in Norway with a population of about 1,596. The municipality's population density was 6.9 inhabitants per square kilometre (18/sq mi) and its population had decreased by 6.1% over the previous 10-year period.

== General information ==
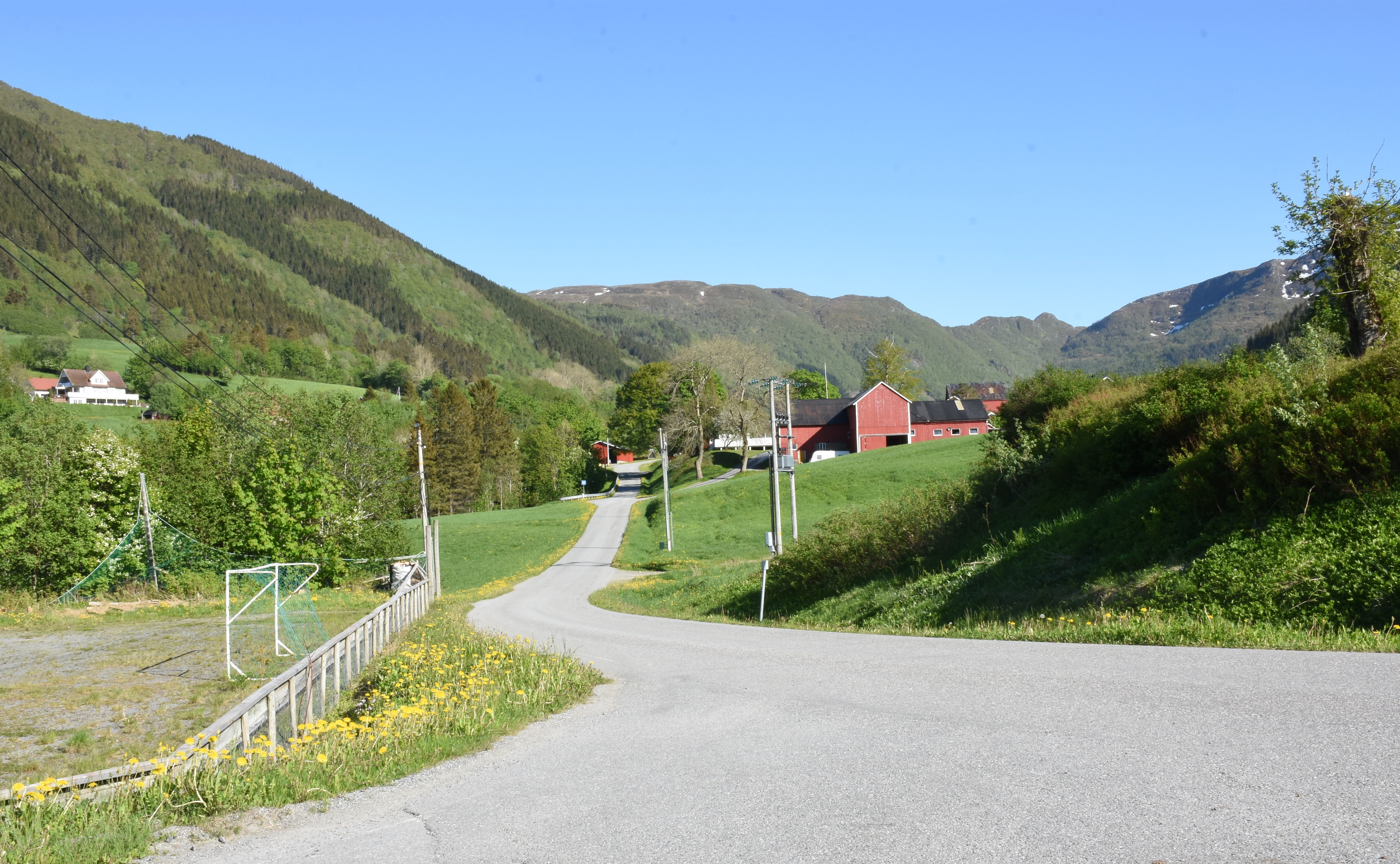
View of the area south of the Øre Church

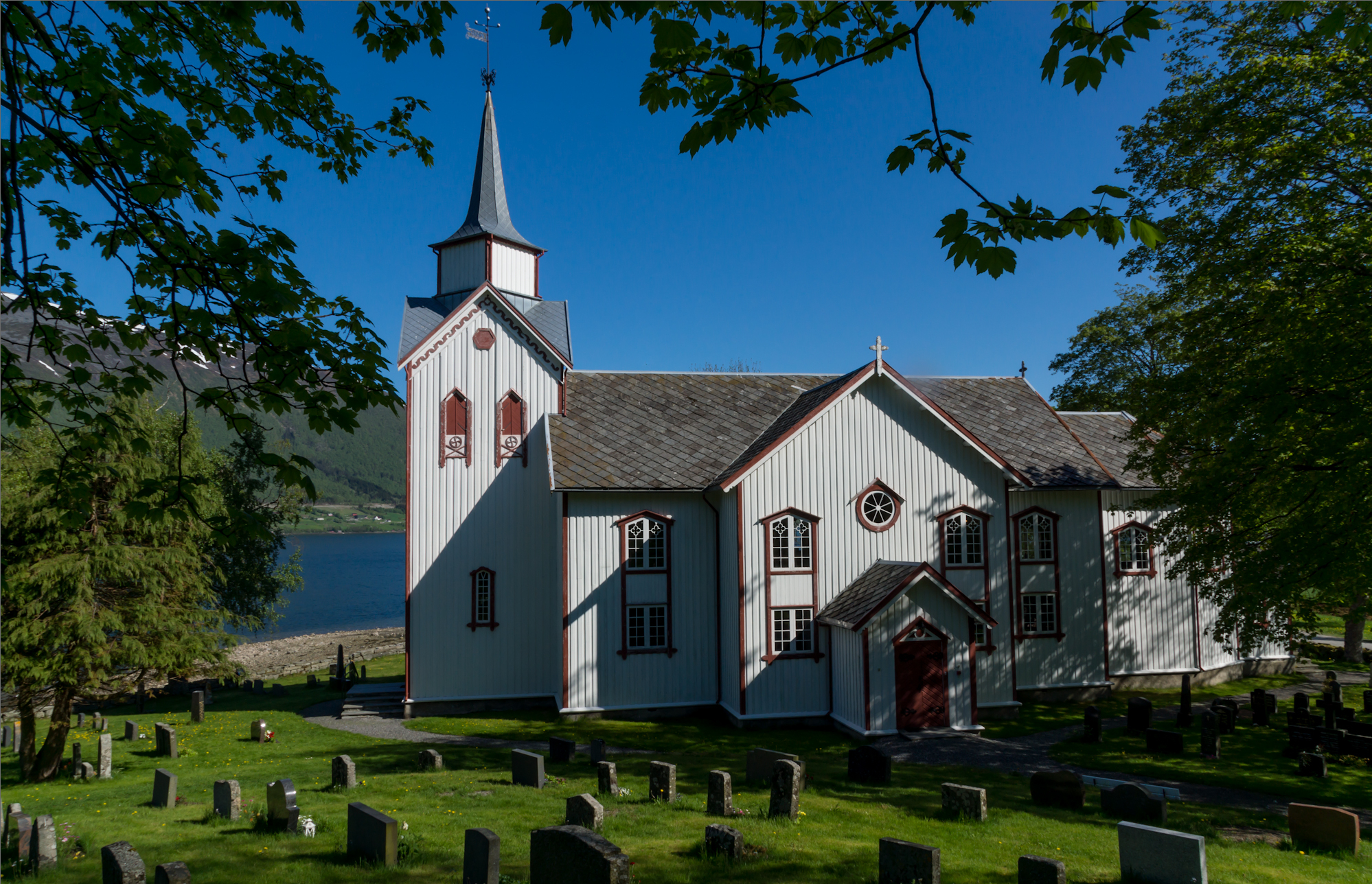
Øre Church

The municipality of Øre was established on 1 January 1838 (see formannskapsdistrikt law). On 1 September 1882, a part of the neighboring Fredø Municipality (population: 40) was transferred to Øre Municipality. On 1 September 1893, the northern part of the municipality (population: 226), was separated from Øre Municipality and merged with parts of Fredø Municipality and Kvernes Municipality to form the newly-created Gjemnes Municipality.

During the 1960s, there were many municipal mergers across Norway due to the work of the Schei Committee. On 1 January 1965, Øre Municipality ceased to exist. Øre Municipality (population: 1,565) was merged with Gjemnes Municipality (population: 697) and the parts of Tingvoll Municipality that were located west of the Tingvollfjorden (population: 778) and together they created a new, larger Gjemnes Municipality.

=== Name ===
The municipality (originally the parish) is named after the old Øre farm (Old Norse: Eyrar) since the first Øre Church was built there. The name is the plural form of eyrr which means "gravel shoal near the mouth of a river".

=== Churches ===
The Church of Norway had one parish (sokn) within Øre Municipality. At the time of the municipal dissolution, it was part of the Øre prestegjeld and the Indre Nordmøre prosti (deanery) in the Diocese of Nidaros.

Churches in Øre Municipality
Parish (sokn)	Church name	Location of the church	Year built
Øre	Øre Church	Øre	1865
Øre	Osmarka Chapel	Heggem	1910

== Geography ==
The municipality lies along the Batnfjorden. The highest point in the municipality was the 1,026.49-metre (3,367.7 ft) tall mountain Snøtinden on the border with Eide Municipality. Øre Municipality was surrounded by Gjemnes Municipality to the north, Eide Municipality to the northwest, Bolsøy Municipality to the southwest, Nesset Municipality to the south, and Tingvoll Municipality to the east.

== Government ==
While it existed, Øre Municipality was responsible for primary education (through 10th grade), outpatient health services, senior citizen services, welfare and other social services, zoning, economic development, and municipal roads and utilities. The municipality was governed by a municipal council of directly elected representatives. The mayor was indirectly elected by a vote of the municipal council. The municipality was under the jurisdiction of the Frostating Court of Appeal.

=== Municipal council ===
The municipal council (Herredsstyre) of Øre Municipality was made up of 19 representatives that were elected to four-year terms. The tables below show the historical composition of the council by political party.

Øre herredsstyre 1963–1964
Party name (in Norwegian)	Number of representatives
Labour Party (Arbeiderpartiet)	6
Christian Democratic Party (Kristelig Folkeparti)	4
Centre Party (Senterpartiet)	9
Total number of members:	19

Øre herredsstyre 1959–1963
Party name (in Norwegian)	Number of representatives
Labour Party (Arbeiderpartiet)	5
Christian Democratic Party (Kristelig Folkeparti)	4
Centre Party (Senterpartiet)	10
Total number of members:	19

Øre herredsstyre 1955–1959
Party name (in Norwegian)	Number of representatives
Labour Party (Arbeiderpartiet)	4
Christian Democratic Party (Kristelig Folkeparti)	5
Farmers' Party (Bondepartiet)	9
Local List(s) (Lokale lister)	1
Total number of members:	19

Øre herredsstyre 1951–1955
Party name (in Norwegian)	Number of representatives
Labour Party (Arbeiderpartiet)	5
Christian Democratic Party (Kristelig Folkeparti)	6
Farmers' Party (Bondepartiet)	6
Local List(s) (Lokale lister)	3
Total number of members:	20

Øre herredsstyre 1947–1951
Party name (in Norwegian)	Number of representatives
Labour Party (Arbeiderpartiet)	5
Joint List(s) of Non-Socialist Parties (Borgerlige Felleslister)	13
Local List(s) (Lokale lister)	2
Total number of members:	20

Øre herredsstyre 1945–1947
Party name (in Norwegian)	Number of representatives
Labour Party (Arbeiderpartiet)	5
Joint List(s) of Non-Socialist Parties (Borgerlige Felleslister)	15
Total number of members:	20

Øre herredsstyre 1937–1941*
Party name (in Norwegian)	Number of representatives
Labour Party (Arbeiderpartiet)	6
Farmers' Party (Bondepartiet)	1
Joint List(s) of Non-Socialist Parties (Borgerlige Felleslister)	2
Local List(s) (Lokale lister)	11
Total number of members:	20
Note: Due to the German occupation of Norway during World War II, no elections were held for new municipal councils until after the war ended in 1945.

=== Mayors ===
The mayor (Norwegian: ordfører) of Øre Municipality was the political leader of the municipality and the chairperson of the municipal council. The following people have held this position:

- 1838–1839: Ole T. Gimnes
- 1840–1843: Knut Jemne
- 1844–1847: Lars Knutset
- 1848–1849: Hans Bersaas
- 1850–1856: Jens Junge
- 1857–1859: Knut Møllerup
- 1860–1863: Nils Sæther
- 1864–1865: John Neergaard
- 1866–1867: Nils Heggum
- 1868–1869: John Neergaard
- 1870–1873: Nils Sæther
- 1874–1879: Amund Ohrseth
- 1880–1881: Nils Heggum
- 1882–1897: Peder Furseth
- 1898–1907: Amund Ohrseth
- 1908–1910: Thore Sildseth
- 1911–1916: Peder Furseth
- 1917–1919: P.A. Sjømæling
- 1920–1923: Erling Øren
- 1923–1925: P.A. Sjømæling
- 1926–1928: Erling Øren
- 1929–1931: Bernhard Grendahl
- 1931–1934: Erling Øren
- 1935–1941: Knut E. Sjømæling
- 1945–1945: Knut E. Sjømæling
- 1945–1946: Sverre Reiten (KrF)
- 1946–1947: Lars E. Bjerkeset
- 1947–1951: Olav Nilssen
- 1951–1955: Sverre Reiten (KrF)
- 1955–1963: Johan Neergård (Bp)
- 1963–1964: Odd Nilsen (Sp)

== See also ==
- List of former municipalities of Norway
