= Øre (disambiguation) =

Øre is the centesimal subdivision of the Norwegian and Danish krones.

Øre may also refer to:

== Places ==
- Øre Municipality, a former municipality in Møre og Romsdal county, Norway
- Øre, Norway, a village located within Gjemnes Municipality in Møre og Romsdal county, Norway
- Øre Church, a church located in Gjemnes Municipality in Møre og Romsdal county, Norway
- Øre (lake), a lake in Åseral Municipality in Agder county, Norway
- Øre, an area Moss Municipality in Østfold county, Norway

== People ==
- Henrik Øre (born 1979), former Danish cricketer

== See also ==
- Ore (disambiguation)
- Öre, the centesimal subdivision of the Swedish krona
