= Gjemnes (village) =

Village in Gjemnes Municipality, Norway

- Village
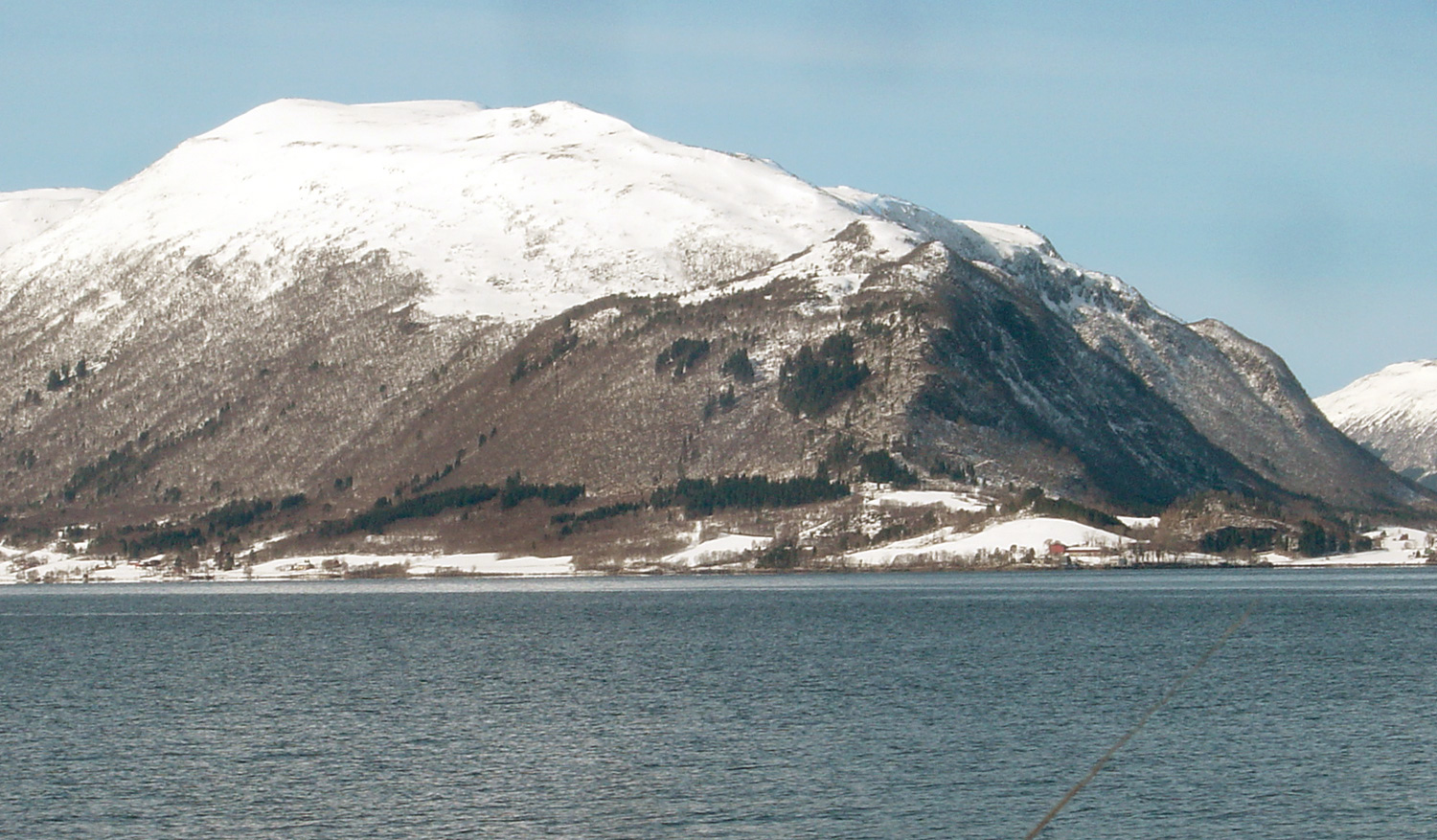
- The village is located along the shore of this peninsula
- Interactive map of Gjemnes
- Location within Møre og Romsdal Location within Norway
- Coordinates: 62.9496°N 7.7659°E
- Country: Norway
- Region: Western Norway
- County: Møre og Romsdal
- District: Nordmøre
- Municipality: Gjemnes Municipality
- Elevation: 5 m (16 ft)
- Time zone: UTC+01:00 (CET)
  - Summer (DST): UTC+02:00 (CEST)
- Post Code: 6633 Gjemnes

Gjemnes is a village in Gjemnes Municipality in Møre og Romsdal county, Norway. The village is located on the southern part of a small peninsula surrounded by the Kvernesfjorden to the north and the Batnfjorden to the south. The village sits along the European route E39 at the western end of the Gjemnessund Bridge (which is part of the network of bridges and tunnels that connect the town of Kristiansund to the mainland. The municipal centre of Batnfjordsøra lies about 8 kilometres (5.0 mi) to the southwest, at the end of the fjord.

Gjemnes Municipality is named after this village because that is where Gjemnes Church is located, and it is the main church for the municipality and parish.

== Media gallery ==
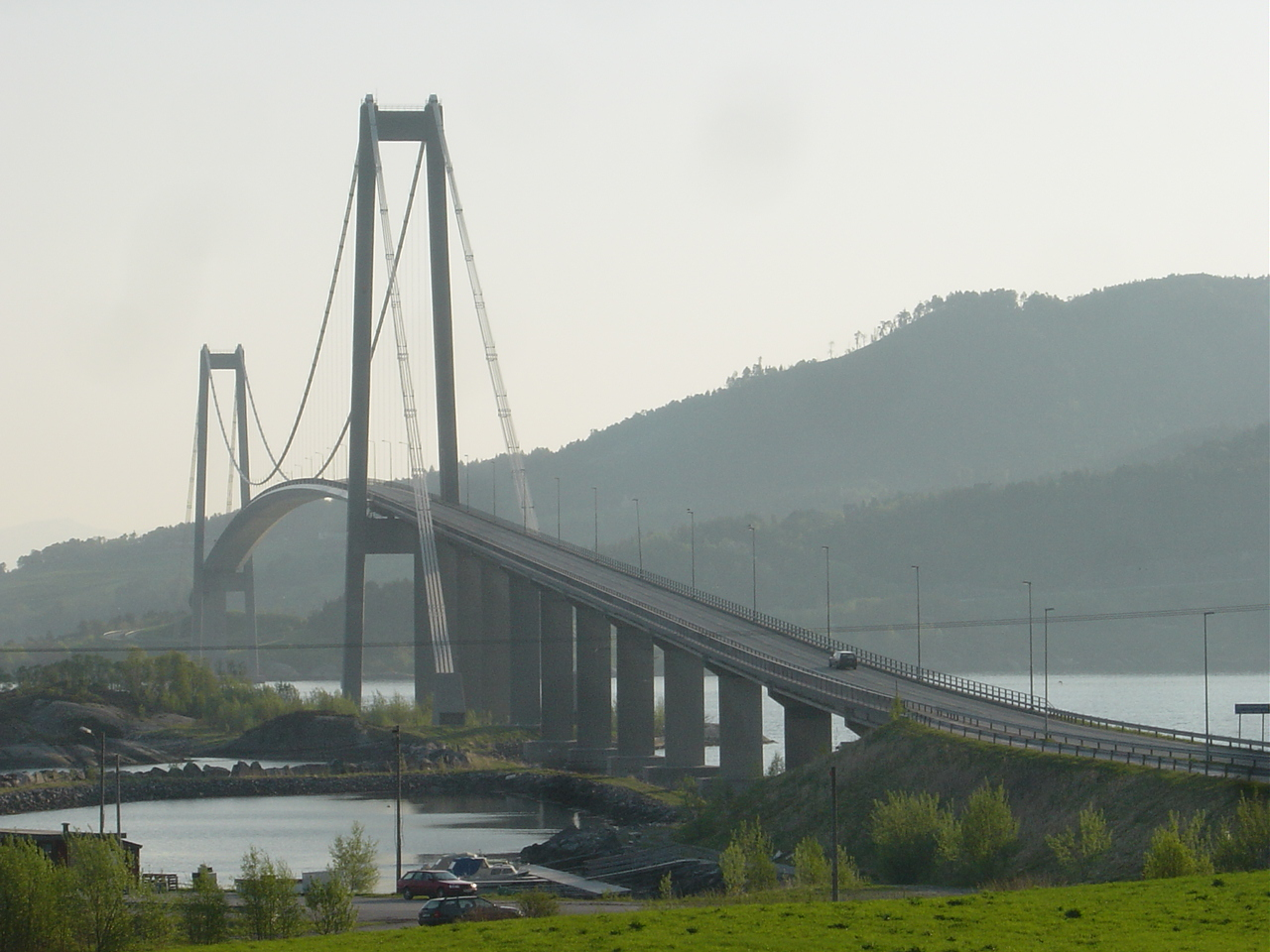
Gjemnessund Bridge

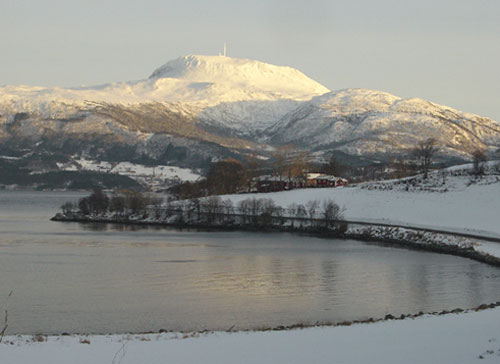
Gjemnes village, looking towards Reinsfjellet

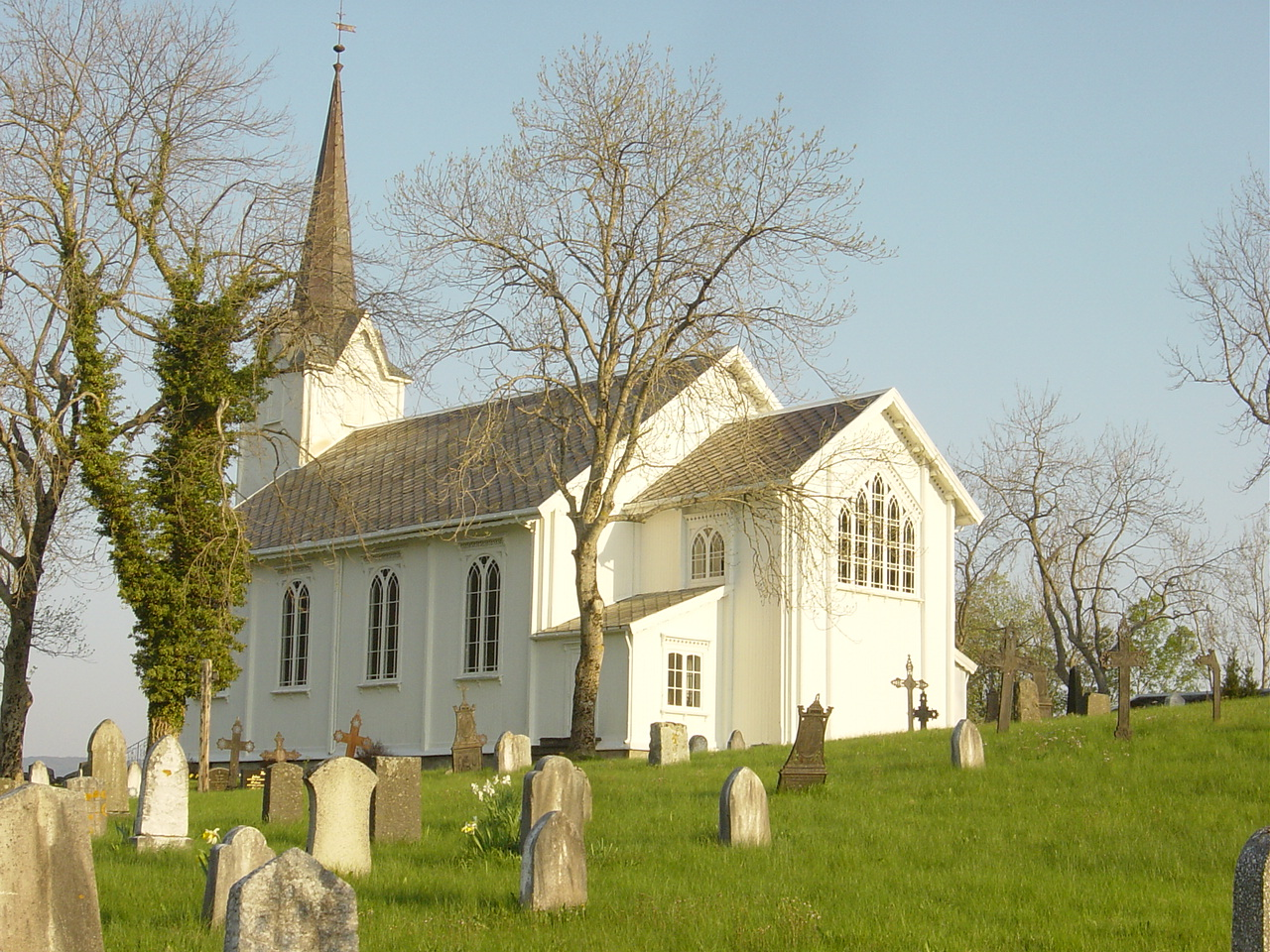
Gjemnes Church
