= Angvika =

Village in Gjemnes Municipality, Norway

Angvika Angvik
- Village
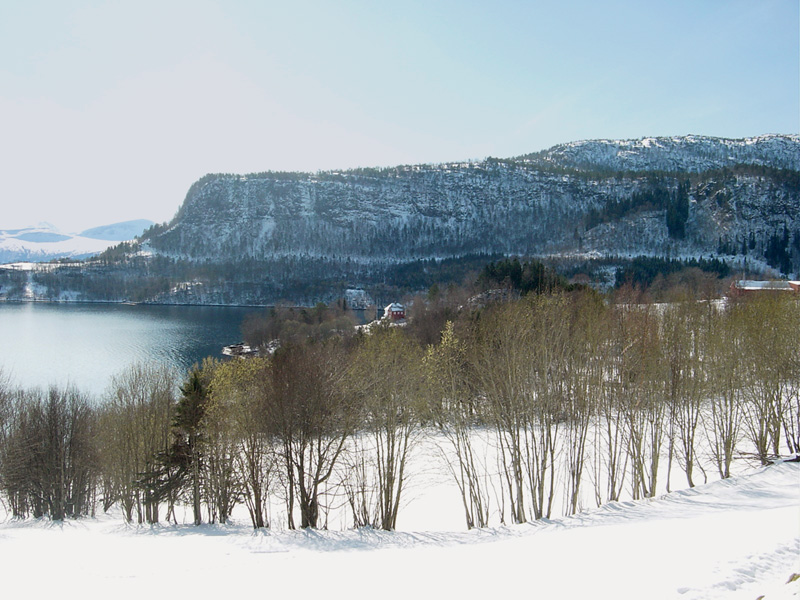
- Interactive map of Angvika
- Location within Møre og Romsdal Location within Norway
- Coordinates: 62.8922°N 8.0860°E
- Country: Norway
- Region: Western Norway
- County: Møre og Romsdal
- District: Nordmøre
- Municipality: Gjemnes Municipality
- Elevation: 17 m (56 ft)
- Time zone: UTC+01:00 (CET)
  - Summer (DST): UTC+02:00 (CEST)
- Post Code: 6636 Angvik

Angvika is a small village in Gjemnes Municipality in Møre og Romsdal county, Norway. The village is located along the western shores of the Tingvollfjorden, just across the fjord from the village of Tingvollvågen.

The population of Angvika is about 300. There is a furniture factory, a salmon fish farm, a Spa Hotel, and tourist apartments. The village of Rausand (in Molde Municipality) lies about 7 kilometres (4.3 mi) to the south, Heggem lies about 10 kilometres (6.2 mi) to the west, Torvikbukt lies about 12 kilometres (7.5 mi) to the northwest–near the mountain Reinsfjellet, and the village of Flemma lies about 6 kilometres (3.7 mi) to the north.
