= Reiten =

Reiten is a Norwegian surname. Notable people with the surname include:

- Agnes Reiten (born 1940), Norwegian politician
- Eivind Reiten (born 1953), Norwegian business executive and politician
- Guro Reiten (born 1994), Norwegian footballer
- Idun Reiten (1942–2025), Norwegian professor of mathematics
- Steinar Reiten (born 1963), Norwegian politician
- Sverre Reiten (1891–1965), Norwegian politician
