= Flemma =

Village in Gjemnes Municipality, Norway

- Village
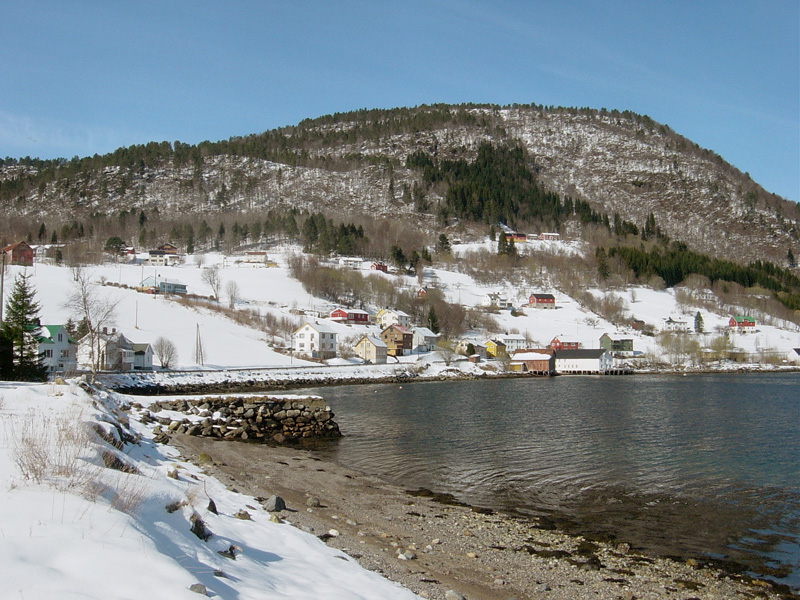
- Interactive map of Flemma
- Location within Møre og Romsdal Location within Norway
- Coordinates: 62.9357°N 8.0752°E
- Country: Norway
- Region: Western Norway
- County: Møre og Romsdal
- District: Nordmøre
- Municipality: Gjemnes Municipality
- Elevation: 2 m (6.6 ft)
- Time zone: UTC+01:00 (CET)
  - Summer (DST): UTC+02:00 (CEST)
- Post Code: 6637 Flemma

Flemma is a village in Gjemnes Municipality in Møre og Romsdal county, Norway. The village lies along the Tingvollfjorden, about 6 kilometres (3.7 mi) north of the village of Angvika. The mountain Reinsfjellet lies about 7 kilometres (4.3 mi) to the west. Across the fjord from Flemma is the village of Gyl in Tingvoll Municipality.
