= Batnfjordsøra =

Village in Gjemnes Municipality, Norway

- Village
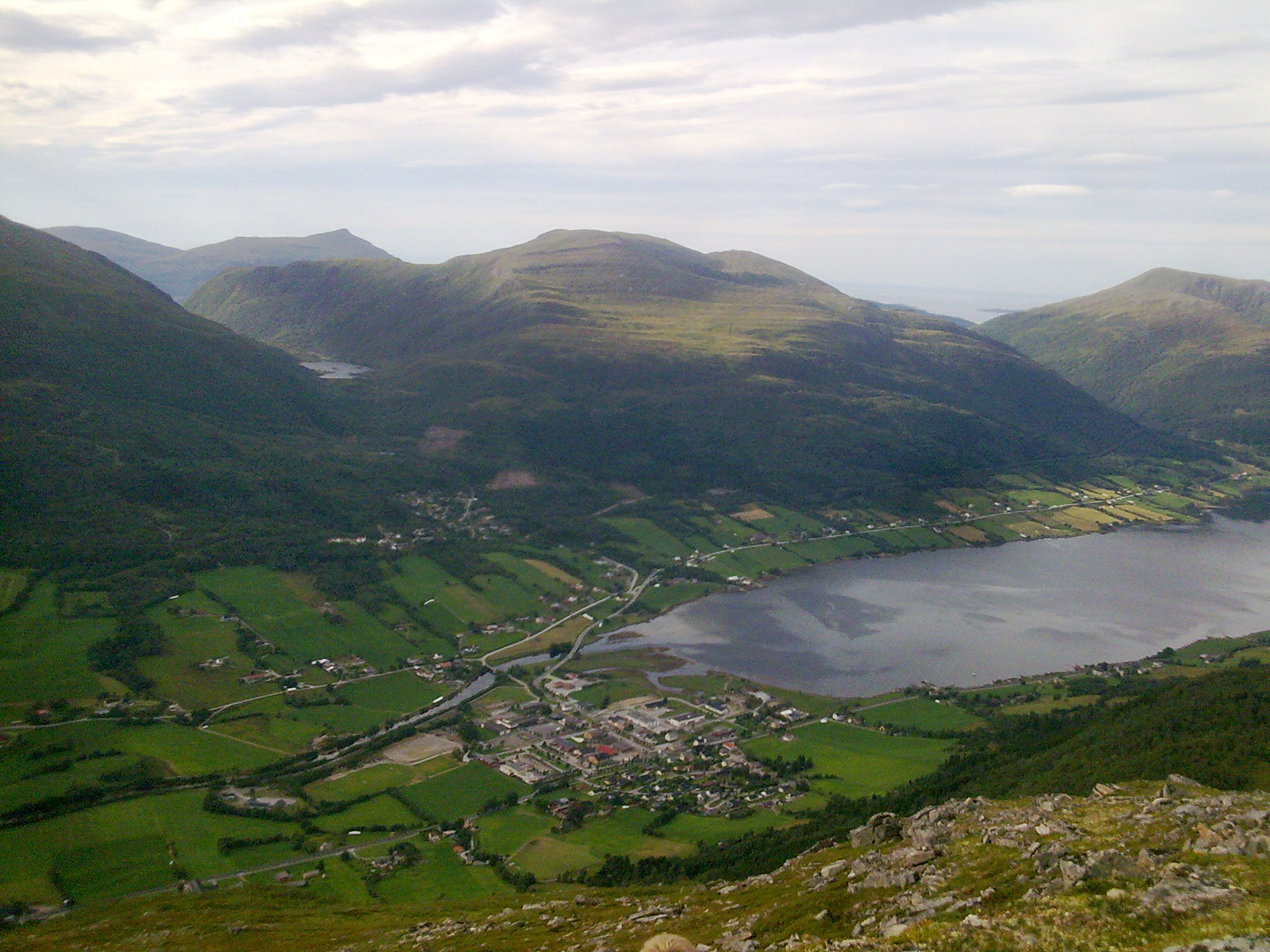
- Batnfjordsøra at the end of the Batnfjorden
- Interactive map of Batnfjordsøra
- Location within Møre og Romsdal Location within Norway
- Coordinates: 62.8946°N 7.6725°E
- Country: Norway
- Region: Western Norway
- County: Møre og Romsdal
- District: Nordmøre
- Municipality: Gjemnes Municipality

Area
  - Total: 0.39 km^{2} (0.15 sq mi)
- Elevation: 11 m (36 ft)

Population (2024)
  - Total: 367
  - Density: 941/km^{2} (2,440/sq mi)
- Time zone: UTC+01:00 (CET)
  - Summer (DST): UTC+02:00 (CEST)
- Post Code: 6631 Batnfjordsøra

Batnfjordsøra is the administrative centre of Gjemnes Municipality in Møre og Romsdal county, Norway. The village is located at the end of the Batnfjorden at the mouth of the river Batnfjordelva. European Route E39 passes through the village on its way from Molde to Trondheim.

The 0.39-square-kilometre (96-acre) village has a population (2024) of 367 and a population density of 941 inhabitants per square kilometre (2,440/sq mi).

The village of Gjemnes lies about 8 kilometres (5.0 mi) to the northeast, along the north side of the fjord, and the village of Torvikbukt lies about 10 kilometres (6.2 mi) to the northeast along the south side of the fjord. The village of Øre lies about halfway between Torvikbukt and Batnfjordsøra. Heading southwest along E39, you will get to the village of Hjelset and the larger town of Molde.
