= Batnfjordelva =

River in More og Romsdal, Norway

Batnfjordelva Storelva
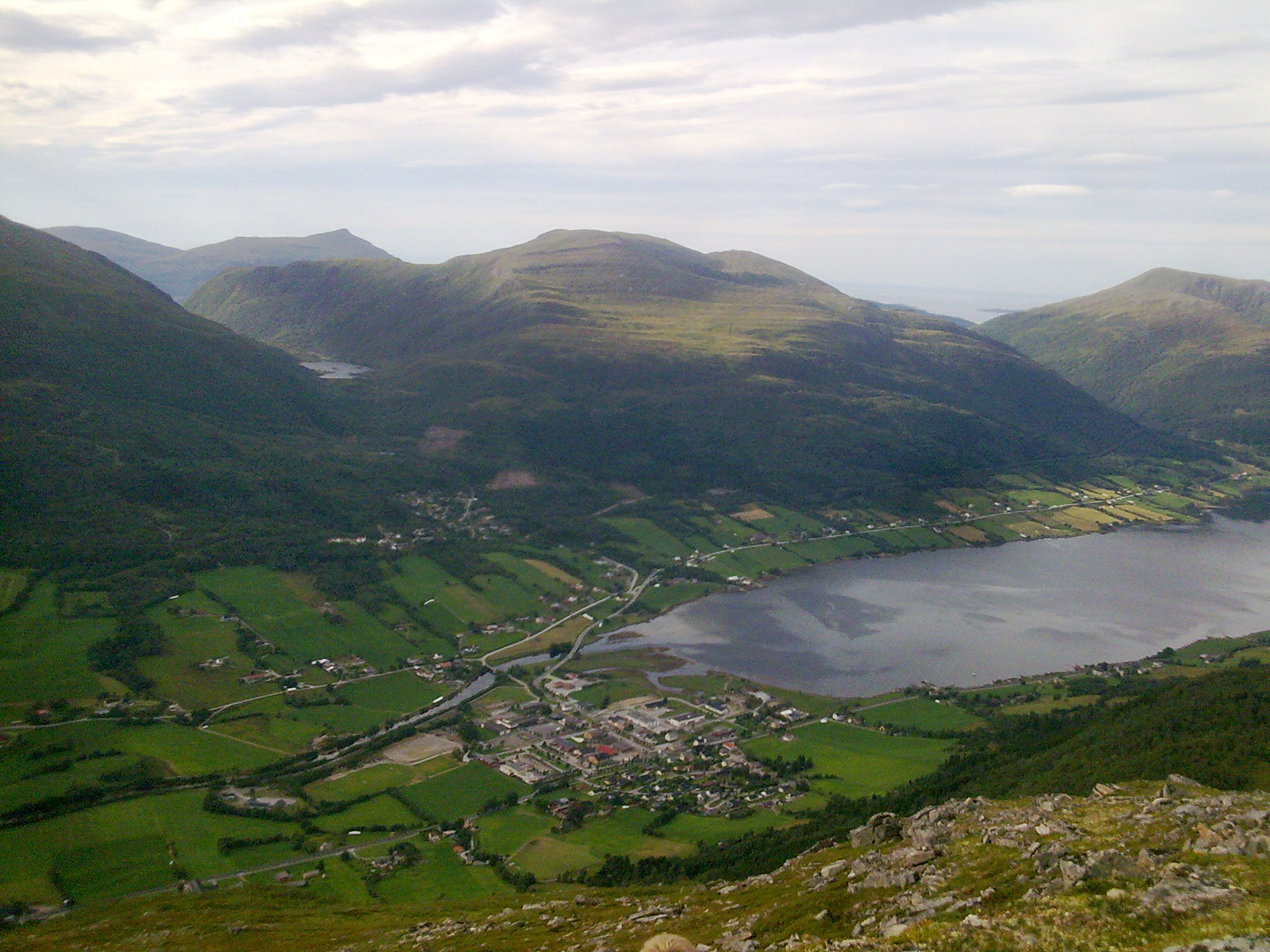
- View of the river mouth, Batnfjorden, and the village of Batnfjordsøra

Location
- Country: Norway
- County: Møre og Romsdal
- Municipalities: Gjemnes Municipality

Physical characteristics
- Source: Lake Botnvatnet
  - location: Langdalen, Gjemnes Municipality
  - coordinates: 62.83491°N 7.445855°E
  - elevation: 260 metres (850 ft)
- Mouth: Batnfjorden
  - location: Batnfjordsøra, Gjemnes Municipality
  - coordinates: 62.89685°N 7.67680°E
  - elevation: 0 metres (0 ft)
- Length: 19.2 km (11.9 mi)
- Basin size: 70 km^{2} (27 sq mi)
- Discharge
  - average: 4.61 m^{3}/s (163 cu ft/s)

Batnfjordelva is a river in Gjemnes Municipality in Møre og Romsdal county, Norway. It originates from the lake Botnvatnet and it flows to the east and later northeast until it empties into the Batnfjorden at the village of Batnfjordsøra. The river is 19.2 kilometres (11.9 mi) long and it has a catchment of 70 square kilometres (27 sq mi). The discharge rate at the mouth of the river is 4.61 cubic metres per second (163 cu ft/s).

The river is popular for fishing Atlantic Salmon, Sea Trout and migratory Char. The parasite Gyrodactylus salaris has been reported in the river, affecting its populations of Atlantic Salmon.

== See also ==
- List of rivers in Norway
