= Haldor Bjerkeseth =

Norwegian politician

Haldor Bjerkeseth (16 December 1883 – 20 August 1974) was a Norwegian politician for the Christian Democratic Party.

He was born in Øre.

He was elected to the Norwegian Parliament from Møre og Romsdal in 1950, but was not re-elected in 1954.

Bjerkeseth was a member of Øre municipality council from 1913 to 1922 and 1934 to 1940.
