= Agnes Reiten =

Norwegian politician (born 1940)

Agnes Reiten, née Lindal (born 30 April 1940) is a Norwegian politician for the Christian Democratic Party.

She was born in Varhaug. After finishing her secondary education in 1959, she took courses related to domestic science. In 1962 she married Tormod Reiten from Torvikbukt. The couple settled there.

Reiten embarked on a political career, as a member of Møre og Romsdal county council from 1975 to 1999, serving the third term from 1983 to 1987 as deputy county mayor. From 1999 to 2003 she was elected to the municipal council of Gjemnes Municipality.

Reiten was elected as a deputy representative to the Parliament of Norway from Møre og Romsdal for the terms 1977–1981 and 1985–1989. She was a regular member from October 1985 to May 1986, while filling the seat of Kjell Magne Bondevik who was a member of Willoch's Second Cabinet. She sat on the Standing Committee on Social Affairs. In total, Reiten met during 283 days of parliamentary session.

From 1982 to 1984 she chaired Møre og Romsdal Christian Democratic Party, and was at the same time a member of its national board. Reiten also sat on case committees within the Norwegian Association of Local and Regional Authorities from 1984 to 1999, and was a deputy board member of that organization from 1991 to 1995. She was a supervisory council member at Kreditkassen from 1980 to 1982, served as deputy chair of the Regional Development Fund from 1989 to 1992 and its successor Norwegian Industrial and Regional Development Fund from 1993 to 1997. She sat on the Norwegian Parliamentary Intelligence Oversight Committee from 1998 to 2006.
