= Heggem =

Village in Gjemnes Municipality, Norway

Heggem Osmarka
- Village
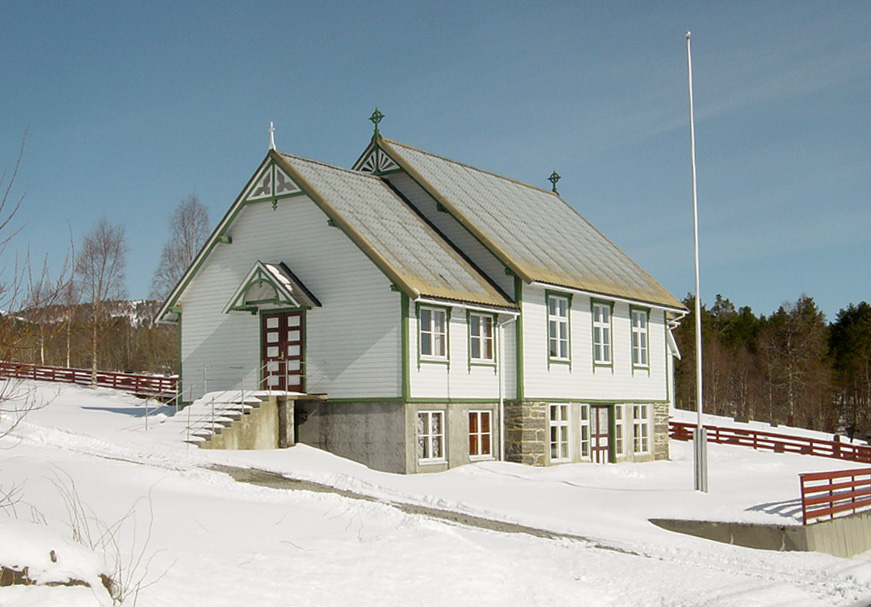
- Osmarka chapel
- Interactive map of Heggem
- Location within Møre og Romsdal Location within Norway
- Coordinates: 62.8707°N 7.8911°E
- Country: Norway
- Region: Western Norway
- County: Møre og Romsdal
- District: Nordmøre
- Municipality: Gjemnes Municipality
- Elevation: 192 m (630 ft)
- Time zone: UTC+01:00 (CET)
  - Summer (DST): UTC+02:00 (CEST)
- Post Code: 6638 Osmarka

Heggem (or Osmarka) is a village in Gjemnes Municipality in Møre og Romsdal county, Norway. The village is located about 8 kilometres (5.0 mi) south of the village of Torvikbukt and about 8 kilometres (5.0 mi) west of the village of Angvika. The Osmarka Chapel is located here. The village has a good view of the mountain Reinsfjellet, located to the northeast.
