= Osmarka Chapel =

- Osmarka kapell
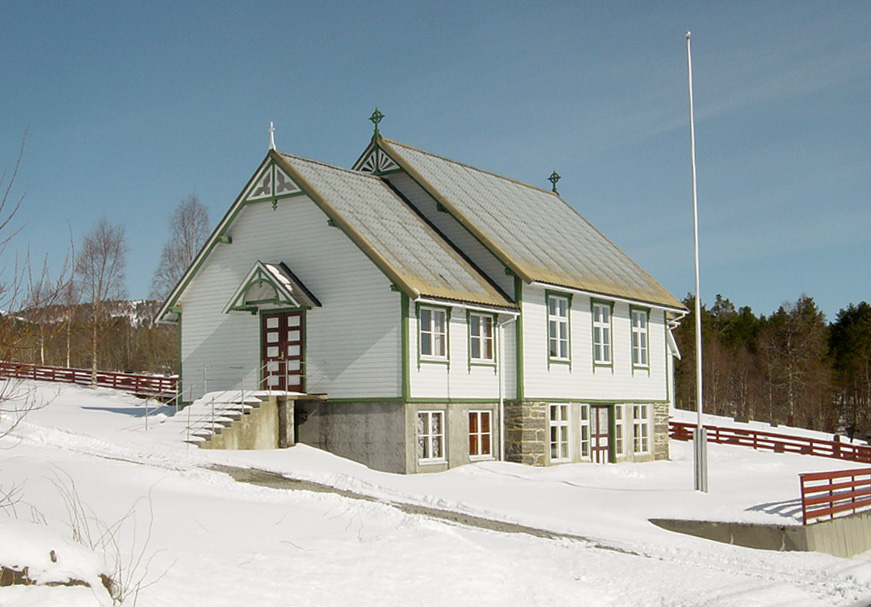
- View of the chapel
- Osmarka Chapel
- 62°51′54″N 7°52′30″E
- Location: Gjemnes Municipality, Møre og Romsdal
- Country: Norway
- Denomination: Church of Norway
- Churchmanship: Evangelical Lutheran

History
- Status: Chapel
- Founded: 1909
- Consecrated: 18 July 1909

Architecture
- Functional status: Active
- Architectural type: Long church
- Completed: 1909 (117 years ago)

Specifications
- Capacity: 110
- Materials: Wood

Administration
- Diocese: Møre bispedømme
- Deanery: Indre Nordmøre prosti
- Parish: Øre
- Norwegian Cultural Heritage Site
- Type: Church
- Status: Not protected
- ID: 227089

Osmarka Chapel (Norwegian: Osmarka kapell) is a chapel of the Church of Norway in Gjemnes Municipality in Møre og Romsdal county, Norway. It is located in the village of Osmarka. It is an annex chapel for the Øre parish which is part of the Indre Nordmøre prosti (deanery) in the Diocese of Møre. The white, wooden church was built in a long church design in 1909. The church seats about 110 people.

== History ==
The Osmarka Inner Mission Association was formed in 1904 to fund and build a chapel in the Osmarka area. On 18 July 1909, their house of prayer was consecrated. The small building was funded and constructed by the local villagers. In 1916, the association was granted permission to build a graveyard next to the prayer house. The parish priest was required to go to the prayer house twice a year to bury the dead and hold funerals. In 1939, the government gave permission for the priest to have four worship services each year at the small prayer house, and later this was raised to six per year. In 1942, the prayer house received an altar and baptismal font. An altarpiece was added in 1943 when the prayer house was upgraded to the status of annex chapel. During the 1960s, the building was renovated extensively. In 1978, the Osmarka Inner Mission Association disbanded and gave the building and graveyard to the municipality to take care of. In 1983, the building was enlarged to add bathroom facilities. From 2002-2005, the exterior of the building was renovated, returning it to its original 1909 appearance.

== See also ==
- List of churches in Møre
