= Øre, Norway =

Village in Gjemnes Municipality, Norway

Øre
- Village
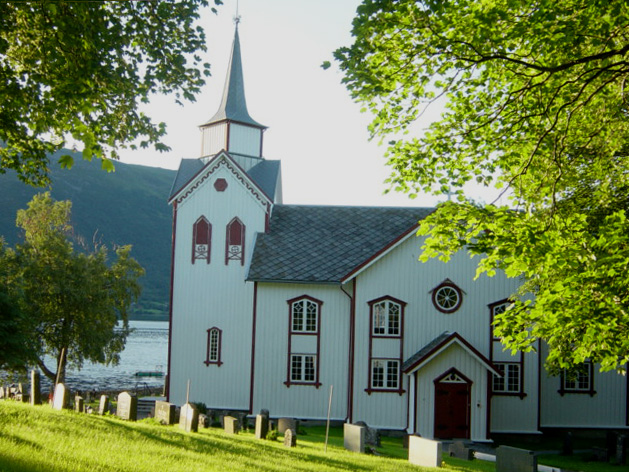
- Øre church
- Interactive map of Øre
- Location within Møre og Romsdal Location within Norway
- Coordinates: 62.9200°N 7.7542°E
- Country: Norway
- Region: Western Norway
- County: Møre og Romsdal
- District: Nordmøre
- Municipality: Gjemnes Municipality
- Elevation: 2 m (6.6 ft)
- Time zone: UTC+01:00 (CET)
  - Summer (DST): UTC+02:00 (CEST)
- Post Code: 6631 Batnfjordsøra

Øre is a small village area in Gjemnes Municipality in Møre og Romsdal county, Norway. The village is located along the Batnfjorden, about half-way between the villages of Batnfjordsøra and Torvikbukt. Øre Church is located in this village.

The village is located along the County Road 666 (Ørvegen road), which runs along the fjord, and the County Road 288 (Skeisdalsvegen road), which runs into the surrounding Skeisdalen valley. The village is wedged in a valley between three mountains (Kammen, Dua, and Blånebba) and the fjord.

The village of Øre was the administrative centre of the old Øre Municipality which existed from 1838 until 1965.
