= Sverre Reiten =

Norwegian politician

Sverre Reiten (14 December 1891 – 12 July 1965) was a Norwegian politician for the Christian Democratic Party. He was born in Grytten Municipality.

He was elected to the Norwegian Parliament from Møre og Romsdal in 1945, but was not re-elected in 1949. Instead he served the terms 1954–1957 and 1958–1961 as a deputy representative.

Reiten was a member of the executive committee of the municipal council of Øre Municipality in 1928–1931 and 1937–1940, later serving as mayor in 1945, 1951–1955 and 1955–1957 and deputy mayor in 1945–1946. He was also the county mayor of Møre og Romsdal in the periods 1951–1955 and 1955–1957.
