= Reinsfjellet =

Mountain in Møre og Romsdal, Norway

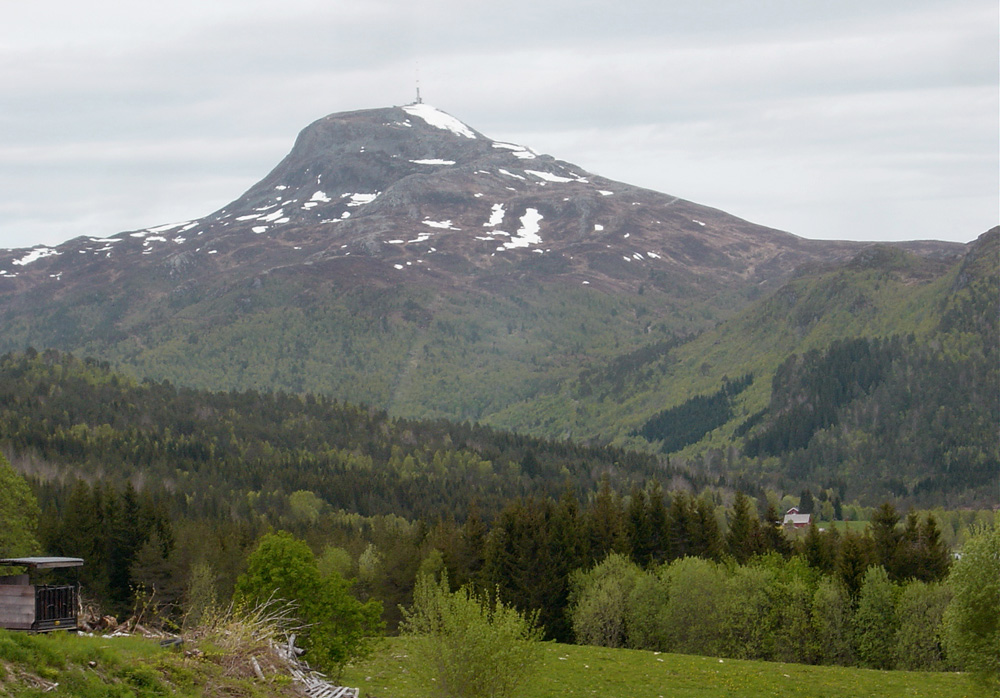
- View from Heggem in Osmarka

Highest point
- Elevation: 994 m (3,261 ft)
- Prominence: 823 m (2,700 ft)
- Coordinates: 62°55′47″N 07°55′35″E

Geography
- Interactive map of the mountain
- Location: Gjemnes Municipality, Møre og Romsdal, Norway

Climbing
- Easiest route: Mountain road to the top

Reinsfjellet is a mountain in Gjemnes Municipality in Møre og Romsdal county, Norway. The 994-metre (3,261 ft) tall mountain is the third tallest mountain in the municipality. It is located on the Romsdal peninsula about 4 kilometres (2.5 mi) southeast of the village of Torvikbukt and the Batnfjorden. The village of Heggem lies 6.5 kilometres (4.0 mi) to the southwest and Angvika lies 10 kilometres (6.2 mi) to the southeast.

There is a road that goes all the way to the top, where there is a communications tower for radio and television.

== See also ==
- List of mountains of Norway by height
