= Gjemnes Municipality =

Municipality in Møre og Romsdal, Norway

Gjemnes Municipality Gjemnes kommune
- Municipality
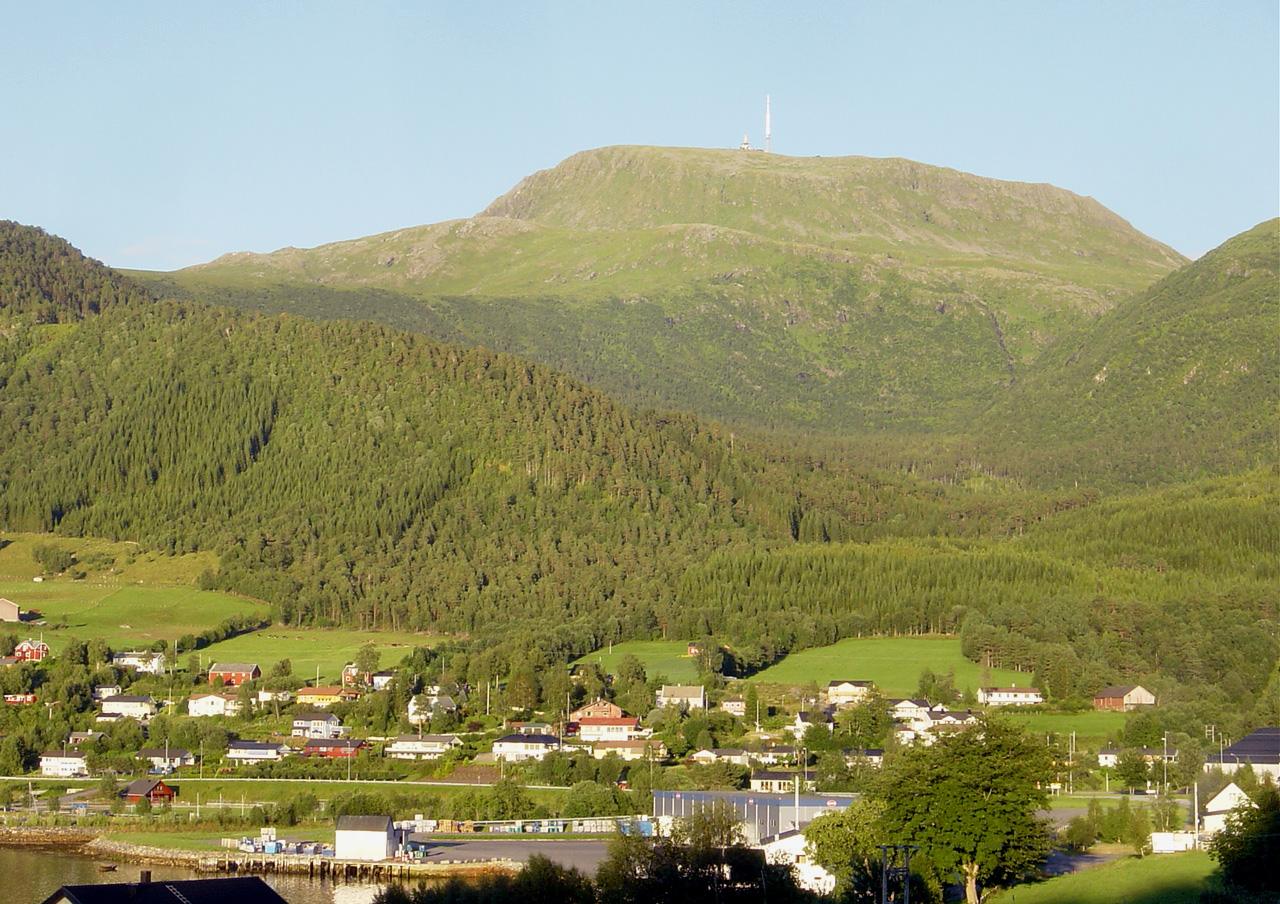
- View of Torvikbukt

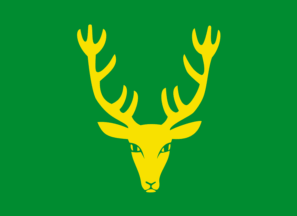
- Flag Coat of arms

- Møre og Romsdal within Norway

- Gjemnes within Møre og Romsdal
- Coordinates: 62°54′59″N 07°55′09″E
- Country: Norway
- County: Møre og Romsdal
- District: Nordmøre
- Established: 1 Jan 1893
  - Preceded by: Kvernes, Frei, and Øre
- Administrative centre: Batnfjordsøra

Government
  - Mayor (2015): Knut Sjømæling (Sp)

Area
  - Total: 381.63 km^{2} (147.35 sq mi)
  - Land: 371.08 km^{2} (143.27 sq mi)
  - Water: 10.55 km^{2} (4.07 sq mi) 2.8%
  - Rank: #242 in Norway
- Highest elevation: 1,026.49 m (3,367.7 ft)

Population (2024)
  - Total: 2,700
  - Rank: #244 in Norway
  - Density: 7.1/km^{2} (18/sq mi)
  - Change (10 years): ▲ +5.3%
- Demonym: Gjemnesing

Official language
  - Norwegian form: Neutral
- Time zone: UTC+01:00 (CET)
  - Summer (DST): UTC+02:00 (CEST)
- ISO 3166 code: NO-1557
- Website: Official website

Gjemnes is a municipality in Møre og Romsdal county, Norway, on the Romsdal peninsula. It is part of the Nordmøre region. The administrative centre is the village of Batnfjordsøra, which lies along the Batnfjorden and it is a former steamship landing place. Other villages in Gjemnes include Torvikbukt, Flemma, Angvika, Gjemnes, Øre, and Osmarka.

The 382-square-kilometre (147 sq mi) municipality is the 242nd largest by area out of the 357 municipalities in Norway. Gjemnes Municipality is the 244th most populous municipality in Norway with a population of 2,700. The municipality's population density is 7.1 inhabitants per square kilometre (18/sq mi) and its population has increased by 5.3% over the previous 10-year period.

== General information ==
The municipality of Gjemnes was established on 1 September 1893 when the following areas were merged to create the new municipality which had an initial population of 934 people:

- the southern part of Kvernes Municipality (population: 477)
- the northern part of Øre Municipality (population: 226)
- the southwestern part of Frei Municipality (population: 231)

During the 1960s, there were many municipal mergers across Norway due to the work of the Schei Committee. On 1 January 1965, Øre Municipality (population: 1,565) and the parts of Tingvoll Municipality located west of the Tingvollfjorden (population: 778) were merged with Gjemnes Municipality (population: 697) to form a new, larger Gjemnes Municipality.

=== Name ===
The municipality (originally the parish) is named after the old Gjemnes farm (Old Norse: Gímnes) since it was the site of Gjemnes Church. The first element is somewhat uncertain. It may come from an old river name (Gíma). The river name may be derived from the word gíma which means "opening" or "mouth". The last element is nes which means "headland".

=== Coat of arms ===
The coat of arms was granted on 4 November 1983. The official blazon is "Vert, a deer head cabossed Or" (Norwegian: I grønt et gull hjortehode, sett forfra). This means the arms have a green field (background) and the charge is the head and antlers of a red deer. The charge has a tincture of Or which means it is commonly colored yellow, but if it is made out of metal, then gold is used. The green color in the field symbolizes the importance of the agricultural history of the community. The deer head was chosen since these deer are quite common in the municipality. The deer antlers have twelve points on them, representing the twelve districts of Gjemnes. The arms were designed by Jarle Skuseth who based it off an original idea by Birger A. Eikrem. The municipal flag has the same design as the coat of arms.

=== Churches ===
The Church of Norway has two parishes (sokn) within Gjemnes Municipality. It is part of the Indre Nordmøre prosti (deanery) in the Diocese of Møre.

Churches in Gjemnes Municipality
Parish (sokn)	Church name	Location of the church	Year built
Gjemnes	Gjemnes Church	Gjemnes	1893
Øre	Øre Church	Øre	1865
Øre	Osmarka Chapel	Heggem	1910

== Geography ==
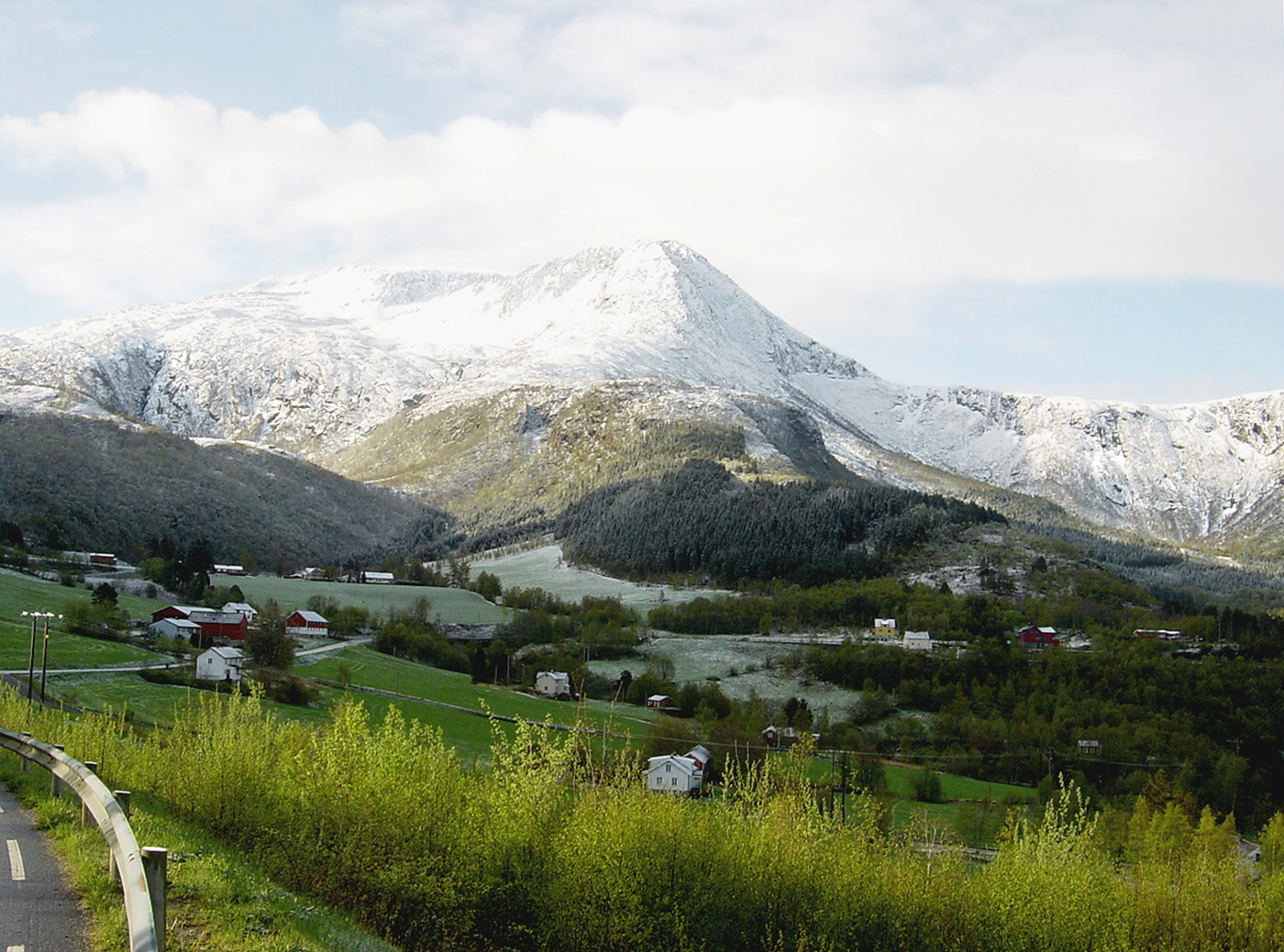
Storlandet and the mountain Harstadfjellet

The municipality lies along the Kvernesfjorden, Batnfjorden, Freifjorden, and Tingvollfjorden. The mountain Reinsfjellet lies near Torvikbukt. The highest point in the municipality is the 1,026.49-metre (3,367.7 ft) tall mountain Snøtinden on the border with Hustadvika Municipality. The municipality also includes the island of Bergsøya which is located at the junction of the fjords near the village of Gjemnes.

Gjemnes is surrounded by Kristiansund Municipality and Averøy Municipality to the north, Hustadvika Municipality to the northwest, Molde Municipality to the south, and Tingvoll Municipality to the east.

== Government ==
Gjemnes Municipality is responsible for primary education (through 10th grade), outpatient health services, senior citizen services, welfare and other social services, zoning, economic development, and municipal roads and utilities. The municipality is governed by a municipal council of directly elected representatives. The mayor is indirectly elected by a vote of the municipal council. The municipality is under the jurisdiction of the Nordmøre og Romsdal District Court and the Frostating Court of Appeal. Waste management is provided by the inter-municipal agency Romsdalshalvøya Interkommunale Renovasjonsselskap.

=== Municipal council ===
The municipal council (Kommunestyre) of Gjemnes Municipality is made up of 17 representatives that are elected to four year terms. The tables below show the current and historical composition of the council by political party.

Gjemnes kommunestyre 2023–2027
Party name (in Norwegian)	Number of representatives
Labour Party (Arbeiderpartiet)	2
Progress Party (Fremskrittspartiet)	3
Conservative Party (Høyre)	3
Christian Democratic Party (Kristelig Folkeparti)	1
Centre Party (Senterpartiet)	6
Socialist Left Party (Sosialistisk Venstreparti)	2
Total number of members:	17

Gjemnes kommunestyre 2019–2023
Party name (in Norwegian)	Number of representatives
Labour Party (Arbeiderpartiet)	3
Progress Party (Fremskrittspartiet)	1
Conservative Party (Høyre)	2
Christian Democratic Party (Kristelig Folkeparti)	1
Centre Party (Senterpartiet)	9
Socialist Left Party (Sosialistisk Venstreparti)	1
Total number of members:	17

Gjemnes kommunestyre 2015–2019
Party name (in Norwegian)	Number of representatives
Labour Party (Arbeiderpartiet)	4
Progress Party (Fremskrittspartiet)	2
Conservative Party (Høyre)	3
Christian Democratic Party (Kristelig Folkeparti)	1
Centre Party (Senterpartiet)	5
Socialist Left Party (Sosialistisk Venstreparti)	1
Liberal Party (Venstre)	1
Total number of members:	17

Gjemnes kommunestyre 2011–2015
Party name (in Norwegian)	Number of representatives
Labour Party (Arbeiderpartiet)	4
Progress Party (Fremskrittspartiet)	2
Conservative Party (Høyre)	3
Christian Democratic Party (Kristelig Folkeparti)	4
Centre Party (Senterpartiet)	3
Liberal Party (Venstre)	1
Total number of members:	17

Gjemnes kommunestyre 2007–2011
Party name (in Norwegian)	Number of representatives
Labour Party (Arbeiderpartiet)	3
Progress Party (Fremskrittspartiet)	2
Conservative Party (Høyre)	2
Christian Democratic Party (Kristelig Folkeparti)	3
Centre Party (Senterpartiet)	6
Socialist Left Party (Sosialistisk Venstreparti)	1
Total number of members:	17

Gjemnes kommunestyre 2003–2007
Party name (in Norwegian)	Number of representatives
Labour Party (Arbeiderpartiet)	3
Conservative Party (Høyre)	3
Christian Democratic Party (Kristelig Folkeparti)	5
Centre Party (Senterpartiet)	5
Socialist Left Party (Sosialistisk Venstreparti)	1
Total number of members:	17

Gjemnes kommunestyre 1999–2003
Party name (in Norwegian)	Number of representatives
Labour Party (Arbeiderpartiet)	4
Conservative Party (Høyre)	1
Christian Democratic Party (Kristelig Folkeparti)	6
Centre Party (Senterpartiet)	5
Socialist Left Party (Sosialistisk Venstreparti)	1
Total number of members:	17

Gjemnes kommunestyre 1995–1999
Party name (in Norwegian)	Number of representatives
Labour Party (Arbeiderpartiet)	6
Conservative Party (Høyre)	1
Christian Democratic Party (Kristelig Folkeparti)	4
Centre Party (Senterpartiet)	9
Socialist Left Party (Sosialistisk Venstreparti)	1
Total number of members:	21

Gjemnes kommunestyre 1991–1995
Party name (in Norwegian)	Number of representatives
Labour Party (Arbeiderpartiet)	5
Conservative Party (Høyre)	2
Christian Democratic Party (Kristelig Folkeparti)	4
Centre Party (Senterpartiet)	8
Socialist Left Party (Sosialistisk Venstreparti)	1
Liberal Party (Venstre)	1
Total number of members:	21

Gjemnes kommunestyre 1987–1991
Party name (in Norwegian)	Number of representatives
Labour Party (Arbeiderpartiet)	7
Conservative Party (Høyre)	2
Christian Democratic Party (Kristelig Folkeparti)	3
Centre Party (Senterpartiet)	7
Liberal Party (Venstre)	2
Total number of members:	21

Gjemnes kommunestyre 1983–1987
Party name (in Norwegian)	Number of representatives
Labour Party (Arbeiderpartiet)	6
Conservative Party (Høyre)	2
Christian Democratic Party (Kristelig Folkeparti)	4
Centre Party (Senterpartiet)	6
Gjemnes common list (Gjemnes samlingsliste)	3
Total number of members:	21

Gjemnes kommunestyre 1979–1983
Party name (in Norwegian)	Number of representatives
Labour Party (Arbeiderpartiet)	5
Conservative Party (Høyre)	2
Christian Democratic Party (Kristelig Folkeparti)	2
Centre Party (Senterpartiet)	5
Gjemnes common list (Gjemnes samlingsliste)	5
Total number of members:	19

Gjemnes kommunestyre 1975–1979
Party name (in Norwegian)	Number of representatives
Labour Party (Arbeiderpartiet)	4
Conservative Party (Høyre)	1
Christian Democratic Party (Kristelig Folkeparti)	2
Centre Party (Senterpartiet)	6
Gjemnes common list (Gjemnes samlingsliste)	6
Total number of members:	19

Gjemnes kommunestyre 1971–1975
Party name (in Norwegian)	Number of representatives
Labour Party (Arbeiderpartiet)	5
Centre Party (Senterpartiet)	3
Joint List(s) of Non-Socialist Parties (Borgerlige Felleslister)	2
Local List(s) (Lokale lister)	9
Total number of members:	19

Gjemnes kommunestyre 1967–1971
Party name (in Norwegian)	Number of representatives
Labour Party (Arbeiderpartiet)	6
Christian Democratic Party (Kristelig Folkeparti)	2
Centre Party (Senterpartiet)	7
Liberal Party (Venstre)	2
Local List(s) (Lokale lister)	8
Total number of members:	25

Gjemnes kommunestyre 1963–1967
Party name (in Norwegian)	Number of representatives
Labour Party (Arbeiderpartiet)	2
Christian Democratic Party (Kristelig Folkeparti)	2
Centre Party (Senterpartiet)	4
Joint List(s) of Non-Socialist Parties (Borgerlige Felleslister)	2
Local List(s) (Lokale lister)	3
Total number of members:	13

Gjemnes herredsstyre 1959–1963
Party name (in Norwegian)	Number of representatives
Labour Party (Arbeiderpartiet)	3
Christian Democratic Party (Kristelig Folkeparti)	2
Centre Party (Senterpartiet)	2
Local List(s) (Lokale lister)	6
Total number of members:	13

Gjemnes herredsstyre 1955–1959
Party name (in Norwegian)	Number of representatives
Labour Party (Arbeiderpartiet)	3
Christian Democratic Party (Kristelig Folkeparti)	2
Farmers' Party (Bondepartiet)	3
Local List(s) (Lokale lister)	5
Total number of members:	13

Gjemnes herredsstyre 1951–1955
Party name (in Norwegian)	Number of representatives
Labour Party (Arbeiderpartiet)	3
Christian Democratic Party (Kristelig Folkeparti)	1
Farmers' Party (Bondepartiet)	3
Local List(s) (Lokale lister)	5
Total number of members:	12

Gjemnes herredsstyre 1947–1951
Party name (in Norwegian)	Number of representatives
Labour Party (Arbeiderpartiet)	3
Farmers' Party (Bondepartiet)	4
Local List(s) (Lokale lister)	5
Total number of members:	12

Gjemnes herredsstyre 1945–1947
Party name (in Norwegian)	Number of representatives
Labour Party (Arbeiderpartiet)	3
Christian Democratic Party (Kristelig Folkeparti)	1
Farmers' Party (Bondepartiet)	3
Local List(s) (Lokale lister)	5
Total number of members:	12

Gjemnes herredsstyre 1937–1941*
Party name (in Norwegian)	Number of representatives
Labour Party (Arbeiderpartiet)	3
Farmers' Party (Bondepartiet)	6
Local List(s) (Lokale lister)	3
Total number of members:	12
Note: Due to the German occupation of Norway during World War II, no elections were held for new municipal councils until after the war ended in 1945.

=== Mayors ===
The mayor (Norwegian: ordfører) of Gjemnes Municipality is the political leader of the municipality and the chairperson of the municipal council. Here is a list of people who have held this position:

- 1893–1899: O. Gimnes
- 1899–1911: Kristoffer Høgset (V)
- 1911–1914: Anneus Lossius
- 1914–1922: Kristoffer Høgset (Bp)
- 1922–1925: Torstein Røvik
- 1926–1941: Ole K. Høgset
- 1945–1945: Rasmus Lossius
- 1945–1951: Nils O. Stokke
- 1951–1959: Johan Berge
- 1959–1963: Knut Kr. Høgseth
- 1963–1964: Gunnar Stokke
- 1964–1971: Odd Nilssen (Sp)
- 1971–1991: Ole Øverland (Sp)
- 1999–2007: Odd Steinar Bjerkeset (KrF)
- 2007–2011: Knut Sjømæling (Sp)
- 2011–2015: Odd Steinar Bjerkeset (KrF)
- 2015–present: Knut Sjømæling (Sp)

== Transport ==
European Route E39 runs through the municipality and over the Gjemnessund Bridge and Bergsøysund Bridge connecting Gjemnes to Tingvoll Municipality. The Freifjord Tunnel (part of Norwegian National Road 70) runs from Bergsøya to the nearby island of Frei (and ultimately Kristiansund).

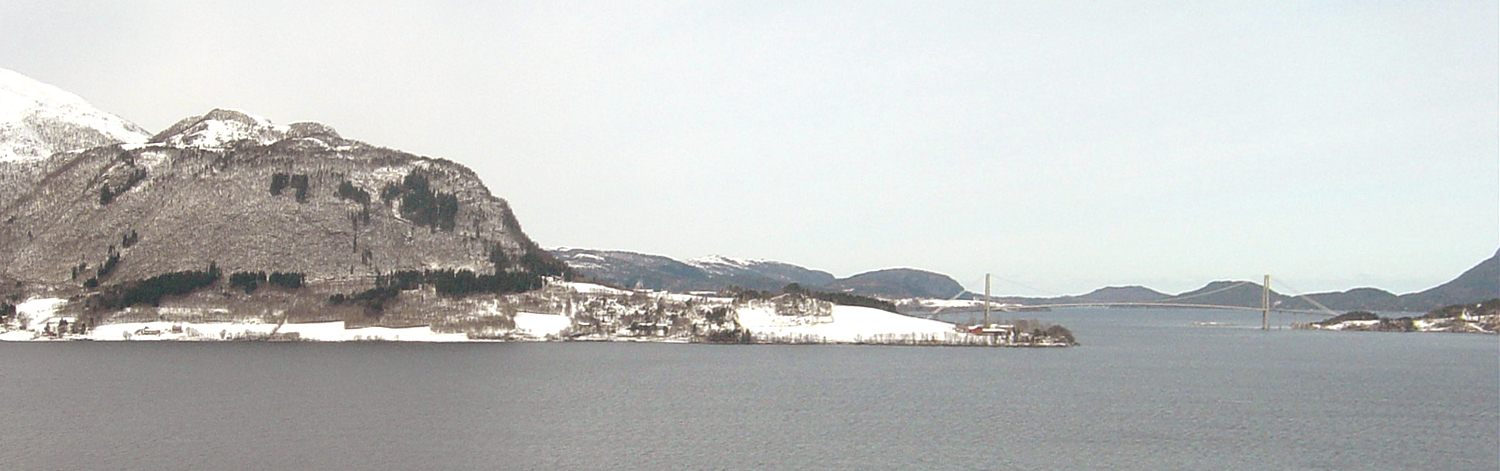
Gjemnes and the Gjemnessundbrua

== Notable people ==
- Anton Berge (1892–1951) – a Norwegian agronomist and local politician
- Heine Gikling Bruseth (b. 2004) – professional footballer
- John Neergaard (1795–1885) – a Norwegian farmer and bailiff (lensmann) in Gjemnes 1836 to 1854
