= Øre Church =

- Øre kyrkje
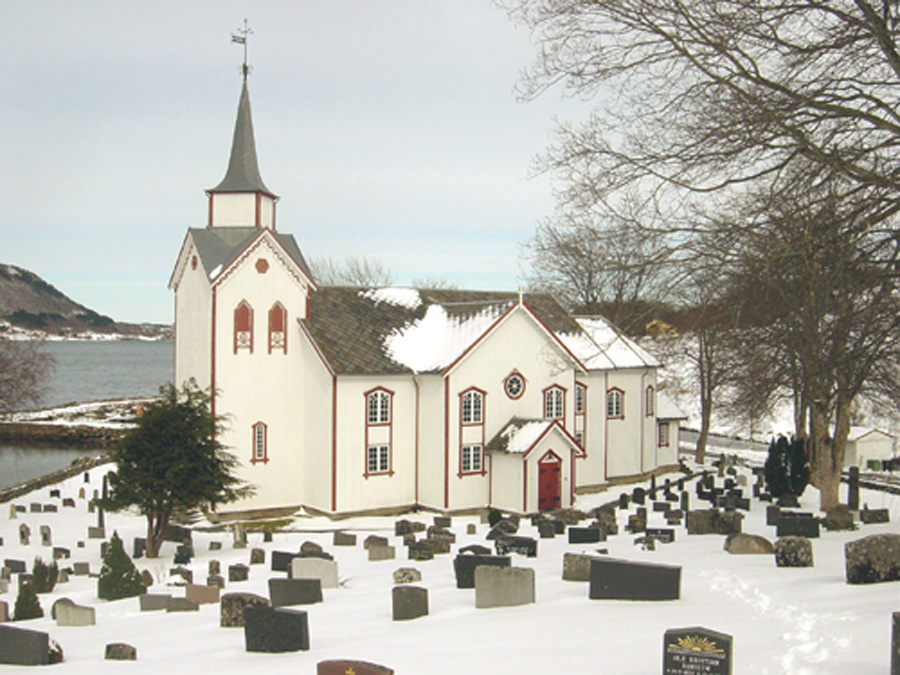
- View of the church
- Øre Church
- 62°55′12″N 7°45′12″E
- Location: Gjemnes Municipality, Møre og Romsdal
- Country: Norway
- Denomination: Church of Norway
- Churchmanship: Evangelical Lutheran

History
- Status: Parish church
- Founded: 13th century
- Consecrated: 1865

Architecture
- Functional status: Active
- Architect: Gustav Olsen
- Architectural type: Cruciform
- Completed: 1865 (161 years ago)

Specifications
- Capacity: 330
- Materials: Wood

Administration
- Diocese: Møre bispedømme
- Deanery: Indre Nordmøre prosti
- Parish: Øre
- Norwegian Cultural Heritage Site
- Type: Church
- Status: Listed
- ID: 85905

Øre Church (Norwegian: Øre kyrkje) is a parish church of the Church of Norway in Gjemnes Municipality in Møre og Romsdal county, Norway. It is located in the village of Øre. It is the church for the Øre parish which is part of the Indre Nordmøre prosti (deanery) in the Diocese of Møre. The white, wooden church was built in a cruciform design in 1865 by the architect Gustav Olsen from Trondheim. The church seats about 330 people.

== History ==
The earliest existing historical records of the church date back to 1303, but it was in existence before that time. The first church in Øre was a long-style stave church that was likely built during the 13th century. Around 1650, a steeple was built on the roof of the nave and a church porch was built on the west end. In 1668, a sacristy was built. In 1669, a timber-framed transept was built to the north of the nave. In 1863, the old church was torn down. A new church was then built on the same site in 1864–1865 to replace it. The new building was designed by Gustav Olsen and it was consecrated in 1865. The church was an annex chapel to the Tingvoll Church parish for centuries, until 1893 when Øre became its own prestegjeld (parish) based at this church.

== Media gallery ==
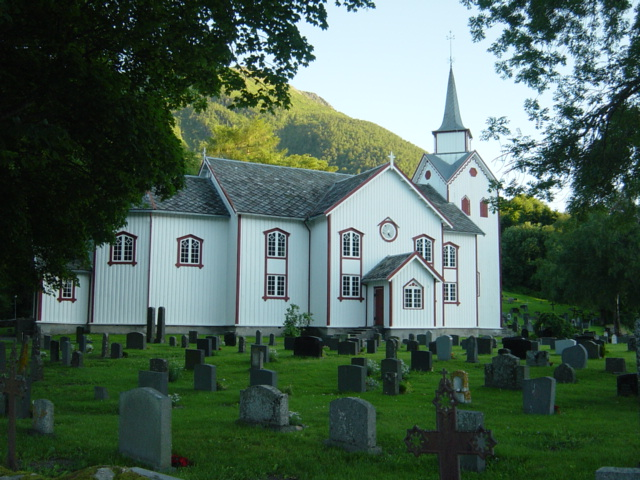

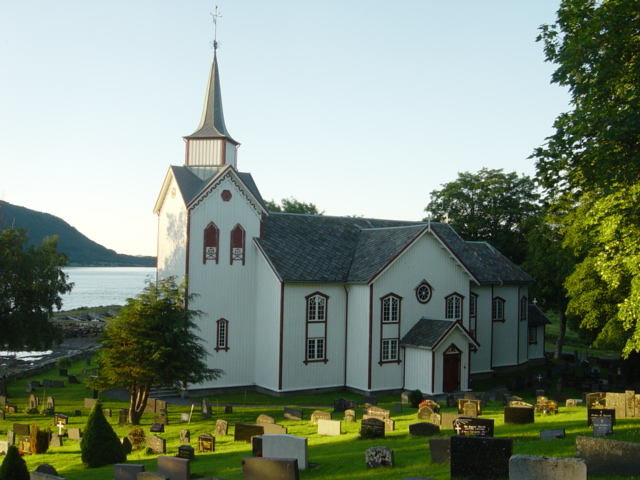

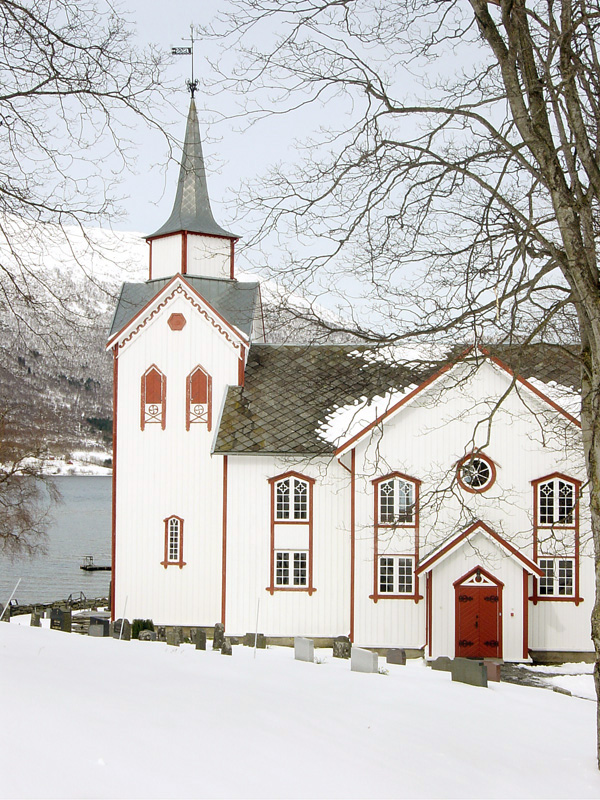

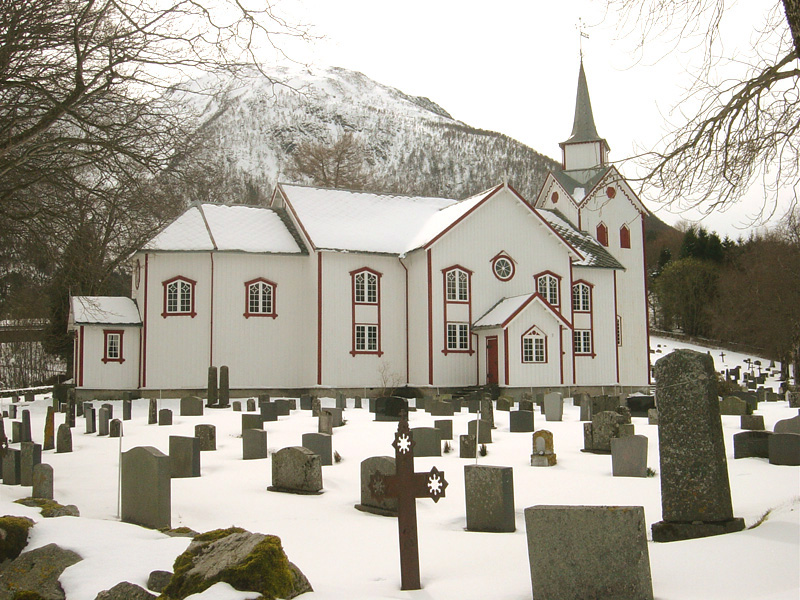

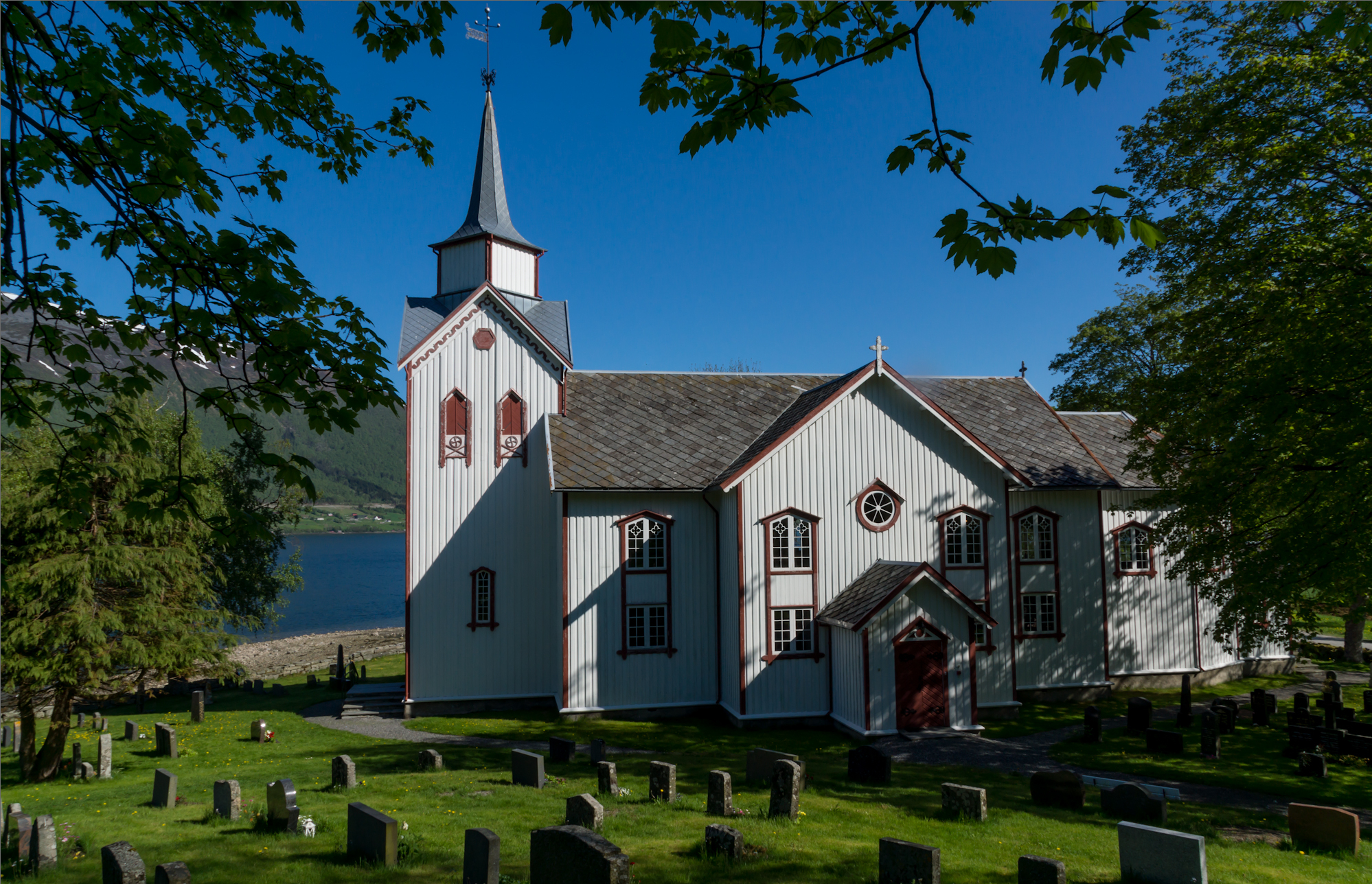

== See also ==
- List of churches in Møre
