= Torvikbukt =

Village in Gjemnes Municipality, Norway

Torvikbukt Torvika
- Village
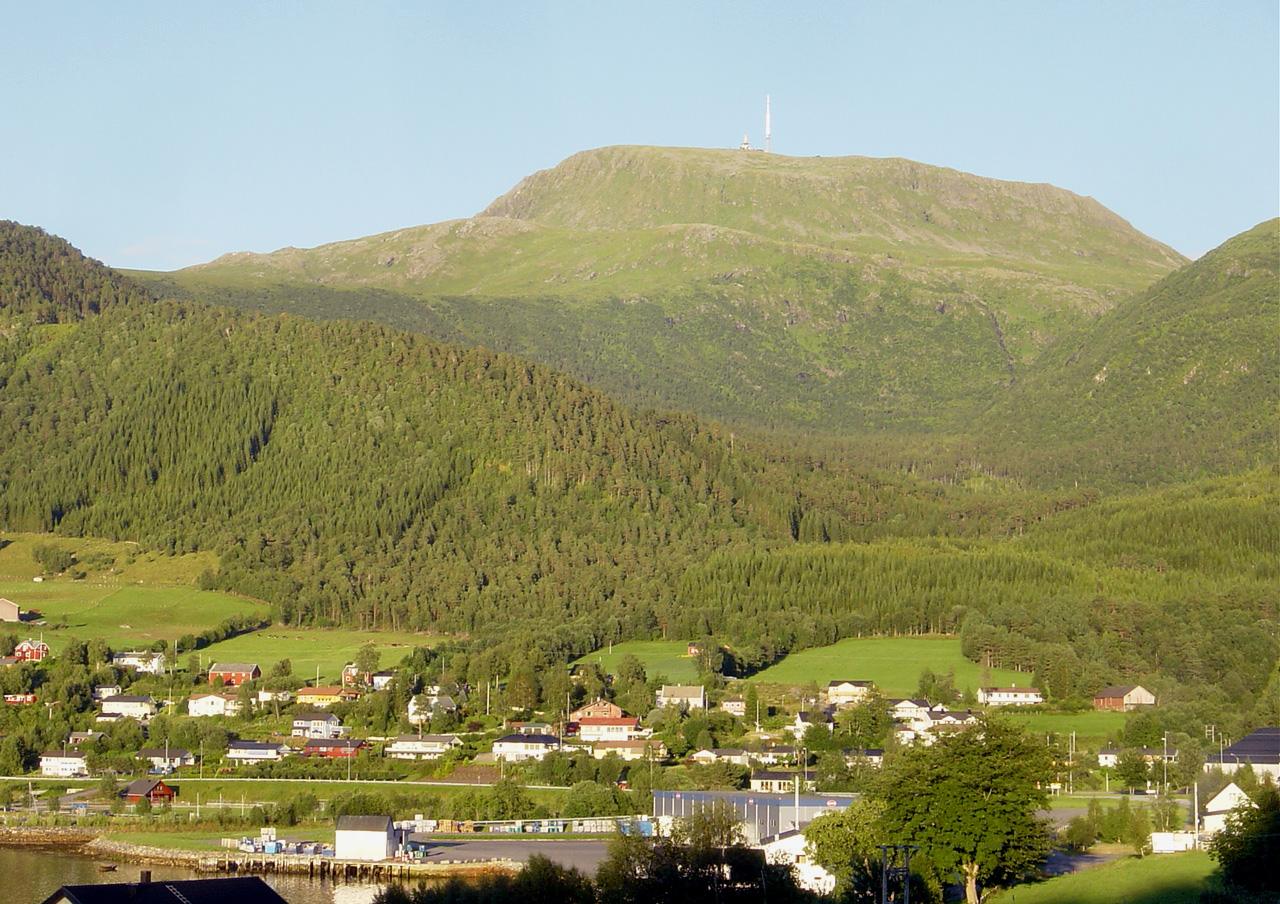
- View of Torvikbukt
- Interactive map of Torvikbukt
- Location within Møre og Romsdal Location within Norway
- Coordinates: 62.9436°N 7.8574°E
- Country: Norway
- Region: Western Norway
- County: Møre og Romsdal
- District: Nordmøre
- Municipality: Gjemnes Municipality

Area
  - Total: 0.38 km^{2} (0.15 sq mi)
- Elevation: 11 m (36 ft)

Population (2024)
  - Total: 269
  - Density: 708/km^{2} (1,830/sq mi)
- Time zone: UTC+01:00 (CET)
  - Summer (DST): UTC+02:00 (CEST)
- Post Code: 6639 Torvikbukt

Torvikbukt is a village in Gjemnes Municipality in Møre og Romsdal county, Norway. The village is located at the junction of the Batnfjorden and Tingvollfjorden and just northwest of the 994-metre (3,261 ft) tall mountain Reinsfjellet. The village of Øre lies about 6 kilometres (3.7 mi) to the southwest and the village of Heggem lies about 9 kilometres (5.6 mi) to the south.

The 0.38-square-kilometre (94-acre) village has a population (2024) of 269 and a population density of 708 inhabitants per square kilometre (1,830/sq mi).

== Economy ==
=== Industry ===
The biggest and most important company is Gjøco A/S. Gjøco is a paint producer, and has the second largest market share in the Norway for indoor-painting products. Gjøco's total sales were approximately 150 million kr (about $25 million) in 2004.

Agriculture is also an important industry for the area. Torvikbukt has several small- and medium-sized farms, which makes a big impact on the village's surroundings and way of living. More recently, many farms have been abandoned, mainly because of the lack of relatives that will continue the production after the retirement of the farmers. Agriculture in Western Norway can be very inefficient because of the alpine landscape, and it makes the business less profitable.

=== Tourism ===
Torvikbukt's typical Norwegian surroundings of fjords and mountains make it an excellent starting point for mountain hiking, fishing, and boat-safari. This attracts both domestic and foreign tourists, which has led to the development of many vacation homes near fjord.Reinsfjellet is a mountain with a very good view and is frequently hiked by tourists.

== Education ==
Torvikbukt has its own elementary school which includes students in first through seventh grades. It is a private school called Torvikbukt Skule. The school has approximately 30 pupils. The school was founded in 2009 as an alternative, after the public school Torvik Skole was closed down because of a lack of funds in the budget of the Gjemnes Municipality. The pupils can alternatively learn at Batnfjord Skule which is the closest public school.

Nordvestlandet folk high school, one of Norway's 83 folk high schools, was established in Torvikbukt in 1917, and it is still operating there.
