= Batnfjorden =

Fjord in Møre og Romsdal, Norway

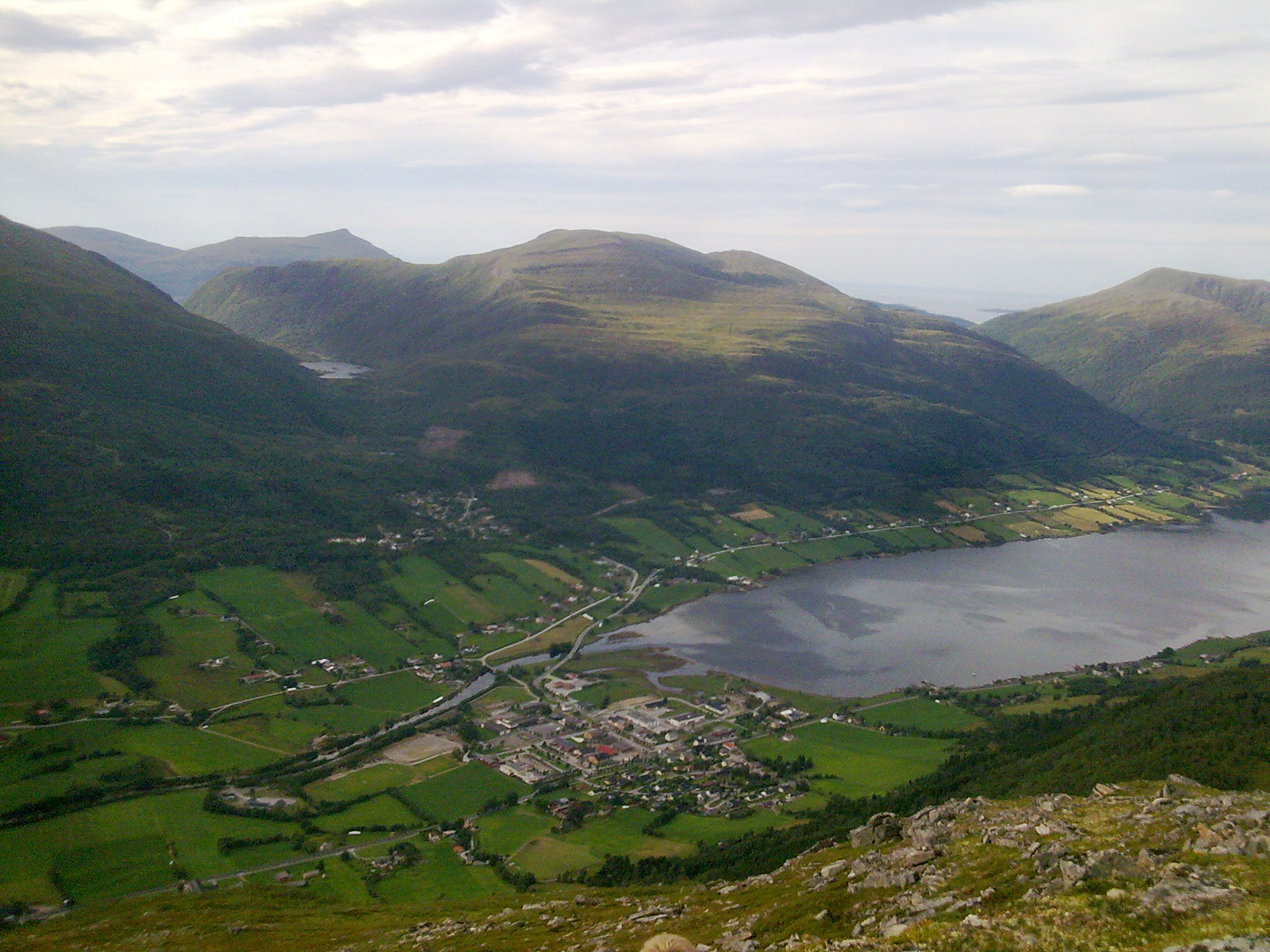
- View of the fjord
- Interactive map of the fjord
- Location: Møre og Romsdal county, Norway
- Coordinates: 62.9064°N 7.7016°E
- Type: Fjord
- Basin countries: Norway
- Max. length: 10 kilometres (6.2 mi)

Batnfjorden is a fjord in Gjemnes Municipality in Møre og Romsdal county, Norway. The 10-kilometre (6.2 mi) long fjord begins at the village of Batnfjordsøra, the municipal center of Gjemnes Municipality, and runs to the northeast toward the island of Bergsøya, where it joins the Tingvollfjorden. Other villages on the shores of the fjord include Gjemnes, Torvikbukt, and Øre. The European route E39 highway runs along the northern shore of the fjord. The river Batnfjordelva flows into this fjord.

== See also ==
- List of Norwegian fjords
