= Nordmøre =

Traditional district of Norway

Coordinates: 62.9188°N 7.9259°E

Nordmøre highlighted in red

Nordmøre (lit. 'North-Møre') is a traditional district in the Norwegian county of Møre og Romsdal. The 5,426-square-kilometre (2,095 sq mi) area comprises the northern third of the county including the municipalities of Kristiansund, Averøy, Tingvoll, Surnadal, Aure, Hustadvika (eastern part), Sunndal, Gjemnes, and Smøla. The only town in Nordmøre is Kristiansund.

Of these municipalities, three are located (mainly) on islands: Kristiansund, Averøy, and Smøla and the rest lie on the coast (including between, adjacent to, or at the end of, fjords): Tingvoll, Surnadal, Aure, Hustadvika, Sunndal, and Gjemnes; no municipalities are completely landlocked. Historically, Rindal Municipality was part of the county and region, but it was transferred to Trøndelag county on 1 January 2019 and Halsa Municipality was part of Nordmøre until 1 January 2020 when it became part of Heim Municipality in Trøndelag.

In the early Viking Age, before Harald Fairhair, Nordmøre was a petty kingdom whose ruler was known as the Mørejarl (literally: "Møre-Earl"). Then, Nordmøre also included the municipalities north and west of Orkland Municipality in Trøndelag.

== Gallery ==
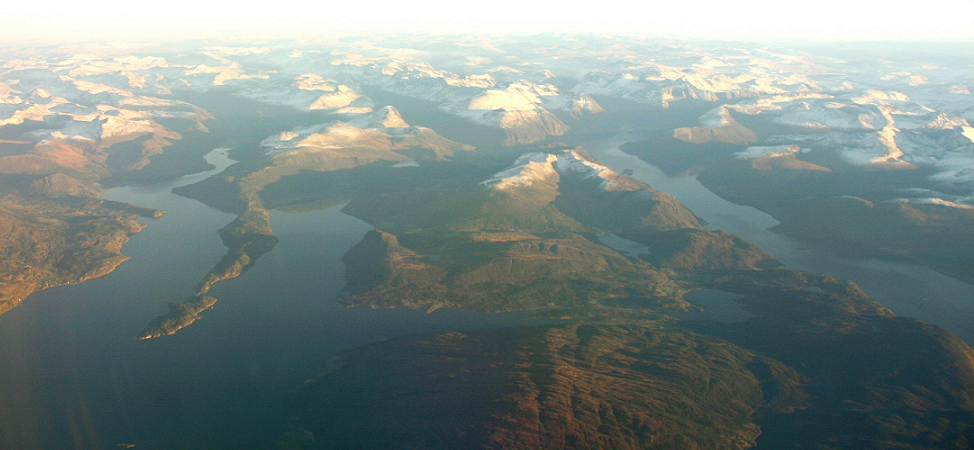
View of Nordmøre

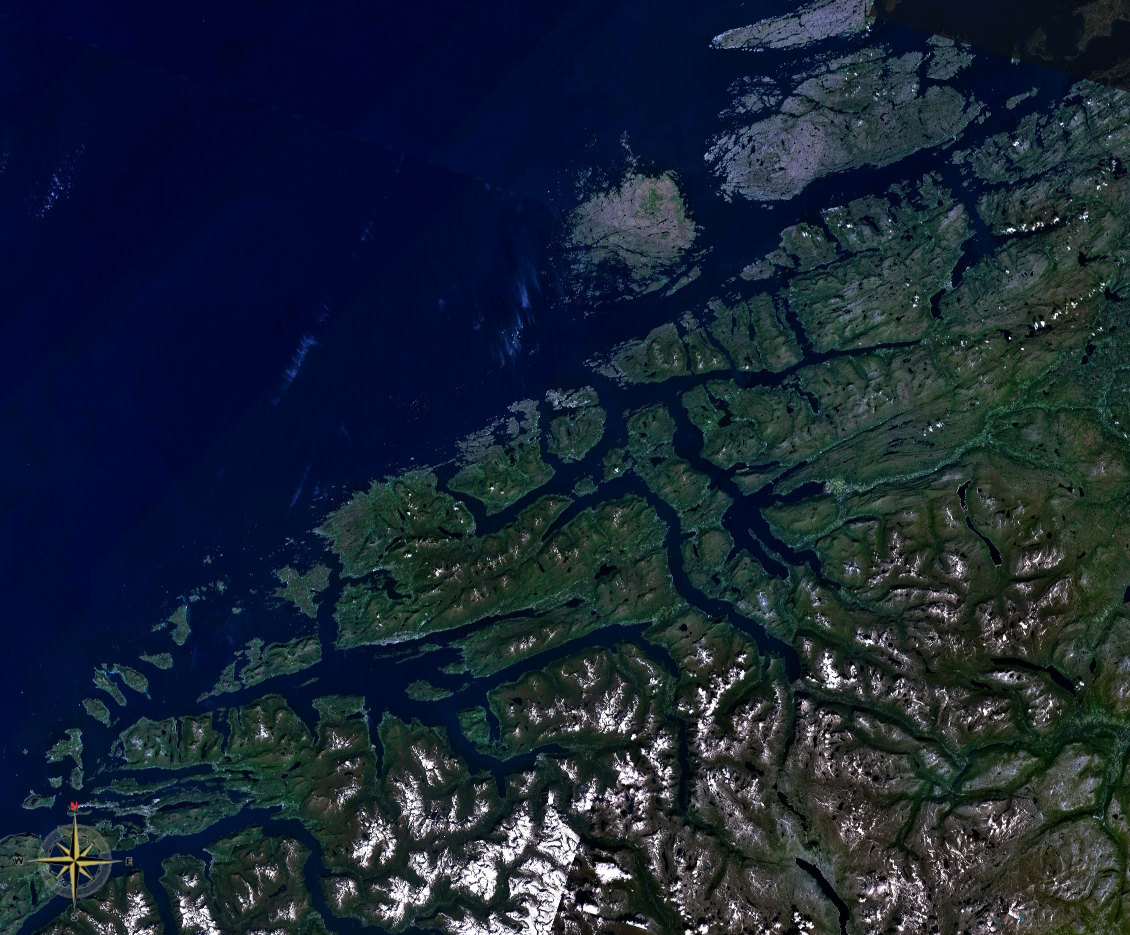
Satellite view of the region

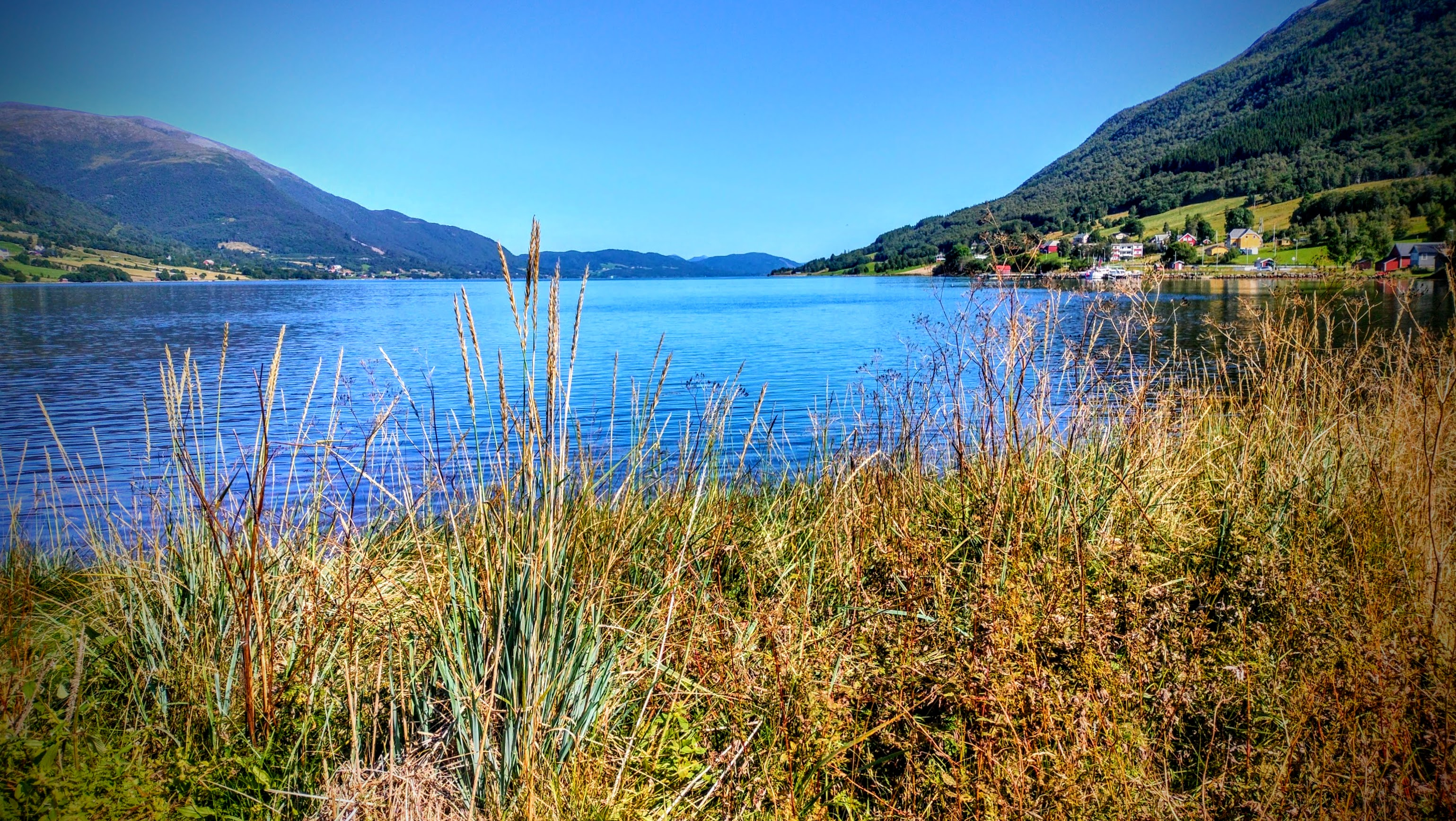
The Batnfjorden fjord

== See also ==
- Sunnmøre
- Romsdal
