= Churches in Norway =

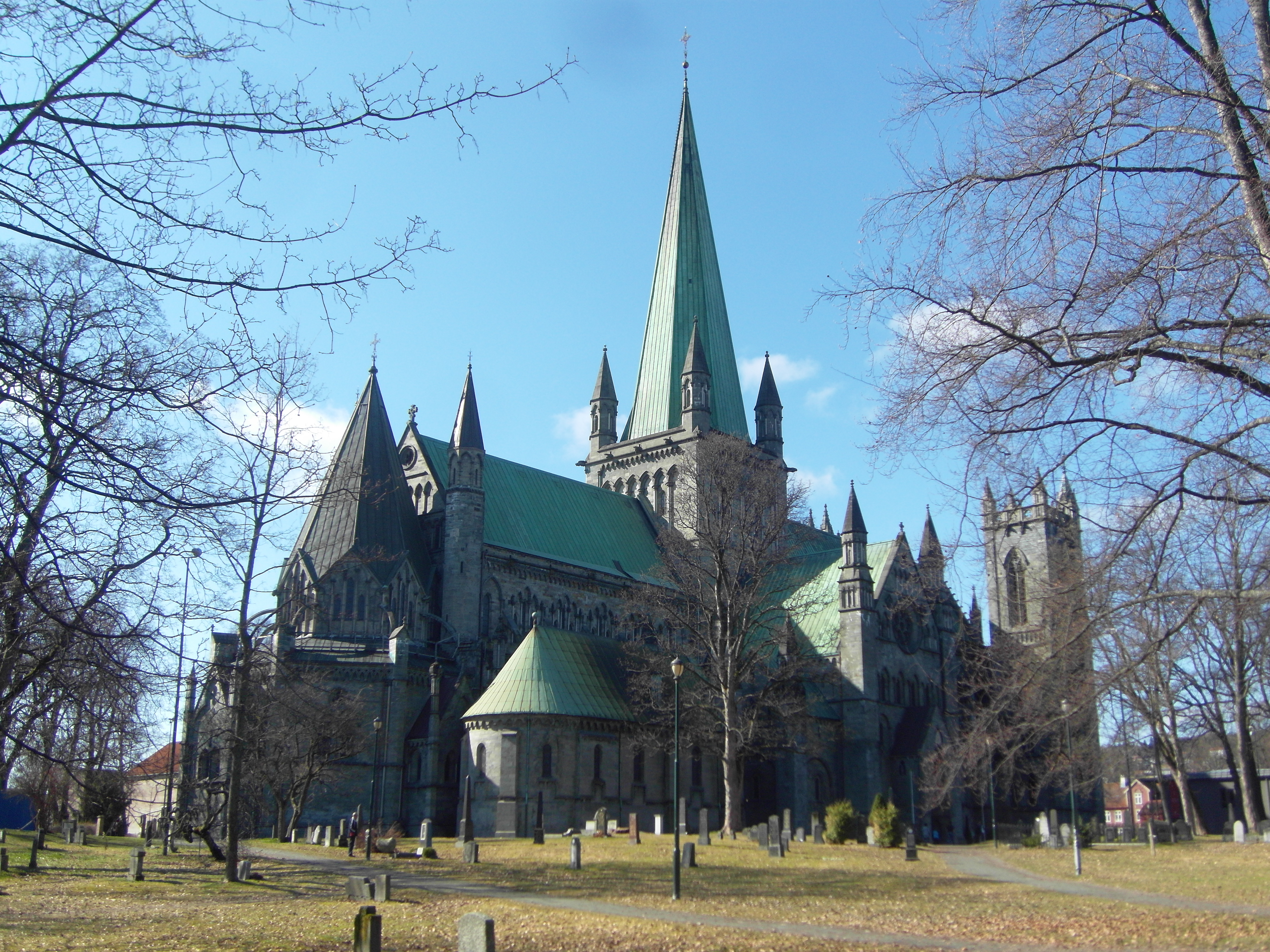
Nidaros Cathedral (11th century) is one of the largest and oldest in Norway.

Church building in Norway began when Christianity was established there around the year 1000. The first buildings may have been post churches erected in the 10th or 11th century, but the evidence is inconclusive. For instance under Urnes Stave Church and Lom Stave Church there are traces of older post churches. Post churches were later replaced by the more durable stave churches. About 1,300 churches were built during the 12th and 13th centuries in what was Norway's first building boom. A total of about 3,000 churches have been built in Norway, although nearly half of them have perished. From 1620 systematic records and accounts were kept although sources prior to 1620 are fragmented. Evidence about early and medieval churches is partly archaeological. The "long church" is the most common type of church in Norway. There are about 1620 buildings recognized as churches affiliated with the Church of Norway. In addition, there are a number of gospel halls belonging to the lay movement affiliated with the Church of Norway (not regarded as church buildings) as well as churches belonging to other Christian bodies. Until the 20th century, most churches were built from wood. 220 buildings are protected by law, and an additional 765 are listed as valuable cultural heritage.

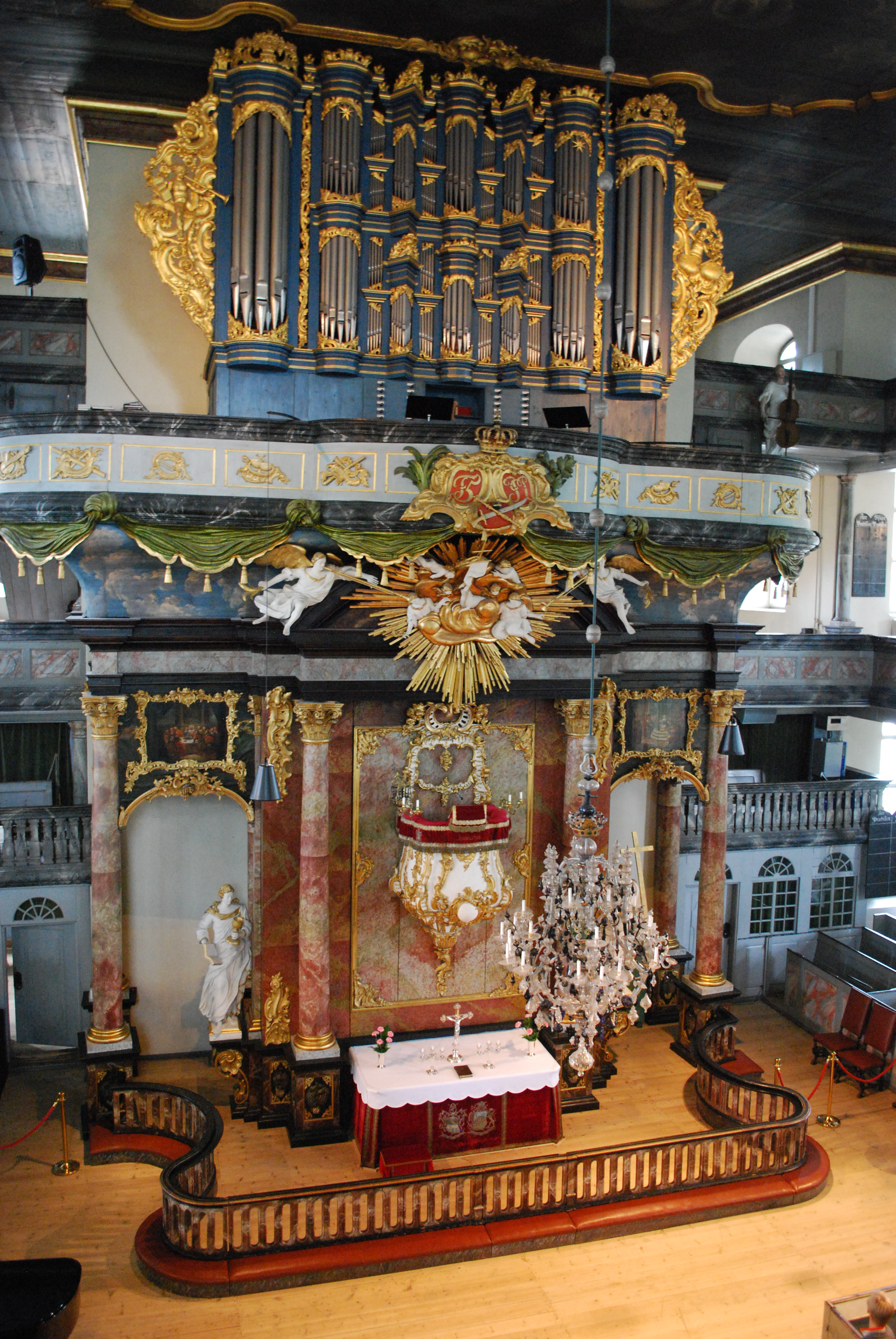
Pulpit-altar and organ, Kongsberg Church.

== Context ==
=== Institutional ===
From early Christian times, a clerical administrative subdivision was established. For instance, in Hordaland there were subdivisions as one fourth ("fjordung" or "fjerding") or one eighth ("åttung") of a county, each with its own main church. For instance Old Sakshaug Church was the main church for one of the four districts of Inntrøndelag.

Church building has been influenced by the role of the State or the Crown. The Reformation in Norway was accomplished by force in 1537 when Christian III of Denmark and Norway declared Lutheranism as the official religion of Norway and Denmark. The Crown then took over church property, while some churches were plundered and abandoned. After the reformation bishops were appointed by the king, while after the introduction of absolute monarchy in 1660 all clerics were civil servants appointed by the Danish king. When a liberal constitution was introduced after independence from Denmark in 1814, the Lutheran church was recognized as the State Church. The ban on Catholicism within Norway was lifted in 1843, while the ban on monastic orders were formally lifted in 1897. After the 1814 events, Norway was no longer under Danish rule and instead entered into a personal union with Sweden. A civil administration and national institutions were subsequently established within present day Norway.

The Church of Norway is organized in 11 dioceses plus one presiding bishop. A cathedral (Norwegian: katedral) is the seat of a bishop, and "domkirke" (or merely "dom") refers to the function or status of the church, not the design, style or size of the building. Some churches in Norway are nicknamed cathedral or "dom" because of their size or architectural significance. The catholic church in Norway is organized in three dioceses, each with their own cathedral.

The 1851 Church Act mandated that each church should accommodate at least 30% of the residents in the parish. The 623 churches from the late 1800s are thus relatively large. In the 19th century, a large number of churches were built according to basic prototypes compiled by architect Jacob Wilhelm Nordan, for instance Gjøvik Church. About 100 churches were erected according to Nordan's drawings, more than by any other architect in Norway. The same drawings were often used for more than one church. Drawings for Nes church in Hallingdal compiled by Georg Andreas Bull, were later used to construct Frosta Church. Architects Linstow and Grosch left their mark on the young capital Christiania as well as church building of the 19th century. The 1996 Church Act mandated that church buildings within the Church of Norway must accommodate at least 1/10 of the congregation, but in any case not less than 200 seats and more than 500 seats are not required.

Each church has largely been regarded as an independent public institution ("self-owned"), often with its own assets and land from which it obtained ground lease. The congregation or inhabitants in the parish were responsible for the construction and maintenance of buildings, this principle was established as law at the 1024 Moster Assembly. Around 1700–1720 the crown sold some 600 churches to privates (to fund the expensive war effort), then repurchased during the next 150 years. The Church Act of 1897 confirmed that churches belong to the congregation. A number of churches belong to museums or to the Society for the Preservation of Ancient Norwegian Monuments. Most churches are surrounded by a church yard (mostly used as graveyard) with the same ownership situation as the building. Municipalities are responsible for the funding and operation of churches and adjacent land, while management and oversight are (since the 1996 Church Act) in the hands of the parish council (the congregation's elected body) and an employed executive officer. While the Church of Norway is a branch of the national government, the state itself does not generally own church buildings. Exceptions include the church at Akershus Fortress and Svalbard Church. Nidaros Cathedral may also be regarded as property of the Norwegian government because the cathedral restoration works since 1869 has obtained substantial funds through the state budget.

All cultural artifacts older than 1537 (the Reformation) and all buildings older than 1650 are automatically protected by law. Protection status does not alter ownership status.

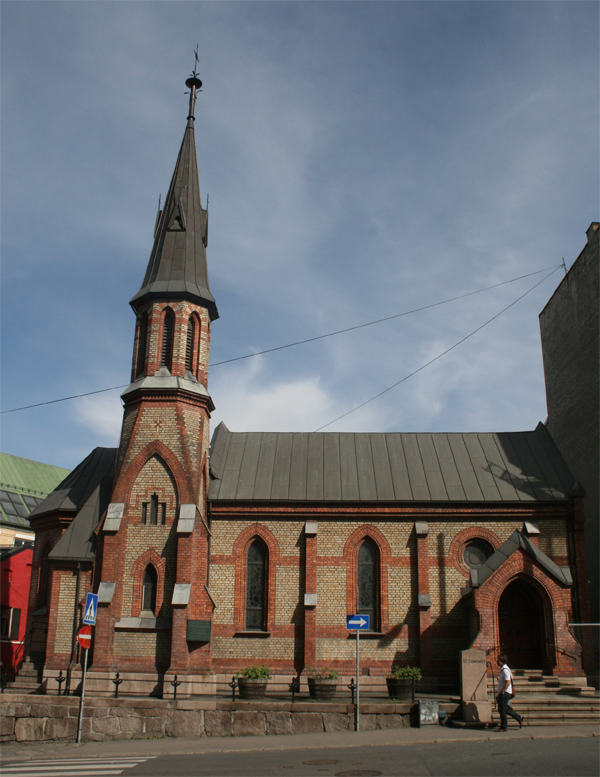
The Anglican St. Edmund's Church neo-gothic (1884)

Elections for the Constituent Assembly at Eidsvoll were done in churches throughout the country (after a forceful speech by the priest). About 180 of 300 church buildings used as polling stations in 1814 remain.

=== Demographics ===
There are no records about the population during Middle Ages, but before the Black Death Norway had about 300,000 to 400,000 inhabitants (around 1650 the total population was again at this level), around the time of the Reformation there were less than 200,000 people living in Norway. When church building began around 1050 the total population has been estimated to around 200,000. After the Black Death a large number of settlements were abandoned and left behind deserted-farms, in the most marginal agricultural areas some 80% of farms were abandoned, several trading posts or small towns such Skien, Veøy, and Borgund (Ålesund) ceased to function as towns. In 1650 Norway had about 400,000 inhabitants (90% rural), by 1801 these numbers had doubled. By 1946 Norway's population was more than 3 million about 50% in rural areas. In the late Middle Ages the church's revenues were down to 20–25% compared to the times before the Black Death.

As of 2012, 76% of Norway's inhabitants are members of the Church of Norway (down from 86% in 2001), while an additional 5.6% are members of other Christian denominations. About 1600 church buildings are affiliated with the Church of Norway. The Catholic church of Norway has about 100,000 members (2012 numbers) and is organised in 35 congregations with their own churches.

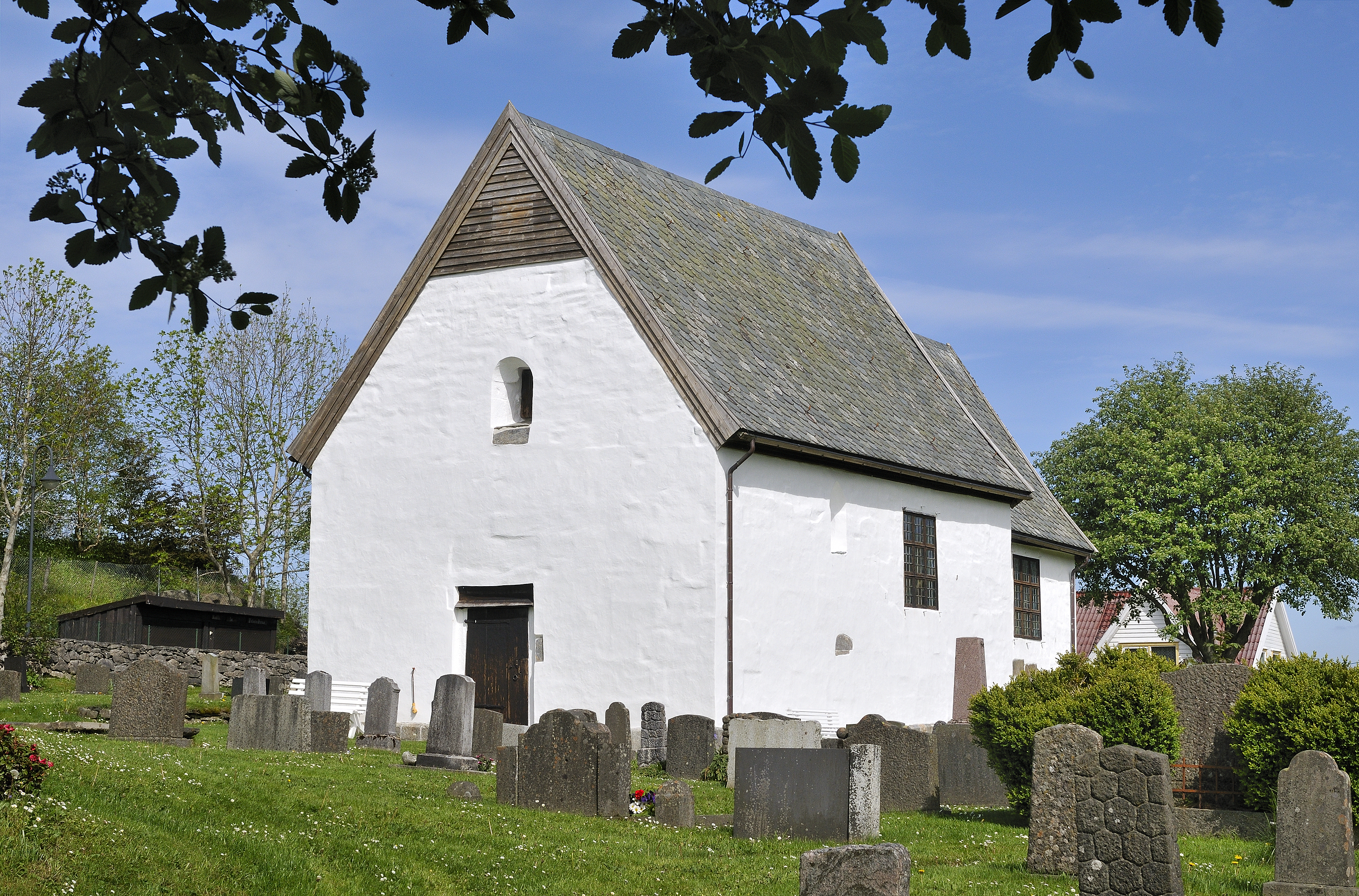
Old Moster Church, possibly the oldest in Norway, site of the Moster Thing where Christianity was made law of the land (around 1024).

Unlike Norway's Scandinavian neighbours, there were virtually no nobility and few resources have been allocated to the construction of palaces and manors. Instead, communities invested their joint resources in church building. Churches are therefore Norway's most important heritage with regard to the development of art, architecture and building technology. About 250 secular medieval buildings still exist, mostly buildings related to farms.

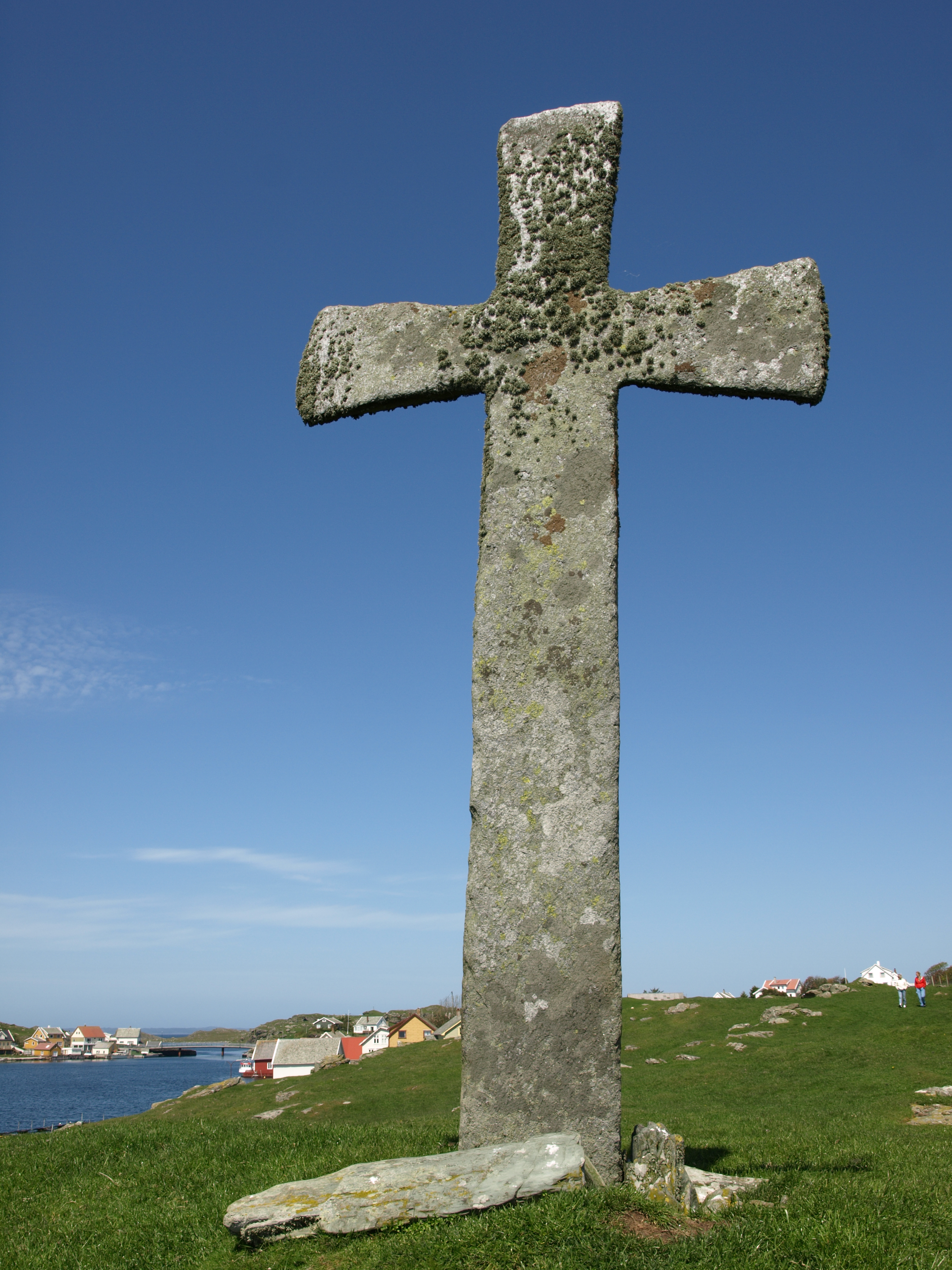
The 4 m tall stone cross on Kvitsøy Island, Rogaland.

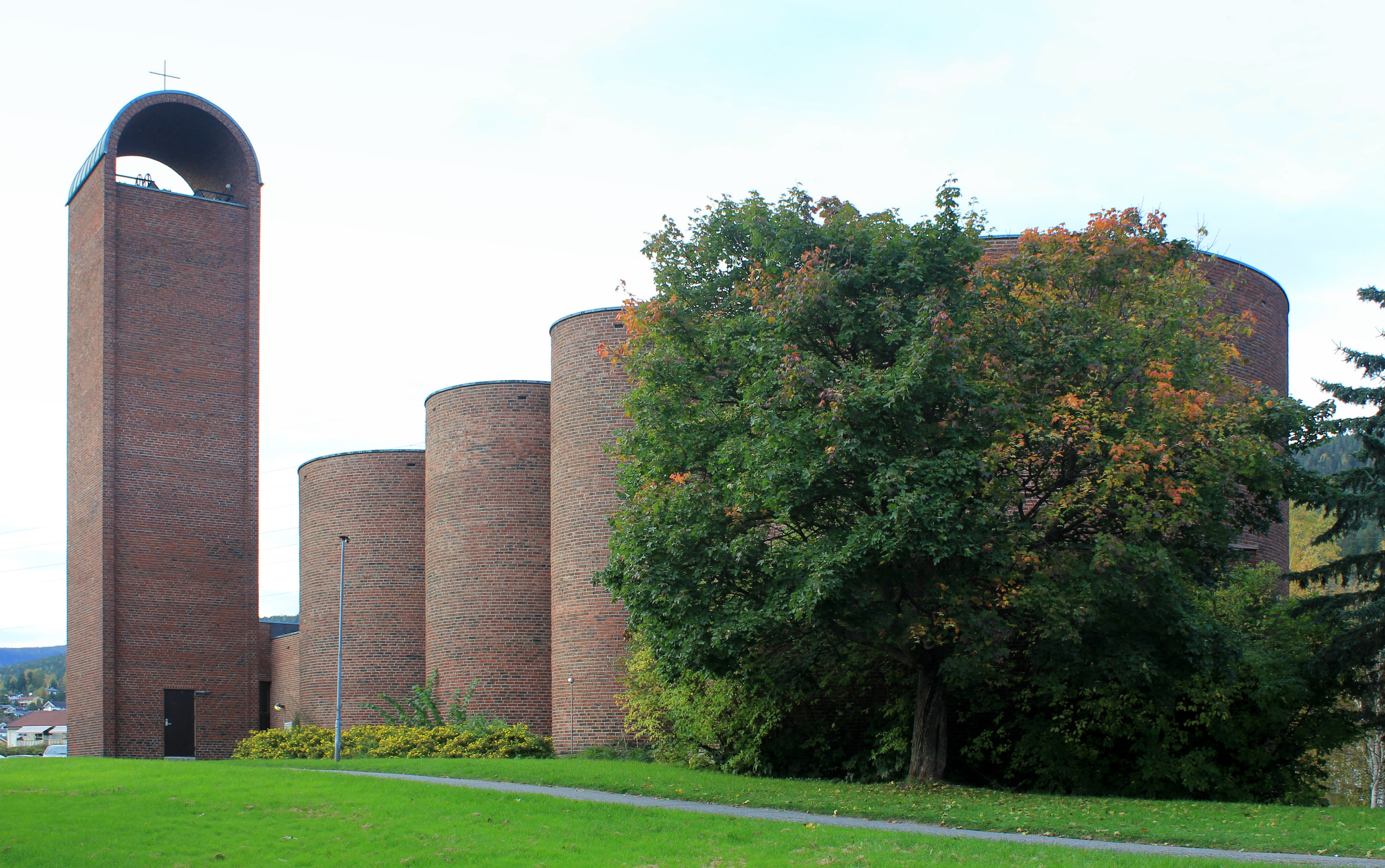
Åssiden Church, Drammen Municipality, modern brick building (1967)

=== Location ===
Early churches may have been built on sites of pre-Christian worship. Prehistorical burial sites (notably burial mounds) at or near the sites of several churches, for instance at Avaldsnes, suggests continuity from pre-Christian times. In West Norway, it was also typical that churches were erected at or in connection to the largest or dominant farm in each district. Some of these may originally have been so-called "pillow" or "convenience" (private) churches for rich families or the local chief. Stone churches were more common in cities, along the outer coast, in rich agricultural areas in East Norway and Trøndelag, and in regional centres in fjord districts of West Norway; while stave churches were more common in rural or sparsely populated areas.

=== Timeline ===
Time	Events	Church building
10th century	State-building in West Norway. Christianity introduced, Anglo-Norwegian stone crosses erected.	Possibly first churches
11th century	Moster Thing (1024) accepts Christianity as the universal faith and law in Norway.	Church building begins. Post churches.
12th–13th centuries	Archdiocese of Nidaros (1152) established. Civil wars. Early urbanization.	Church building boom. Stave church era.
1349–1350	Black Death. Population loss. Settlements abandoned.	
15th–16th centuries	The late medieval decline.	No new churches
1536	The Protestant reformation imposed in Denmark–Norway. Churches under the crown.	Catholic churches converted. Catholic art and ornaments subsequently destroyed. Some churches destroyed or decay.
17th–18th centuries	Population growth. Danish king's power consolidated.	Church building resumed, log building dominates. Break with catholic tradition, Protestant style emerged.
1814–	Independence from Denmark. Constitution. State- and nation-building.	Professional architects appear
1851–1940	Urbanization. Church Act 1851	Second building boom. Larger churches. Many ancient churches demolished.
Second World War	German occupation	Some churches destroyed by fire or shelling
Post-war	Reconstruction. Urbanization continued.	New materials. Break from tradition. New churches in suburbs.

== Materials and technique ==
Church building in Norway is characterized by the widespread use of wood constructions. Only in the 20th century, the majority of churches have been built from stone, brick or concrete. The 320 stave churches existing or known around 1800 were mostly in rural or sparsely populated areas. Stone churches were more common in cities, along the outer coast, in rich agricultural areas in East Norway and Trøndelag, and in regional centres in fjord districts of West Norway. For instance the main church in Aurland (Vangen Church) is a stone construction, while the churches in smaller Undredal Stave Church and Flåm Church are wooden. The main churches within the "one-fourth county" clerical subdivision were often built in stone, for instance, the Kinsarvik church in Hardanger district.

Number of buildings by material and period.
Material	Middle Ages (Note: Including perished buildings.)	1537–1700	1701–1800	1801–1850	1851–1900 (Note: In addition, about 60 churches destroyed by fire.)	1901–1940	1945–2004
Wood	about 1,000	51	116	125	460	215	92
Stone (Note: Including brick and concrete.)	271	2	12	10	82	63	225

=== Wood ===
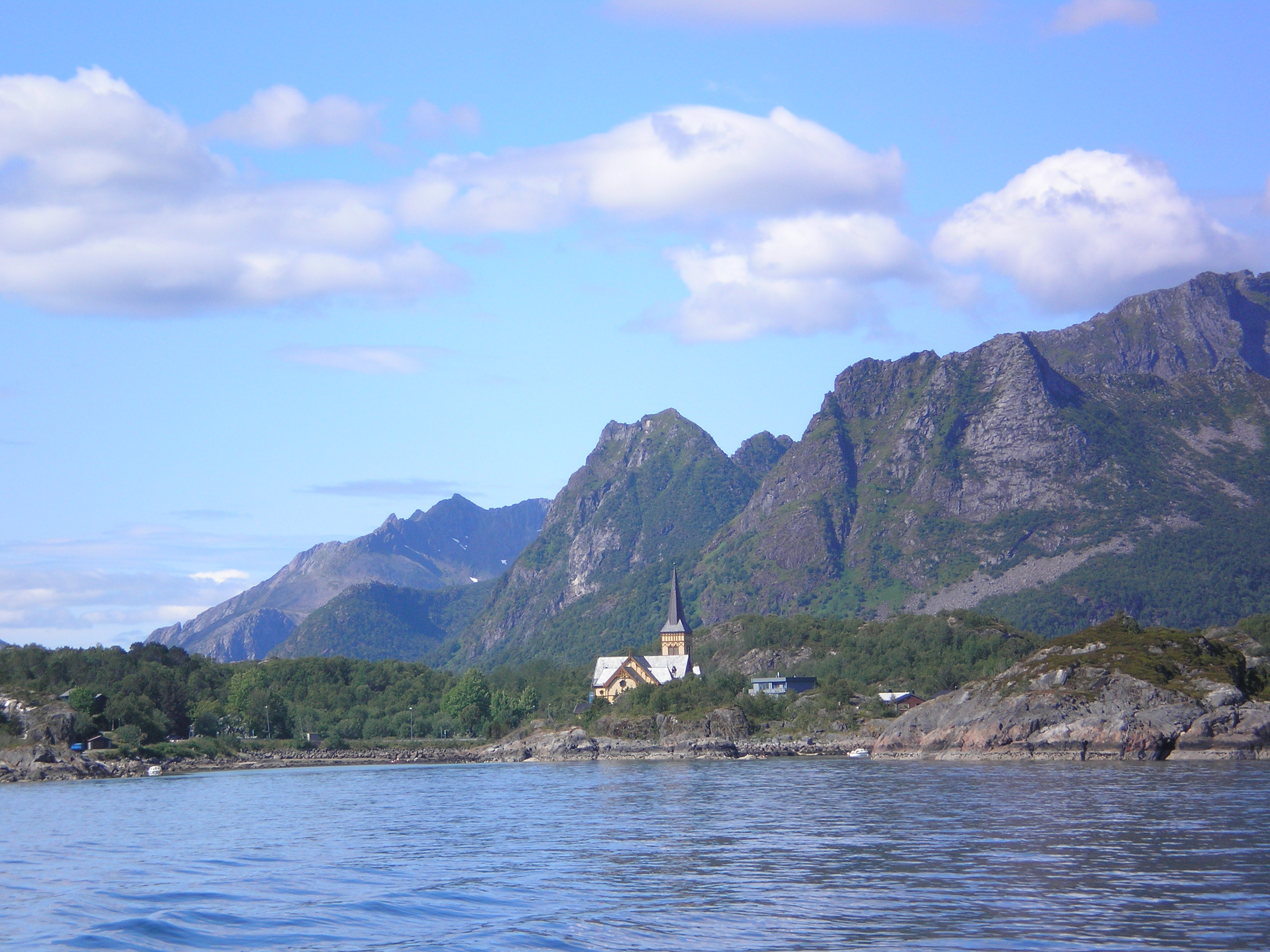
Vågan Church was prepared as a building kit, then transported to Lofoten for assembly. One of the largest wooden churches (1,200 seats).

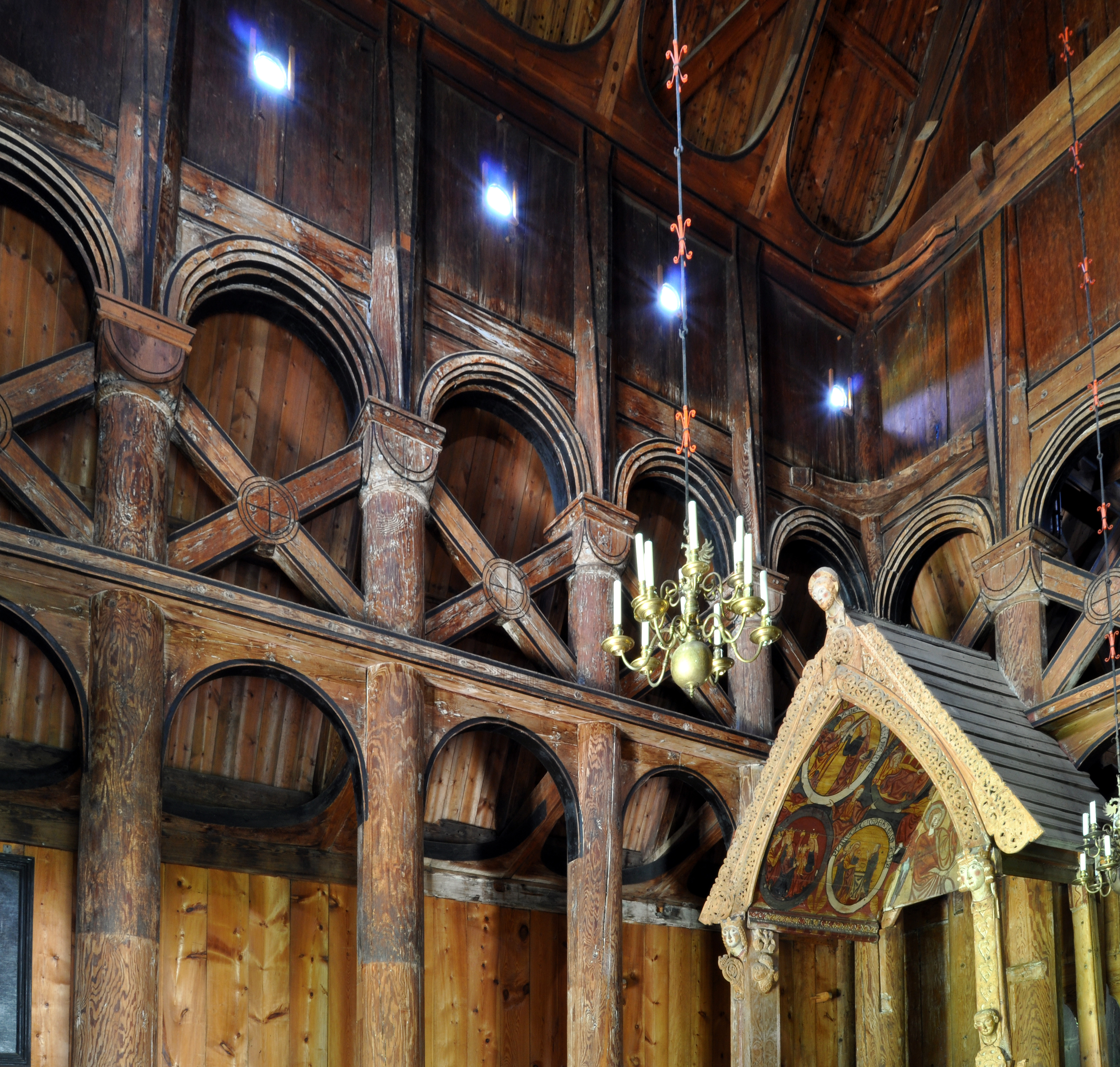
Carpentry and construction inside Hopperstad Stave Church.

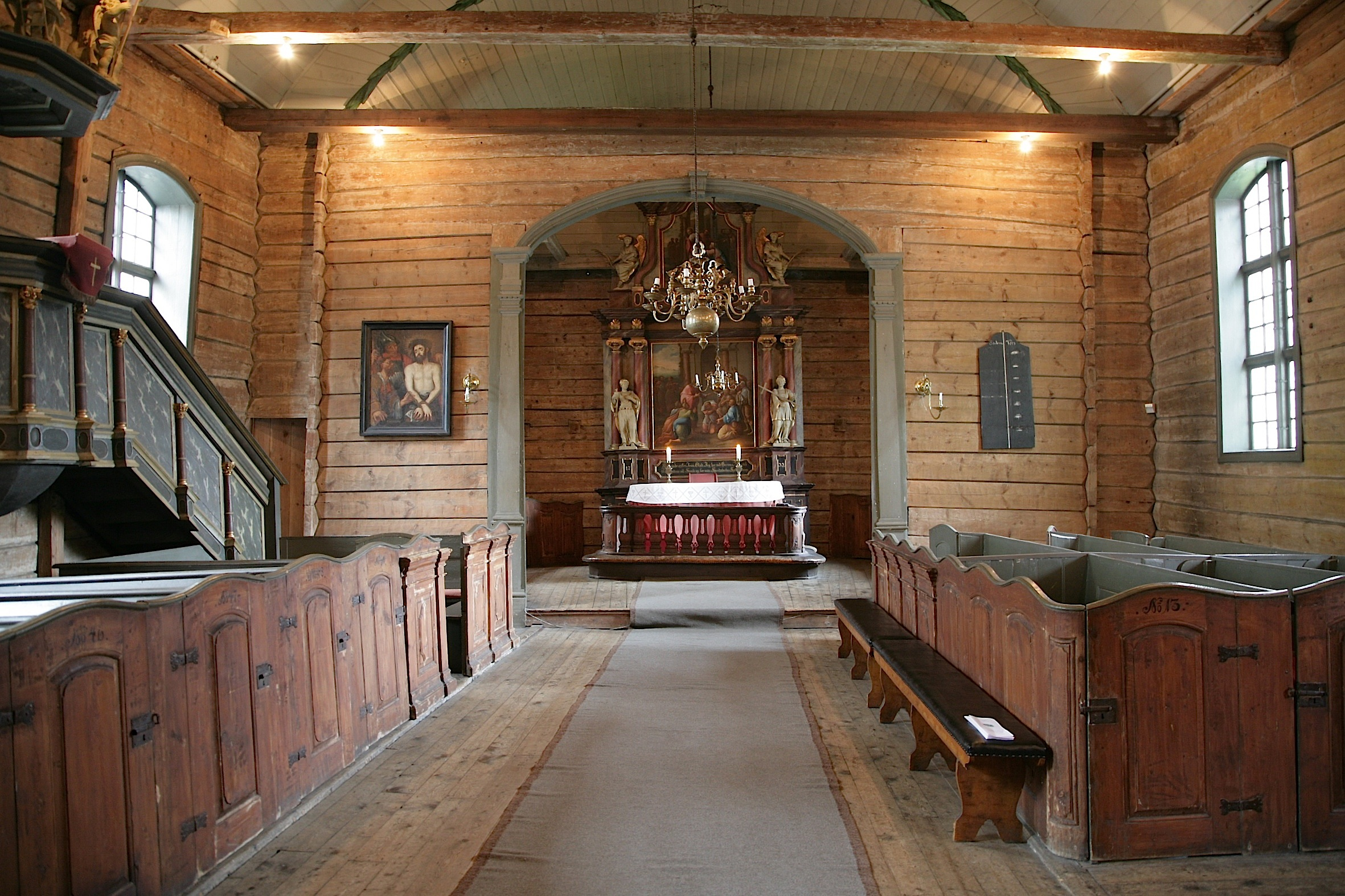
Interior of log-built St Jørgen Church (Bergen) Credit: Nina Aldin Thune.

Church architecture in Norway has relied on wood as the preferred material, particularly in sparsely populated areas. Apart from medieval constructions, churches built until the Second World War are about 90% wooden. The stave church (timber frame) method of construction is believed to be older than the log technique, and the former was completely abandoned after the reformation.

==== Stave churches ====
Once common all over northwestern Europe, most of the surviving stave churches are in Norway. Around 1,000 (or as many as 2,000) stave churches were erected before the Reformation, of which 28 still exist. Prior to the stave technique several (perhaps hundreds) small post churches were erected. In this construction, the posts (the vertical, roof-bearing timbers) were placed directly in excavated holes and thus susceptible to decay. The stave construction instead placed the posts on a line of stones (a foundation) resulting in a durable building. Traces of post holes have been found under some of the existing stave churches. The first St Mary's Church, Oslo was probably an 11th-century post church. While the stave technique was abandoned in church buildings after the reformation, it was retained in the construction of barns and boathouses in Western Norway into the 20th century. Stave churches were usually built entirely from wood, including the roof cover from wood shingle or shakes.

==== Log building ====
After the Protestant reformation when the construction of new (or replacement of old) churches was resumed, wood was still the dominant material but the log technique replaced the stave technique. The log construction gave a lower more sturdy style of building compared to the light and often tall stave churches. Log construction easily became structurally unstable for long and tall walls, particularly if cut through by tall windows. Adding transepts improved the stability of the log technique and is one reason why the cross-shaped floor plan was widely used during 17th and 18th centuries. For instance, the Old Olden Church (1759) replaced a building damaged by a hurricane, the 1759 church was then constructed in cruciform shape to make it withstand the strongest winds. Between the Reformation and modern days, log building was so predominant that some medieval stone churches (such as Søndeled Church and Lunner Church) were enlarged by adding log-built sections. Log buildings are often covered by clapboards concealing the load-bearing structure, one exception is the uncovered logs of Bøverdal Church. After the second world war modern light timber framing technique replaced log construction for wooden churches, only two churches after the war are constructed in log.

The length of trees (logs) also determined the length of walls according to Sæther. In Samnanger church, for instance, outside corners have been cut to avoid splicing logs, the result is an octagonal floor plan rather than rectangular. The cruciform constructions provided a more rigid structure and larger churches, but the view to the pulpit and altar was obstructed by interior corners for seats in the transept. The octagonal floor plan offers good visibility, as well as a rigid structure allowing a relatively wide nave to be constructed – Håkon Christie believes that this is a reason why the octagonal church design became popular during the 1700s. Vreim believes that the introduction of log technique after the reformation resulted in a multitude of church designs in Norway.

==== Other aspects ====
When a log building was complete and all timber fitted, it could easily be dismantled, relocated and rebuilt fitting all pieces in the original order. Elverhøy Church, for instance, was relocated in 1861 and 1975. The previous church building at Sylte was originally standing 4 km further upstream in the valley, about one month after materials had been transported in spring 1812, it was ready to use. Leikanger Church (Herøy) was purchased by and relocated to a neighbouring parish some 80 km by boat. Some stave churches have also been relocated. Fantoft Stave Church was partly constructed from the dismantled stave church at Fortun in Luster Municipality. The previous Norddal Church was a stave church that had been relocated from Sylte across the fjord. Both wood and stone materials from older buildings were often reused. Vågå Church for instance was largely built by materials from the previous stave church on the site. Building materials and interior decorations were often reused in new churches. In 1782 some wood beams from the dismantled stave church were used in the new Norddal Church built on same site. In Norddal Church there is also an altarpiece from around 1510 and a baroque 17th century pulpit previously used in the demolished stave church.

For traditional wood construction, the best quality wood was obtained by cutting the top of pine trees then letting the log accumulate resin for a couple of years.

Fire is a hazard in wood churches. For instance, in the Grue Church fire more than 100 persons died making it the biggest fire disaster recorded in Norway. Some fires have been intentional, notably the destruction of Old Åsane Church of the original Fantoft Stave Church – both later rebuilt as replicas. The original Meldal Church from 1651 burned down in 1981 and the new church copied the style of the original. In 2011 the Østre Porsgrunn Church, once one of Norway's largest wooden churches, was completely destroyed by fire, and reconstruction versus modern church is an ongoing debate. Since 1980 more than 28 church buildings have been destroyed by fire, these were often rebuilt in fireproof brick or concrete.

=== Masonry ===
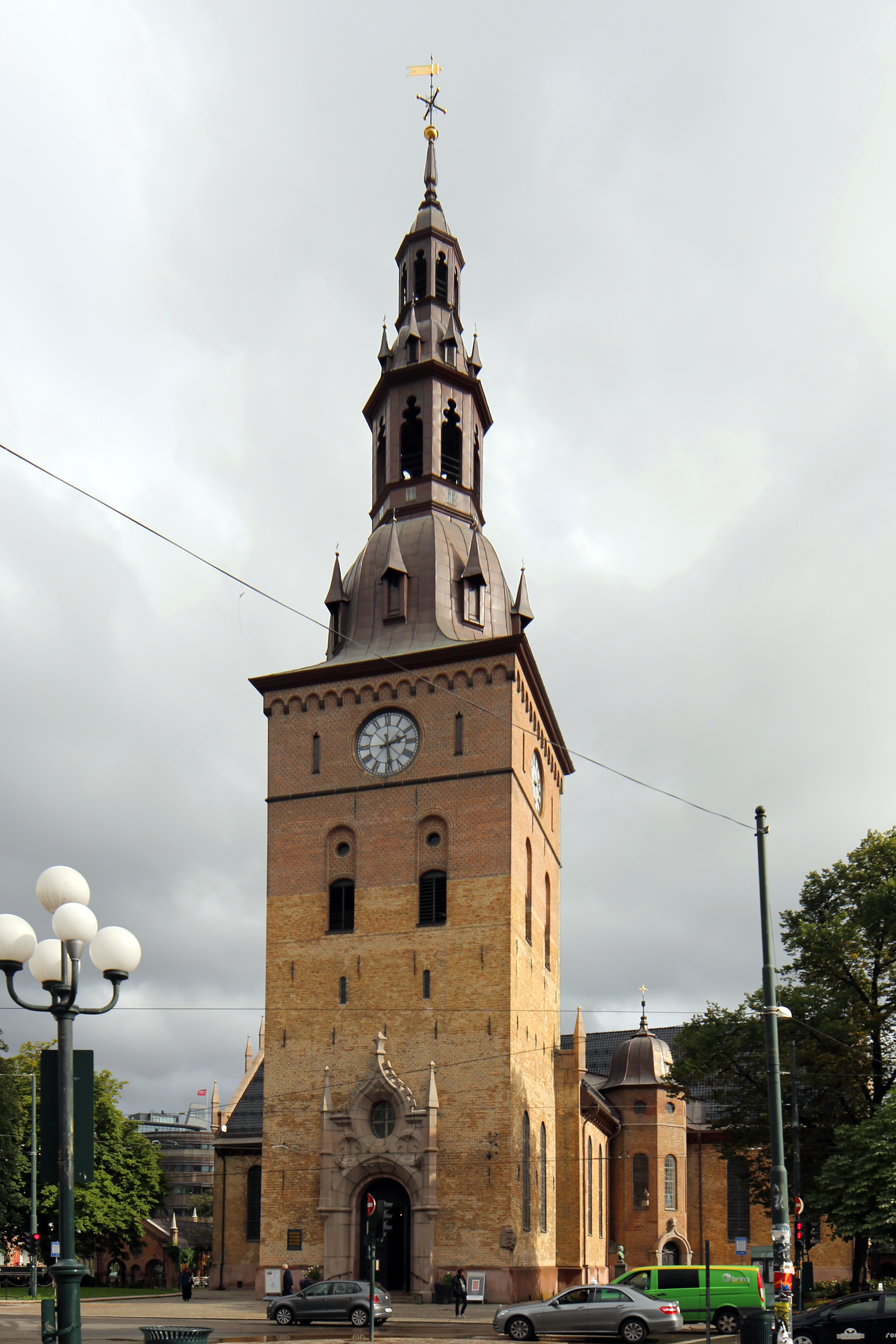
Oslo Cathedral – two brick qualities visible in tower.

Some 157 stone churches from the Middle Ages still exist. The early 12th century stone churches built in Norway's political and business centres implied the introduction of masonry work. Residential stone buildings are unknown until the 13th century and private masonry buildings were generally not constructed in the rural areas. Old stone churches were usually built from naturally occurring stones or stones cut in local quarries. Lime mortar was used to bind stones in these old constructions. Soapstone is a common building material, notably in Nidaros Cathedral as well as St Mary's Church, Bergen and in sorts of decorations that required great detail. For instance, several baptismal fonts are made from soapstone. The widespread use of soapstone is so specific to Norway that Ekroll calls it a "national stone". Soapstone was particularly common in Øsfold, Hordaland, Sogn, Trøndelag and North Norway. Limestone was commonly used in Oslo, Akershus, Hedmark and Oppland; while a local type of marble was used in Møre og Romsdal and Trøndelag. Green slate was commonly used in Rogaland and Trøndelag. Local types of granite was used in Vestfold, Telemark and Agder. The walls of Selje Abbey was covered in local olivine stones. Only the most important medieval churches were built from the most costly ashlar, for instance Nidaros Cathedral, Old Aker Church and Giske Church (a total of some 20 buildings). Other churches were built from stones that were merely roughly fitted to an approximately plane surface. Surviving medieval stone structures are mostly church buildings, only a small number of profane monuments remain, including Håkon's Hall and parts of Akershus Fortress.

Brick was used in the Middle Ages, but in church building it is most visible in a number of large 19th-century city churches including Trinity Church (Arendal), Skien Church, Trinity Church (Oslo) and catholic St. Olav's Cathedral, Oslo. About 170 churches from the 17th and 18th centuries still exist, only 14 of these are built from stone or brick. The Gudbrandsdal Cathedral is one of the few rural stone churches from the 18th century. A stone church was at the time estimated as 50-100% more costly to build than a wooden church. Locals in Gudbrandsdal had an intimate knowledge about wood construction and stone churches were not unknown, but locals did not have the skills to complete such a large stone structure and an expert were called in. Stones were obtained from a quarry nearby. Some 600 churches were erected in the 20th century, and after the second world war about two-thirds were built in concrete or brick. Reinforced concrete allowed new and unusual designs such as the Bodø Cathedral (built as a basilica but without supporting columns), Kirkelandet Church and Arctic Cathedral.

== Designs ==
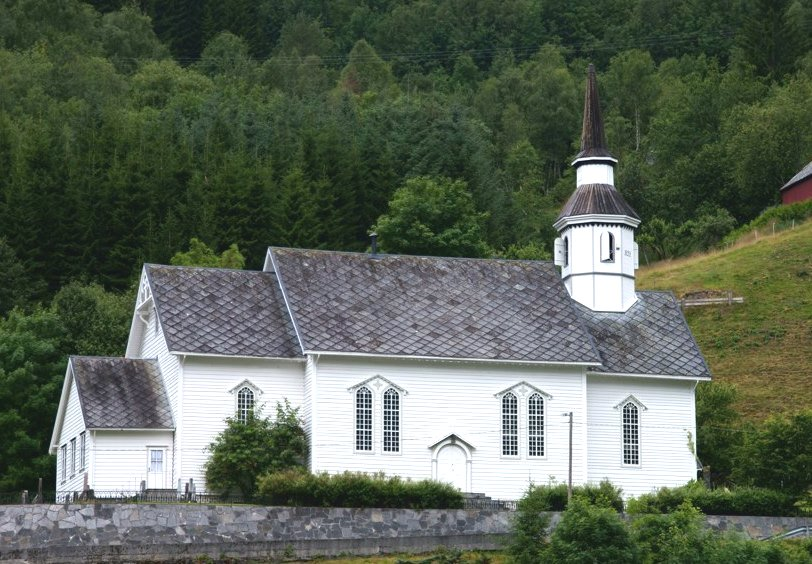
Typical long church of the 19th century, exterior reflects floor plan, left to right: sacristy, chancel, nave, tower resting on vestibule.

Norwegian churches can be described by their floor plan or the basic layout and shape of the interior. The main types mentioned below can be used for classification, although there may be some overlap or combined designs. For instance Dolstad Church has four arms attached to the central octagon creating an octagonal-cruciform floor plan. In some octagonal churches, the chancel and altar are in a separate section attached to the octagonal main body as in long churches.

During the Middle Ages, most churches were built from wood according to the stave church technique. Most masonry churches were originally constructed as long churches and a small number as classical basilicas. Virtually no new churches were built during the 1400 and 1500s. Only a handful new churches was built from the reformation to 1617. After the Protestant Reformation when the construction of new (or replacement of old) churches was resumed in the 17th century, wood was still the dominant material but the log technique became dominant. Catholic church buildings were used as Protestant churches after the Reformation. When church building resumed during the 1600s, a careful break from the Catholic tradition can be observed while during the 1700s a clear preference for Protestant church architecture emerged in Norway. The pulpit became the focal point of the church's inner space according to Protestant ideals where the spoken word (the sermon) should be the central act. The pulpit-altar was introduced, first in Kongsberg Church. During this period there was also a greater variety of floor plans. A few were octagonal while a small number adopted the idiosyncratic Y-shape, including Rennebu Church.

Number of existing buildings by layout and period
Type of building	Medieval	1537–1617	1618–1700	1701–1800	1801–1850	1851–1900	1900–1940	1945–1964	1965–2004
Long (incl hall church and basilica shape)	176	5	31	46	58	469	255	≈ 80%	≈ 15%
Cruciform and Y-shape	3	0	17	72	38	45	20	≈ 5%	
Octagonal	0	0	0	10	38	26	0	7	0
Square and rectangular	9	0	0	0	1	2	3	≈ 10%	≈ 40%

=== Floor plan ===
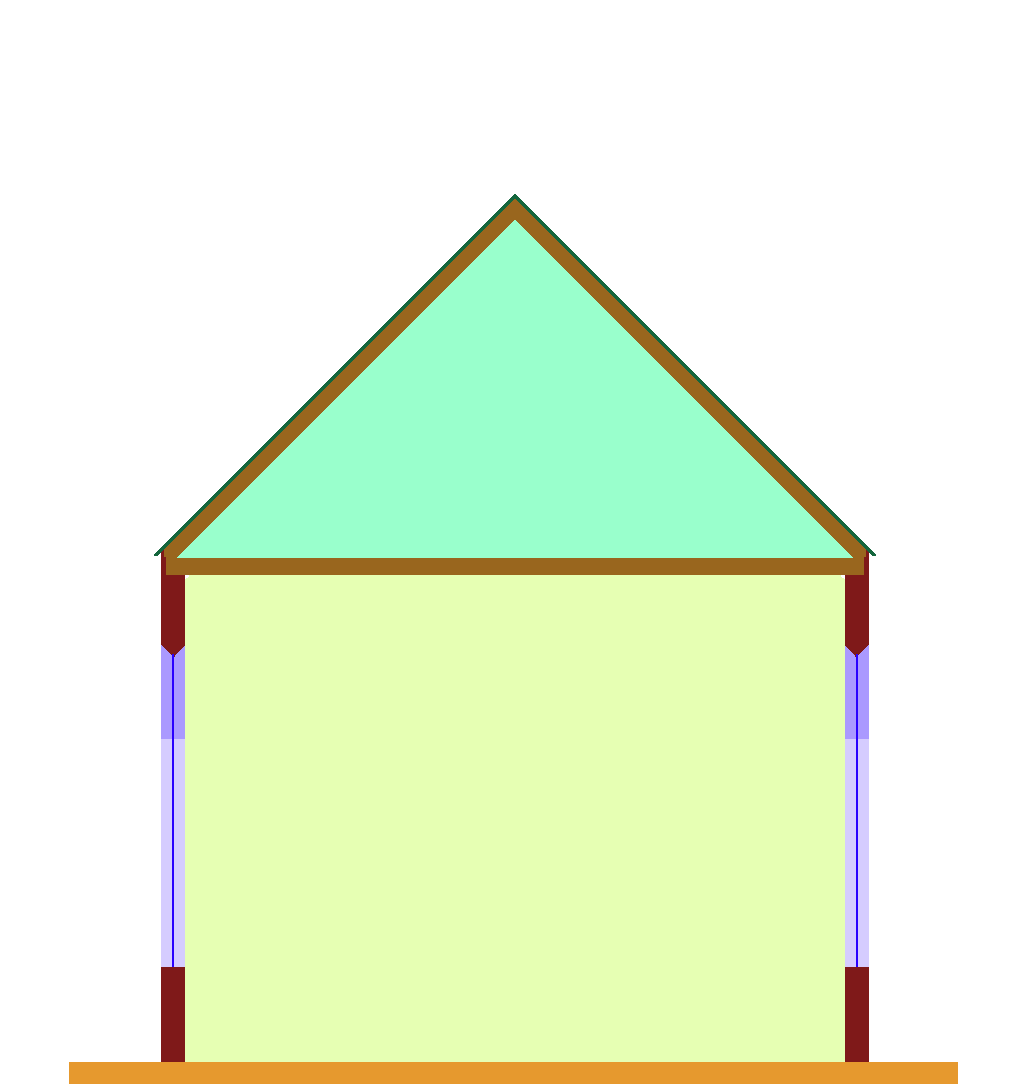
Stylized cross-section of the standard Norwegian long church, here with a horizontal ceiling

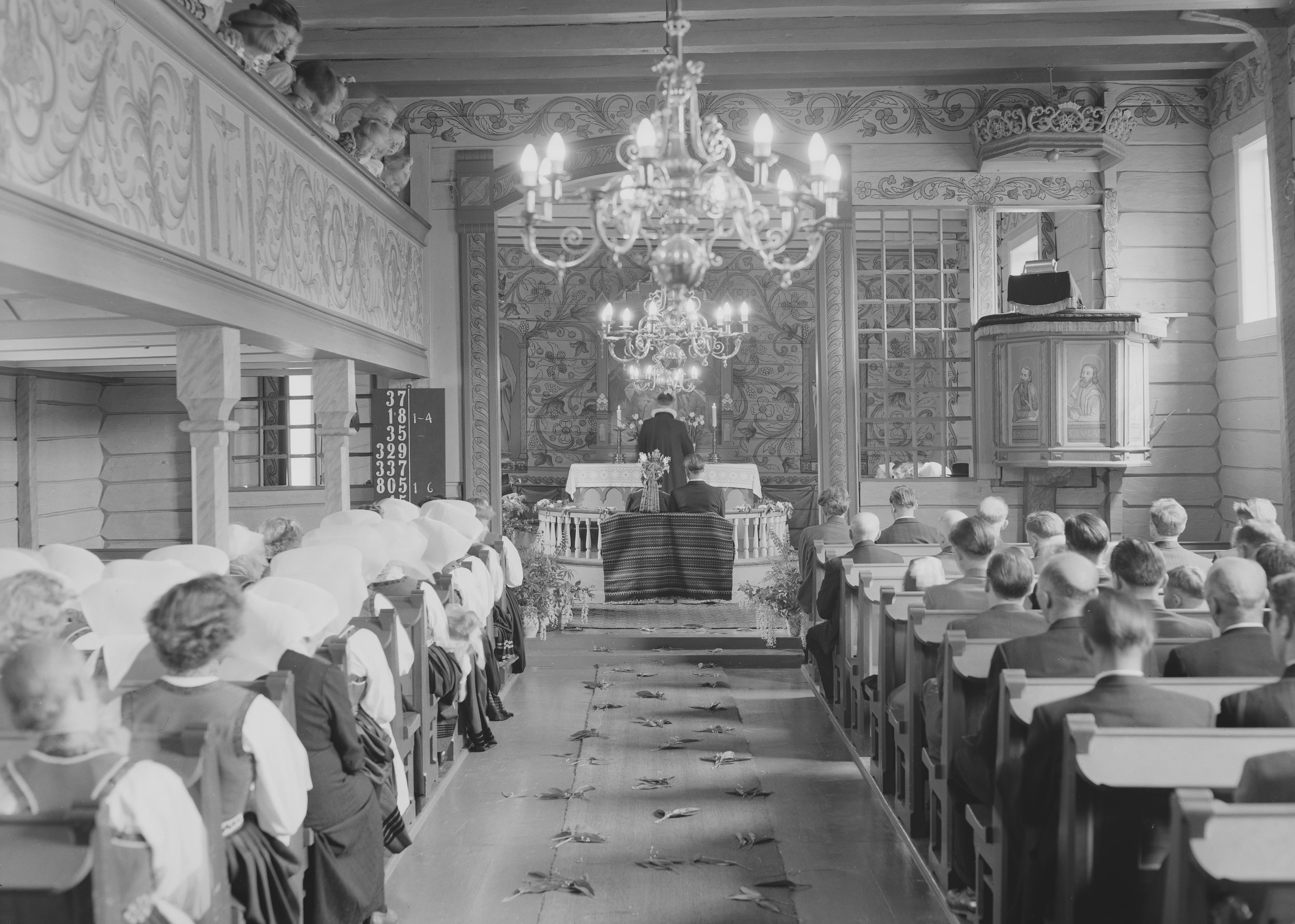
Interior of Granvin Church (1726) a log-built long church typical for Norwegian church building in the 18th century. The interior is decorated with rosemaling. Photo from a wedding, women on the left (in traditional costumes), men on the right, children on the gallery.

==== Long church ====
- The "long church" is the most common type of church in Norway and can be regarded as the prototypical or original church design. Typically it consists of a single rectangular (elongated) room known as the nave (Norwegian: ship) for the congregation, while the choir (Norwegian: kor) is a somewhat narrower room with a lower ceiling and attached to the main body. The long church usually includes a narthex/vestibule in a separate section, often in a somewhat lower and narrower room attached to the main body and traditionally in the eastern end of the building. The bell tower is often integrated with or rests on the vestibule, but may also rest on the roof of the main body. The porch or vestibule is often referred to as a "våpenhus" (meaning "weapon house" or armoury). Visitors stored weapons there because of a prohibition against carrying weapons into the sanctuary, or into houses in general. The long church floor plan is found in medieval stone churches, stave churches, traditional log churches, Neo-Gothic churches, and modern churches. Haltdalen Stave Church is an example of the most basic long church design.
- A few churches in Norway have a basilica design which is fairly similar to the "long church" design. Unlike the hall church or the traditional basilica design, the typical Norwegian long church does not have aisles or colonnades while the basilica does. Old Aker Church is one of the few Norwegian churches built as a traditional basilica, Steinkjer Church is an example of a modern church with a basilica layout. Muri includes basilicas and hall churches in the statistics for long churches. since they are quite similar. The most developed stave churches include elements that resemble basilica design, notably arcades, clerestory and romanesque capitals.

==== Cruciform ====
- Traditional Cruciform: A church may be cruciform or cross-shaped like a Greek Cross or Latin Cross. In the Greek cross floor plan transepts and nave are of approximately equal length. Churches shaped like a Greek cross may also be a type of "central church" where all parts are symmetrical around a central space or vertical axis. Old Olden Church is composed of five 6 metres (20 ft) by 6 metres (20 ft) squares in a symmetrical cruciform layout. The Latin cross has an elongated nave and short transepts. Many cruciform churches in Norwegian have a central tower for example Kors Church and Øksnes Church, in some other cruciform churches the tower is asymmetrical placed on the narthex or vestibule for example Ulvik Church or Oslo Cathedral.
- Y-shape: The Y-shape or star-shape is a slight variation of the cruciform plan and is endemic to Norway. The Y-shape allowed better visibility to the chancel, and men and women were seated in separate arms of the Y. Most cruciform churches from the 17th and 18th century are log buildings. Log construction became structurally unstable for long and tall walls, particularly if cut through by tall windows. Adding transepts improved the stability of the log technique and is one reason why the cruciform floor plan was widely used during the 1600s and 1700s. During the Middle Ages no parish churches were originally built with a cross-shape, but many were later enlarged by adding transepts for instance Haslum Church (Bærum Municipality), Lunner Church or Søndeled Church (Risør Municipality). Nidaros Cathedral also has transepts but may originally have been designed as a basilica without transepts. Several stave churches with a long church floor plan were converted to cruciform in the 17th and 18th centuries. Hedalen Stave Church, for instance, was enlarged (1699) by adding three arms leaving the original long church as the western section of the nave.

==== Octagonal ====
An octagonal church has an octagonal (eight-sided polygon) architectural plan. The exterior and the interior (the nave) may be shaped as eight-sided polygon with approximately equal sides or only the nave is eight-sided supplemented by choir and vestibule (or narthex) attached to the octagon. Some 70 churches in Norway have a predominant octagonal shape, among these Hospitalskirken in Trondheim is the oldest. This type of design spread from the Diocese of Nidaros to other parts of Norway. Virtually all octagonal churches in Norway are constructed as log buildings mostly covered by clapboards. Some of the largest churches in Norway are octagonal, including important cultural heritage monuments such as Trinity Church (Oslo) and Røros Church. A small number of churches in Norway are designed similarly, but with a different number of sides such as the hexagonal-shaped Drageid Chapel.

==== Modern ====
- Modern designs for churches were introduced in Norway after World War II around 1960. After the second world war the traditional long church still dominated until about 1965. After that time two other forms have gained popularity. The first is a purely rectangular (or square) floor plan where the altar is in the nave and not in a separate section such as the choir or chancel. The other is the fan or semicircle floor plans where the altar is also in the same room as the nave. During the 1990s about 80% of new churches are built with a fan-shaped (90°) or semicircle (180°) nave where the altar is centrally located in the nave itself.
- "Work Churches" (Norwegian: arbeidskirker): Modern designs also cover a widened scope of the church building: Torshov Church was one of the first so called "work churches" that may include clerical offices, kindergarten, classrooms and scouting clubs as opposed to traditional churches in Norway which only included a nave, chancel and possibly a sacristy.

=== Stave churches ===
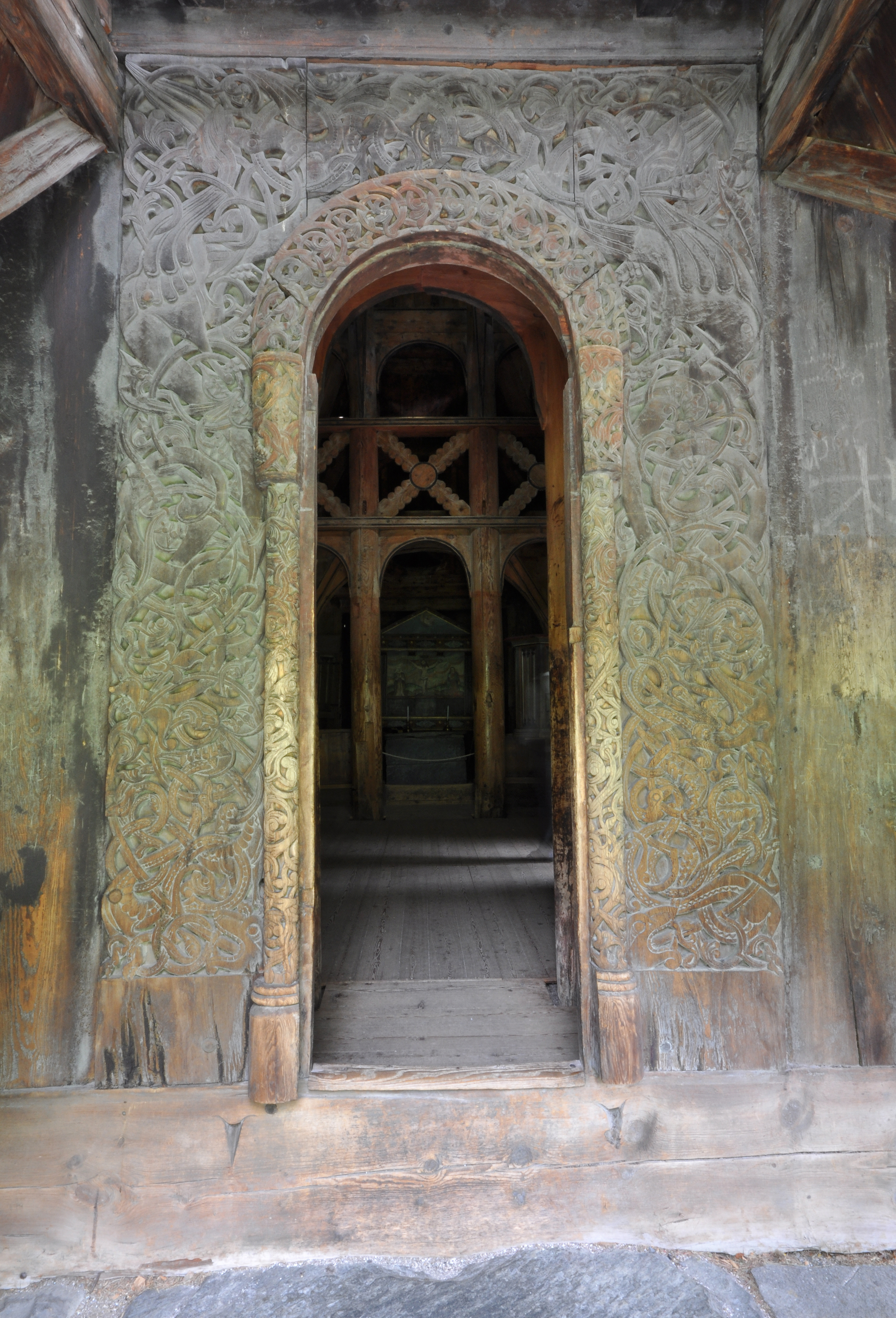
Borgund Stave Church west portal with archivolt.

During the Middle Ages all wooden churches in Norway (about 1,000 in total) were constructed as stave churches, with only 271 masonry constructions. From the stave church period a small number of monumental buildings have survived, including important cultural heritage such as Borgund Stave Church, Urnes Stave Church and Hopperstad Stave Church. The exact origin of the stave churches remains a matter of debate and research. The "basilica theory" proposes that the Norwegian stave churches are of Romanesque basilica form, adapted to wood construction. Anker believes that the influence of foreign stone architecture is primarily found in decorative details. The most basic layout, the long church design with a rectangular nave and separate chancel, is found in for instance Haltdalen Stave Church.

Muri in 1975 made a survey of existing "old churches" (built until the Second World War) and reported the following statistics of floor plans, number of perished/demolished buildings included in table (categories are not mutually exclusive):

Number of buildings by type (until 1940)
Type of building	Existing	Perished
Stave church	31	about 1,000
Medieval stone church	157	114
Long (incl hall church and basilica shape)	850 (Note: When stave churches and medieval stone churches are included the total number is about 1040.)	
Cruciform	190	
Octagonal	74	6
Y-shape	5	5
Square floor plan	15	

=== Style ===
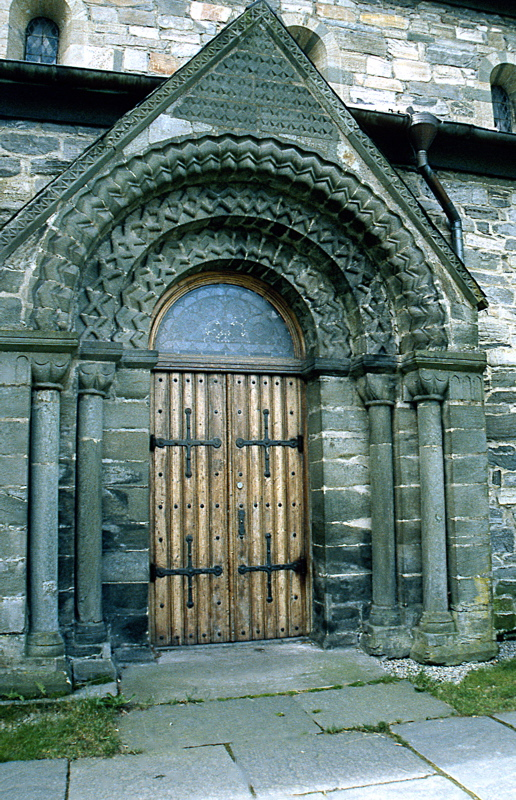
Portal at Stavanger Cathedral with English-Romanesque chevron. Credit: Nina Aldin Thune

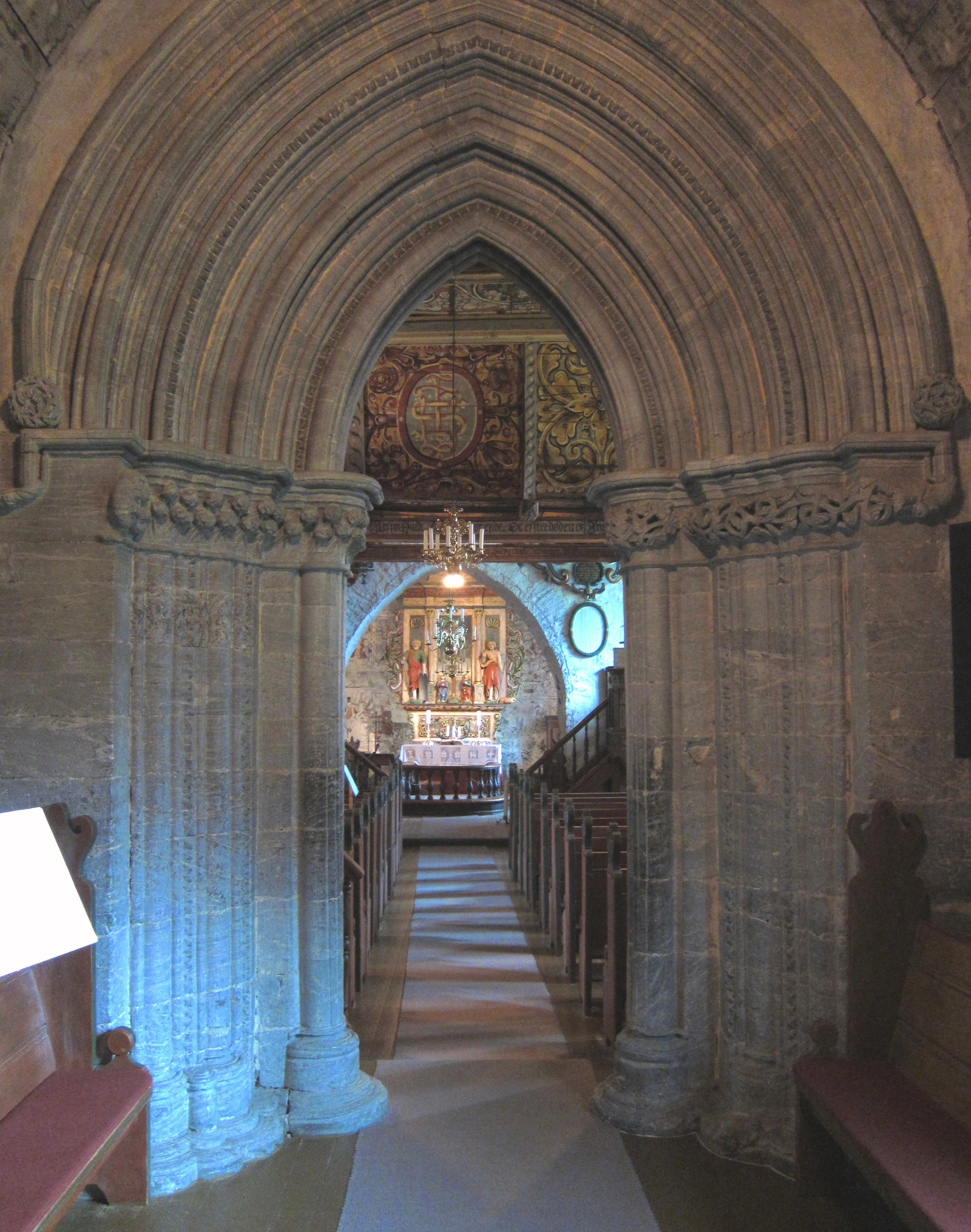
English Gothic portal in Dale Church (about 1250).

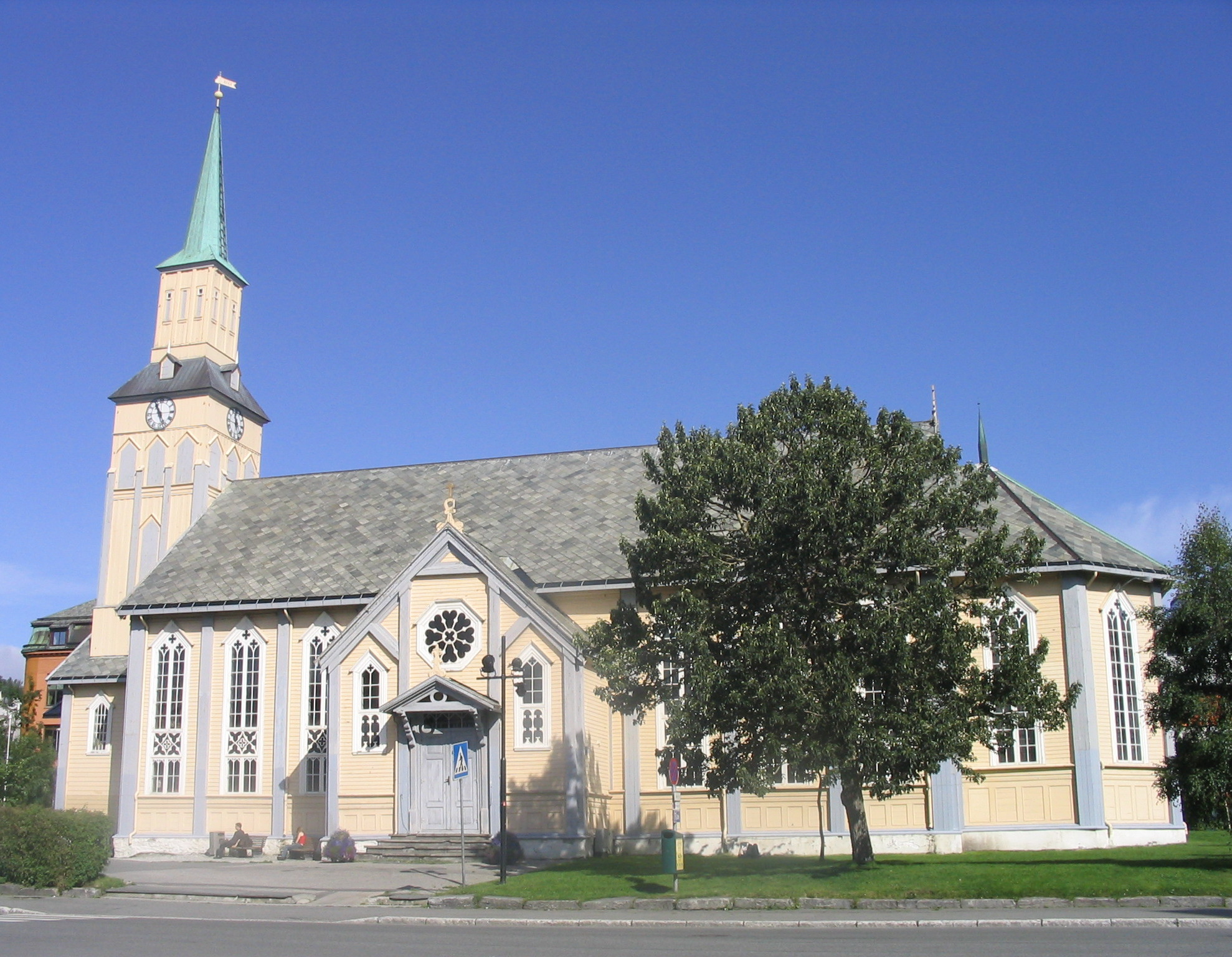
The wooden neo-gothic cathedral in Tromsø

==== Romanesque ====
The first stone churches in Norway were built from around 1100 in Romanesque style and about 15 churches were initiated in the early 12th century. After the Norman conquest of England in 1066, the Anglo-Norman style was the main inspiration for Romanesque church building in West Norway, Agder and Trøndelag. East Norway were more influenced by Danish and German ideals with less emphasis on ornaments. Smaller rural churches are difficult to date, but Ekroll assumes that the Romanesque style was retained longest in rural Norway. Romanesque ornaments continued to be used on wood carvings on stave churches and on profane rural buildings. Notable Romanesque monuments:

- Old Aker Church is primarily a Romanesque (Anglo-Norman) basilica from around 1100, but with some Baroque interior added early 18th century.
- The construction of Stavanger Cathedral began according to Romanesque style (around 1100), then later enlarged in Gothic style (after 1272).
- The transepts of Nidaros Cathedral.
- Talgje Church (12th century, Anglo-Norman style) at Finnøy
- Gjerpen church (12th century, cruciform)
- Sister Churches at Gran (12th century)
- The catholic Hamar Cathedral began as a Romanesque structure around 1150
- Old Sakshaug Church (about 1150), Romanesque-Norman with some Gothic arcs
- Alstadhaug Church began in Anglo-Norman style around 1180, enlarged in early Gothic style 13th century

==== Gothic ====
Gothic style was probably introduced by Håkon Håkonssen around 1240 and the style became dominant during the 13th century until church building came to a standstill after 1300 – lesser work on the Nidaros Cathedral however continued throughout the Middle Ages. Nidaros Cathedral is the only Norwegian church building where the full array of Gothic elements, including flying buttresses, is used. Other buildings with notable Gothic elements or additions include Utstein Abbey and Stavanger Cathedral. The typical rib vault was rarely used in Norwegian medieval Gothic, church builders instead relied on various types of timber roof trusses. One exception is the octagonal apse with rib vaults in Alstadhaug Church, probably inspired by the Nidaros octagon. Voss Church at Vossevangen is a 13th-century stone church in Gothic style, but with a wooden roof construction. The monumental Trondenes Church is a late medieval Gothic building with some Romanesque elements. The great St Magnus Cathedral on Orkney was built during the Norse period when Orkney was under the Archbishop of Nidaros. The soapstone portal in Dale Church (Luster) in English Gothic style is the most "magnificent" in any rural church according to Østby. The modest western entrance of Bergen Cathedral is an example of austere Gothic architecture.

During the church building boom following the 1851 Church Act, several Neo-Gothic churches were built in log and masonry. The large Kristiansand Cathedral for instance is a Neo-Gothic brick and cement construction. Bamble Church is an early example of wood construction Neo-Gothic inspired by local traditions. Tromsø Cathedral is also a wood construction in neo-gothic style. Lillesand Church (1889) were constructed in timber frame with a combination of neo-gothic and Swiss chalet styles.

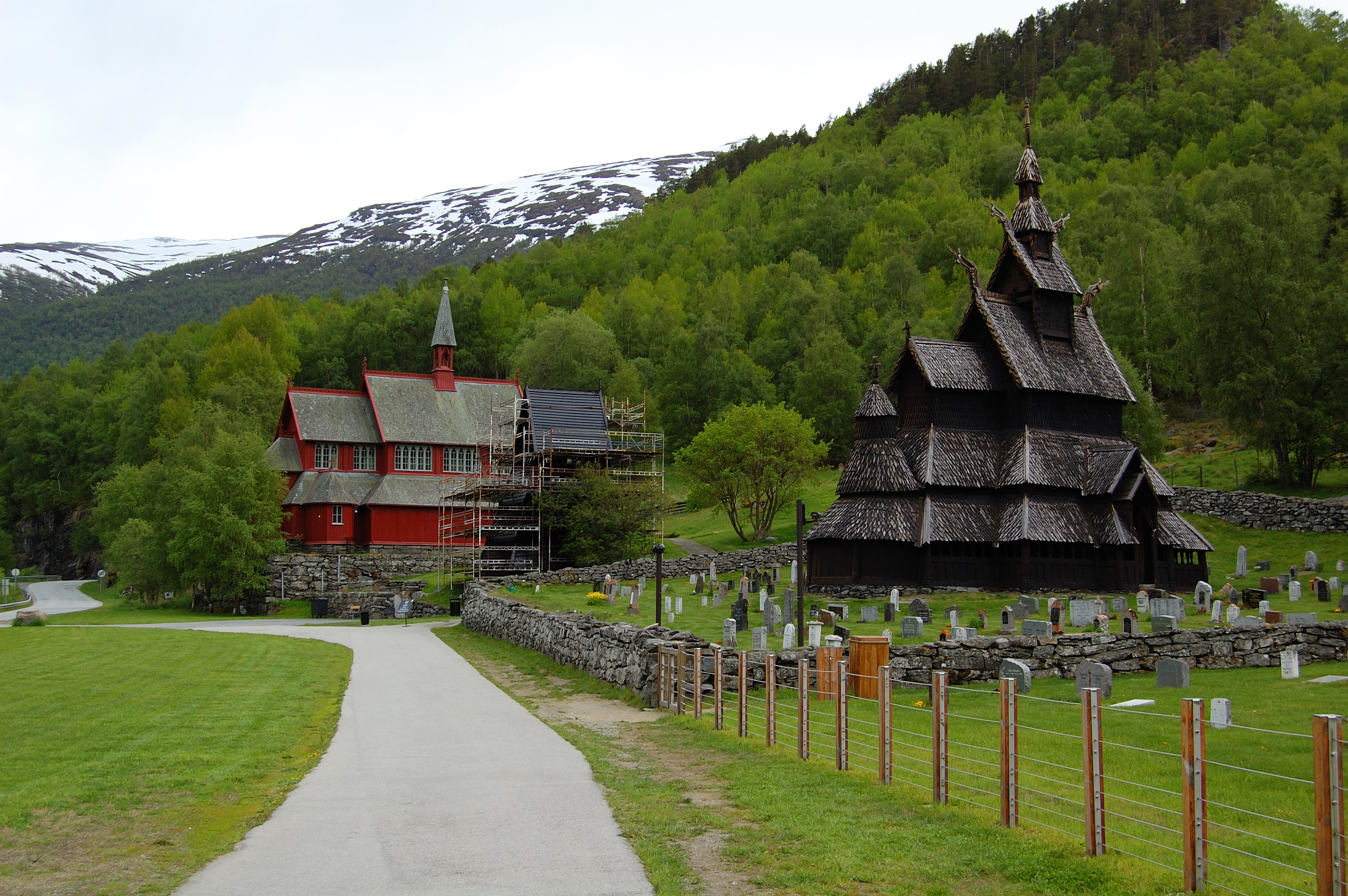
The new Borgund Church is inspired by the stave church

==== Neoclassical ====
Neoclassical architecture in Norway is particularly notable in monumental buildings erected in the young capital Christiania. Leading architects of the time were H.D.F. Linstow and Christian Heinrich Grosch. In addition to works in Oslo, Linstow and Grosch compiled drawings used for about 80 churches each. Grosch's work was first influenced by classicism then from around 1840 he also designed churches in the neo-gothic style.

==== Modern and revival ====
The ancient stave church influenced church building in the 19th and 20th century. Christian Christie designed the new Borgund Church (Sogn og Fjordane) with many features resembling the nearby Borgund Stave Church. Christie also made Årdal Church (Vestland), Hauge Church (in Lærdal Municipality) and Stedje Church (in Sogndal Municipality) churches according to the same design. In the younger Hol Church (Buskerud county) structural features and details are also related to stave churches. The new Veøy Church from 1907 were built in "dragestil" and stave church inspiration, with a basilica-type floorplan. Lillestrøm Church was erected 1935 in classical basilica layout, with a stand-alone square tower and square interior columns.

=== Size ===
Nidaros Cathedral is the only great, Gothic cathedral in Norway, and it is also the largest medieval church in Scandinavia, 102 m long, 50 m wide and 21 m from floor to ceiling inside. Kongsberg Church with an original 2400 seats on 1000 m^{2} is regarded as the largest church building in Norway, now seating is limited to 1100. The Kongsberg Silver Mines made Kongsberg one of the largest and most important towns in Norway during the 17th and 18th centuries. Røros Church seats about 1600 people and is also one of the largest in Norway, and like Kongsberg Church was built in an important mining town. Kongsberg and Røros Churches are the most monumental church buildings from the 18th century according to Østby. Lyngdal Church (Vest-Agder) is one of the largest rural churches with some 1600 seats.

While "cathedral" (Norwegian: domkirke) merely refers to the function or status of the church, not the design, style or size of the building, some churches in Norway are nicknamed "cathedral" or "dom" because of their size or prominence, for instance "Gudbrandsdalsdomen", "Lofotkatedralen", "Sognedomen" and Slidredomen.

Undredal Stave Church and Hopperstad Stave Church are among the smallest with seats for around 30 or 40 visitors. The orthodox Saint George Chapel in Neiden is about 10 m^{2} and possibly the smallest church building in Norway.

According to Lorentz Dietrichson the first stave churches were relatively small, possibly because of the construction technique. Dietrichson identifies "Møre type" stave churches (subgroup of type A single nave) as the youngest as well as the largest among stave churches. He calculated the area of 79 churches and found that the disappeared or destroyed stave churches in Hjørundfjord, Volda and Norddal were more than 3000 square feet, about three times larger than for instance the existing Urnes and Hopperstad churches.

Saint Svithun Church in Stavanger is the largest catholic church in Norway with some 500 seats.

The 1851 Church Act mandated that each church should accommodate at least 30% of the residents in the parish. The 623 churches from the late 1800s are thus relatively large.

=== Ornaments ===
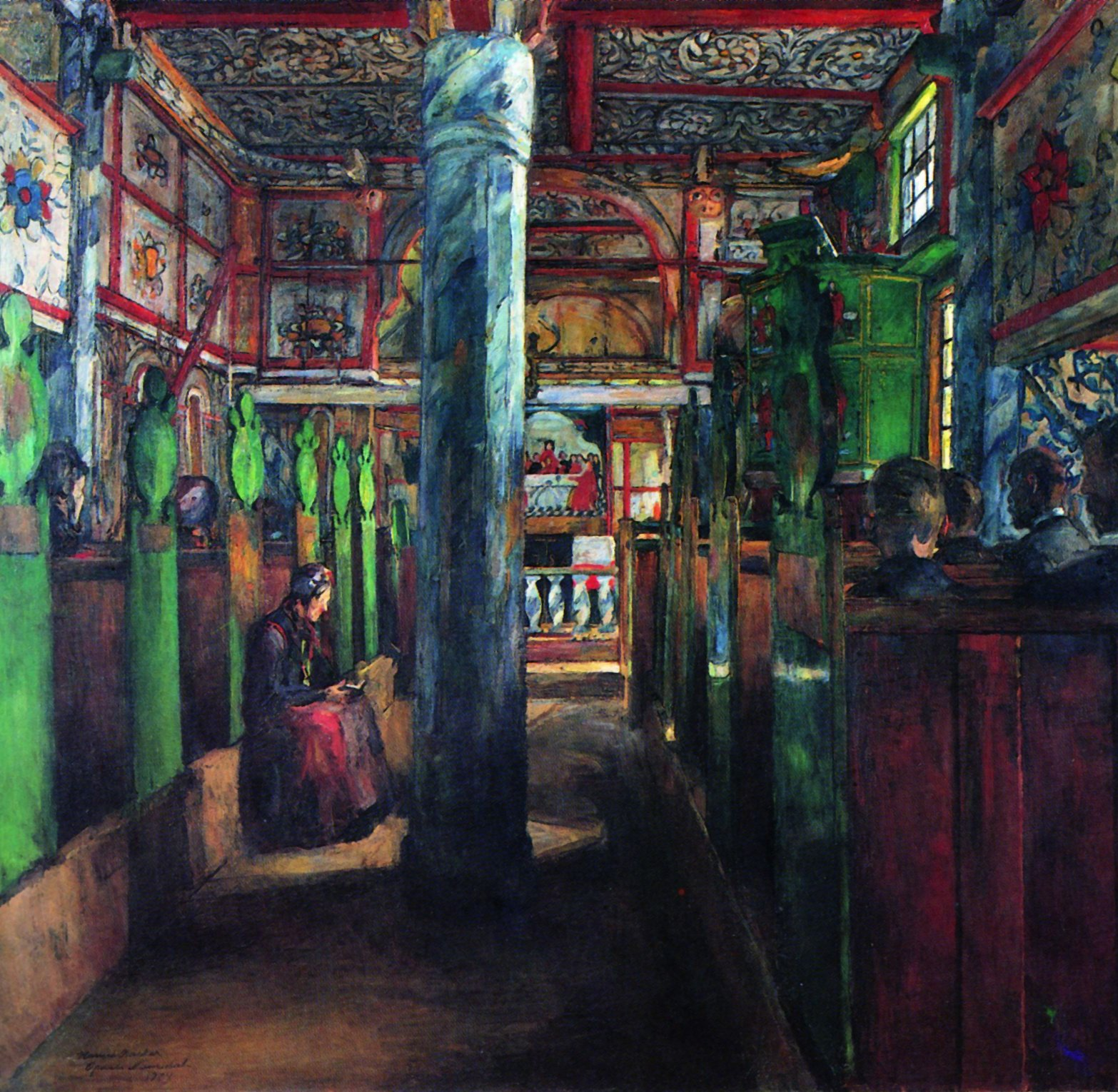
Uvdal Stave Church interior decorations Depicted by Harriet Backer (1909)

The stave churches are noted for their elaborate wood carvings, particularly in doors and portals that are the main decorative elements. These carvings reflect international influences connected with the craftsmen's will and ability to exploit the wooden material. The old door at Urnes Stave Church reflects Viking tradition, later doors show influence from stone architecture. The original animal motives subsequently gave way to plant motives. While no new churches were built during the late medieval decline, decoration and art such as altars and sculptures were still purchased in particular from Lübeck but also other towns in northern Germany or the Netherlands. The lucrative trade in dried cod (via Bergen) allowed a number of high-quality artworks to be purchased to churches in North Norway. Trondenes Church is well known for its rich decorations, and St Mary's Church, Bergen, "German church", has great late-medieval altar-piece produced Bernt Notke. In Ringsaker church there is a unique altar-piece from the workshop of Robert Moreau in Antwerpen.

Pictures and sculptures related to Catholic saints were removed or destroyed after the Reformation, for instance under the supervision of Jens Pedersen Skjelderup, the second Lutheran bishop of Bergen.

Romanesque stone churches include decorations showing lions, snakes, dragons and other imaginative creatures – the actual meaning of these is lost. Within stone churches distinct Christian symbols are often found in wood ornaments such as crucifixes. The Anglo-Norman style influenced Norwegian Romanesque churches, particularly along the Atlantic coast where, for example, the chevron was used in ornaments. Gothic ornaments during the 13th and 14th centuries were also heavily influenced by the English style.

Some churches have a tole painted (rosemaling) interior, for instance Holdhus Church (17th-century paintings), Old Stordal Church (18th century) and Dale Church (Luster) (17th century). Several stone churches are decorated with murals in the interior. For instance in Kinsarvik Church Michael (archangel) is depicted in 13th-century paintings. Other examples of medieval murals or frescoes include Øyestad Church in Arendal, Alstadhaug Church and St Mary's Church, Bergen. Medieval figurative paintings older than the tole painting style exist in Torpo Stave Church. 14th century paintings from the dismantled Ål Stave Church in the University of Oslo museum.

The "Dragon Style" that emerged in the 19th century was partly inspired by stave church style and ornaments, and the public interest in the efforts to save the few remaining stave churches.

Ship models, including models of warships such as in Dolstad Church, has been used as decoration inside churches. This tradition was possibly adopted from Denmark or Northern Germany. These ship models were referred to as votive ships or simply as church ships ("church ship" is also the name Norwegian name for the nave of a church).

Wood carving is still used as a decorative technique, for instance, the new organ in Nordberg Church (Skjåk) is decorated in painted wood carvings.

== Gallery ==
=== Medieval ===
Medieval wooden churches
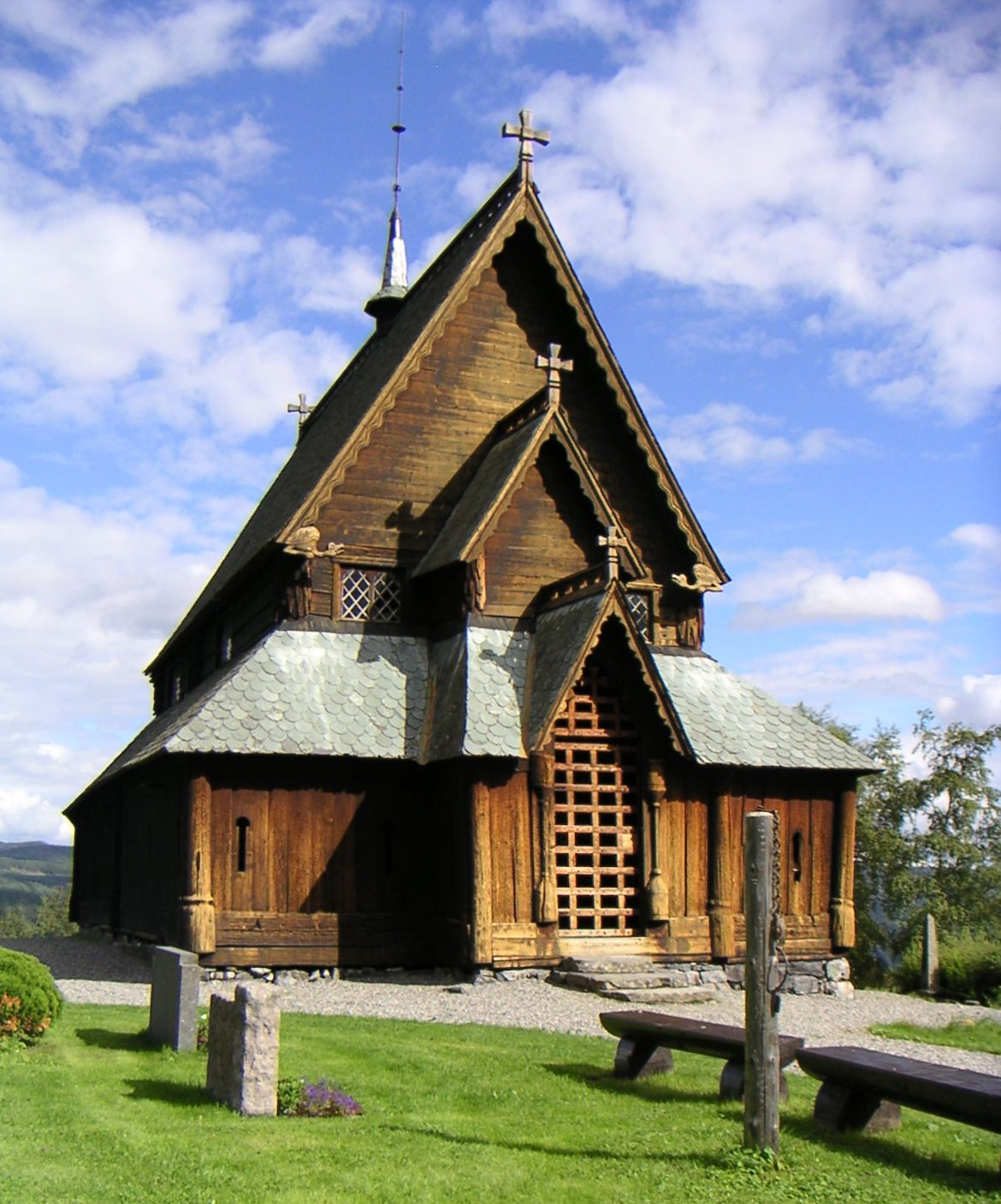
Reinli Stave Church, long church (13th century) photo: John Erling Blad

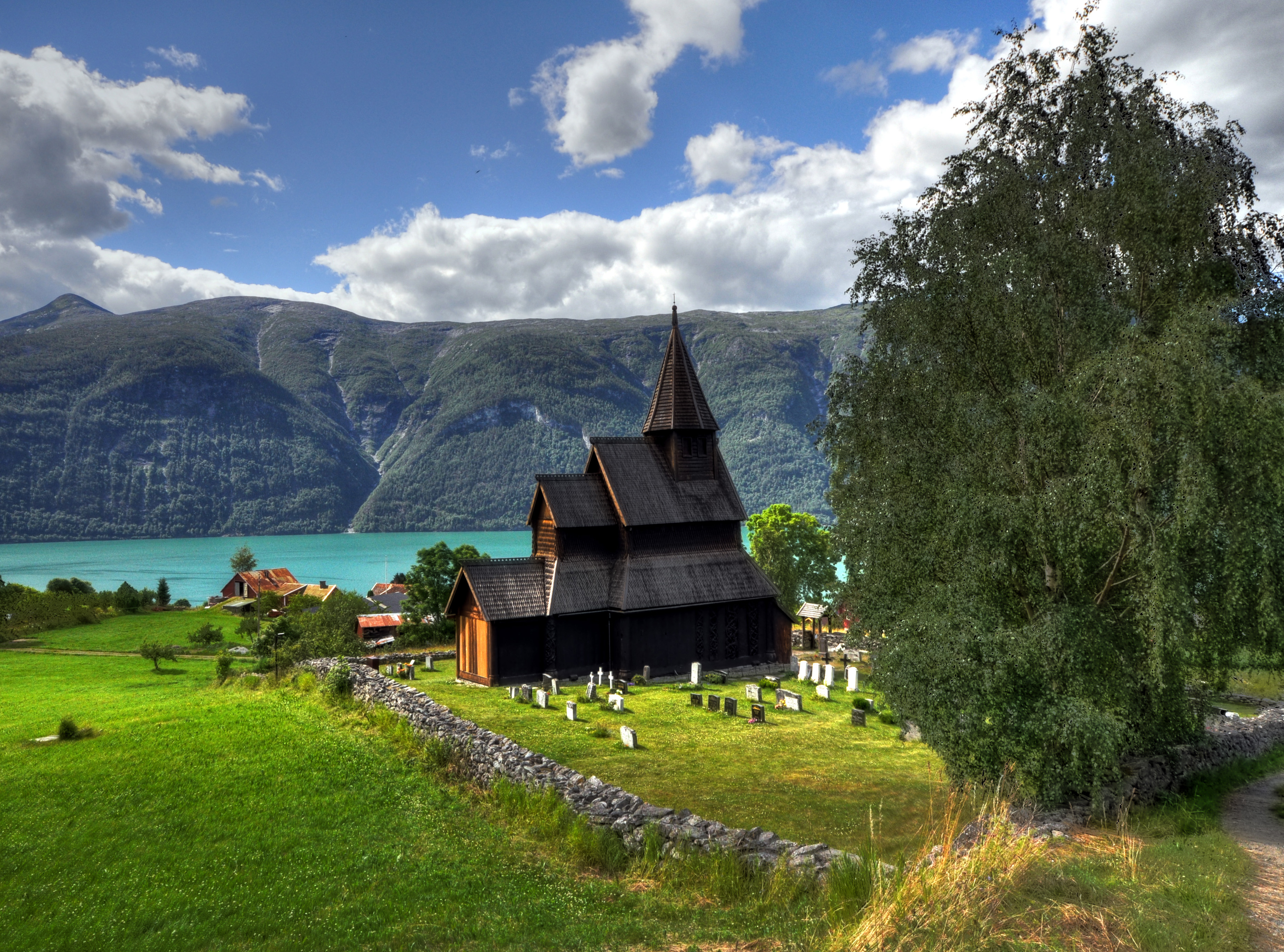
Urnes Stave Church (12th century), World Heritage Site

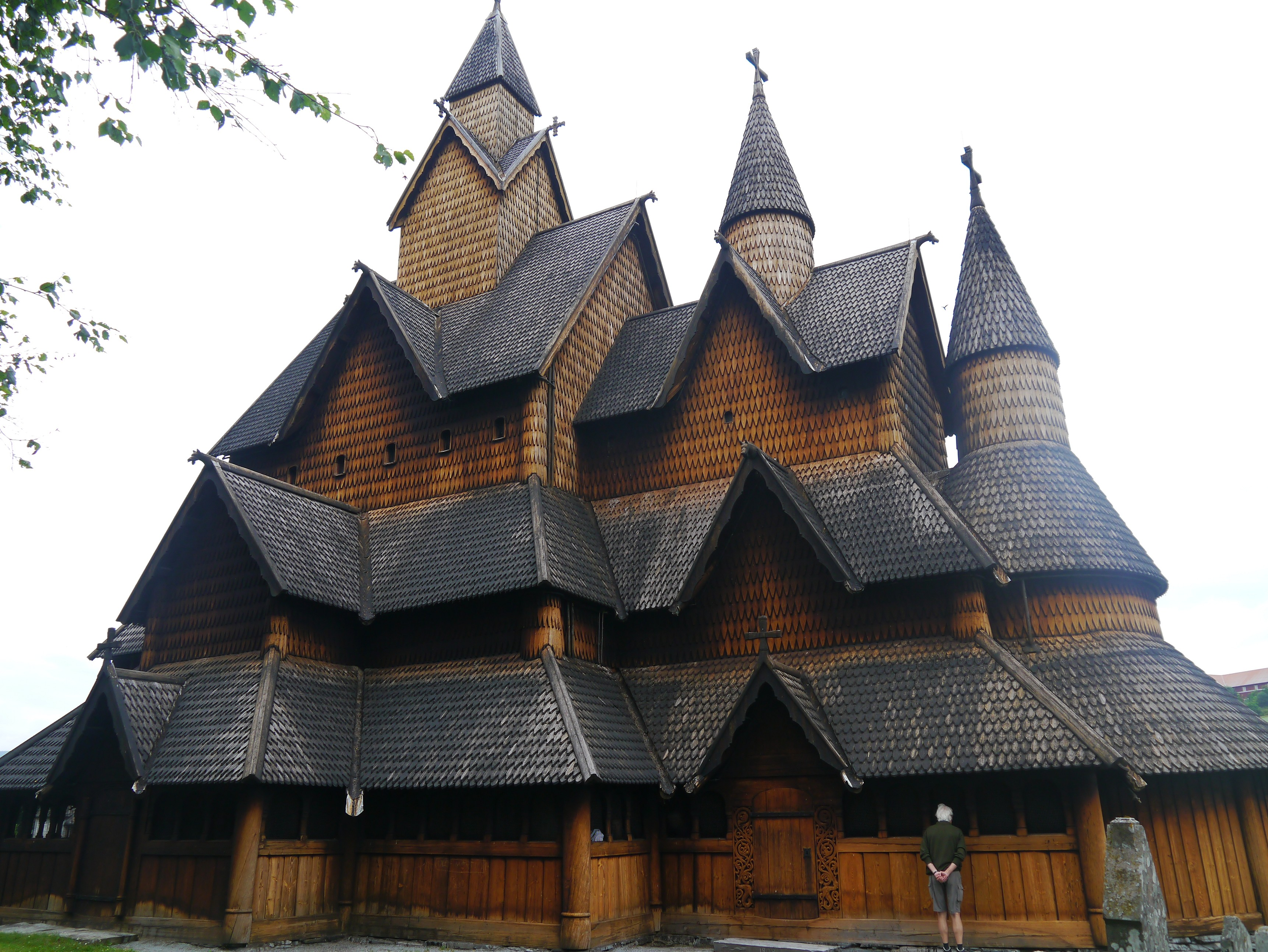
Heddal Stave Church, largest stave church (13th century)

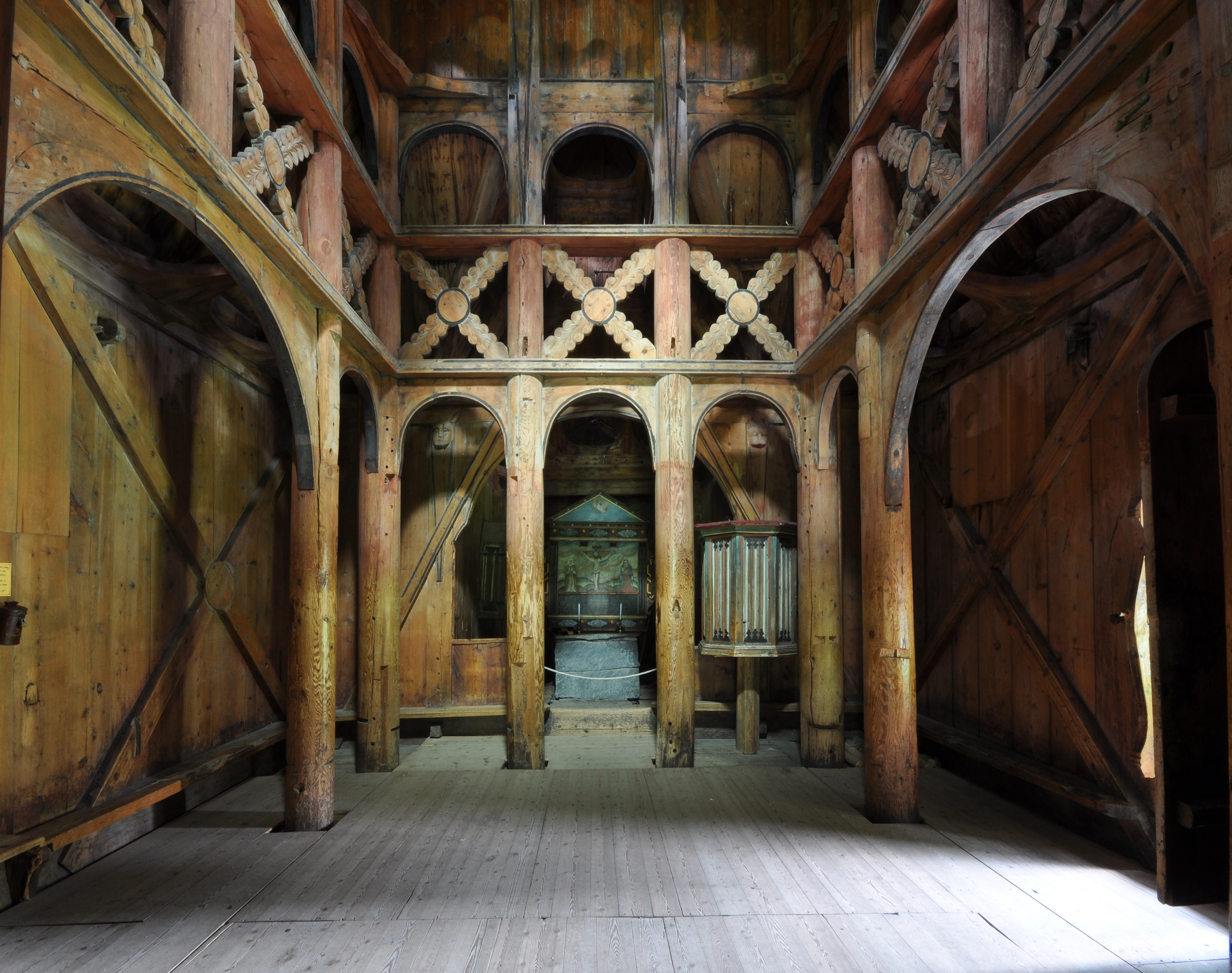
Borgund Stave Church, interior (12th century)

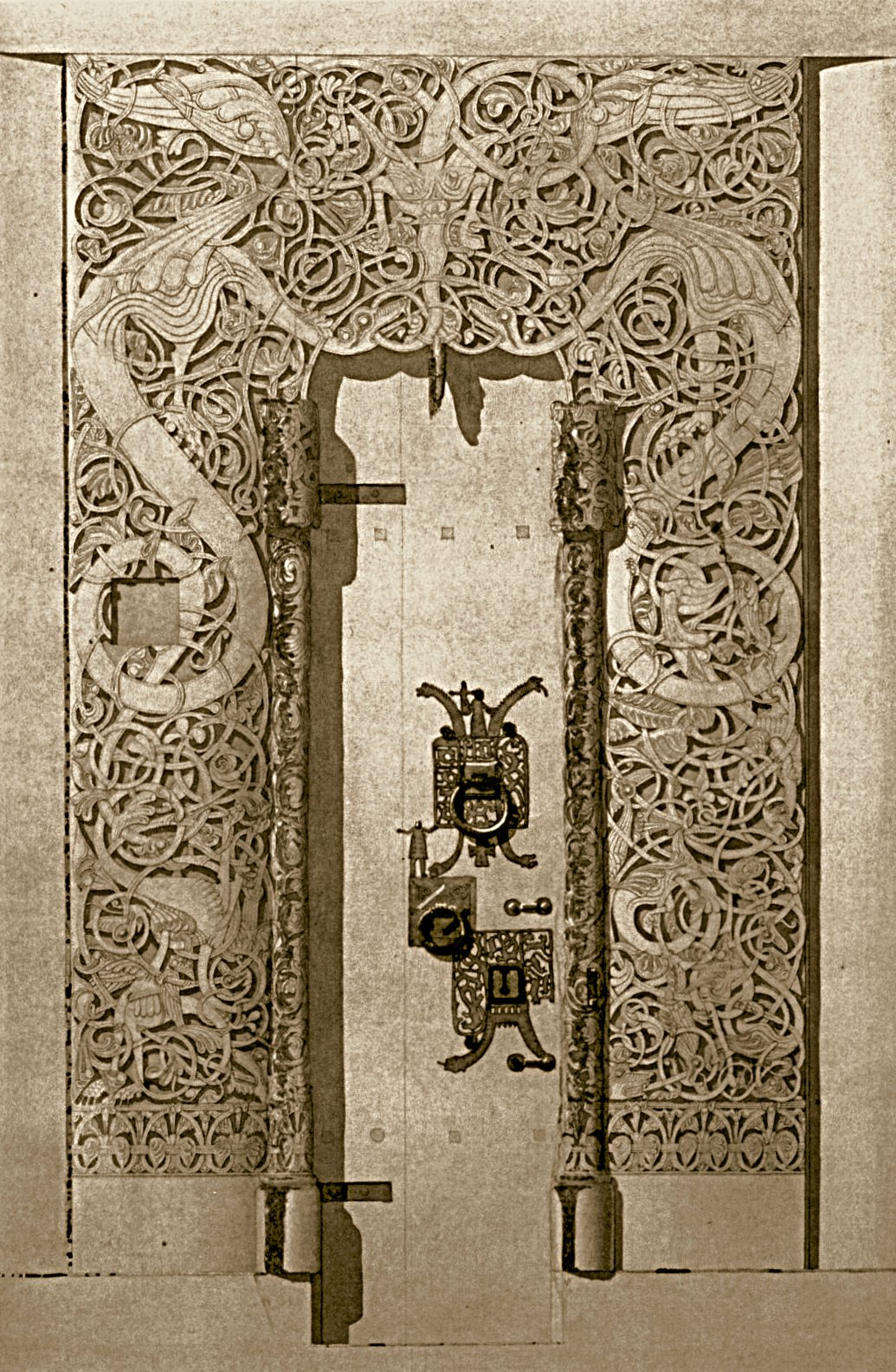
Wood carving, Hedal Stave Church (12th century)

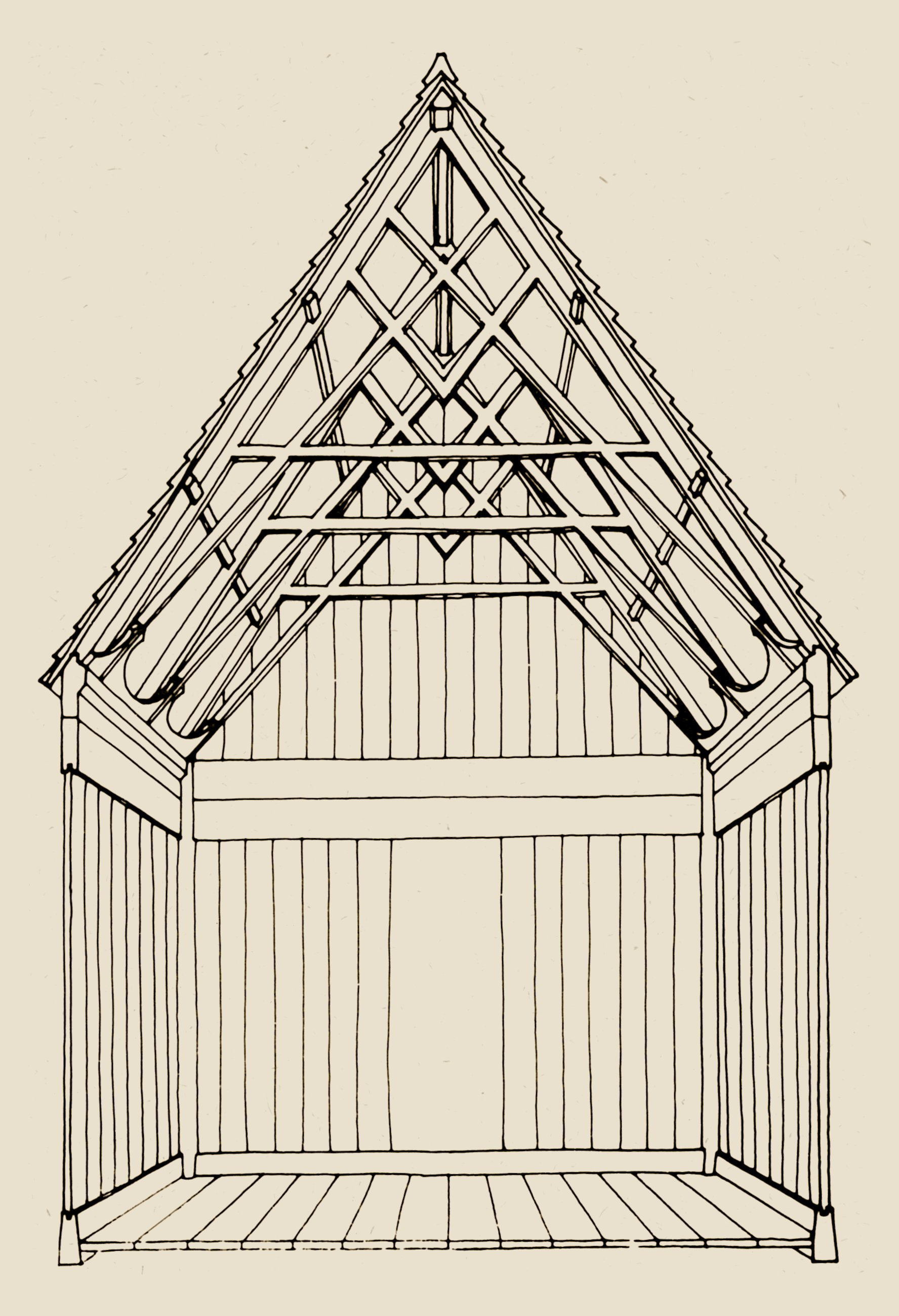
Haltdalen Stave Church drawing by Christie.

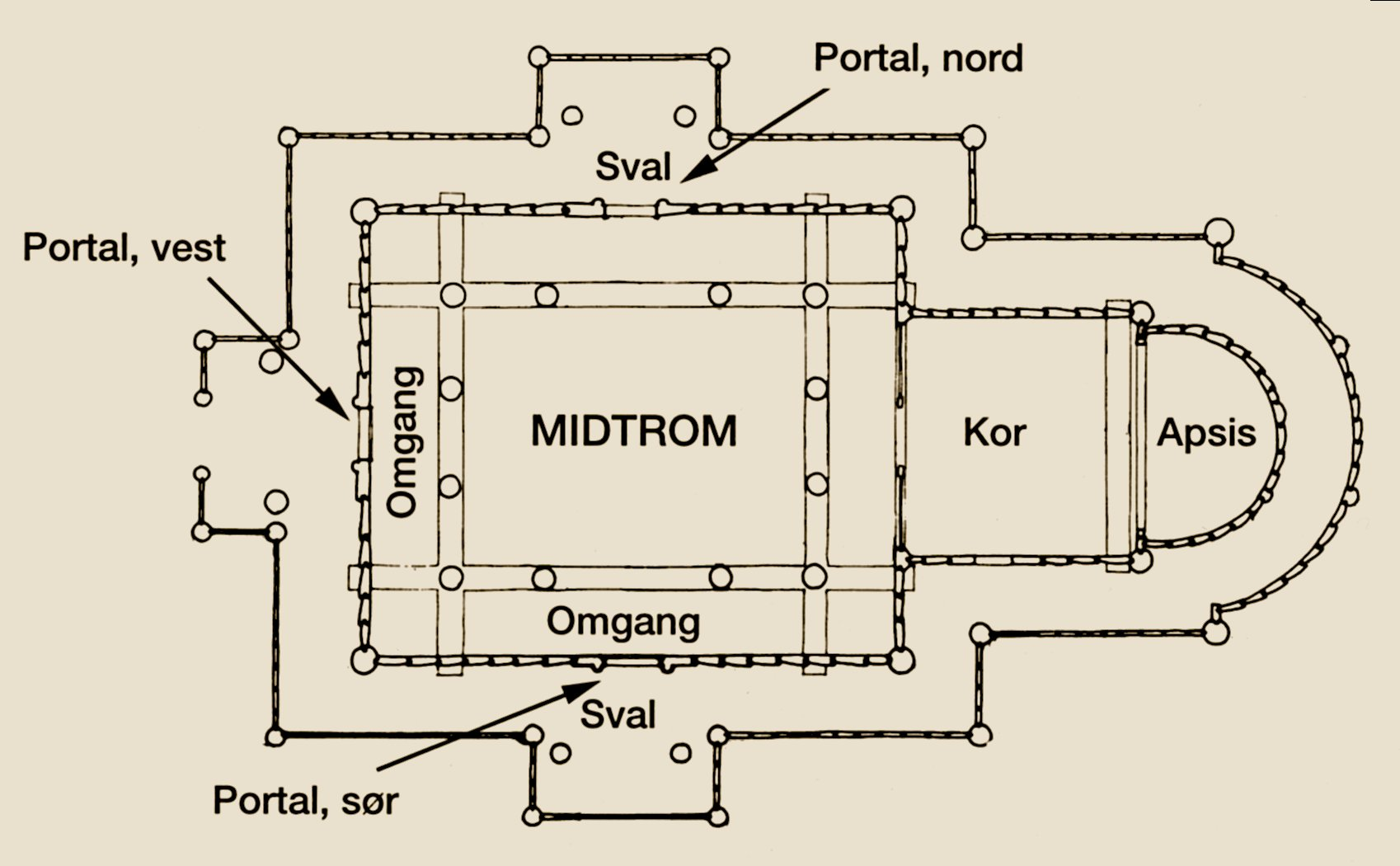
Floor plan of stave church, by Christie,

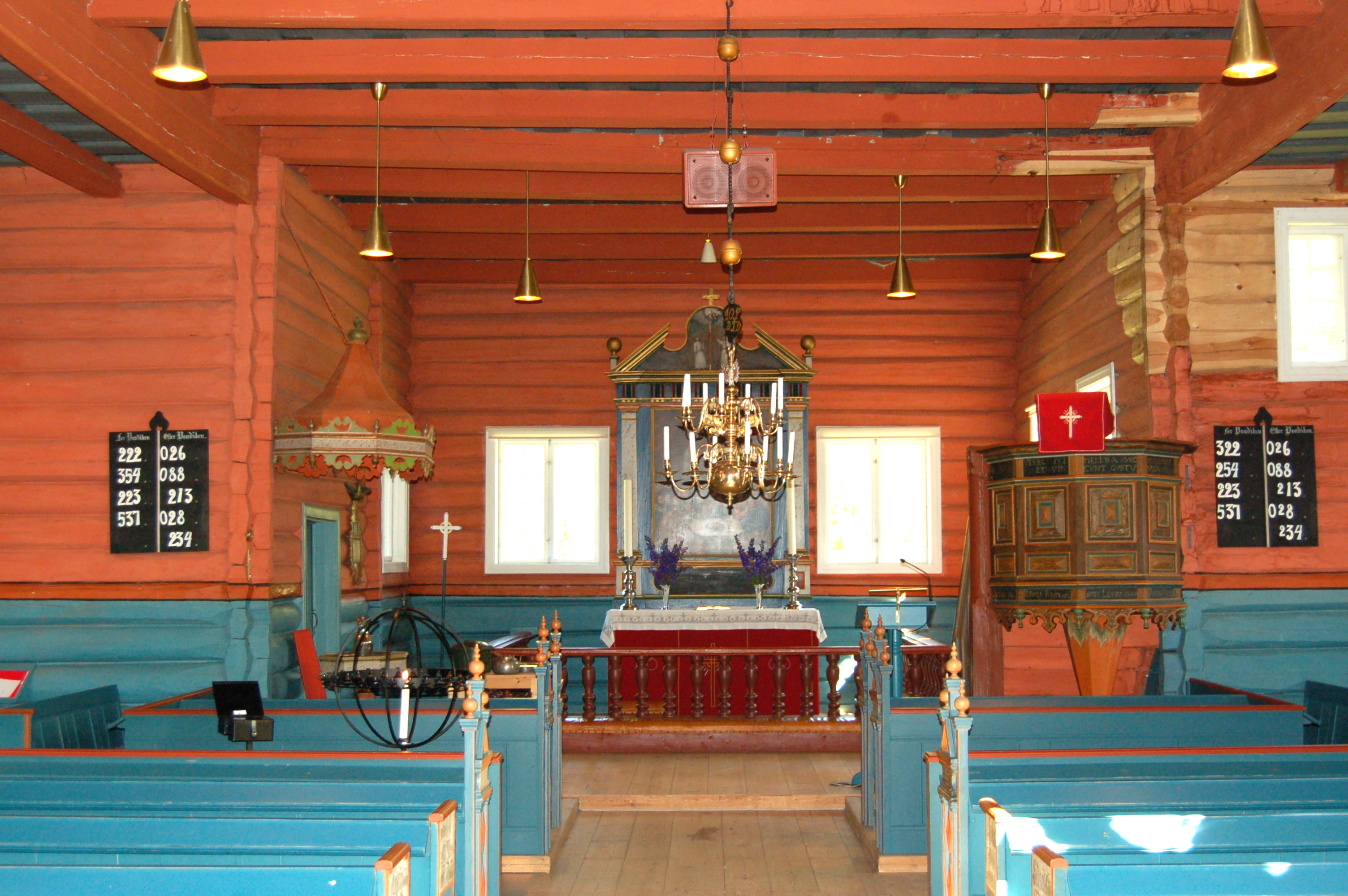
Flesberg Stave Church (12th century), interior log building enlargement to cruciform (1735)

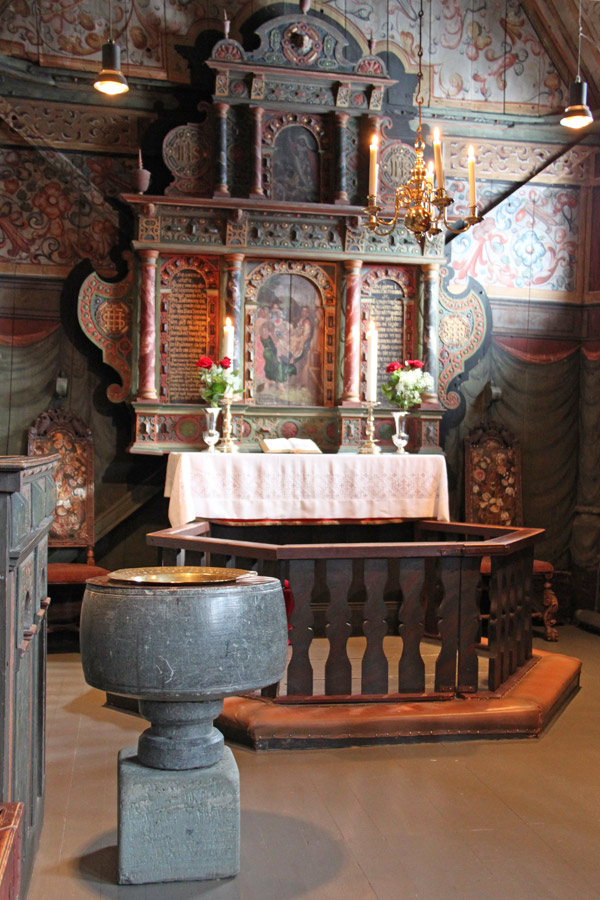
Baptismal font (soapstone) and altar, Røldal Stave Church

Medieval stone churches
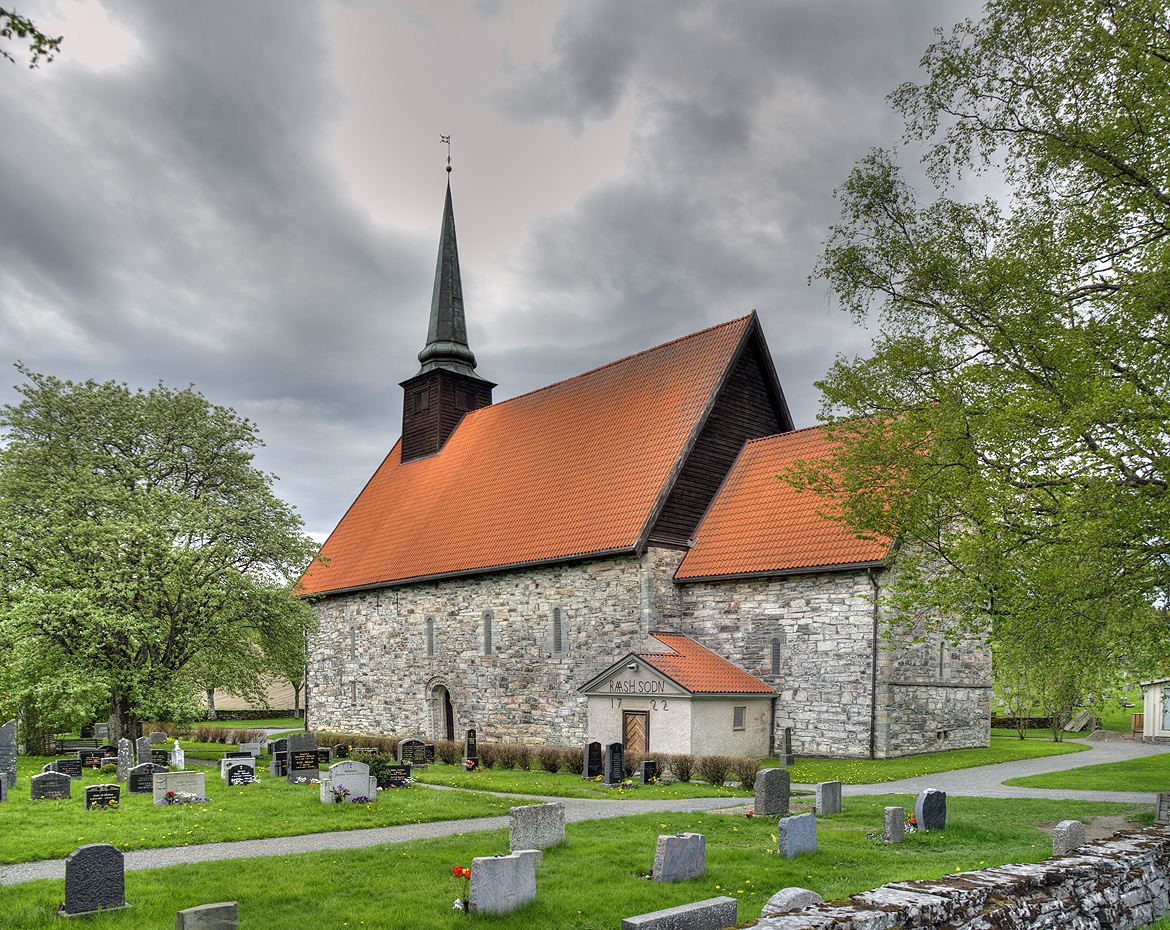
Stiklestad Church, site of Battle of Stiklestad, long romanesque

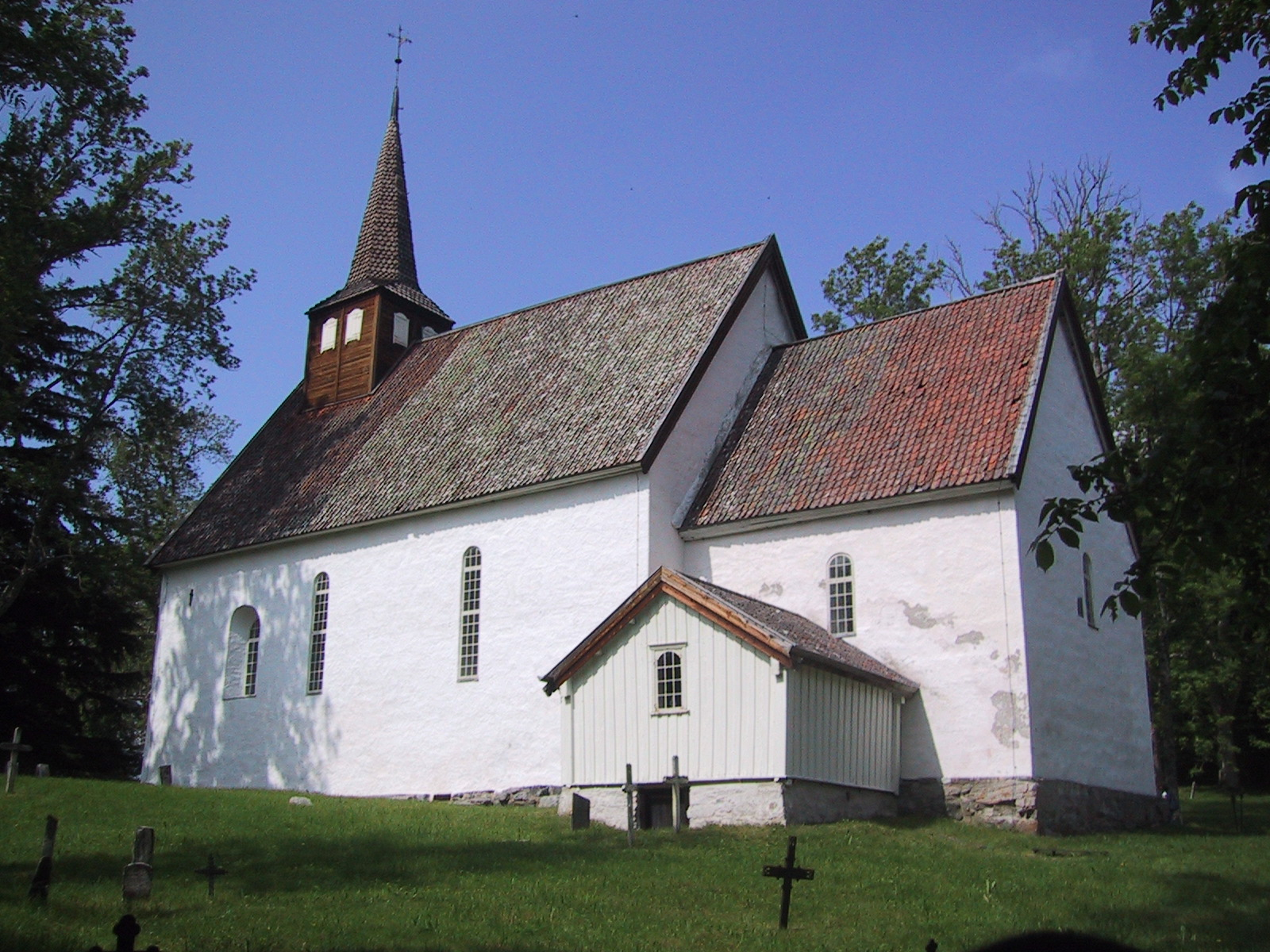
Old Veøy Church, romanesque long church, masonry (12th century)

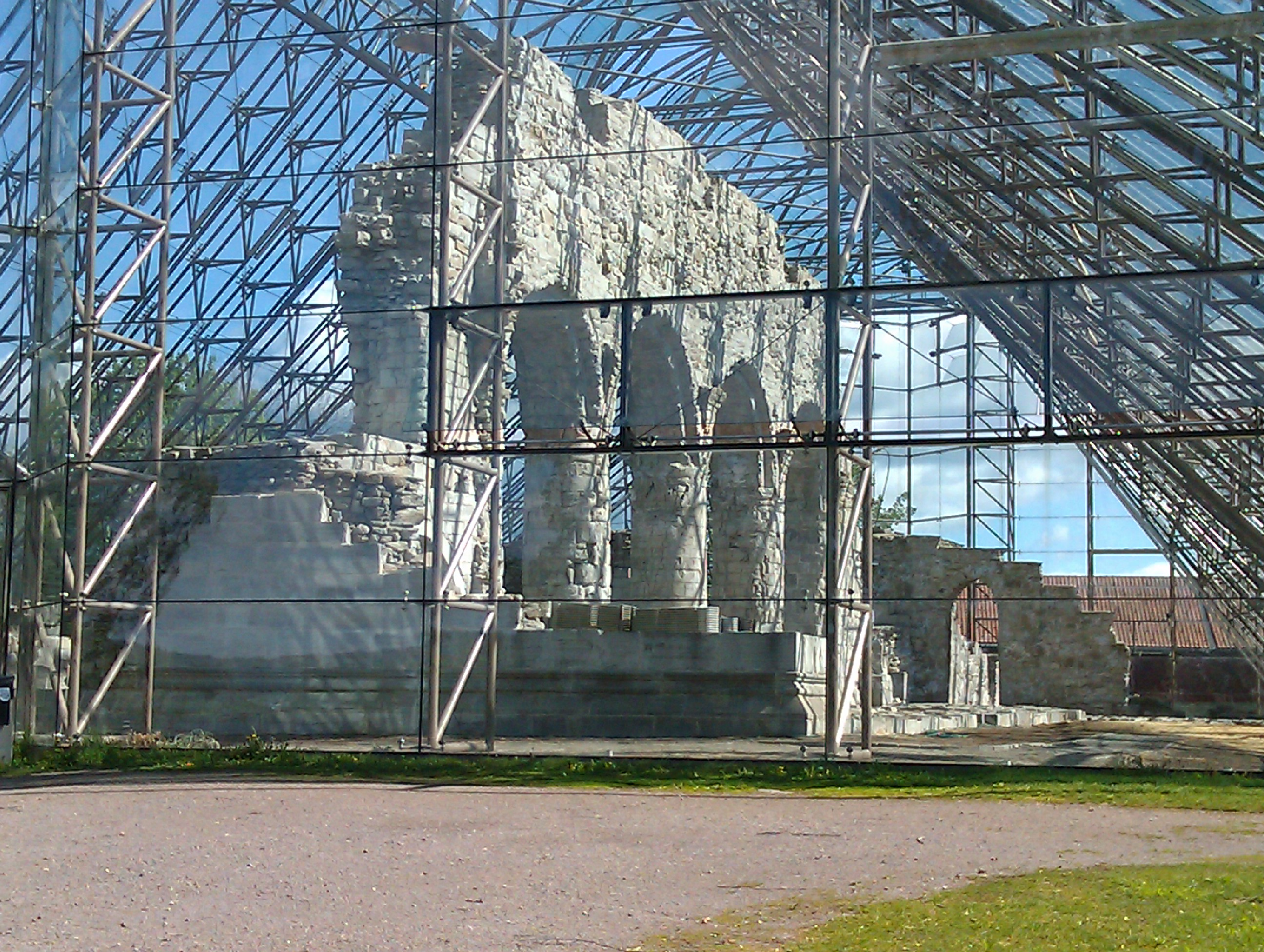
Cathedral Ruins in Hamar (about 1152), under protection

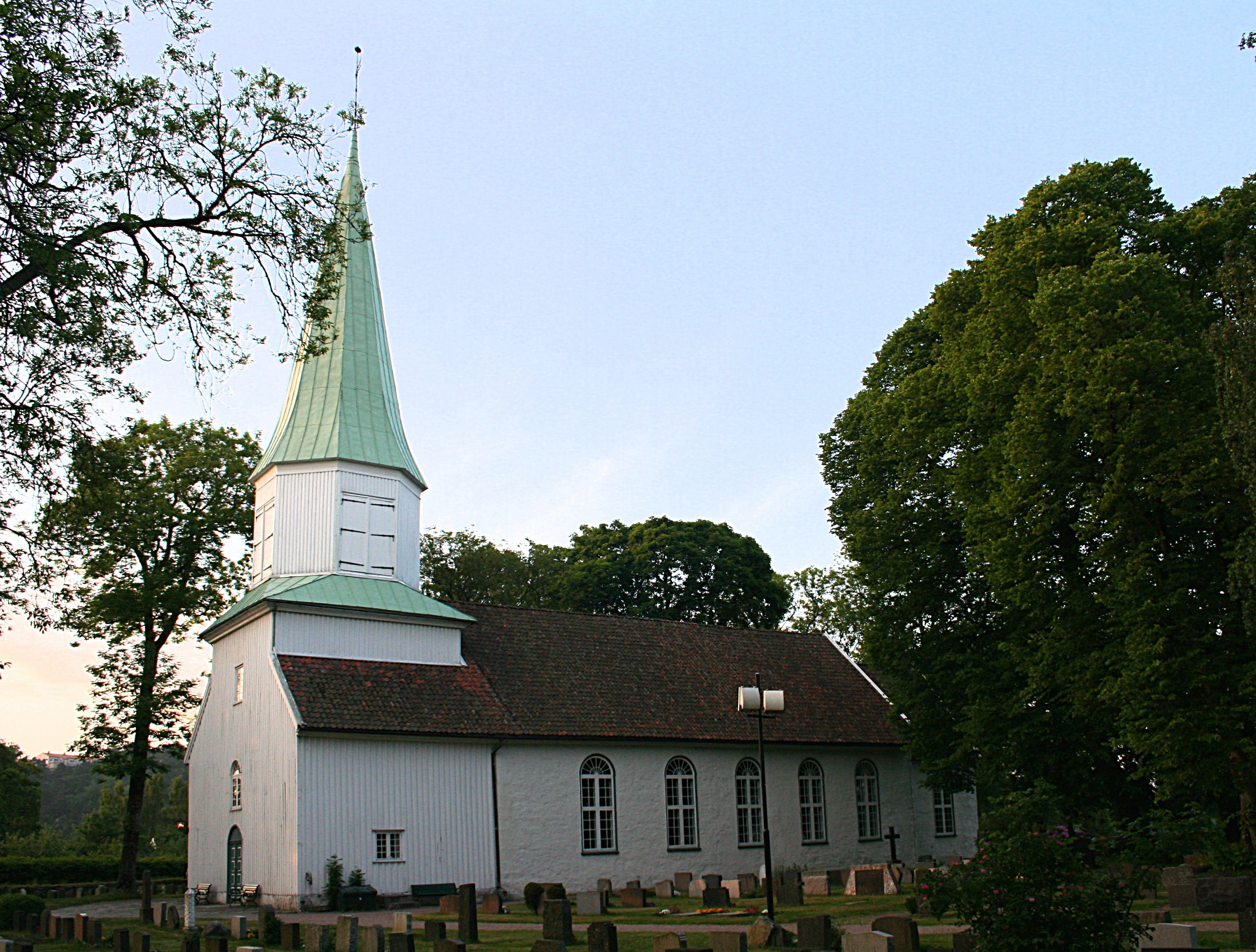
Oddernes Church, Kristiansand (11th century)

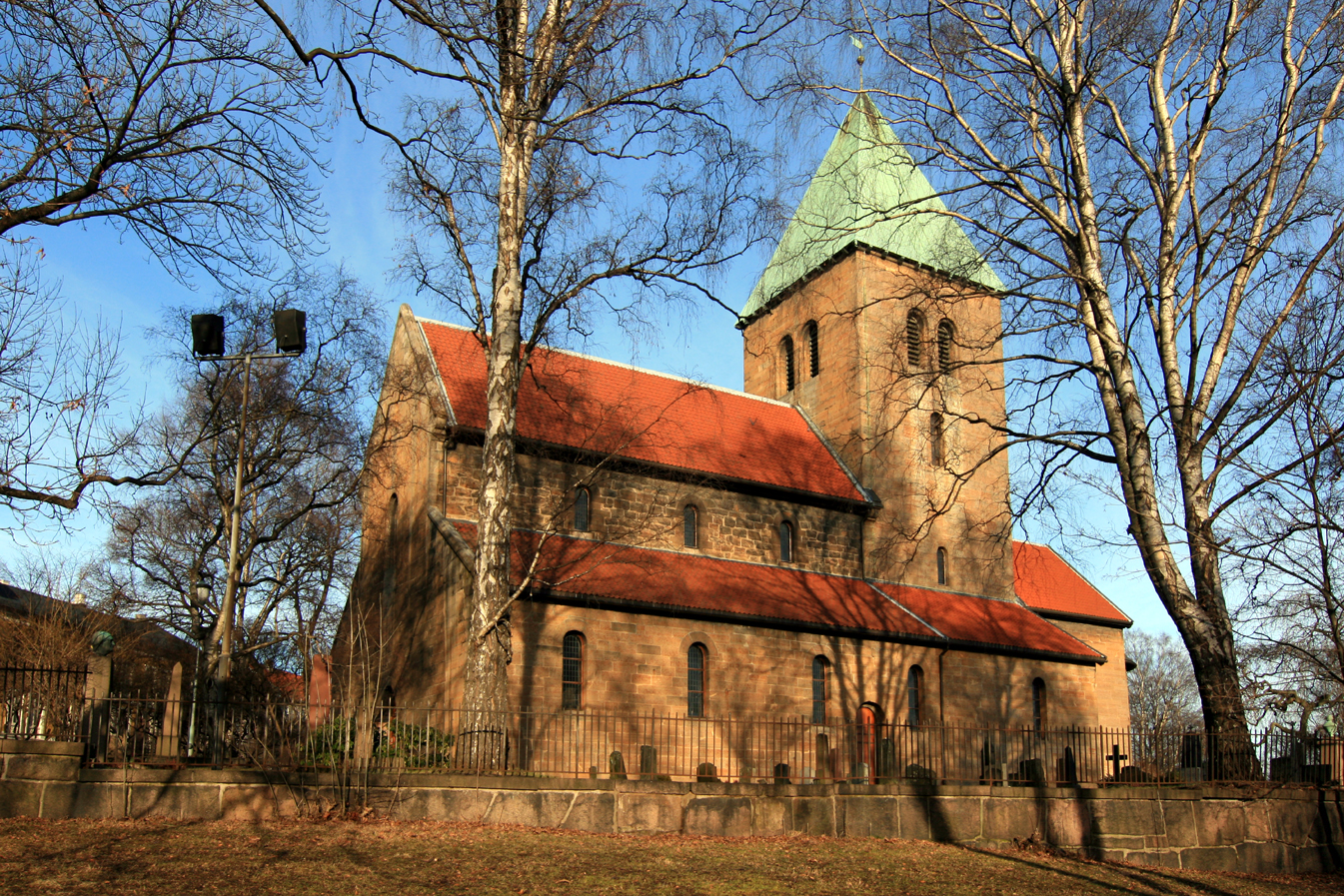
Old Aker Church, Oslo (11th century)

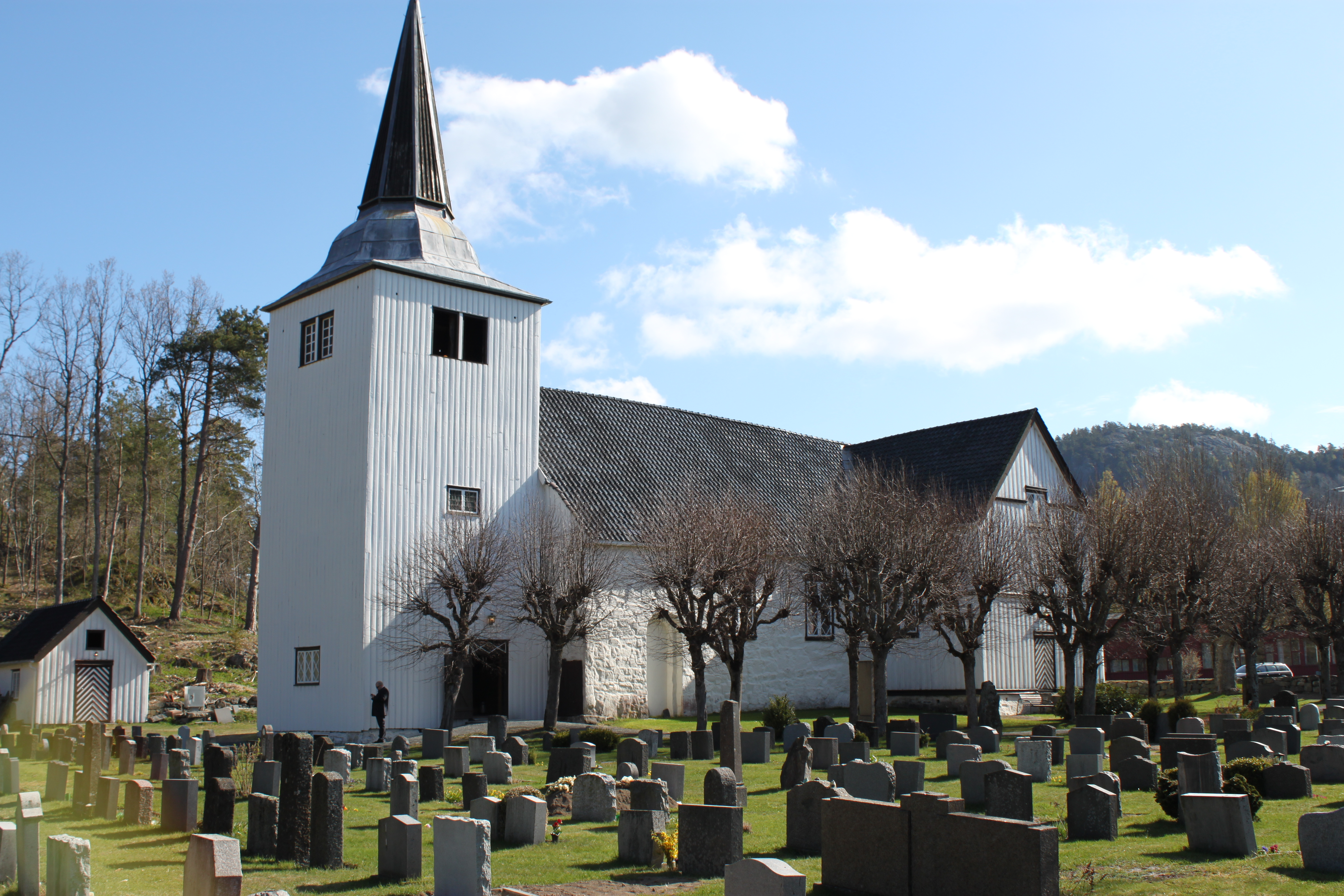
Søndeled Church, stone (about 1150), wood enlargement to cruciform (1785)

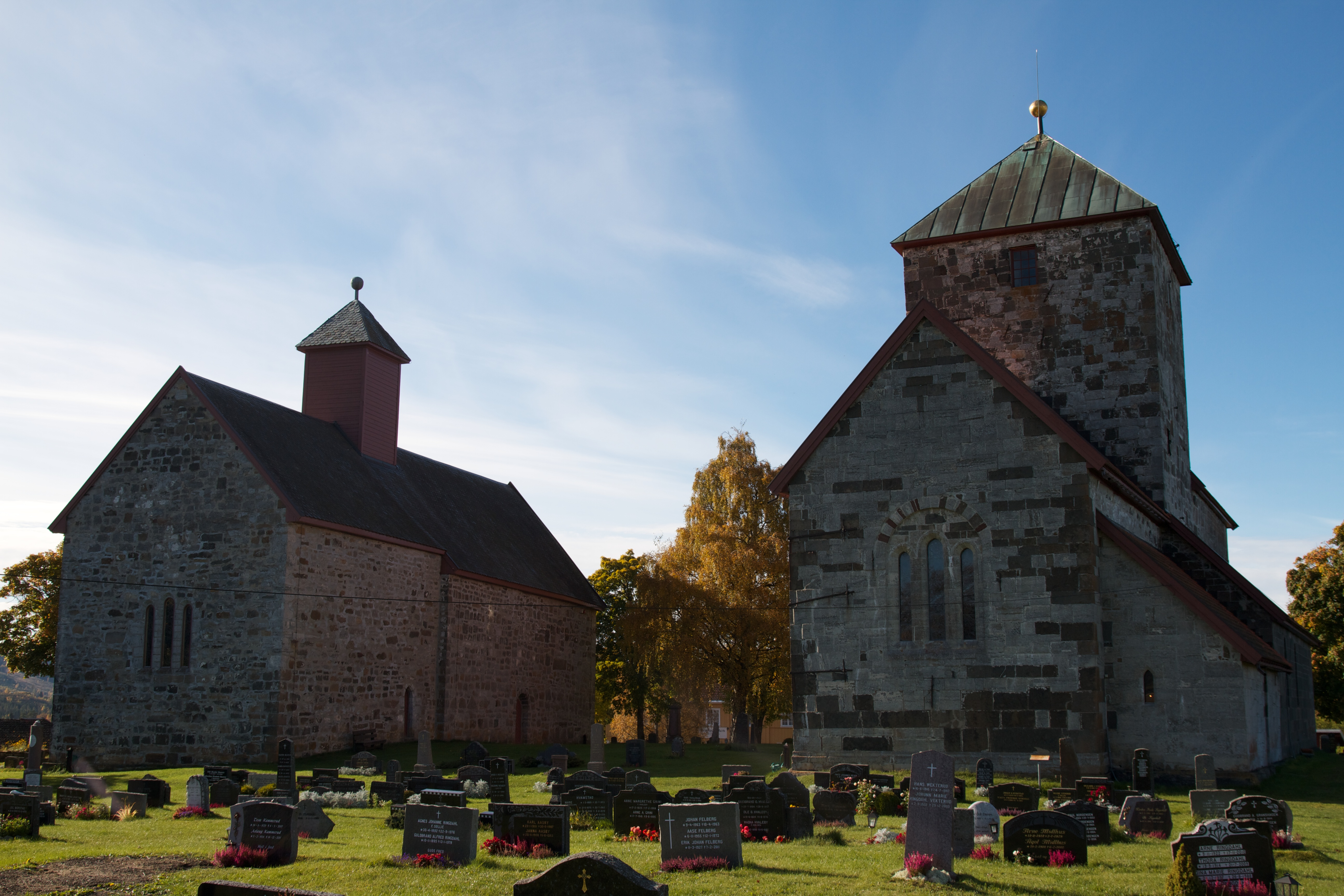
Sister Churches at Gran, romanesque and gothic, one long church, one basilica (12th century).

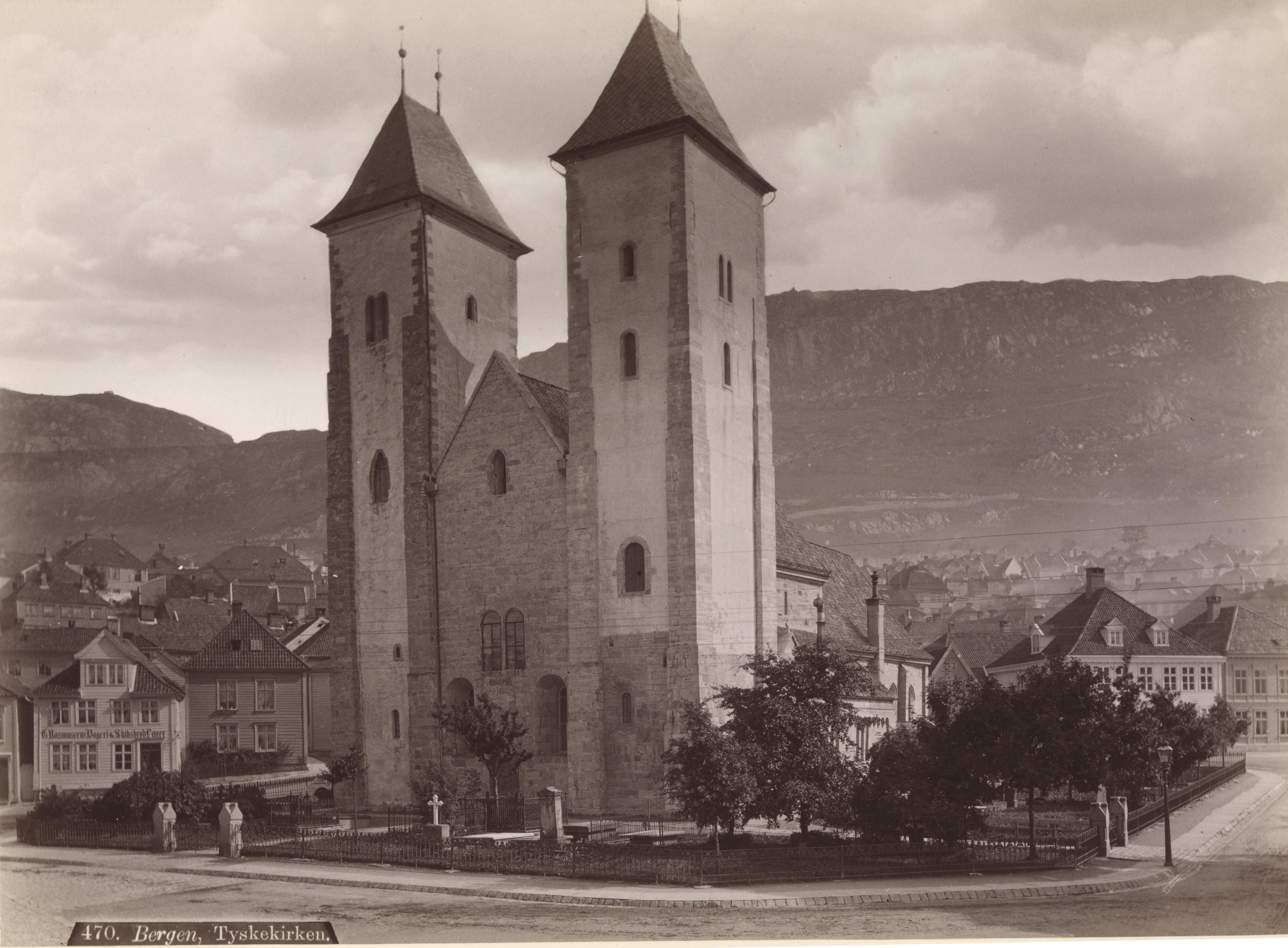
Mariakirken (St Mary's) or German church, Bergen, basilica, romanesque and gothic (12th century)

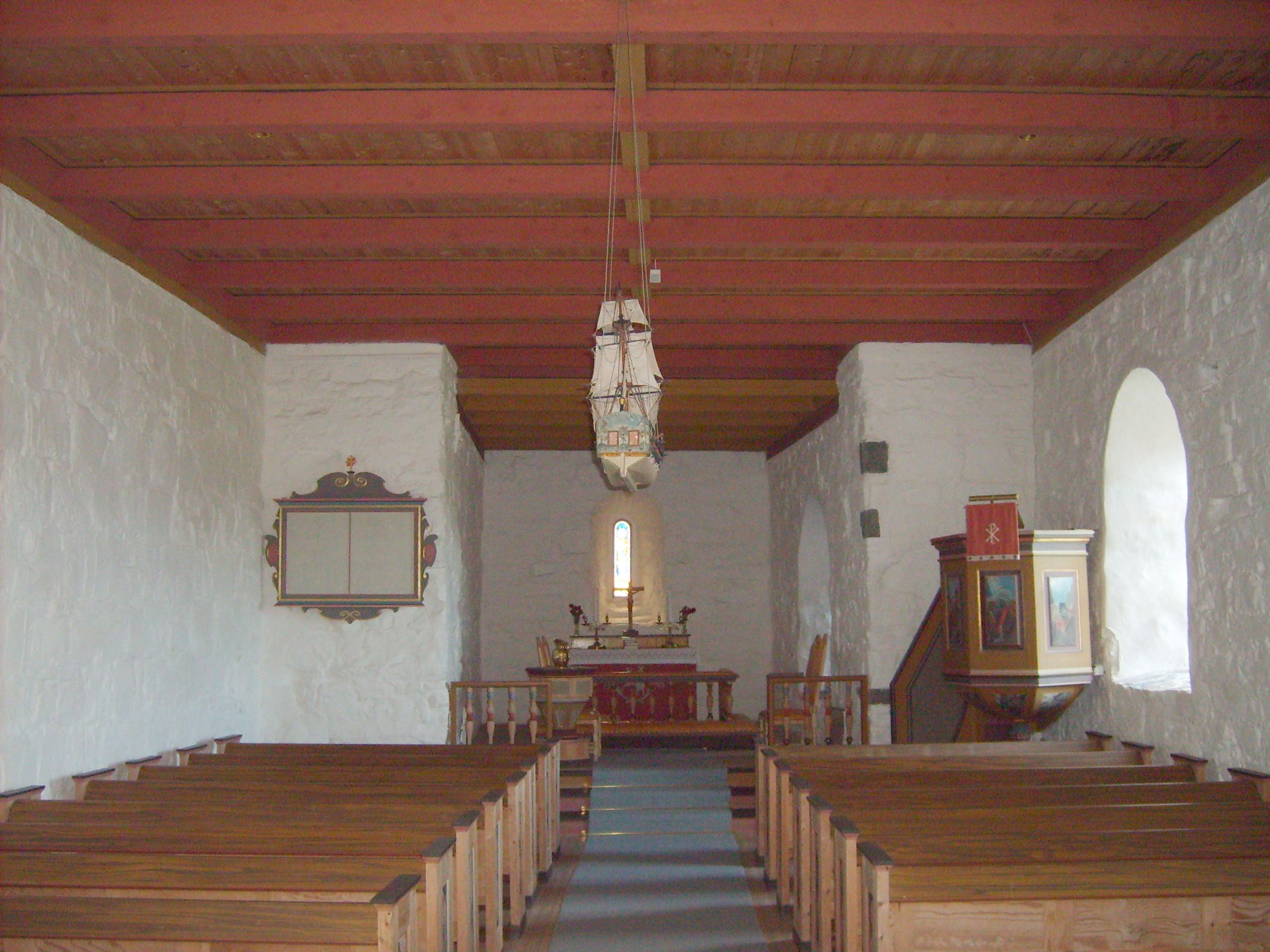
Interior of Old Edøy Church, masonry long church (12th century)

=== Post-reformation ===
Church building 1536–1851
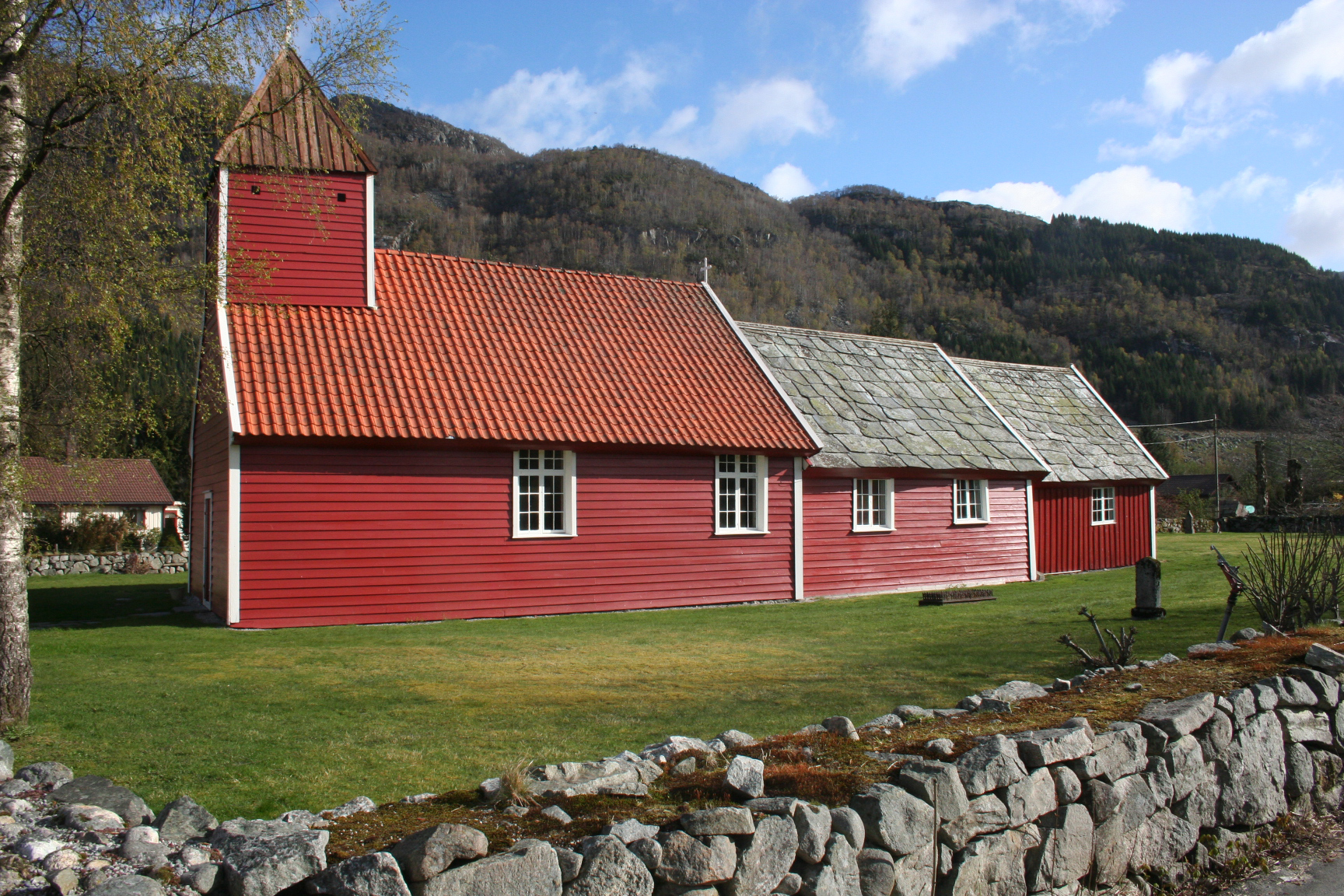
Old Årdal Church (Hjelmeland Municipality), long church, log construction, Stavanger renaissance (1620)

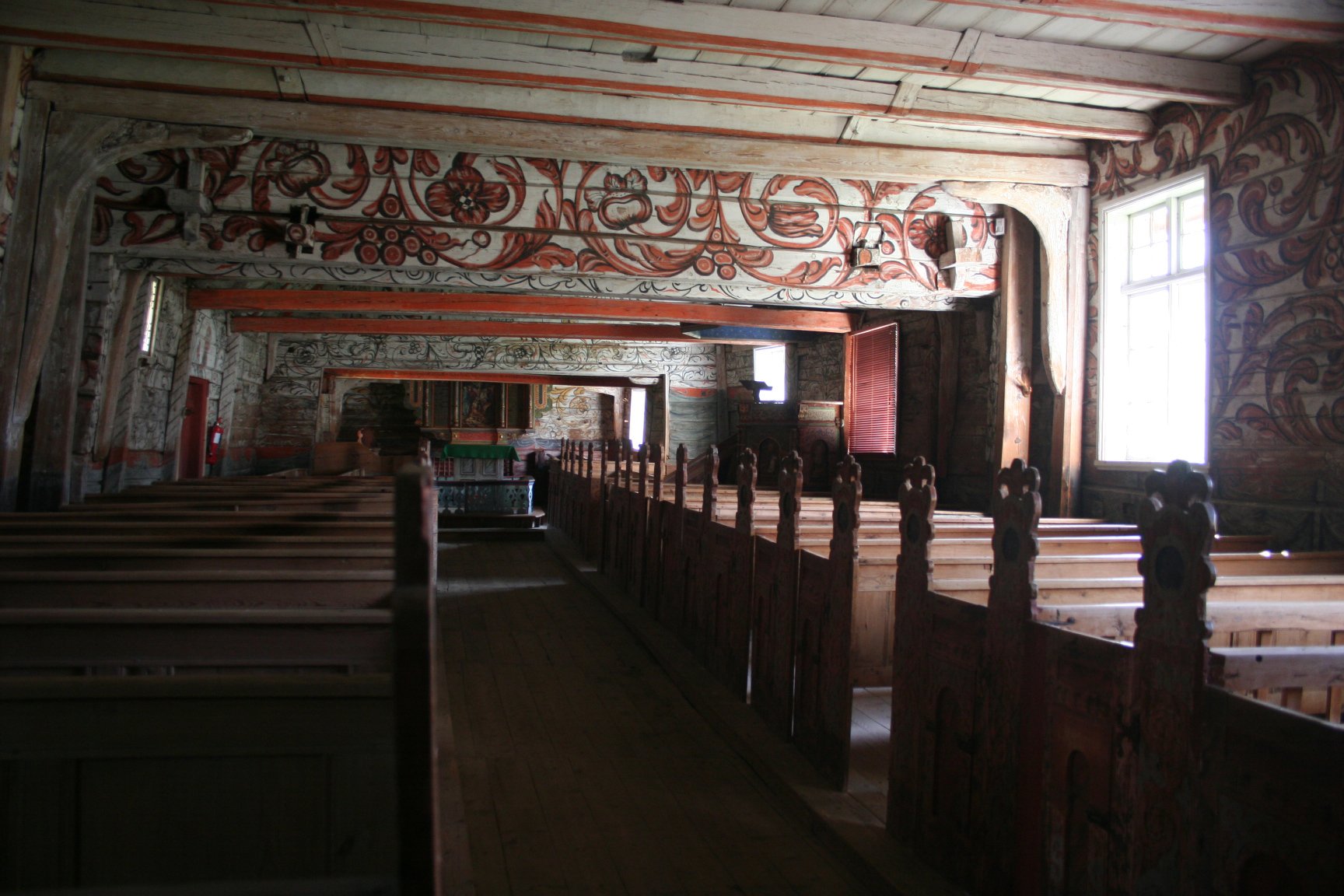
Old Årdal Church, tole painted interior

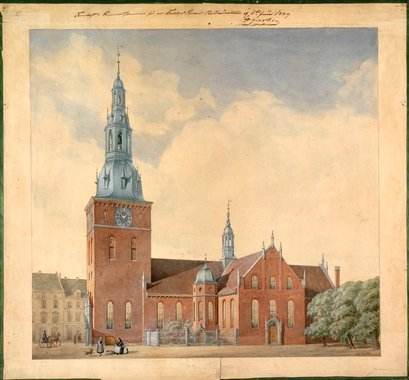
Oslo Cathedral, baroque, cruciform, brick (1697), watercolors

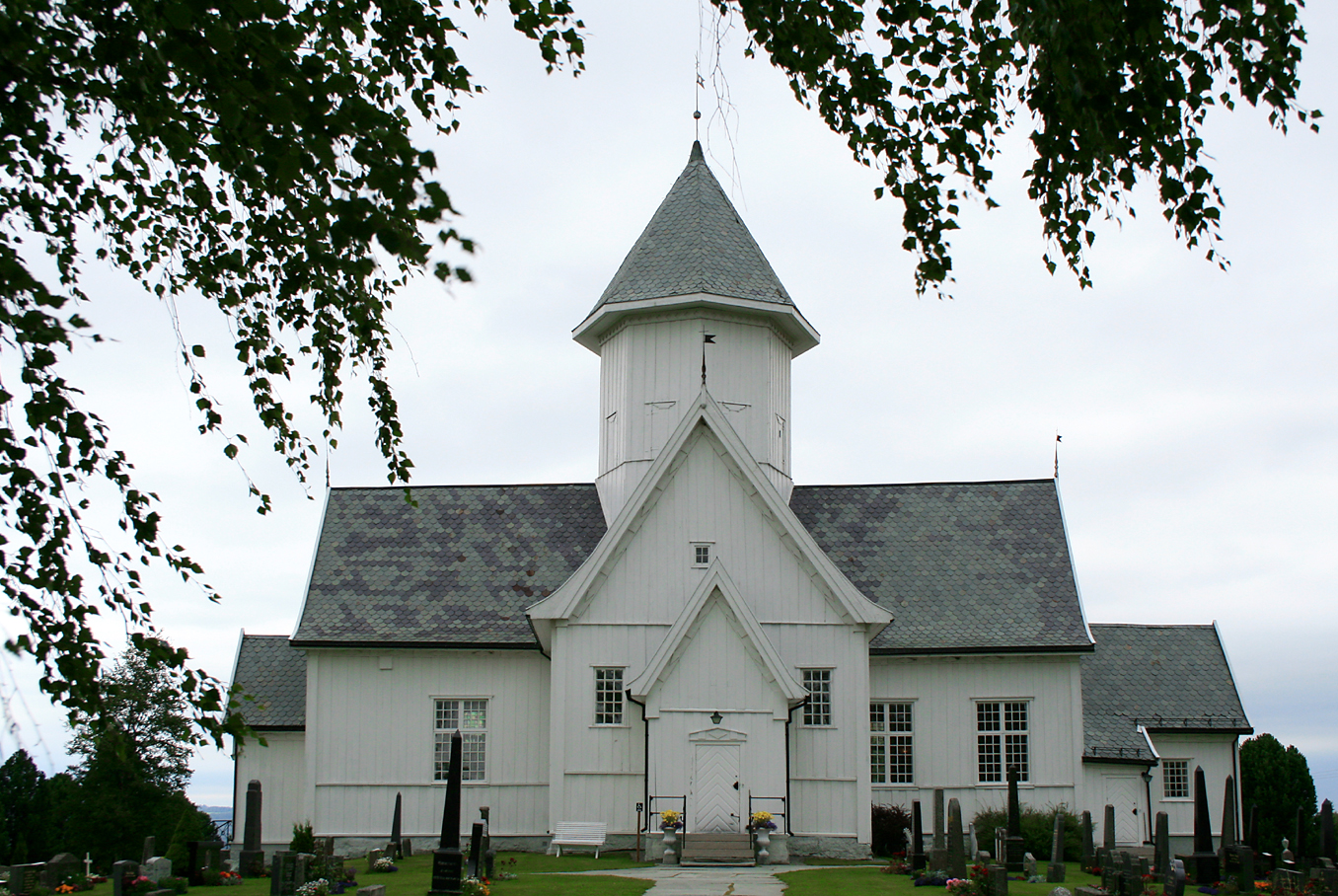
Kolbu church, cruciform, wood (1730)

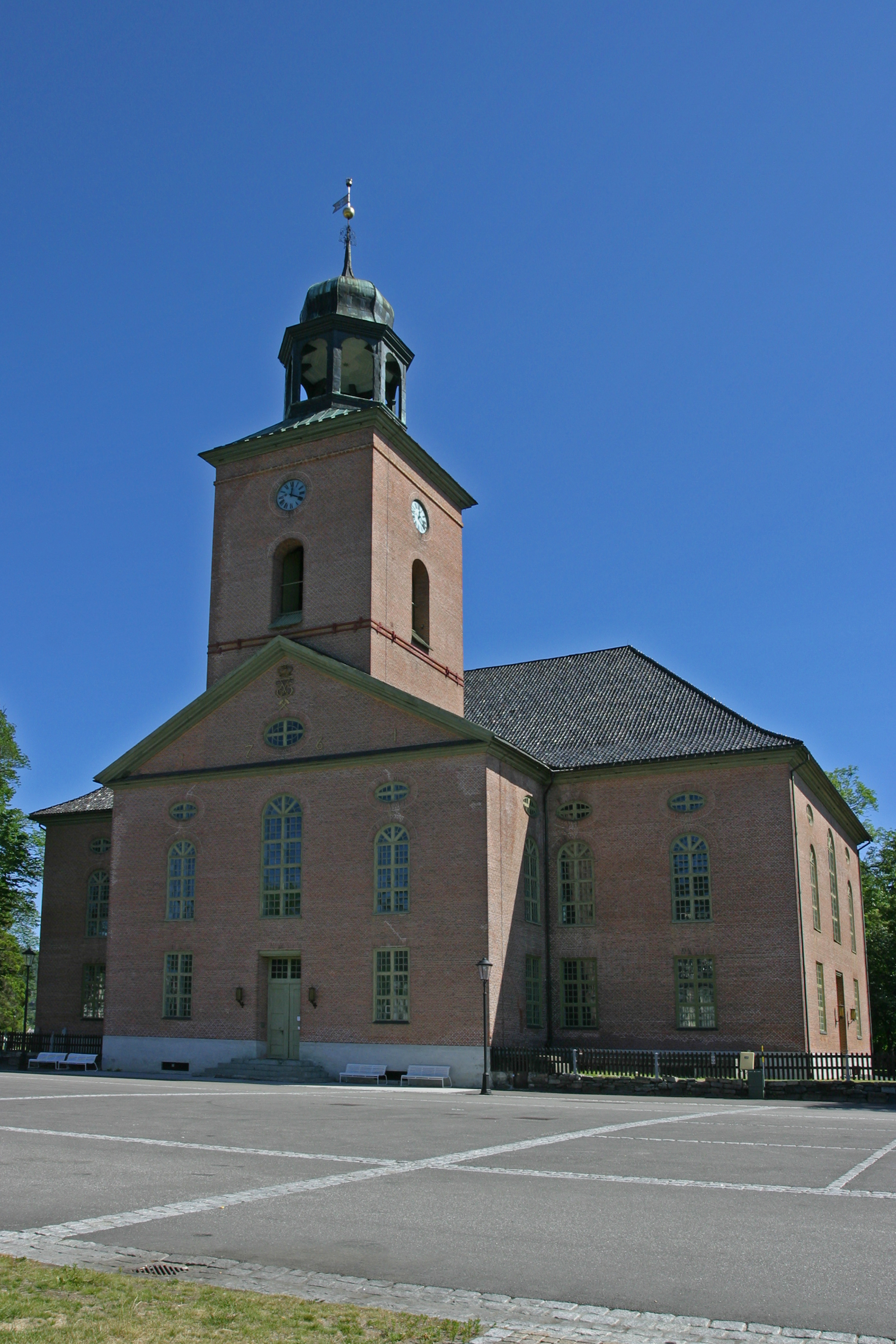
Kongsberg Church, barque, Norway's largest, brick, cruciform

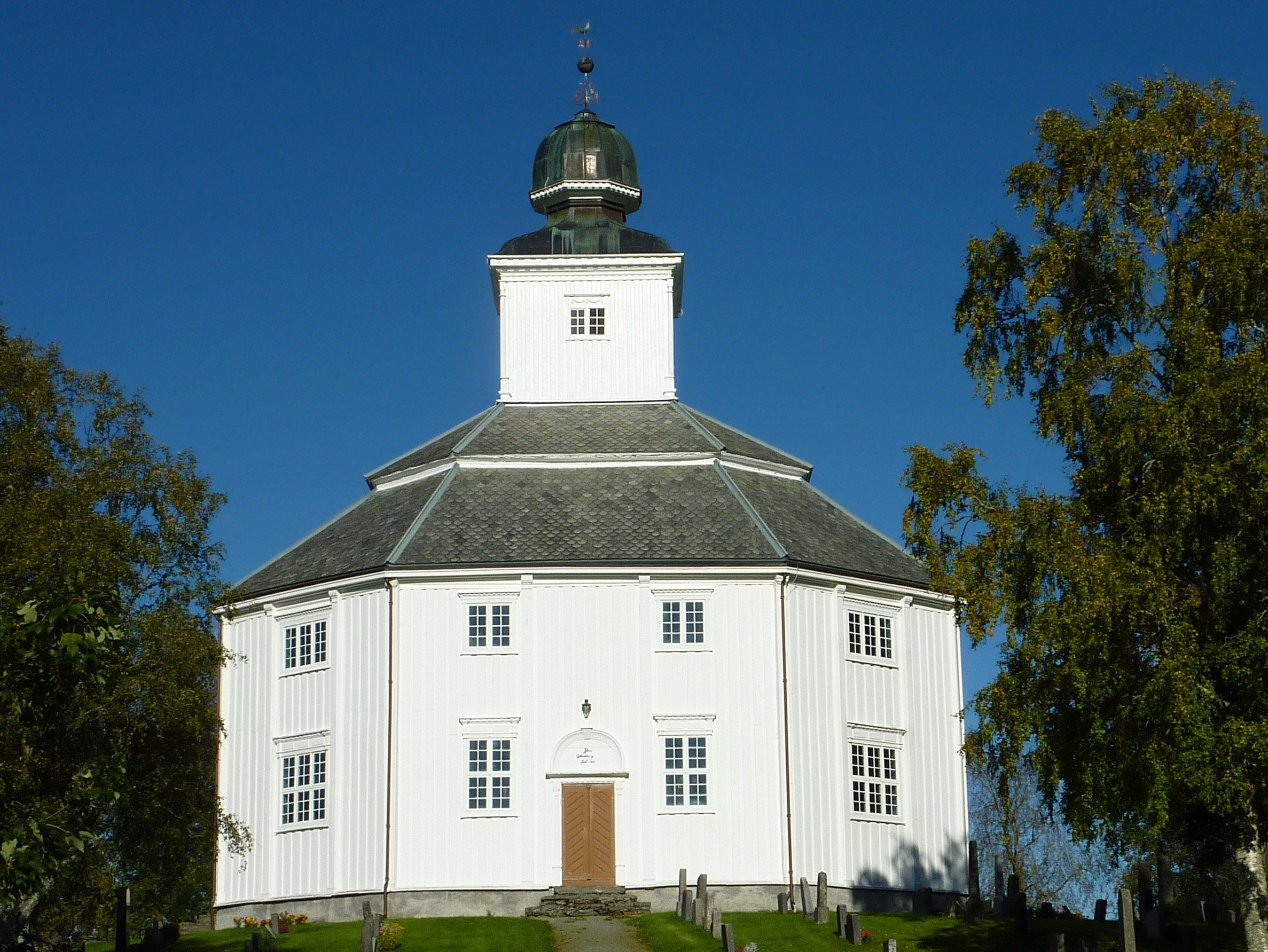
Klæbu Church, octagonal (1790)

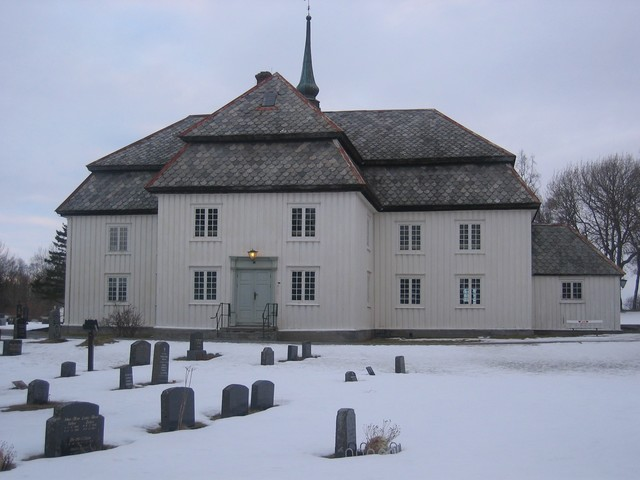
Evenes Church, wood, Danish "manor style" (1800)

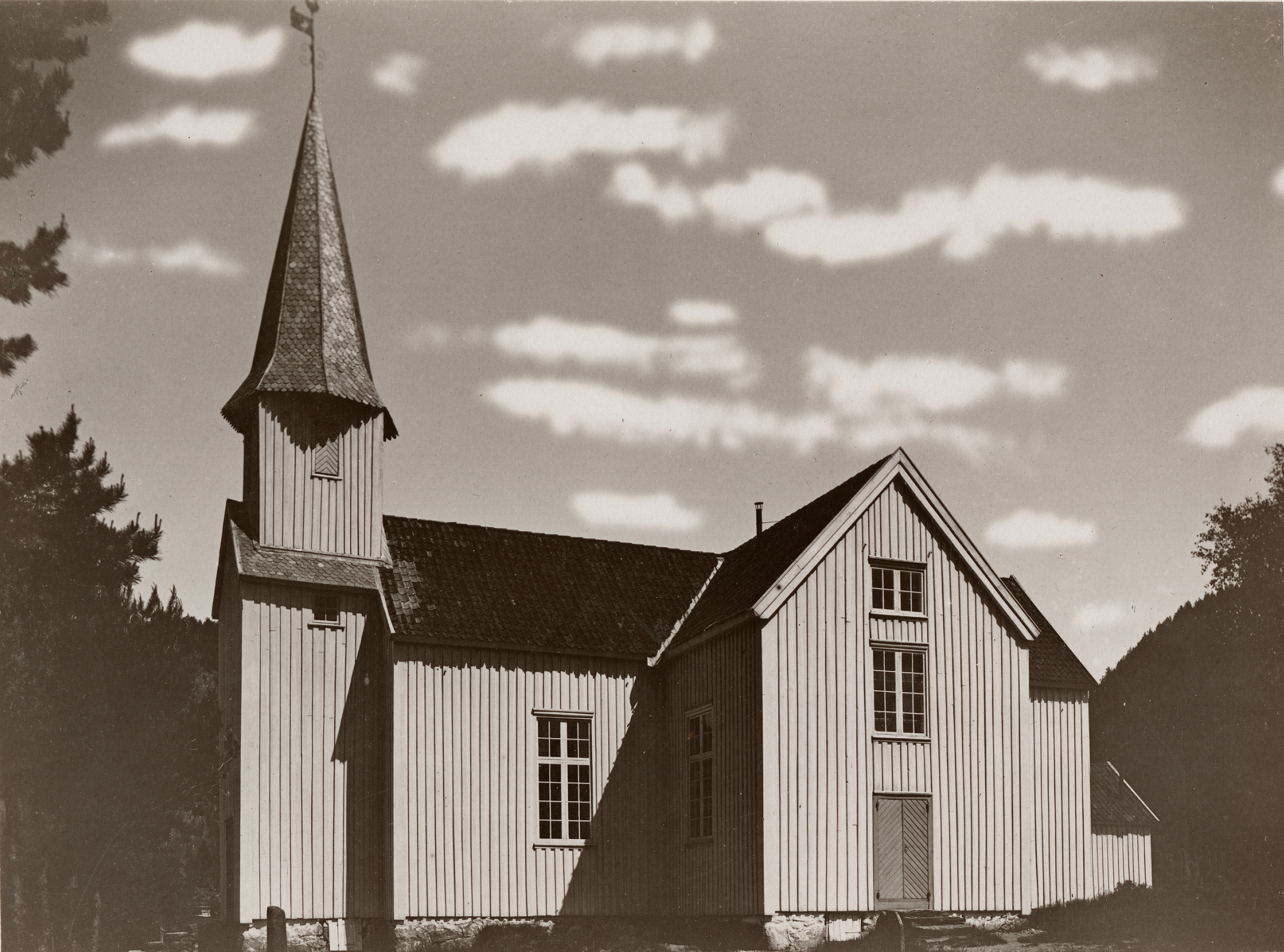
Laudal Church, wood (1826), photo by Thomhav (1900)/Riksantikvaren

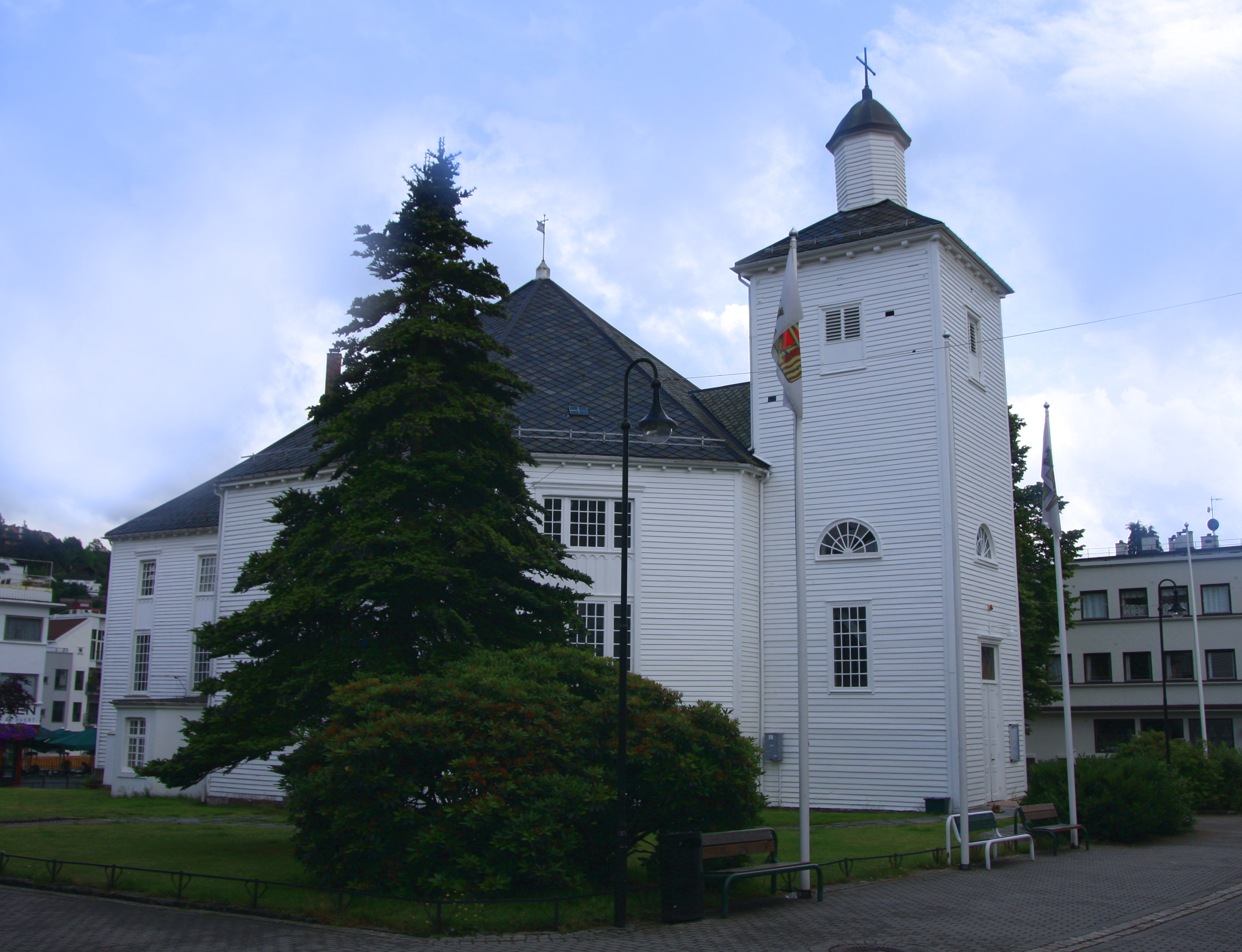
Flekkefjord Church, wood, partly octagonal, separate church tower (1833)

After 1851 church act
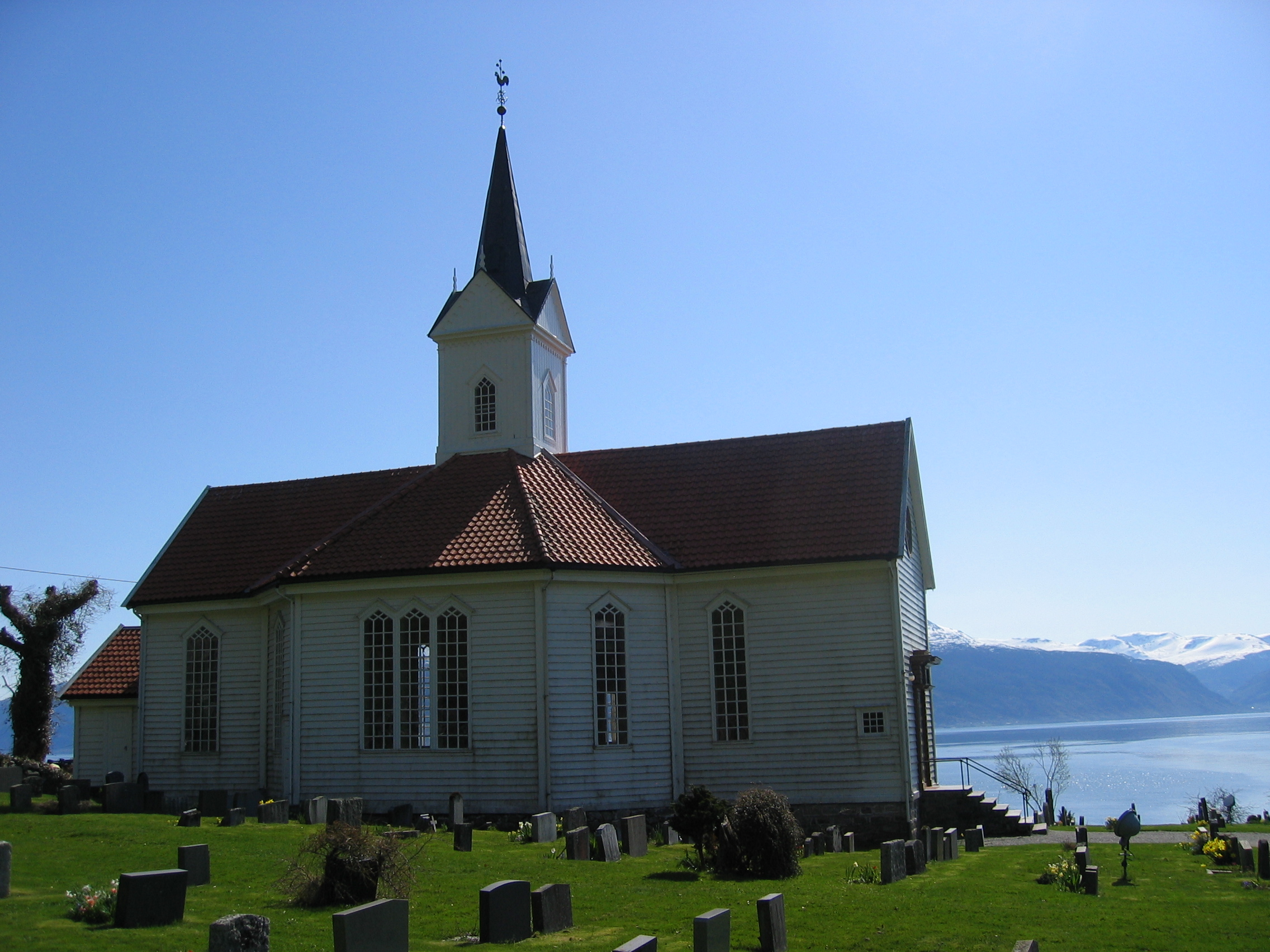
Tjugum Church, partly octagonal, wood (1863)

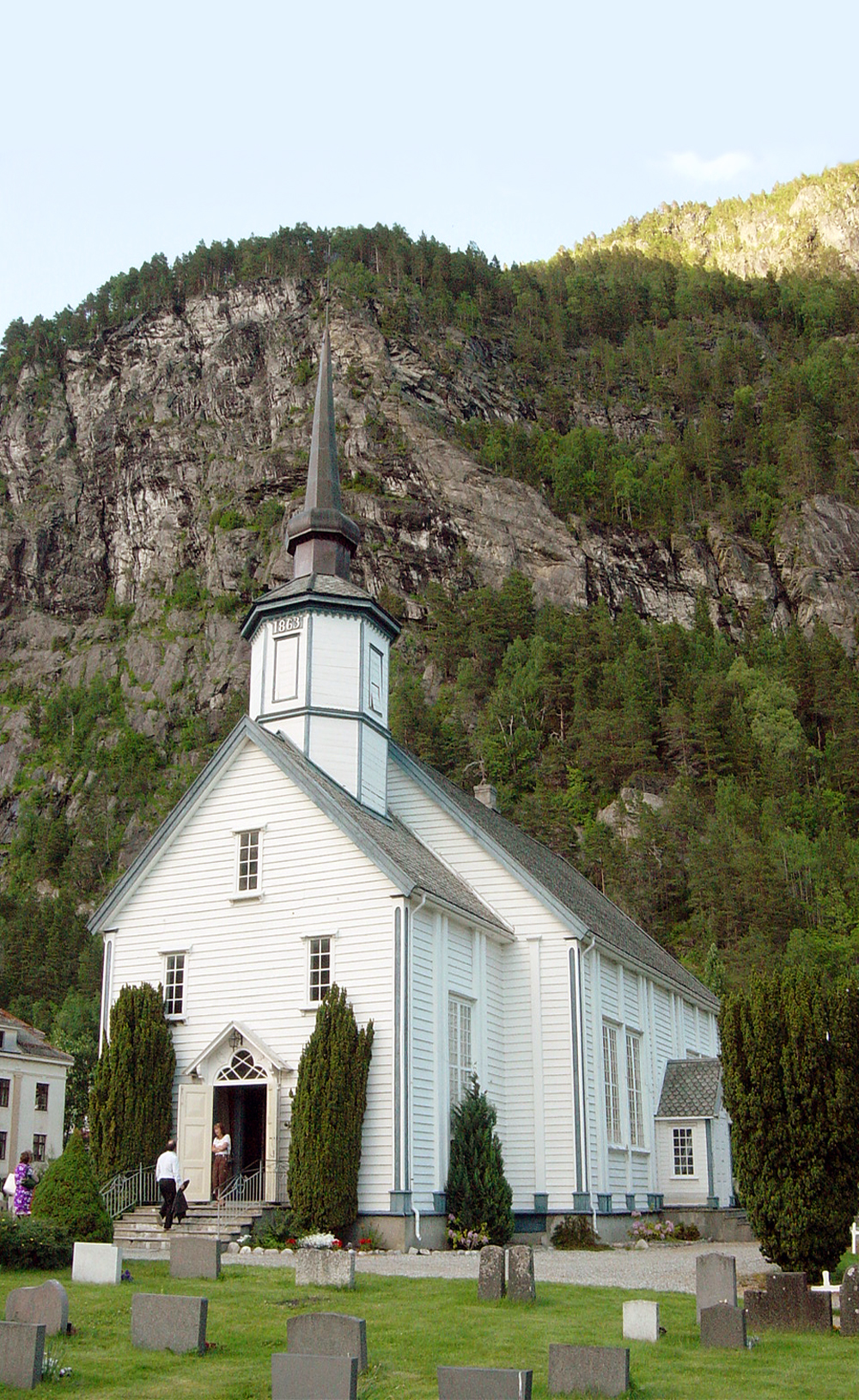
Sylte Church, wood, long church (1863)

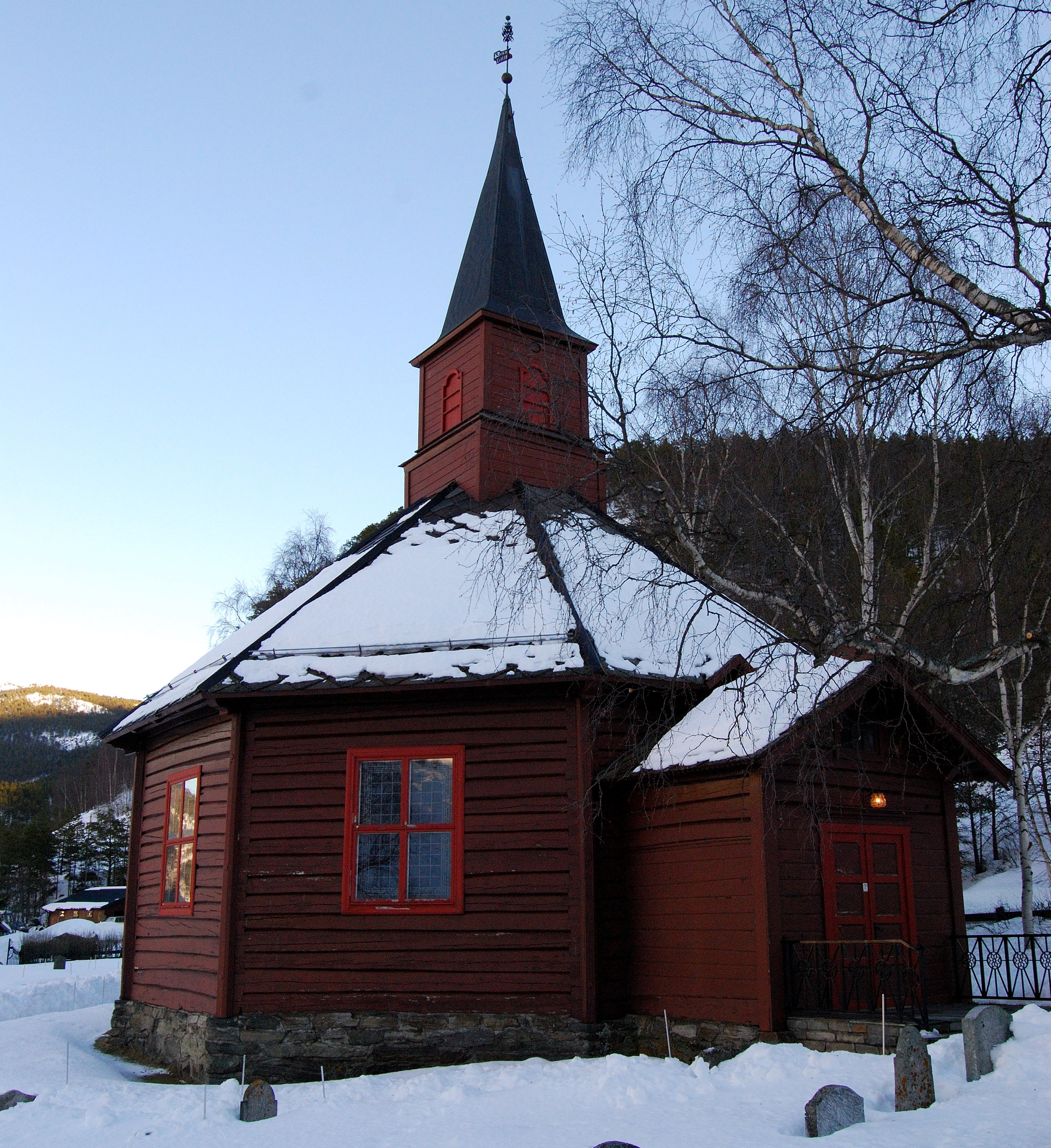
Bøverdal Church, log walls visible (1864)

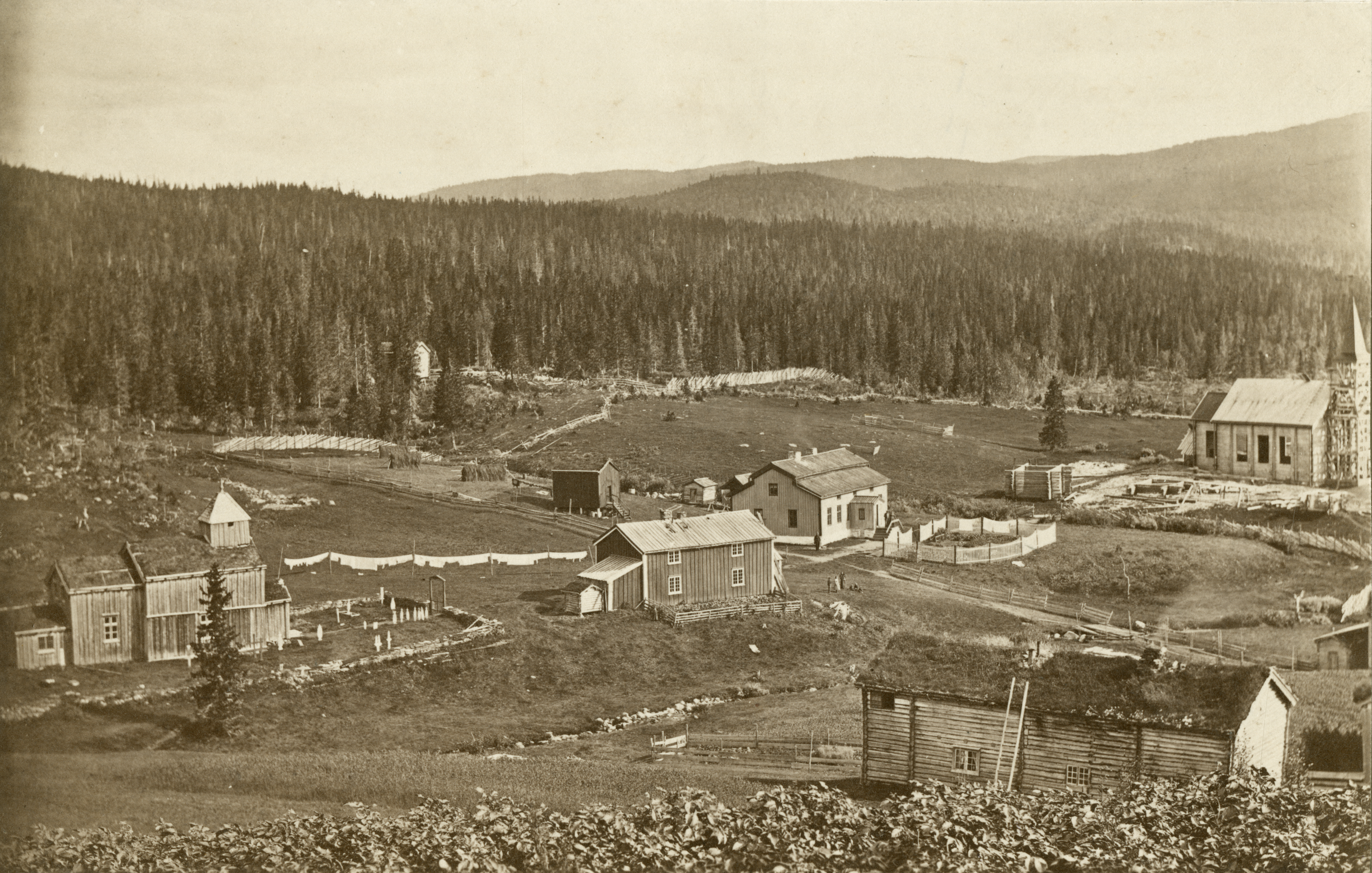
Hattfjelldal Church (1868) under construction (right hand), old church left hand.

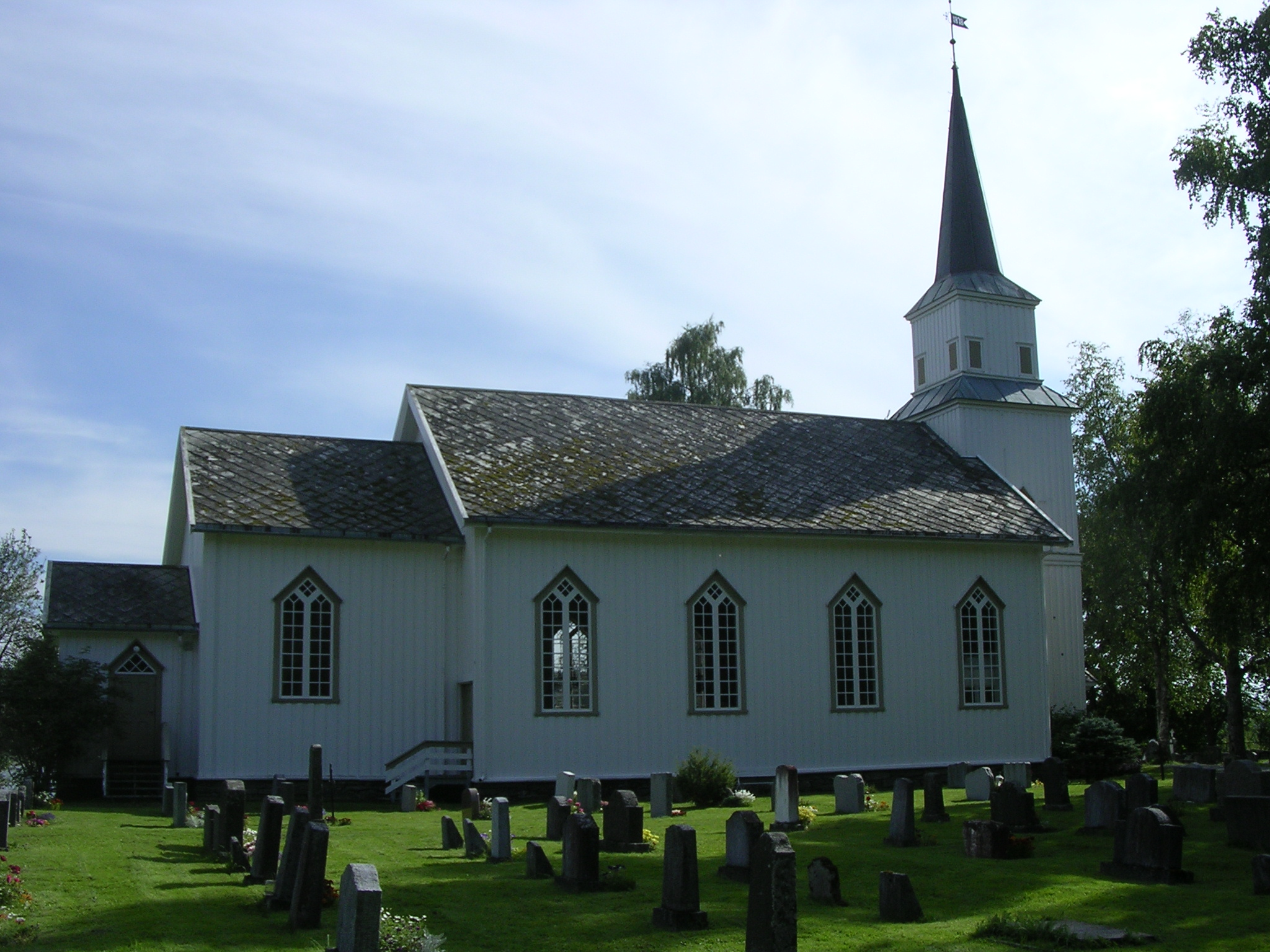
Kvam Church, long church, wood (1878)

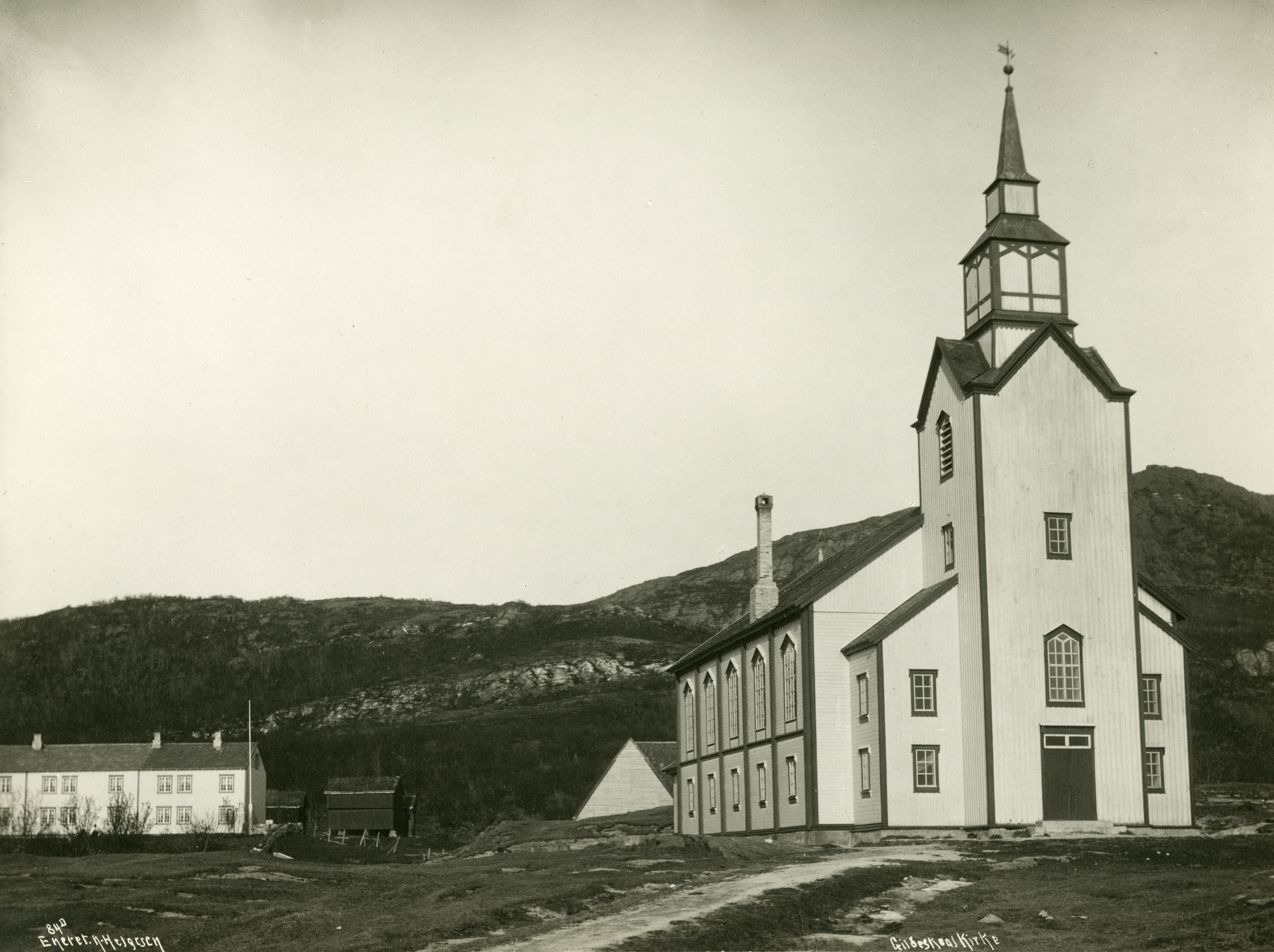
Gildeskål Church, wood, neo-gothic, long church (1881) photo (1890) Thomhav /Riksantikvaren

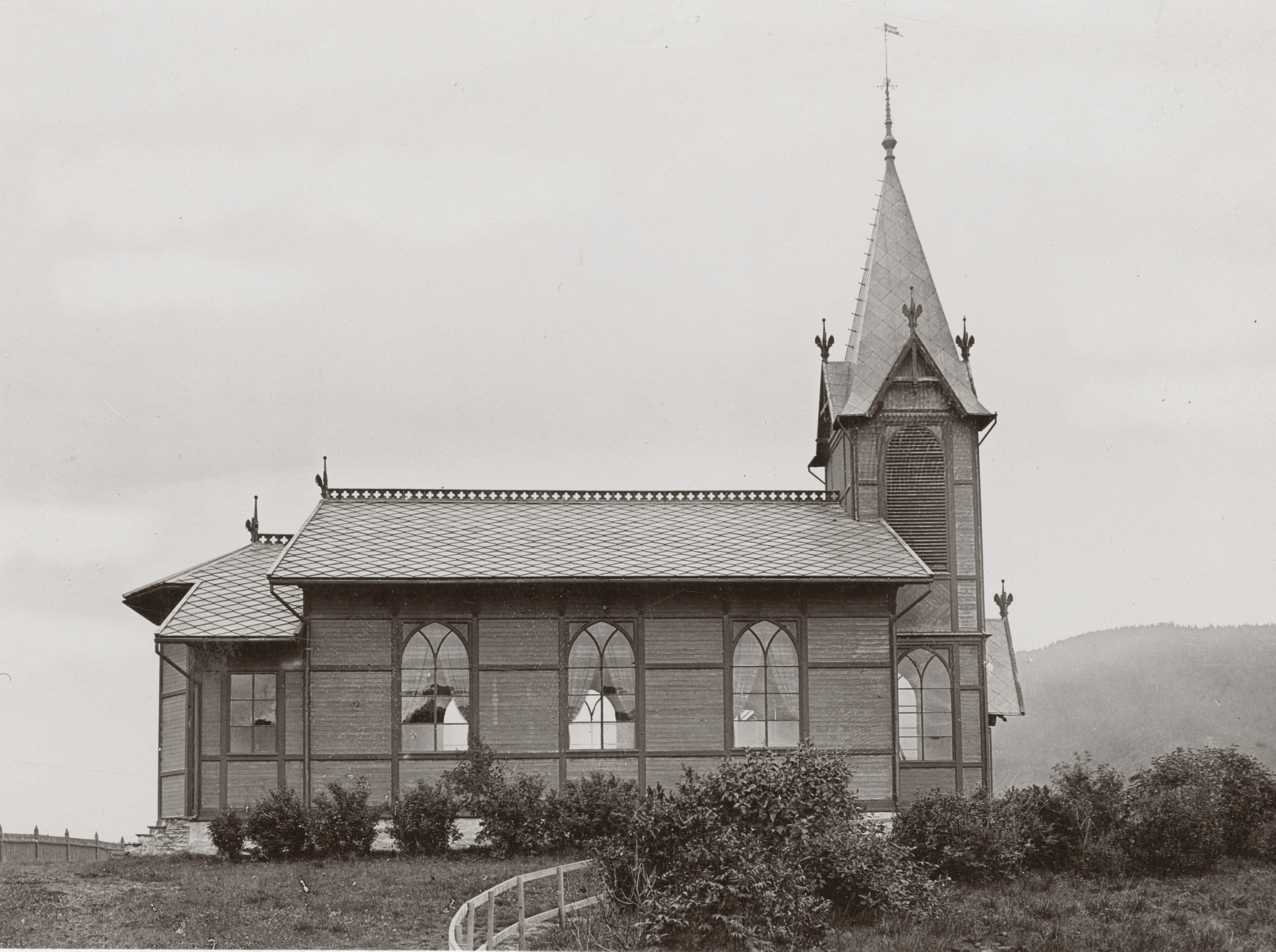
Orkanger Church, original style (1892), photo Thomhav/ Riksantikvaren

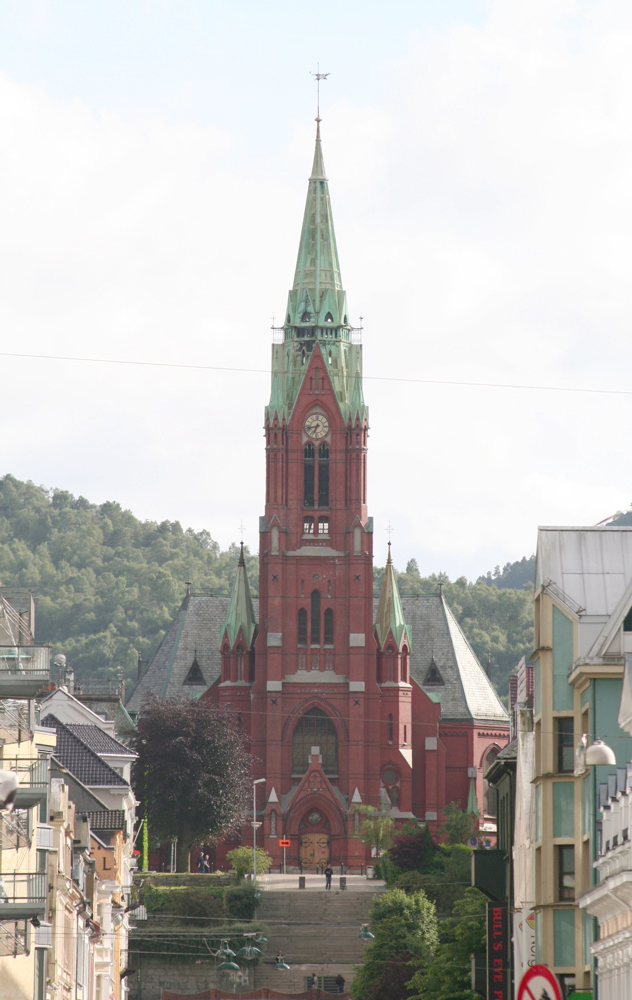
Johanneskirken, Gothic Revival, brick (1894)

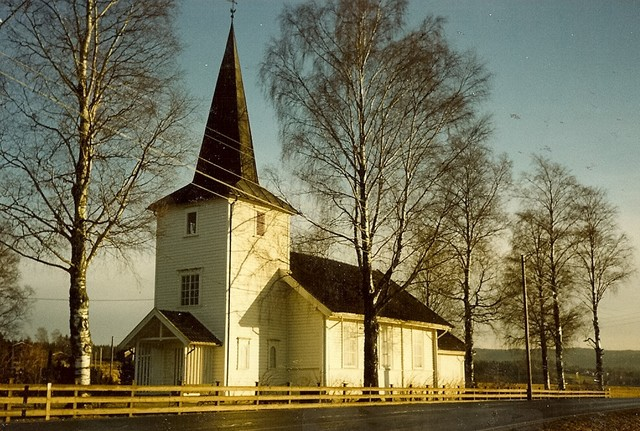
Auli Church, Nes, wood, long church (1907) photo kirkenorge.no

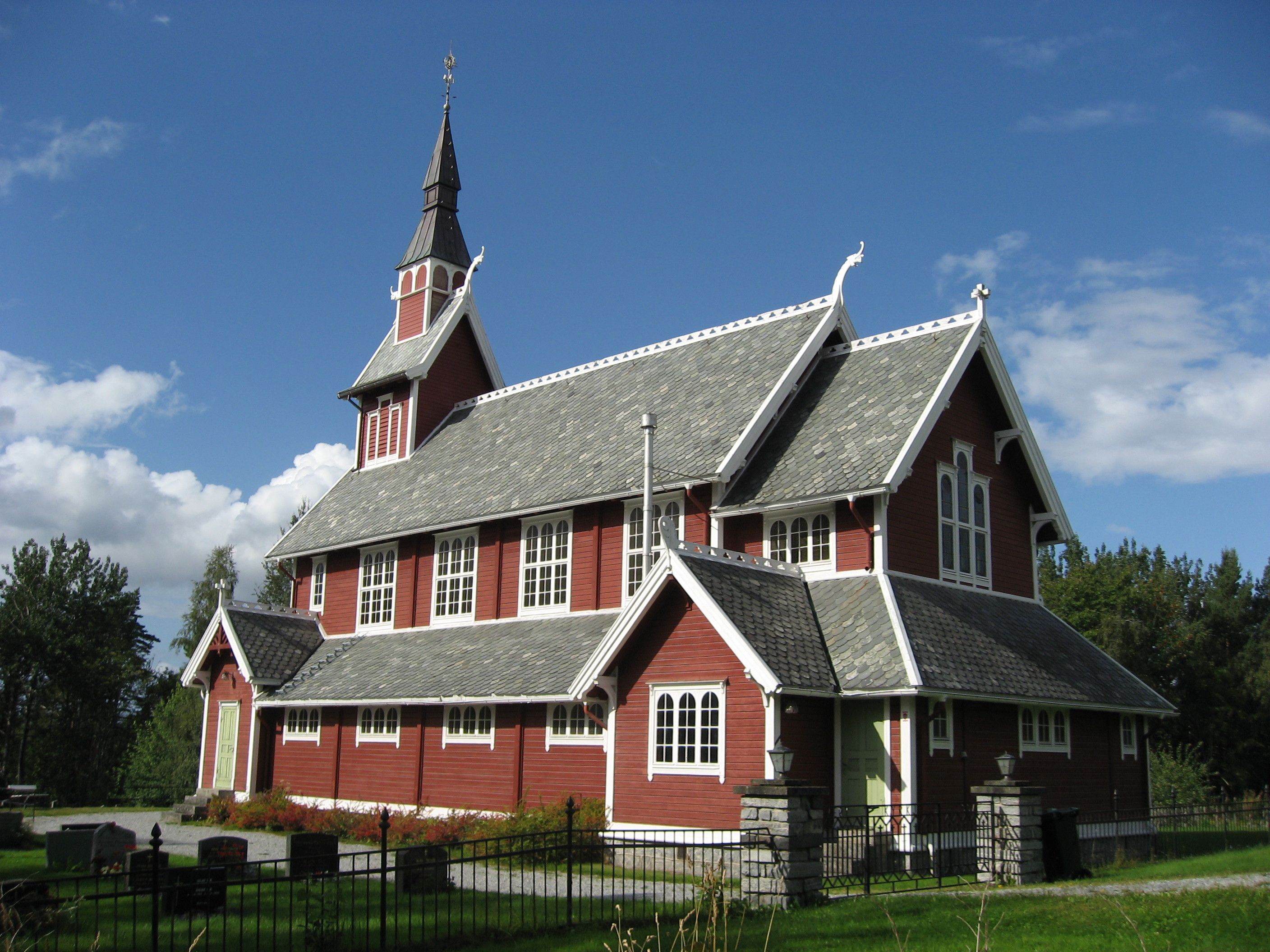
Veøy Church (1907) in dragestil/stave church style.

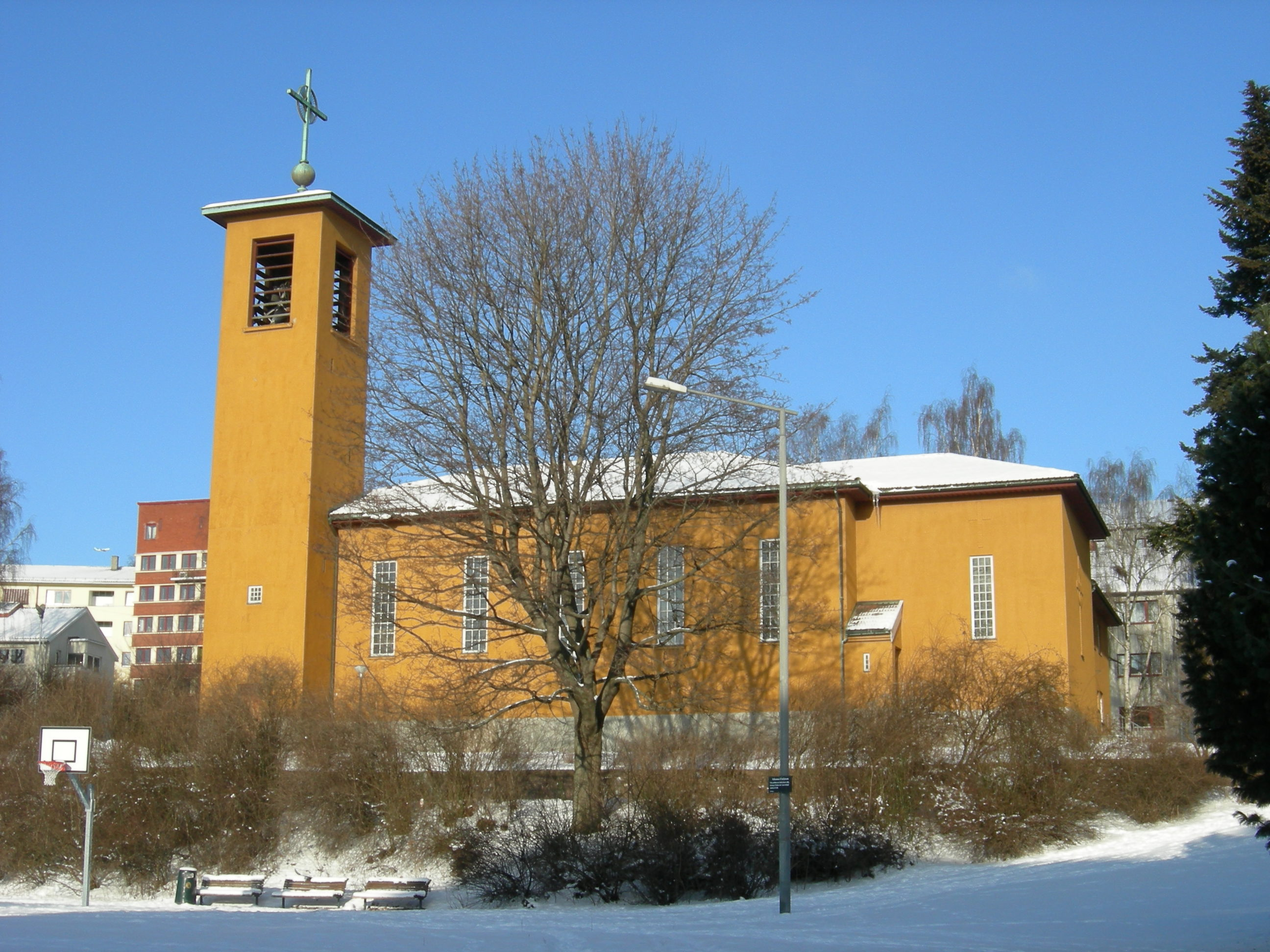
Iladalen Church, Oslo, long church design, brick (1941)

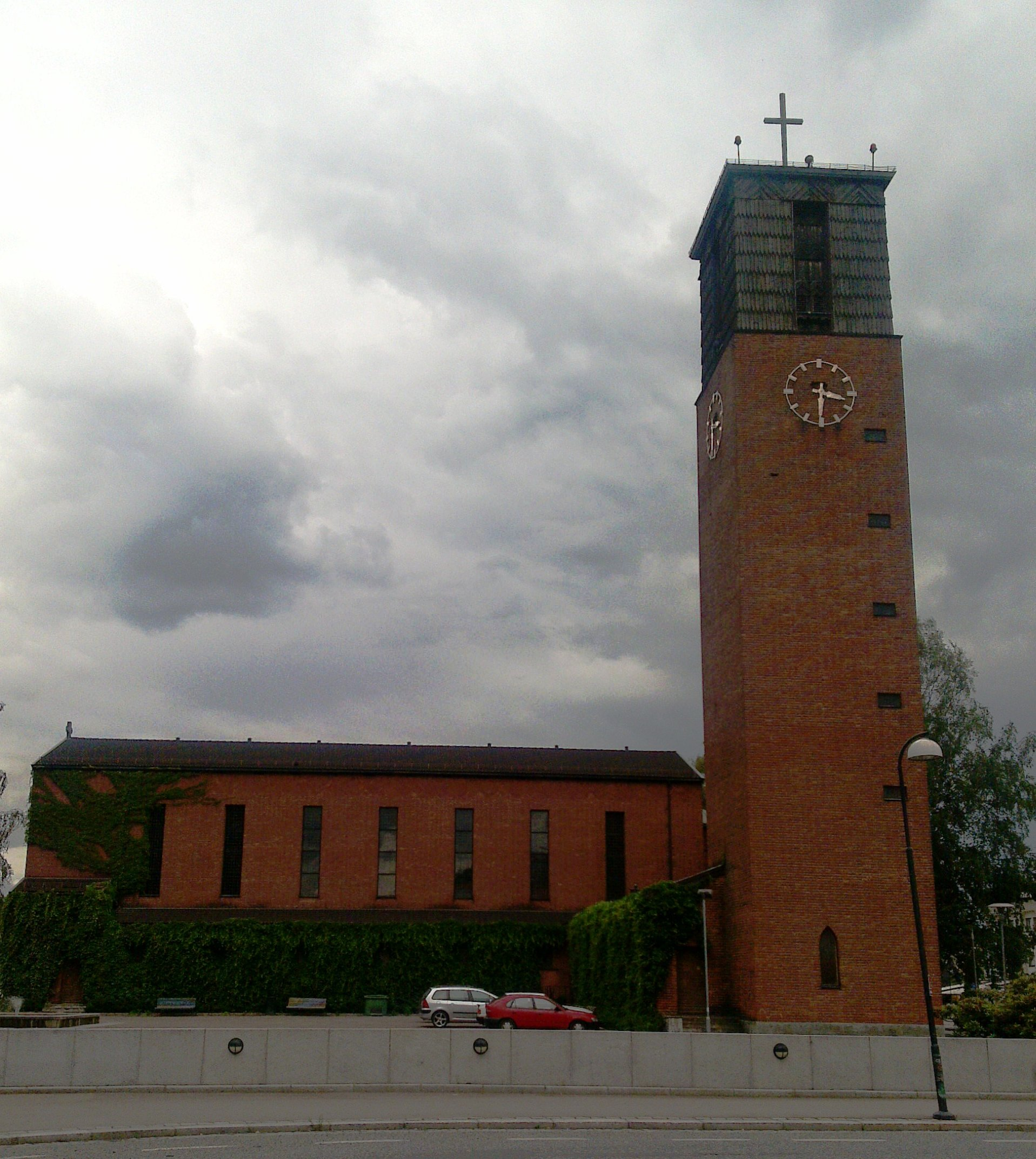
Lillestrøm Church, basilica layout, functionalism (1935)

=== After World War II ===
During this period, modern materials and techniques such as reinforced concrete were introduced. While initially retaining a traditional layout, subsequently modern designs became widespread.

Modern church buildings
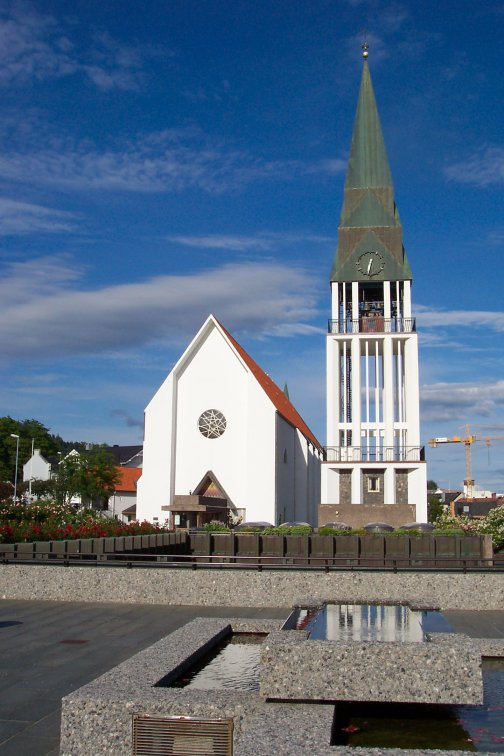
Molde Cathedral, reinforced concrete, long church (1957)

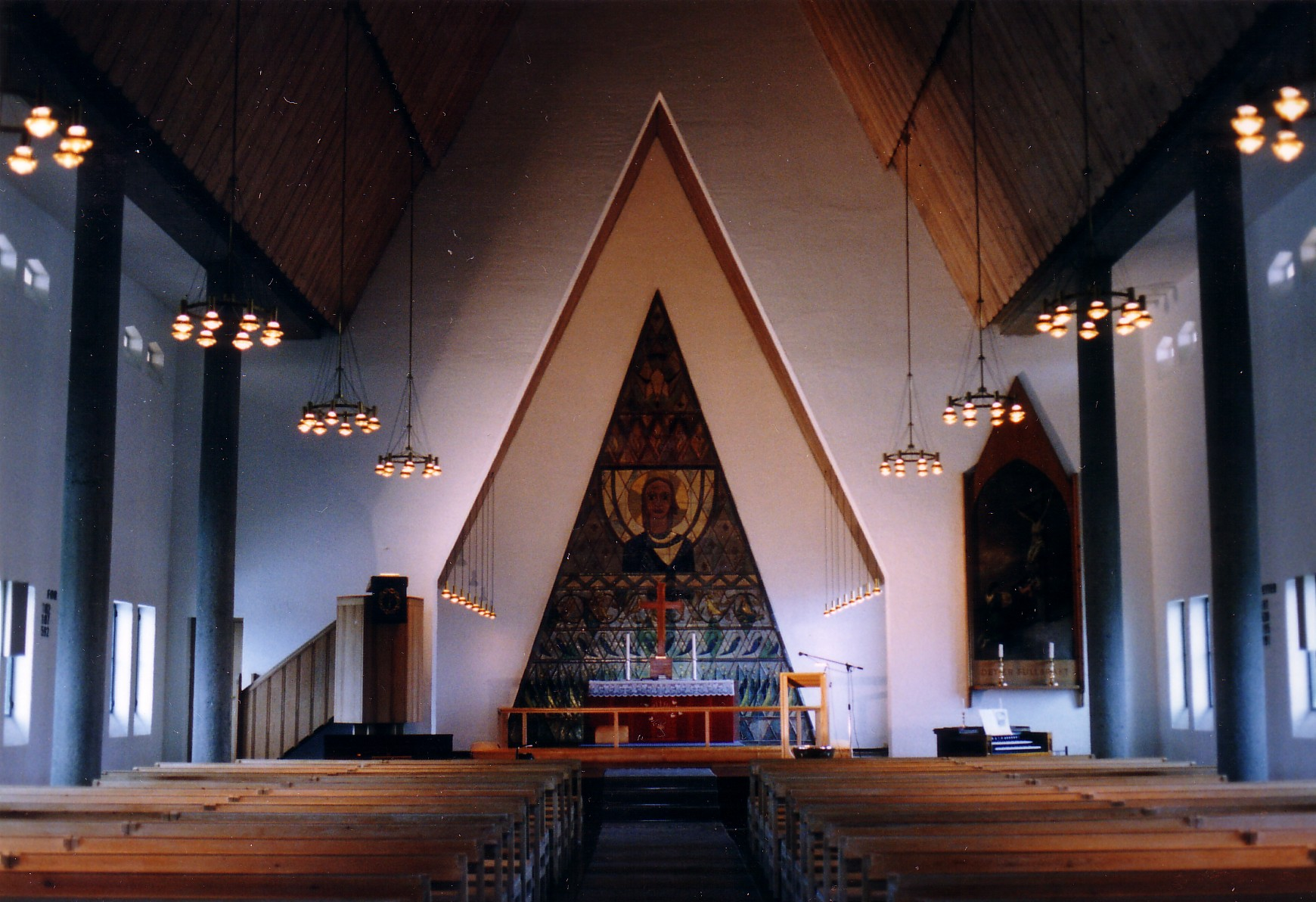
Vardø Church, interior, hall church, concrete (1958)

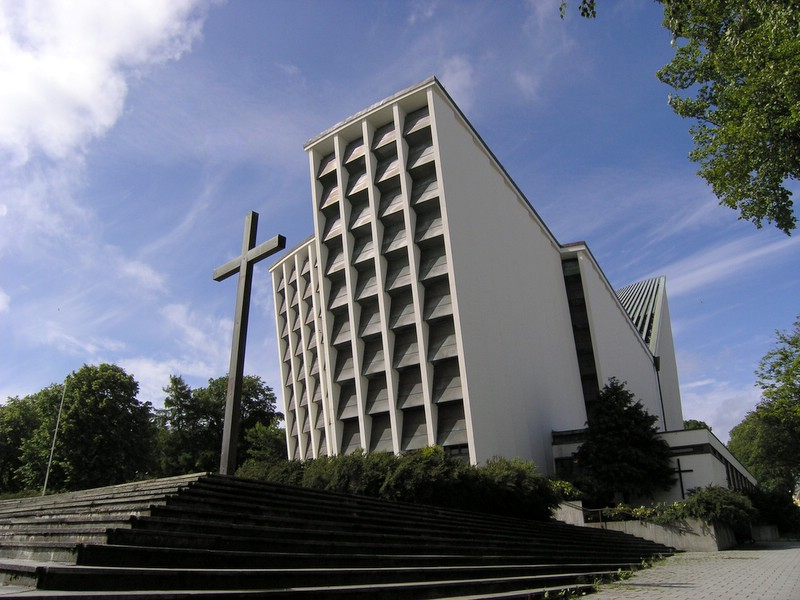
Kirkelandet Church, modern (1964)

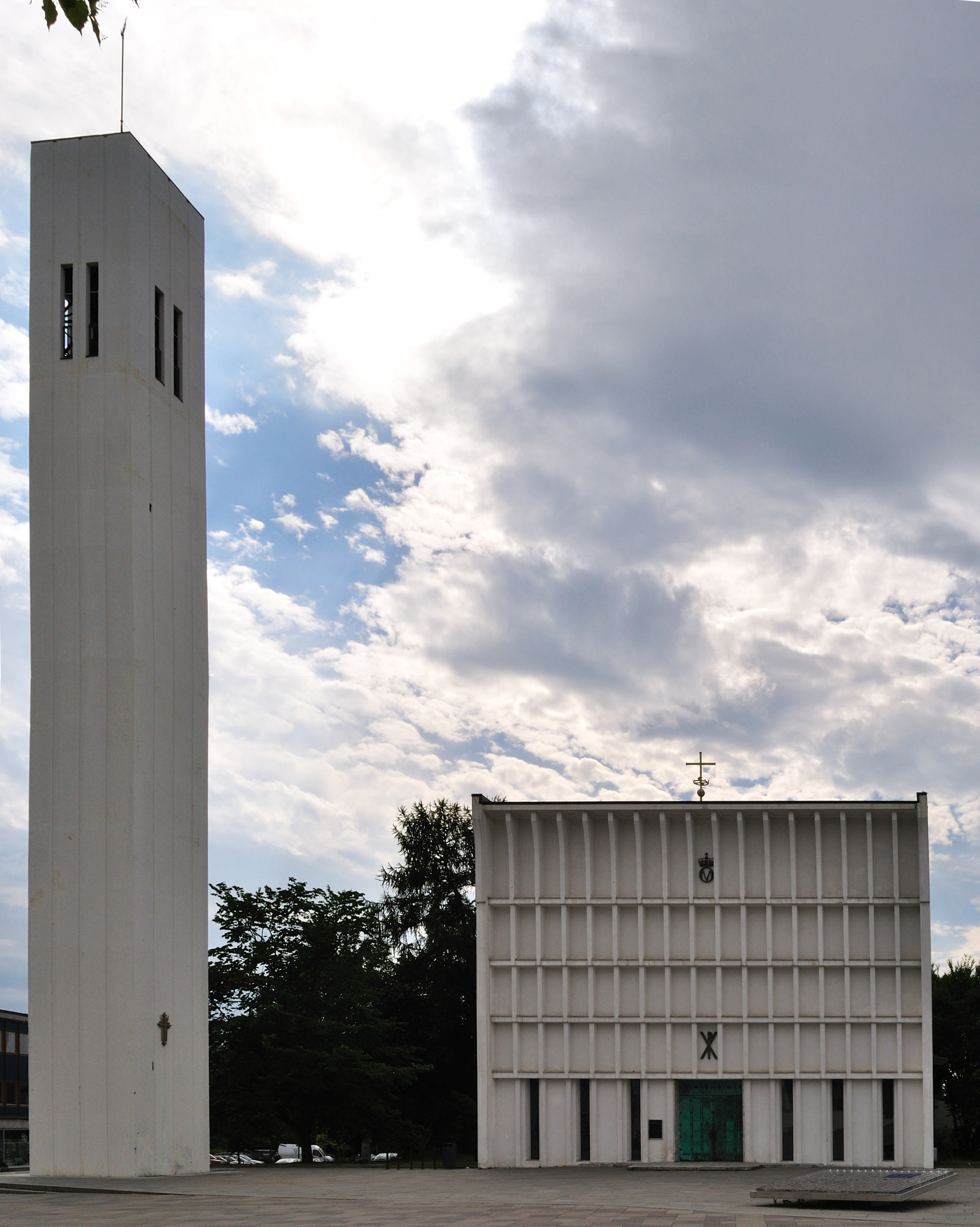
Steinkjer Church, basilica plan, concrete (1965)

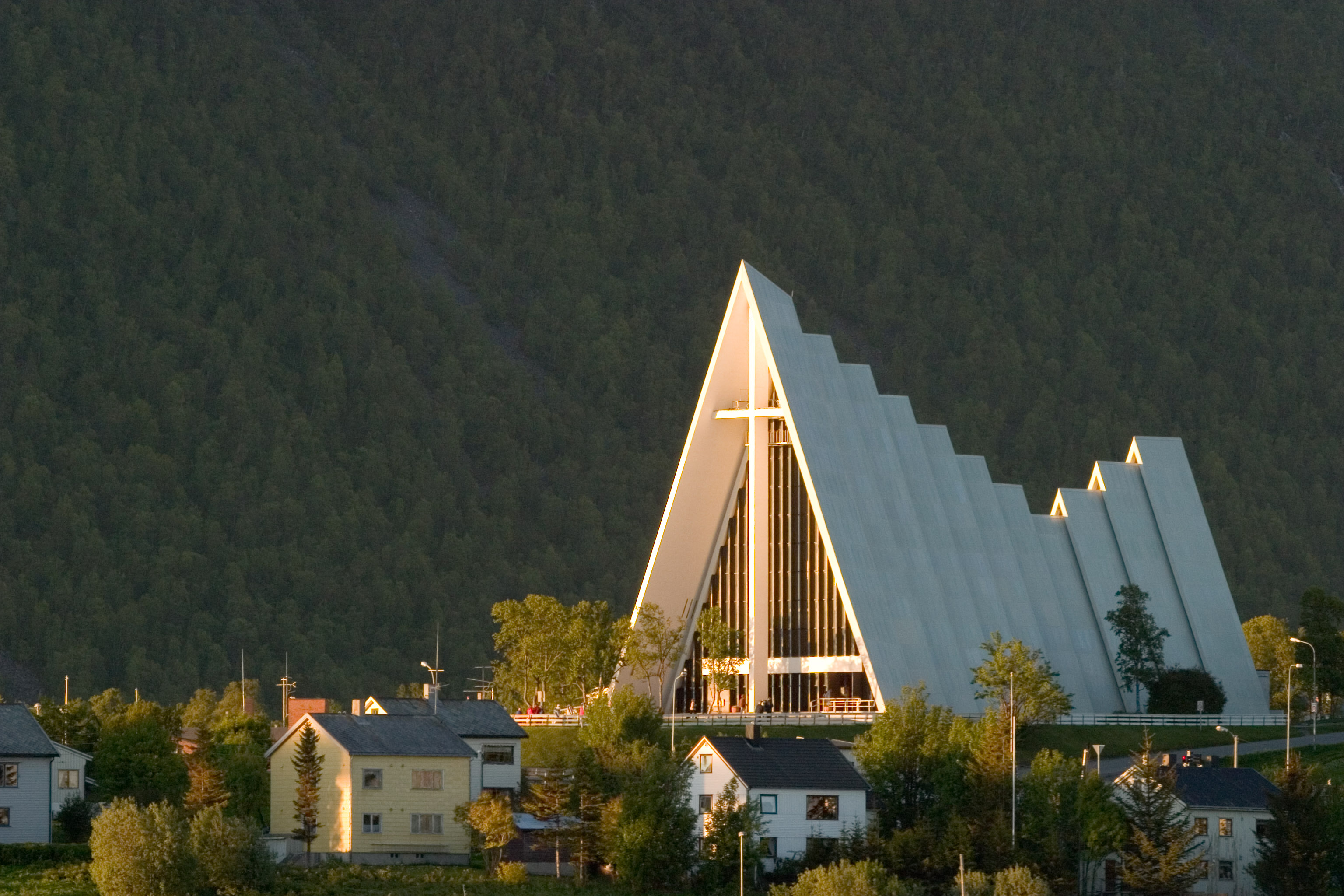
Tromsdalen church "Arctic Cathedral", lightweight concrete, aluminium panels (1965)

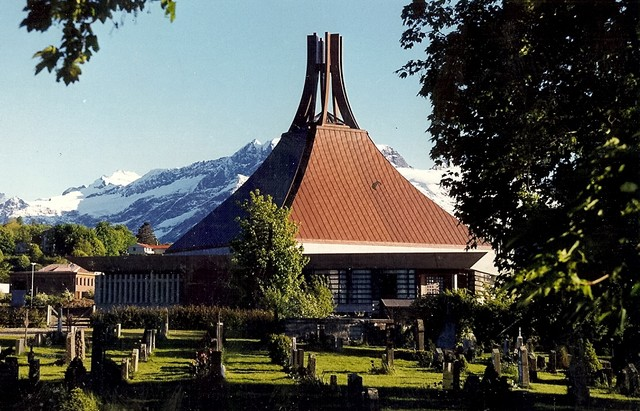
Sykkylven Church, concrete/brick, fan shaped (1990)

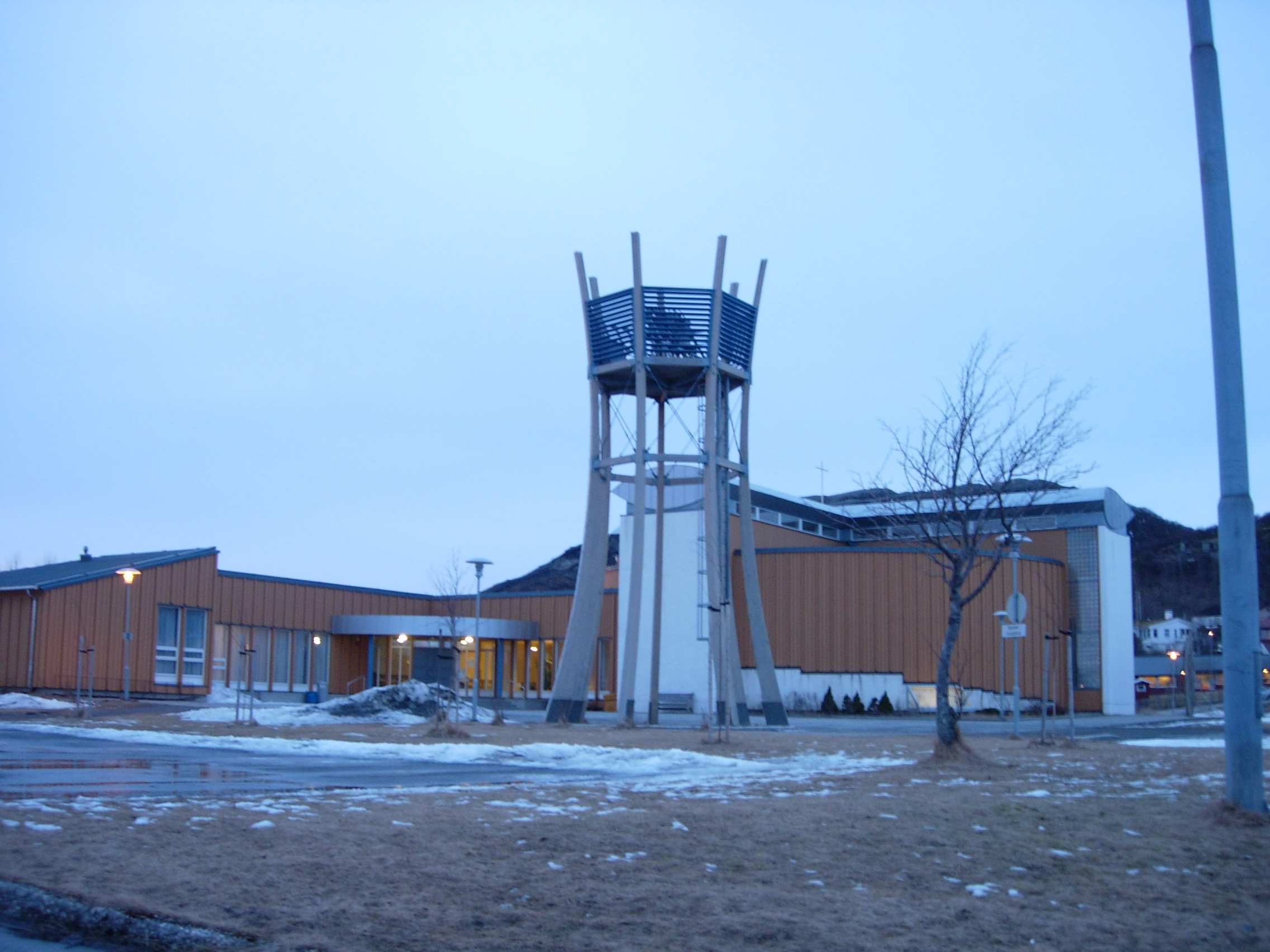
Rønvik Church (1997)

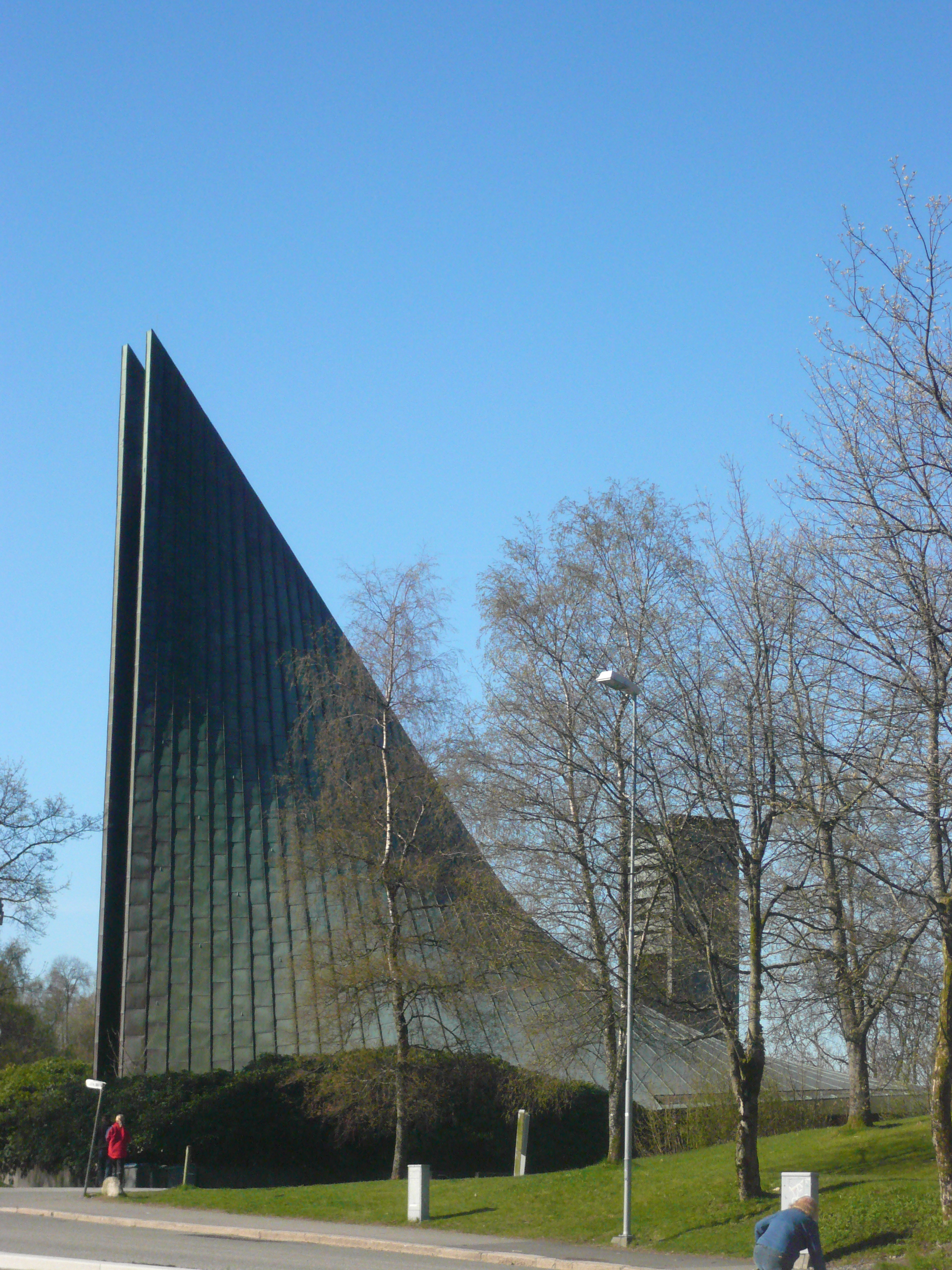
Slettebakken Church (concrete, fan shape, 1970)

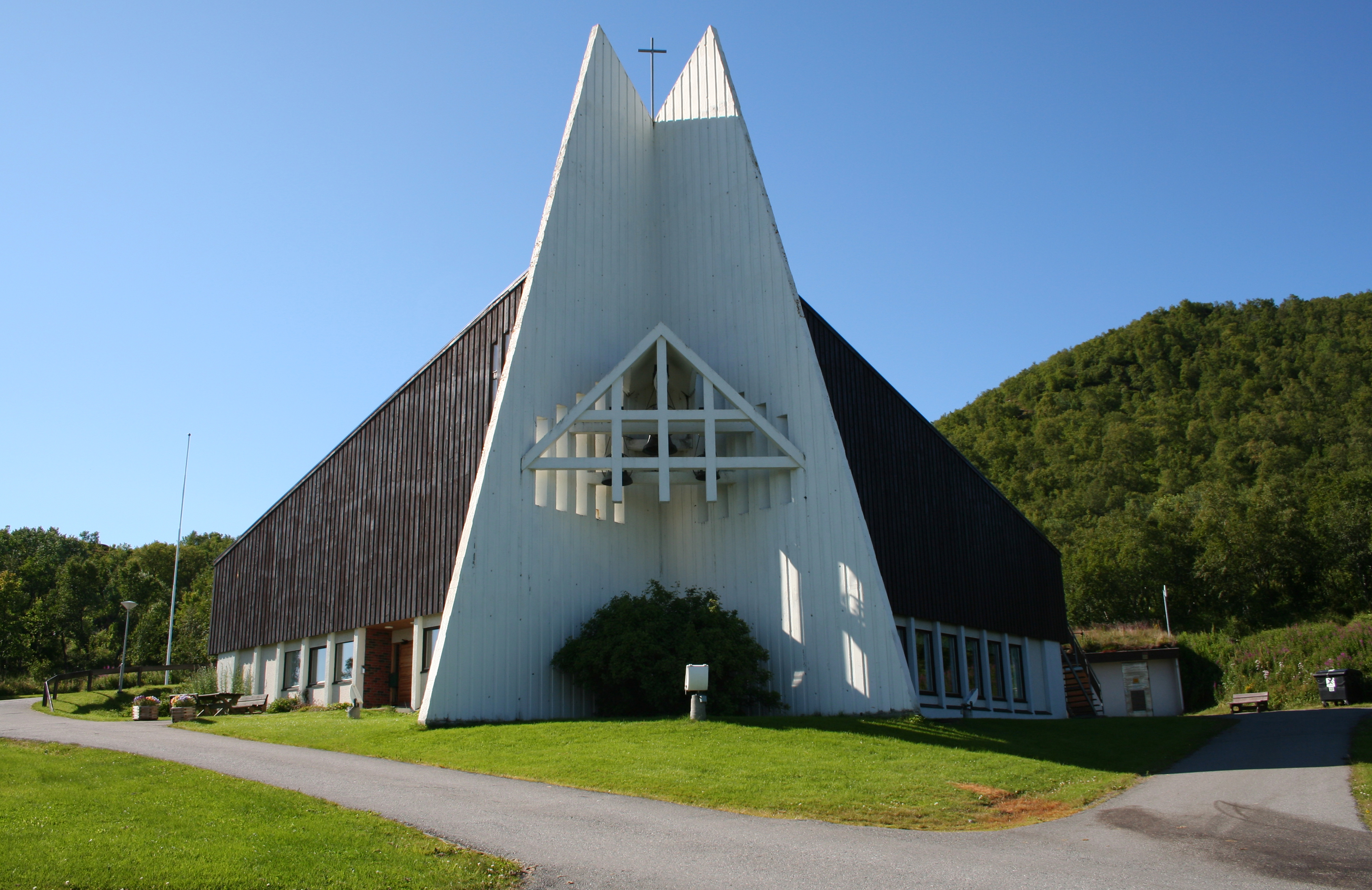
Myre Church (1979), fan shape, concrete and glued laminated timber

== See also ==
- Architecture of Norway
- Stave church
- List of stave churches in Norway
- Post church
- Palisade church
- Octagonal churches in Norway
- Gospel Halls (not regarded as church building in this article)
- Norges kirker – building documentation project
- Category:Lists of churches in Norway

== Bibliography ==
Liepe, Lena. Medieval Stone Churches of Northern Norway. The Interpretation of Architecture as a Historical Process, Tromsø: Ravnetrykk 25, 2001.
