= Octagonal churches in Norway =

Type of church design used in Norway

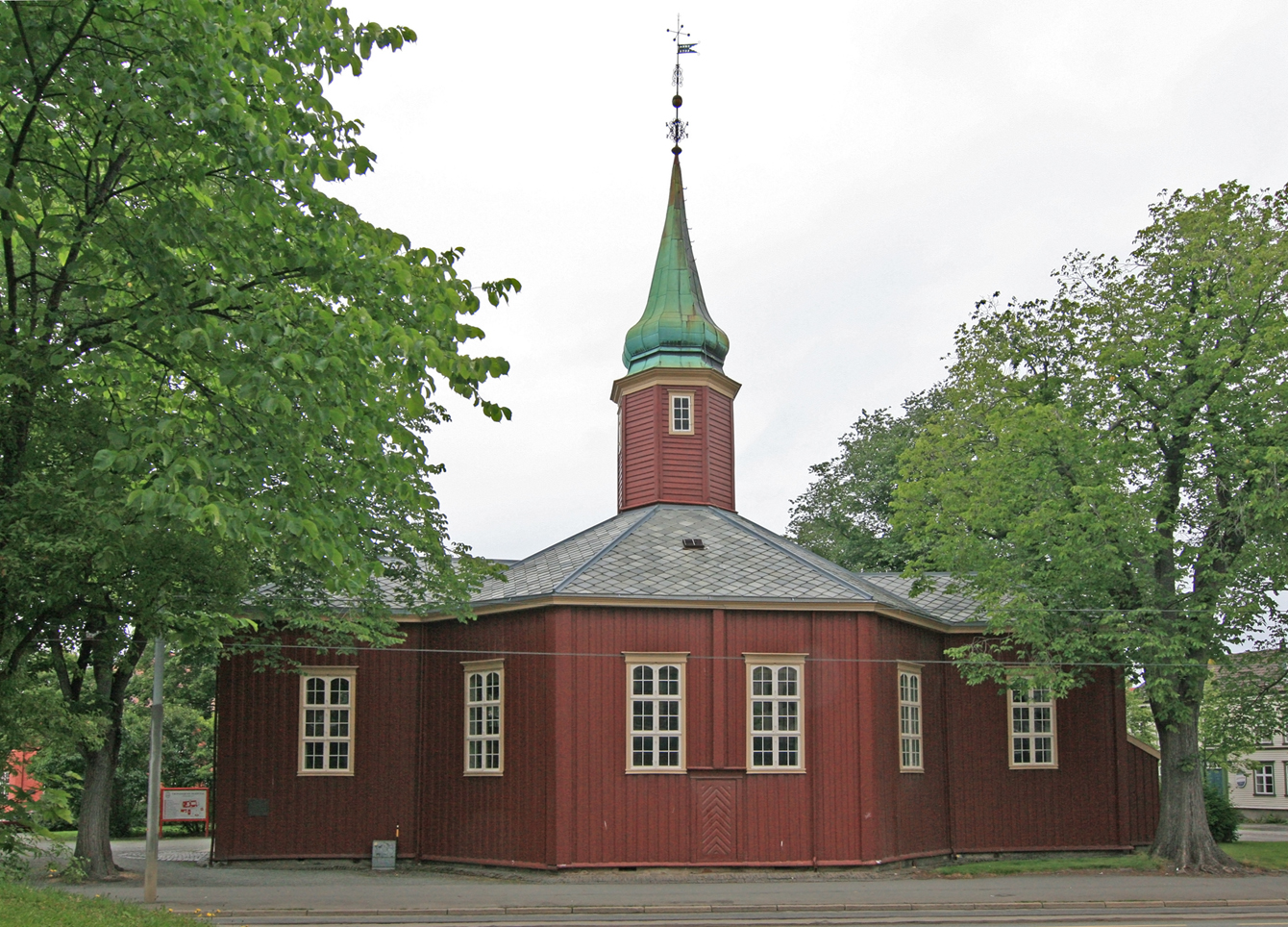
Hospitalskirken in Trondheim - the oldest octagonal church in Norway. Credit: Mahlum

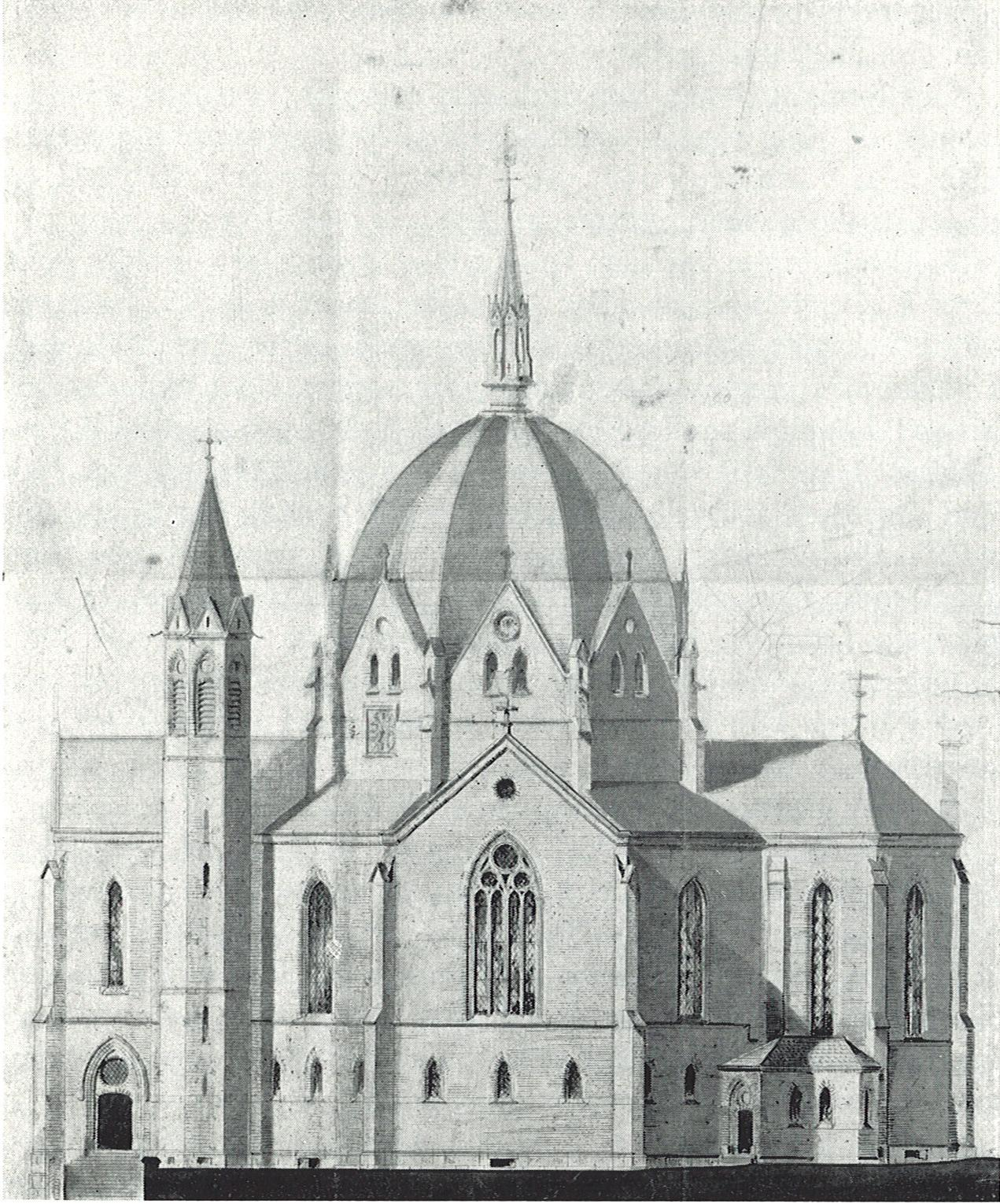
Wilhelm von Hanno: Trinity Church with its octagonal dome

An octagonal church has an octagonal (eight-sided polygon) architectural plan. The exterior and the interior (the nave) may be shaped as eight-sided polygon with approximately equal sides or only the nave is eight-sided supplemented by choir and porch (or narthex) attached to the octagon. This architectural plan is found in some 70 churches in Norway. Among these Hospitalskirken in Trondheim is the oldest. This type of church plan spread from the Diocese of Nidaros to other parts of Norway. Virtually all octagonal churches in Norway are constructed as log buildings mostly covered by clapboards. Some of the largest churches in Norway are octagonal and the list includes important cultural heritage monuments such as Trinity Church (Oslo), Sør-Fron Church, and Røros Church.

This is the bright and solemn church room of classicism, whether it is such a large building [as Røros Church] or the modest rural log churches, the interior is covered and interconnected by cheerful colors of the Roccoco in marbling and ceiling. This was our last independent contribution to ecclesiastical architecture.

— Leif Østby, Norges Kunsthistorie

== History ==
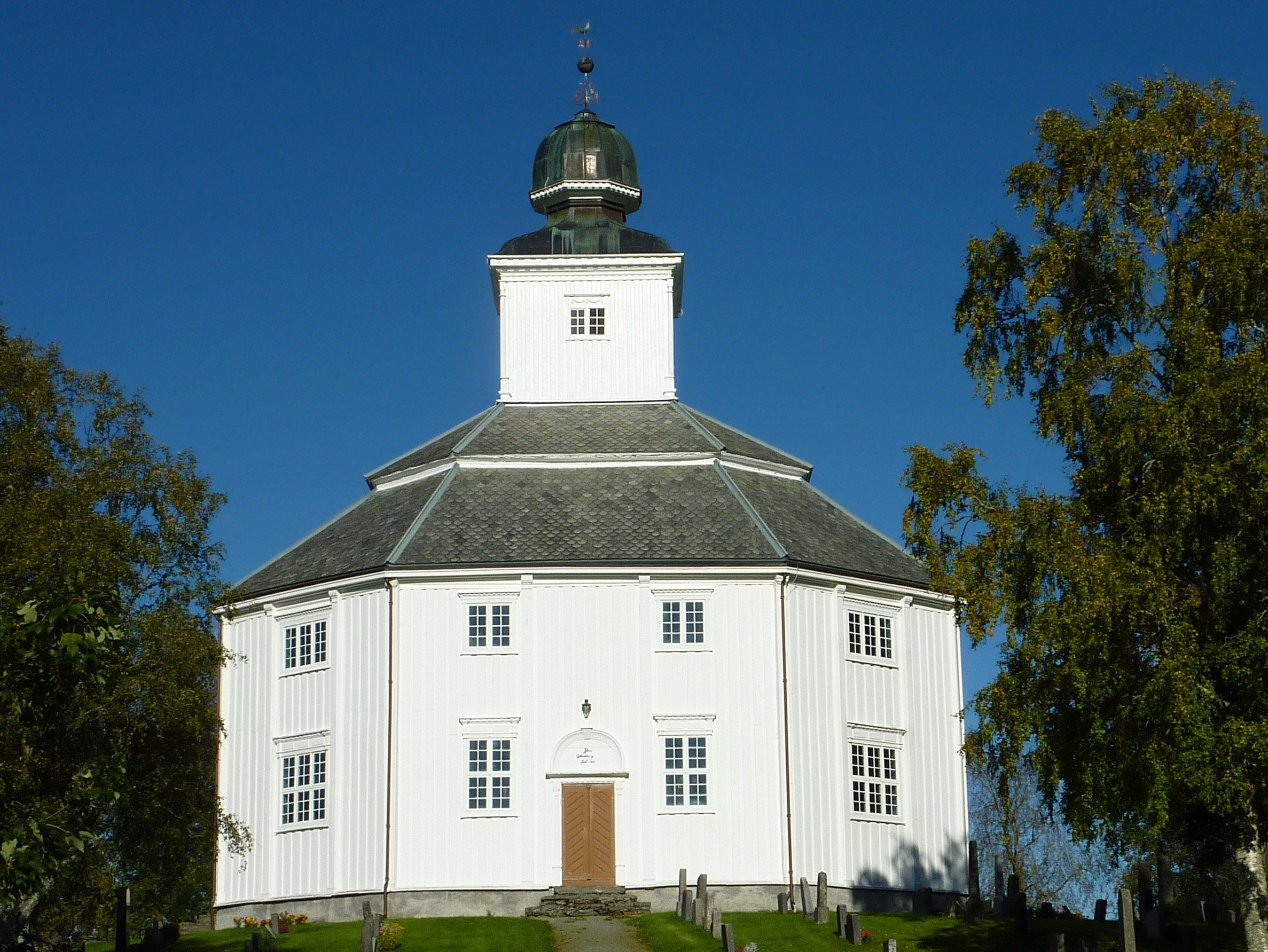
Klæbu Church (1790) designed by Lars Forsæth.

Floorplan of Zum Friedefürsten Church showing the centrally placed altar (1).

During the Middle Ages, some 1000 wooden stave churches and only 270 stone churches were erected in Norway. During the 15th and 16th centuries, virtually no new churches were built. When church building resumed around the year 1600, most stave churches disappeared and were often replaced by log churches. While in most of Europe, only masonry churches were built, wood construction still dominated in Norway. During the 1600s, the cruciform floor plan tended to replace the traditional simple rectangular "long church". In the cruciform church, the view to the altar is partly obstructed by walls, a drawback that is not found in the octagonal shape. The octagonal shape also allows the pulpit to be the focal point, according to the ideals of the Reformation where the spoken word (the sermon) should be the central act during a worship service. Lorentz Dietrichson believed that the octagonal church became popular because of the rationalism's need for the church as a lecture hall ("auditorium").

In 1686, the first octagonal church in Norway, Vrådal Church, was constructed in Vrådal (in Telemark). It was a log building that replaced a medieval stave church. The Vrådal church apparently did not influence subsequent octagonal buildings in Norway. Inspiration for the first octagonal churches in Trøndelag probably came from elsewhere in Protestant Europe. Some octagonal churches within Lutheranism were erected at the same time in Sweden and Germany for instance Zum Friedefürsten Church in Saxony and Järlåsa Church in Sweden. In the Netherlands, the reformed church in Willemstad, North Brabant, Koepelkerk (Domed Church) (1607), the first Protestant church building in the Netherlands, was given an octagonal shape according to Calvinism's focus on the sermon. The Oostkerk, Middelburg is a domed, octagonal church erected from 1648 to 1667. Johan Christopher Hempel, architect and master builder of Hospitalskirken in Trondheim, was probably from the Netherlands where the octagonally shaped church first appeared and spread to other Protestant countries in Northern Europe. The octagonal floor plan came to Denmark when Frederiksberg Church was built by Dutch Felix Dusart. Dusart used a church in his Dutch hometown as a model. Frederiksberg Church is in turn regarded as the model for the octagonal baroque church (1756) in Rellingen, Schleswig-Holstein. The Rellingen Church, a key baroque monument in Schleswig-Holstein, is shown on the town's coat of arms. The baroque Katharinenkirche in Großenaspe, Schleswig-Holstein, is an octagonal design with "pulpit altar" (″Kanzelaltar″ in German) used for instance in Sør-Fron Church. During the 18th century, both Schleswig-Holstein and Norway were a part of the Kingdom of Denmark-Norway. Hosar suggests that Norwegian troops did military service in Schleswig-Holstein, and may have observed the new churches being constructed there at the time.

The octagonal shape provides a more rigid log structure than the simple rectangular long church design, allowing a larger nave to be built. Christie believes that this is why the octagonal design was adopted alongside the cruciform plan. Starting in 1810, ten octagonal churches were erected in the rural interior parts of Agder, most of these constructions used Hornnes Church as model.

== Construction ==
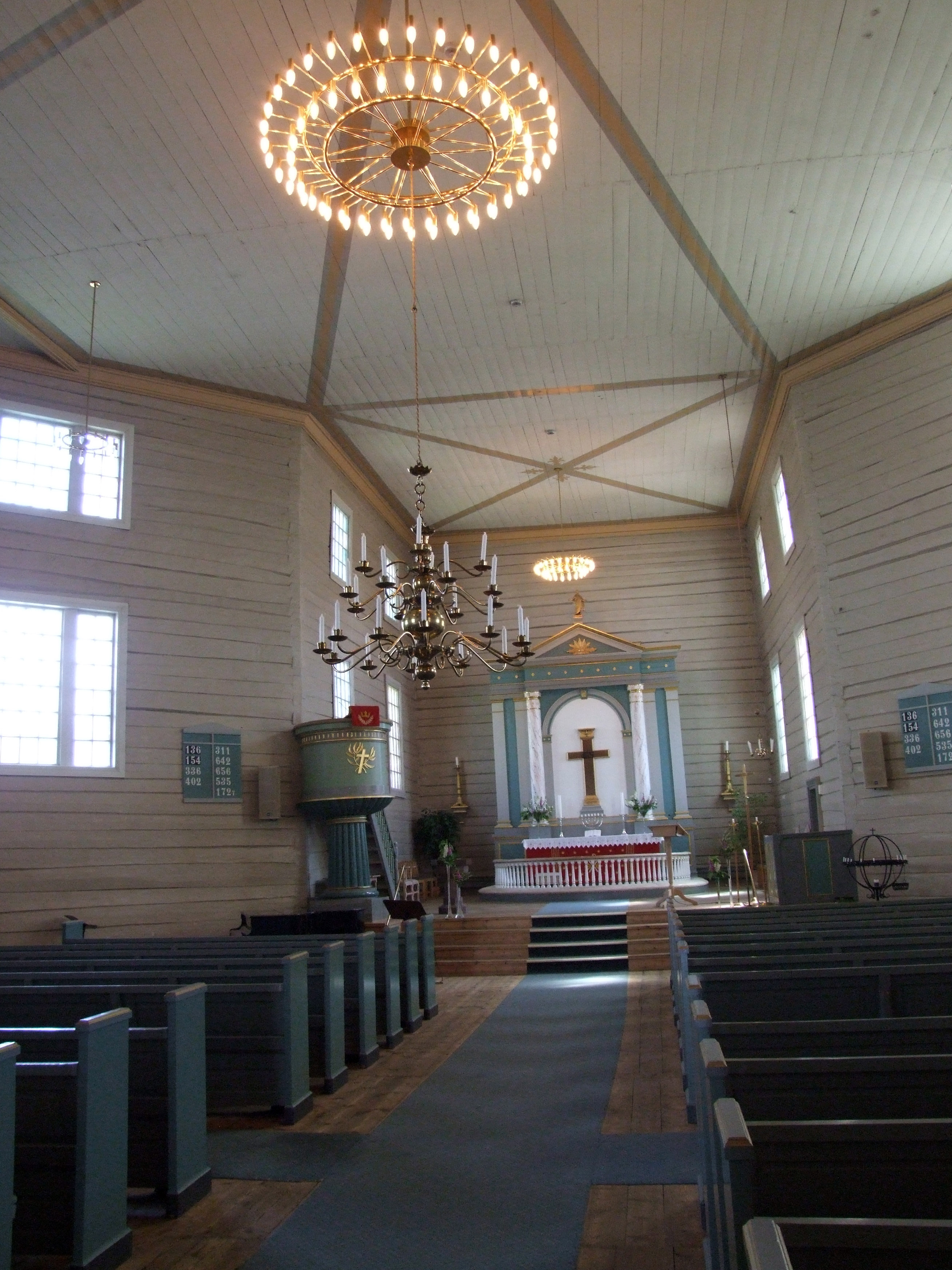
Interior of Flekkefjord Church

Virtually all octagonal churches in Norway are built from timber in a log construction, notable exceptions are Sør-Fron Church, Vang Church at Ridabu in Hamar Municipality, and Røros Church (stone buildings). Trinity Church (Oslo) is the only octagonal church in Norway built in red brick. These masonry buildings are also the largest among the octagonal churches. The octagonal plan creates different angles and accordingly more challenging work for the carpenter compared to buildings with straight angels such as the cruciform plan. The cruciform plan was the dominant church design in Norway when the octagonal plan was introduced. The octagonal plan offers better view of the choir compared to the cruciform plan. The octagonal plan also creates a more rigid wood construction then the simple rectangular plan ("long church" or "hall church") allowing taller and wider buildings with a single room. Håkon Christie believed that these are the reasons the octagonal church became popular in Norway. In the basilica-shaped Samnanger Church, the corners of the aisles are cut creating an octagonal plan. This design was chosen to make the walls shorter and avoiding the need to splice logs.

== Architects ==
Until the 19th century, Norwegian churches were often designed and constructed by master builders rather than by professionally trained architects. Johan Christopher Hempel, chief mason and builder of Trondheim, designed the two oldest existing octagonal churches. Master builder and politician Elling Olsson Walbøe designed and constructed at least three octagonal churches. Parish priests were also involved, at least three octagonal churches were designed by their respective pastors (Ulstein Church, Old Stordal Church, and Vang Church). For instance, Abraham Pihl designed the large Vang Church in Ridabu. A large number of churches, including several octagonal, were constructed according to prototypes compiled by Hans Linstow.

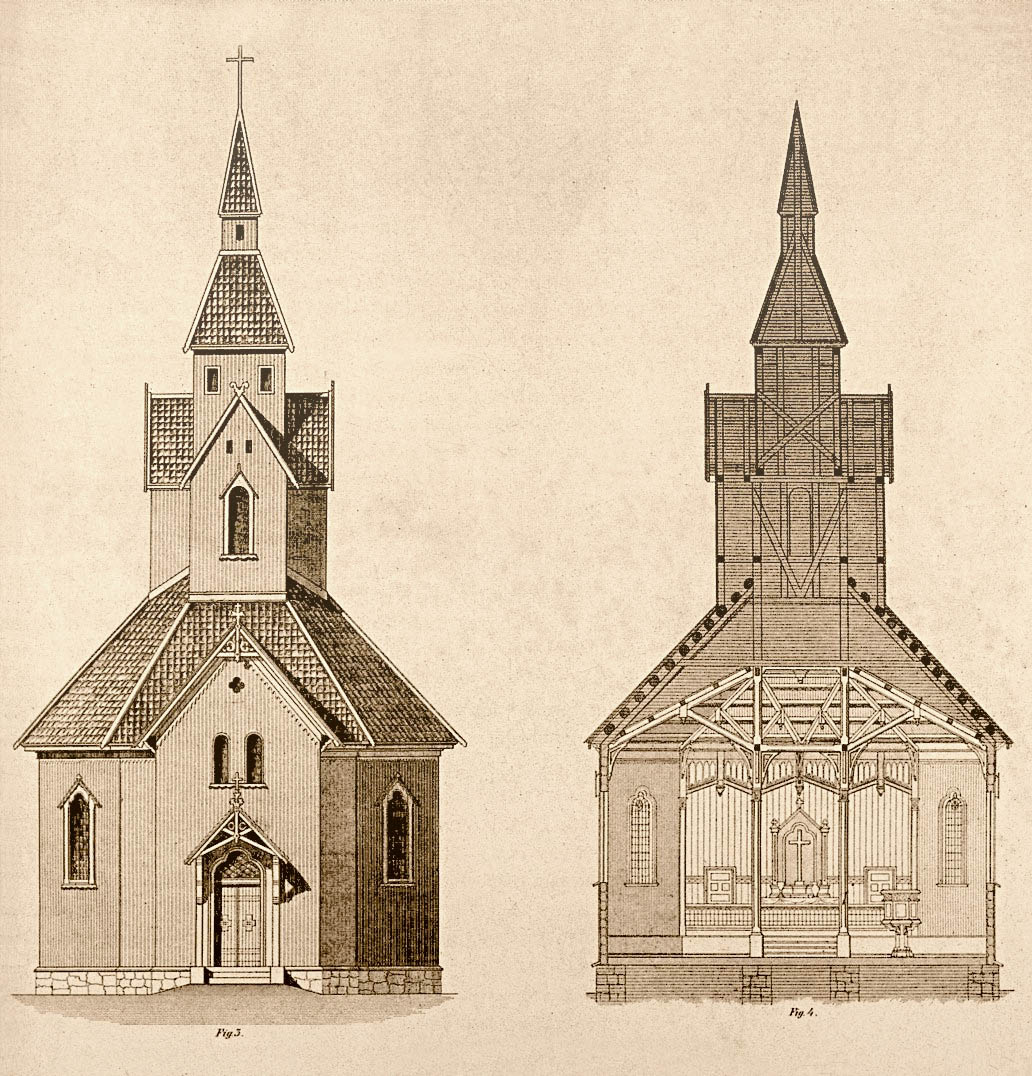
Drawing by Grosch

The prominent architect Christian H. Grosch were responsible for a number of churches in Norway, including the basic plan for several octagonal churches, including

- Mo Church in Nord-Odal Municipality
- Tjugum Church in Balestrand Municipality
- Otterøy Church in Namsos Municipality
- Rogne Church in Øystre Slidre Municipality
- Dverberg Church in Andøy Municipality
- Tangen Church in Stange Municipality
- the old Kirkenes Church in Sør-Varanger Municipality which was destroyed during World War II

Farmer and "founding father" Lars Larsen Forsæth produced drawings used to build at least three octagonal churches:

- Klæbu Church in Trondheim Municipality
- Støren Church in Midtre Gauldal Municipality
- Hornnes Church in Evje og Hornnes Municipality

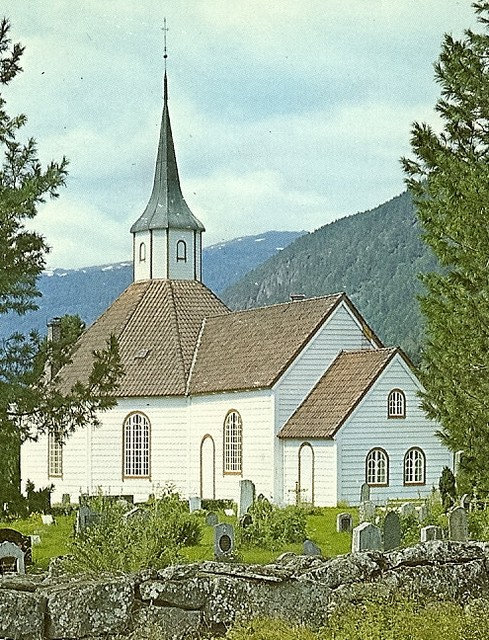
Innvik Church designed by Elling Walbøe (one of the "founding fathers").

== Distribution ==
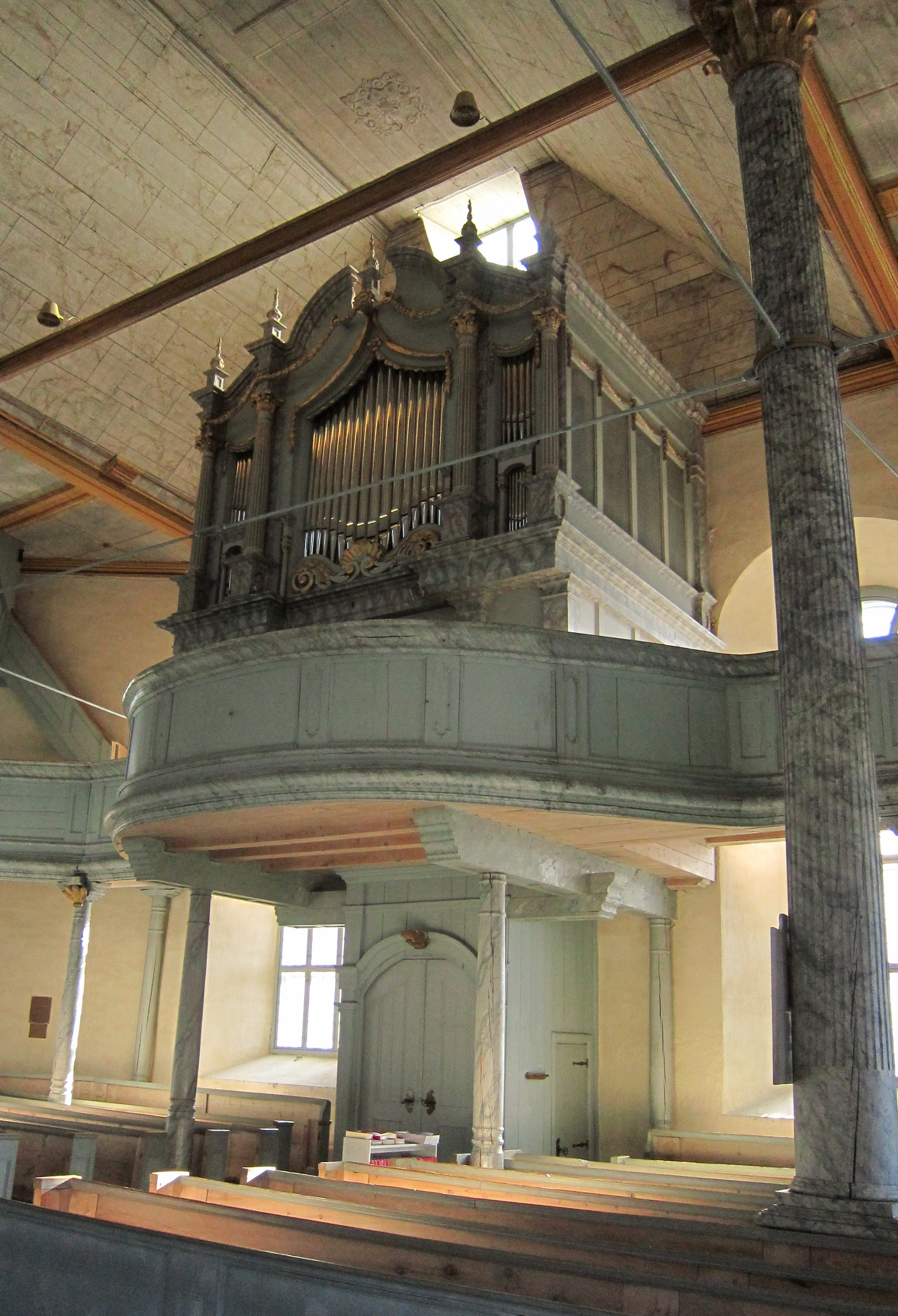
Sør-Fron church interior, organ on gallery, beams and trusses supporting roof

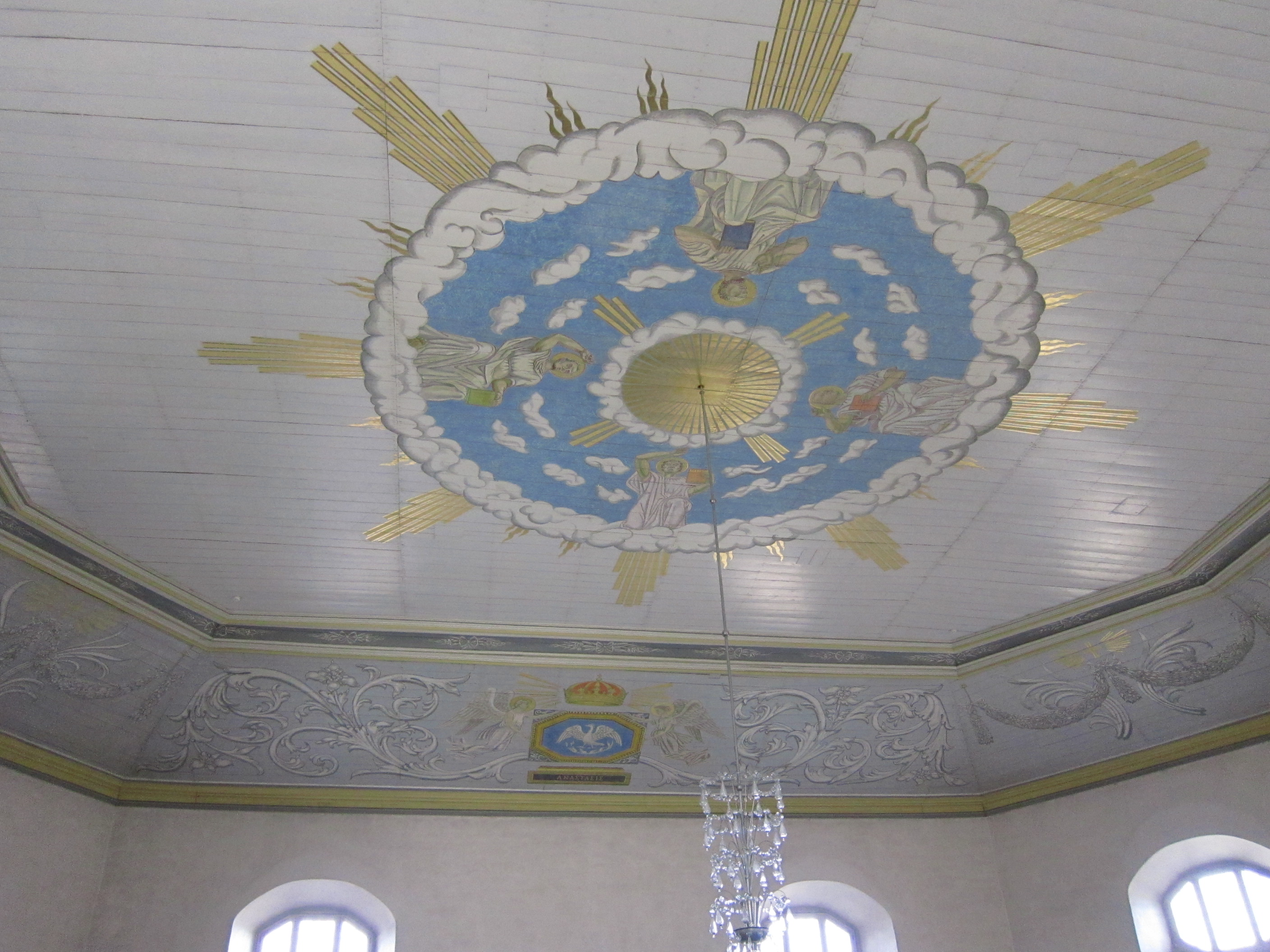
The wide, decorated ceiling of Vang Church, no supporting columns

During the period from 1750 to 1830, about 230 churches were constructed in Norway. Among these, 35 were octagonal, 62 were long churches (single nave hall church) and 110 were given a cruciform floor plan. During this period, 17 octagonal churches appeared in the Diocese of Nidaros (all of Norway north of the Dovrefjell mountains). Later, these church designs became popular in rural Agder.

Muri in 1975 made a survey of existing churches built since Christianity was introduced in Norway until World War II:

Type of building	Count
Stave church	31
Medieval stone church	157
Long church	850
Cruciform	190
Octagonal	74
Y-shape	5
Square floor plan	15

In addition to the existing churches listed, some octagonal churches were demolished and replaced. Previous octagonal churches (year built-year dismantled), included in statistics:

- Vrådal Church in Kviteseid Municipality (1686-1887)
- Øye Church in Surnadal Municipality (1724-1871)
- Undrumsdal Church in Tønsberg Municipality (1730-1882)
- Hopen Church in Smøla Municipality (1749-1891)
- Flekkefjord Church in Flekkefjord Municipality (1790-1843), a new octagonal church was built in 1833
- Hareid Church in Hareid Municipality (1806-1877), built by Elling Olsson Walbøe, used as a model for Haram Church in Haram Municipality

Number of buildings by county

County (current division)	Current buildings	Including perished buildings
Oslo	1	1
Innlandet	13	14
Buskerud	2	2
Vestfold	1	2
Telemark	1	2
Agder	11	11
Rogaland	1	1
Vestland	5	5
Møre og Romsdal	16	19
Trøndelag	13	13
Nordland	9	9
Troms	1	1
Finnmark	2	2

Some of the largest churches in Norway are octagonal:

- Røros Church 1640 seats
- Trinity Church (Oslo) 1000 seats (originally 1200), Greek cross and octagon combined
- Vang Church 1000 seats
- Sør-Fron Church 750 seats
- Tynset Church 700 seats (the largest log church)
- Flekkefjord Church 650 seats
- Stor-Elvdal Church 600 seats
- Dolstad Church 500 seats

== List of octagonal churches ==
List of existing buildings by year of construction and county (list may be incomplete).

Building	Year	Location	County	Picture	Architect	Notes
Trinity Church	1858	Oslo Municipality	Oslo		Chateauneuf/von Hanno	cruciform with octagon, brick masonry
Tynset Church	1795	Tynset Municipality	Innlandet		Ellingsen	
Vang Church	1810	Hamar Municipality	Innlandet		Pihl	Aspaas master builder. Masonry
Stor-Elvdal Church	1821	Stor-Elvdal Municipality	Innlandet		Aspaas	
Tolga Church	1840	Tolga Municipality	Innlandet		Aspaas, Rasmus/Berg, John E.	
Åsmarka Church	1859	Ringsaker Municipality	Innlandet		Nordan	
Tangen Church	1862	Stange Municipality	Innlandet		Grosch	
Mo Church	1864	Nord-Odal Municipality	Innlandet		Grosch	
Sør-Fron Church	1792	Sør-Fron Municipality	Innlandet		Aspaas?	Aspaas master builder. Masonry
Åmot Church	1823	Nordre Land Municipality	Innlandet		Pihl	
Jevnaker Church	1834	Jevnaker Municipality	Innlandet		Pihl/Aspaas?	
Rogne Church	1857	Øystre Slidre Municipality	Innlandet		Grosch	
Svatsum Church	1860	Gausdal Municipality	Innlandet		Friis	
Nordberg Church	1864	Skjåk Municipality	Innlandet		Nordan	
Bøverdal Church	1864	Lom Municipality	Innlandet		Rusten	
Nes Church	1860	Ringerike Municipality	Buskerud		Grosch	
Hval Church	1862	Ringerike Municipality	Buskerud		Grosch	drawing as Rogne?
Langestrand Church	1818	Larvik Municipality	Vestfold		Lind	
Kilebygda Church	1859	Skien Municipality	Telemark		Grosch	
Årdal Church	1828	Bygland Municipality	Agder		Syrtveit	
Hornnes Church	1828	Evje og Hornnes Municipality	Agder		Forsæth	model for several churches in rural Agder
Mykland Church	1832	Froland Municipality	Agder		Olsen	
Hylestad Church	1838	Valle Municipality	Agder		Syrtveit	«Linstow type»
Sandnes Church	1844	Bygland Municipality	Agder		Syrtveit	prototype by Linstow
Herefoss Church	1865	Birkenes Municipality	Agder		Nordan	
Sandnes Chapel	1949	Bygland Municipality	Agder		Tallaksen	
Hægeland Church	1830	Vennesla Municipality	Agder		Syrtveit (master builder)	Hornnes Church model
Flekkefjord Church	1833	Flekkefjord Municipality	Agder		Linstow	
Kvinesdal Church	1837	Kvinesdal Municipality	Agder		Linstow	
Hægebostad Church	1844	Hægebostad Municipality	Agder		Grosch, Hald	
Hidra Church	1854	Flekkefjord Municipality	Agder		Grosch	cruciform with octagon
Skåre Church	1858	Haugesund Municipality	Rogaland		Grosch	
Samnanger Church	1851	Samnanger Municipality	Vestland		Grønning	basilica shape
Innvik Church	1822	Stryn Municipality	Vestland		Walbøe	
Loen Church	1838	Stryn Municipality	Vestland		unknown?	
Lavik Church	1865	Høyanger Municipality	Vestland		Grosch	
Tjugum Church	1868	Sogndal Municipality	Vestland		Grosch	
Norddal Church	1782	Fjord Municipality	Møre og Romsdal		Døving (master buileder)	Hospitalskirken model
Old Stordal Church	1789	Fjord Municipality	Møre og Romsdal		Tønder (parish priest)	
Leikanger Church	1807	Herøy Municipality	Møre og Romsdal		Walbøe	relocated 1873
Sandøy Church	1812	Ålesund Municipality	Møre og Romsdal		unknown	
Romfo Church	1821	Sunndal Municipality	Møre og Romsdal		Tofte (master builder)	
Tresfjord Church	1828	Vestnes Municipality	Møre og Romsdal		Kroken	
Grytten Church	1829	Rauma Municipality	Møre og Romsdal		Aspaas?	
Aukra Church	1835	Aukra Municipality	Møre og Romsdal		unknown	
Stranda Church	1838	Stranda Municipality	Møre og Romsdal		unknown	
Haram Church	1838	Haram Municipality	Møre og Romsdal		unknown	
Geiranger Church	1842	Stranda Municipality	Møre og Romsdal		Klipe	
Ålvundeid Church	1848	Sunndal Municipality	Møre og Romsdal		Tofte (master builder)	
Ulstein Church	1849	Ulstein Municipality	Møre og Romsdal		Wraaman (parish priest)	relocated 1878
Kleive Church	1858	Molde Municipality	Møre og Romsdal		unknown	prototype by Grosch?
Eresfjord Church	1869	Molde Municipality	Møre og Romsdal		unknown	possibly based on prototype
St. Sunniva Church	1957	Molde Municipality	Møre og Romsdal			catholic
Hospitalskirken (Trondhjem Hospital)	1705	Trondheim Municipality	Trøndelag		Hempel	
Bakke Church	1715	Trondheim Municipality	Trøndelag		Hempel	
Røros Church	1784	Røros Municipality	Trøndelag		Neumann(?)	Aspaas/Ellingsen (master masons)
Klæbu Church	1790	Trondheim Municipality	Trøndelag		Forsæth	
Støren Church	1817	Midtre Gauldal Municipality	Trøndelag		Aspaas/Claus Forsæth	
Hemne Church	1817	Heim Municipality	Trøndelag		«Jakob Kirkebygger»	
Buvik Church	1819	Skaun Municipality	Trøndelag	photo: Wilse (1927)/Museum of Cultural History	unknown?	Aspaas or Forsæth?
Vinje Church	1824	Heim Municipality	Trøndelag		Konstum	
Lønset Chapel	1863	Oppdal Municipality	Trøndelag		Rønningen	
Titran Chapel	1873	Frøya Municipality	Trøndelag		unknown	originally gospel hall
Vinne Church	1817	Verdal Municipality	Trøndelag	photo: Kj. Lie	unknown?	«Oluff kirkebygger»?
Otterøy Church	1858	Namsos Municipality	Trøndelag		Grosch	
Kristi krybbe Church	1959	Røyrvik Municipality	Trøndelag		Helland-Hansen	private, Røyrvik
Vassås Church	1733	Bindal Municipality	Nordland		Ryjord	
Dolstad Church	1735	Vefsn Municipality	Nordland		Bech (master builder)	cruciform with octagon
Ankenes Church	1842	Narvik Municipality	Nordland		Julin	
Dverberg Church	1843	Andøy Municipality	Nordland		Grosch	
Hadsel Church	1824	Hadsel Municipality	Nordland		unknown	
Hemnes Church	1872	Hemnes Municipality	Nordland		Eckhoff	cruciform with octagon
Rødøy Church	1885	Rødøy Municipality	Nordland		Grenstad, J.P. Digre	cruciform/octagon
Digermulen Church	1951	Vågan Municipality	Nordland		Nygaard & Schyberg	concrete
Røssvoll Church	1953	Rana Municipality	Nordland		Nygård & Skyberg	
Bardu Church	1829	Bardu Municipality	Troms		Lundberg	copy of Tynset Church
Hasvik Church	1951	Hasvik Municipality	Finnmark		Hansteen	previous church burnt by occupant forces
Børselv Church	1958	Porsanger Municipality	Finnmark		Hansteen & Sørensen	

== Picture gallery ==
Churches with central tower
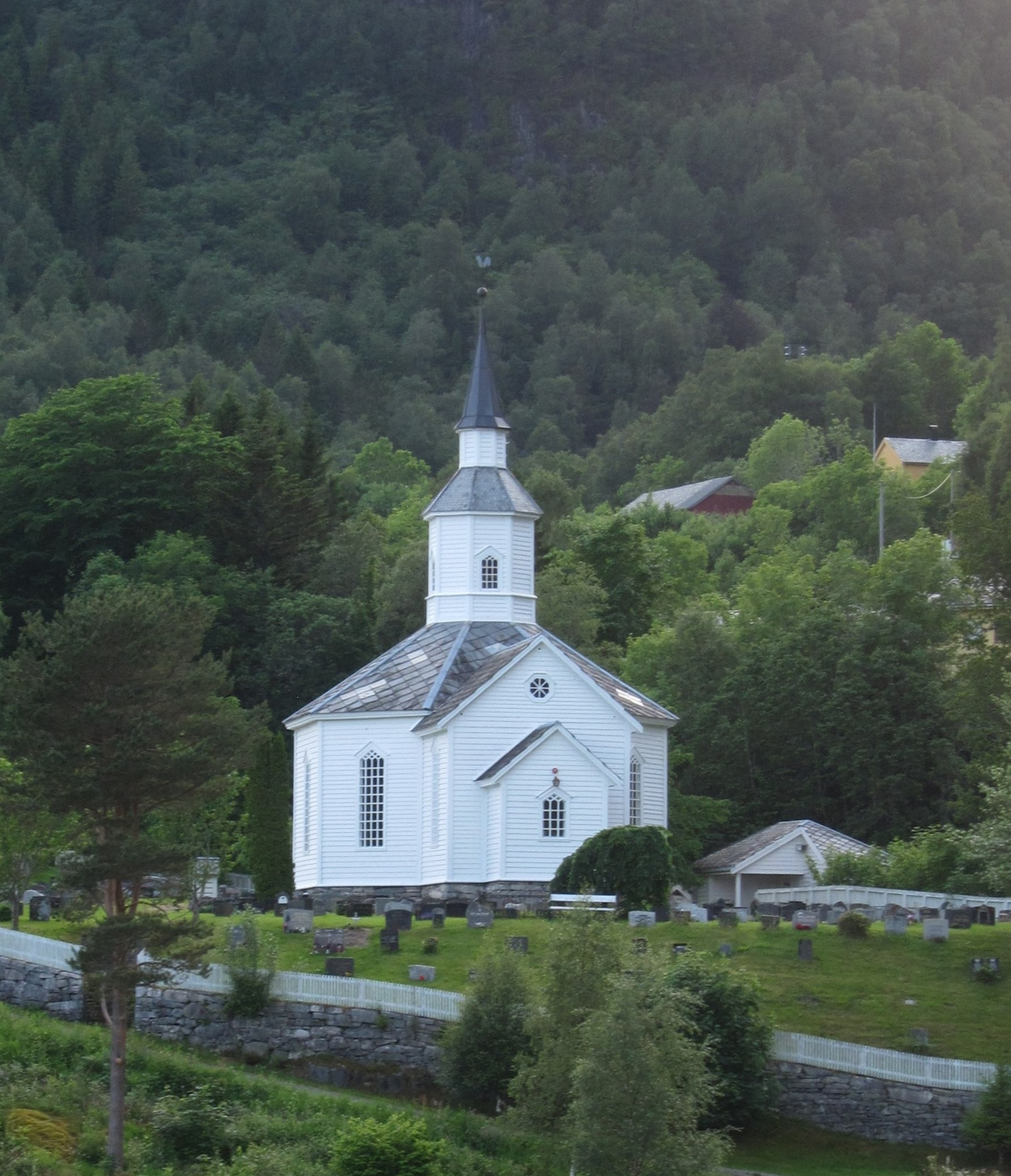
Lavik Church - the octagonal plan reflected in the tower.

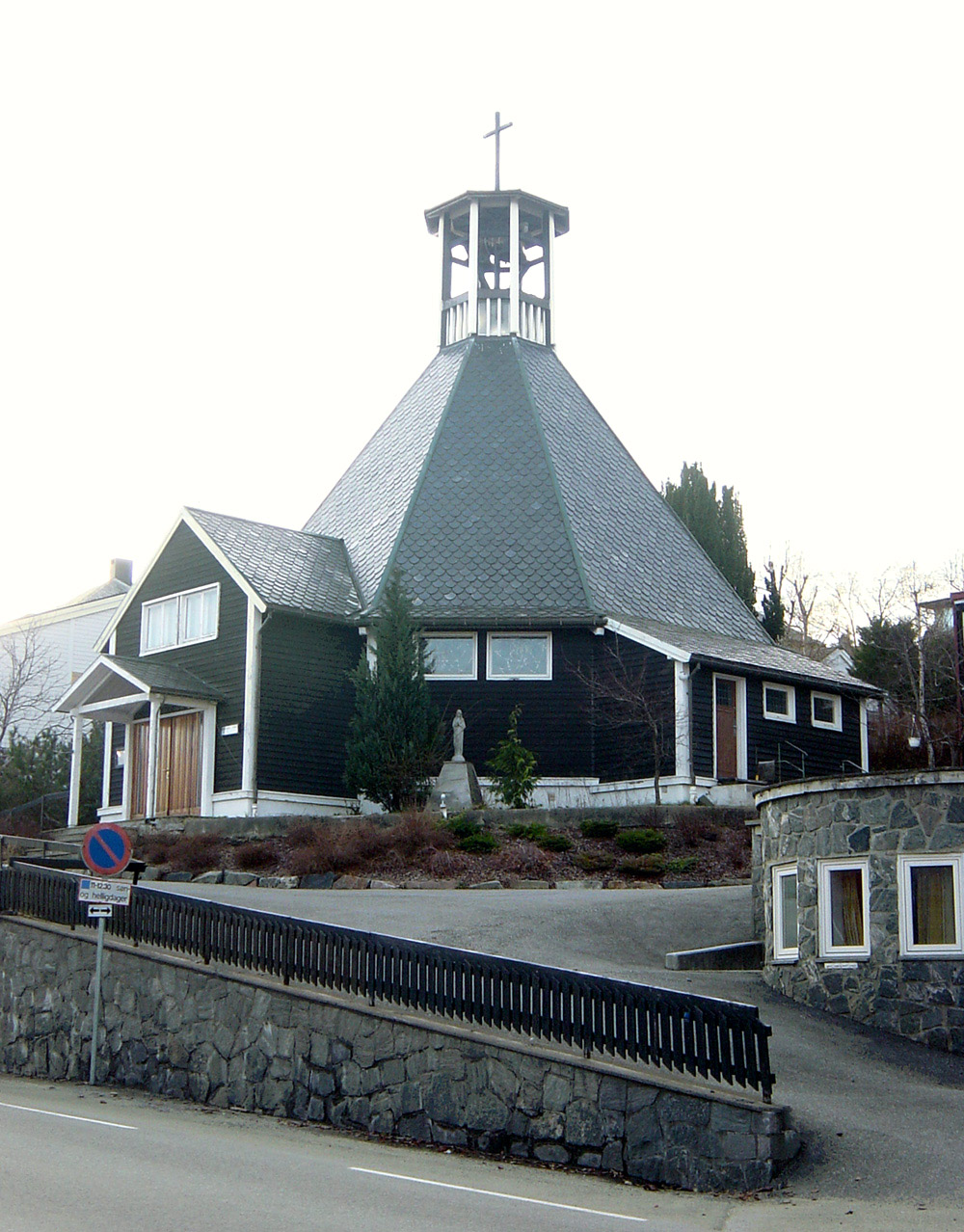
St. Sunniva catholic church in Molde (town)

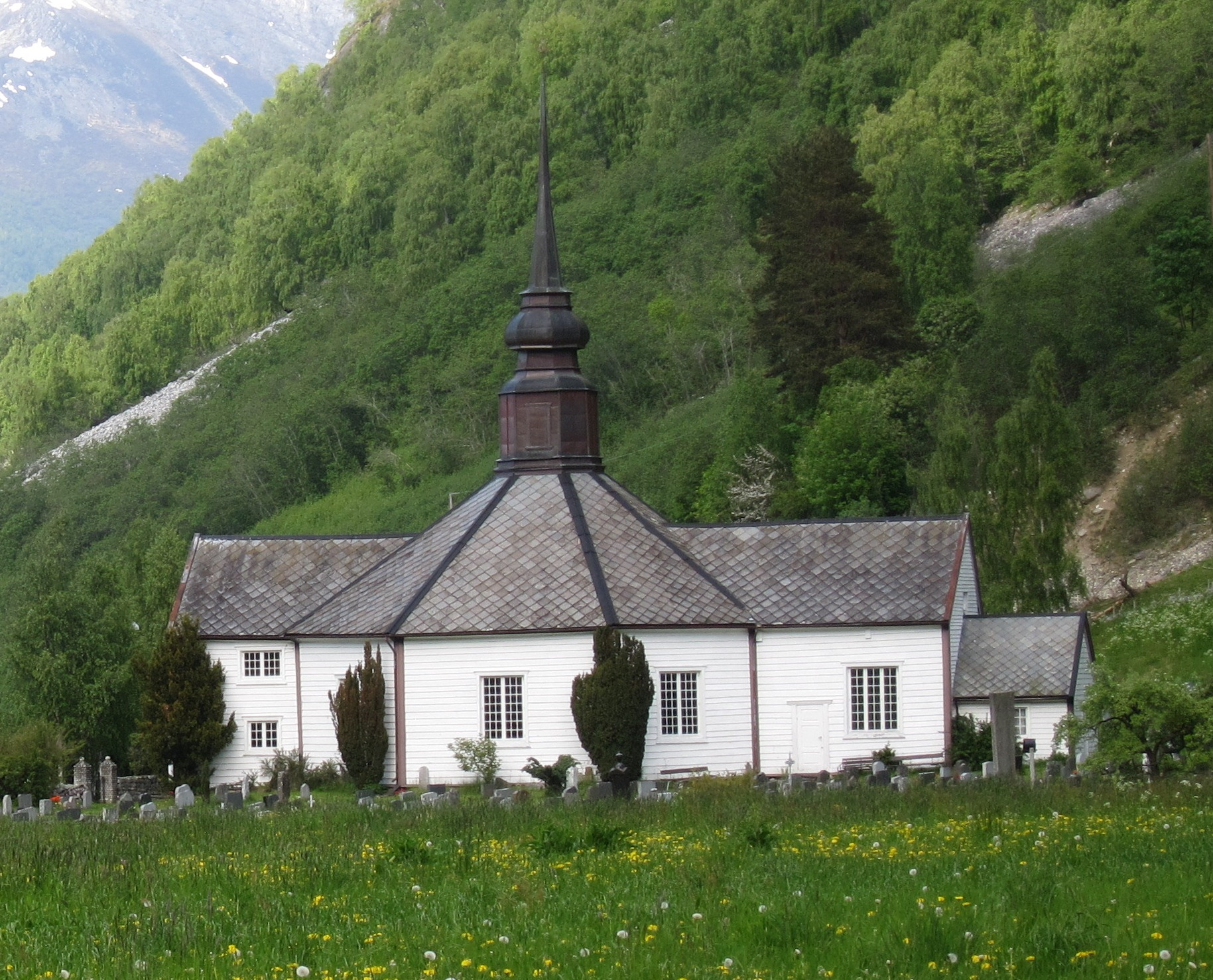
Norddal Church - first octagonal in Sunnmøre

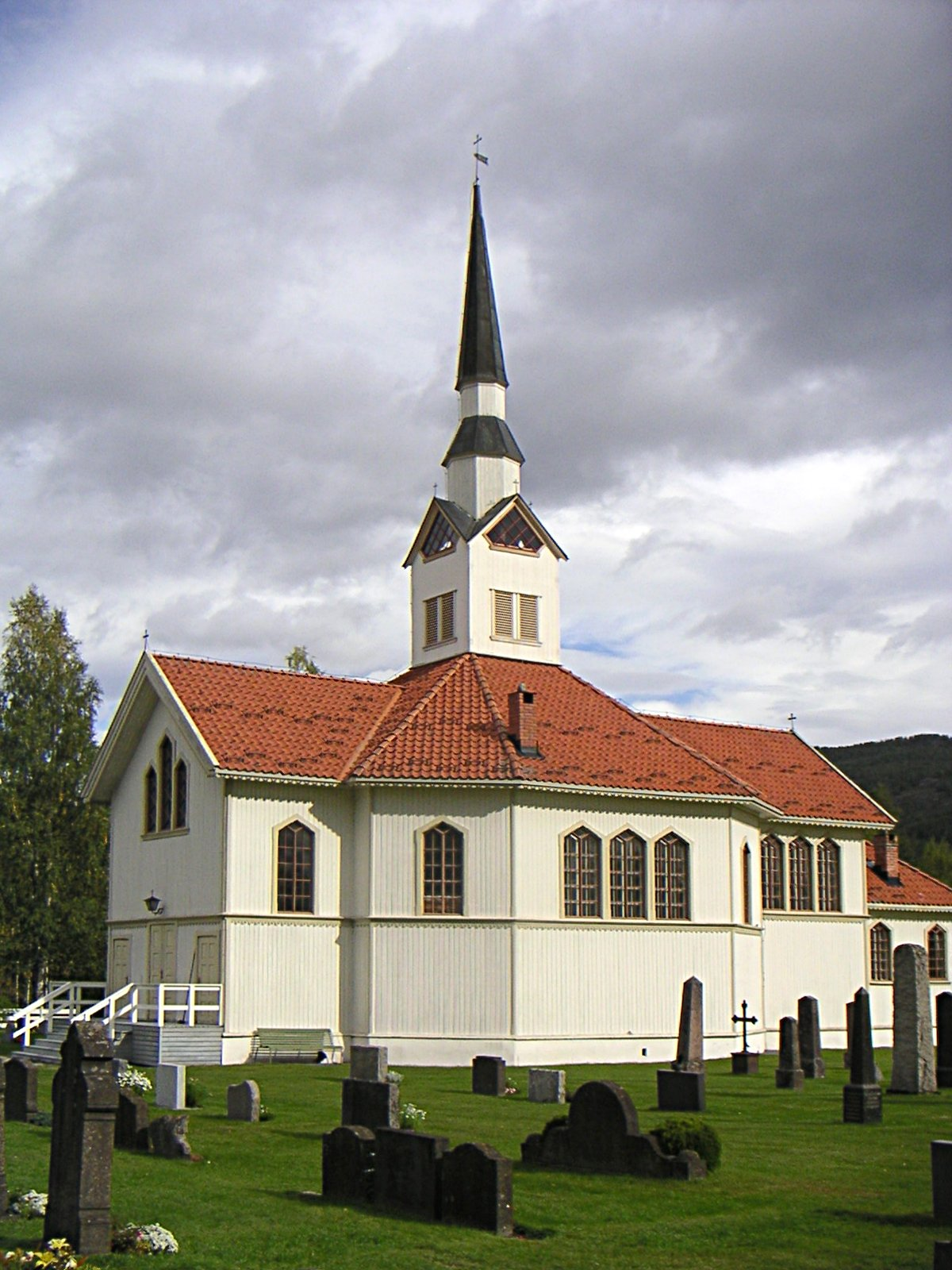
Nes Church at Ringerike Municipality
Credit: John Erling Blad

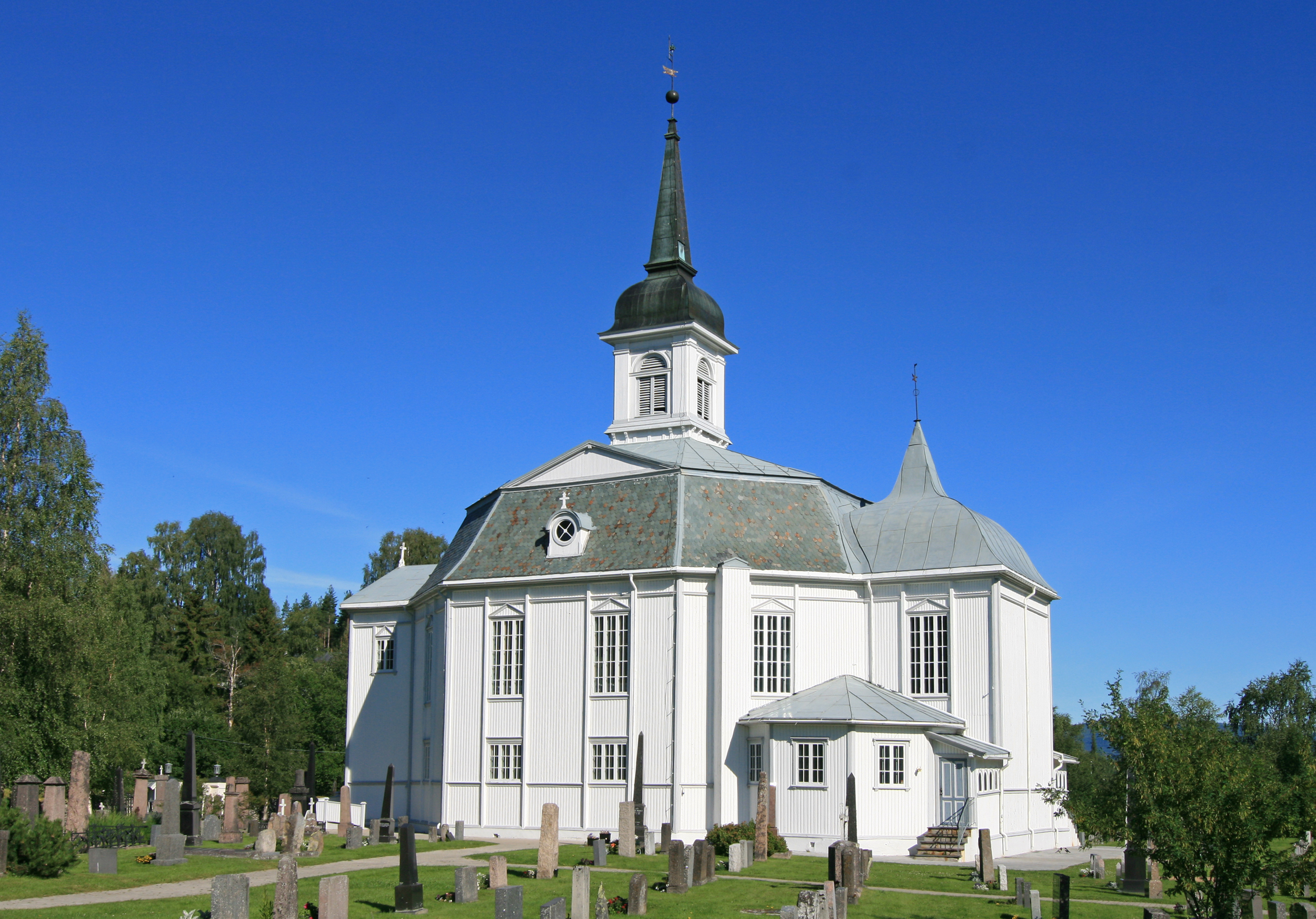
Stor-Elvdal Church in Stor-Elvdal Municipality

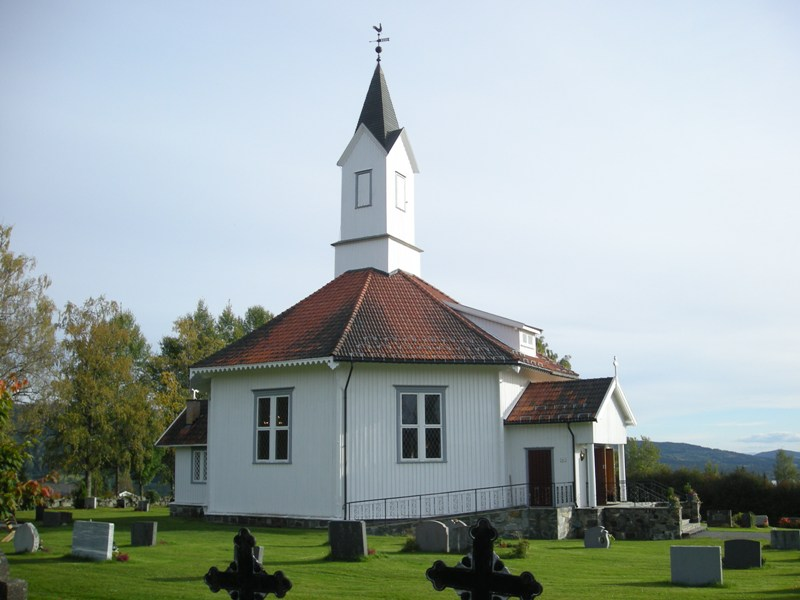
Åsmarka Church in Ringsaker Municipality, drawings by Jacob Wilhelm Nordan

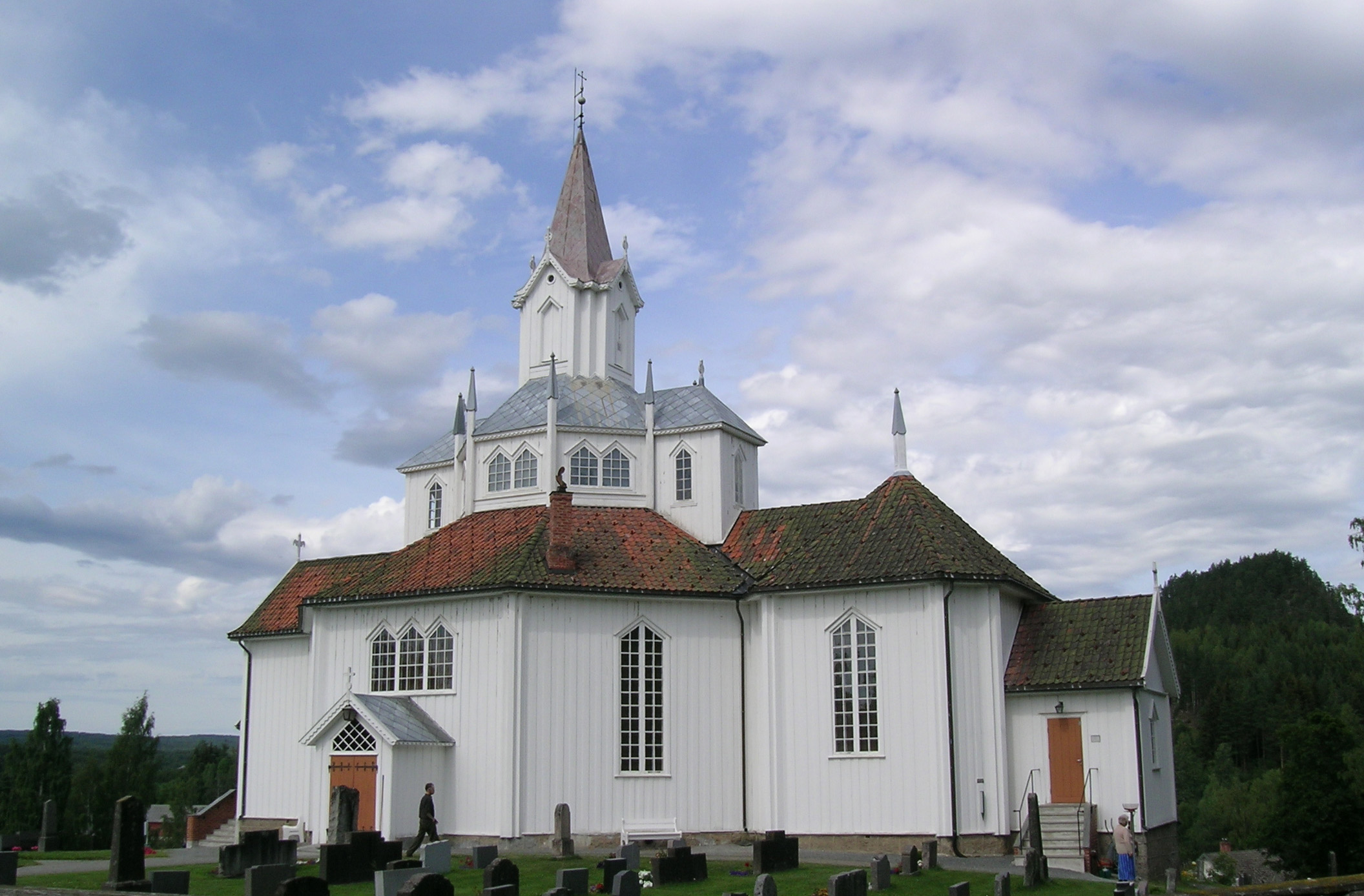
Tangen Church in Stange Municipality, drawn by Grosch

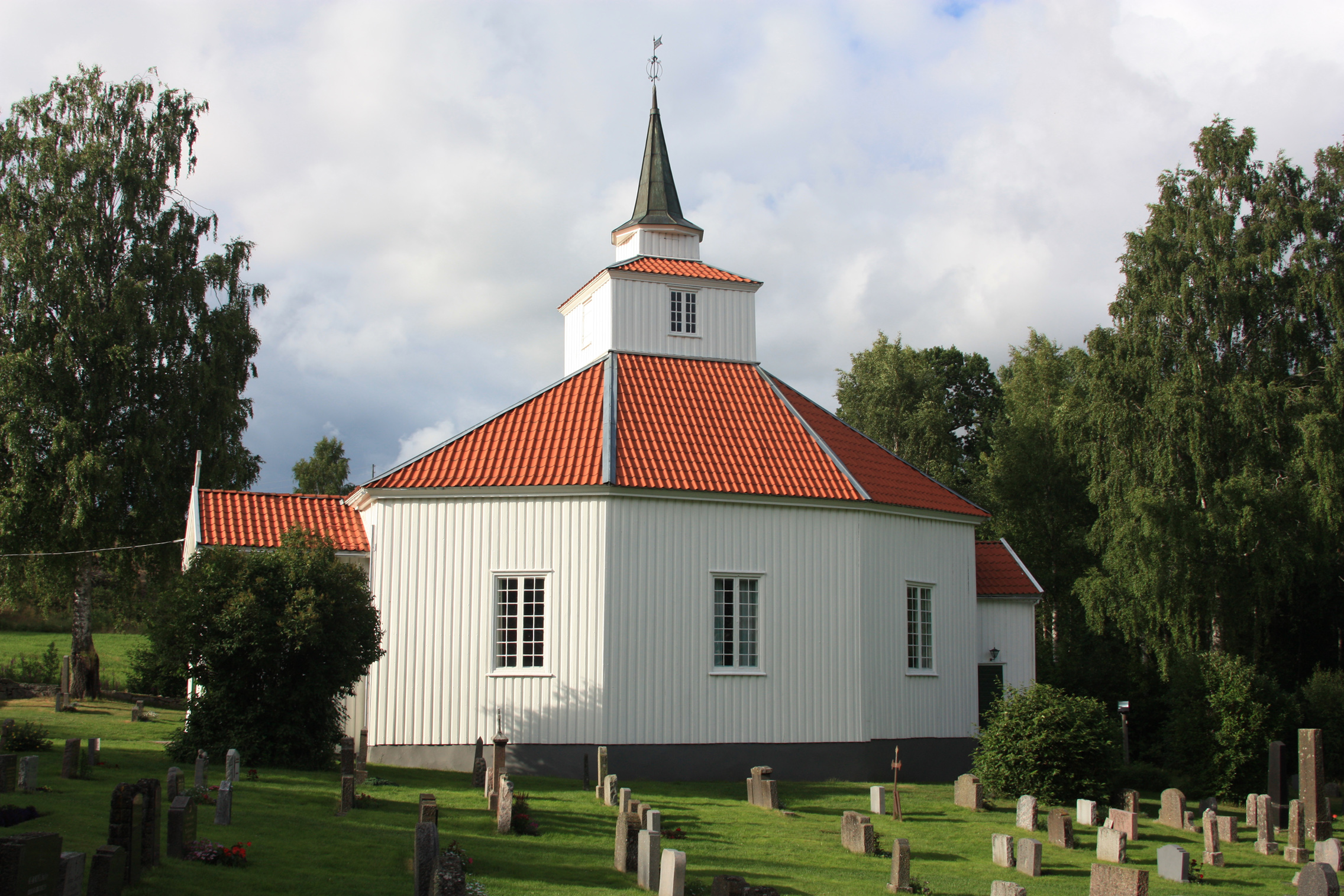
Mykland Church in Froland Municipality

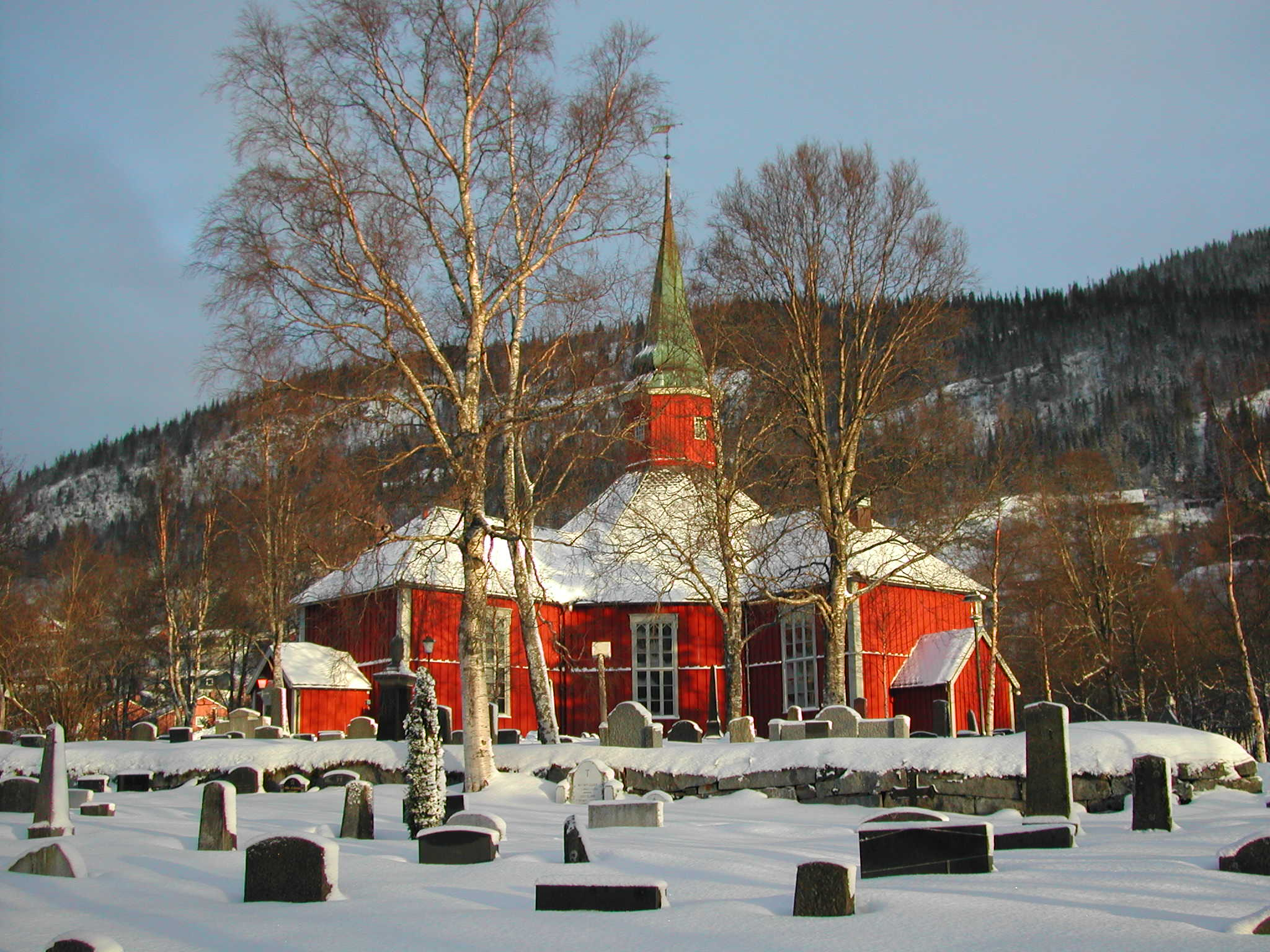
Dolstad Church combines octagonal and cruciform floorplan

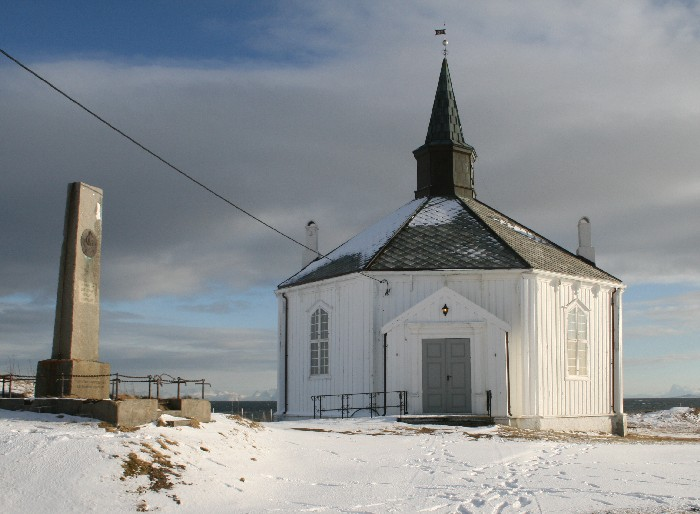
Dverberg Church drawn by Grosch

Asymmetrically placed tower
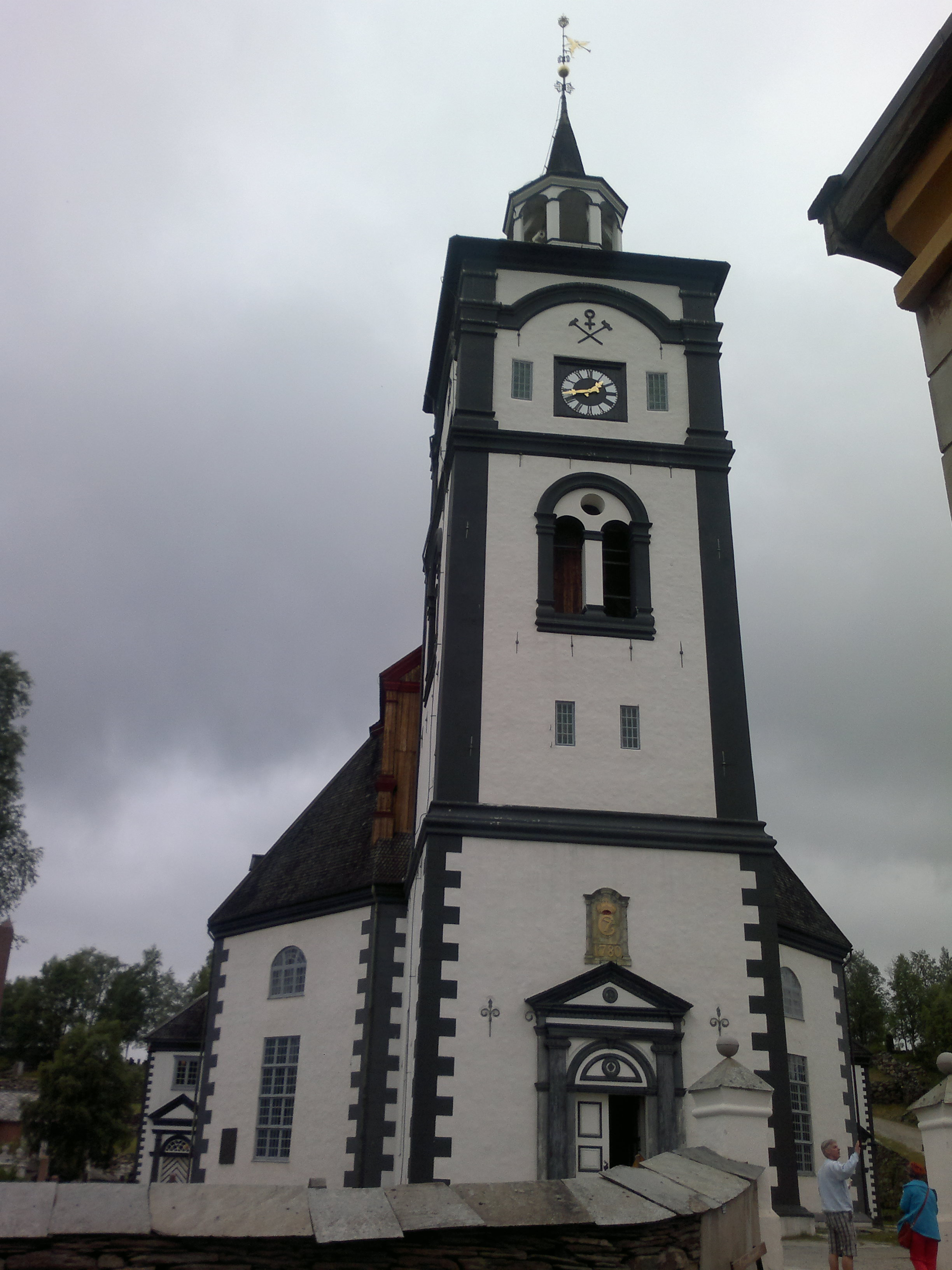
Røros Church is a landmark and the largest octagonal church in Norway.

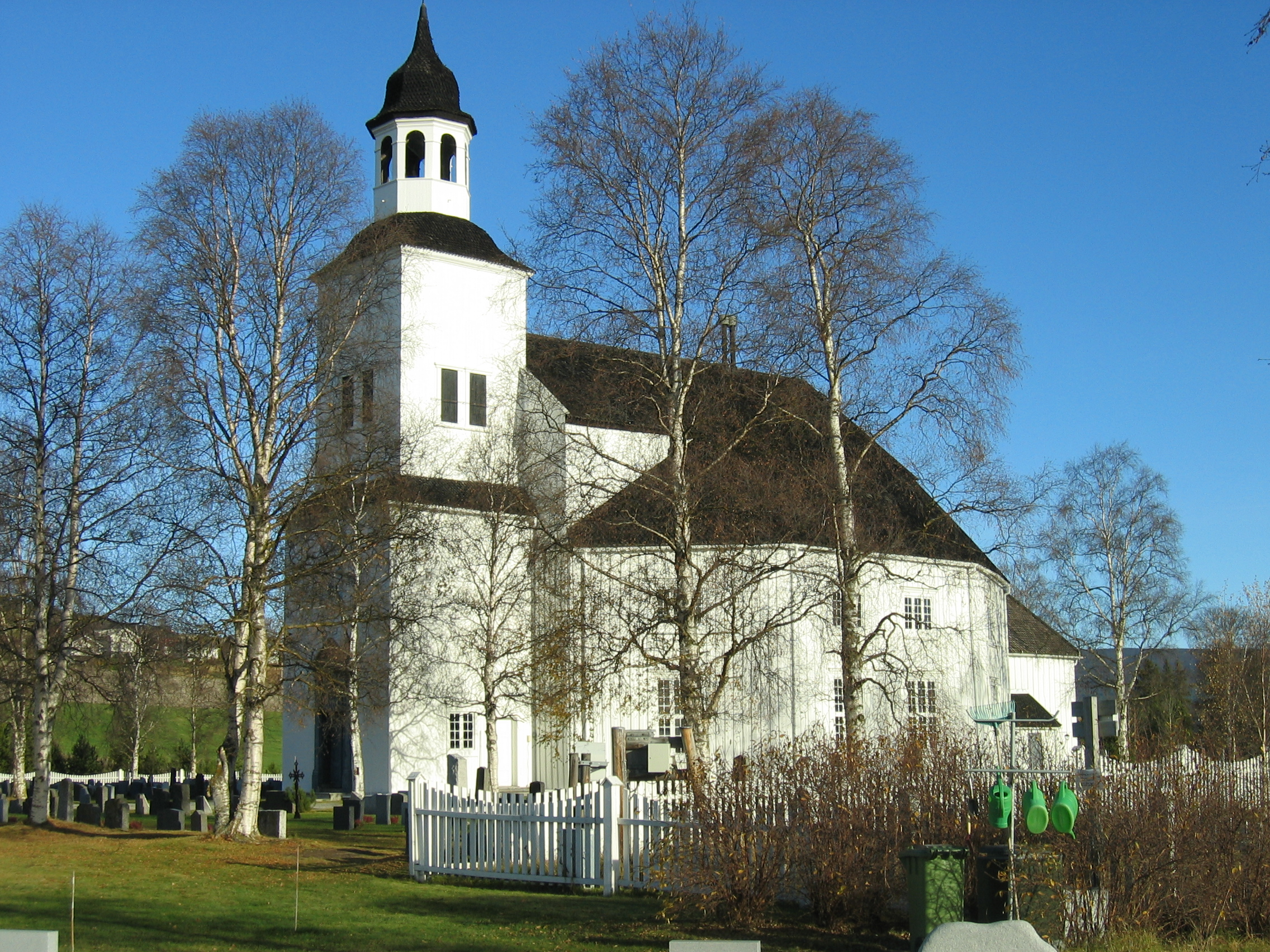
Tynset Church is the largest octagonal log church, design inspired by Røros Church.
Credit: PerPlex

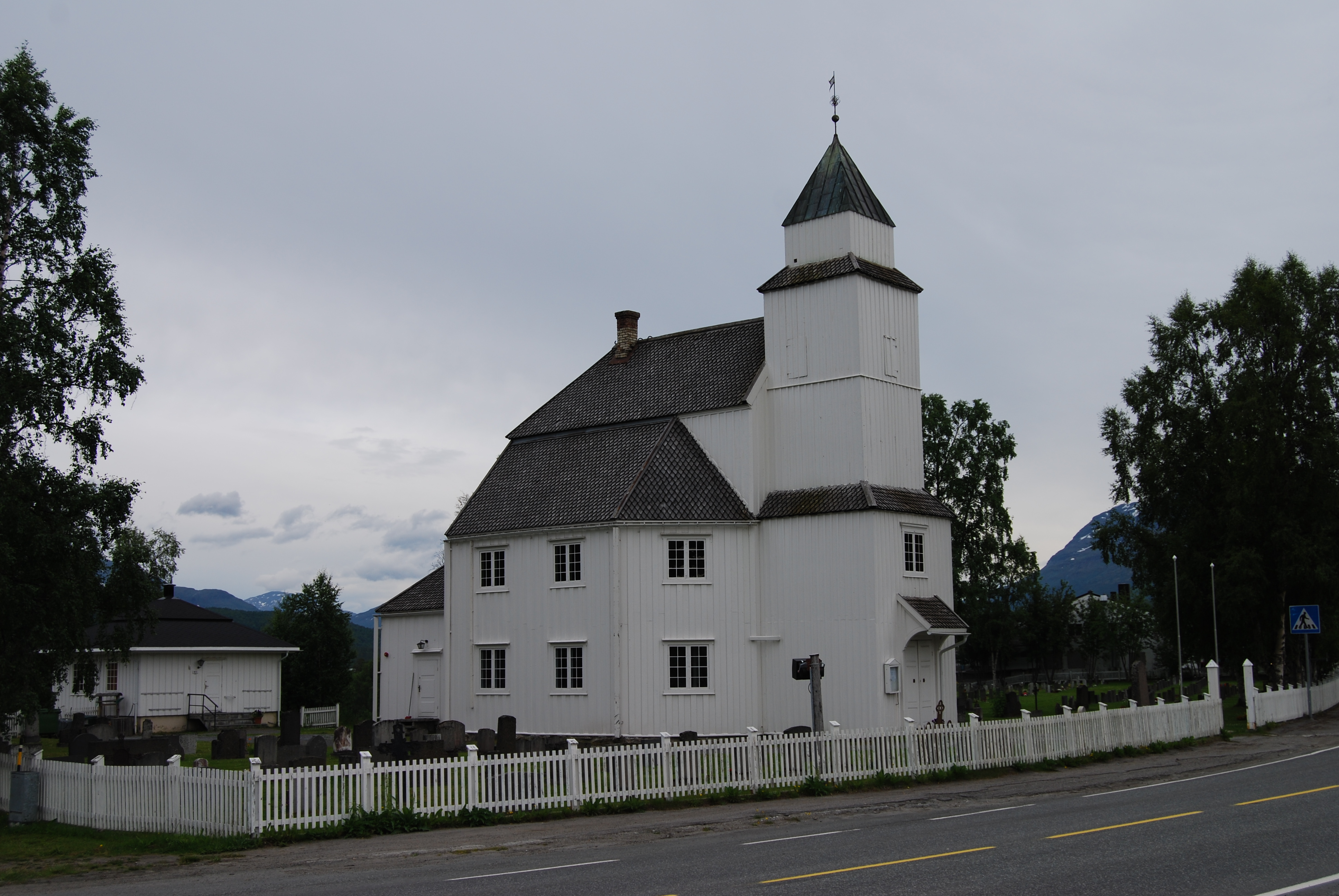
Bardu Church is a small copy of Tynset Church

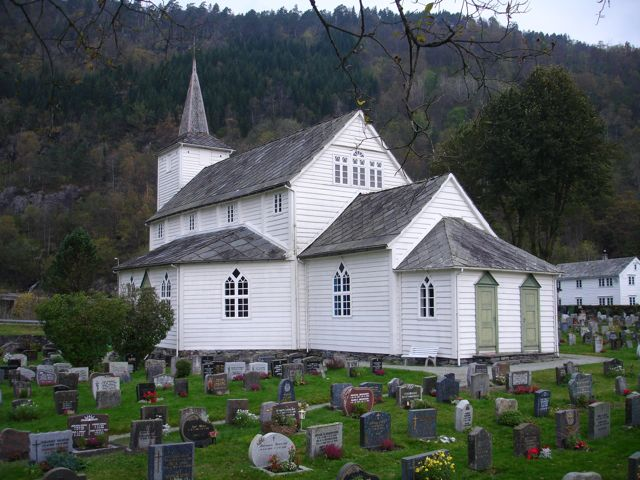
Samnanger Church combines basilical and octagonal floor plan
Credit: Per Magne Kjøde

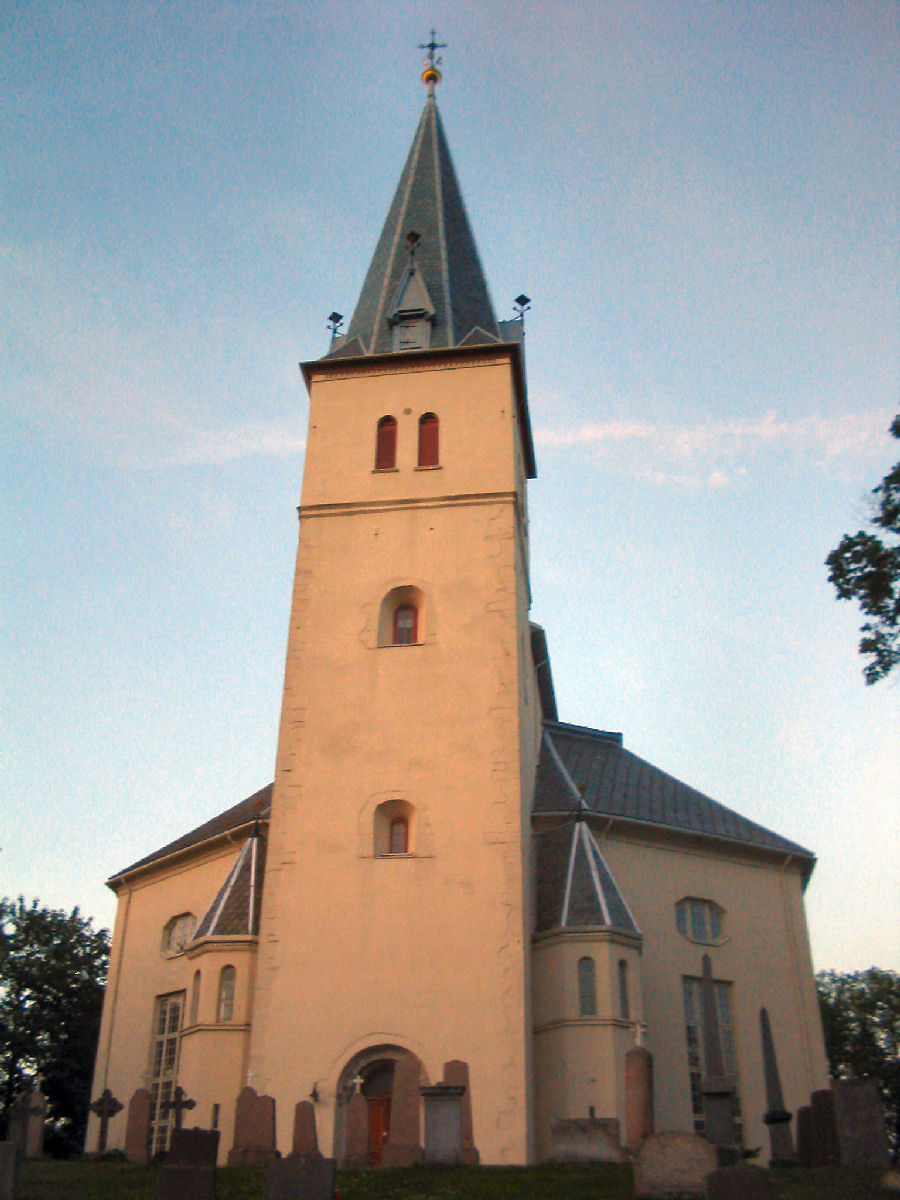
Vang Church in Hamar is a masonry building designed by Abraham Pihl
Credit: Torstein Frogner

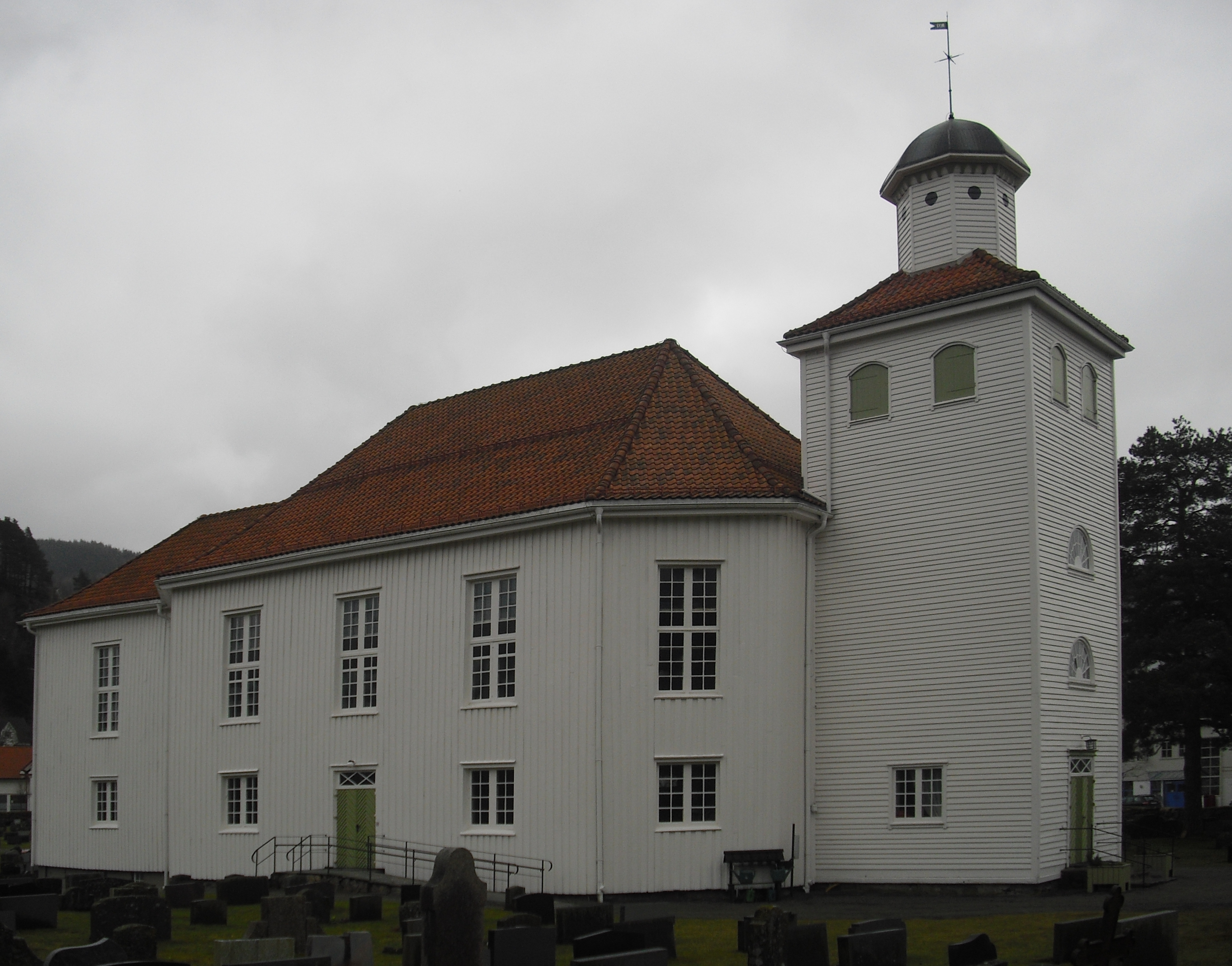
Kvinesdal Church, drawings by Linstow

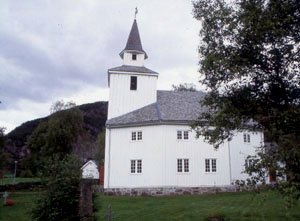
Hylestad Church in Valle Municipality
Credit: Helge Haugland

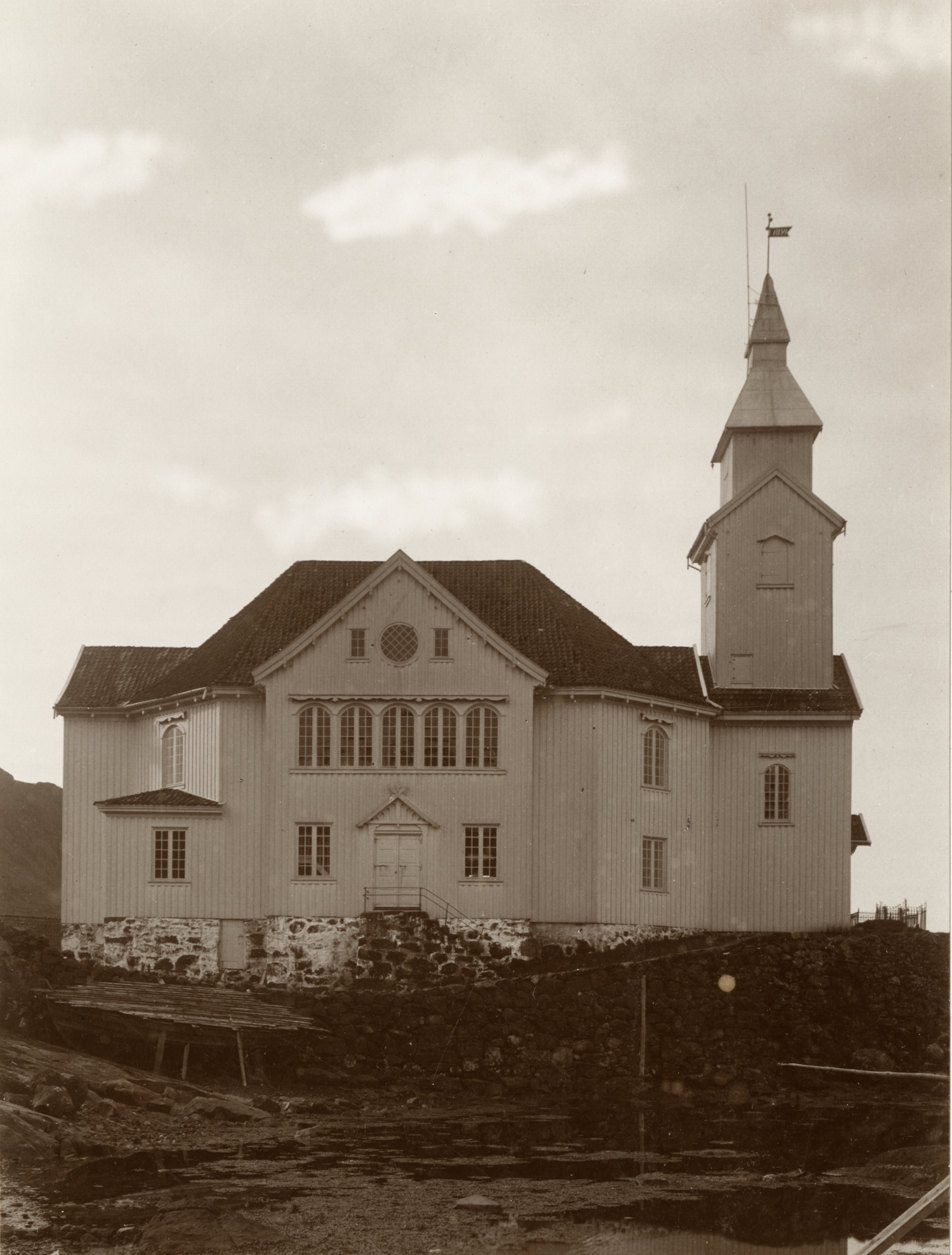
Hidra Church combines octagonal and cruciform shape
Credit: C. Christensen Thomhav/Riksantikvaren

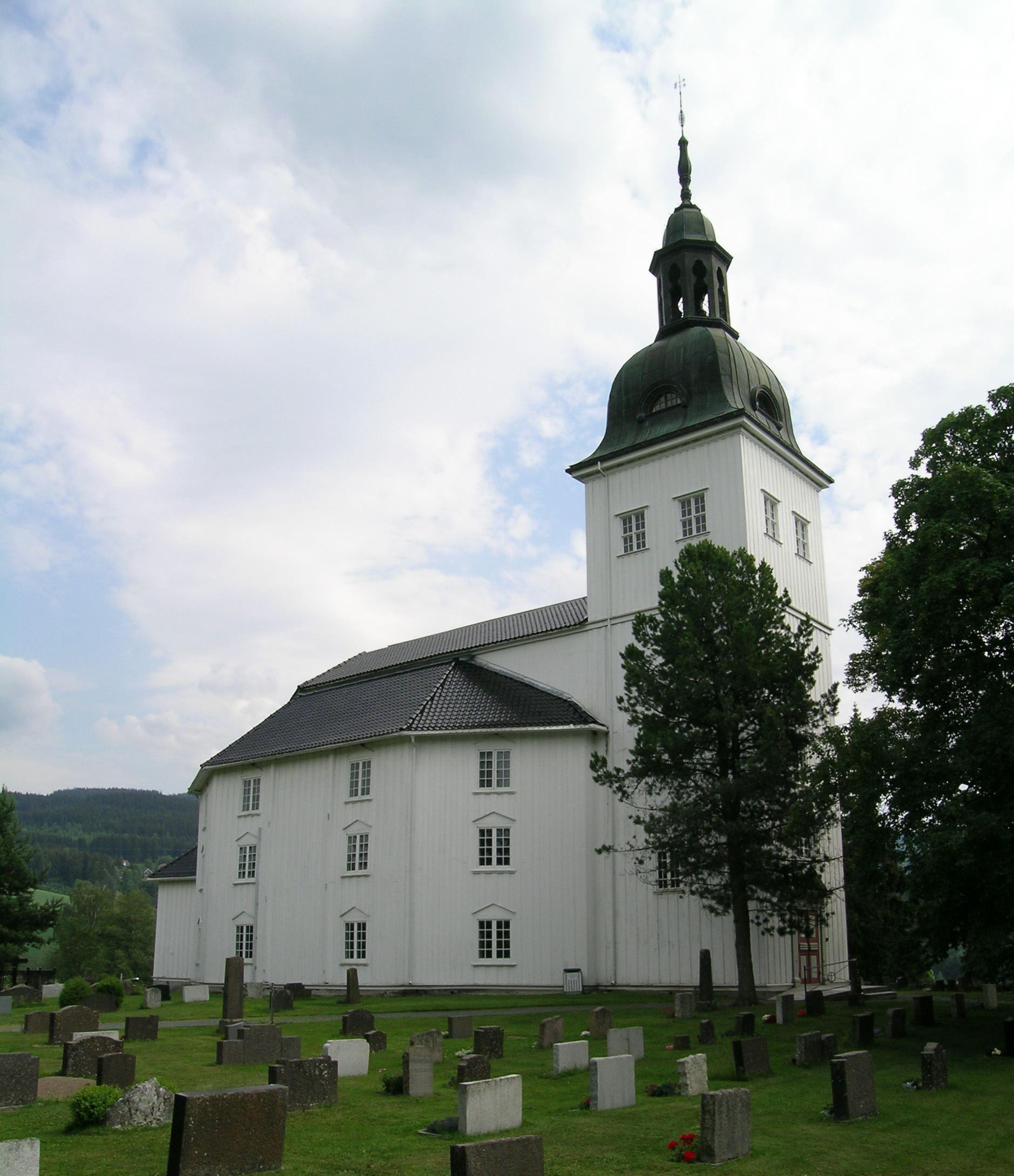
Jevnaker Church (drawings probably by Pihl)

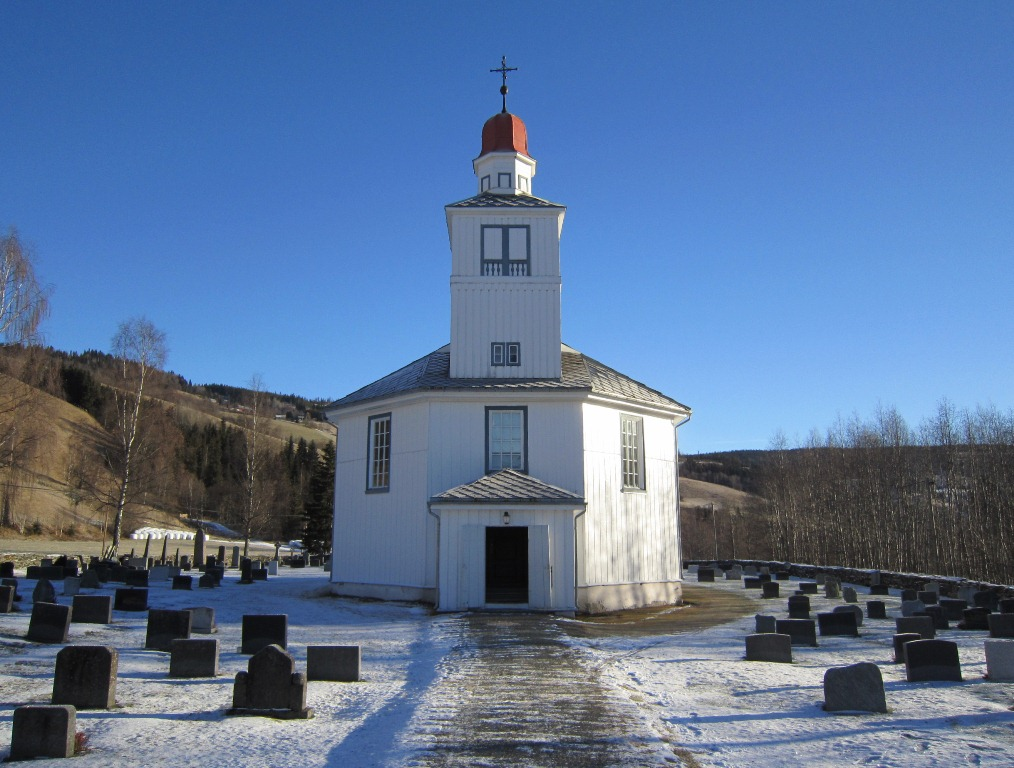
Svatsum Church in Gausdal Municipality designed by Otto Hjort Friis

Interiors
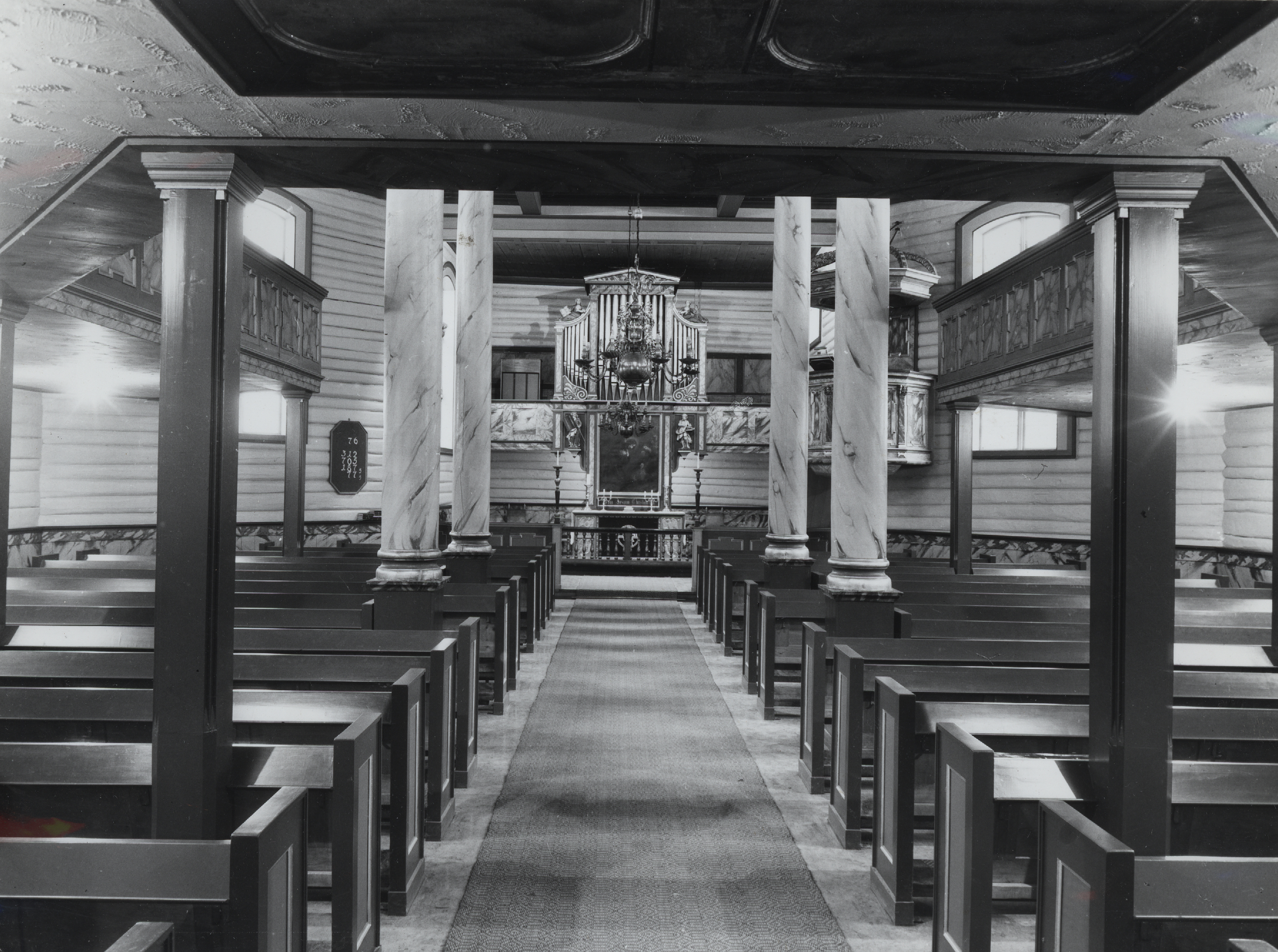
Bakke Church (1965 photo)

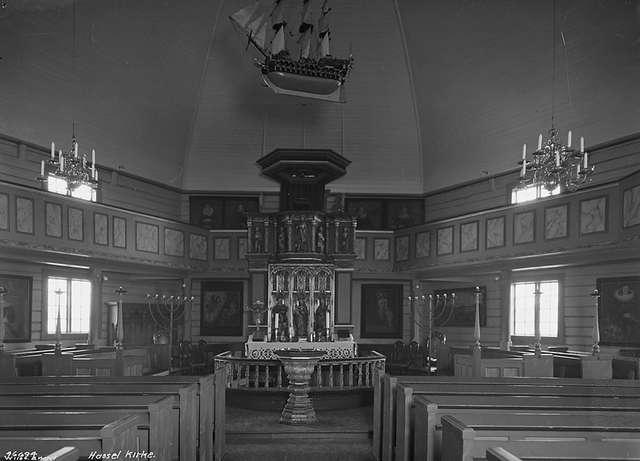
Hadsel Church with ship model (1938 photo)

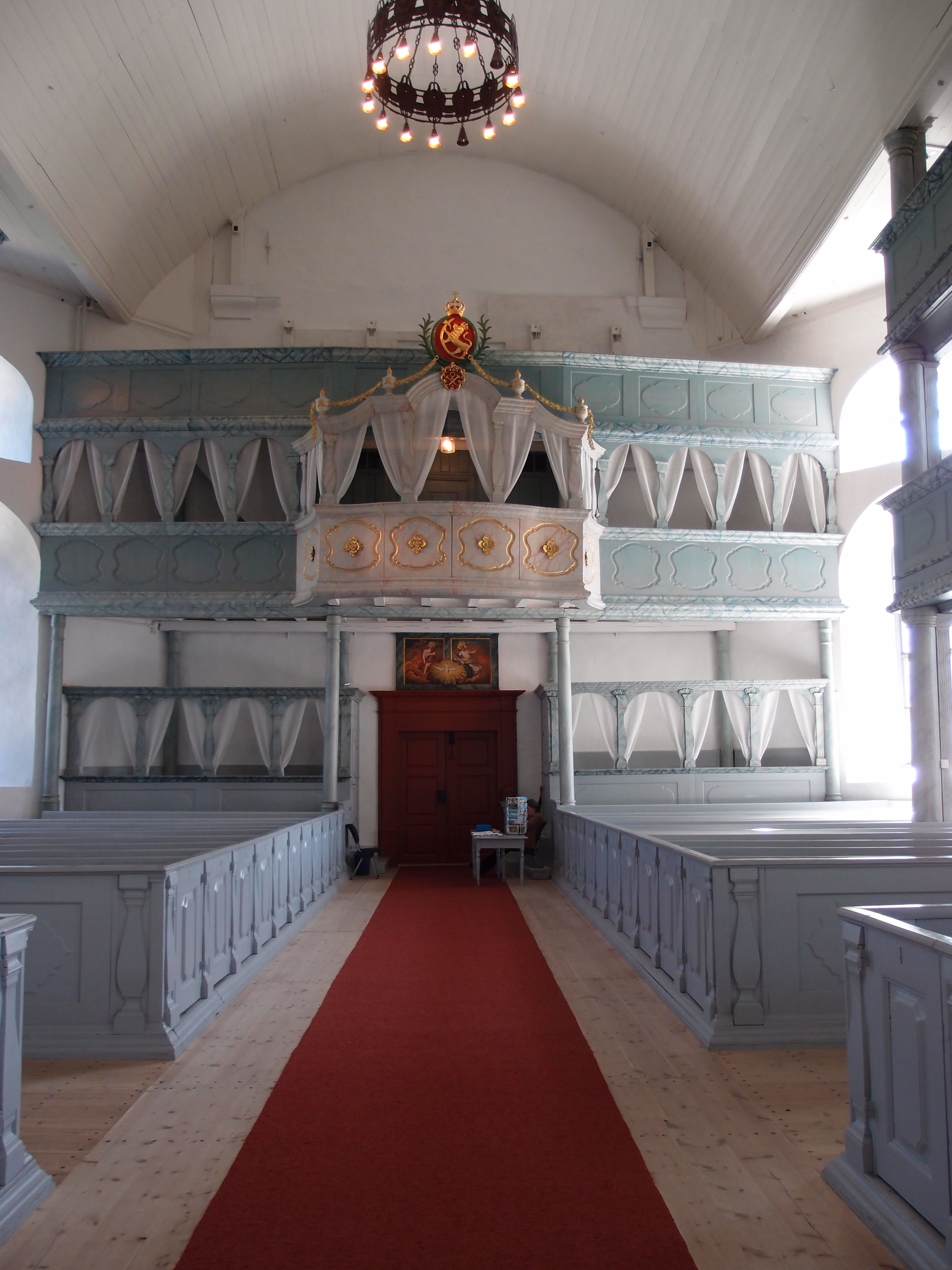
Røros Church with royal balcony and insignia of the copper mine
