= Elling Olsson Walbøe =

- Born: 26 May 1763; Ørskog, Norway
- Died: 13 December 1831 (aged 68)
- Occupations: Farmer and builder
- Known for: Member of the Norwegian Constituent Assembly in 1814

Elling Olsson Walbøe (26 May 1763 – 13 December 1831) was a Norwegian farmer, builder, and member of the Norwegian Constituent Assembly.

Walbøe was born at the Valbø farm in Ørskog parish in Romsdalen county, Norway. Later he bought the Nedre-Lande farm in the same parish. Walbøe was the builder of at least three octagonal churches: Leikanger Church in Møre og Romsdal and Innvik Church in Vestland, both of which still exist, as well as Hareid Church in Møre og Romsdal, which was demolished during the 1870s.

From 1799 to 1827, Walbøe served as a member of the Conciliation Commission (forlikskommissær) which mediated private disputes at Ørskog in Møre og Romsdal. Together with Hilmar Meincke Krohg and Jens Stub, he represented Romsdals amt at the Norwegian Constituent Assembly at Eidsvoll Manor in 1814. At the National Assembly he was primarily engaged in matters affecting the interests of farmers. In company with other farmers, he proposed to sell church-owned property in order to generate capital to establish a Norwegian Central Bank. He also supported a proposal to reintroduce a constitutional inheritance law. Valbo stood with the Union party (Unionspartiet), as did his fellow representative, Jens Stub.
