= Langestrand Church =

Church in Vestfold, Norway

- Langestrand kirke
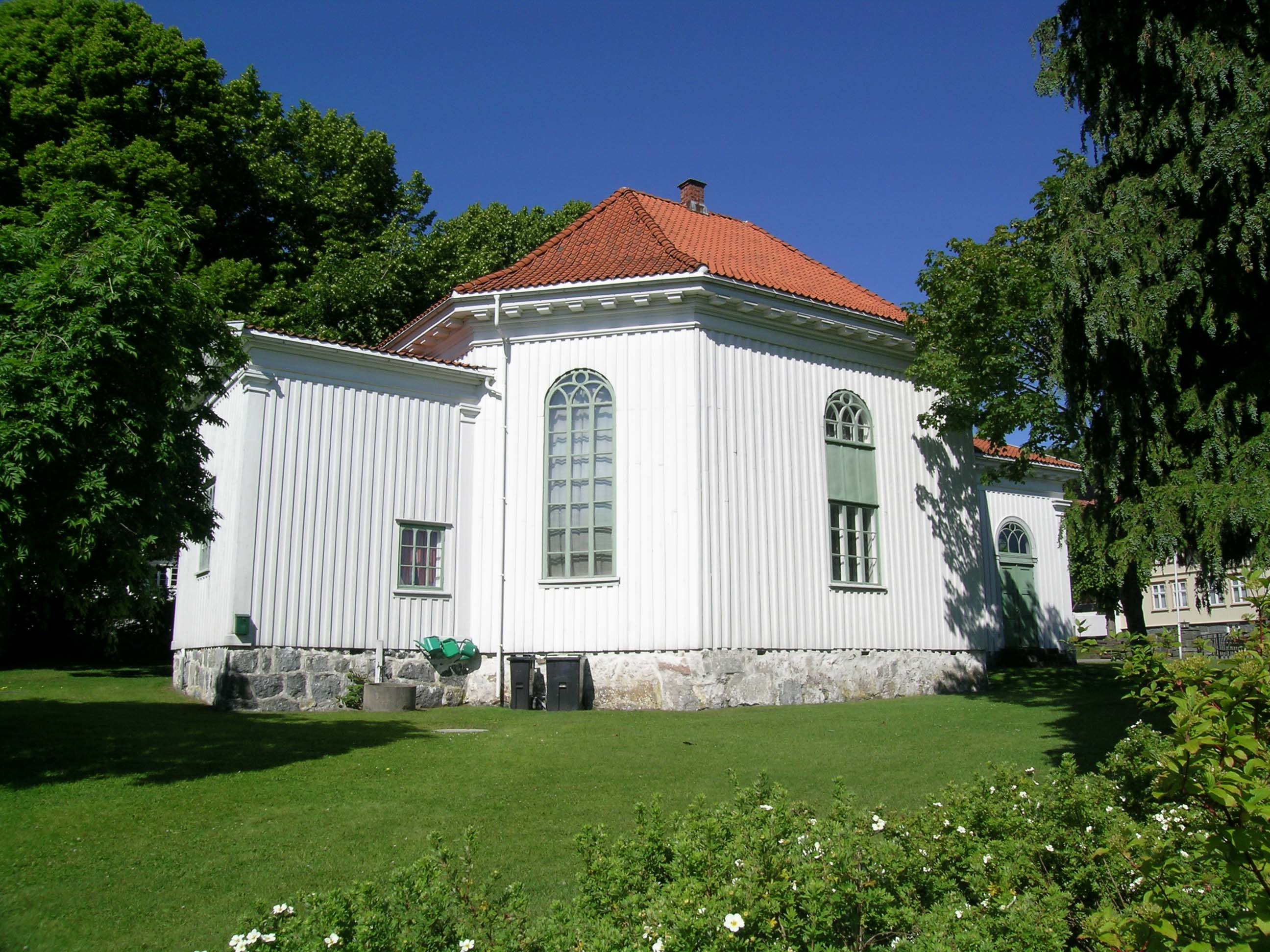
- View of the church
- Langestrand Church
- 59°02′59″N 10°00′37″E
- Location: Larvik Municipality, Vestfold
- Country: Norway
- Denomination: Church of Norway
- Previous denomination: Catholic Church
- Churchmanship: Evangelical Lutheran

History
- Status: Parish church
- Founded: 1642
- Consecrated: 1 Feb 1818

Architecture
- Functional status: Active
- Architect: Hans Christian Lind
- Architectural type: Long church
- Completed: 1818 (208 years ago)

Specifications
- Capacity: 180
- Materials: Wood

Administration
- Diocese: Tunsberg
- Deanery: Larvik prosti
- Parish: Larvik
- Norwegian Cultural Heritage Site
- Type: Church
- Status: Automatically protected
- ID: 84898

Langestrand Church (Norwegian: Langestrand kirke) is a parish church of the Church of Norway in Larvik Municipality in Vestfold county, Norway. It is located on the western edge of the town of Larvik. It is one of the churches for the Larvik parish which is part of the Larvik prosti (deanery) in the Diocese of Tunsberg. The white, wooden church was built in a octagonal design in 1818 using plans drawn up by the architect Hans Christian Lind. The church seats about 180 people.

== History ==
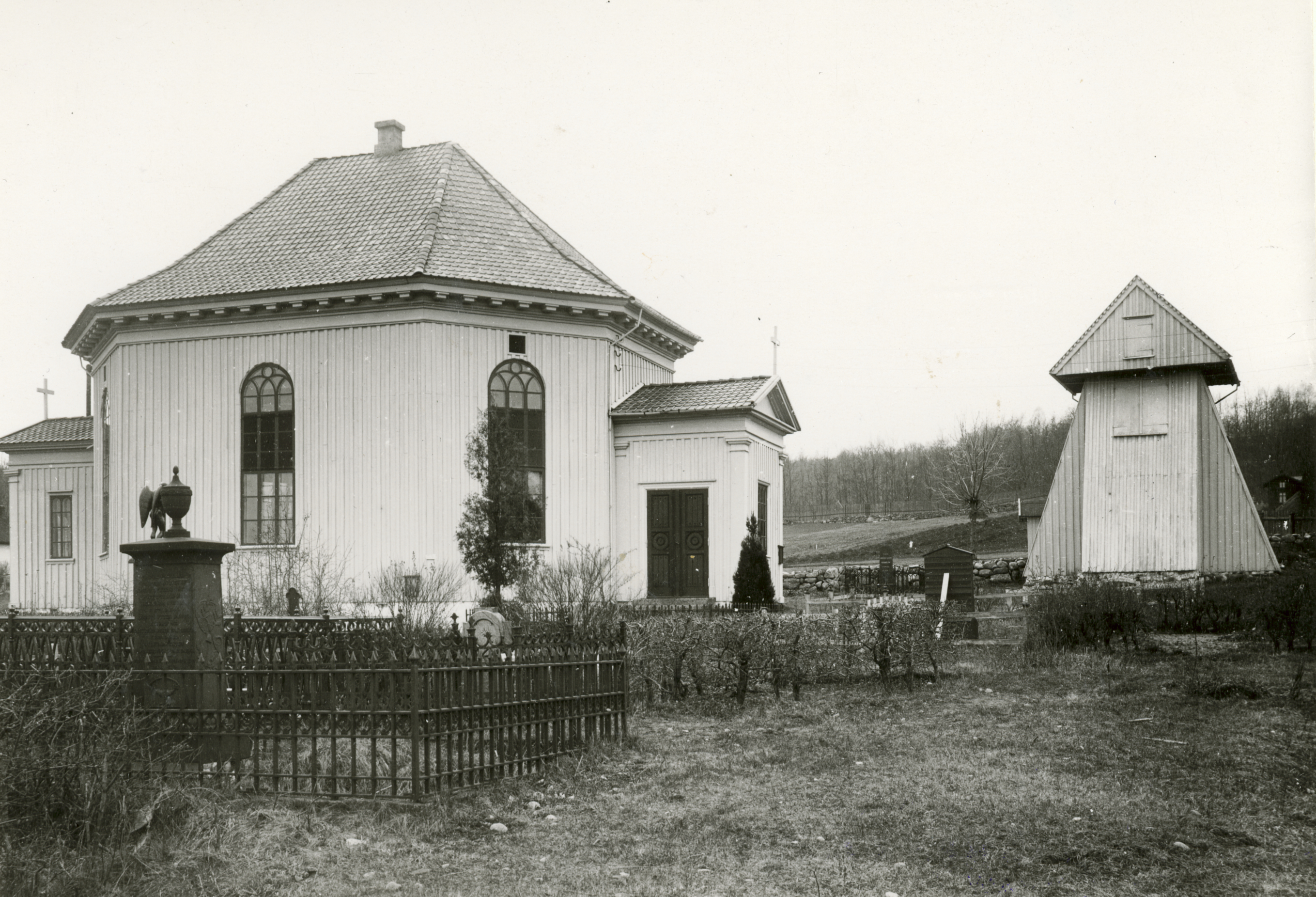
View of the church

The first church in Langestrand was built in 1642 and it was located just outside of the Fritzøe Jernverk factory. Around 1690, the Count Ulrik Frederik Gyldenløve gave the order to reconstruct the old church and make it larger. It was likely just expanded and not completely rebuilt. After the construction was done in 1692, the church measured about 170 square metres (1,800 sq ft) in size. In 1699, a new bell tower was built. By 1730, records show that the nearly 90-year-old church was in poor condition. In 1811, the church was torn down so that the factory could be expanded and blast furnaces could be built where the church used to stand. The demolition of the church was considered scandalous at the time, and the blast furnace plans were never actually carried out.

It took a few years before the church was rebuilt on a new site. The new building was constructed in an octagonal nave design and it was consecrated on 1 Feb 1818. The south side of the octagon has a rectangular chancel extending to the south. The architect and lead builder was Hans Christian Lind. In 1908, the chancel was rebuilt. In 1906 a new sacristy was built. In 1910, the church porch was rebuilt. The church does not have a bell tower, but it does have a free-standing spire.

== See also ==
- List of churches in Tunsberg
