= Vrådal Church =

Church in Telemark, Norway

- Vrådal kyrkje
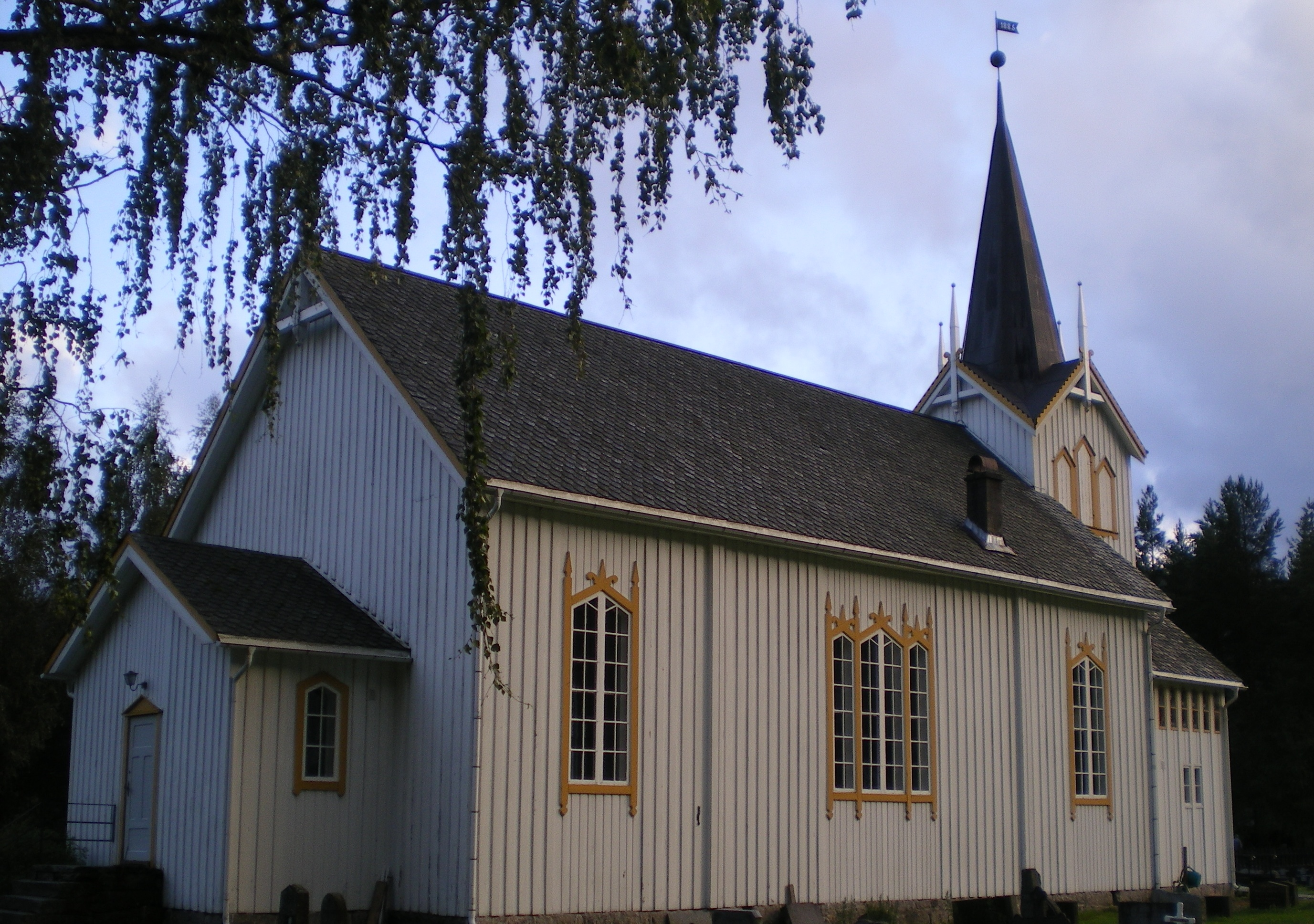
- View of the church
- Vrådal Church
- 59°19′40″N 8°25′01″E
- Location: Kviteseid Municipality, Telemark
- Country: Norway
- Denomination: Church of Norway
- Previous denomination: Catholic Church
- Churchmanship: Evangelical Lutheran

History
- Status: Parish church
- Founded: 1300s
- Consecrated: 17 June 1887

Architecture
- Functional status: Active
- Architect: Christian Grosch
- Architectural type: Long church
- Completed: 1887 (139 years ago)

Specifications
- Capacity: 170
- Materials: Wood

Administration
- Diocese: Agder og Telemark bispedømme
- Deanery: Øvre Telemark prosti
- Parish: Kviteseid
- Norwegian Cultural Heritage Site
- Type: Church
- Status: Listed
- ID: 85870

Vrådal Church (Norwegian: Vrådal kyrkje) is a parish church of the Church of Norway in Kviteseid Municipality in Telemark county, Norway. It is located in the village of Vrådal. It is one of the churches in the Kviteseid parish which is part of the Øvre Telemark prosti (deanery) in the Diocese of Agder og Telemark. The white, wooden church was built in a long church design in 1887 using plans drawn up by the architect Christian Grosch. The church seats about 170 people.

== History ==
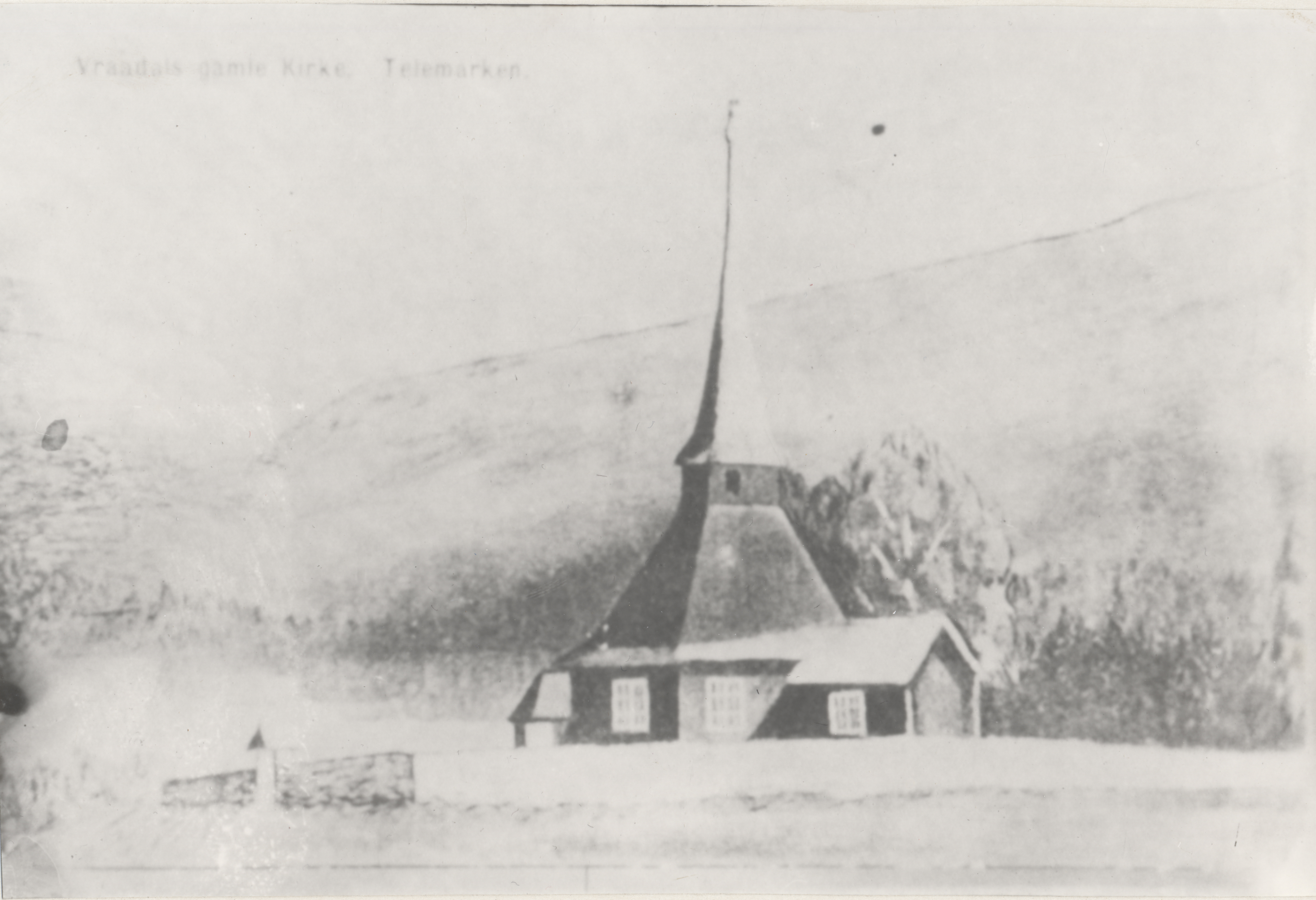
Old church building (1685-1887)

Historical records mention the church in 1395, though it had not been built yet. The first church in Vrådal was a wooden stave church located at Roholt, about 2 kilometres (1.2 mi) to the east of the present church site. The original stave church may have been built during the 1300s. In 1668, the church is described as in quite poor condition. In 1685, the old church was torn down and a new timber-framed, octagonal church was built on the same site. It is said that this may have been the first octagonally designed church in Norway. The new church was consecrated in 1886. The outer dimensions of the nave were about 10 metres (33 ft) and the tower reached a height of about 20 metres (66 ft). The octagonal church had a steep octagonal roof with a tower. There were no supporting columns inside the church, so that the tower was supported by huge beams that rested on the outer walls and laid in a large cross. In the tower there were two church bells and strings to these hung down in the church room through the ceiling. During the 19th century, it was expanded with an extension for the choir. The parish residents bought the church for 110 rigsdaler in 1726.

By the 1880s, the old octagonal church had become too small for the parish. In 1886, it was decided, despite some protests, to move the new church to a site about 2 kilometres (1.2 mi) to the west, on the eastern shores of the lake Vråvatnet. The new church was designed by Christian Grosch as a wooden long church. The church has a west tower (which is surrounded by a stairwell), a rectangular nave, a choir that is the same width of the nave. There is a sacristy that extends to the east from the choir. The new church was completed in 1887 and consecrated on 17 June 1887. The last service in the old church was held on 19 May 1887 and then the old church was closed. The pulpit, altarpiece, baptismal font, brass candlesticks, and some other furnishings from the old church were moved to the church. The old church building was demolished in 1888.

== See also ==
- List of churches in Agder og Telemark
