= Åsmarka Church =

Church in Innlandet, Norway

- Åsmarka kirke
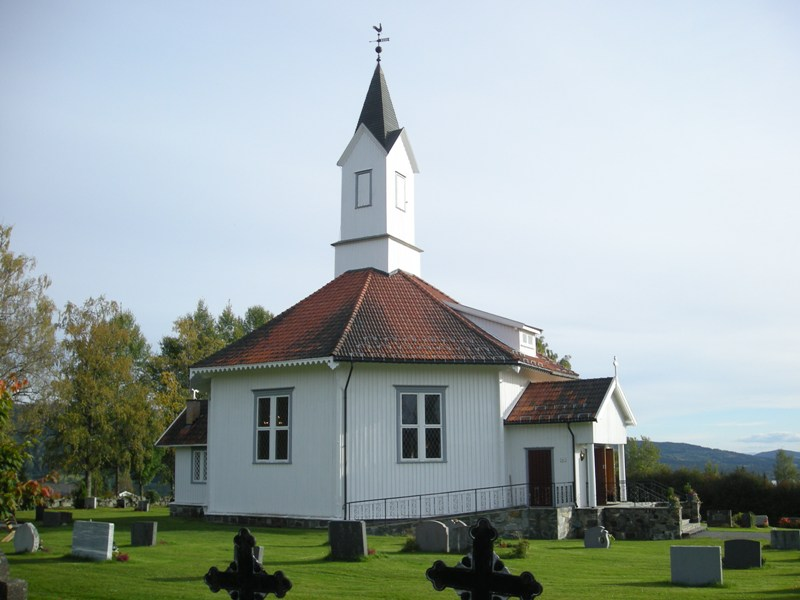
- View of the church
- Åsmarka Church
- 61°00′42″N 10°46′48″E
- Location: Ringsaker Municipality, Innlandet
- Country: Norway
- Denomination: Church of Norway
- Churchmanship: Evangelical Lutheran

History
- Status: Parish church
- Founded: 1859
- Consecrated: 1860

Architecture
- Functional status: Active
- Architect: Jacob Wilhelm Nordan
- Architectural type: Octagonal
- Completed: 1859 (167 years ago)

Specifications
- Capacity: 180
- Materials: Wood

Administration
- Diocese: Hamar bispedømme
- Deanery: Ringsaker prosti
- Parish: Åsmarka
- Norwegian Cultural Heritage Site
- Type: Church
- Status: Not protected
- ID: 85998

Åsmarka Church (Norwegian: Åsmarka kirke) is a parish church of the Church of Norway in Ringsaker Municipality in Innlandet county, Norway. It is located in the village of Åsmarka. It is the church for the Åsmarka parish which is part of the Ringsaker prosti (deanery) in the Diocese of Hamar. The white, wooden church was built in a octagonal design in 1859 using plans drawn up by the architect Jacob Wilhelm Nordan. The church seats about 180 people.

== History ==
The Brøttum Church parish was quite large and the people of the Åsmarka area had long wished for a chapel of their own. In the mid-1800s, the parish began planning for an annex chapel at Åsmarka, known then as Aasmarken Chapel. In 1858, Jacob Wilhelm Nordan was hired to design the building (this was his first of nearly 100 churches that he designed in his career). The building was an octagonal design and reminiscent of the Swiss chalet style. It had a church porch extension on the west end and a sacristy extension in the east. Construction took place in 1859. It was completed on 2 November 1859 and it was consecrated early in 1860, but the date is not known. In 1901, the old church porch was removed and a new porch was constructed. In 1981, the chapel was upgraded to parish church status and has been titled Åsmarka Church since that time.

== Media gallery ==
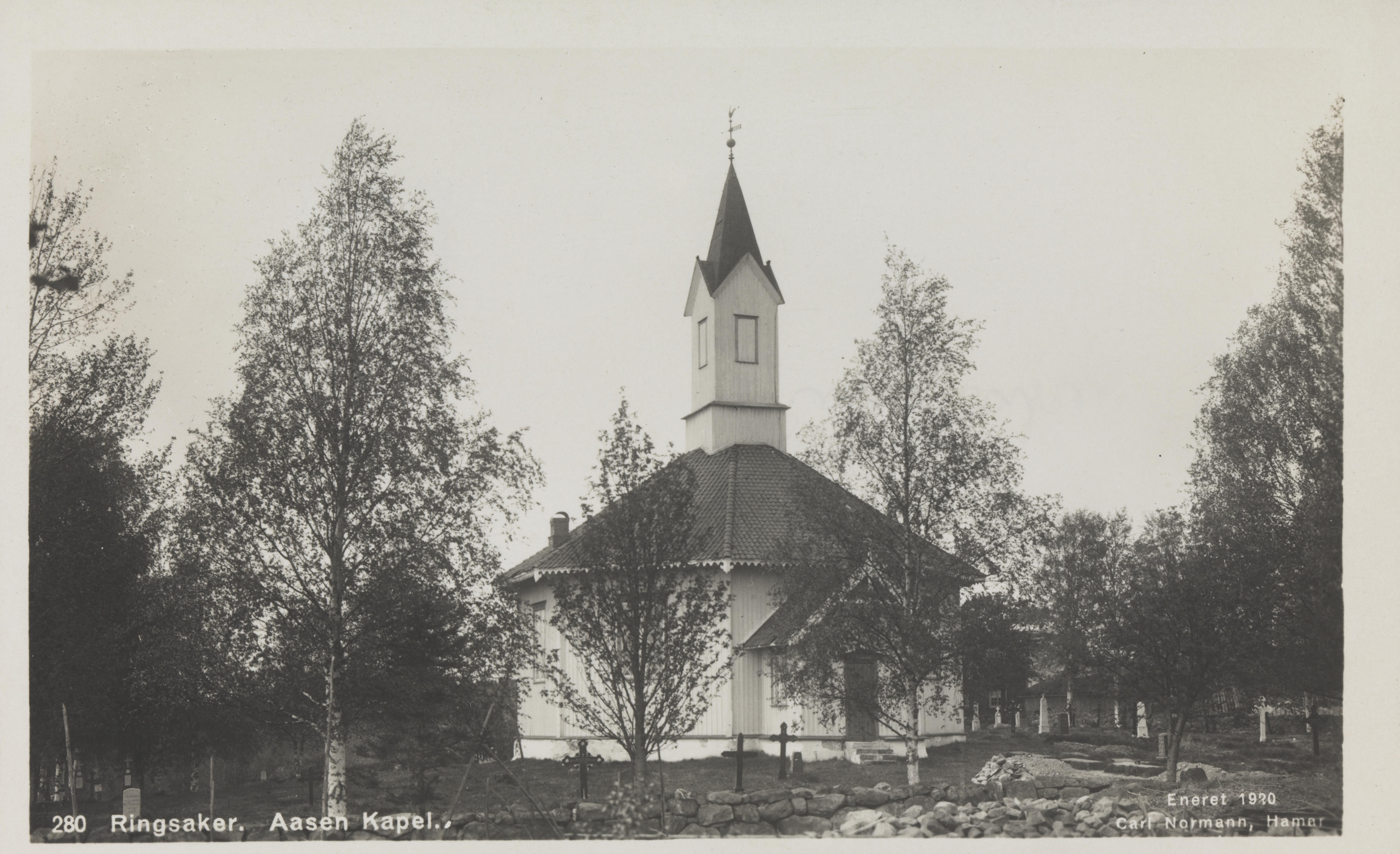

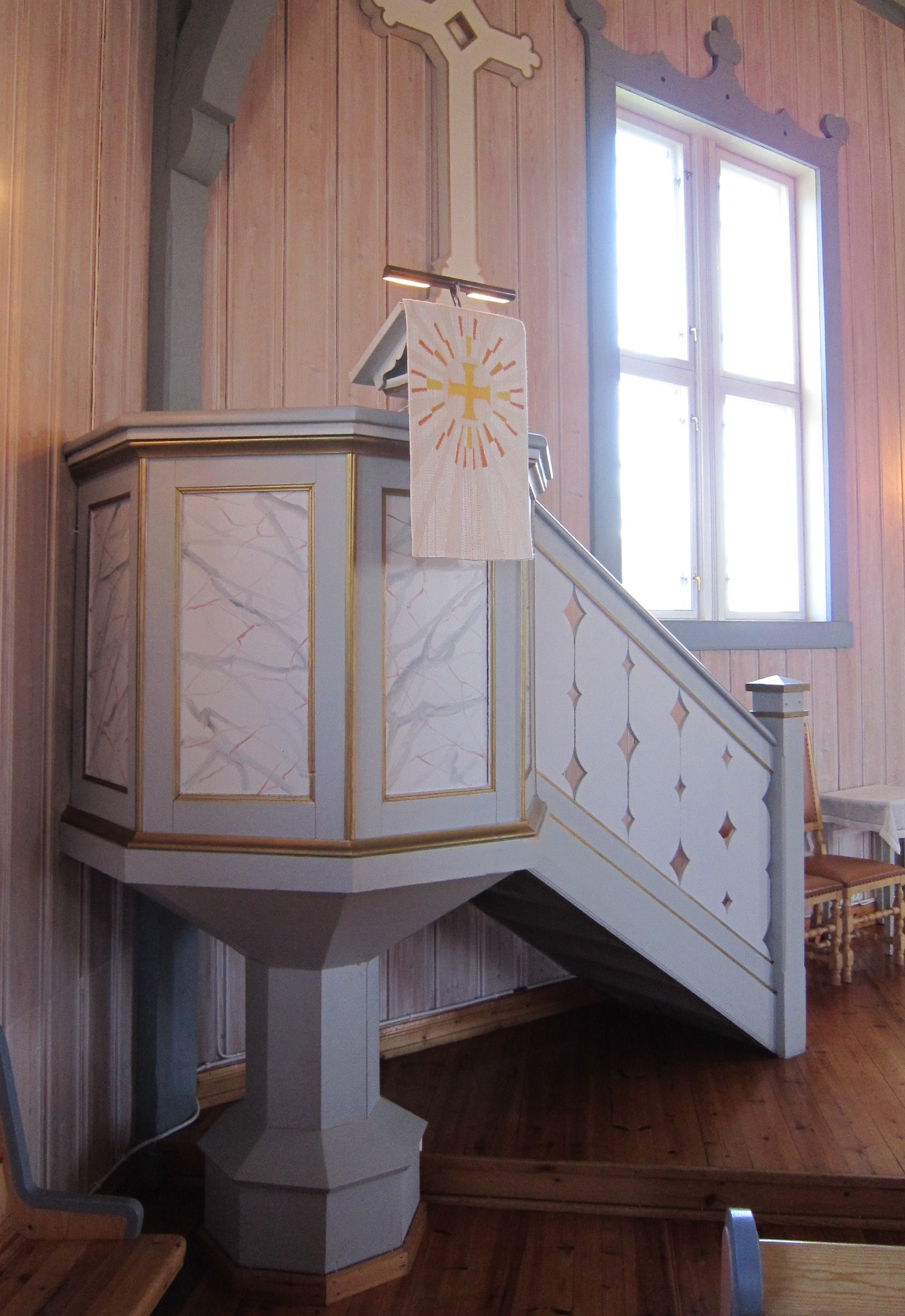

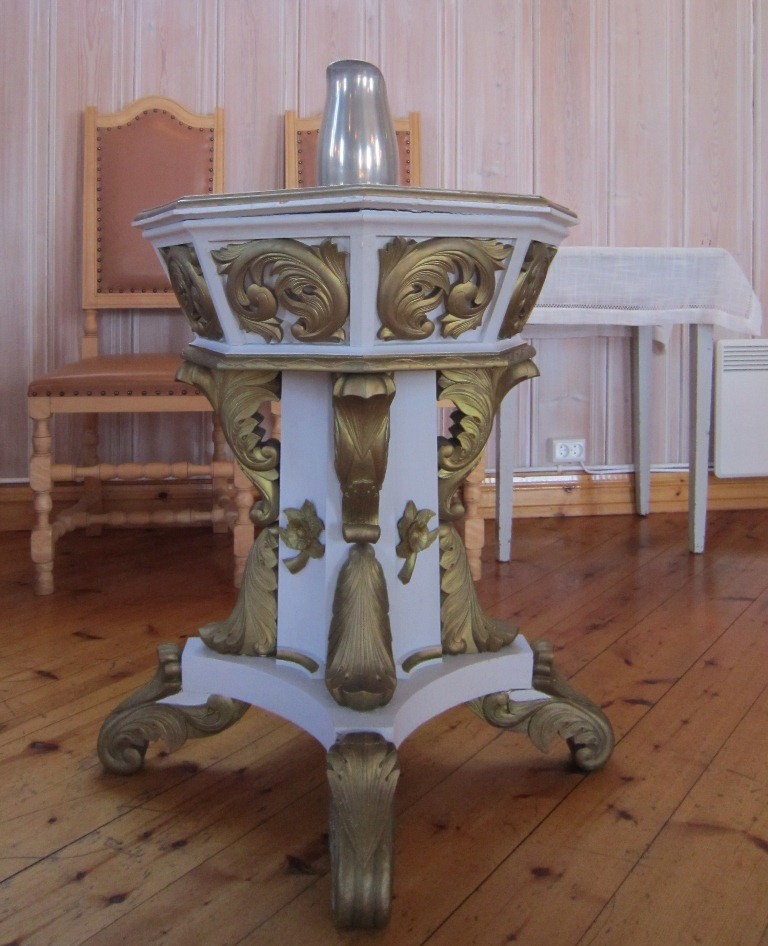

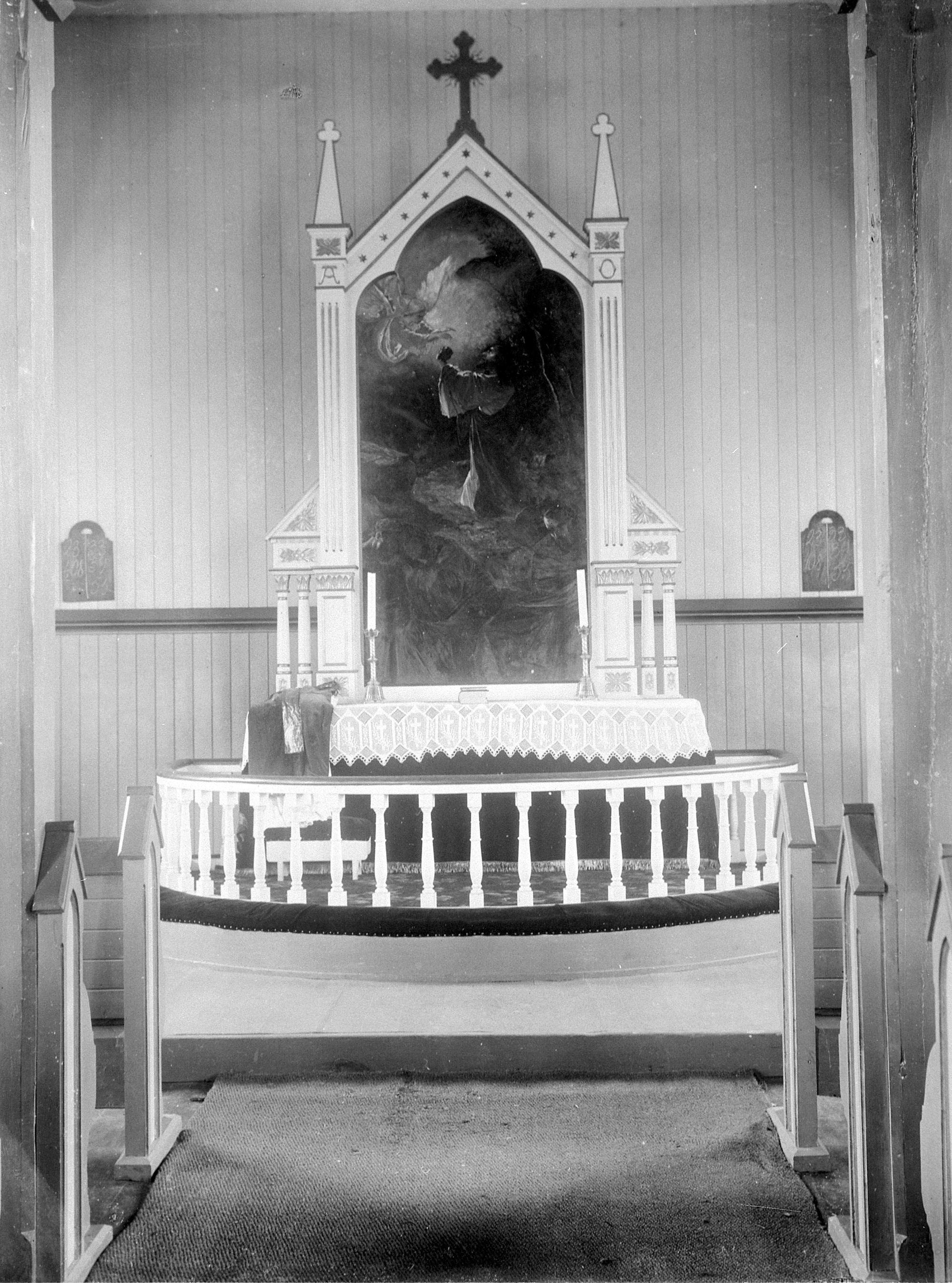

== See also ==
- List of churches in Hamar
