= Sør-Fron Church =

Church in Innlandet, Norway

- Sør-Fron kyrkje
- Gudbrandsdalsdomen
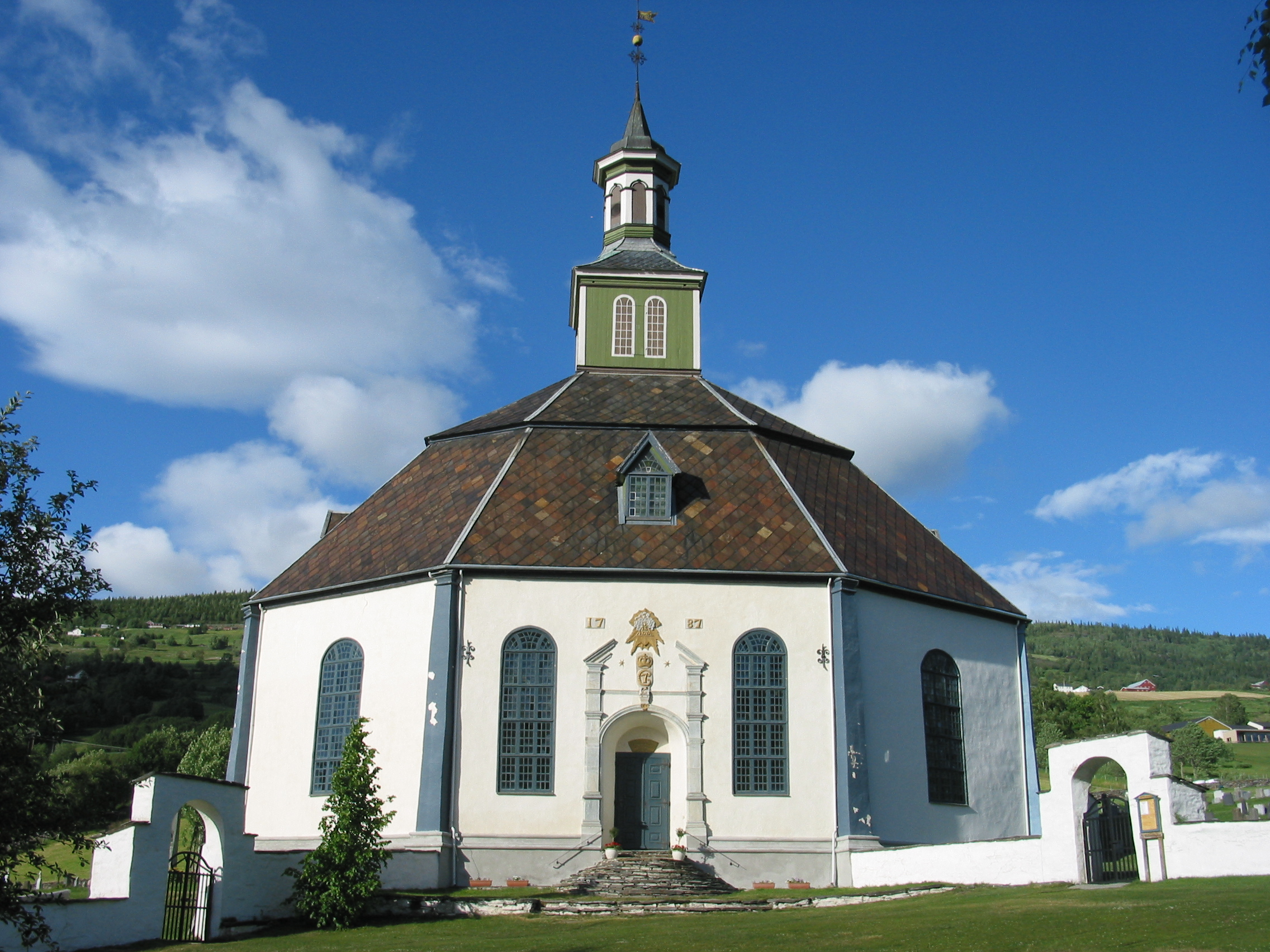
- View of the church from the south-west
- Sør-Fron Church
- 61°33′31″N 9°56′32″E
- Location: Sør-Fron Municipality, Innlandet
- Country: Norway
- Denomination: Church of Norway
- Previous denomination: Catholic Church
- Churchmanship: Evangelical Lutheran

History
- Status: Parish church
- Founded: 13th century
- Consecrated: 28 March 1792

Architecture
- Functional status: Active
- Architect: Svend Aspaas
- Architectural type: Octagonal
- Style: Baroque
- Completed: 1792 (234 years ago)

Specifications
- Capacity: 750
- Materials: Stone

Administration
- Diocese: Hamar bispedømme
- Deanery: Sør-Gudbrandsdal prosti
- Parish: Sør-Fron
- Norwegian Cultural Heritage Site
- Type: Church
- Status: Automatically protected
- ID: 85052

Sør-Fron Church (Norwegian: Sør-Fron kyrkje) is a parish church of the Church of Norway in Sør-Fron Municipality in Innlandet county, Norway. It is located in the village of Hundorp. It is the church for the Sør-Fron parish which is part of the Sør-Gudbrandsdal prosti (deanery) in the Diocese of Hamar. The white, stone church was built in an octagonal design in 1792 using plans drawn up by the architect Svend Aspaas. The church seats about 750 people.

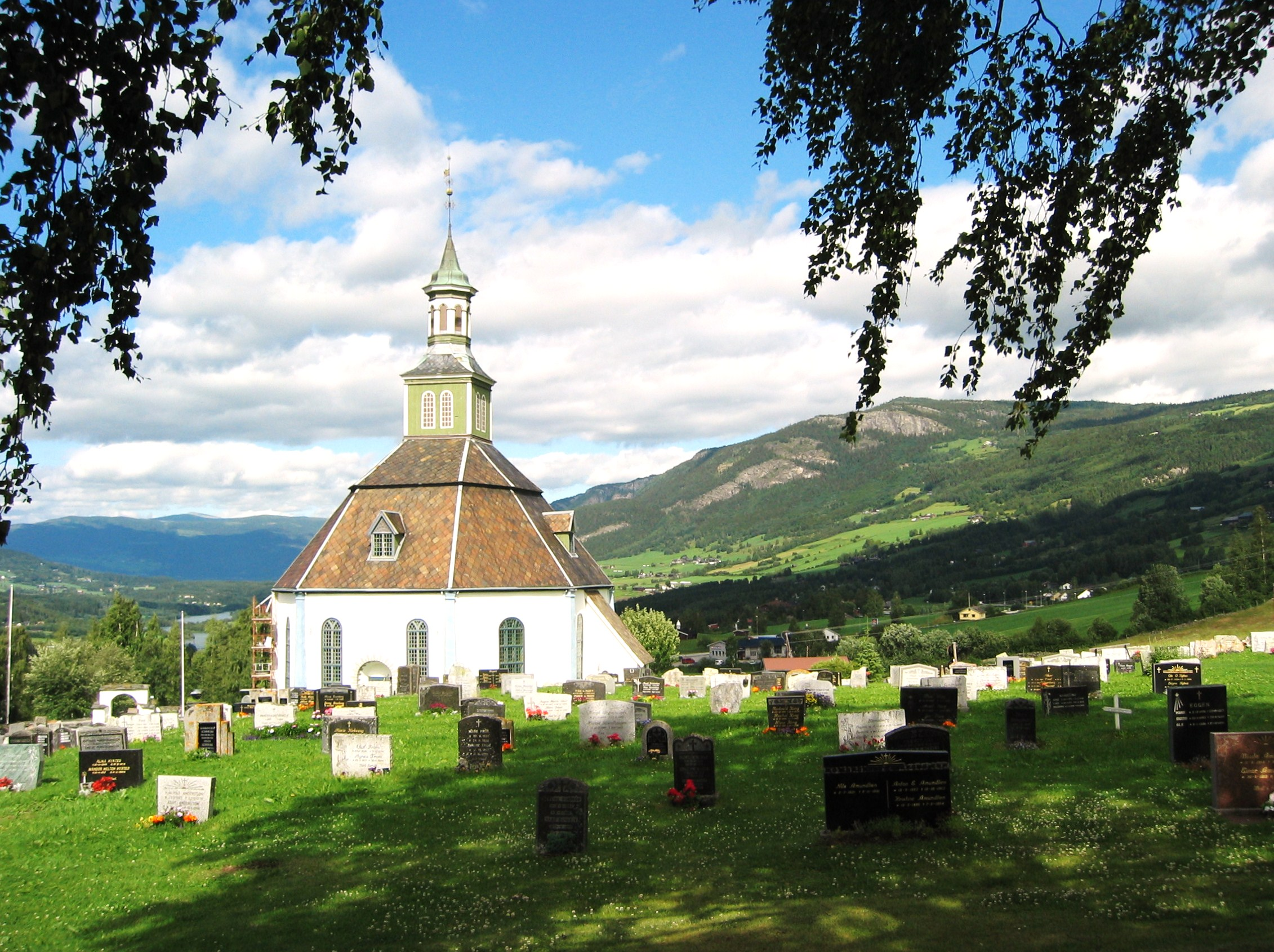
Sør-Fron Church as seen from south-east, river Lågen in the background.

Because of size (750 seats) and central location in the Gudbrandsdalen valley, it has been nicknamed the Gudbrandsdalen cathedral (Norwegian: Gudbrandsdalsdomen). The church has an octagonal floor plan and it is decorated in a colorful baroque style. It is one of the few rural churches from the 1700s in Norway that is constructed out of stone. Its style and design was unusual or unique in Norway at the time of construction.

The church is described as the greatest building of the 1700s in Gudbrandsdalen. Muri describes the interior as holistic. and Hosar believes the building to be imposing and very sophisticated for its time. Harry Fett described the building as "graceful" and believed that Røros Church as well as local wood carving traditions influenced the design. According to Hosar, Sør-Fron church left few traces on subsequent church construction in Gudbrandsdalen, possibly because a period of extensive church building just came to an end. Sør-Fron Church served as a model for Grytten Church (in the present-day Rauma Municipality), the latter constructed in timber. Grytten Church is the only directly modeled on Sør-Fron Church, this most clearly seen in the interior. Unlike Sør-Fron church, Grytten Church is a regular octagon and the roof is straight without the small jump that is characteristic for Sør-Fron church.

== Design ==
The church has an octagonal plan and is laid out in late baroque style with details in Louis XVI style. It was unusually colorful for its time. While the great new churches of the time (Røros, Kongsberg, and Nykirken) offered specific elements, there are no Norwegian models from the period and parallels can be found in Danish or Dutch church architecture, such as Frederiksberg Church. Very similar are the churches in Brande-Hörnerkirchen in Schleswig-Holstein from 1752 and in Niendorf, Hamburg from 1767. Hosar also suggests that Sant'Andrea al Quirinale by Bernini is the original inspiration. The angles of the octagon plan are not equal, so that the octagon has a somewhat elongated shape - the larger angels are 145° while the smaller are 125° (in a regular octagon angels are 135°). Because of the elongated octagon and sloping ground the church gives a different impression from various perspectives. Viewed directly towards the main entrance the church appears wide, while viewed towards the short walls it appears slender with a steep roof, from other perspectives it may appear warped. The altar points in the North-Eastern direction, rather than traditional Eastern - probably because of the terrain. A gallery runs around most of the interior. The church has a central tower resting on the roof ridge. Pulpit and altar are located on one of the longer walls and the building is characterized as a ″broad church″. The pulpit is integrated in the altar, creating a pulpit altar (″Kanzelaltar″ in German), according to the ideals of the reformation and in the same style as Røros Church and Vang Church (in Hamar Municipality) - these are also two major masonry octagonal churches.(Photo of interior with altar and pulpit, around 1900.) The pulpit was made in 1703 for an older church.

Walls and foundation were built from ordinary hard rock found in the ground or in quarries nearby. These naturally rectangular blocks were joined by lime mortar mixed with clay, the lime mortar and clay mix was also used for plaster. Decorative details are made from soapstone. The royal monogram C7 and the word IEHOVA can be seen on the exterior. There are four doors and twelve windows. Between main walls there are spans of 19 metres (62 ft) and 26 metres (85 ft). The long span and the hip roof required a complex web of large wooden beams. Four columns in the nave supports the roof construction.

== History ==
The earliest existing historical records of the church date back to the year 1370, but the church was not new that year. The first church was a wooden stave church that was likely built during the 13th century. This church was located about 500 metres (1,600 ft) north of the present church site. In 1617, the old church was extensively renovated by adding transept wings to create a cruciform floor plan. In 1694, the roof rafters were replaced. At the Norwegian church auction in 1723, the churches came into private ownership after the King sold them to help pay debts from the Great Northern War. After this, there was hectic construction activity in Gudbrandsdalen, with new church buildings constructed in many places.

By the 1770s, the parish began to look to replace the old church. In the application for a new church, it was noted that the old church stood on swampy and unsuitable grounds, therefore, the church would need to be built on a new site. It was also stated that the present church was quite old, too small, and in poor condition. The new site that was chosen was about 500 metres (1,600 ft) down the hill to the south. Røros church was completed in 1784 by Svend Aspaas who was hired to build the new church in Sør-Fron. Master builder Svend Aspaas used his experience and skills in constructing tall masonry walls and arches to complete the church. Aspås had previously been engaged in the construction of the Røros Church, as well as masonry work for roads and dams for the Røros Copper Works. The construction of the new church began in 1786. It took about a year to complete the masonry walls which is why 1787 is marked above the main entrance. The following year, 1787, the roof was completed which is why 1788 is engraved on the wind vane. Then, in 1789 the great Storofsen flood occurred, one of the worst floods in the history of Gudbrandsdalen. There were landslides and flooding, and lots of destruction. All work on the church was paused while homes and farms and roads were repaired. It took until 1792 to finish the project. The new church was consecrated on 28 March 1792. The old church was demolished after the new church was completed. Some of the furnishings and artwork from the old church was transferred into the new church.

There are few or no Norwegian parallels and Sør-Fron church displays features found in German Protestant churches from that period. In the local tradition, wood was the preferred material and log construction was the dominant technique. Virtually all rural churches at the time were wooden, more than 90% of all churches built in Norway until 1850 were wooden. Masonry churches were more costly and labour-intensive than traditional wood construction. A stone church was at the time estimated as 50-100% more costly to build than a wooden church. It remains unclear why such an unusual and expensive church was erected in Sør-Fron. Hosar and Skrondal propose possible explanations. Sør-Fron was a rich, relatively populous and central community in Gudbrandsdalen, and hosted regional officials as well as the garrison for Gudbrandsdalen including officers of Danish and German descent. The self-confidence of the leading men of Fron at the time may be part of the explanation, according to Hosar and Skrondal. Hosar also mentions that troops from Fron did military service in Schleswig-Holstein, then under the Danish crown, and may have observed the many new churches being constructed in Holstein at the time. While wood was the dominant building material, locals had already some experience in masonry construction, notably livestock buildings (barns).

In 1814, this church served as an election church (Norwegian: valgkirke). Together with more than 300 other parish churches across Norway, it was a polling station for elections to the 1814 Norwegian Constituent Assembly which wrote the Constitution of Norway. This was Norway's first national elections. Each church parish was a constituency that elected people called "electors" who later met together in each county to elect the representatives for the assembly that was to meet at Eidsvoll Manor later that year.

== Media gallery ==
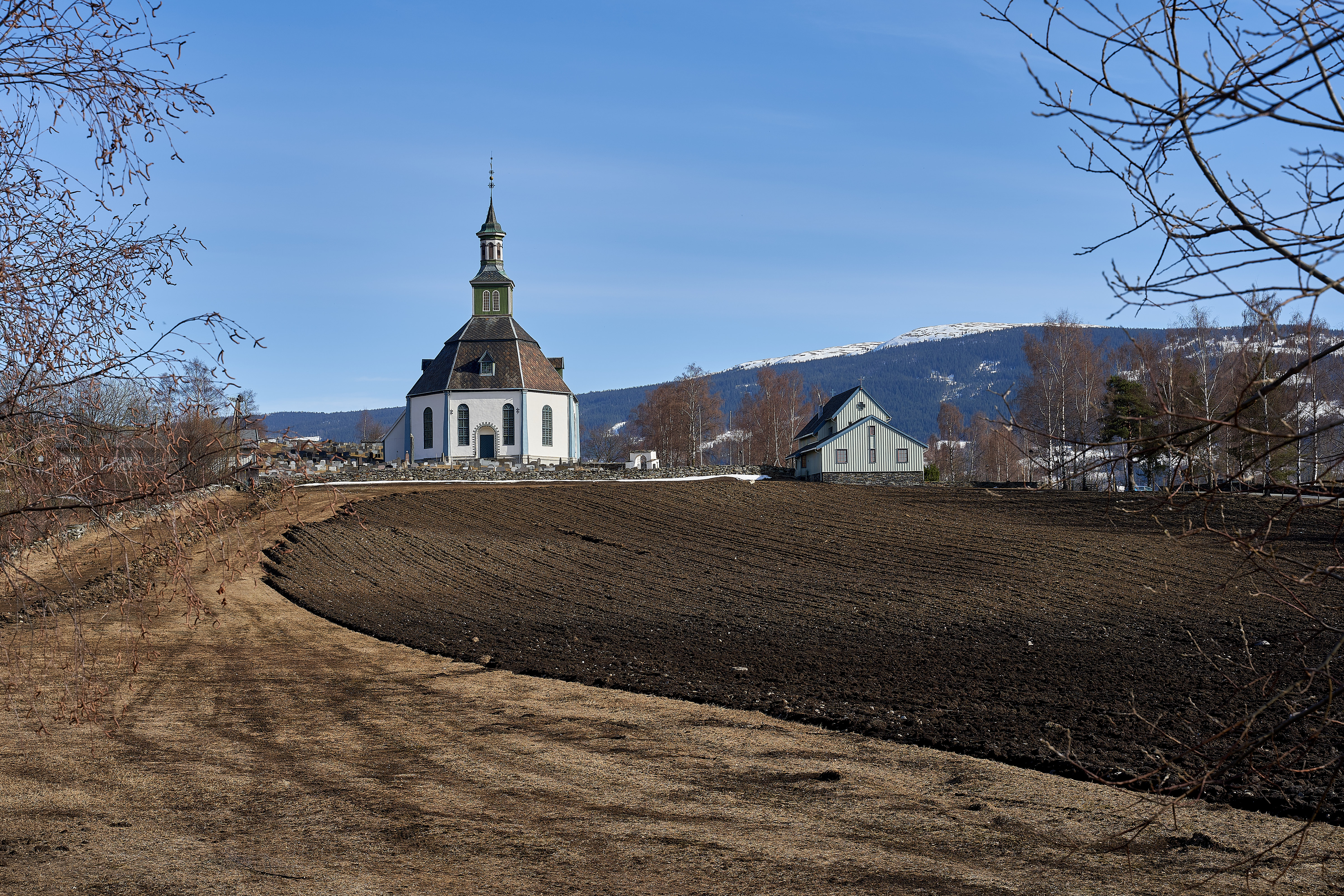

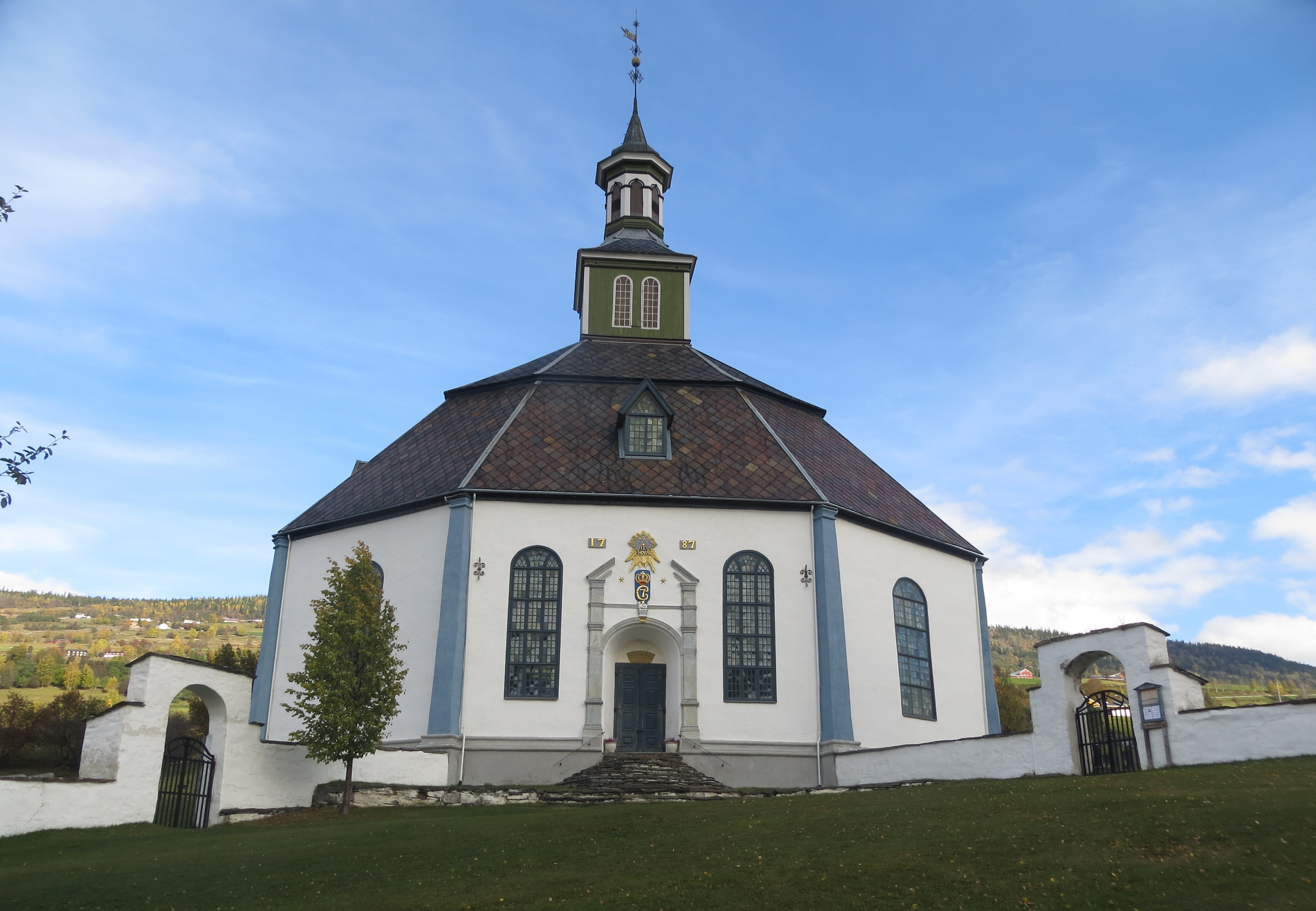

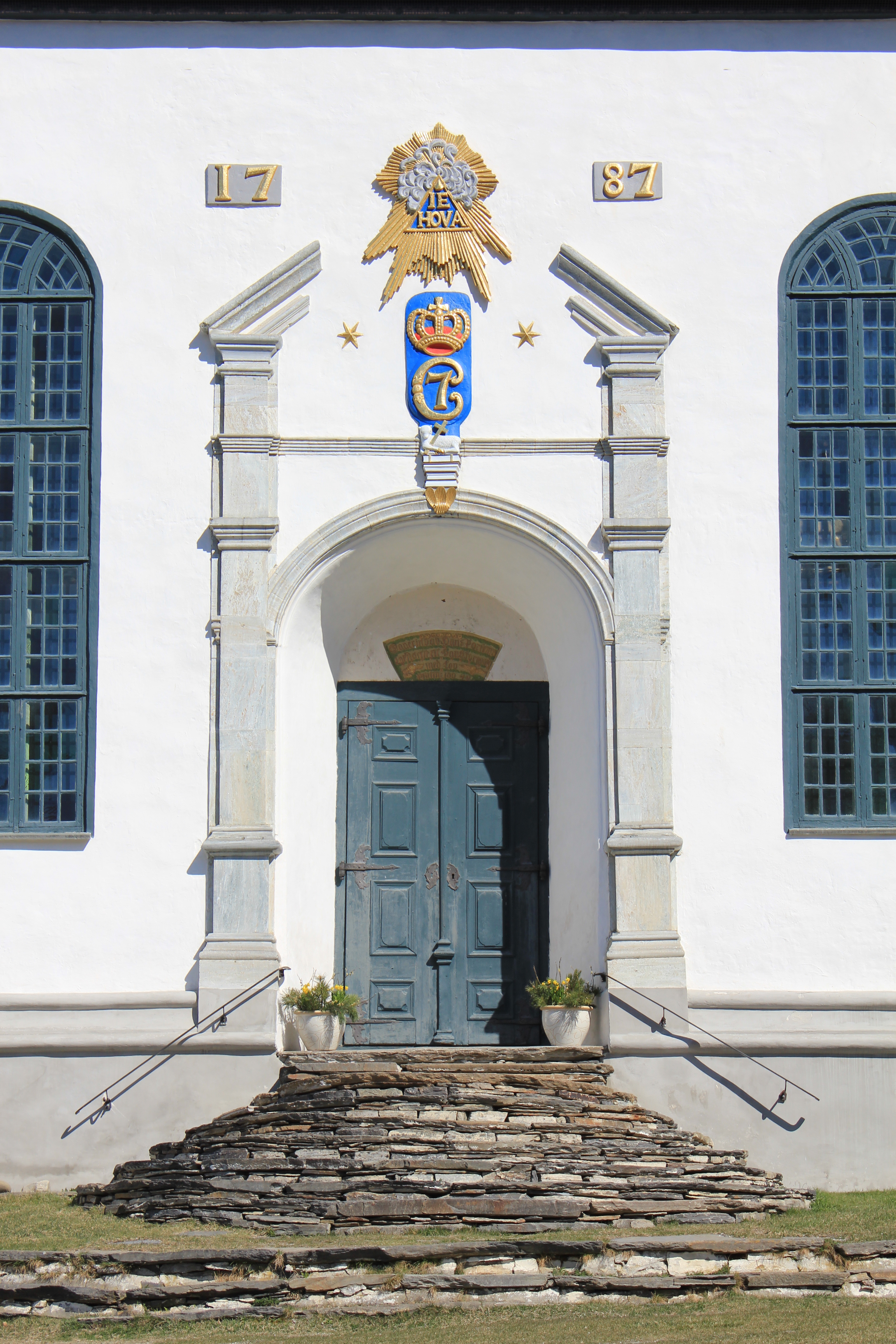

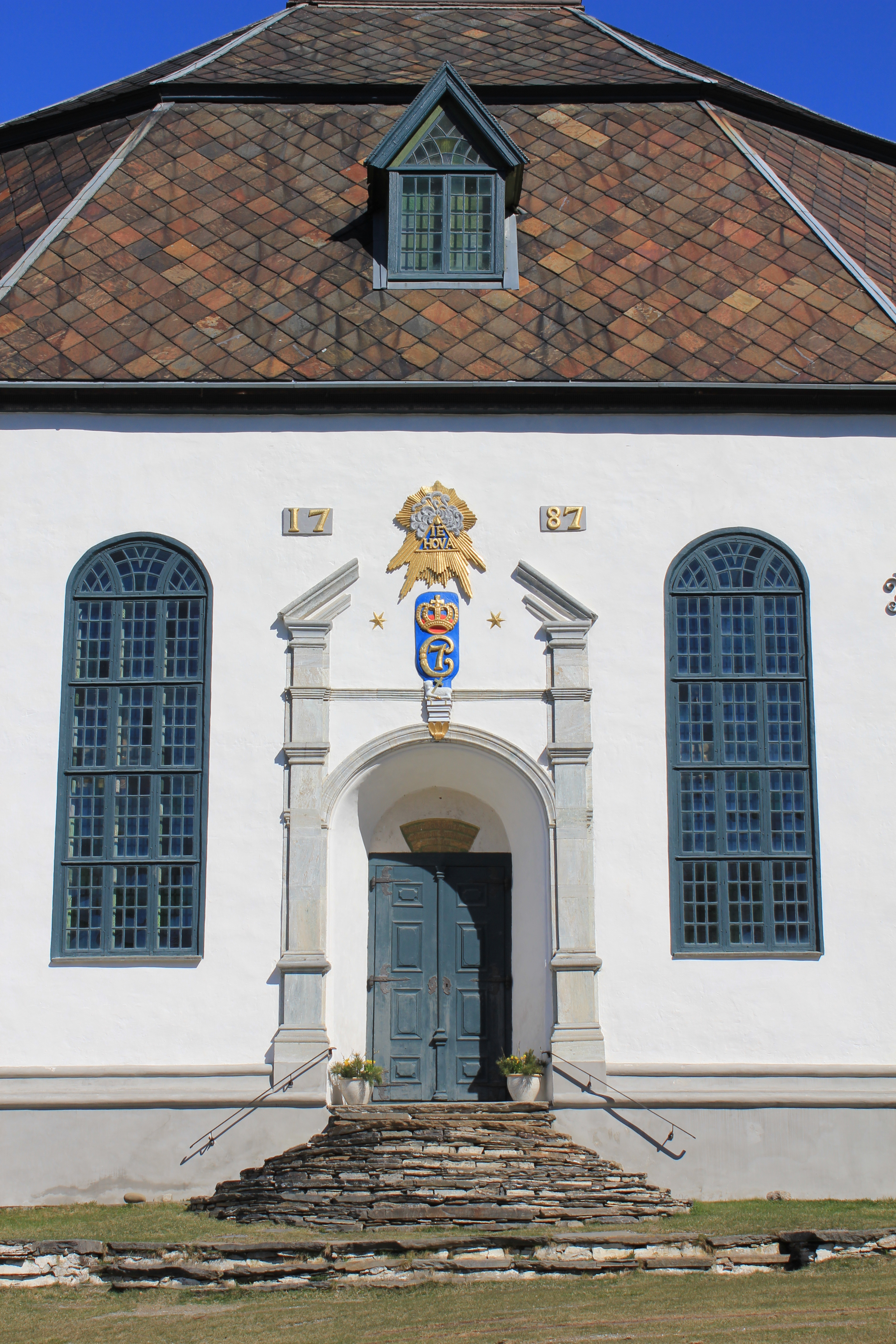

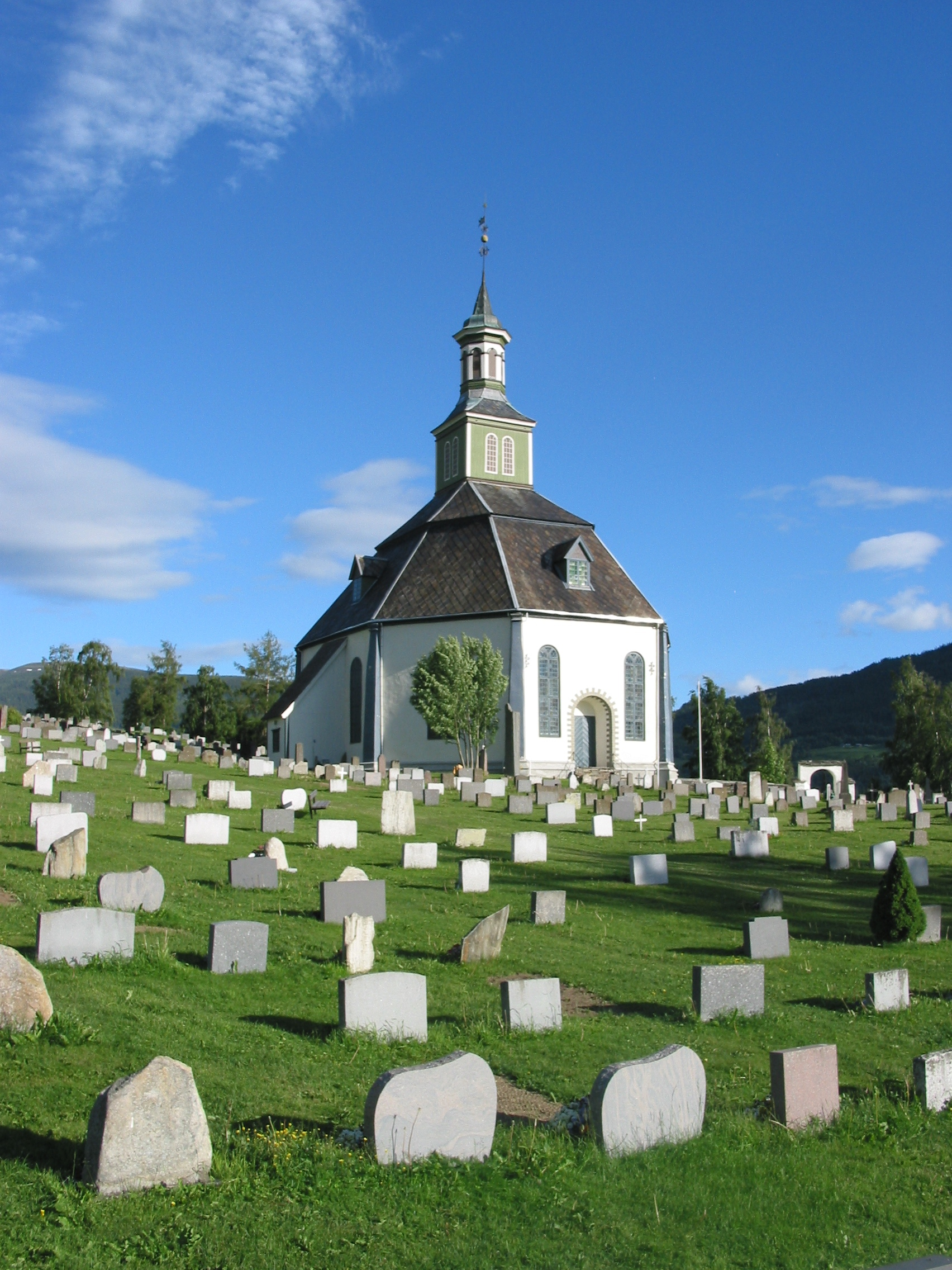

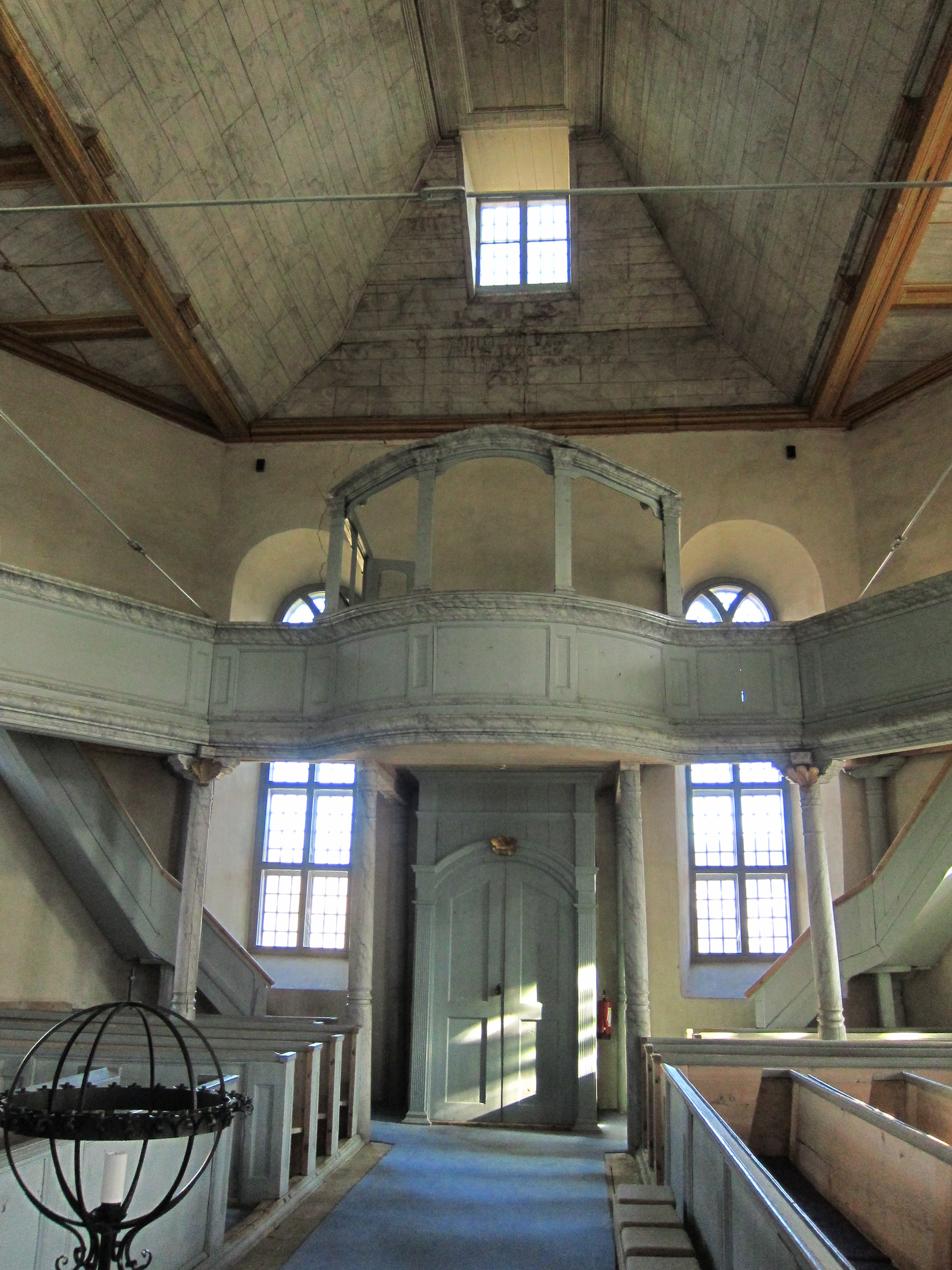

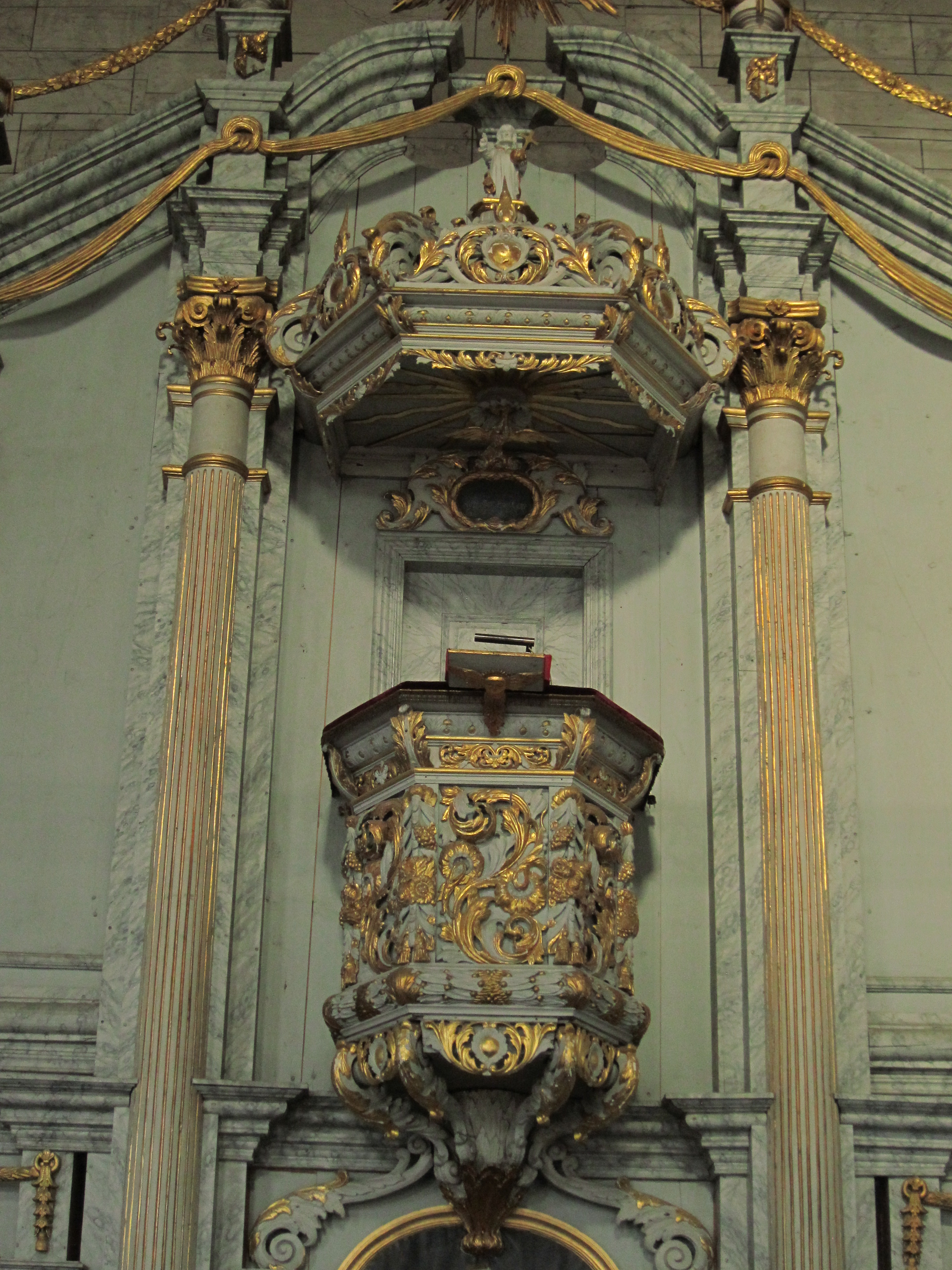

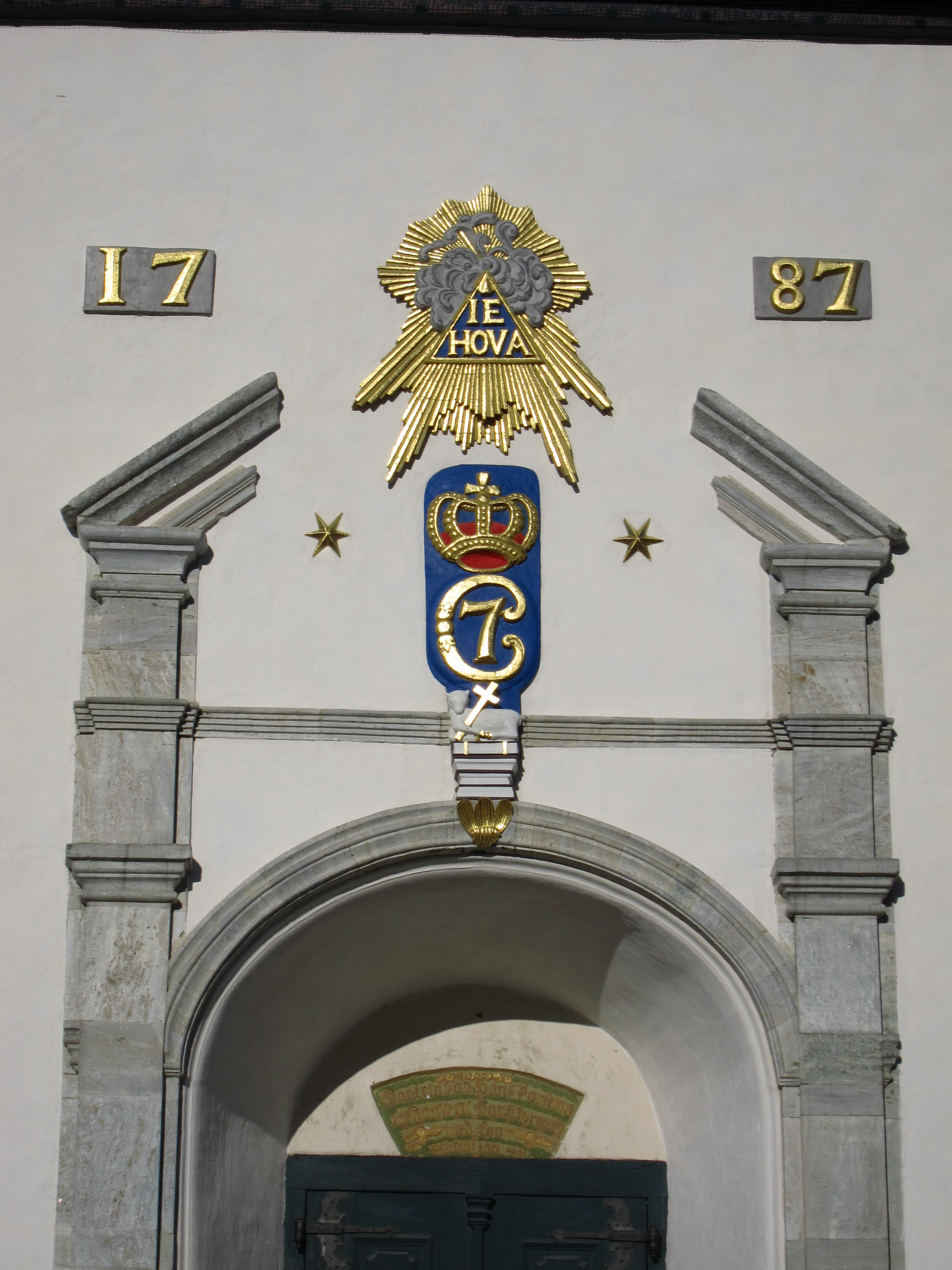

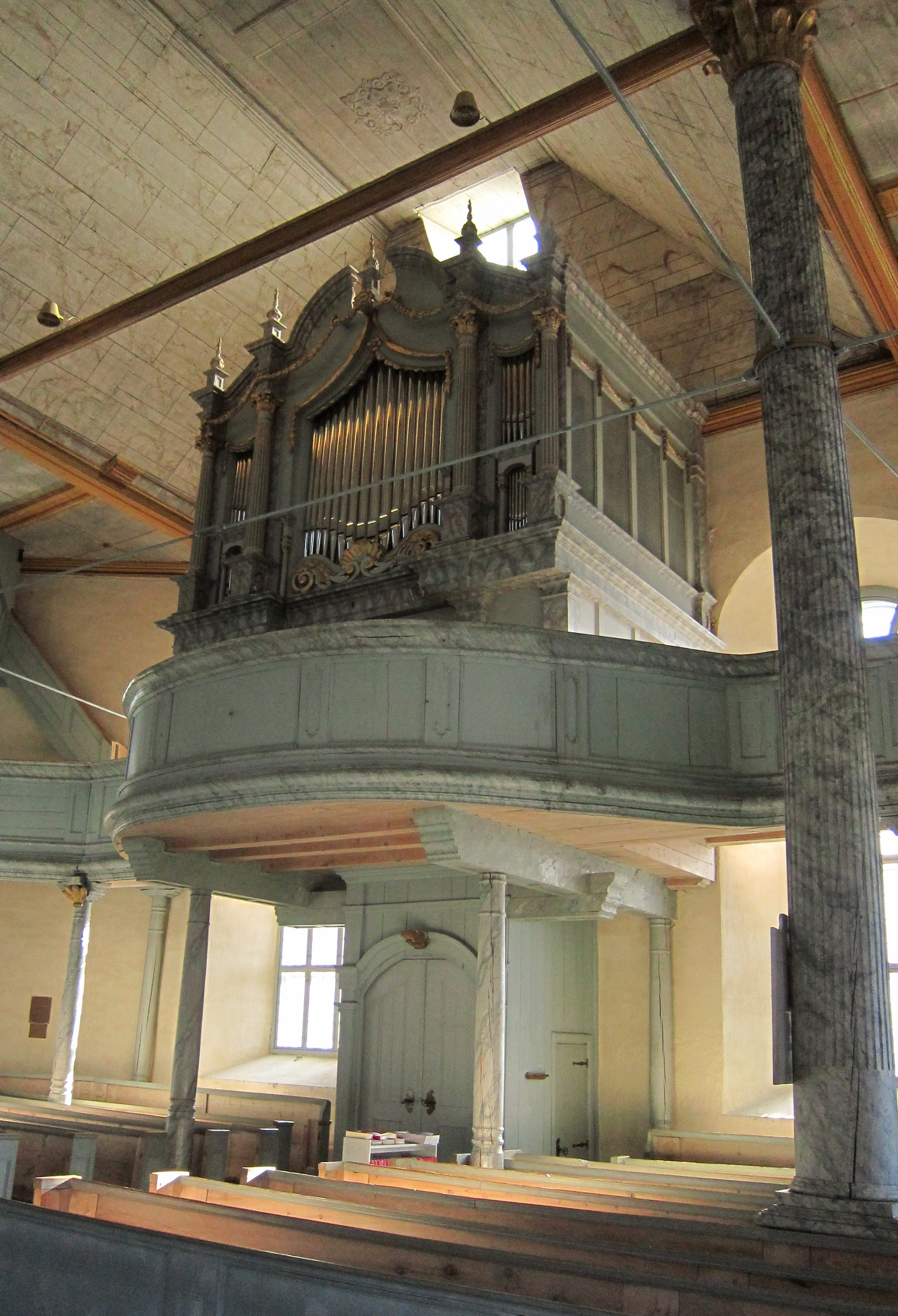

== See also ==
- Octagonal churches in Norway
- List of churches in Hamar
