= Grytten Church =

Church in Møre og Romsdal, Norway

- Grytten kyrkje
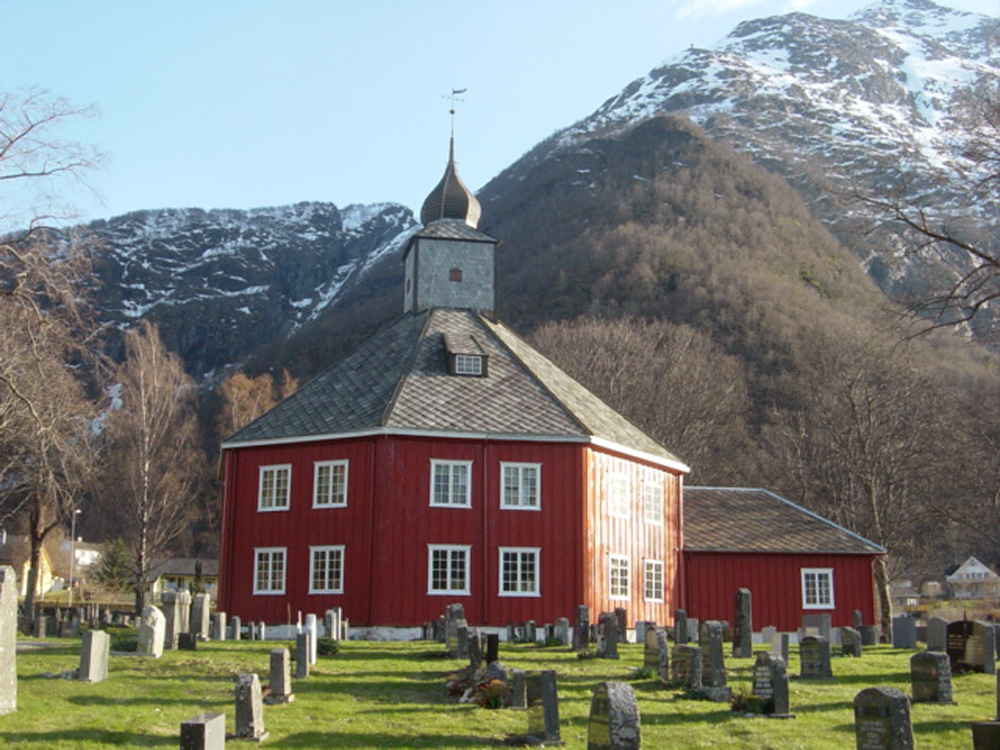
- View of the church
- Grytten Church
- 62°33′10″N 7°40′23″E
- Location: Rauma Municipality, Møre og Romsdal
- Country: Norway
- Denomination: Church of Norway
- Churchmanship: Evangelical Lutheran

History
- Status: Parish church
- Founded: 13th century
- Consecrated: 27 September 1829

Architecture
- Functional status: Active
- Architect: S.H. Aspaas
- Architectural type: Octagonal
- Completed: 1829 (197 years ago)

Specifications
- Capacity: 250
- Materials: Wood

Administration
- Diocese: Møre bispedømme
- Deanery: Indre Romsdal prosti
- Parish: Grytten
- Norwegian Cultural Heritage Site
- Type: Church
- Status: Automatically protected
- ID: 84440

Grytten Church (Norwegian: Grytten kyrkje) is a parish church of the Church of Norway in Rauma Municipality in Møre og Romsdal county, Norway. It is located near the mouth of the Rauma River in the village of Veblungsnes. It is the church for the Grytten parish which is part of the Indre Romsdal prosti (deanery) in the Diocese of Møre. The red, wooden church was built in an octagonal design in 1829 using plans drawn up by the architect S.H. Aspaas, possibly using the Sør-Fron Church as a model. The church seats about 250 people.

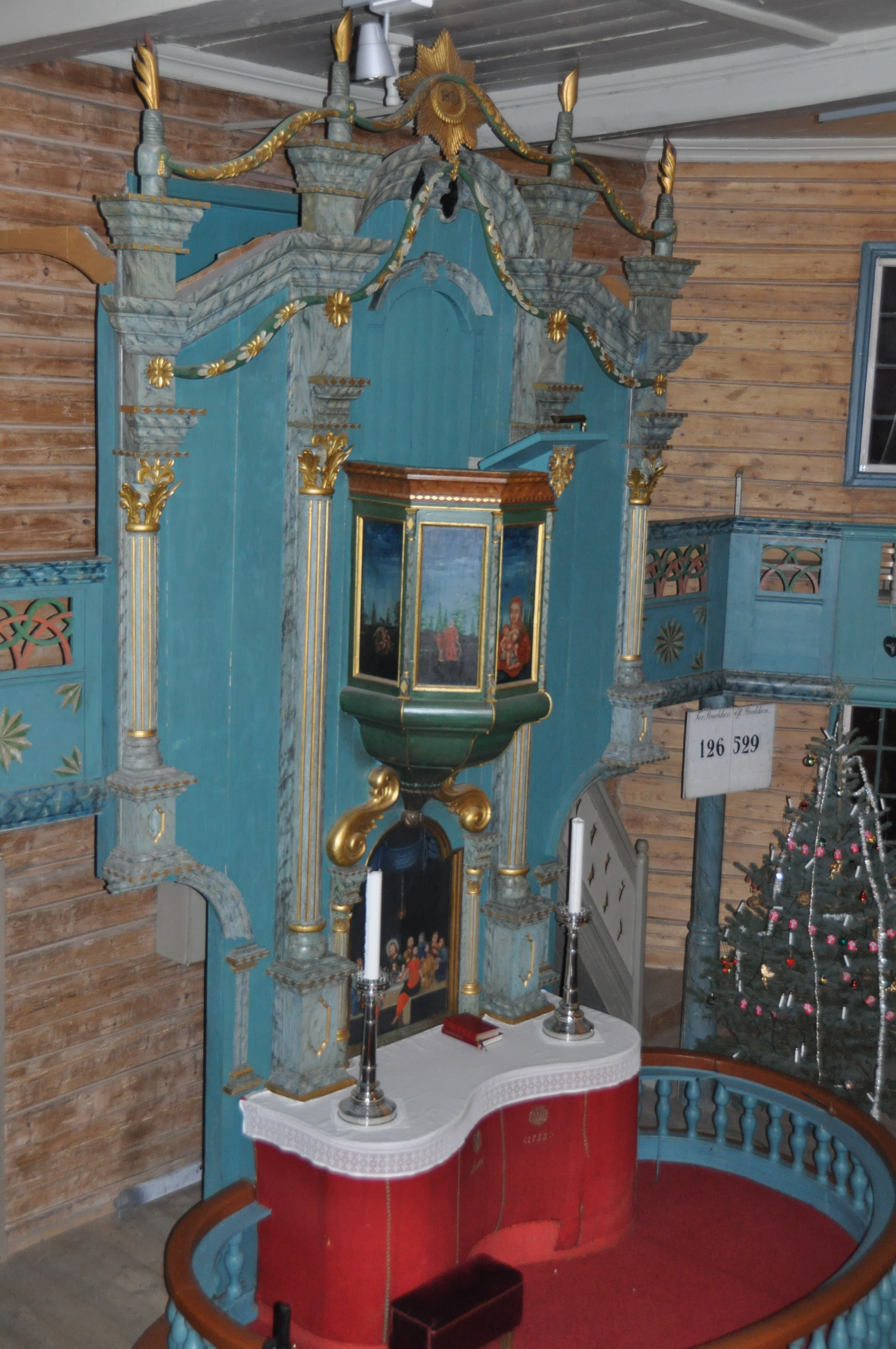
Pulpit-altar seen from the gallery

There are four large columns which support the tower. Inside the church, there is a tall, 2-metre (6 ft 7 in) wide wooden crucifix, possibly from the 13th century. The church has a so-called pulpit altar (Norwegian: Prekestolalter), which is a pulpit centrally located directly above the altar (according to the style of Sør-Fron Church). The two church bells are from the previous churches.

== History ==
The earliest existing historical records of Grytten Church date back to 1364, but it was not new that year. The first church in Grytten was located on the Grytten (or "Grytina") farm (which is why the church, parish, and municipality have had the name Grytten). This farm is located between the rivers Istra and Rauma, about 4 kilometres (2.5 mi) southeast of the present church location. The historic name was Gryttinar kirkja which is mentioned in Aslak Bolt's cadastre. That first building was a wooden stave church that was probably built in the 13th century. Not much is known about this medieval building.

In 1642, the church is reported to have been in dire need of repairs. The medieval stave church was significantly repaired or rebuilt in 1651. In 1663, a new church porch was built on the west end of the nave. In 1670, the interior was renovated and a new altarpiece was installed. In 1691, the old tower was torn down. In 1728, the church had some significant structural failures. Several of the roof beams in the church began to fail as well as parts of the porch, sacristy, and choir. On 29 November 1728, the church roof and walls failed and the entire church crumbled in on itself. Most of the interior furniture was salvaged and stored in the rectory until a new church could be built. In 1732, a new timber-framed cruciform church was completed on the same site. The new church was consecrated in the autumn of 1732.

J.F.L. Dreier's 1826 lithography «Udsigten ved Grytten i Romsdalen» (View of Grytten in Romsdal) shows the old cruciform church with the peculiar summits of the mountains Bispen, Kongen, and Dronninga behind. (See media gallery below.)

In 1814, this church served as an election church (Norwegian: valgkirke). Together with more than 300 other parish churches across Norway, it was a polling station for elections to the 1814 Norwegian Constituent Assembly which wrote the Constitution of Norway. This was Norway's first national elections. Each church parish was a constituency that elected people called "electors" who later met together in each county to elect the representatives for the assembly that was to meet at Eidsvoll Manor later that year.

The church that was built in 1732 stood at Grytten for about 100 years. During this time, most of the forested areas around the church and the local rivers was cut down which caused some of the river banks to shift and the erosion of the areas along the river. Over time, the church began to be threatened by shifting sands along the river banks. Shifting sand was a major problem in the area and large parts of the vicarage (which according to tradition included substantial farmland) was turned into a sand desert. In 1824, a sand dune "9 cubits tall" (about 3 metres or 9.8 feet) was located just east of the church and the church yard was largely covered in sand. The building itself suffered damages from sand penetrating cracks in the walls. So, in 1828, the church building was dismantled and the church site was moved to Veblungsnes, about 4 kilometres (2.5 mi) to the northwest, along the fjord. The church was rebuilt at the new site using some building materials from the old church as well as some new materials. The new church was not based on the old church, but rather it had a new octagonal design with an onion dome, looking nothing like the old church. The building has an altarpiece from the previous church building which dates back to the 13th century. The new church was consecrated on 27 September 1829. In 1868, the church porch was repaired and enlarged. In 1965–1967, the church was enlarged using plans by Torgeir Suul.

== Media gallery ==
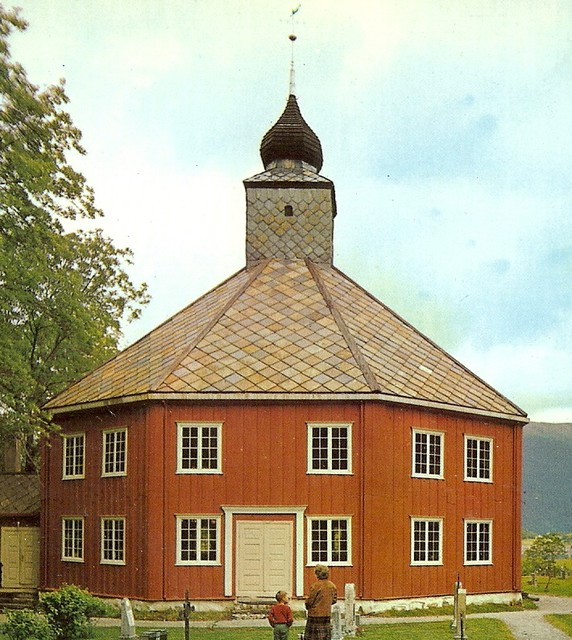
Exterior front

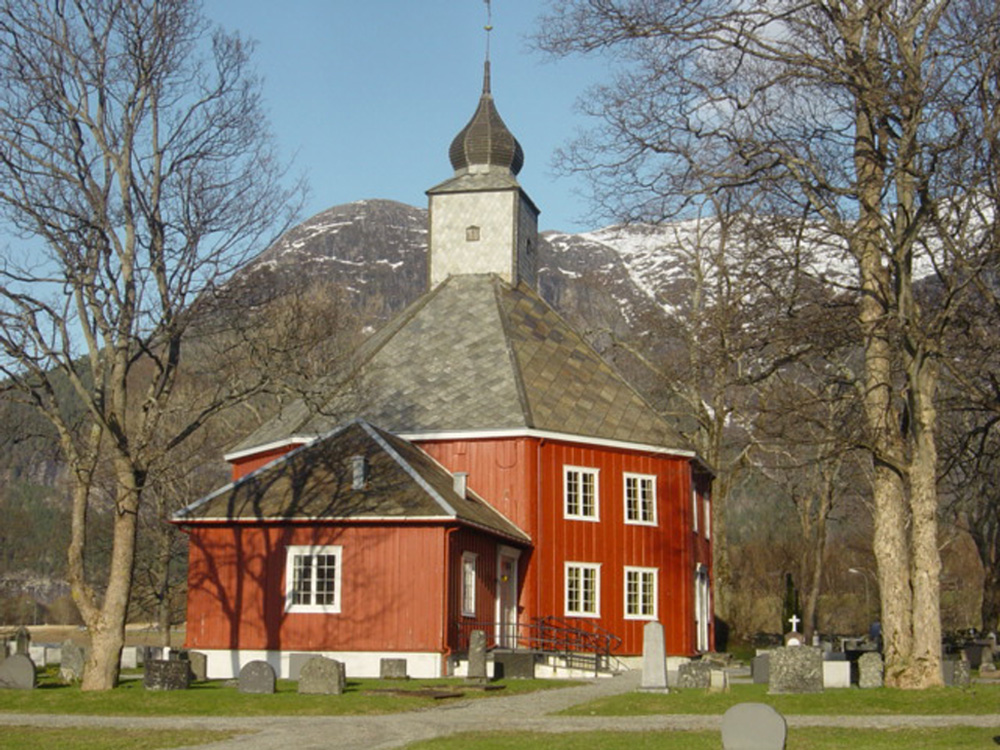
Exterior back

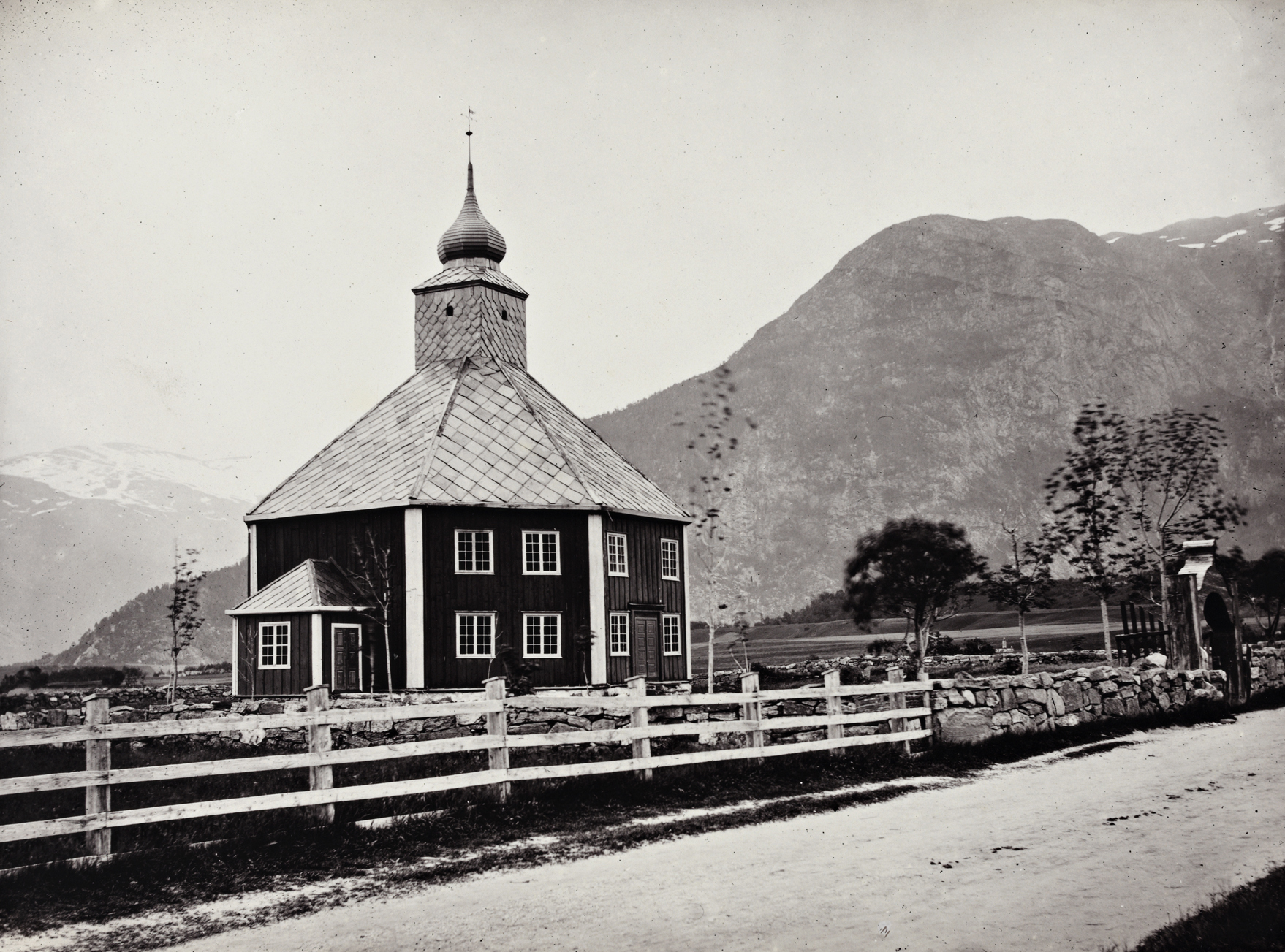
Photo from 1869

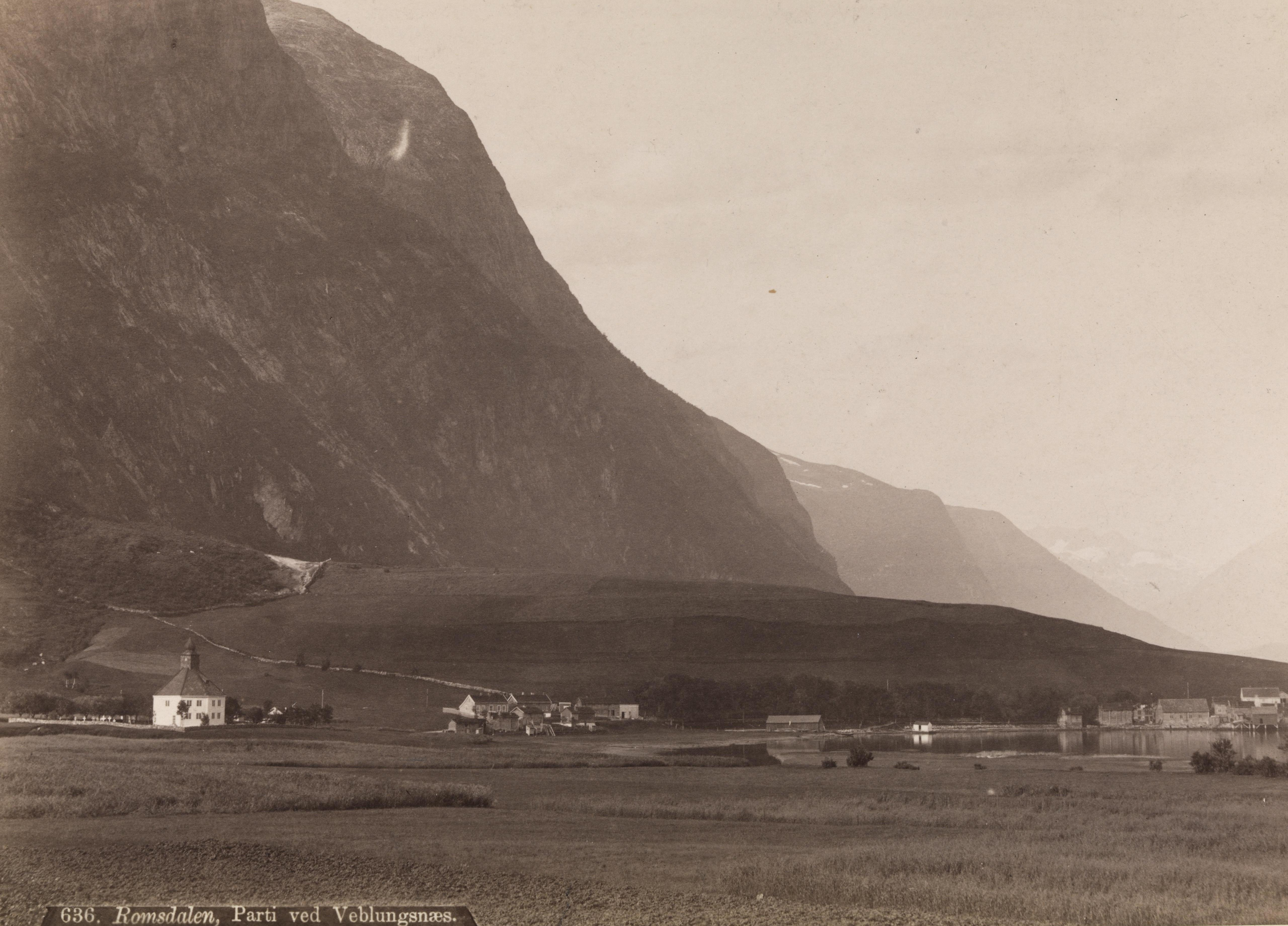

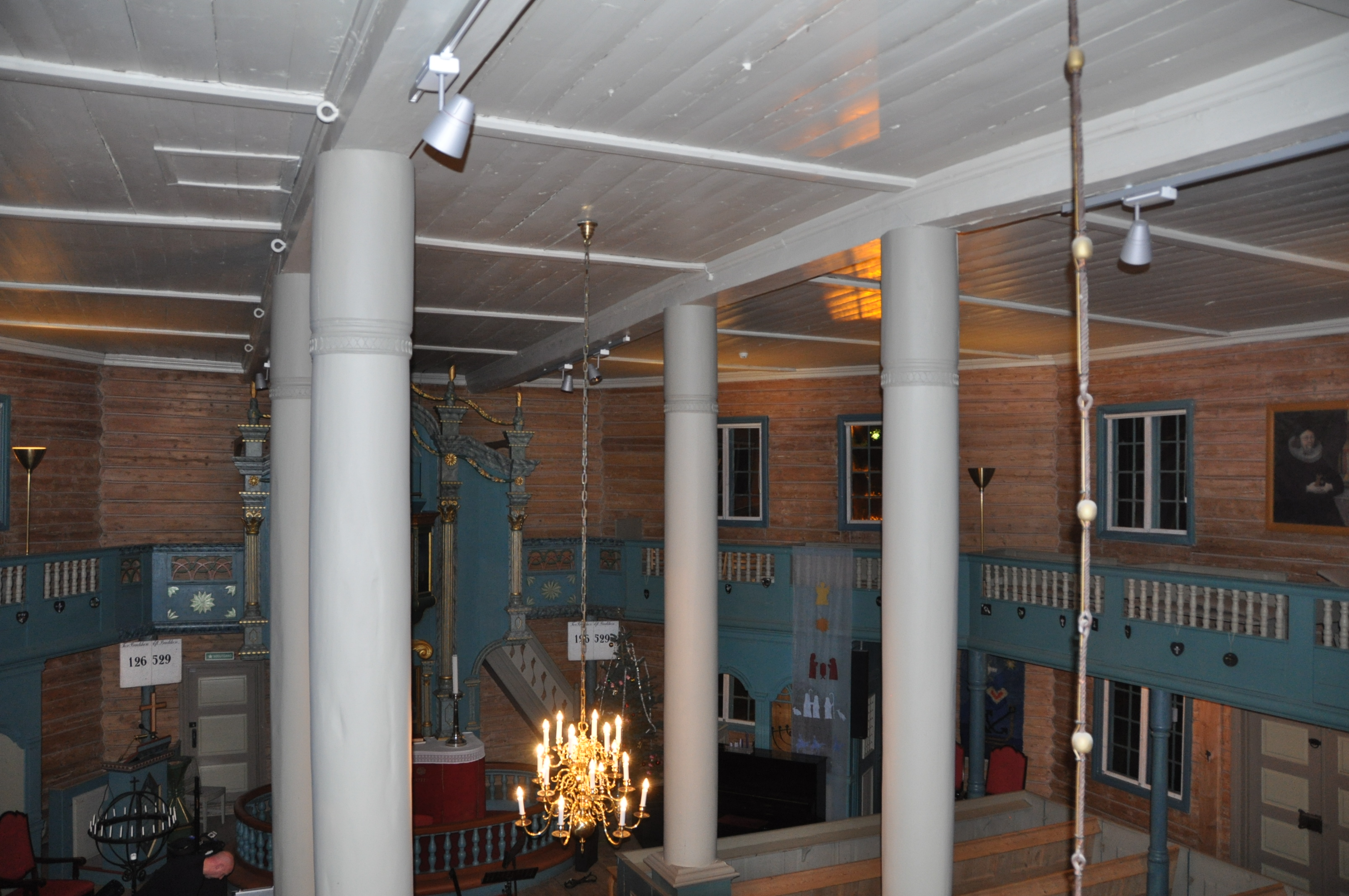

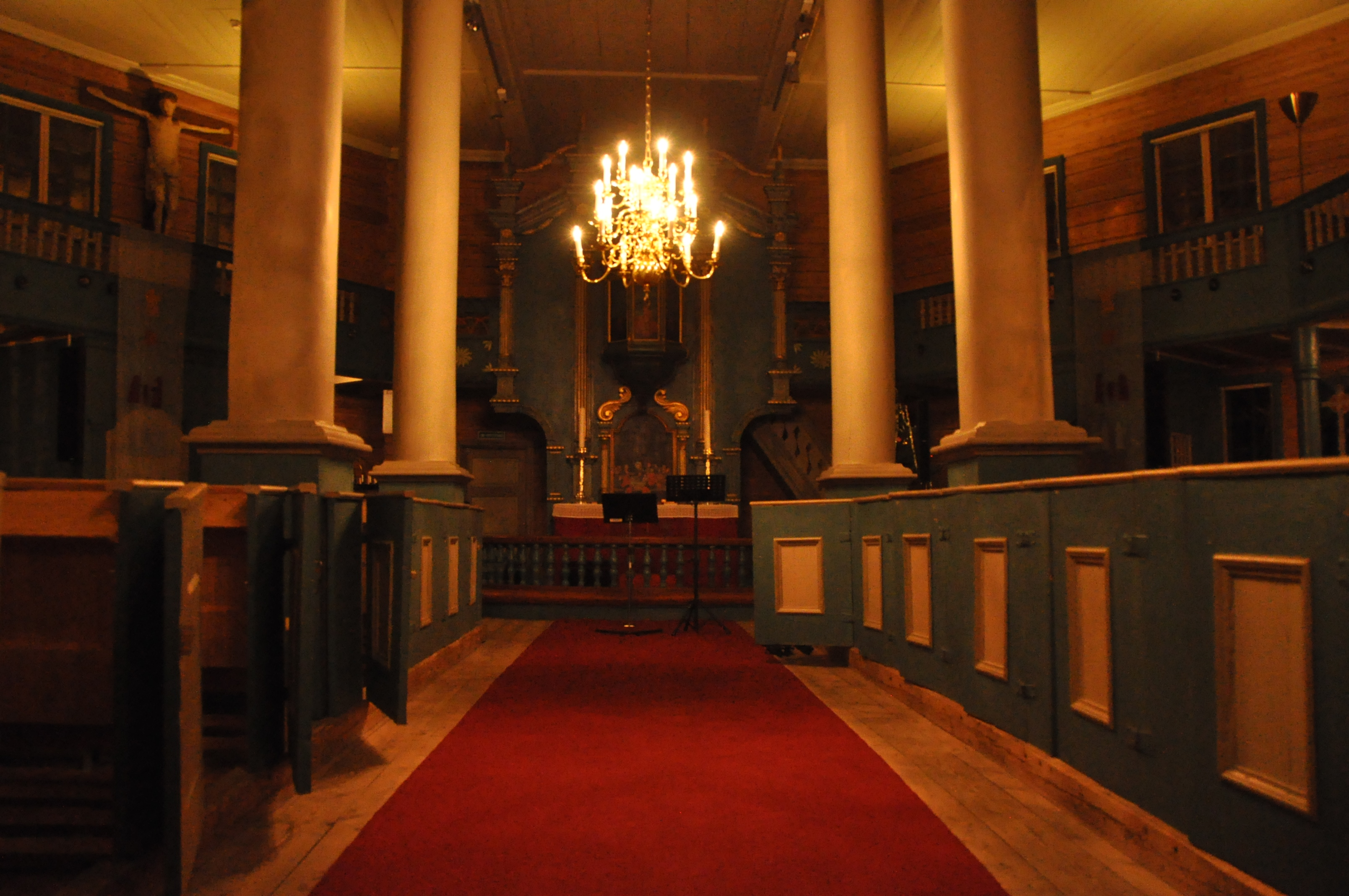

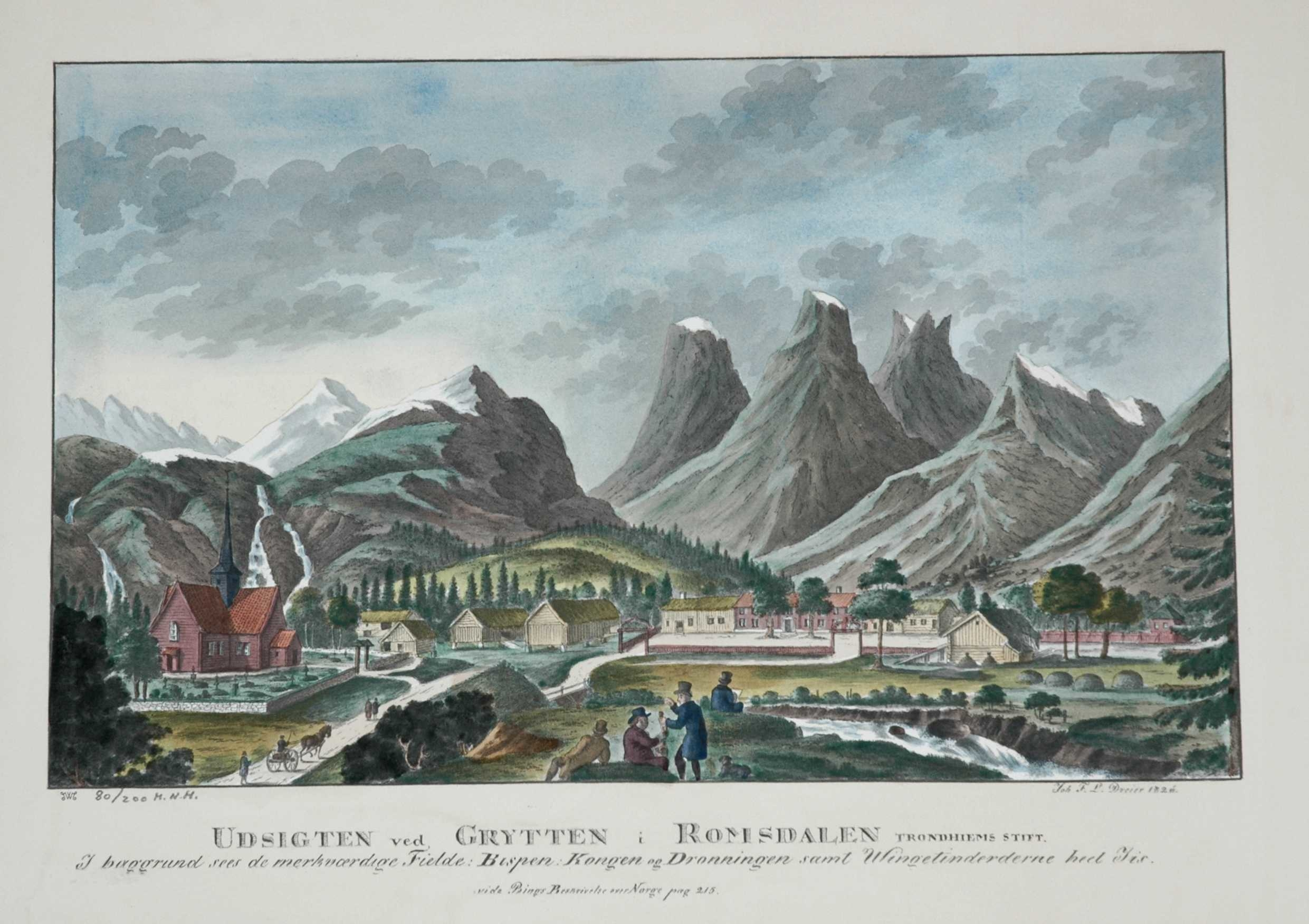
View of the old cruciform church (1732-1828)

== See also ==
- List of churches in Møre
