= Svend Aspaas =

Norwegian architect and builder

Svend Halvorsen Aspaas
- Born: 1736; Ålen, Norway
- Died: 1816 (aged 79–80); Røros, Norway
- Occupation: Architect
- Spouses: Ane Pedersdatter Ven, Maritte Rasmusdatter
- Children: Runar Aspaas
- Parent(s): Halvor Hansen Aspaas and Ingeborg Bersvendsdatter Gjersvoll

Svend Halvorsen Aspaas (1736–January 1816) was a Norwegian architect and builder who is known for several of the churches he built. He was also a master builder for the Røros Copper Works. He is credited as having invented and built a type of pumping station for mines. He was also known for building many bridges and dams.

Svend Aspaas was born on the Aspaas farm in the parish of Ålen (now part of Holtålen Municipality in Trøndelag county). He moved to the nearby mining town of Røros when he was young and he worked at the copperworks there. As a 17-year-old, he apprenticed as a blacksmith and later he was promoted and became a master at his trade. He was sent to Kongsberg in 1769 to receive further training in mining. In 1784, he went to the Falun Mine where he learned the use of slag stone as a building material.

== Church builder ==
Aspaas is best known as a church builder. He started out with a simple background and developed into a great architect who created several of the 18th century masterpieces in Norwegian church architecture. He received the credit for a number of large octagonal churches listed in the period 1780 to 1834, including several churches that were completed after his death. This view has lasted a long time in Norwegian architectural history. During the construction of Røros Church in 1779–1784, he joined in 1780 as leader of the masonry work, after the work had been started by mason Mohr from Trondheim. Svend Aspaas also worked together with Peder Ellingsen on woodwork and decoration of the church.

Aspaas led the construction of Sør-Fron Church in Gudbrandsdalen in the period from 1786 to 1792. The church was an octagonal stone church. His knowledge of masonry of high walls was necessary for the task and knowledge of constructions of bridges came in handy in the construction of the enormous roof structure. Vang Church near Hamar was built in 1806–1810. The church's architect was the parish's own parish priest Abraham Pihl. Pihl had to go away on a prolonged assignment for the king, with Aspaas taking over Pihl's task as executive builder in his absence.

The only church where Aspaas probably was both architect and builder is Stor-Elvdal Church. He provided drawings and models for the church in 1807 and led the work himself, which, however, was not completed until after Aspaas' death. The church is in its main form a greatly simplified version of Røros church, or rather with Tynset Church as a model, but with a central tower such as Sør-Fron Church. Some architectural misunderstandings reveal that it was not a skilled architect who shaped the church. The interior was also made with Tynset Church as a model, influenced by Røros Church's pulpit altars, but far simpler. Aspaas was probably not to be regarded as an innovative architect, his strength in church building lay in the technical skills as an executive builder.

His son Runar Aspaas designed, among other things, the octagonal Tolga Church.
