= Veblungsnes =

Village in Rauma Municipality, Norway

- Village
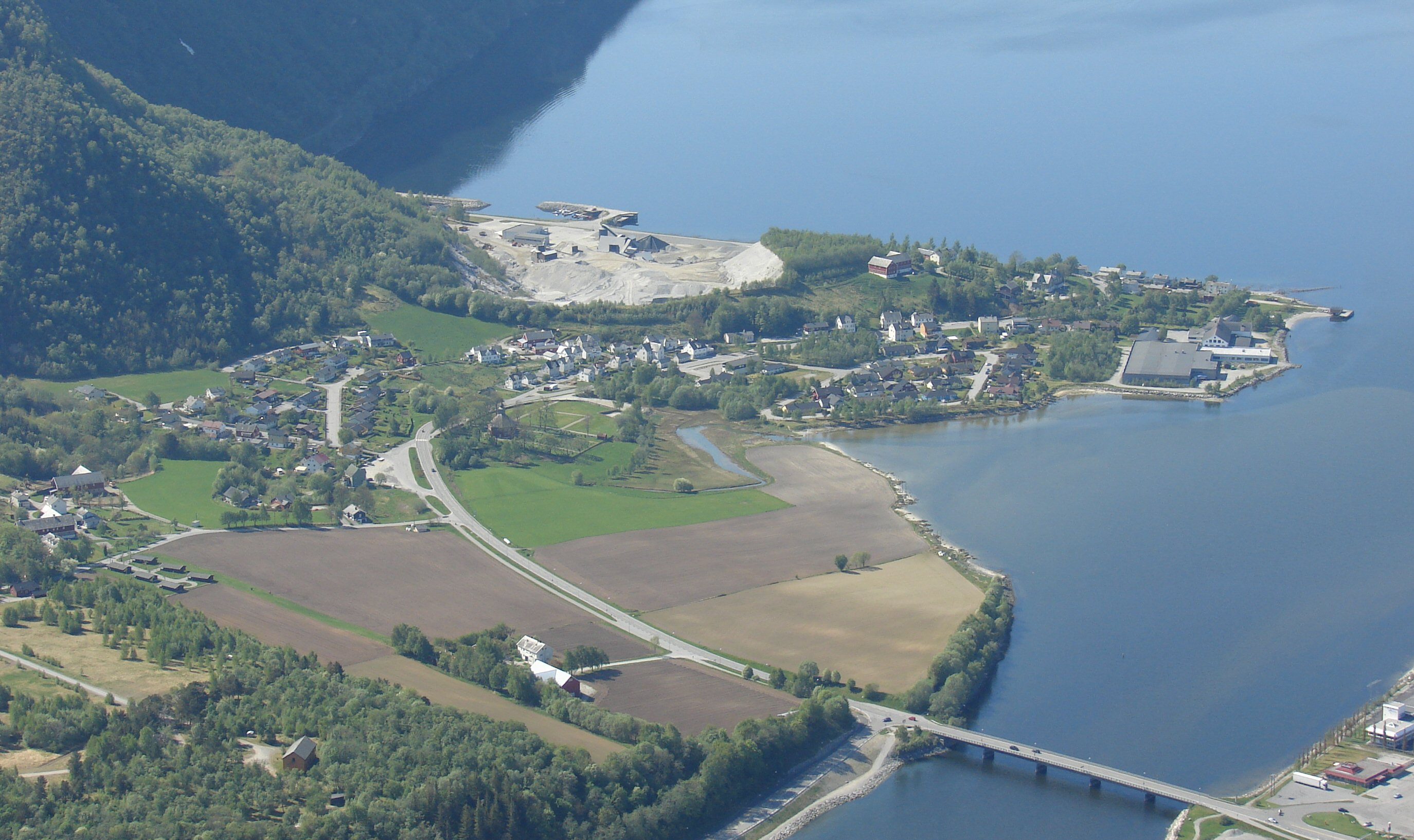
- View of Veblungsnes
- Interactive map of Veblungsnes
- Location within Møre og Romsdal Location within Norway
- Coordinates: 62.5532°N 7.6640°E
- Country: Norway
- Region: Western Norway
- County: Møre og Romsdal
- District: Romsdal
- Municipality: Rauma Municipality
- Elevation: 30 m (98 ft)
- Time zone: UTC+01:00 (CET)
  - Summer (DST): UTC+02:00 (CEST)
- Post Code: 6310 Veblungsnes

Veblungsnes is a village located in Rauma Municipality in Møre og Romsdal county, Norway. The village lies along Romsdal Fjord just across the mouth of the Rauma river from the town of Åndalsnes. The European route E136 highway runs through the village on its way from Åndalsnes southwest to the village of Innfjorden. Veblungsnes is home to the Grytten Church and the Setnesmoen military parade ground.
