= Røros Church =

Church in Trøndelag, Norway

- Røros kirke
- Bergstadens Ziir
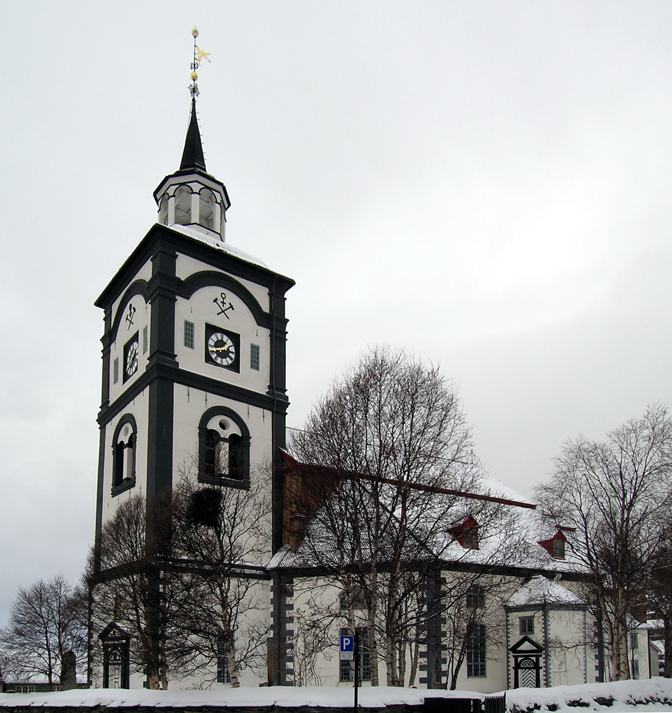
- View of the church
- Røros Church
- 62.577365378°N 11.3877958059°E
- Location: Røros Municipality, Trøndelag
- Country: Norway
- Denomination: Church of Norway
- Churchmanship: Evangelical Lutheran

History
- Status: Parish church
- Founded: 1651
- Consecrated: 15 August 1784

Architecture
- Functional status: Active
- Architect: Peter Leonard Neumann
- Architectural type: Octagonal
- Completed: 1784 (242 years ago)

Specifications
- Capacity: 1,640
- Materials: Stone

Administration
- Diocese: Nidaros bispedømme
- Deanery: Gauldal prosti
- Parish: Røros
- Norwegian Cultural Heritage Site
- Type: Church
- Status: Automatically protected
- ID: 85340

Røros Church or Bergstadens Ziir (Norwegian: Røros kirke) is a parish church of the Church of Norway in Røros Municipality in Trøndelag county, Norway. Located in the town of Røros, it is the main church for the Røros parish which is part of the Gauldal prosti (deanery) in the Diocese of Nidaros. The octagonal, whitewashed stone church was built in 1784 using plans drawn up by the architect Peter Leonard Neumann from Trondheim. The church seats about 1,600 people, making it the 5th largest church within the Church of Norway. It is also ranked by Riksantikvaren as one of the ten most high-profile churches in Norway. Since 1999, Røros Church is known as one of the concert venues of the Norwegian Advent Concert Series.

== History ==
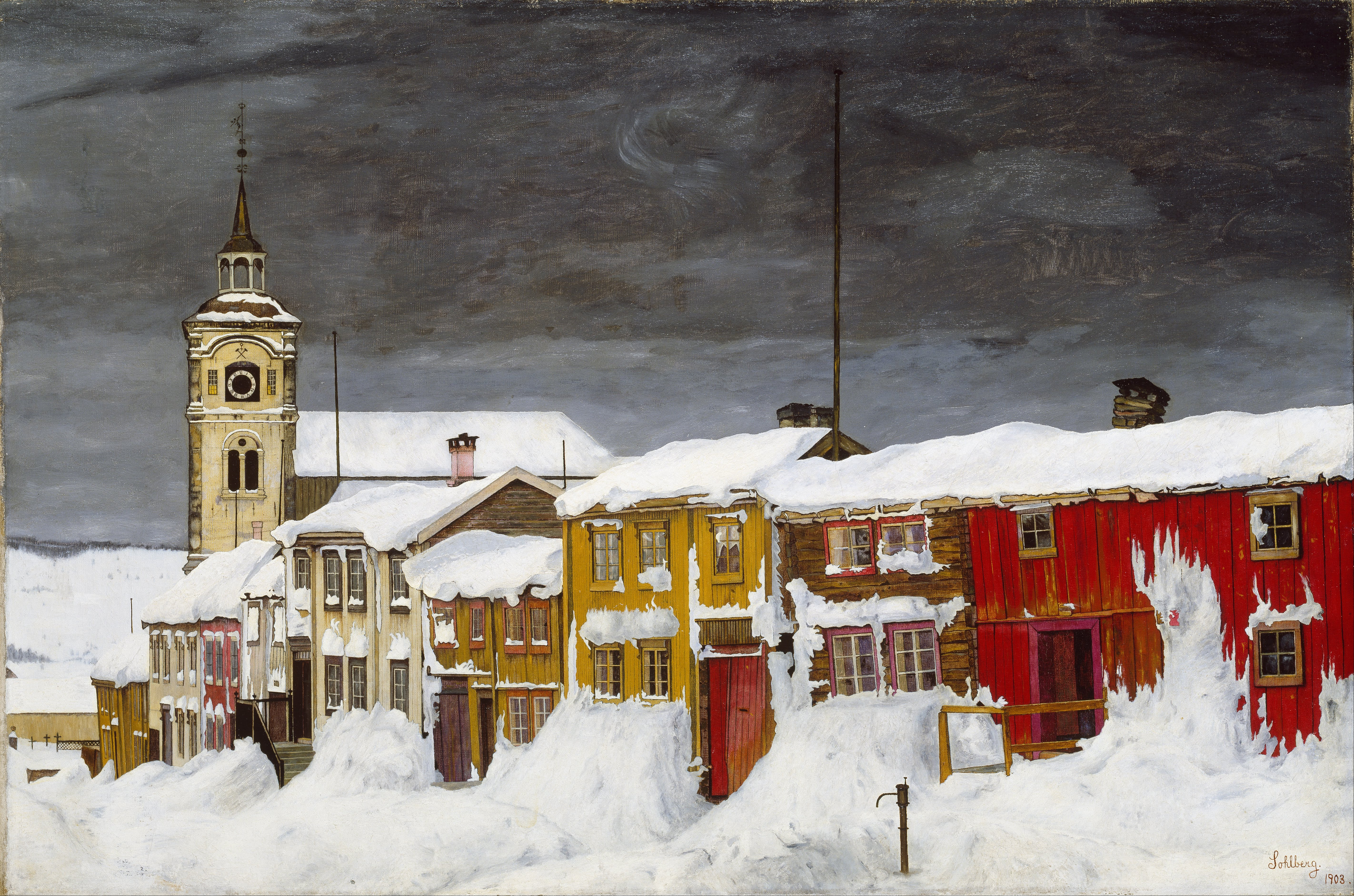
Street in Røros in Winter by Harald Sohlberg (Nasjonalmuseet, 1903)

The first church in Røros was built in 1651, not too long after the town was founded in 1644. The mining town is entirely based around the Røros Copper Works. Prior to the founding of the town, the area was part of the Ålen Church parish. The first church was a wooden long church. By the 18th century, the church was in poor condition and planning began for a new, larger church for the growing town.

In 1779, the old church was torn down and groundwork began for the new church. The plot of land was laid out by Peter Leonard Neumann from Trondheim, who also made the drawings for the building. The new church was located just beside where the old church was located. The stone construction material was slate from Gammelvollia or Sundlia in Troms. The church was consecrated on 15 August 1784 by Marcus Fredrik Bang, Bishop of the Diocese of Nidaros. Røros Copper Works paid for the building of the new stone church, and the emblem of the copperworks company was put on all sides of the tower wall. The total cost of the new church was 23,000 Riksdaler (if you added up the annual salaries for 425 local miners at that time, that would be equivalent to the cost of the church).

The pulpit and altar were designed by Peder Ellingsen (1725-1803), the lead builder at Røros Copper Works. He was responsible for the furnishing woodwork in the new church. The altarpiece features a painting from 1792 entitled Innstiftelsen av nattverden by artist Johan Jørgen Lyng (1756-1793).

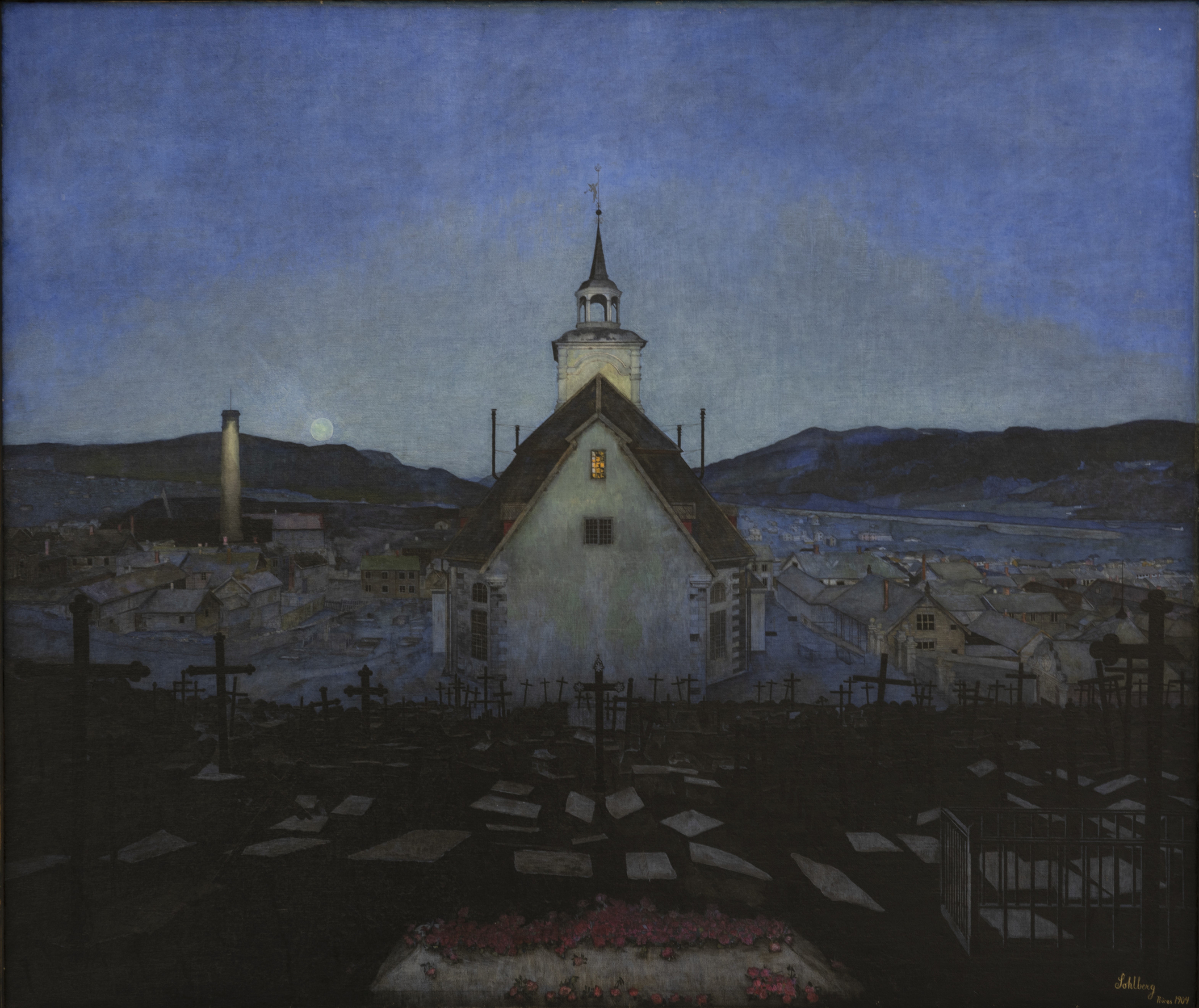
«Natt, Røros kirke» ("Night Røros Church") 1904.

In 1814, this church served as an election church (Norwegian: valgkirke). Together with more than 300 other parish churches across Norway, it was a polling station for elections to the 1814 Norwegian Constituent Assembly which wrote the Constitution of Norway. This was Norway's first national elections. Each church parish was a constituency that elected people called "electors" who later met together in each county to elect the representatives for the assembly that was to meet at Eidsvoll Manor later that year.

The architecture and prominent location of the church made it a major inspiration for the Norwegian artist Harald Sohlberg. He painted several works featuring the church, including his noted exploration of life, death and memory, «Natt, Røros kirke» ("Night (Røros Church").

The church underwent a major restoration from 1908–1917 at which time electricity was added. The baptismal font that is currently in the church is from 1913. In 1959, the original colors were restored in the building. There was another restoration from 2008–2010.

=== Name ===
The church is named "Røros kirke" which means "Røros Church", but the church is often locally referred to as "Bergstadens Ziir" which literally means "the mining town's beauty". This is because there is a sign over the entrance to the church that says "Til Guds Ære og Bergstadens Ziir" which means "to God's Glory and Bergstaden's beauty." Bergstaden refers to "the mining town" of Røros.

== Media gallery ==
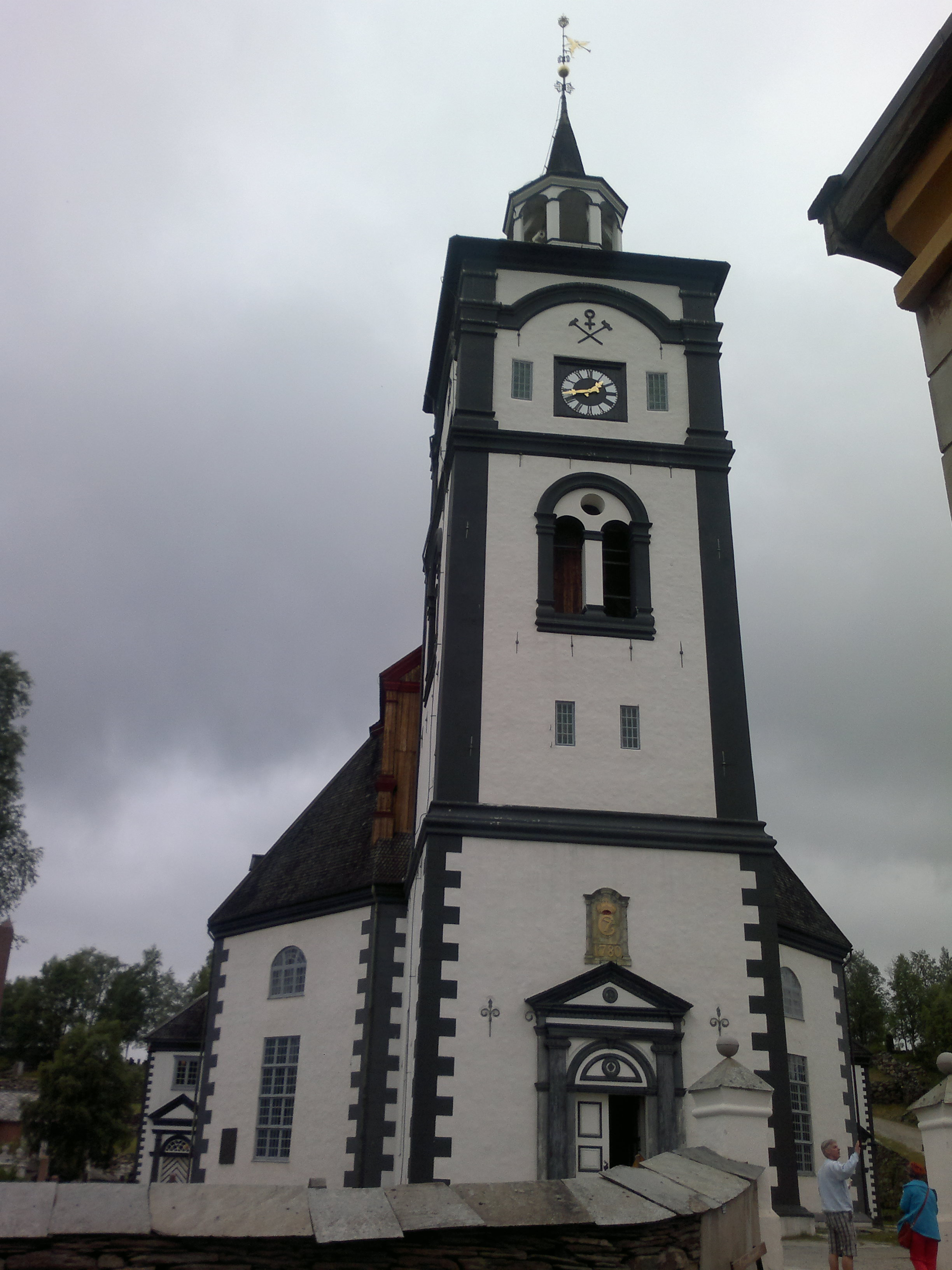
Exterior front

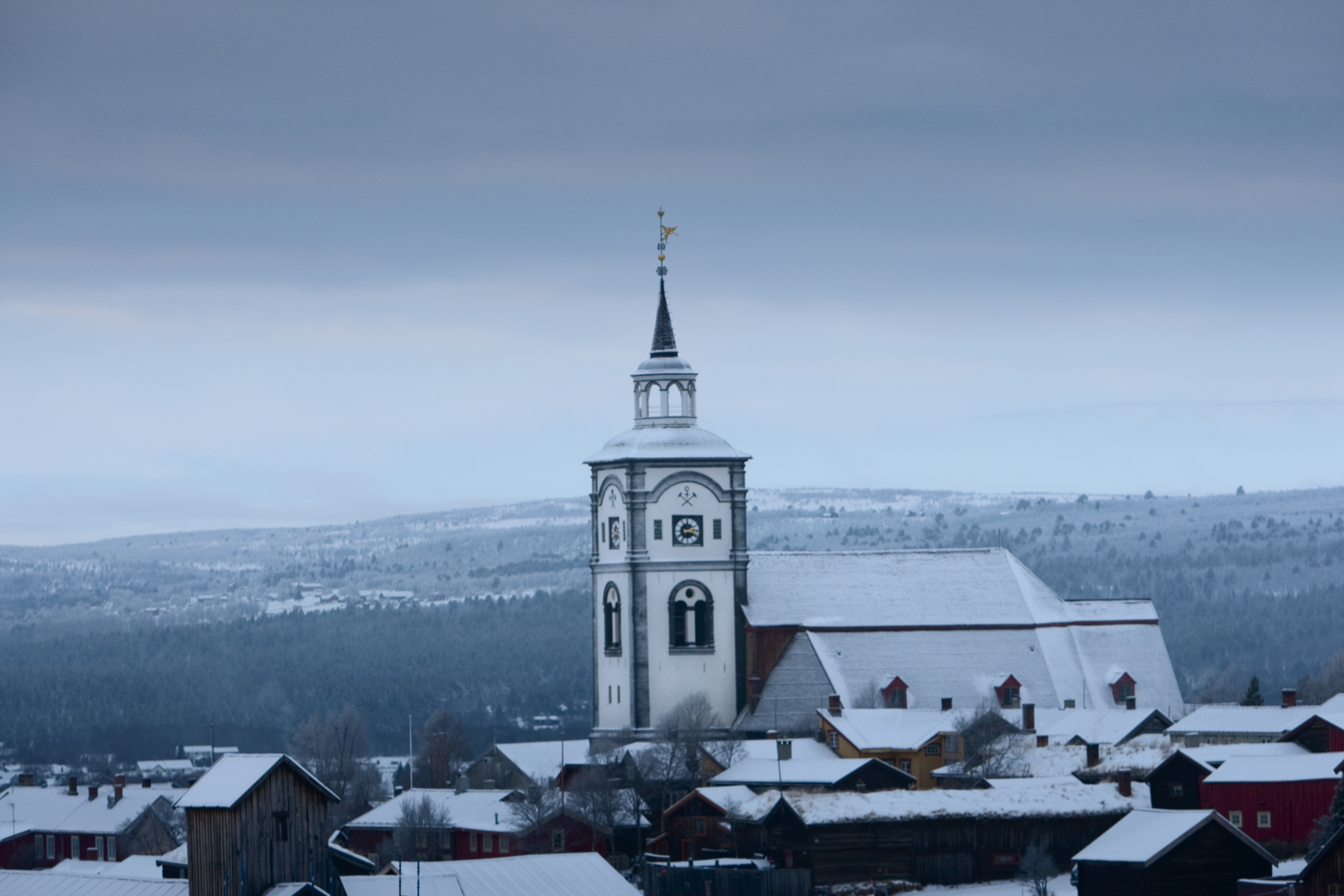
Tower view looking over the town

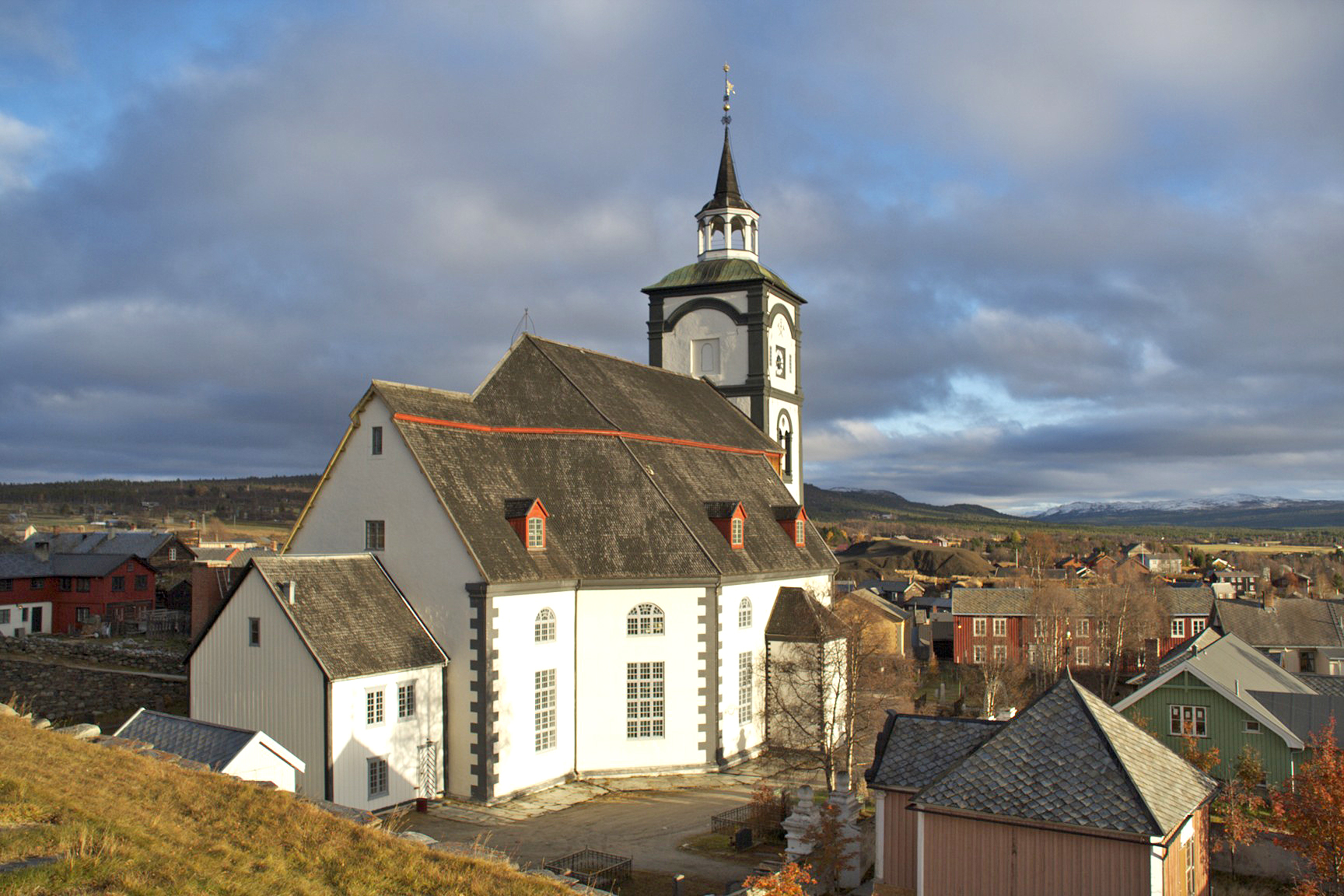
Side and back of the church

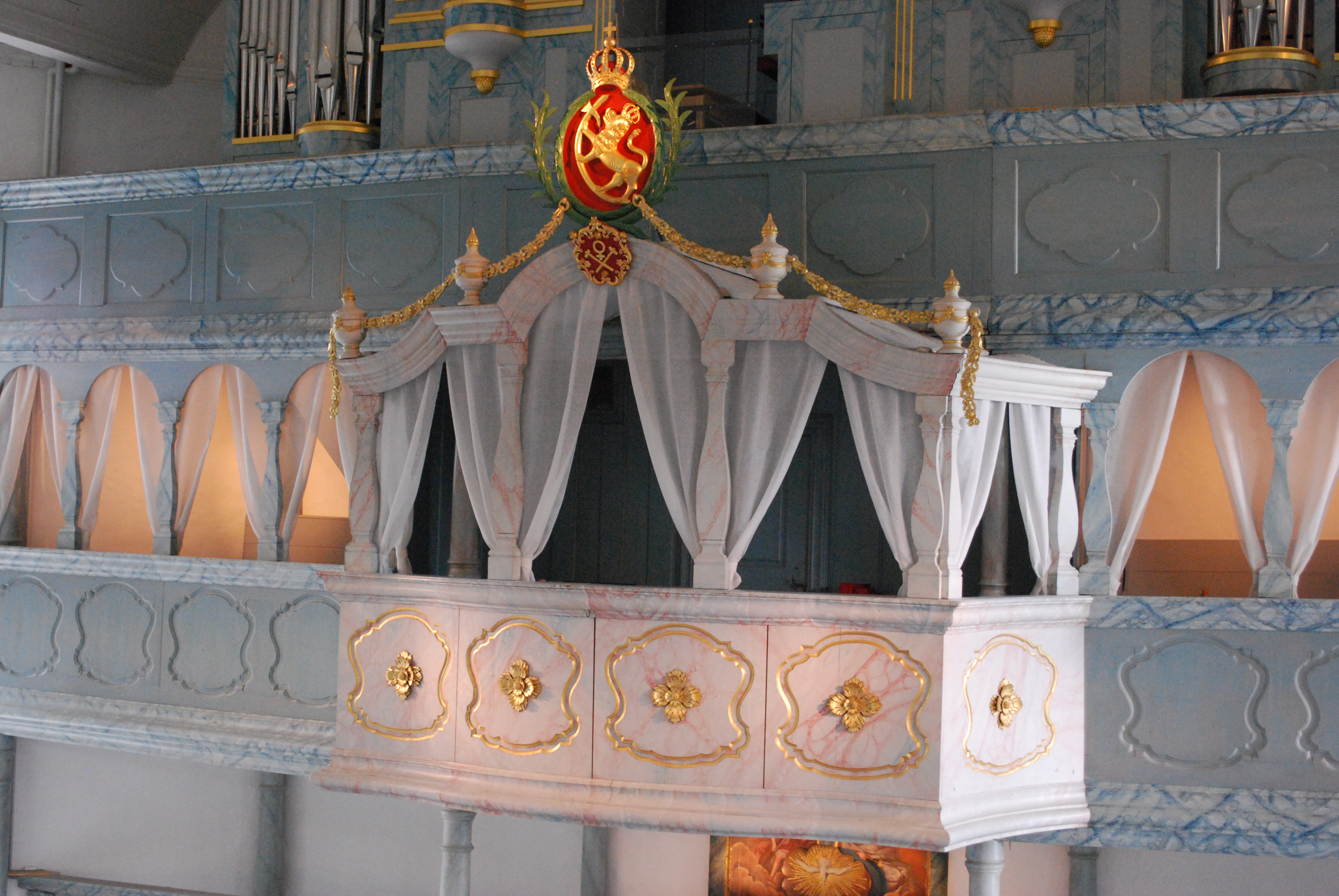
Royal box of Røros church

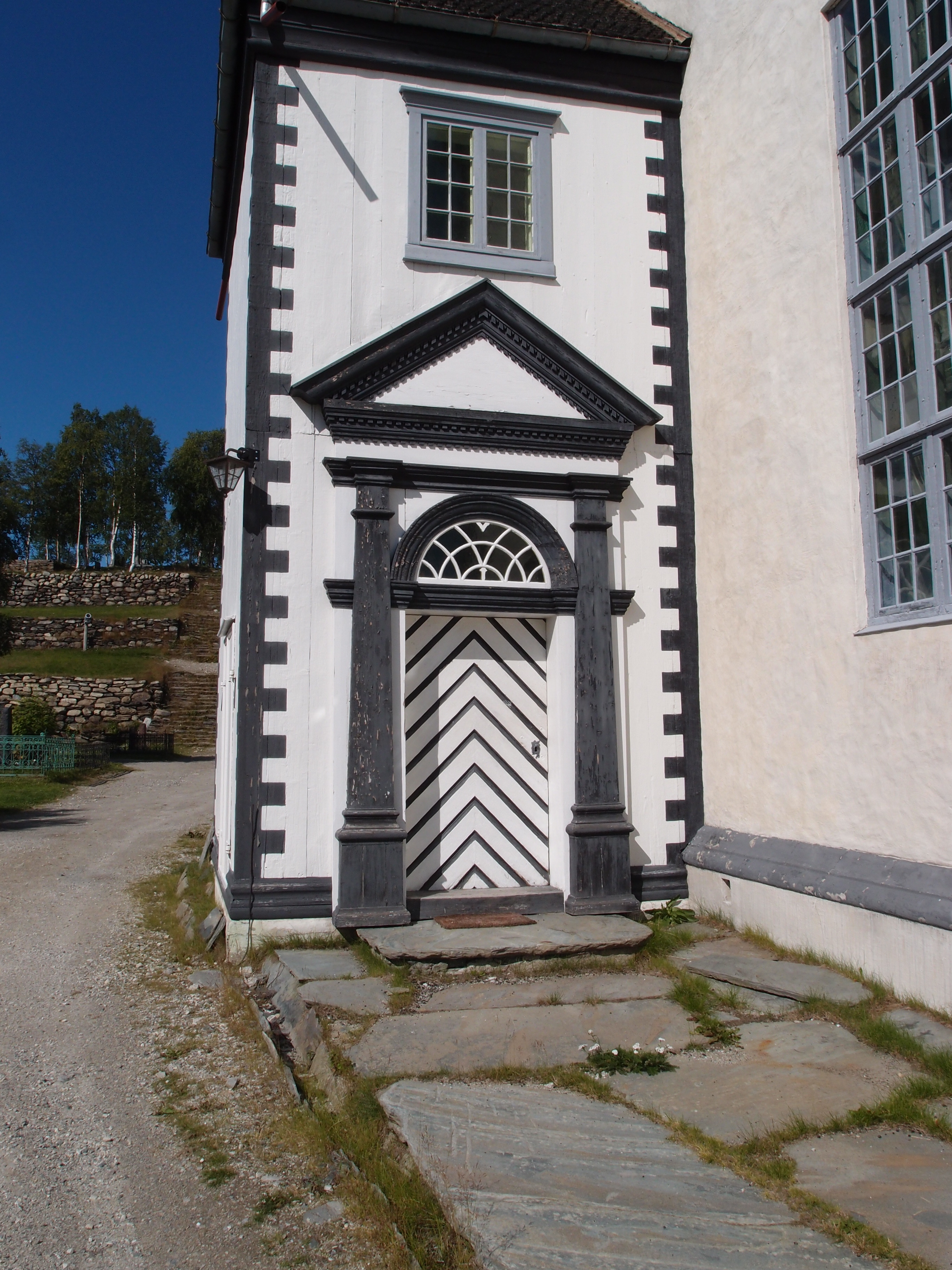
Exterior side entrance

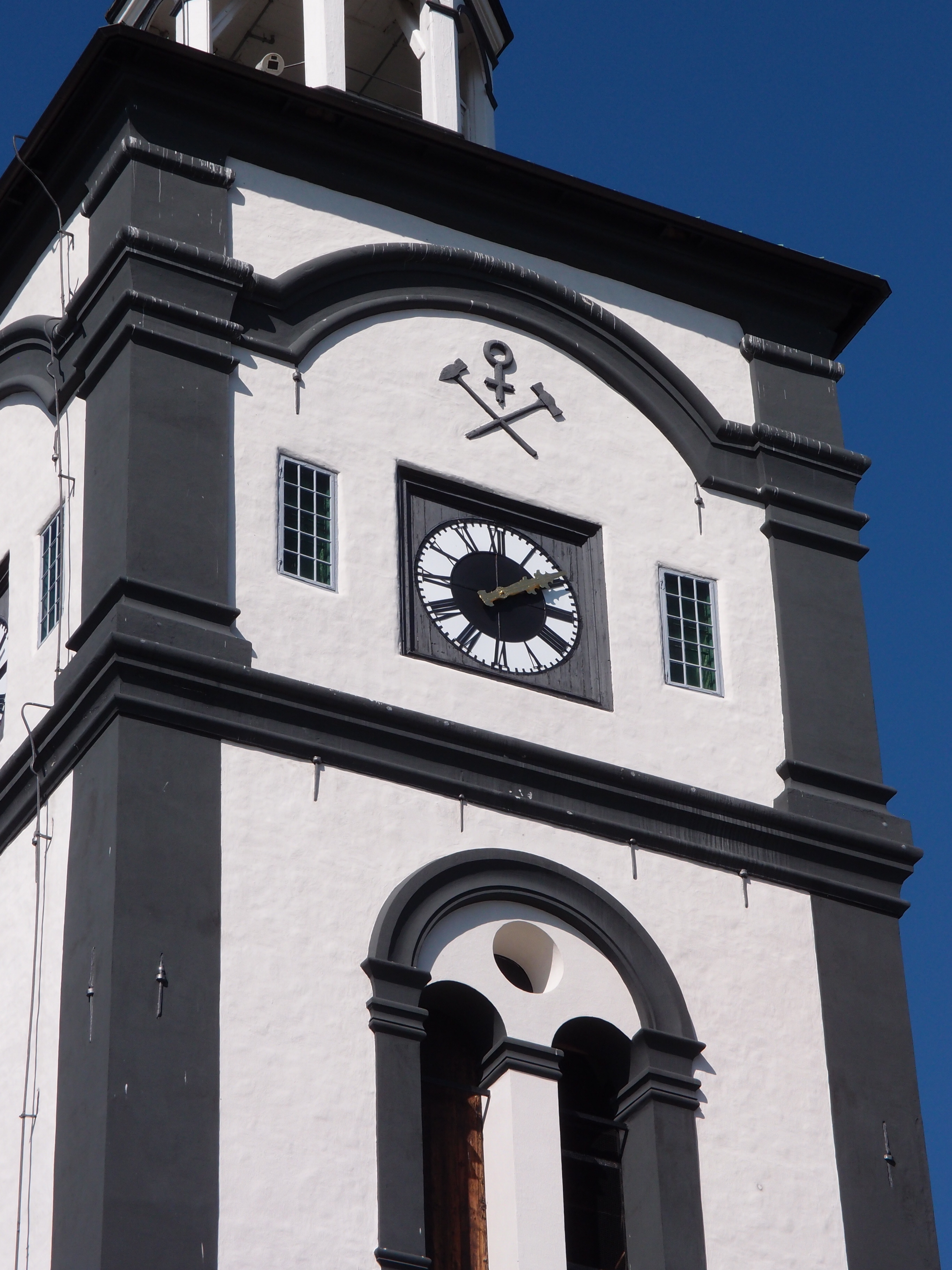
Exterior tower detail

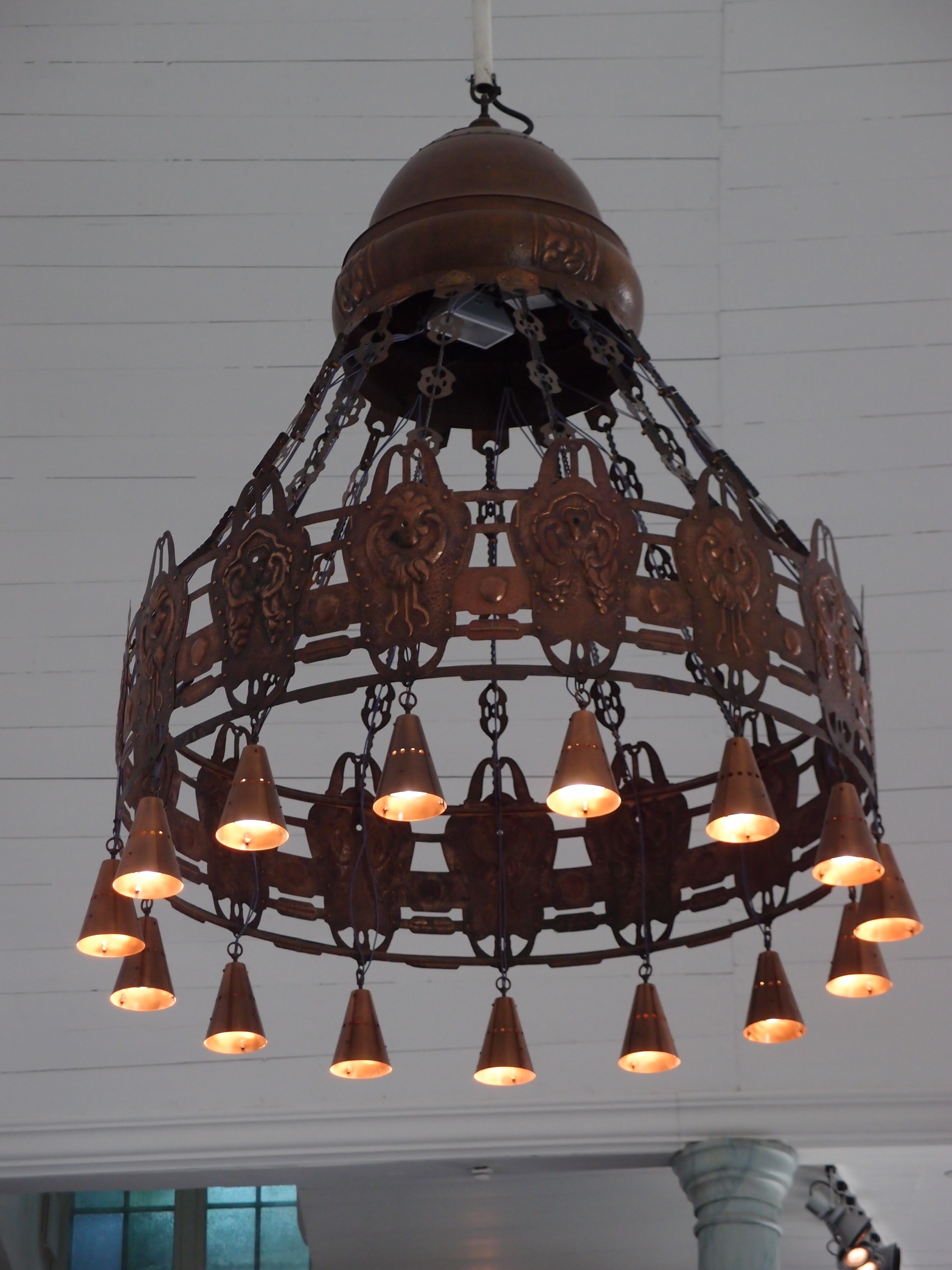
Interior chandelier

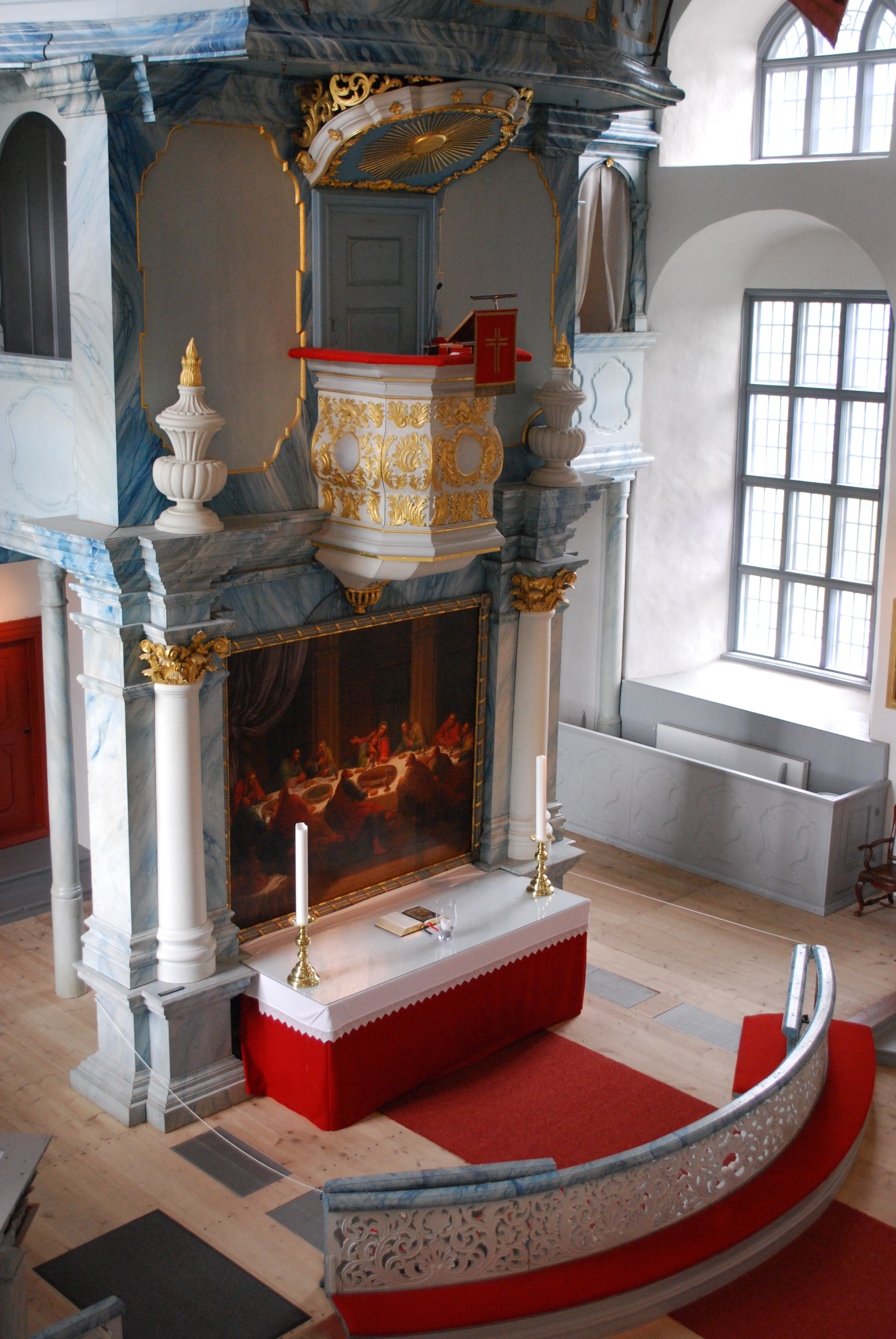
Altar and pulpit (1784)

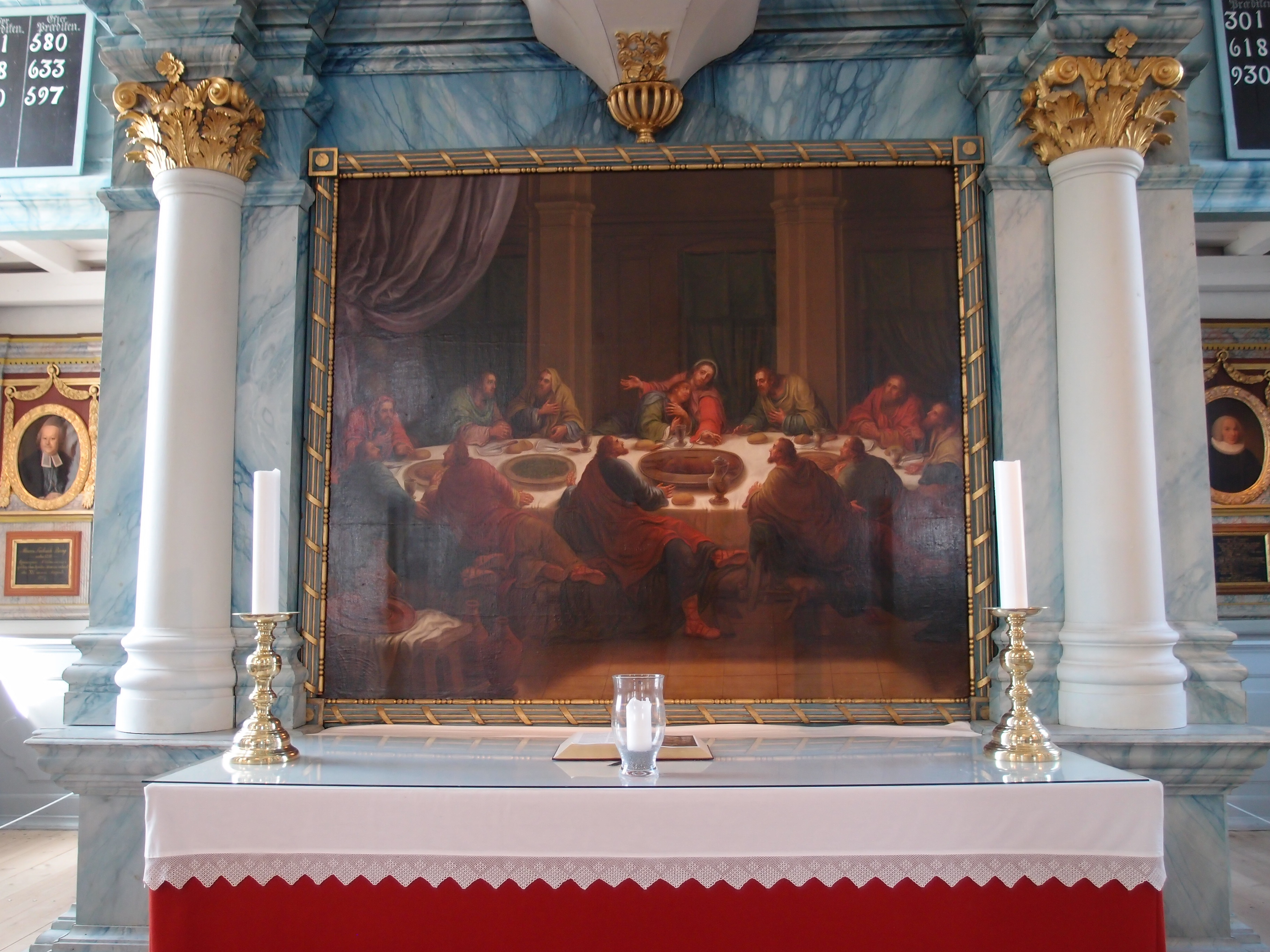
Altarpiece (1792)

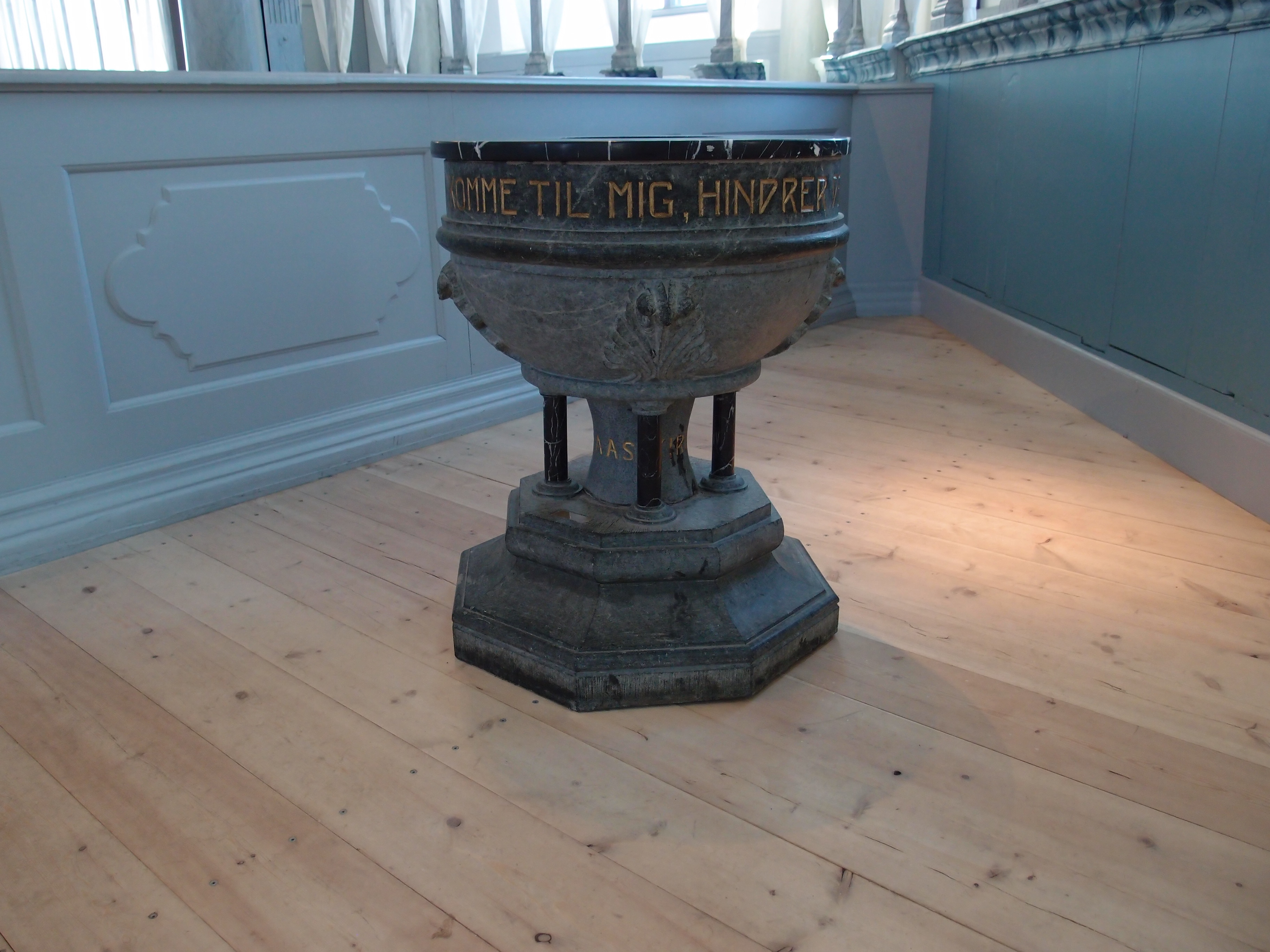
Baptismal font (1913)

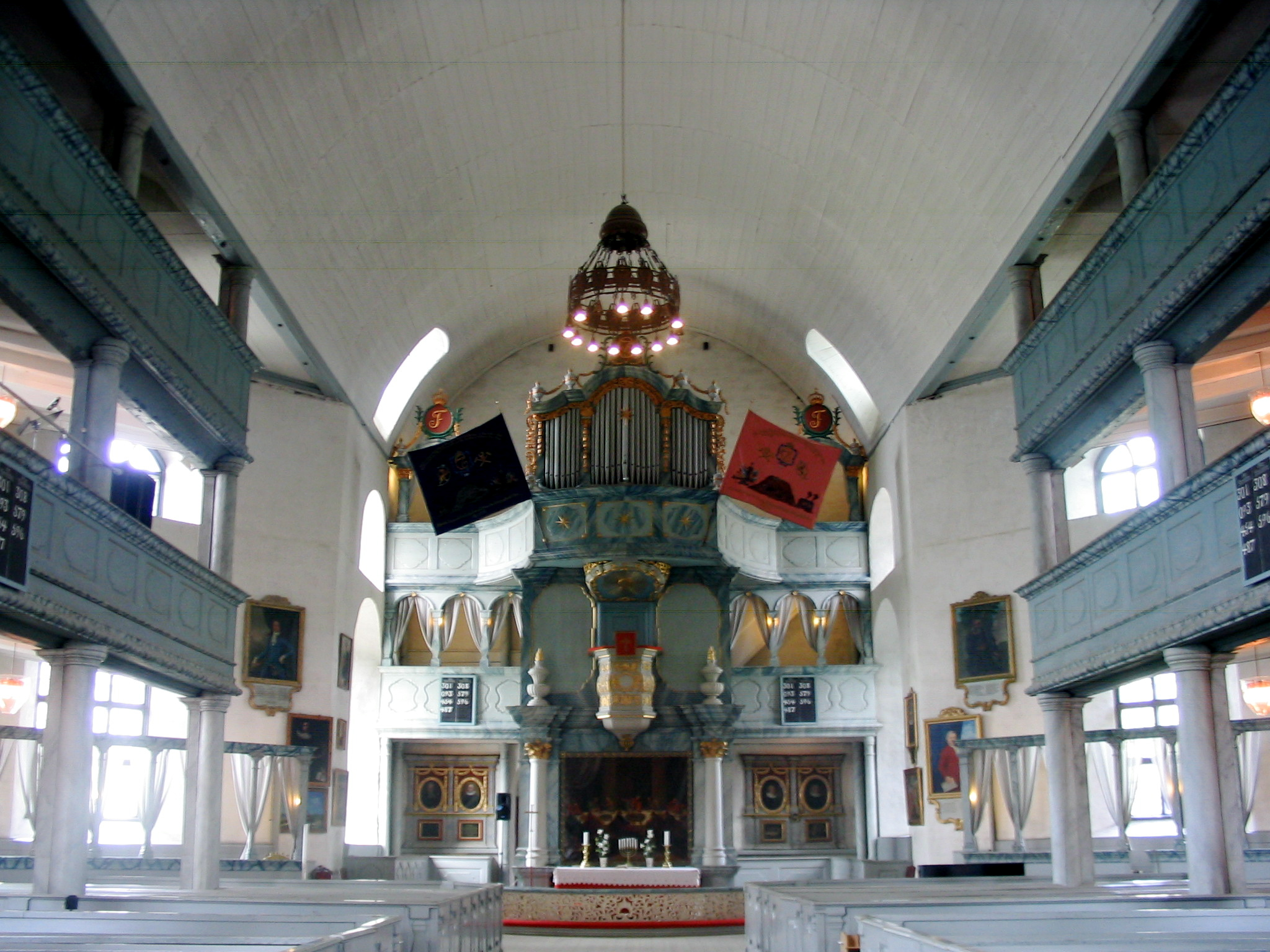
Interior view

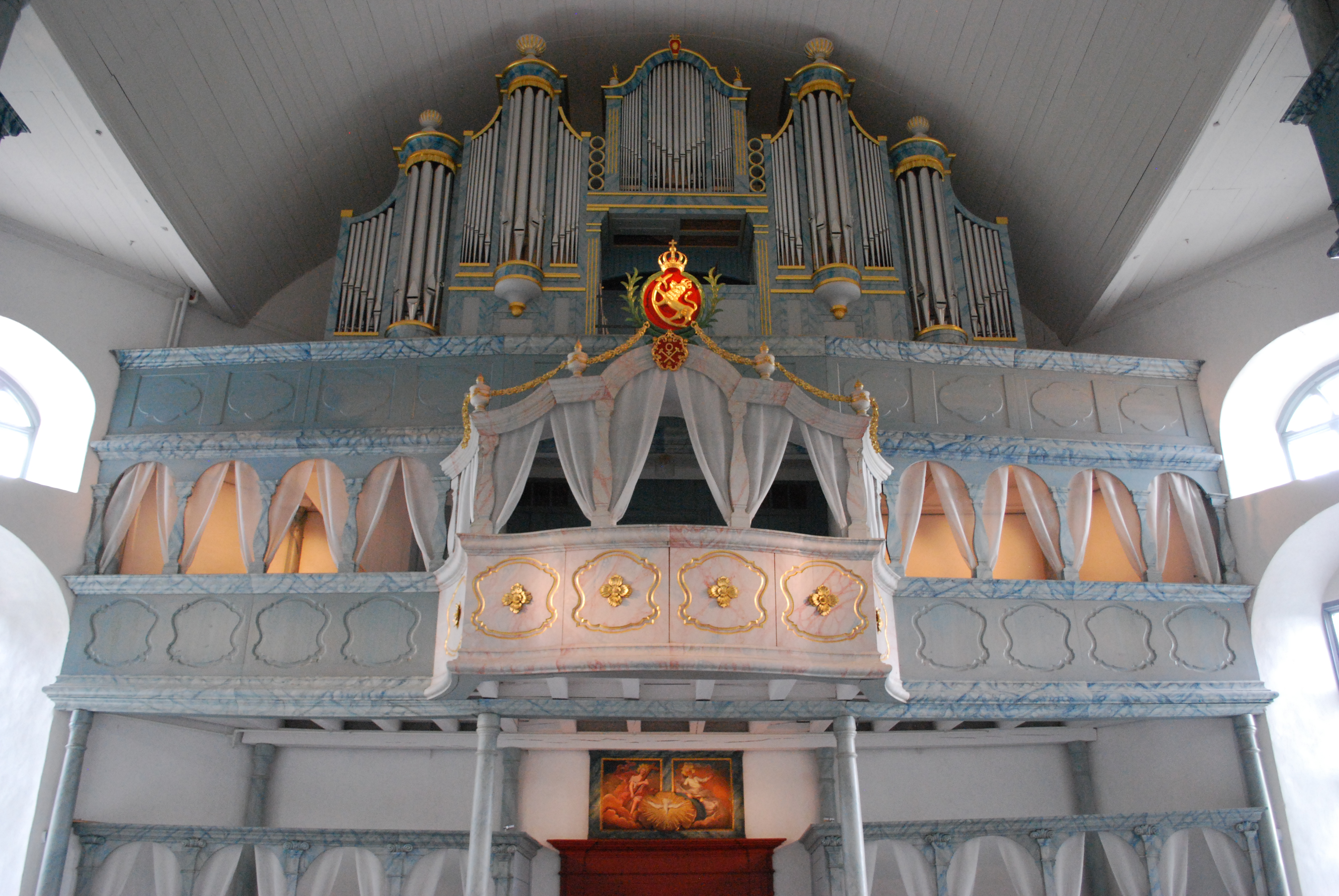
Ryde & Bergs Opus 99 Organ

== See also ==
- List of churches in Nidaros
